= List of Canadian films of 2026 =

This is a list of Canadian films released in 2026:

Title	Director	Cast	Notes	Ref
111 Echoes from Halifax	Mauro Mueller	Kris Holden-Ried, Natalie Brown, Ursina Lardi	Canadian-Swiss coproduction	
125, rue des Malaises	Louis Bélanger	Pier-Luc Funk, Rémy Girard, Claude Legault, Geneviève Schmidt, Guylaine Tremblay		
1000 Women in Horror	Donna Davies			
Accismus	Brandy Marien			
The Address Book	Mustafa Uzuner			
After Closing	François Lalonde			
After Image	Rita Ferrando			
After Love	Marjan Hashemi			
Agnes	Leah Vlemmiks			
Al Tuck My Blues Away	Brian Harrington			
All That She Wants	Scarlett Bermingham, Andrew Rhymer			
Almost Pink (Presque rose)	Justine Prince			
Ancestral Beasts	Tim Riedel	Morgan Holmstrom, Darla Contois, Gail Maurice, Asivak Koostachin, Jess Salgueiro		
Antidiva: The Carole Pope Confessions	Michelle Mama	Carole Pope		
Armageddon Road	Karen Lam	Natalie Grace, Willie Aames, Brian McCaig, April Telek, and Landon Liboiron		
Au nord des hommes	Marc G. Carbonneau			
L'Autre	Alexandre Franchi	Pierre-Yves Cardinal, Bilel Chegrani, Karine Gonthier-Hyndman, Nahéma Ricci		
Ba's Book	Ashley Duong			
Baby Daddy	Joel Mackenzie			
Back in Black	Ron Murphy	Christopher Walken, Ella Ballentine, Jane Curtin		
Bagman	Connor Gaston, Vaughn Gaston			
The Ballad of Judas Priest	Tom Morello, Sam Dunn			
The Banquet	Gloria Ui Young Kim			
Beans and Belief	Tenzin Sedon			
Being Still	Joe Bender, Scott Munn			
The Betrayers	David Bezmozgis	Michael Aronov, Simon McBurney, Tina Benko		
Between Late April and Early May	Sophia Smith			
Between Us (Entre nous)	Félix Bouffard-Dumas			
BID16	Mick Robertson, Margaret Rose			
Billy Gauthier: Carving the Future	Jennie Williams			
The Black Box Is Orange	Yuula Benivolski			
Black Water (Lac en cœur)	Tim Bouvette			
Black Zombie	Maya Annik Bedward			
Blessing	Birute Sodeikaite			
The Blind Couple from Mali	Ryan Marley	Amadou & Mariam		
The Bookstore That Never Sleeps	Justin Zoras			
A Breath of Fresh Air	Alexandre Pelletier			
Breeder	Alex Goyette	Daniel Doheny, Dot Marie Jones, Maddie Phillips, Tanaya Beatty		
The Bryce Lee Story	Arnold Lim	Rickie Wang, Cordelia Chao, Benny Wang		
Buddies	Fraser Wolfe			
Burnt Toast	Brielle Leblanc			
BYEEEE	Chell Stephen	Romina D'Ugo, Augustus Rivers, Katie Boland, Maddy Foley		
Cabbage Daddy	Grace An			
Call Me Tim	Shamier Anderson			
A Cape Breton Storyteller	Geoff D'Eon			
Captain Newfoundland	Jamie Miller, Mike Feehan			
Ceremony	Banchi Hanuse			
CFNY: The Spirit of Radio	Matt Schichter			
Citizen Vigilante	Uwe Boll	Armie Hammer, Costas Mandylor		
Closing Night	Cody Fern	Sarah Paulson, Naomi Watts, Dianne Wiest		
Clubfoot	Nathan Donovan	Ryley-Ray Levasseur, Adam Levasseur, Daelyn James		
Code of Misconduct	Sébastien Trahan	Rick Westhead		
Collectors	Andrew Cividino	Sarah Gadon, Noah Reid, Don McKellar		
The Comet	Julie Charette			
Concrete Turned to Sand	Ryan Ermacora, Jessica Johnson			
Crash Land	Dempsey Bryk	Finn Wolfhard, Billy Bryk, Noah Nemo Parker		
Darlene Love: I Know Where I've Been	Barry Avrich			
Death Has No Master (La muerte no tiene dueño)	Jorge Thielen Armand			
Death of a Yellow Bird	Cody Calahan			
The Delivery Line: Midwives on the Frontlines	Nance Ackerman			
Don't Forget the Oatmeal (Oublie pas le gruau)	Olivier Godin	Jean-Marc Dalpé, Kayo Yasuhara, Eric Jacobus, Dennis Ruel		
Dough Man	Brittney Gavin, Amy Mielke			
Driftwood	A.C. Birch			
Empty Heaven	Abdolreza Kahani			
Endless Sunlight	Tyson Houseman			
The Episode	Logan Graham Greene			
Eskipesimk	Catherine C. Brown, Jeffrey R. Fish			
Everything Else Is Noise (Lo demás es ruido)	Nicolás Pereda			
Extravagant Ways to Say Goodbye	Liese Kuhn			
The Fading of Morning Light	Jessamine Yú Fok			
Faking Filmation	Rob McCallum			
Fight Kid	Michael Del Monte			
The Final Act (Le Dernier acte)	Sophie Deraspe			
A Fire There (Un feu au loin)	Marlene Edoyan			
First Comes Love: Nakabingwit	Joella Cabalu			
Fivehead	Christian Smith			
The Flames of Me (Je m'appelle Daniel)	Daniel Léger			
Flapjax	Rocko Zevenbergen			
The Flight	Soran Mardookhi			
Footsteps on the Ceiling	Giran Findlay Liu			
Foreign Tongue	Boris Mojsovski	Kimberly-Sue Murray, Steve Byers, Cynthia Ashperger, Jasmin Geljo		
François.e	Jean-François Asselin	Louis Morissette, Pascale Drevillon, Geneviève Schmidt, Robin Aubert, Rachel Graton, Denis Marchand, Irdens Exantus		
Freaks Part II	Adam Stein, Zach Lipovsky			
Gail	Michael Maxxis			
Gal Pals	Margaret Donahoe			
Gasmask	Harry Cepka			
Gimme Truth	Simon Ennis, Brad Abrahams			
Going Nowhere Fast	Dylan Paffe			
Gold Blooded	Matt Campagna, Andre Rehal	Ari Millen		
Guard	Tim Mombourquette			
The Gymnasts of Fisherman Colony	Habiba Nosheen			
Half a Decade of Projecting	Jana Rankov			
Haunted (Hantée)	Rafaël Ouellet	Jade Brind'Amour, Virginie Fortin, Évelyne Brochu, François Létourneau, Emma Bao Linh, Claude Legault, Katherine Levac		
The Highway	Yung Chang			
Hive	Felipe Vargas	Xochitl Gomez, Aaron Dominguez, Zenobia Kloppers, Victoria Firsova, Tanya van Graan, Jenny le Roux, Thulani Nzonzo		
Holo	Alexander De Souza			
Holy Days	Nathalie Boltt	Judy Davis, Jacki Weaver, Miriam Margolyes	Canada-New Zealand co-production	
Home Bodies	Casey Walker	Ian Ho, Emma Ho, Ess Hödlmoser		
Homeless to Home	Andrea Dorfman			
Homicide involontaire	Noël Mitrani	Elliott Mitrani, Mélanie Elliott, Laurent Lucas, Noémie Godin Vigneau, Guillaume Rodrigue, Leilia Gagné, Richard Jutras, Camile Foley		
Hooked	Catherine Bussiere			
The Hourglass (Le Sablier)	Kim Nguyen			
A House	Kevin Saychareun			
How Brief	Kelly McCormack			
How We Stand	Marie Clements	Amber Midthunder, Cara Jade Myers, Alyssa Wapanatâhk		
Hyena	Matthew Ninaber	Storm Steenson, Kristen Kaster, Jeremy Ninaber, Matthew Ninaber		
Hypernormalized	Justin McConnell	Michelle D'Alessandro Hatt, Adam Buller, Adrian Patterson, Robert LaSardo, Caryn Richman, Duane Whitaker, Matt Farley, Hiroshi Watanabe, Victor Miró		
I Come Home	Glen Wood	Hannah Cheesman, Carlos Gonzalez-Vio, Ryan Ali, Jordan Hayes		
Imelda Strikes Back (Imelda contre-attaque)	Martin Villeneuve			
Imichki	Yza Nouiga			
In Alaska	Jaap van Heusden, Vinnie Karetak	Leo Matthew Temela, Noomi Rapace		
In the Heart of the South	Nyla Innuksuk	Anna Lambe, Zorga Qaunaq, Alexander Nunez, Martha Burns		
In the Morning Sun	Serville Poblete			
In Tyee Country	Jevan Crittenden, Nate Slaco			
An Incomplete Calendar	Sanaz Sohrabi			
L'Inconvénient	Julien G. Marcotte			
Indivisum: Legacies Adrift	Katia Café-Fébrissy			
Insectasy	Angus Silver	Tirion Healy		
Invisible Harvests	Stephanie Dudley			
Ithaqua	Casey Walker	Luke Hemsworth, Kevin Durand, Michael Pitt, Craig Lauzon, Leenah Robinson		
Jabber	Aubert Sénéchal			
Jeffrey's Turn	Glen Gould	Zeegwun Shilling, Glen Gould, Grace Dove, Brandon Oakes		
Jersey Boy	Jaskaran Singh	Praneet Akilla		
Julián	Louise Bagnall			
Kairos	Jennifer Alleyn	Philippe-Audrey Larrue-Saint-Jacques, Théodore Pellerin, Emmanuel Schwartz		
King Kong vs. Pinocchio	Janet Perlman			
Koden'n	Daniel «Tètèl» Chérubin			
Kylgor in the Grisly Abyss	Mason Jeffrey Newton-DeRushie			
Labrador: Autopsy of Silence	Rodrigue Jean	Christopher Angatookalook, Alexandre Landry, Gabrielle Poulin B., Jassinth Thiagarajah		
Ladies and Gentlemen, Brian Mulroney (Mesdames et Messieurs, Brian Mulroney)	Matthew Rankin			
The Last Days of April	Ree Wright, Meaghan Wright	April Hubbard		
Last Moon	Brandon D. Cox	Shawn Doyle, Colin Cunningham		
The Last Whale Singer	Reza Memari			
Letters from Tibet	Kunsang Kyirong			
Lifeline	Ilhan Abdullahi	Muna Abdullahi, Hanad Abdi		
The Lion Does Not Concern Himself	Zarrar Kahn			
A Lonely Night	Camille Beaubi			
A Long Winter	Andrew Haigh			
Look at Me	Nikita Morris			
Lucky Weekend	Kevin Alves	Kevin Alves, Jesse Camacho		
Lunar Sway	Nick Butler	Noah Parker, Douglas Smith, Liza Weil		
Lydia and the Mist Rider (Lydia et le vaisseau des tempêtes)	Émilie Rosas, Philippe Arseneau Bussières, Nancy Florence Savard	Sophie Nélisse, Mizinga Mwinga, Sarah Booth, Anthony Kavanagh, Anna Hopkins, Kathleen Fee, Mark Camacho, Arthur Holden, Guy Nadon, Gildor Roy, Dorothée Berryman		
The Mad World of Harvey Kurtzman	Bart Simpson			
Mainprize	Jack Hilkewicz	Derek Blayone		
Man Eating Pussy	Emily Lawson			
Man in Motion: The Rick Hansen Story	Adrian Buitenhuis	Rick Hansen		
Manhunt	Wayne Wapeemukwa			
Margot	Marthe Bernard			
Materia	Alisi Telengut			
Mary Magdalene (Marie Madeleine)	Gessica Généus		Multinational coproduction	
Mihnea	Mike Doaga			
Motherbaby Runs a Race	Rebecca E. Tremblay			
My Father's Soul (Roméo et son corps)	Fred Gervais-Dupuis			
The Myth of a Real Man	Lee Filipovski	Milica Gojković, Filip Đurić, Bogdan Diklić, Vesna Trivalić, Cynthia Ashperger		
Neil Peart: No One's Disciple	Sam Dunn, Scot McFadyen			
Nekai Walks	Rico King	Nekai Foster, Devon Jones		
Neverman	Rodrigo Barriuso	Justin Vivian Bond, Marie-Josée Croze, Zaiba Baig, Elias Koteas		
Nightmare's Advice (Cauchemar Conseil)	Renaud Després-Larose, Ana Tapia Rousiouk			
Nina Roza	Geneviève Dulude-De Celles	Galin Stoev, Chiara Caselli, Michelle Tzontchev, Mart Lachev		
Nirilaurta: Let Us Eat	Malaya Qaunirq Chapman			
Nitassinan	Joséphine Bacon, Kim O'Bomsawin			
Nobody Sees Me Like You Do	Keith Hodder	Joelle Farrow, Eric Osbourne, Robert Bazzocchi, Neeky Dalir		
Nobody's Violence (Violence du corps de l'autre)	Denis Côté	Larissa Corriveau, Pierrette Robitaille, Philippe Rebbot, Louise Deschâtelets, Eve Pressault		
Northbound	William Scoular	Bruce Dern, Dylan Baker, Graham Greene, Hunter Parrish, Joanna Cassidy, Julia Fox		
Nuisance Bear	Gabriela Osio Vanden, Jack Weisman		Feature expansion of the 2021 short film Nuisance Bear	
The Outer Threat	William Woods	Constance Wu, William Fichtner, Mark O'Brien		
Pacific Spirit	Antoine Bourges			
Paradise	Jérémy Comte			
The Parking Spot (La Place)	Louis Godbout	Maxim Gaudette, Christine Beaulieu, Alexa-Jeanne Dubé, Maxime Genois, Benoît Gouin		
Pauline (Pauline Julien: femme pays)	Anaïs Barbeau-Lavalette	Suzanne Clément, Alexa-Jeanne Dubé, Steve Gagnon, Kathleen Fortin, Violette Chauveau, Véronique Côté		
Paying Respects	Jessica Wu			
Peacocks Come with the Clouds	Parastoo Anoushahpour			
Permanent Damage	Seth A. Smith	Calem MacDonald, Stephen Dorff, Olivia Scriven, Clare Coulter, Stephen McHattie		
Phreaker	Adam Yorke			
The Pichenotte (La Pichenotte)	Antoine Boulanger	Hugo Giroux, Carmen Sylvestre, Michel Courtemanche		
Piluk	Marc Séguin, Elisapie Isaac			
Pique-Nique	Jérémy Gagnon			
Plan C	Scott Cavalheiro	Claire Cavalheiro, Scott Cavalheiro, Kris Holden-Ried		
Platypus	Joshua Gratton			
Please Fix Me	Colby Conrad			
Pocket Mirror	Adrian Murray			
Primary	Conor Madill	Spiro Dellas, Monica Bagaric, Anthony Sproviero, Scott Bellis, Zack Fonzofs, Matteo Pellizzari		
Purgatory	Lindsay Lanzillotta	Ruby McGurrin, Abby Elliott, Lauren MacRae, John Reynolds, J. K. Simmons, Mary Walsh		
Queens for a Day	Chris Carter			
Redemptions (Rédemptions)	Luc Picard	Kelly Depeault, Sophie Desmarais, Jean-Simon Leduc, Maxim Gaudette, Charles-Aubey Houde, Gérard Lanvin, Henri Picard		
Relax, Open Your Eyes	David Ehrenreich			
Remnant	Ken Kabatoff	Talisa Mae Stewart, Kim Coates, Nathalie Boltt, Megan Peta Hill		
Revel	Mishki Vaccaro			
Los Rios	Ryan Fyfe-Brown, Dale Bailey			
Rock Springs	Vera Miao	Kelly Marie Tran, Benedict Wong, Jimmy O. Yang		
Romin	Anthony Dionne, Jassen Charron	Anthony Dionne, Jassen Charron, Rosalie Pépin, James Edward Metayer, Emmanuel Auger		
Sacred Creatures	Frieda Luk	Olivia Luccardi, James Cusati-Moyer, Romina D'Ugo		
A Safe Distance	Gloria Mercer	Bethany Brown, Cody Kearsley, Tandia Mercedes, Chris McNally		
Saigon Story: Two Shootings in the Forest Kingdom	Kim Nugyen			
Saint and the Sea	Abdullah Khan			
The Sandbox	Kenya-Jade Pinto			
Seahorse	Aisha Evelyna	Aisha Evelyna, Joseph Marcell, Ruth Goodwin, Brett Donahue, Alden Aldair		
Searching for Drug Peace	Alisher Balfanbayev			
Send the Rain	Hayley Gray, Kayla Whachell	Erika Prevost, Sachiko Tsujimoto, Dylan Playfair		
Seventeen	Justin Ducharme	Aalayna Primrose, Nizhonniya Austin, Taio Gelinas, Kaniehtiio Horn		
Sheitel: Beauty in the Hidden	Lynda Medjuck Suissa			
Shoot the Messenger	Pranay Noel			
Sitting Bird	Athena Han			
Six Neorealist Portraits (Six portraits néoréalistes)	Robert Morin			
Skinny Boots (Skinny Bottines)	Romain F. Dubois	Dominick Rustam, Aksel Leblanc, Juliette Gariépy		
Smash & Grab: The Rebel Lens of Mike Jones	Justin Simms			
Smudge the Blades	Cody Lightning	Ed Helms, Paulina Alexis, Jana Schmieding		
The Snake	Jenna MacMillan	Susan Kent, Jonathan Torrens, Robin Duke, Dan Petronijevic		
So Long Pluto (Au revoir Pluton)	Sarianne Cormier	Sarah Jeanne Audet, Zakary Belharbi, Raphaëlle Morissette		
Soft Transmission	Sara Wylie			
Someone's Daughter	Wiebke von Carolsfeld	François Arnaud, Pascale Bussières, Peter Outerbridge, Michael Greyeyes		
Sonia Honey	Ameesha Joshi			
Sorority Shark Attack	David Langlois	Kate Mayhew, Sarah Iranca, Marc Rico Ludwig, Paul Matte, Martin Egas, Lee J. Poichuk, Robert Carradine		
Soul Catcher (Haboolm Ksinaalgat)	Amanda Strong, Pamela Post			
Spag	Louis Brousseau			
Starsuckers	Brett and Jason Butler	Manon Ens-Lapointe, Steven Hobé, James Alex, Jersey Anderson, Jacob Stickles		
Still Night, Burning House	Carol Nguyen			
Stranger in Town	Melanie Oates	Sophie Nélisse, Sydney Topliffe, Charlie Carrick		
Stitches	Taylor Olson			
Strong Son	Ian Bawa	Mandeep Sodhi, Amrit Parbhakar, Michaela Kurimsky, Jinder Mahal		
The Stunt Driver	Michael Dowse	Jay Baruchel, Ed Helms, Ben Foster, Dan Bakkedahl, Laurence Leboeuf		
Sunburn	Serville Poblete			
Sundown	Rebekah McKendry			
Sweet Captive	Paul Chotel, Ariane Falardeau St-Amour			
Sweet Handful (Paquet de troubles)	Myriam Guimond	Évelyne Rompré, Zachary Kaddouri-Champagne, Ambre Jabrane, Laetitia Isambert-Denis		
Take Care	Faith Sparrow-Crawford, Scarlett Sparrow-Felix			
təm kʷaθ nan Namesake	Evan Adams, Eileen Francis			
This Above All: The Theatrical Life of Antoni Cimolino	Barry Avrich			
This Love, These Days (Mon amour, c’est pour le restant de mes jours)	André-Line Beauparlant	André-Line Beauparlant, Robert Morin		
Three Kicks at the Can (A Love Story)	Darrell Varga			
Tight Lettuce (Tissé serré)	Harrison Houde	Dakota Daulby, Emmanuel Bilodeau		
Till the Milk Runs Dry	Kalainithan Kalaichelvan			
The Time My Grandmother Was Held Hostage by Bank Robbers	Rosella Tursi			
To Our Future Ancestors	Bogdan Anifrani Fedach, Ian Keteku			
The Tower That Built a City	Mark Myers			
Toy Gun Bandit (Faux gun bandit)	Rémi St-Michel			
Treasure Island (L'Île aux trésors)	Miryam Charles			
Turn It Up!	Sam Scott	Justine Nelson, Gwenlyn Cumyn, Xavier Lopez, Julian Richings		
Turtle Island Rap	Alexandra Lazarowich			
Two Hander	Norah Sadava			
The Ultra Runner	Mila Aung-Thwin			
Ultra Strong	Catherine Lepage			
Under the Same Clouds	Jérémi Roy			
Unholy Night	Michael Gabriele	Marc Bendavid, Shailene Garnett, Morgan Saunders, Ellen David, Ron Lea		
Villeneuve: The Rise of a Legend (Villeneuve : l'ascension d'une légende)	Yan Lanouette Turgeon	Rémi Goulet, Rosalie Bonenfant, Étienne Galloy, Anick Lemay, Joe Cobden		
Virgem Fandango	Marcy Page			
The Voices of Our Mother	Mark O'Brien	Sheila McCarthy, Georgina Reilly, Mark O'Brien, Carolina Bartczak, Alex Ozerov		
Walrus Inc.	Sarah Swire			
We're Kinda Different	Ben Meinhardt			
What We Breathe on Tatooine (Ce qu’on respire sur Tatouine)	Ian Lagarde	Louis Carrière, Amaryllis Tremblay, Catherine Brunet, Stéphane Crête, Moe Jeudy-Lamour		
What We Have Left	Sergio Navarretta			
Whatcha Want	Mina Shum			
Where Everything Comes Together (Là où tout se rassemble)	Guillaume Langlois			
Where the River Begins (Donde comenzia el rio)	Juan Andrés Arango			
#WhileBlack	Sidney Fussell, Jennifer Holness			
The Wind's Thirst	Alejandro Valbuena			
Winner Winner	Ningran Chen			
With You	Samantha Chater			
A Wolf in the Suburbs	Amélie Hardy	Wolf Ruck		
You Will Be Free (Ma fille tu seras libre)	Bachir Bensaddek	Wazhma Bahar, Saba Vahedyousefi, Julie Le Breton		

== See also ==
- 2026 in Canadian television
- 2026 in film
