= 2026 Atlantic International Film Festival =

Canadian film festival

- Opening film: 111 Echoes from Halifax by Mauro Mueller
- Closing film: Ha-Chan, Shake Your Booty! by Josef Kubota Wladyka
- Location: Halifax, Nova Scotia, Canada
- Founded: 1980
- Festival date: September 16–23, 2026
- Website: atlanticfilmfestival.ca

Atlantic International Film Festival
- 2027 2025

The 2026 edition of the Atlantic International Film Festival, the 46th edition in the event's history, took place from September 16 to 23, 2026, in Halifax, Nova Scotia, Canada.

The festival's opening gala, Mauro Mueller's Swiss-Canadian coproduction 111 Echoes from Halifax, was announced in July, and the full program was announced on August 12. Jenna MacMillan's The Snake was the Atlantic Gala film, and the closing gala was Ha-Chan, Shake Your Booty! by Josef Kubota Wladyka.

== Awards ==
Award winners were announced on September 21.

Award	Film	Recipient
Gordon Parsons Award for Best Atlantic Canadian Feature	111 Echoes from Halifax	Mauro Mueller
Gordon Parsons Award for Best Atlantic Canadian Feature, Honorable Mention	Unholy Night	Michael Gabriele
Best Atlantic Canadian Director	The Snake	Jenna MacMillan
Joan Orenstein Award for Outstanding Performance in Acting	The Snake	Susan Kent
David Renton Award for Outstanding Performance in Acting	Jeffrey's Turn	Glen Gould
Best Atlantic Documentary	The Delivery Line: Midwives on the Front Lines	Nance Ackerman
Best Atlantic Short Film	Accismus	Brandy Marien
Best Atlantic Short Film, Honorable Mention	Please Fix Me	Colby Conrad
Best Atlantic Short Documentary	Billie Gauthier: Carving the Future	Jennie Williams
Best Atlantic Short Documentary, Honorable Mention	Eskipesimk	Catherine C. Brown, Jeffrey R. Fish
Michael Weir Award for Best Atlantic Screenwriting	The Snake	Susan Kent
Best Atlantic Cinematographer	The Delivery Line: Midwives on the Front Lines	Nance Ackerman, Glauco Bermudez
Best Atlantic Editor	The Delivery Line: Midwives on the Front Lines	Nance Ackerman
Best Atlantic Original Score	Permanent Damage	Seth A. Smith
Best Animation	Baby Daddy	Joel MacKenzie
Best Animation, Honorable Mention	The Flames of Me (Je m'appelle Daniel)	Daniel Léger
James MacSwain Award for Singular Voice	Walrus, Inc.	Sarah Swire

== Official selections ==
=== Gala Presentations ===
English title	Original title	Director(s)	Production country
111 Echoes from Halifax		Mauro Mueller	Canada, Switzerland
Ha-Chan, Shake Your Booty!		Josef Kubota Wladyka	United States
The Snake		Jenna MacMillan	Canada

=== Reel East Coast Shorts ===
English title	Original title	Director(s)	Province
Billy Gauthier: Carving the Future		Jennie Williams	Canada
The Bookstore That Never Sleeps		Justin Zoras	Canada
Burnt Toast		Brielle Leblanc	Canada
A Cape Breton Storyteller		Geoff D'Eon	Canada
Dough Man		Brittney Gavin, Amy Mielke	Canada
The Flames of Me	Je m'appelle Daniel	Daniel Léger	Canada
Homeless to Home		Andrea Dorfman	Canada
Margot		Marthe Bernard	Canada

=== World Cinema ===
English title	Original title	Director(s)	Production country
A. Rimbaud		Patrick Wang	Canada, United States
All of a Sudden	急に具合が悪くなる / Soudain	Ryûsuke Hamaguchi	France, Japan, Germany, Belgium
Back in Black		Ron Murphy	Canada
The Banquet		Gloria Ui Young Kim	Canada
Coward		Lukas Dhont	Belgium
The Debut		Jesse Eisenberg	United States
Everytime		Sandra Wollner	Austria, Germany
Fjord		Cristian Mungiu	Romania, France, Norway, Sweden, Denmark
I Play Rocky		Peter Farrelly	United States
If I Go Will They Miss Me		Walter Thompson-Hernández	United States
In the Heart of the South		Nyla Innuksuk	Canada
Josephine		Beth de Araújo	United States
The Last Whale Singer		Reza Memari	Germany, Czech Republic, Canada
A Long Winter		Andrew Haigh	United States, Canada, United Kingdom
Mary Magdalene	Marie Madeleine	Gessica Généus	France, Haiti, Belgium, Canada, Luxembourg
Minotaur	Минотавр	Andrey Zvyagintsev	France, Germany, Latvia
Nina Roza		Geneviève Dulude-De Celles	Canada, Belgium, Bulgaria, Italy
The Only Living Pickpocket in New York		Noah Segan	United States
Permanent Damage		Seth A. Smith	Canada
Promised Spaces		Ivan Marković	Serbia, France, Cambodia, Germany
Soumsoum, the Night of the Stars	Soumsoum, la nuit des astres	Mahamat-Saleh Haroun	Chad, France
The Stunt Driver		Michael Dowse	Canada
Tender Loving Care		Mike Leigh	United Kingdom
Two Cuckolds Go Swimming		Winston DeGiobbi	Canada
Where the River Begins	Donde comenzia el rio	Juan Andrés Arango	Canada, Colombia, Norway

=== Narrative New Waves ===
English title	Original title	Director(s)	Production country
Elephants in the Fog	तिनीहरू	Abinash Bikram Shah	Nepal, France, Germany, Brazil, Norway
A Girl Unknown	无名女孩	Zou Jing	China
La Gradiva		Marine Atlan	France, Italy
Hold onto Me	Κράτα Με	Myrsini Aristidou	Cyprus, Denmark, Greece, United States
Honeyjoon		Lilian T. Mehrel	United States, Portugal
Iron Boy	Le Corset	Louis Clichy	France, Belgium
Jeffrey's Turn		Glen Gould	Canada
Julián		Louise Bagnall	Luxembourg, Ireland, Canada, Denmark
Low Expectations	Lave forventninger	Eivind Landsvik	Norway, Denmark
Purgatory		Lindsay Lanzillotta	Canada, United States
Seahorse		Aisha Evelyna	Canada

=== Late Night Visions ===
English title	Original title	Director(s)	Production country
Sleep No More	Monster Pabrik Rambut	Edwin	Indonesia, France, Germany, Japan, Singapore
Sour Minnows		Harrison Atkins	United States
Stitches		Taylor Olson	Canada
Unholy Night		Michael Gabriele	Canada

=== In Focus ===
English title	Original title	Director(s)	Production country
The Adventure of Faustus Bidgood		Michael Jones, Andy Jones	Canada

=== Documentaries ===
English title	Original title	Director(s)	Production country
1000 Women in Horror		Donna Davies	Canada
Al Tuck My Blues Away		Brian Harrington	Canada
Being Still		Joe Bender, Scott Munn	Canada
Captain Newfoundland		Jamie Miller, Mike Feehan	Canada
Ceremony		Banchi Hanuse	Canada
The Cycle of Love		Orlando von Einsiedel	United Kingdom, Sweden
The Delivery Line: Midwives on the Frontlines		Nance Ackerman	Canada
The History of Concrete		John Wilson	United States
Ladies and Gentlemen, Brian Mulroney	Mesdames et Messieurs, Brian Mulroney	Matthew Rankin	Canada
The Last Days of April		Ree Wright, Meaghan Wright	Canada
Nirilaurta: Let Us Eat		Malaya Qaunirq Chapman	Canada
Nuisance Bear		Jack Weisman, Gabriela Osio Vanden	Canada, United States
Once Upon a Time in Harlem		William Greaves, David Greaves	United States
Rehearsals for a Revolution	خاطرات ایران	Pegah Ahangarani	Czech Republic, Spain
Run Terry Run		Sean Menard	Canada
Sheitel: Beauty in the Hidden		Lynda Medjuck Suissa	Canada, Israel, United Kingdom, United States
Smash & Grab: The Rebel Lens of Mike Jones		Justin Simms	Canada
Still Night, Burning House		Carol Nguyen	Canada
To Hold a Mountain		Biljana Tutorov, Petar Glomazić	Montenegro
Turtle Island Rap		Alexandra Lazarowich	Canada
The Ultra Runner		Mila Aung-Thwin	Canada

=== Shorts ===
English title	Original title	Director(s)	Production country
The 80 Blows		Alireza Abbasi	Iran
Accismus		Brandy Marien	Canada
Adgwa-Ata		Zsuzsanna Kreif	Hungary, France
After Closing		François Lalonde	Canada
Baby Daddy		Joel Mackenzie	Canada
Between Late April and Early May		Sophia Smith	Canada
Between Us	Entre nous	Félix Bouffard-Dumas	Canada
Black Water	Lac en cœur	Tim Bouvette	Canada
Collectors		Andrew Cividino	Canada
The Day I Smoked a Cigarette with My Father		Sameh Alaa, Robin Vouters	France, Belgium, Egypt
Easter Day		Mykola Zasieiev	Ukraine, France
The End		Niki Lindroth von Bahr	Sweden, France, Denmark
Eskipesimk		Catherine C. Brown, Jeffrey R. Fish	Canada
Footsteps on the Ceiling		Giran Findlay Liu	Canada
Gal Pals		Margaret Donahoe	Canada
Guard		Tim Mombourquette	Canada
Hooked		Catherine Bussiere	Canada
The Highway		Yung Chang	Canada
A House		Kevin Saychareun	Canada
Kiloran Bay		Michael Bruce	United States
Look at Me		Nikita Morris	Canada
Marga in Mexico City		Gabriela Ortega	Mexico, Dominican Republic, United States
Motherbaby Runs a Race		Rebecca E. Tremblay	Canada
My Father's Soul	Roméo et son corps	Fred Gervais-Dupuis	Canada
Pale Sun	Soleil pâle	Adrian Moyse Dullin, Jawahine Zentar	France
Paying Respects		Jessica Wu	Canada
Piluk		Elisapie, Marc Séguin	Canada
Please Fix Me		Colby Conrad	Canada
Revel		Mishki Vaccaro	Canada
Sisters' Swim	La bain des sirènes	Lola Degove	France, Belgium
Sonia Honey		Ameesha Joshi	Canada
Sulaimani		Vinnie Ann Bose	France
Thank You for Listening		Bob Ray, Gene Gallerano	United States
Three Kicks at the Can (A Love Story)		Darrell Varga	Canada
The Time My Grandmother Was Held Hostage by Bank Robbers		Rosella Tursi	Canada, United States
To Our Future Ancestors	À nos futurs ancêtres	Bogdan Anifrani-Fedach, Ian Keteku	Canada
Treasure Island	L'Île aux trésors	Miryam Charles	Canada
Walrus Inc.		Sarah Swire	Canada
We Were Here		Pranav Bhasin	India
Winner Winner		Ningran Chen	Canada
A Wolf in the Suburbs		Amélie Hardy	Canada
