= King's Court (film) =

- Directed by: Serville Poblete
- Written by: Serville Poblete
- Produced by: Kate Vollum
- Starring: Stephen Danso; Marley Lawrence
- Cinematography: Christian Bielz
- Edited by: Sabrina Budiman
- Music by: Aaron Paris
- Production company: National Film Board of Canada
- Release date: April 28, 2025 (Hot Docs)
- Running time: 20 minutes
- Country: Canada
- Language: English

King's Court is a Canadian short documentary film, directed by Serville Poblete and released in 2025. The film profiles Stephen Danso and Marley Lawrence, two friends living in high-rise apartment towers on Bleecker Street in the St. James Town neighbourhood of Toronto, who regularly meet to play basketball on the community courts.

The film premiered at the 2025 Hot Docs Canadian International Documentary Festival, and was later distributed for viewing on the National Film Board of Canada's free streaming platform.

The film received a Canadian Screen Award nomination for Best Short Documentary at the 14th Canadian Screen Awards in 2026.

== See also ==
- List of basketball films
