= Lovely (2024 film) =

2024 Canadian drama film

- Directed by: Serville Poblete
- Written by: Mark Bacolcol
- Produced by: Mark Bacolcol; Serville Poblete; Shai Barcia; Jason Gosbee
- Starring: Mark Bacolcol; Victoria Lenhardt; Melika Ghali; Elton Tannis
- Cinematography: Serville Poblete
- Edited by: Serville Poblete
- Music by: Alec Switzman
- Production company: New Radio Pictures
- Release date: October 26, 2024 (Reelworld)
- Running time: 108 minutes
- Country: Canada
- Language: English

Lovely is a Canadian drama film, directed by Serville Poblete and released in 2024. His second collaboration with actor Mark Bacolcol following 2021's Altar Boy, the film stars Bacolcol as Lee, an up-and-coming boxer from the projects who starts to question his dream once an unforeseen circumstance enters his life.

The cast also includes Melika Ghali as Lee's best friend Nate and Elton Tannis as his boxing coach Leonard, as well as Cole Porter Healey, Shai Barcia, Savannah Bangoura, Matthew Mugoa, Joshua Obra, Kathy Rupcic, Stu Arthur, Pablo S.J. Quiogue, Keith Singer, Farah Khan Baig, April Park, Fred Grosselfuenger, Julian Gray and Charmaine Magumbe in supporting roles.

The film premiered at the 2024 Reelworld Film Festival.

== Awards ==
It was longlisted for the 2024 Jean-Marc Vallée DGC Discovery Award.
