= Best Boy (disambiguation) =

Best boy is a film crew position, held by the chief assistant to various technical leads.

It may also refer to:

- Best Boy (1979 film), a documentary film directed by Ira Wohl,
- Best Boy (2025 film), a thriller film directed by Jesse Noah Klein.
