= A Small Fortune =

- Film poster
- Directed by: Adam Perry
- Written by: Adam Perry
- Produced by: Jason Arsenault; Jenna MacMillan; Mary Sexton
- Starring: Stephen Oates; Liane Balaban; Joel Thomas Hynes
- Cinematography: Jeff Wheaton
- Edited by: Justin Oakey
- Music by: Andrew Staniland
- Production company: Saltwater Films
- Distributed by: levelFilm
- Release date: September 18, 2021 (AFF)
- Running time: 91 minutes
- Country: Canada
- Language: English

A Small Fortune is a 2021 Canadian crime drama film, written and directed by Adam Perry. The film stars Stephen Oates as Kevin Doucette, a man living in a small village in Prince Edward Island who makes a subsistence living harvesting sea moss on the coast; resisting the urging of his wife Sam (Liane Balaban) that he leave the province to look for more stable and well-paying work, one day he finds a large stash of money on the beach and hides it for himself, only to be drawn into danger when Troy (Joel Thomas Hynes) arrives looking for it.

The cast also includes Matt Cooke and Andrea Bang as police officers.

The film, Perry's feature directorial debut, was an expansion of his earlier short film A Blessing from the Sea, and received funding from Telefilm Canada in 2019.

The film premiered at the FIN Atlantic Film Festival in September 2021, and was screened at the Charlottetown Film Festival in October. It was subsequently screened at the 2022 Manchester Film Festival, where it won the award for Best Screenplay, and at the 2022 Canadian Film Festival, before going into commercial release in April 2022.

== Critical response ==
Chris Knight of Postmedia rated the film 3.5 stars out of five, writing that the film "carries with it appealing echoes of the Coen brothers’ classic No Country for Old Men. But it’s no copycat. This is a tightly written, expertly shot and well crafted story. It hails from the nation’s tiniest province, but it’s no small potatoes."

Jennie Punter of Original Cin rated the film a B, and compared it more to Sam Raimi's 1998 film A Simple Plan. She wrote that "The performances, storytelling, visuals, and music (original score by Andrew Staniland) are all excellent, coming together in what is both a labour of love and an impressive calling card for writer-director Adam Perry."

Daniel Reynolds of Brief Take rated the film only 2.5 stars, writing that "Unfortunately for his cast of characters, Perry’s film drags on just a tad too long. A Small Fortune does achieve what it set out to do, and sure, it does land on some decent enough images (especially where the plastic money is concerned). But we’ve already seen how this story tends to play out. And there’s just not quite enough here—Canadian or otherwise—to keep us engaged forever."
