= The Secret Adventures of Jules Verne =

Television series

- Created by: Gavin Scott
- Starring: Michael Praed; Michel Courtemanche; Chris Demetral
- Opening theme: "The Secret Adventures of Jules Verne Theme" by Nick Glennie-Smith
- Country of origin: Canada
- No. of seasons: 1
- No. of episodes: 22

Production
- Executive producers: Nicolas Clermont; Pierre de Lespinois; Neil Dunn; Michael Huffington; Richard Jackson; Gavin Scott
- Producer: Michael Mullally
- Running time: 60 min.

Original release
- Network: CBC
- Release: 18 June – 16 December 2000

The Secret Adventures of Jules Verne is a Canadian science fiction television series that aired on CBC in Canada from June to December 2000, lasting for one season. The show is a fictionalized telling of the life of French author Jules Verne, placing him into the settings of the stories he wrote such as Twenty Thousand Leagues Under the Seas and Around the World in Eighty Days. In the United States, the show aired on the Sci-Fi Channel, premiering in early 2001. The Secret Adventures of Jules Verne was the first television series to be filmed in high-definition video, which made the series expensive to produce.

== Plot ==
The show features a fictionalized portrayal of French author Jules Verne (Chris Demetral), along with portrayals of the characters Jean Passepartout (Michel Courtemanche) and Phileas Fogg (Michael Praed), both originating from Verne's 1873 work Around the World in Eighty Days. A new character is also created for the show: Phileas Fogg's cousin Rebecca (Francesca Hunt). The show's premise is of a young Verne being placed into scenarios similar to those of his stories prior to his having written them. Many of the show's settings are portrayed via special effects and computer-generated imagery. Publicity for the show described its imagery as being steampunk.

== Production ==
The show was filmed in Montreal, Quebec at an estimated cost of $30,000,000 CAD. According to the Montreal Gazette, it was the most expensive television series ever shot in the city. English screenwriter Gavin Scott, who created the series, worked with producer Michael Mullally and production company Talisman Films to create the show. Executive producer Pierre de Lespinois chose to film in Montreal due to the city's architecture. The Secret Adventures of Jules Verne was the first television series to be recorded entirely in high-definition video; specifically, it used the HDCAM, a digital camera manufactured by Sony.

== Broadcast ==
The show first aired on CBC in Canada in 2000. It was then broadcast in the United States on the Sci-Fi Channel, premiering in early 2001.

== Episodes ==
Episode	Title	Notable guest stars
1.	In the Beginning	David Warner and Rick Overton
2.	Queen Victoria and the Giant Mole	Tracy Scoggins
3.	Rockets of the Dead	Patrick Duffy
4.	The Cardinal's Design	John Rhys-Davies and René Auberjonois
5.	The Cardinal's Revenge	John Rhys-Davies and René Auberjonois
6.	The Eyes of Lazarus	Michael Moriarty and Margot Kidder
7.	Lord of Air and Darkness	Sonia Vigneault and Rick Overton
8.	Southern Comfort	Larissa Laskin, Sonia Vigneault and Rick Overton
9.	Let There Be Light	Michael Yarmush
10.	The Ballad of Steeley Joe	
11.	The Black Glove of Melchizedek	Kim Chan and Nigel Bennett
12.	Dust to Dust	Pascale Bussieres
13.	The Golem	Caroline Dhavernas
14.	Crusader in the Crypt	
15.	The Strange Death of Professor Marechal	Polly Draper
16.	The Rocket's Red Glare	Rick Overton
17.	Rocket to the Moon	R. H. Thomson
18.	The Inquisitor	Mako
19.	Royalty	Geordie Johnson
20.	Secret of the Realm	Rick Overton
21.	The Victorian Candidate	Bill Paterson and Keir Cutler
22.	The Book of Knowledge	David Warner and Michael McManus

== Critical reception ==
An uncredited review in the Times-Picayune rated the show 2.5 out of 4 stars, stating that "With its dark humor, odd machines of the Industrial Revolution, campy derring-do and attractive stars, The Secret Adventures of Jules Verne holds promise." Tom Shales of The Washington Post was less favorable, describing the show's premise as "silly" while also criticizing the directing, script, and characterization of Verne.

== Soundtrack ==
The series' main theme and incidental music was composed by Nick Glennie-Smith. In April 2011, Perseverance Records released a 2-CD soundtrack of the series' music. The soundtrack included the main theme, closing theme, "bumpers" (played at commercial breaks), and suites from every episode of the series apart from "The Book of Knowledge", for which the composer and the recording studio were unable to locate the original tapes.

CD 1
No.	Title	Length
1	Opening Titles	0:53
2	In the Beginning	2:34
3	Queen Victoria and the Giant Mole	13:25
4	Bumper #1	0:09
5	Rockets of the Dead	11:31
6	The Cardinal's Design	2:04
7	The Cardinal's Revenge	2:33
8	The Eyes of Lazarus	2:00
9	Bumper #2	0:11
10	Lord of Air and Darkness	1:56
11	Southern Comfort	19:05
12	Let There Be Light	7:56
13	The Ballad of Steeley Joe	6:51
14	Bumper #3	0:09
CD 2
No.	Title	Length
1	Bumper #4	0:09
2	The Black Glove of Melchizedek	9:02
3	Dust to Dust	6:17
4	The Golem	3:51
5	Crusader in the Crypt	1:53
6	The Strange Death of Professor Marechal	4:32
7	The Rocket's Red Glare	5:53
8	Rocket to the Moon	3:55
9	Bumper #5	0:09
10	The Inquisitor	5:25
11	Royalty	12:38
12	Secret of the Realm	6:00
13	The Victorian Candidate	7:27
14	End Credits	0:42
