= Marc Bendavid =

Canadian actor

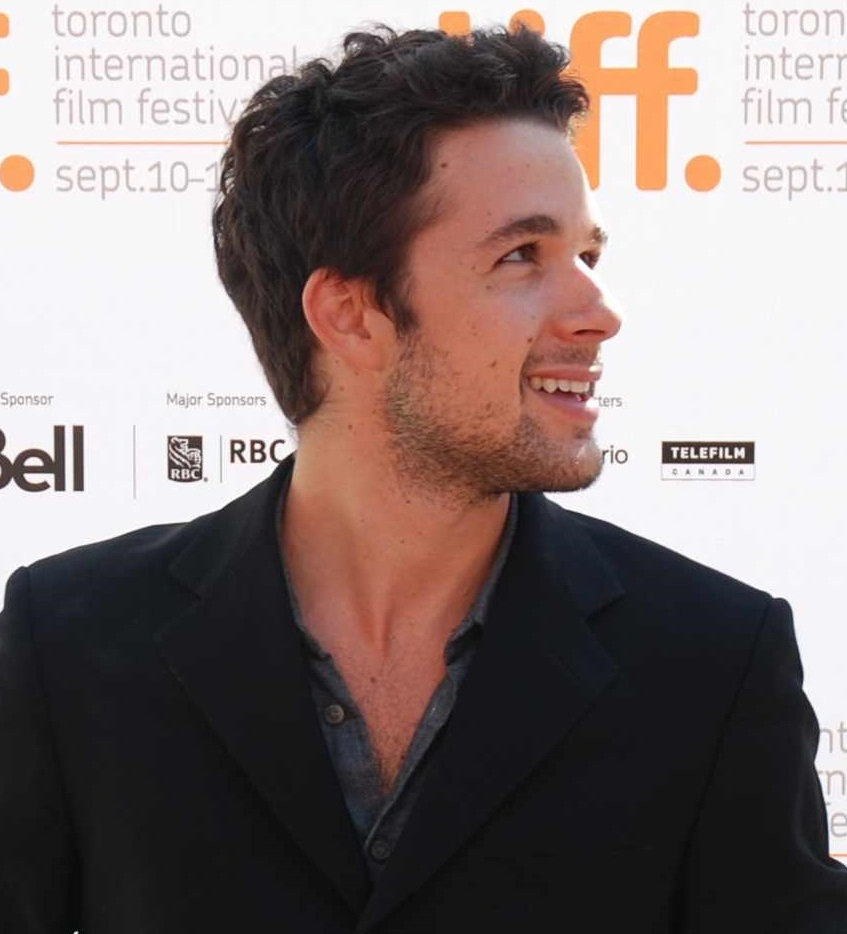
- Bendavid in 2009
- Born: June 10, 1986 (age 40); Toronto, Ontario, Canada
- Education: National Theatre School of Canada
- Occupations: Actor; author
- Years active: 2004–present

Marc Bendavid (born June 10, 1986) is a Canadian actor and author.

== Early life ==
Marc Bendavid was born in Toronto, Ontario, Canada, to a Belgian mother and a Moroccan Jewish father. He attended Unionville High School and was subsequently accepted into National Theatre School of Canada, graduating in 2004.

== Career ==
Bendavid played the role of Barbara Hershey's character's son Dominic Blythe in Anne of Green Gables: A New Beginning. He played the role Romeo in the play Romeo and Juliet. He has also appeared on the television drama Murdoch Mysteries and in thrillers, Too Late to Say Goodbye and Her Husband's Betrayal. Bendavid has guest starred in several of Canada's top series, including The Listener and Flashpoint, as well as recurring roles in Hard Rock Medical, Bitten, and Degrassi.

Bendavid has appeared onstage including roles in Salvatore Antonio's play In Gabriel's Kitchen at Buddies in Bad Times theatre and Michel Marc Bouchard's The Madonna Painter at Toronto's Factory Theatre, and Arthur Miller's A View from the Bridge.

In 2014, Bendavid was cast in the role of "One" (a.k.a. Jace Corso, a.k.a. Derrick Moss) on the Canadian science fiction television series Dark Matter, which airs on the Space network in Canada (and on Syfy in the U.S.). The series debuted in the summer of 2015. He had a supporting role as Owen Thomas in Hallmark Original Movie Angel of Christmas.

In 2016, Bendavid had a leading role as Phillip in the Hallmark original movie Summer in the City premiering August 13 on Hallmark Channel, opposite Julianna Guill with Marla Sokoloff, Vivica A. Fox and Natasha Henstridge. In 2017, he played the role of Cliff Baskers in the Hallmark original movie A Rose for Christmas opposite Rachel Boston. In 2022, he had a recurring role in half of the eight-episode first season of Reacher playing Paul Hubble, a banker who is manipulated into helping launder counterfeit money.

In 2025, Bendavid wrote his debut novel titled The Sapling. He won the Kobo Emerging Writer Prize for fiction in 2026.

== Personal life ==
In May 2023, he announced he had been dating actor François Arnaud for a year.

== Filmography ==
=== Films ===
Year	Title	Role	Notes	Ref.
2007	Late Fragment	Mike	Debut film	
2008	Us Chickens	Dean McMurtry	Short film	
2009	Man v. Minivan	Shane	Short film	
2010	Period Drama Trilogy		Video Short	
2016	Cycles	Actor	Short film	
2019	Elsewhere	Unknown		
2025	Best Boy	Eli		
2026	Unholy Night	Gino		

=== Television ===
Year	Title	Role	Notes
2007	Air Crash Investigation	Raymond Chalifoux	Episode: "Fire Fight"
2008	Anne of Green Gables: A New Beginning	Dominic Blythe	Television film (CTV)
2008	The Border	Lt. Ike	Episode: "Shifting Waters"
2009	Booky's Crush	Russell	Television film (CBC)
2009, 2012, 2017	Murdoch Mysteries	Robert Perry	Episodes: "Big Murder on Campus", "Murdoch in Toyland & "The Devil Inside"
2009	Too Late to Say Goodbye	Sam Malveau	Television film (Lifetime)
2011	Flashpoint	Josh	Episode: "A Day in the Life"
2011	Nikita	Press Agent	Episodes: "Knightfall" & "Partners"
2013	The Listener	Charlie Satie	Episode: "Cold Storage"
2013, 2015	Hard Rock Medical	Dylan	Guest role (Seasons 1–2); 6 episodes
2013	Her Husband's Betrayal	Dan Gresham	Television film (Lifetime)
2014	Bitten	Scott Brandon	Guest role (Season 1); 3 episodes
2014	Degrassi	Grant Yates	Guest role (Season 13); 4 episodes
2015	Angel of Christmas	Owen Thomas	Television film (Hallmark)
2015–2017	Dark Matter	One / Jace Corso / Derrick Moss	Main role (season 1); Guest role (season 2); 16 episodes
2016	Summer in the City	Phillip	Television film (Hallmark)
2017	A Rose for Christmas	Cliff Baskers	Television film (Hallmark)
2017–2019	How to Buy a Baby	Charlie	Main role (Seasons 1–2); 20 episodes
2018	Ransom	Bruno Lessio	Episode: "Radio Silence"
2019–2021	Good Witch	Donovan Davenport	Main role (Season 5–7)
2020	Abducted on Air	Alex Peterson	Television Film
2022	Reacher	Paul Hubble	Recurring role (Season 1); 4 episodes
