= Sunburn (2026 film) =

2026 Canadian comedy film

- Directed by: Serville Poblete
- Written by: Serville Poblete
- Produced by: Nicole Dane; Serville Poblete
- Starring: Joshua Obra; Dashawn Blackwood; Arianna Shannon; Milan Deng
- Cinematography: Christian Bielz
- Edited by: Serville Poblete
- Music by: Aaron Paris
- Production companies: Serve; Tinygiant
- Release date: September 14, 2026 (TIFF)
- Running time: 82 minutes
- Country: Canada
- Language: English

Sunburn is a Canadian comedy-drama film, directed by Serville Poblete and released in 2026. The film centres on a group of young adult friends in Toronto, Ontario, wandering the streets of the St. James Town neighbourhood in search of adventure in a power outage during a summer heat wave.

The cast includes Joshua Obra and Dashawn Blackwood as Shay and Vince, as well as Arianna Shannon, Milan Deng, Trinity Lloyd and Ericka Leobrera in supporting roles.

== Production ==
In an interview earlier in 2026 regarding his short documentary film In the Morning Sun, Poblete noted that the earlier film's scene of his father whistling inspired him to write a similar scene into Sunburn.

== Distribution ==
The film premiered in the Centrepiece program at the 2026 Toronto International Film Festival. Sales rights have been acquired by MoreThan Films.

== Critical response ==
For That Shelf, Courtney Small wrote that "thanks in part to the strong performances and effortless chemistry of the multi-ethnic ensemble cast, the audience truly feels as if they are a part of the St. James community. One where older teens like Shay and Vince ensure that all the younger kids they meet have everything they need to survive. By keeping the parents at the margins of the film, Poblete’s film allows room for his characters to sort out their various emotions amongst each other."

== Awards ==
At TIFF, the film won the award for Best Canadian Film.
