= Unholy Night (film) =

2026 Canadian film

- Theatrical release poster
- Directed by: Michael Gabriele
- Written by: Michael Gabriele; Jef Burnham
- Produced by: Jason Levangie; Jenna MacMillan; Marc Tétrault
- Starring: Marc Bendavid; Shailene Garnett; Jacqueline Robbins
- Music by: Ethan Lawrence
- Production companies: Club Red Productions; Shut Up & Colour Pictures
- Distributed by: Game Theory Films
- Release dates: July 25, 2026 (Fantasia); December 4, 2026 (Canada)
- Running time: 94 minutes
- Country: Canada
- Language: English

Unholy Night is a Canadian horror film, written and directed by Michael Gabriele and released in 2026. The film stars Marc Bendavid as Gino, an underachieving young man whose Italian Canadian family's Christmas dinner is disrupted when the reanimated corpse of his late grandmother (Jacqueline Robbins) arrives to embark on a killing spree, forcing Gino to step up and protect his family.

The cast also includes Shailene Garnett as Gino's ex-girlfriend Rene, as well as Al Sapienza, Ron Lea, Cristina Rosato, Ellen David, Toni Ellwand and Joe Pingue in supporting roles.

The film, Gabriele's full-length directorial debut, premiered at the 30th Fantasia International Film Festival in July 2026, where it won the Gold Audience Award for Canadian films. It was subsequently screened at the 2026 Atlantic International Film Festival, where it received an honorable mention for the Gordon Parsons Award for Best Atlantic Canadian Feature.

== Release ==
The film is scheduled to be released in Canada on December 4, 2026, as well as a release on Shudder the same day.
