= 2026 in Canadian television =

This article lists notable events affecting Canadian television in 2026. Events listed include television show debuts, finales, cancellations, and channel launches, closures and rebrandings.

== Notable events ==
=== February ===
Date	Event	Source
6–22	The 2026 Winter Olympics in Milan and Cortina d'Ampezzo, Italy airs on CBC and streaming on CBC Gem in English, Ici Télé and streaming on Ici TOU.TV in French, and cable networks TSN and Sportsnet in English, and RDS in French.	

=== June ===
Date	Event	Source
11 – July 19	The 2026 FIFA World Cup airs on all the Bell Media networks including CTV, TSN, and streaming services Crave and TSN+ in English, as well as Noovo and RDS in French. Jointly hosted by sixteen cities in Canada, Mexico and the United States, the 23rd edition of the tournament is the first to be hosted by three nations, the first FIFA World Cup to be held in North America since 1994, the first to feature 48 teams, and the first to be held in Canada with host cites Toronto and Vancouver.	
16	CBC Television announces it would no longer sublicense National Hockey League game rights from Sportsnet for Hockey Night in Canada, marking an end to NHL games on the public broadcaster that began with the network's launch in 1952, and continued through the 2025–26 season via sublicensing deals with Sportsnet owner Rogers Sports & Media (who has possessed exclusive national media rights to the league since 2014). The decision effectively ends the public broadcaster's involvement in major professional sports, as the network's contract with the Canadian Football League ended in 2007, and its rights to the Toronto Blue Jays expired after 2008. Rogers also announced at the same time that it was withdrawing all NHL games from its own over-the-air outlets, Citytv and Omni Television, and making the league exclusive to subscription platforms.	
25	The Canadian Broadcasting Corporation is approved for full membership in the European Broadcasting Union. In addition to newsgathering and content-sharing with European broadcast networks, this is followed on July 1 by the announcement of Canada's participation in the Eurovision Song Contest 2027.	

=== August ===
Date	Event	Source
22	CBC Television airs a tenth anniversary rebroadcast of the 2016 Kingston concert by The Tragically Hip, which marked the end of their farewell Man Machine Poem Tour and was one of the most widely watched television broadcasts in Canadian history when it was originally broadcast.	
31	Streaming platform Victory+ shuts down. The platform, a joint venture between the Dallas Stars (a United States-based hockey team) and Canadian media company A Parent Media Company, was an attempt to adapt a free ad-supported streaming television model to major professional sports. The venture had largely begun to collapse in July following the cancellation of many of its rights contracts and the failure of A Parent Media Co. (otherwise doing business as Kidoodle.TV) to cover rights fees or produce some of the non-major sports telecasts in its portfolio that had been scheduled for August. As a stopgap measure, the Western Hockey League, the most prominent Canadian sports rights package that the company held, began releasing its live game streams for free on YouTube for the 2026–27 season.	

== Future events ==
=== December ===
Date	Event	Source
5	The Professional Women's Hockey League will take over the Hockey Night in Canada franchise with the first contest in an eight-game slate, keeping the brand alive on CBC Television with a reduced schedule after the CBC's loss of NHL rights (see June entry above). For the first time since 2002, the French counterpart of HNIC will be included, as the PWHL's agreement with the CBC includes exclusive rights to the PWHL's Montreal Victoire for Radio-Canada.	

== Programs ==
=== Programs debuting in 2026 ===
Start date	Show	Channel	Source
January 6	Hoop Nations	APTN	
January 7	Searchers	APTN	
January 8	Animal Nation	APTN	
January 9	Pitago Stop	APTN	
January 22	Finding Her Edge	CBC Television	
February 2	The Legacy Lounge	CBC Gem	
February 8	The Borderline	CTV, Crave	
March 10	The Price Is Right Tonight	Citytv	
March 19	Cirque Life	CBC Television	
March 27	Blue Collar	Crave	
April 3	The County	HGTV	
April 9	Life Is Messy	Home Network	
April 10	Andy's East Coast Kitchen Crawl	Food Network	
May 6	Small Town Escapes	HGTV	
May 7	Bon Cop, Bad Cop	Crave	
May 14	All In	AMI-tv	
July 6	Canada's Drag Race All Stars	Crave	
July 17	Young Farts RV Parts	Prime Video	
October 25	Home Town Takeover Canada	HGTV	
November 2	Pass the Salt	OutTV	

=== Programs ending in 2026 ===
End date	Show	Channel	First aired	Status	Source
March 28	Family Law	Global	2021	Ended	
April	Hockey Night in Canada: Punjabi Edition	Omni Television	2008	Cancelled	
June 21	The Way Home	W Network	2023	Ended	

=== Specials ===
Date	Show	Channel	Source
March 30	Juno Awards of 2026	CBC	
May 31	14th Canadian Screen Awards	CBC; CTV; Global	
September 13	2026 Canadian Country Music Association Awards	CTV	
November 15	113th Grey Cup	CTV, TSN	

== Networks and services ==
=== Network closures ===
Network	Type	Closure date	Notes
BabyTV	Cable/satellite	August 7	
Documentary Channel	Cable/satellite	September 1	
E!	Cable/satellite	December 31	

== Deaths ==
Date	Name	Age	Notes	Sources
January 1	André Provencher	76	Former president of programming for TVA	
January 30	Catherine O'Hara	71	Actress (Schitt's Creek, Second City Television, The Studio), Emmy winner (1982, 2020)	
June 24	David Clayton-Thomas	84	English-born Canadian singer (The David Clayton-Thomas Show)	
July 2	Tommy Hunter	89	Country musician (Country Hoedown, The Tommy Hunter Show)	
July 7	Marc Messier	78	Actor	
July 29	Scott Hylands	83	Actor (Night Heat)	
August 4	Lloyd Robertson	92	Journalist (CTV News)	
August 5	Tedde Moore	79	Actress	
August 26	Peter Cullen	85	Announcer and voice actor	
August 27	Jacques Doucet	86	Sportscaster (TVA Sports)	
October 2	Sass Jordan	65	Rock singer and judge on Canadian Idol	
October 25	Eric Bauza	46	Voice actor	

== See also ==
- List of Canadian films of 2026
