= In Gabriel's Kitchen =

Play by Salvatore Antonio

In Gabriel's Kitchen is the debut play of Salvatore Antonio, centering on an Italian-Canadian family's reaction to their son's homosexuality. The play was first produced at Buddies in Bad Times Theatre from 7–26 March 2006. The production was directed by David Oiye. Marc Bendavid played the title role and Kristopher Turner as his boyfriend.

== Reception ==
In the Toronto Star, Richard Ouzounian gave it two and a half stars, noting the play's division into two parts and writing, "the parts of the proceedings that are good are really first rate, but the rest slide a considerable distance down the critical scale."

In The Globe and Mail, Kamal Al-Solaylee gave it two stars and said it was "as heartfelt, elegiac and ultimately as awkward" as the first kiss shared by the lead characters of the play.

In the Toronto Sun, John Coulbourn rated it two and a half stars, writing that it "disappoints not so much in the quality of the fare, but rather in the utter blandness that all the Sicilian spicing in the world cannot hide."
