= Fast Horse =

- Directed by: Alexandra Lazarowich
- Distributed by: Handful of Films
- Release date: 2018
- Running time: 13
- Country: Canada
- Languages: Siksika, English

Fast Horse is a 2018 documentary film by Alexandra Lazarowich. It won the Special Jury Award at Sundance, and the Best Documentary Work Short Format Award at the 2018 ImagineNATIVE Film and Media Arts Festival. It also received three Golden Sheaf Awards at the 2019 Yorkton Film Festival.
