= Gloria Ui Young Kim =

Korean Canadian director and screenwriter

Gloria Ui Young Kim is a Korean Canadian film and television director and screenwriter, most noted as director of the films Queen of the Morning Calm and Left for Dead: The Ashley Reeves Story.

Born in Seoul, South Korea, she moved to Toronto, Ontario in childhood. She studied English literature at the University of Toronto, and worked as a journalist for Maclean's before studying filmmaking at the Canadian Film Centre's Directors Lab in 2008.

Kim made a number of short films, including Partial Selves (2000), Rock Garden: A Love Story (2007), The Auction (2010), Why Do I Dance? (2012) and Flamenco Movie (2015) before winning an award from Women in the Directors Chair in 2016 toward the production of Queen of the Morning Calm. The film went into production in November 2018, and had its theatrical premiere at the 2019 Whistler Film Festival. The film was subsequently screened as part of the 2020 Canadian Film Festival, where it won the award for William F. White Reel Canadian Indie, and Kim won the award for Best Director.

The television movie Left for Dead, produced in Canada by Cineflix, premiered in 2021 on Lifetime. Kim received a Canadian Screen Award nomination for Best Direction in a TV Movie at the 10th Canadian Screen Awards in 2022.

She has also directed episodes of the television series It's My Party!, Odd Squad, Coroner, Heartland and Murdoch Mysteries. She received a Canadian Screen Award nomination for Best Direction in a Children's or Youth Program or Series at the 8th Canadian Screen Awards in 2020 for It's My Party!.

Her second feature film, The Banquet, premiered at the 2026 Atlantic International Film Festival.
