= Sacred Creatures =

2026 Canadian drama film

- Directed by: Frieda Luk
- Written by: Frieda Luk; Chris Sanchez
- Produced by: Ines Eisses; Frieda Luk; Chris Sanchez; Marco Serrecchia; Raha Shirazi
- Starring: Olivia Luccardi; James Cusati-Moyer; Antonio De Matteo; Romina D'Ugo
- Cinematography: Nicolas Villegas
- Edited by: Fabiola Caraza
- Production companies: My Sister Miriam Films; Prowler Pictures; Doppio Nodo Double Bind
- Release date: August 16, 2026 (Edinburgh)
- Running time: 105 minutes
- Countries: Canada; Italy
- Languages: English; Italian

Sacred Creatures is a comedy-drama film, written and directed by Frieda Luk and released in 2026.

A coproduction of companies from Canada and Italy, the film stars Olivia Luccardi as Miriam, a Canadian woman who has recently been released from a psychiatric hospital after experiencing a psychotic episode that she understood as a spiritual awakening. Travelling to the home in Piedmont, Italy, that her brother Ray (James Cusati-Moyer) shares with his husband Renzo (Antonio De Matteo) to reunite with Ray and their other sister Michelle (Romina D'Ugo) after several years apart, things take a turn when Miriam starts to become venerated by the local community as a cult leader.

The cast also includes Pia Engleberth, Giovanni Anzaldo, Donatella Bartoli, Luca Castellano, Sebastiano Kininger, Gianvincenzo Pugliese and Edoardo Rossi in supporting roles.

== Production ==
Luk received funding from Telefilm Canada's English-language funding program in 2022, and participated in the Inside Out Film and Video Festival's film financing program in 2023.

== Distribution ==
The film premiered at the 2026 Edinburgh International Film Festival.

== Critical response ==
Lee Marshall of Screen Daily wrote that "a restrained, open-ended finale regains some audience trust, but it’s not enough to make us believe in this Italian community’s mute, adoring surrender to the power of a guru whose teachings sound AI-generated. Is this a satire on our credulous times? Or a drama about family members that identify the black sheep in their midst without seeing their own failings? Or a very Canadian black comedy about overseas dangers? Sacred Creatures is a film whose multiple readings feel a little like a lucky dip. But this is still an ambitious debut, confidently staged and shot (despite an over-indulged penchant for extreme shallow focus), that marks writer-director Luk out as a talent to watch."

For Variety, Guy Lodge wrote that "Sacred Creatures starts to lose its satirical footing, however, as Miriam becomes a veritable cult leader and even a religious icon, the scope of proceedings expanding so fast and so far that credibility is strained past breaking point. The sibling drama, meanwhile, rather fades out of view amid these loftier goings-on; the film’s narrative begins to feel devised by the old parlor game Consequences, repeatedly wrenched in erratic new directions. It holds your attention, though, as does the filmmaking, with its muted, desaturated canvas with key, unsettling stylistic flourishes: DP Nicolas Villegas’ queasy deployment of shallow focus, disorientingly muffled sound design at certain junctures, and of course that dress, ostensibly bound to a character, but floating through this world like an unknowable spirit."
