= Michel Courtemanche =

Canadian mime artist

Michael Courtemanche
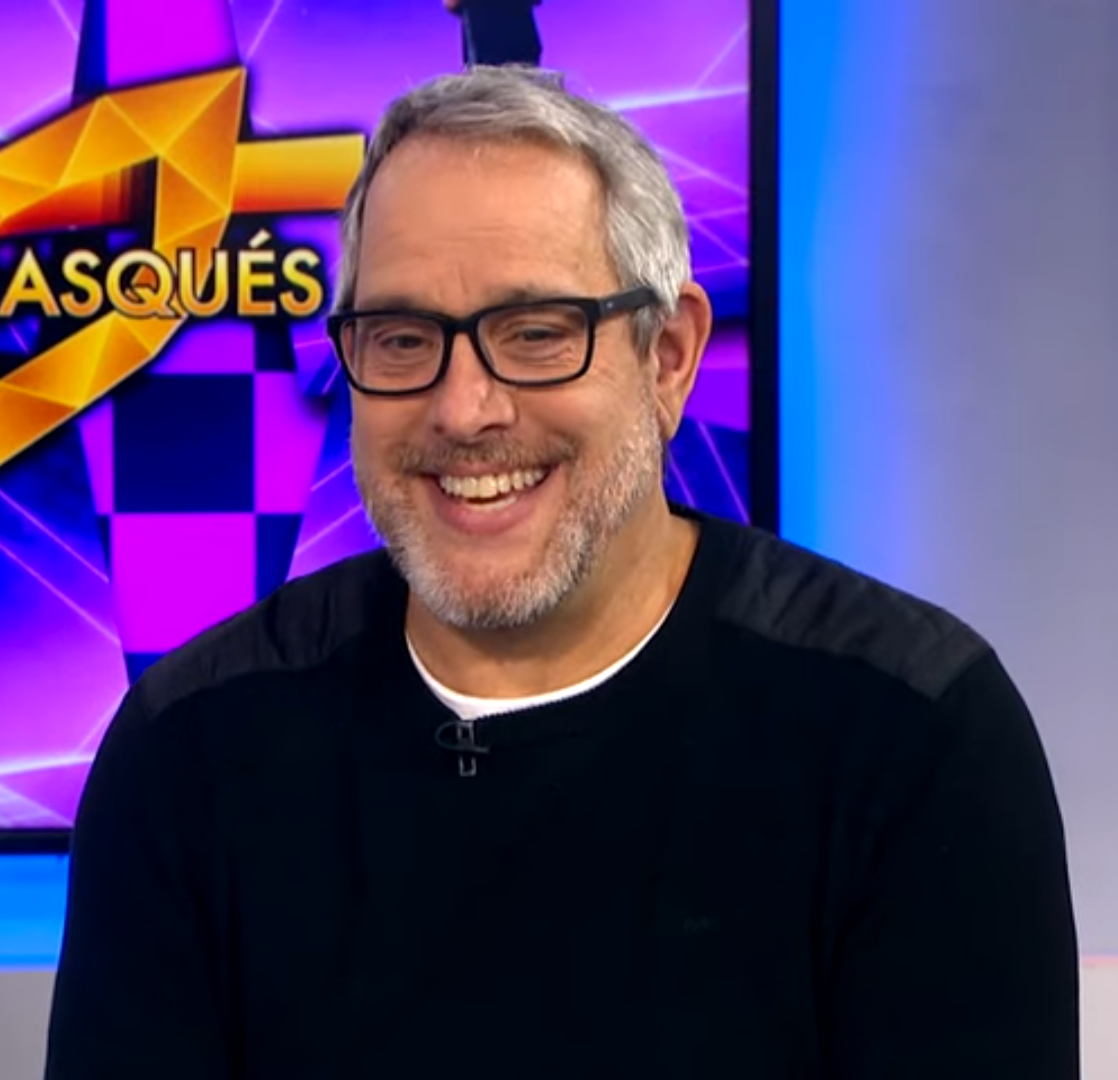
- Born: December 11, 1964 (age 61); Laval, Quebec, Canada
- Occupations: Actor, comedian

Michel Courtemanche (French pronunciation: [miʃɛl kuʁtəmɑ̃ʃ]; born December 11, 1964) is a Canadian comedian and actor from Quebec.

== Career ==
His debut one-man show, A New Comic is Born, ran for more than five hundred performances and earned him two Felix nominations. It was first performed in Montreal in 1989. His second, The New Adventures of Michel Courtemanche, first performed in 1992, filled theatres in both North America and Europe and spawned his second international hit video (1993).

Courtemanche has internationally sold out large theatres, and has inspired a hardcover comic book. Courtemanche appeared in Québécois films Nuit de Noces and Karmina 2, and on the Secret Adventures of Jules Verne television series, on American pay television channel Syfy.

His style of comedy can be described as mime combined with sound effects, as he is most often seen interacting with invisible objects or even people and using his voice to complete the scene. He is also known for making remarkable grimaces.

In 2002, he moved from acting to working behind the camera. His production company, Encore Télévision, produces the French-Canadian edition of the sitcom Caméra café, which was adapted from French television.

== Awards and honors ==
- Asteroid 63129 Courtemanche, discovered by Swiss astronomer Stefano Sposetti in 2000, was named in his honor. The official naming citation was published by the Minor Planet Center on June 13, 2006 (M.P.C. 56962).

== Filmography ==
- 1997 - La ballade de Titus
- 2000 - Secret Adventures of Jules Verne
- 2001 - Karmina 2
- 2021 - Livrés chez vous sans contact
- 2026 - The Pichenotte (La Pichenotte)

== See also ==
- Culture of Quebec
- Humor of Quebec
- List of Quebec comedians
