= Altar Boy =

2021 Canadian drama film

- Directed by: Serville Poblete
- Written by: Mark Bacolcol
- Produced by: Mark Bacolcol; Serville Poblete
- Starring: Mark Bacolcol; Shai Barcia
- Cinematography: David T. Nguyen
- Edited by: Serville Poblete
- Music by: Rob McLay; Alfonso Viscido
- Production company: New Radio Pictures
- Distributed by: Mongrel Media
- Release date: December 2, 2021 (Whistler)
- Running time: 104 minutes
- Country: Canada
- Languages: English; Filipino

Altar Boy is a 2021 Canadian coming-of-age drama film, directed by Serville Poblete. The film stars Mark Bacolcol as Daniel Garcia, a Filipino Canadian teenager who is struggling to chart his own independent course in life against the wishes of his domineering, deeply religious mother Rose (Shai Barcia).

The cast also includes Pablo S.J. Quiogue, Emily Beattie, Denzel Brooks, Blake Canning, Steve Kasan, Matt Maenpaa, Farah Baig, Dan Sanderson, Beverley Ellis, John Reyes, Kareen Tacderas, Leo Men, Sabina Moore, Marjillet Angeles, Andrew Ravindran and Cameron Stewart.

The film premiered in the Borsos Competition program at the 2021 Whistler Film Festival.
