= 111 Echoes from Halifax =

2026 Canadian-Swiss drama film

- Directed by: Mauro Mueller
- Written by: Jennie Allen; Mauro Mueller
- Produced by: Björn Hering; Anne Walser; Ann Bernier
- Starring: Kris Holden-Ried; Natalie Brown; Ursina Lardi
- Cinematography: Claudine Sauvé
- Production companies: Auguste Content; C-Films AG; Fidelio Films
- Distributed by: Elevation Pictures; Ascot Elite Entertainment Group
- Release date: September 16, 2026 (AIFF)
- Countries: Canada; Switzerland
- Language: English

111 Echoes from Halifax is a Canadian-Swiss drama film, directed by Mauro Mueller and released in 2026. The film depicts various characters in the aftermath of the 1998 crash of Swissair Flight 111 just off Peggys Cove.

The film stars Kris Holden-Ried, Natalie Brown and Ursina Lardi, with supporting cast members including Djebril Zonga, Fathia Youssouf, Chris Turner, Rebecca Liddiard, Eric Keenleyside, Anatole Taubman, Martha Irving and Taylor Olson.

The film premiered as the opening gala of the 2026 Atlantic International Film Festival, where it won the Gordon Parsons Award for Best Atlantic Canadian Feature.
