= The Pichenotte =

2026 Canadian short comedy film

- French: La Pichenotte
- Directed by: Antoine Boulanger
- Written by: Antoine Boulanger
- Produced by: Antoine Boulanger
- Starring: Hugo Giroux; Carmen Sylvestre; Michel Courtemanche
- Cinematography: T. Anthony Gharzouzi
- Edited by: James Kelly
- Music by: Philipe Poulin
- Production company: Whisky-Romeo
- Release date: April 22, 2026 (Sherbrooke)
- Running time: 28 minutes
- Country: Canada
- Language: French

The Pichenotte (French: La Pichenotte) is a Canadian short black comedy film, directed by Antoine Boulanger and released in 2026. The film stars Hugo Giroux as Stéphane, a grim reaper whose mission is confounded when he meets Huguette (Carmen Sylvestre), an elderly woman who is ready and willing, yet persistently unable, to die.

The cast also includes Michel Courtemanche and Roger Ouellette in supporting roles.

Made as Boulanger's student project while studying film at Concordia University, the film was inspired in part by his father, who has struggled with his mental health and undertaken more than one suicide attempt. Its title derives from Stéphane making his decisions about life or death with the flick of a finger, as in the game of pichenotte.

It was shot in Saint-Jean-sur-Richelieu in 2024.

The film premiered in April 2026 at the Sherbrooke World Film Festival, and was later screened in the Fantastic Weekends of Quebec Cinema program at the 30th Fantasia International Film Festival.

== Awards ==
Award	Date of ceremony	Category	Nominee(s)	Result	Ref.
Sherbrooke World Film Festival	2026	Prix Pierre-Javaux	Antoine Boulanger	Won	
Sherbrooke World Film Festival	2026	Audience Choice	Antoine Boulanger	Won	
Student Academy Awards	2026	Narrative Films Competition	Antoine Boulanger	silver	
