= Anchor Fest =

Anchor Fest is a multidisciplinary media arts festival in Charlottetown, Prince Edward Island, Canada, with programming devoted to film, television, comedy, music and podcasts.

First launched in 2015 as the Charlottetown Film Festival, the event screened a selection of films annually, with a special but not exclusive focus on films made by filmmakers from Prince Edward Island and the wider Atlantic Canada region.

In 2017, the festival undertook a cultural exchange with the Screenplay Film Festival in Shetland, Scotland, with each festival sending a program of short films by local filmmakers to be screened at the other event.

Jenna MacMillan became the festival's executive director in 2023. She spearheaded the festival's rebranding as Anchor Fest, stating that she had been inspired by her experiences attending SXSW in Austin, Texas. The first event under the rebranded name is slated for October 2026.
