= Frieda Luk =

Frieda Luk is a Canadian film director and screenwriter from Vancouver, British Columbia, whose feature directorial debut Sacred Creatures was released in 2026.

She is a graduate of the University of Toronto and Columbia University. She directed a number of short films in her early career, including American Sisyphus, which premiered at the 2012 Toronto International Film Festival, and The Encounter, which premiered at the 2014 Toronto International Film Festival. She was also co-writer with Jason Mann of the screenplay for Mann's 2012 short film Delicacy.

During the development of Sacred Creatures, Luk received funding from Telefilm Canada's English-language funding program in 2022, and participated in the Inside Out Film and Video Festival's film financing program in 2023. Steve Gravestock also selected Luk as a recipient of the "pay-it-forward" grant when he won the Toronto Film Critics Association's Company 3 TFCA Luminary Award at the Toronto Film Critics Association Awards 2022.

Sacred Creatures premiered at the 2026 Edinburgh International Film Festival.

== Filmography ==
- American Sisyphus - 2012
- The Encounter - 2014
- Sacred Creatures - 2026
