= Permanent Damage (film) =

2026 Canadian thriller film

- Directed by: Seth A. Smith
- Written by: Seth A. Smith; Darcy Spidle
- Produced by: Daniel Bekerman; Nancy Urich
- Starring: Calem MacDonald; Stephen Dorff; Olivia Scriven; Clare Coulter
- Cinematography: Jeff Wheaton
- Edited by: Seth A. Smith
- Music by: Seth A. Smith
- Production companies: Cut/Off/Tail Pictures; Scythia Films
- Distributed by: VVS Films
- Release date: July 21, 2026 (Fantasia)
- Running time: 98 minutes
- Country: Canada
- Language: English

Permanent Damage is a Canadian crime thriller film, directed by Seth A. Smith and released in 2026. The film stars Calem MacDonald as Tommy, a convict who escapes from prison and immediately attempts to steal clothes from a Dollarama, but is saved by the intervention of Mrs. Whynot (Clare Coulter), a senile elderly woman who believes he is her son Donnie. Moving in with her and assuming Donnie's life and identity, he falls in love with her neighbour Joe (Olivia Scriven) and falls afoul of her uncle LL (Stephen Dorff), the house's landlord who wants to evict Mrs. Whynot so he can tear the house down, and finally concocts a drug-dealing scheme to make the money to save the home.

The cast also includes Stephen McHattie, Gabe Meacher, Jonni Shreve, Chik White, Woodrow Graves, Quancetia Hamilton, Eugene Sampang, Trina Corkum, Martina Kelades, Jonathan Fisher, Robert Sparks, KC Spidle, Ron Daniel, Marissa Sean Cruz, Tieren Hawkins and Elizabeth Smith Pelham in supporting roles.

== Distribution ==
The film premiered at the 30th Fantasia International Film Festival, and was screened at the 2026 Atlantic International Film Festival.

== Critical response ==
Clint Worthington of RogerEbert.com likened the film to Harmony Korine directing an episode of Letterkenny, writing that "It doesn’t all quite hold together, and 'Permanent Damage'‘s quirks start to grow a bit stale as the film goes on. But I love the way Smith cares for these working-class characters, even as they shit, piss, and stick themselves to chairs; they’re doing everything they can to cling to what little the world leaves them, and finding what little happiness they can find. Decidedly welcome anti-landlord cinema."

For Screen Anarchy, Kurt Halfyard wrote that "both a wacky drama and a drug-fuelled heist film, Permanent Damage is, simultaneously, effervescently slight and deeply memorable. It is swell to see street trash get the opportunity for a second life."

== Awards ==
At AIFF, Smith won the award for Best Atlantic Original Score.
