= The Snake (film) =

2026 Canadian comedy film

- Directed by: Jenna MacMillan
- Written by: Susan Kent
- Produced by: Sharlene Kelly; Melani Wood
- Starring: Susan Kent; Robin Duke; Jonathan Torrens
- Cinematography: Kevin A. Fraser
- Edited by: Sam Thomson
- Music by: Aaron Comeau
- Production company: Club Red Productions
- Distributed by: Game Theory Films
- Release date: March 13, 2026 (SXSW)
- Running time: 89 minutes
- Country: Canada
- Language: English

The Snake is a Canadian comedy film, directed by Jenna MacMillan and released in 2026. The film stars Susan Kent as Jamie, an "ungovernable" wild woman whose abrasive behaviour leads to upheaval in her personal life after a conflict with her mother Anne (Robin Duke) results in her being evicted from living in her mother's home, and who initiates an affair with her best friend's husband after being dumped by her own boyfriend.

The cast also includes Jonathan Torrens, Dan Petronijevic, Emma Hunter, Kim Roberts, Kenny Robinson, Jacqueline Robbins, Joyce Robbins and Jimbo in supporting roles.

== Distribution ==
The film, MacMillan's directorial debut following several credits as a producer, was shot in 2025 in Charlottetown, Prince Edward Island. The first PEI-shot film ever to premiere at a major international film festival, it premiered on March 13, 2026, at the 2026 South by Southwest Film & TV Festival, and had its Canadian premiere as the Atlantic Gala at the 2026 Atlantic International Film Festival.

It has been acquired for commercial distribution by Game Theory Films.

== Awards ==
At SXSW, Kent won a Special Jury Award for her performance in the film.

At AIFF, MacMillan won the award for Best Atlantic Canadian Director, and Kent won the Joan Orenstein Award for Outstanding Performance in Acting and the Michael Weir Award for Best Atlantic Screenwriting.
