= Olivia Luccardi =

American actress and producer (born 1989)

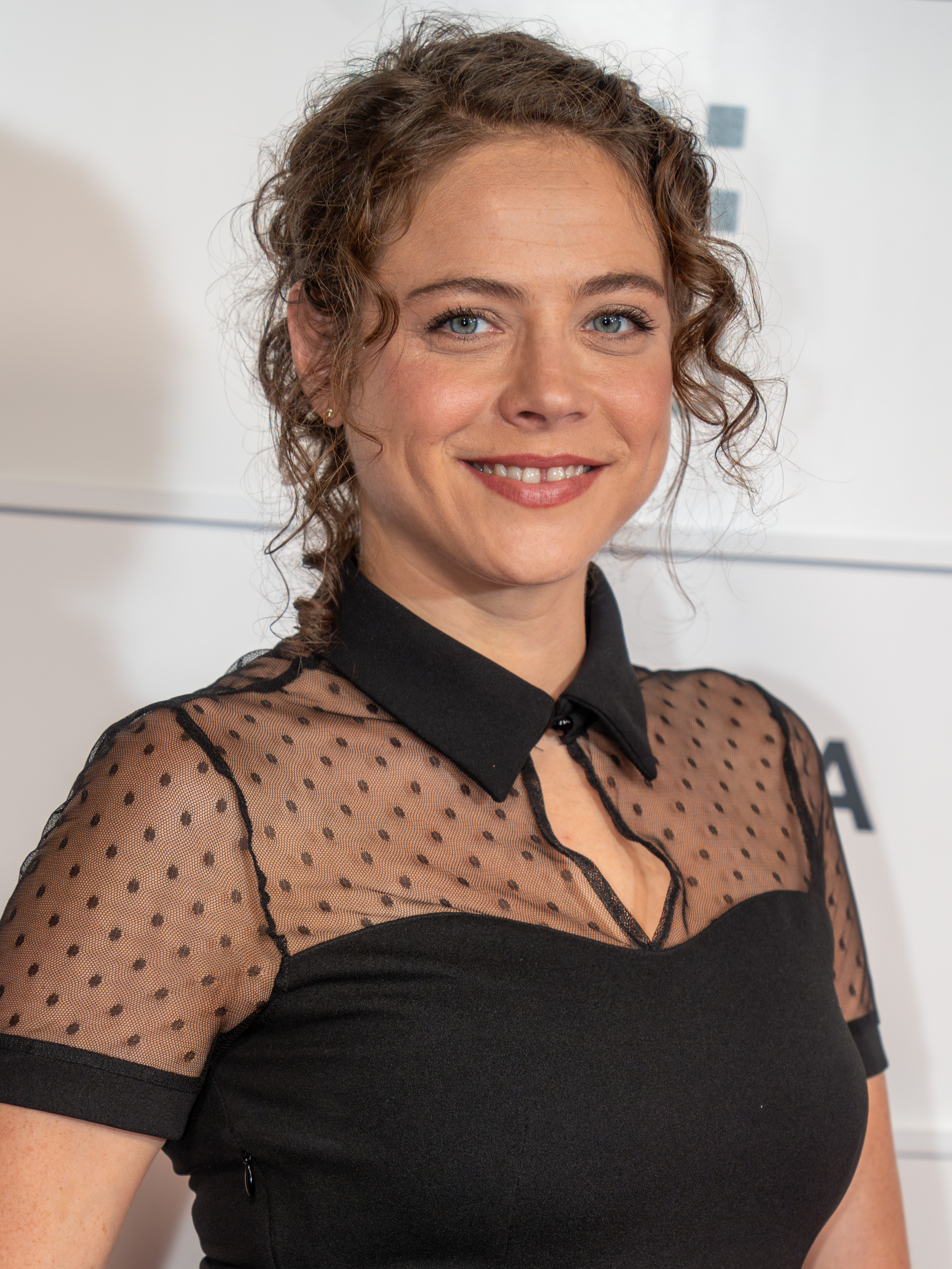
- Luccardi at the 2025 Tribeca Festival
- Born: May 17, 1989 (age 37); Brooklyn, New York, U.S.
- Occupations: Actress, producer
- Years active: 2009–present

Olivia Luccardi (born May 17, 1989) is an American actress and producer. She is known for her roles as Alice Woods in Syfy's horror anthology series Channel Zero: Butcher's Block and as Yara Davis in the supernatural thriller film It Follows.

== Early life ==
Luccardi was born to Patricia (née Bowden), a hair and makeup stylist, and Giuseppe Luccardi, a fashion photographer. Luccardi's childhood was spent in Brooklyn, but she went to high school in Chatham, New York. Luccardi revealed she was bullied throughout school.

== Career ==
After high school, Luccardi moved to Manhattan. Luccardi worked for Webster Hall, formerly a nightclub, and its Quarterly Art Soiree, for four years until March 2013.

In Girls, she "played a foulmouthed little Staten Island mall rat".

Luccardi's other notable roles include the American thriller film Money Monster, the drama film Person to Person, Netflix's comedy-drama series Orange Is the New Black, and HBO's period drama series The Deuce.

== Personal life ==
Luccardi moved from New York to Los Angeles in September 2018.

== Filmography ==
=== Film ===
Year	Title	Role	Notes
2009	Bleeding	6 Girls	Short film
2011	Sailor Moon the Movie	Luna	Voice role; short film
2014	It Follows	Yara Davis	
2014	The Rewrite	Chloe	
2014	Like Sunday, Like Rain	Shelly	
2016	Lady Like	Luce	
2016	Money Monster	Arlene	
2017	Person to Person	Melanie	
2017	Feral	Jules	
2017	Ironwood	Mika	
2017	One Percent More Humid	Mae	
2018	After Everything	Janelle	
2018	Losing Track	Bri Morris	Short film; also producer
2019	Drunk Parents	Jessie	
2019	Kill the Boyfriend	Viola	Short film
2019	Treasure Trouble	Eve	
2019	Diamond Soles	Liv	
2020	Go/Don't Go	"K"	also producer
2020	Viena and the Fantomes	Rebecca	
2020	Paint	Kelsey Frick	
2020	Kappa Kappa Die	Maxine	
2021	Shoplifters of the World	Sandi	
2022	Soft & Quiet	Leslie	
2022	Candy Land	Remy	
2025	The Baltimorons	Brittany	
2026	Sacred Creatures	Miriam	
2026	Lucy Schulman		
2026	Rolling Loud	Brittany	

=== Television ===
Year	Title	Role	Notes
2013	Girls	Staten Island Girl	Episode: "Boys"
2013	Secret Lives of Husbands and Wives	India	Television film
2014–2017	Orange Is the New Black	Jennifer Digori	Guest role (season 2), recurring role (seasons 4-5); 17 episodes
2015	House of Cards	Escort	Episode: "Chapter 27"
2015	The Jim Gaffigan Show	Deni	Episode: "Go Shorty, It's Your Birthday"
2017–2019	The Deuce	Margaret Rouse / Melissa	Recurring role (seasons 1 and 2), Main role (season 3); 22 episodes
2018	Paint	Kelsey	Television film
2018	Channel Zero: Butcher's Block	Alice Woods	Main role; 6 episodes
2018	The Bold Type	Gina	Episode: "Betsy"
2022	The Thing About Pam	Lily Day	Main cast, 6 episodes
2022–2023	East New York	Officer Brandy Quinlan	Main cast, 21 episodes
