= Shailene Garnett =

Canadian actress (active 2012-)

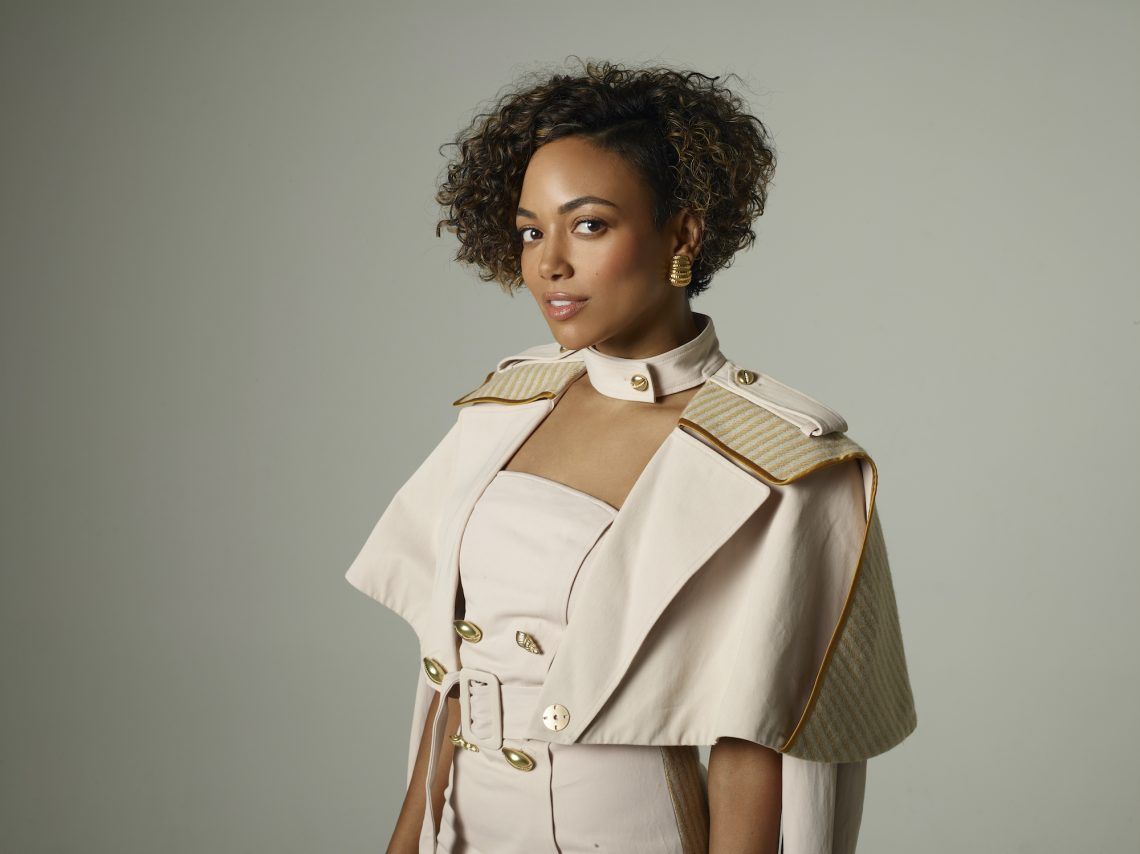
- Garnett in 2022
- Born: Shailene Garnett; Montreal, Quebec, Canada
- Occupations: Actress; filmmaker
- Years active: 2012–present

Shailene Garnett is a Canadian actress and filmmaker. She is known for starring in a variety of television series, including the CBC Television series Diggstown (2019–2022) and Murdoch Mysteries (2018–present), the Freeform series Shadowhunters (2016), and the Netflix series Between (2015).

Throughout her career, Garnett has also appeared in the feature films The Dirties and Best Man Holiday (both 2013), and the web series Out with Dad (2011–2012) and Teenagers (2015–2017).

== Early life ==
Born and raised in Montreal, Quebec, Garnett worked in an elementary school as a teacher's assistant prior to beginning her career as an actress in Toronto.

== Career ==
Garnett began acting in the early 2010s when she moved to Toronto, with supporting and guest roles in various short films, web series, and television productions. In an interview, she said that the Olsen twins inspired her to pursue acting from a young age.

In 2013, Garnett portrayed Krissy B. in Matt Johnson's film The Dirties; this marked her first feature film role. That year, Garnett also appeared in the comedy drama film Best Man Holiday.

In 2015, she achieved wider recognition with her role in the Netflix series Between, in which she played Ms. Symonds. The following the year, she played Maureen for one season of the Freeform series Shadowhunters. From 2015 to 2017, she portrayed Adele on the Canadian web series Teenagers.

Garnett wrote, directed, produced, and starred in a short film titled 77 Days, which screened at several film festivals throughout 2017, including the Reelworld Film Festival. In an interview, Garnett said the film was inspired by a family member's struggle with addiction.

Since 2018, she has played the recurring role of Nomi Johnston on the long-running CBC Television series Murdoch Mysteries.

From 2019 to 2022, Garnett has portrayed Iris Beals in Diggstown.

== Filmography ==
Year	Title	Role	Notes
2011	Dual Suspects	Kitabel Jones	Episode: "Date with Death"
2011–2012	Out with Dad	Alicia's Friend	Web series; 4 episodes
2012	The L.A. Complex	Reader	Episode: "The Contract"
2012	Warehouse 13	Half-Dressed Woman	Episode: "Personal Effects"
2012	Beauty and the Beast	Keri	Episode: “Out of Control”
2013	The Dirties	Krissy B.	Film
2013	The Listener	Catrin	Episode: "Buckle Up"
2013	Best Man Holiday	Jordan's Assistant	Film
2014	The Strain	Sebastiane	Episode: "For Services Rendered"
2014	Covert Affairs	Joan's Assistant	Recurring; 2 episodes
2015	Single Ladies	Bronwyn	Recurring; 2 episodes
2015	Between	Ms. Symonds	Recurring; 4 episodes
2015–2017	Teenagers	Adele	Web series; 14 episodes
2016	Shadowhunters	Maureen Brown	Recurring; 5 episodes
2016	77 Days	Shay	Also director, writer, producer
2018	Tom Clancy's Jack Ryan	Teresa Lowe/Teresa Kang	Recurring; 4 episodes
2018–present	Murdoch Mysteries	Nomi Johnston	Recurring; 8 episodes
2019	Hudson & Rex	Nancy Rubic	Episode: "Haunted by the Past"
2019	Good Witch	Natalie	Episode: "The Treasure"
2019–2022	Diggstown	Iris Beals	Main role; 12 episodes
2025	Welcome	Sasha Bird	Film
2025–2026	Fire Country	Eleanor Davis	Recurring; 5 episodes
2026	Unholy Night	Rene	
