= Ursina Lardi =

Swiss actress

- Born: 19 December 1970 (age 55); Samedan

Ursina Lardi (born 19 December 1970 in Samedan) is a Swiss actress, best known for playing the baroness, Marie-Louise in The White Ribbon. Lardi studied acting at the Academy of Performing Arts Ernst Busch in Berlin and played at various theatres in Germany, and movies, among them Akte Grüninger (2013) and Marmorera (2007).

== Selected filmography ==
- Passing Summer — 2001
- Fortress — 2011
- The Woman from the Past — 2013, TV film
- Sag mir nichts — 2016, TV film
- Shock Waves – First Name: Mathieu — 2018
- Prelude — 2019
- The Girl and the Spider — 2021
- Continental Drift (South) (La dérive des continents (au sud)) — 2022
- Orphea in Love — 2022
- Die Nachbarn von oben — 2023
- Peripheric Love — 2023
- 111 Echoes from Halifax — 2026

== Recognition and awards ==
In 2025, Lardi was appointed as a member of the jury at the 78th Locarno Film Festival for Concorso Internazionale – Main Competition.
