= The Banquet (2026 film) =

- Directed by: Gloria Ui Young Kim
- Written by: Gloria Ui Young Kim
- Produced by: Sonya Di Rienzo; Aeschylus Poulos
- Starring: Vicki Kim; Park Hye-jin; Austin Ball
- Cinematography: Dmitry Lopatin
- Edited by: Lee Walker
- Music by: Stephen Krecklo
- Production company: Hawkeye Pictures
- Release date: September 19, 2026 (AIFF)
- Running time: 105 minutes
- Country: Canada
- Languages: English; Korean

The Banquet is a Canadian comedy-drama film, directed by Gloria Ui Young Kim and released in 2026. The film stars Vicki Kim as Sunny, a burned-out advertising executive who is challenged by her mother Young-ja (Park Hye-jin) to take over the family's annual Chuseok dinner, despite barely knowing how to cook any of her mother's traditional recipes, shortly after discovering that her business and personal partner Dean (Austin Ball) is cheating on her.

The cast also includes Erniel Baez, Joy Lho, Yoseph Chang, Georgette Lee, Pamela Estrada, Soo-Ram Kim, Chang-Woon Kim, Mark Lutz, Konstantina Mantelos and Nicole Stamp in supporting roles.

== Production ==
The film was in development as early as 2008, with her initial screenplay treatment selected as a finalist in Telefilm Canada's Pitch This! competition at the 2009 Toronto International Film Festival.

Despite this, Kim concentrated on her work in television directing over the next number of years, and made her feature directorial debut with Queen of the Morning Calm in 2019, before proceeding with The Banquet after it received a production grant from Telefilm in 2023.

== Release ==
The film premiered on September 19, 2026, at the 2026 Atlantic International Film Festival, followed by a screening at the 2026 Cinéfest Sudbury International Film Festival on September 25.
