= Best Boy (2025 film) =

2025 Canadian thriller film

- Directed by: Jesse Noah Klein
- Written by: Jesse Noah Klein
- Produced by: Chantal Chamandy; Laurel Parmet; Michael Solomon; Jesse Noah Klein
- Starring: Aaron Abrams; Caroline Dhavernas; Marc Bendavid; Lise Roy
- Cinematography: Nicolas Canniccioni
- Edited by: Yvann Thibaudeau
- Production company: Chasseurs Films
- Distributed by: La Distributrice de Films; Vortex Media
- Release date: August 16, 2025 (Edinburgh)
- Running time: 91 minutes
- Country: Canada
- Languages: English; French

Best Boy is a Canadian black comedy thriller film, directed by Jesse Noah Klein and released in 2025.

The film stars Aaron Abrams, Caroline Dhavernas and Marc Bendavid as Lawrence, Philip and Eli, three adult siblings gathering at the family summer home after the death of their father. An emotionally abusive man who was so obsessed with competitive masculinity that even his daughter was given a masculine name and raised to behave like a boy rather than a girl, he has left instructions that they must compete in a final physical endurance contest, under the supervision of their mother (Lise Roy), to determine who will inherit $100,000.

== Production ==
The film received production funding from Telefilm Canada in 2022, and from the Société de développement des entreprises culturelles in 2024.

The film was shot entirely on location at a country home in the Eastern Townships region of Quebec, which Klein described as having an appropriately foreboding presence that suited the film's themes of aggressive and toxic family dynamics.

== Distribution ==
The film premiered on August 16, 2025, in the Sean Connery Prize competition at the Edinburgh International Film Festival, and had its Canadian premiere at the 2025 Cinéfest Sudbury International Film Festival.

== Critical response ==
Robert Daniels of Screen Daily wrote that "the film’s intensity is further ratcheted by its keen aesthetic. The wide, at times, fish-eyed lensing neatly mirrors the strain at the heart of this family. Klein also leans on high-angle shots. Though there are no spectres here per se, the oblique angle does act as a personification of their father. Interestingly, the warped verticality of these shots is less like the benevolent omniscience you would receive from a beloved spirit, and more like surveillance footage. That choice suggests a metaphorical translation of the poisonous air this father has left around his family."
