= Serville Poblete =

Canadian screenwriter and film director

Serville Poblete is a Canadian screenwriter and film director from Toronto, whose debut feature film Altar Boy premiered in the Borsos Competition program at the 2021 Whistler Film Festival.

Of Filipino descent, Poblete grew up in the St. James Town neighbourhood of Toronto, and studied media production at George Brown College. He released his first short film, Lovebound, in 2018, before beginning work on Altar Boy, which starred his childhood friend Mark Bacolcol.

His second feature film, Lovely, premiered at the 2024 Reelworld Film Festival, and was longlisted for the 2024 Jean-Marc Vallée DGC Discovery Award.

His 2025 short documentary film King's Court premiered at the 2025 Hot Docs Canadian International Documentary Festival, and received a Canadian Screen Award nomination for Best Short Documentary at the 14th Canadian Screen Awards in 2026.

His 2026 short documentary film In the Morning Sun premiered in the documentary shorts competition at the 2026 South by Southwest Film & TV Festival, where it won the Jury Award.

His third feature film, Sunburn, premiered in the Centrepiece program at the 2026 Toronto International Film Festival, where it won the award for Best Canadian Film.

== Filmography ==
- Lovebound - 2018
- Altar Boy - 2021
- Lovely - 2024
- King's Court - 2025
- In the Morning Sun - 2026
- Sunburn - 2026
