= In the Morning Sun =

- Directed by: Serville Poblete
- Written by: Serville Poblete
- Produced by: Nicole Dane; Serville Poblete
- Cinematography: Serville Poblete
- Edited by: Serville Poblete
- Music by: Estyr
- Production company: Serve Films
- Release date: February 2026 (SXSW)
- Running time: 21 minutes
- Country: Canada
- Language: English

In the Morning Sun is a Canadian short documentary film, directed by Serville Poblete and released in 2026. The film profiles his mother, Lydia, as she reminisces about her life in the Philippines prior to emigrating to Canada, through both regular conversations with her family and using her Amazon Alexa to listen to Filipino music and keep track of news and weather updates from her hometown.

Poblete noted that the film's scene in which his father casually starts whistling inspired him to write a similar scene into his narrative feature screenplay Sunburn.

The film premiered in the documentary shorts competition at the 2026 South by Southwest Film & TV Festival, where it won the Jury Award. It subsequently had its Canadian premiere at the 2026 Hot Docs Canadian International Documentary Festival.
