= Salvatore Antonio =

Canadian actor and playwright

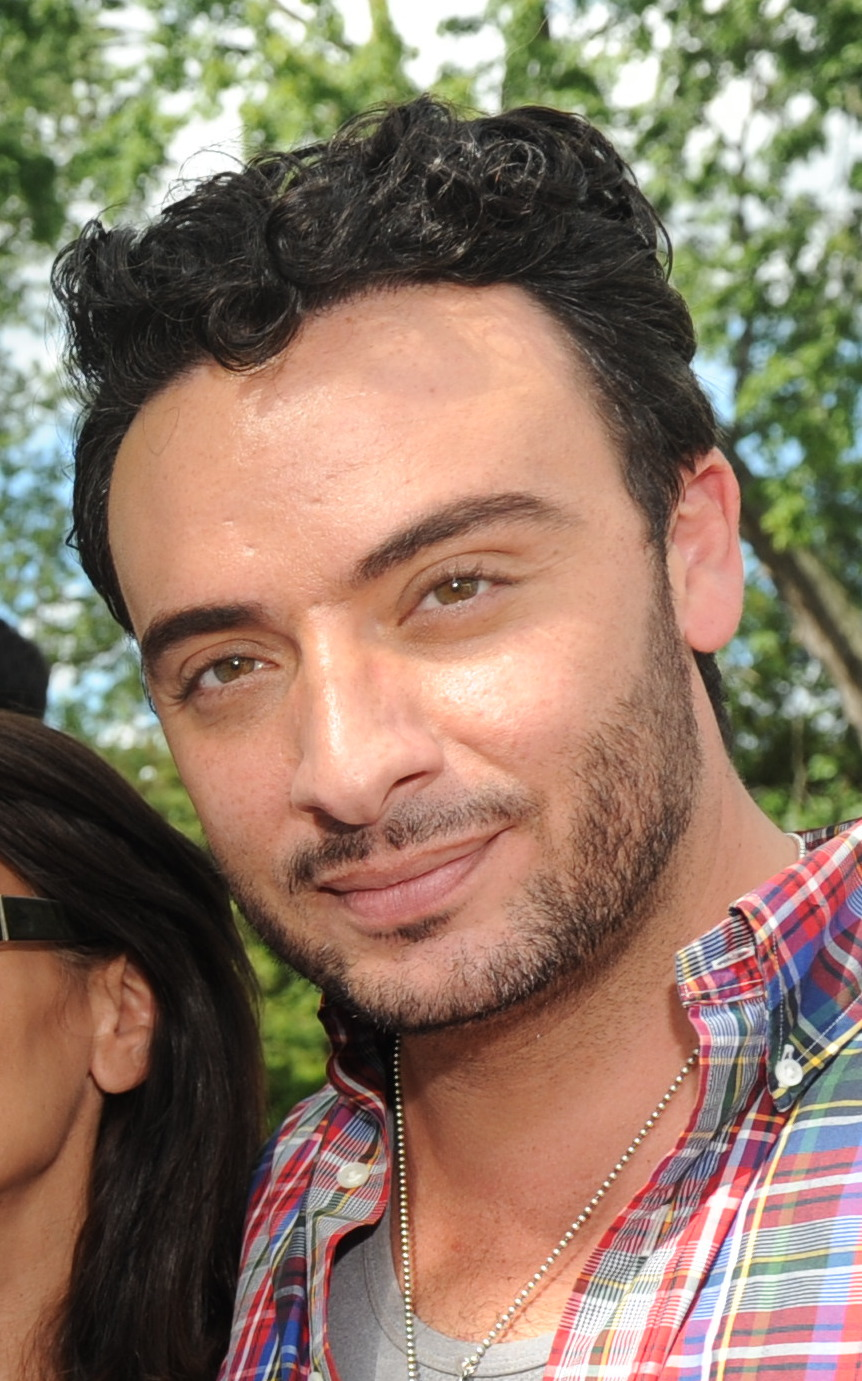
- Salvatore Antonio, September 2012
- Education: National Theatre School of Canada
- Occupations: Actor, playwright

Salvatore Antonio is a Canadian actor and playwright.

== Early life ==
He was born Salvatore Antonio Alessandro Migliore in Toronto, Ontario.

He attended an enriched Arts programme at Unionville High School, and upon graduating he was one of 10 students accepted into the National Theatre School of Canada, where he became an instructor several years after graduating, graduating in 1998.

== Actor ==
Antonio is known for playing the lead character, Sacha Martinelli, in the television series Paradise Falls for Showcase and here!.

On stage, he originated the title-role in 'Botticelli In the Fire' written by Governor General's Award winner Jordan Tannahill. He also played the title character in Léo by Rosa Labordé at the Tarragon Theatre during the winter of 2006. He reprised the role in 2007, and toured Canada with the production in winter 2008. He played one of the lead roles in the psychological thriller Sam's Lake. Other recent films include Cursing Hanley, The Gospel of John, and Looking for Angelina.

As of June 7, 2012, he can be seen on the new supernatural medical drama Saving Hope as Victor Reis. In 2014, he appeared in the sitcom 24 Hour Rental.

== Playwright ==
As a playwright, Antonio was named a finalist for the 2007 Governor General's Award for English drama, for his debut work In Gabriel's Kitchen. The play was originally produced at Buddies in Bad Times Theatre in March 2006, where it proved a box-office success. The play went on to be translated into Italian, and was performed in October 2006, at Teatro Della Limonaia, in Florence, Italy. The script was published in May 2007, by Playwrights Canada Press.

In 2013, Antonio presented Truth/Dare: A Satire (With Dance), an interactive audience participation show which featured staged reenactments of scenes from Madonna's 1991 film Truth or Dare, at Buddies in Bad Times during Toronto's Pride Week. The show's cast also included Adamo Ruggiero, Gavin Crawford and Keith Cole.
