= Jeffrey's Turn =

2026 Canadian drama film

- Directed by: Glen Gould
- Written by: Glen Gould; Joe LeClair
- Produced by: Richard MacQueen; Hank White; Marty Williams
- Starring: Zeegwon Shilling; Glen Gould; Grace Dove
- Cinematography: Charlie Benoit
- Edited by: Angela Baker
- Music by: Mark Dolmont
- Production companies: Stone Cold Productions; Yellow Lantern Productions; MacQueen Productions
- Distributed by: Indiecan Entertainment
- Release date: September 19, 2026 (AIFF)
- Running time: 120 minutes
- Country: Canada
- Language: English

Jeffrey's Turn is a Canadian drama film, directed by Glen Gould and released in 2026. The film stars Gould as Arty, an Indigenous Canadian man who calls on his nephew JR (Zeegwon Shilling) to come pick him up in Maine after he is released from jail, with the two men embarking on a road trip that serves as a coming-of-age for JR.

The cast also includes Grace Dove, Brandon Oakes, Sidney Francis, Christian Dalton, Sean Skerry, Pamela Matthews and Desna Michael Thomas in supporting roles.

The film, Gould's directorial debut, was based in part on his own relationship with his uncle, Donald Marshall Jr..

The film premiered at the 2026 Atlantic International Film Festival, where Gould won the David Renton Award for Outstanding Performance in Acting.
