= Susan Kent (actress) =

Canadian actress (born 1974)

- Born: December 12, 1974 (age 51); St. John's, Newfoundland and Labrador, Canada
- Education: Memorial University of Newfoundland
- Occupations: Actress, comedy writer
- Years active: 2000–present

Susan Kent (born December 12, 1974) is a Canadian actress. She is best known for her work as a cast member of CBC Television's This Hour Has 22 Minutes since joining in 2012. Kent had previously been a writer for, and an occasional performer on the program. She is also known for her portrayal of Susan (the foul-mouthed hockey mom) in Trailer Park Boys since Season 11 (2017). She is currently starring in The Trades, By Trailer Park Boys and Kontent House. Going on its third year, she appears in every subsequent season so far.

== Early life and education ==
Kent was born in St. John's, Newfoundland and Labrador, though she was primarily raised in Corner Brook. She studied theatre arts at the Grenfell Campus of Memorial University of Newfoundland. She was classmates with the filmmakers Sherry White and Adriana Maggs, and comedian Jonny Harris.

== Career ==
Kent also previously appeared in the television series Pretty Hard Cases, Hatching, Matching and Dispatching, Three Chords from the Truth and The Kids in the Hall: Death Comes to Town. Kent's film credits include Young Triffie, Diverted, A Christmas Fury, Hopeless Romantic, Relative Happiness, How to Be Deadly, Making Love in St. Pierre, Grown Up Movie Star, Spinster and Who's Yer Father?.

Kent is a member of the sketch comedy group Dance Party of Newfoundland. She has also acted on stage in St. John's, with Rising Tide Theatre in Trinity, and with Resource Centre for the Arts Theatre, including performances in Sara Tilley's The (In)complete Herstory of Women in Newfoundland (and Labrador!) and her own one-woman show, Nan Loves Jerry.

In 2024 she received a Canadian Screen Award nomination for Best Lead Performance in a Comedy Film at the 12th Canadian Screen Awards, for her role in the film Who's Yer Father?. At the 2026 Atlantic International Film Festival, she won both the Joan Orenstein Award for Outstanding Performance in Acting and the Michael Weir Award for Best Atlantic Screenwriting, for The Snake.

== Filmography ==
=== Film ===
Year	Title	Role	Notes
2000	Violet	Romona	
2004	Making Love in St. Pierre	Marjie	
2006	Young Triffie	Mrs. Head	
2009	Grown Up Movie Star	Jennifer	
2014	Relative Happiness	Susie	
2014	How to Be Deadly	Debbie Stokes	
2019	Spinster	Amanda	
2021	Hands That Bind	Susan Hollis	
2023	Who's Yer Father?	Rhonda Perry	
2026	The Snake	Jamie	Also writer

=== Television ===
Year	Title	Role	Notes
2005–2006	Hatching, Matching and Dispatching	Darkene Furey	6 episodes
2006	Heyday!	Fiona Sullivan	Television film
2007	ReGenesis	Young Mother	Episode: "Back to the Future"
2008	Gossip	Tiffany	Television film
2009	Three Chords from the Truth	Donna Daniels	3 episodes
2009	Diverted	Dori	Television film
2010	The Kids in the Hall: Death Comes to Town	Female Cop	2 episodes
2011	Republic of Doyle	Carlie	Episode: "Something Old, Someone New"
2016	Mr. D	Candace Wilkes	Episode: "Hell-icopter Mom"
2017	A Christmas Fury	Darlene	Television film
2017–2018	Trailer Park Boys	Susan / Woman	6 episodes
2018–2019	Little Dog	Scary Shane Babstock	3 episodes
2019	Trailer Park Boys: The Animated Series	Susan / Trixie	3 episodes
2021	Diggstown	Elidh McCaskill	Episode: "Nina Francis"
2021–2023	Pretty Hard Cases	Layna Sullivan	9 episodes
2023	Hudson & Rex	Fiona Anders	Episode: "Lost and Found"
2024–present	The Trades	Steph	
