= The Last Whale Singer =

2026 German animated film

- German theatrical release poster
- Directed by: Reza Memari
- Screenplay by: Reza Memari
- Produced by: Maite Woköck
- Cinematography: Jaromir Maly
- Edited by: Dieter Riepenhauser
- Music by: Daníel Bjarnason
- Production companies: Telescope Animation; PFX; La Boîte à Fanny
- Distributed by: Little Dream Pictures (Germany)
- Release dates: September 28, 2025 (Schlingel); February 12, 2026 (Germany); June 5, 2026 (United States)
- Running time: 91 minutes
- Countries: Germany; Czech Republic; Canada
- Language: English

The Last Whale Singer is a 2025 animated fantasy film written and directed by Reza Memari. The film follows Vincent, an orphaned humpack whale who is the son of the legendary last Whale Singer. It premiered at Schlingel International Filmfestival in Chemnitz, Germany, on September 28, 2025.

== Plot ==
Vincent, a teenage humpback whale, the orphaned son of Humphrey, the last Whale Singer, whose magical song once protected the oceans. Burdened by the loss of his parents, Vincent doubts his own abilities. When the monstrous Leviathan escapes from a melting iceberg, threatening all marine life with its deadly ink, Vincent must go on an adventurous journey to find his own song to save the oceans, joined by Walter, his finicky suckerfish nanny, and Darya, a brave deaf orca.

== Voice cast ==
- Vincent Tong as Vincent
- Bruce Dinsmore as Walter
- Jenna Wheeler-Hughes as Darya
- Chimwemwe Miller as Humphrey
- Jessica Kardos as Izzy
- Priyanka as Ora
- Jen Viens as Bolt
- Matthew Kabwe as Y

== Production ==
Writer-director Reza Memari had the initial idea for the film while watching a documentary about humpback whales and that they have actual singers in their tribe. After several years of marine research and story development, Memari pitched the film to producer Maite Woköck with whom he had already worked on his first film Richard the Stork.

The film's characters are based on designs by Uwe Heidschötter, known for his work on Revolting Rhymes and Missing Link.

Preproduction started in 2020 with the first beat boards. The movie went into full production in 2023. It was animated in Maya and rendered in Unreal Engine (about 75%) and Houdini (25%). By using Epic Games' Unreal Engine it was possible to render scenes in real time. Epic Games supported the production with two Epic MegaGrants. One reason for this unusual approach was to make the film part of a multi-platform project with a planned prequel video game, an episodic series and further AR/VR projects which will all use the same assets.

Icelandic singer-songwriter Ásgeir wrote and performed the Whale Singer's songs.

== Marketing ==
The first theatrical trailer has been released on September 5, 2025.

== Release ==
The Last Whale Singer premiered at Schlingel International Film Festival in Chemnitz, Germany, on September 28, 2025. It had its international premiere outside Germany at Zurich Film Festival on October 1, 2025. It has also been shown at Filmfest Hamburg, Tauron Young Horizons Film Festival in Warsaw and Lübeck Nordic Film Days. It premiered in the US at the 42nd KidFilm Family Festival in Dallas on January 18th 2026, and has also been shown at the Blue Water Film Festival in San Diego and the DC Environmental Film Festival.

Sales agency Global Screen acquired global distribution rights in 2022 and sold the film to distributors in France and French speaking territories (KMBO), Australia (Icon Film Distribution), Portugal (PRIS Audiovisuais), Greece (Rosebud21) and Germany (Little Dreams). US distribution rights were acquired by Viva Pictures.

The Last Whale Singer has been released in Germany, Austria and Switzerland on February 12, 2026 by Little Dream Pictures. It has been released in Czech Republic and Slovakia on February 19, in Turkey on March 13, in Ukraine and Portugal on March 19, and in Hungary and Romania on April 30. It had a limited release in the US on June 5th, and will be released in Australia and New Zealand on September 24, and in Spain on October 9, 2026.

== Reception ==
In a festival review for German trade magazine Blickpunkt Film, Heike Angermaier wrote that the film "is not only about family reunification, self-belief, and friendship, but also about raising awareness among children about environmental destruction and nature conservation. And it does so not in a didactic way, but in a very charming manner, both narratively and visually." She also found "original ideas, comedy of all shades [...] and touching drama".

Reinhard Kleber of Kino-Zeit criticized the final showdown, "which [...] miraculously brings about a sentimental solution", but elaborates that "despite these weaknesses, The Last Whale Singer is a visually stunning adventure film that inspires courage, celebrates values such as friendship and team spirit, and unobtrusively advocates for the protection of the oceans."

Common Sense Media's Tara McNamara found that "the plot of this whale tale doesn't exactly chart new waters, but its lush, vibrant animation and fascinating facts about ocean creatures will keep kids hooked."

=== Accolades ===
The film won the "Club of Festivals Award", chosen by a jury of 36 children's festival directors and programmers from around the world, in the category "Children" at Schlingel International Film Festival.

It won the Grand Jury Award for "Best Animated Feature Film" at the 7th Annual Blue Water Film Festival.

Reza Memari won the "Director of the Year" award for The Last Whaler Singer at the 2026 Cartoon Tributes during the Cartoon Movie industry forum in Bordeaux, France.

== Other Media ==
In December 2024, Telescope Games, a subsidiary of Telescope Animation, released Lani's Call, a short narrative game for Windows computers, that takes place in the world of The Last Whale Singer.

Coinciding with the release of the film, an interactive story book for smartphones and tablets has been released in February 2026.

== Sequel ==
As of summer 2026, writer-director Memari is working on the screenplay for a sequel.
