= St. James Town =

Coordinates: 43°40′9″N 79°22′22″W

- Neighbourhood
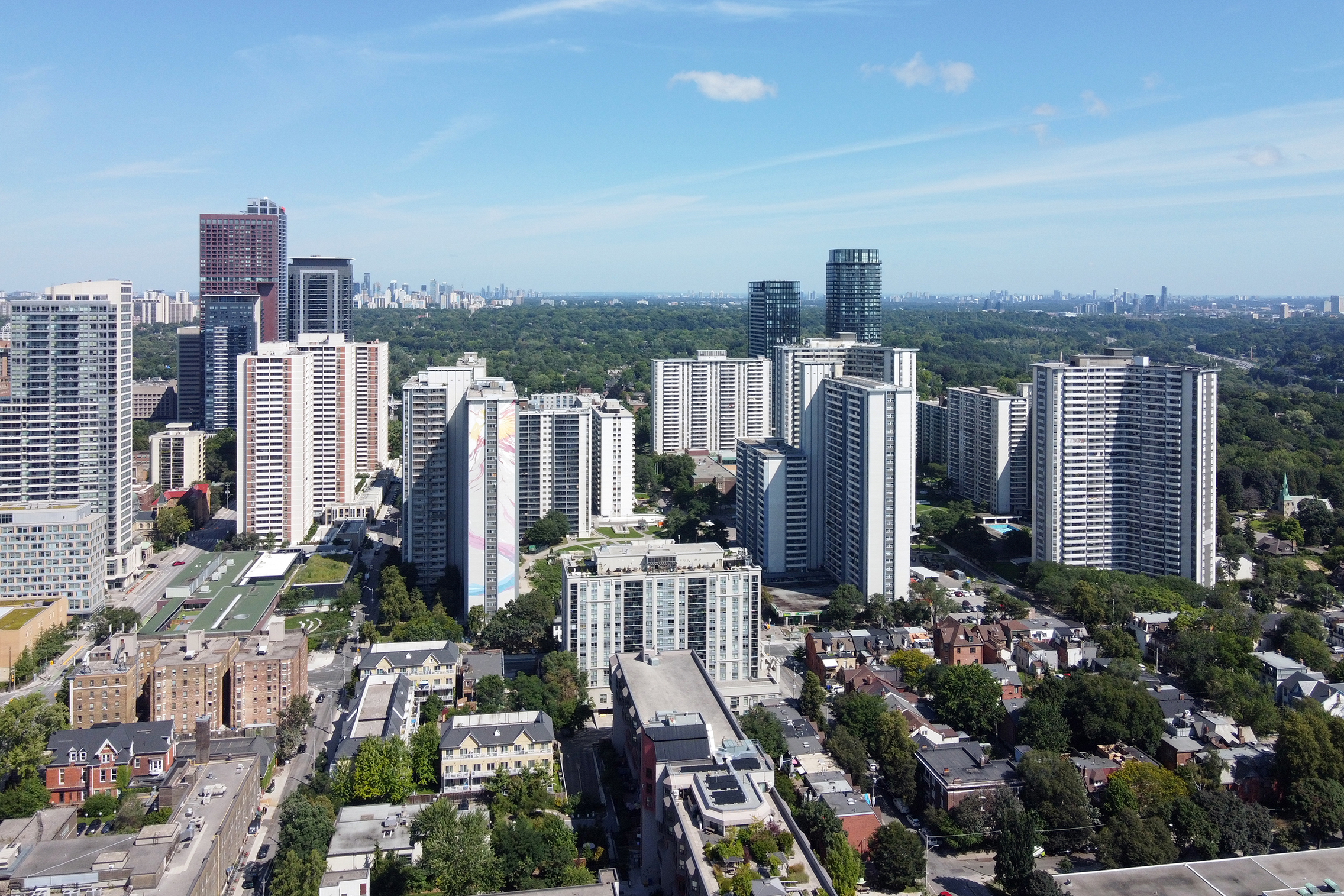
- Aerial view of St. James Town highrises in 2023

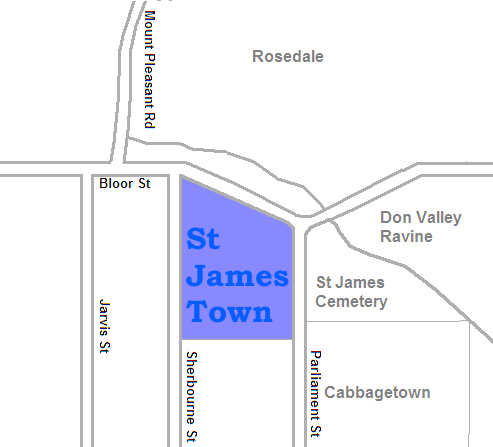
- Country: Canada
- Province: Ontario
- City: Toronto

Government
  - Type: Ward 13 of Toronto City Council
  - City councillor: Chris Moise

St. James Town (sometimes misspelled St. Jamestown) is a neighbourhood of Toronto, Ontario, Canada. It lies in the northeast corner of the downtown area. The neighbourhood covers the area bounded by Jarvis Street to the west, Bloor Street East to the north, Parliament Street to the east, and Wellesley Street East to the south.

St. James Town is the largest high-rise community in Canada. It has been identified as one of 13 economically deprived neighbourhoods within the city. It consists of 19 high-rise buildings (14 to 32 stories). These residential towers were built in the 1960s. Officially, approximately 17,000 people live in the neighbourhood's 19 apartment towers and 4 low rise buildings, making it one of Canada's most densely populated communities.

== History ==
St. James Town began to grow in the 19th century when it became a semi-suburban area home to the city's middle class. It was also part of the City Liberties bounded roughly by Bloor, Don River, Dundas and Bathurst.

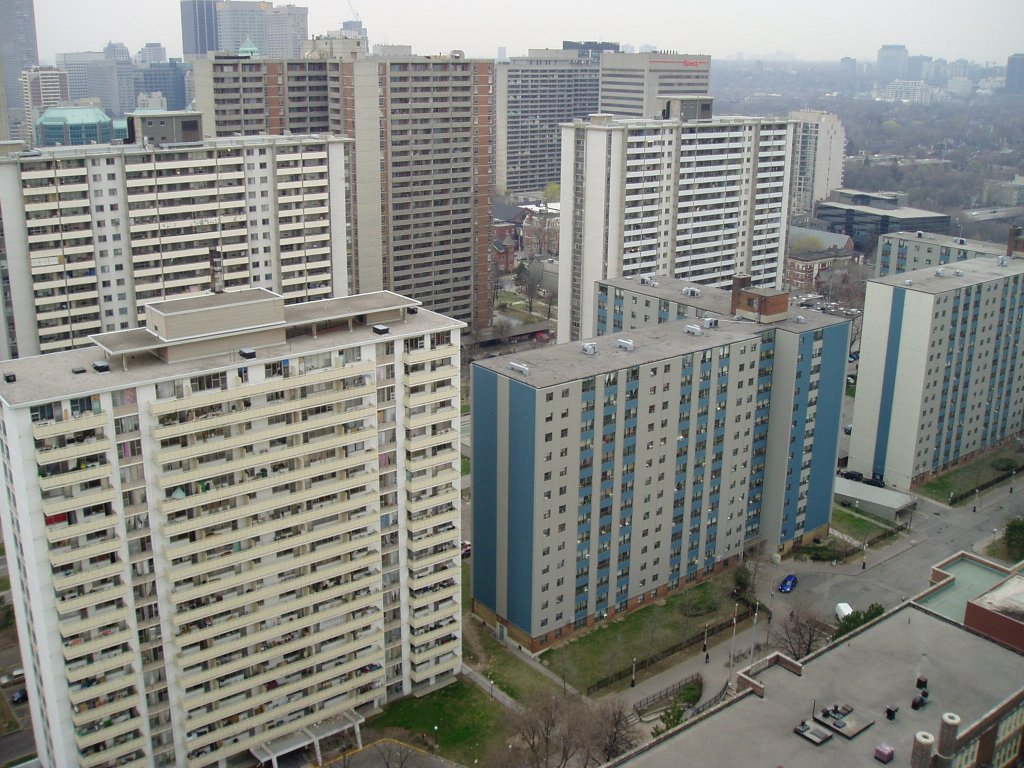
Many of St. James Town's highrises were originally designed after the Second World War, inspired by Le Corbusier's towers in the park concept.

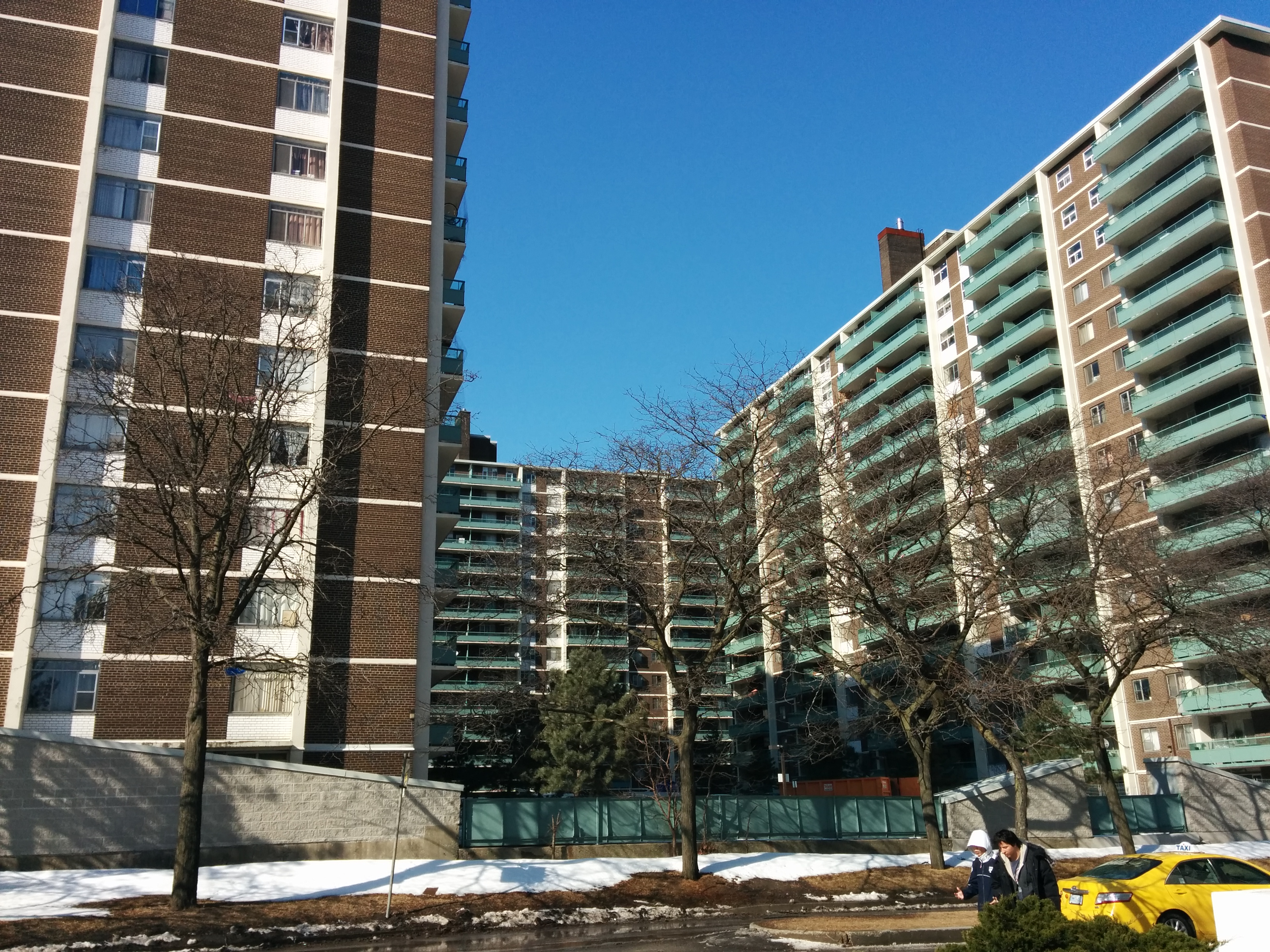
View of St. James Town highrises from street level

St. James Ward was rezoned in the 1950s, and the nineteenth century homes were leveled, and apartment towers — inspired by Le Corbusier's Towers in the Park concept — were erected. Each tower was named after a major Canadian city with some accommodating over 1000 residents. The 14 story Quebec was completed in 1959, the 18 story Victoria in 1965, and The Toronto's 24 floors in 1967. In the same census time period (1961 - 1971) St. James Town's population grew to 11,462 from only 862.

In the late 1960s, the developers attempted to acquire land south of Wellesley, as far as Carlton Street, to expand the St. James Town development. Many residents of the area resisted, with the support of civic activist and future Mayor of Toronto John Sewell. The St. James Town expansion was cancelled, and the homes that had been demolished were replaced with several housing cooperatives.

The plan for St. James Town's highrises was conceived in the 1950s to house young middle class residents who worked downtown. It was spurred forward by the federal government, which saw city building as a key to the nation's recovery after the Depression and the Second World War. The buildings failed to attract the large number of demographics the developer envisioned, and the neighbourhood was designed without proper amenities to support the spike in density. Parallel to the development of St. James Town were large suburban developments of detached family homes in the Toronto suburbs. Many prospective tenants chose suburban houses in the developing areas of Scarborough, Etobicoke, and North York. After the first generation of tenants left the buildings, the area quickly started attracting tenants of a lower income bracket. Four buildings were later built by the province to provide public housing. The towers are now mostly home to newly arrived immigrant families, with only 33% being born in Canada, according to the 2011 Census.

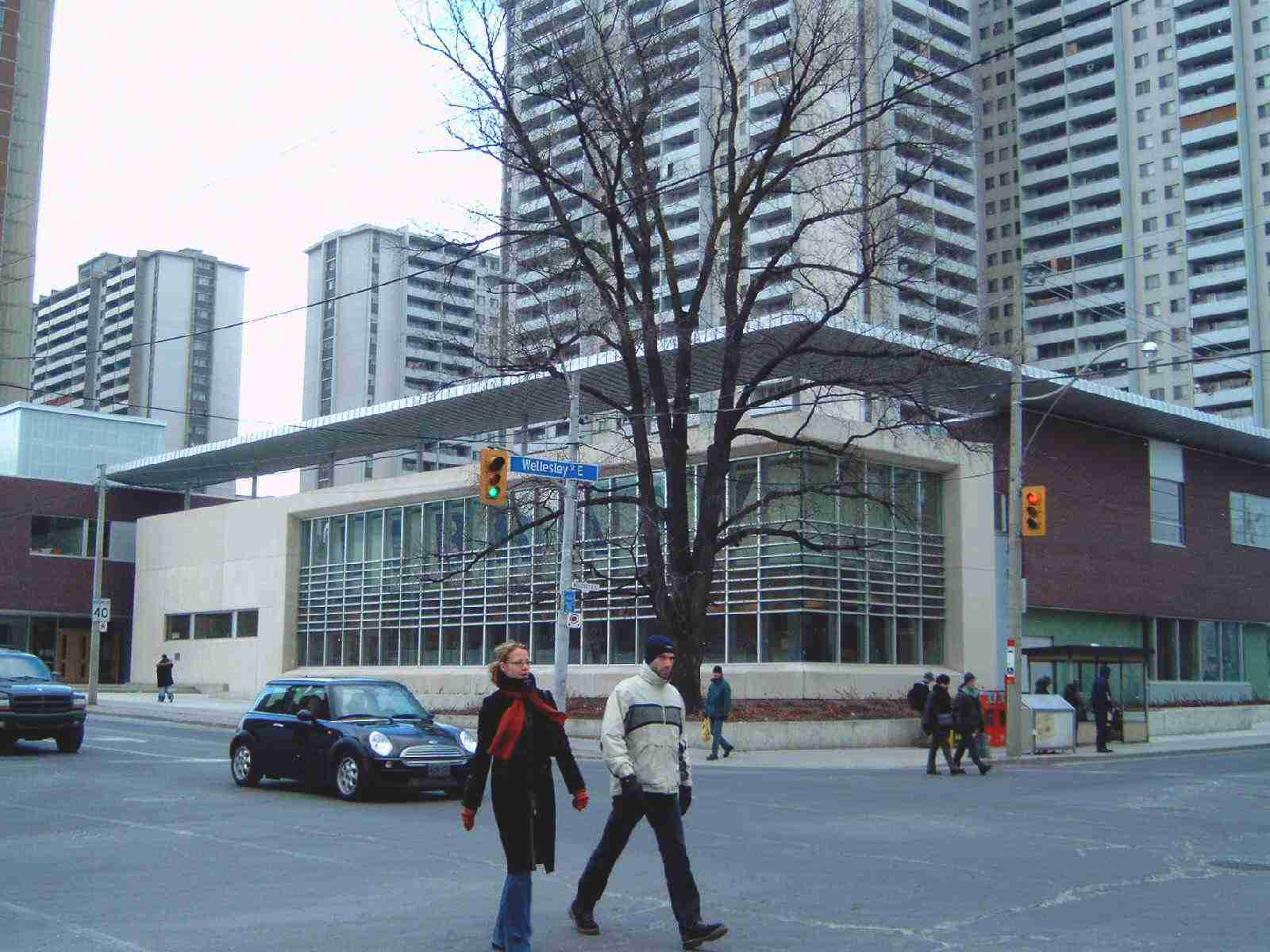
In 2001, a new Toronto Public Library branch and community centre was opened in St. James Town.

After the provincial health care restructuring of the mid-1990s, the Princess Margaret Hospital site on Sherbourne Street became available. In 2001, the City of Toronto launched a major initiative to add social amenities in the area and began the construction of a new Toronto Public Library branch and community centre, which opened in 2004 at the corner of Sherbourne and Wellesley. Lanterra Developments has also proposed plans to replace some of the remaining Victorian homes in St. James Town with several more towers.

On September 24, 2010, a fire broke out on the 24th floor of 200 Wellesley St. East (the white building behind the library and community centre). Fourteen people were taken to hospital due to injuries, including three firefighters and two children. Three of the injuries were classed as serious. The cause of the fire was determined to be a cigarette thrown from a balcony above.

In 2013, St. James Town became the host of the world's tallest mural, pending approval by Guinness.

On August 21, 2018, a fire broke out in an electrical box at 650 Parliament St. Two people suffered only minor injuries, but the entire building, containing 1,500 or more people, had to be evacuated. It took six hours to douse the flames. Reports indicated that evacuees would have to wait "several days" before they would be allowed to return. As of May 2019, re-occupancy had been postponed to late that year due to the complexities of restoration work, including the discovery of a "minor amount" of asbestos.

During the heat dome in June 2024, one of the towers had the water supply cut for 13 hours due to an emergency.

== Demographics ==
Census tract 0065.00 of the 2006 Canadian census covers St. James Town. According to that census, the neighbourhood had 14,666 residents at that time. By the 2011 Canadian census, population had fallen to 13,910. In the 2021 Canadian census, the combined census tracts of 0065.01 and 0065.02 showed a population of 13,770.

Average income reported in the 2006 census was $22,341, one of the lowest in Toronto. In the 2011 National Household Survey, the average income of residents in Ontario is reported to be $42,264. When compared to the average income of residents in this Census Tract from the 2011 Census year, this is a difference of $19,923. When further examined against the average income of residents in Canada, whereby it is reported to be $40,650 in the 2011 National Household Survey, the difference remains similar at $18,309. Both of these differences therefore shows us the sharp income disparities in this Census Tract and its resulting socio-economic impacts on its residents (Census 2006, Census 2011). In addition, this can be seen in the income distribution of the neighbourhood in 2011 with 57% of the inhabitants earning less than $19,999 and only 6% earning more than $60,000. In fact the majority of individuals (82.6%) over the age of 15 earn an income of less than $39,999 before tax.

Property ownership in the area is falling. According to census data, in 2006, 50 people owned one of the limited number of older model properties in the area, but by 2011 that number had fallen to 40.

In terms of the 2011 National Household Survey, there was Global Non-Response rate of 21.7% which means that only 25.8% of the population completed the survey. This number is actually higher than the 20% response rate of the 2006 Long Form census, however due to the voluntary nature of the census, the data is not as reliable compared to the mandatory long form census of 2006. This is because when it is a voluntary census rather one required by law, there is a high chance of non-response bias especially as the GNR grows larger which means that there is a higher chance that those who are responding to the voluntary survey is not completely randomized. In comparison to Canada, which has a GNR of 26.1%, and Ontario, which has a GNR of 27.1%, CT5350065.0 has a lower GNR rate which that there may be less of a non-response bias.

=== Immigration Status ===
The 2006 census recorded a total of 14,666 residents in St. James Town, 14,606 of whom identified themselves as immigrants. In 2011, the population was recorded at 13,974, a decline of only 632 people. However, only 8,180 people (59%) identified as immigrants on the census, a decline of 6,426 from five years earlier. 8% of the population identified as non-permanent residents and 33% identified as non-immigrants.

=== Generation Status ===
According to the 2006 long form census and the 2011 National Household Survey the majority of individuals in St. James Town (census tract 5350065.00) would be categorized as being of first generation status (Statistics Canada, 2006; Statistics Canada, 2011). First generation status applies to people who were born outside of Canada (Statistics Canada, 2011). Second generation refers to people born in Canada but their mother and father were born outside of Canada (Statistics Canada, 2011). The final category, third generation and more, covers people who were born and Canada and both their mother and father were also born in Canada (Statistics Canada, 2011).

The following is a breakdown of the percentages of those considered first, second, and third generation or more in St. James Town in both 2006 and 2011.

2006:

First Generation Status: 78%

Second Generation Status: 8%

Third Generation Status and more: 14%

2011:

First Generation Status: 67%

Second Generation Status: 20%

Third Generation Status and more: 13%

From 2006 to 2011 the biggest change in the generation status occurred in the second-generation category where those considered second generation rose 12% from 8% to 20%. This indicates that individuals that were born in Canada with a mother or father born outside of Canada increased from 2006 to 2011. First generation status, on the other hand, decreased (despite still containing the majority of the population both years) and those considered third generation and more decreased by 1%. It can therefore be concluded that the majority of people living in St. James Town were not born in Canada according to both the 2006 long form census (where they accounted for 78% of those who completed the survey) and the 2011 National Household Survey (where they accounted for 67% of those who completed the survey). This information can be related to previously mentioned data on income and immigration status and diversity.

In 2006 the long form census had a 20% completion rate compared to the 2011 National Household Survey, which had a 25.85% completion rate. Therefore, more people completed the survey in 2011 compared to 2006, but as previously mentioned, one must be aware of a possibility of a non-response bias, meaning those answering the survey might not be random and may have affected the data.

=== Languages spoken ===
Due to its cultural and minority demographics, "St. James Town is a world within a block." It is largely filled with immigrants — especially those who arrived in the 1990s. The ten most common languages in the neighbourhood, after English, are:

1. Tagalog - 8.1%
2. Tamil - 5.5%
3. Unspecified Chinese - 2.5%
4. Mandarin - 2.5%
5. Korean - 1.9%
6. Spanish - 1.8%
7. Russian - 1.8%
8. Serbian - 1.4%
9. Bengali - 1.4%
10. Urdu - 1.4%

== Non-residential content ==
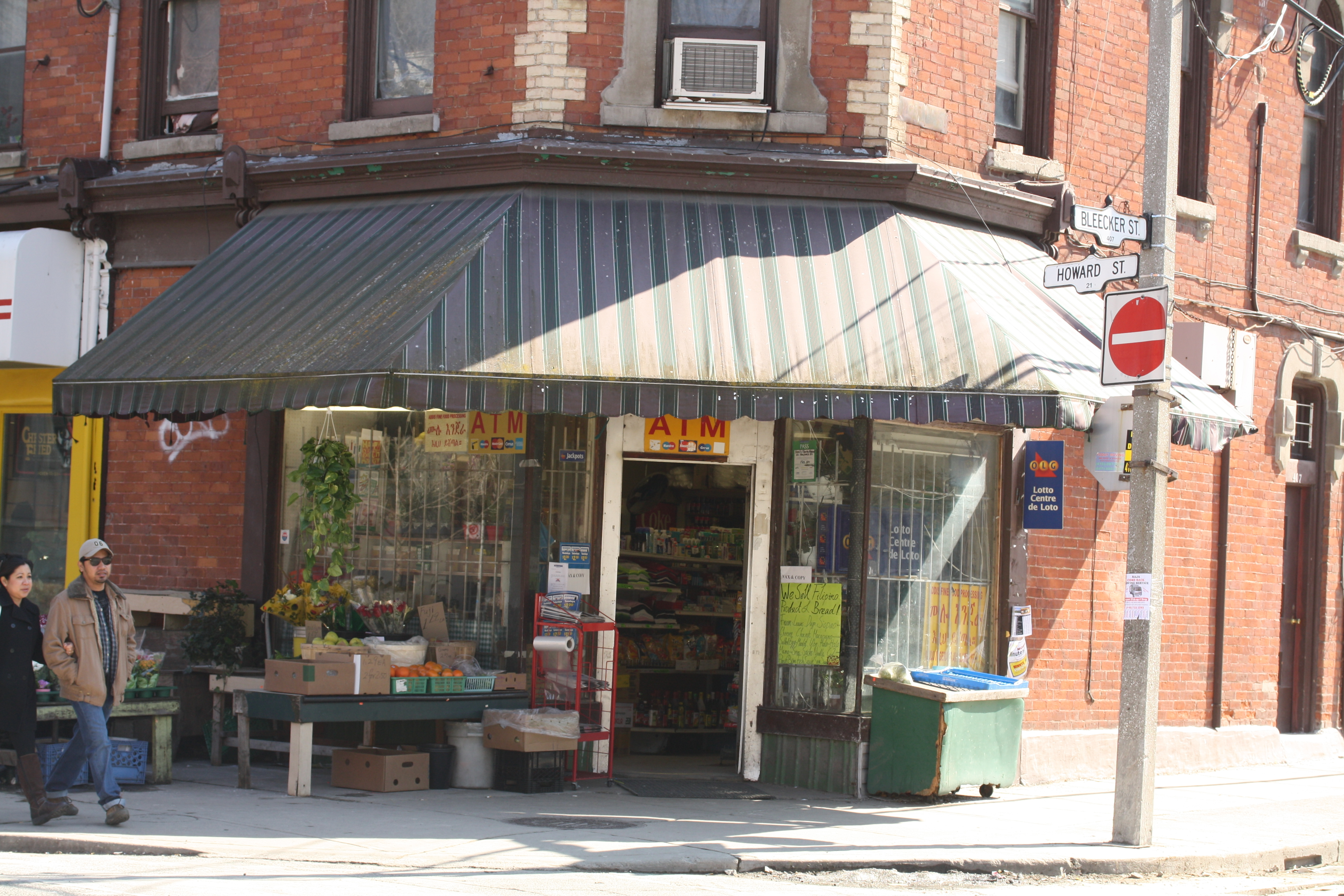
A corner store in St. James Town.

In October 2009, St. James Town contained the following businesses, organizations and institutions:

- Rose Avenue Public School, a Toronto Board of Education school for Kindergarten through grade 6, on Ontario Street north of St. James Avenue
- A community centre and a Toronto Public Library branch, at the intersection of Sherbourne Street and Wellesley Street East
- A food bank at the rear of the building on 275 Bleecker Street
- The St. James Town Youth Council, a body of community youth who meet regularly to address issues in their community. Currently, they host an annual talent show called "Urban Flair" featuring performances by local youth. This competition allows members of the community to support each other and provides an opportunity for new and upcoming stars to take to the stage.
- The St. Jamestown Community Cafe was launched in 2011. This pay-what-you-can cafe hopes to find a permanent home and establish Toronto's first community powered PWYC eating establishment while also providing a place for community members to interact and be entertained. The cafe founders also hope to provide an incubator for other community organizations interested in developing and establishing their own neighbourhood's version of a community powered PWYC cafe.
- In May 2011, the St. James Town Community Corner at 200 Wellesley opened its doors. The Corner is a fully accessible set of offices, meeting spaces, program rooms and community kitchen dedicated to local initiatives and services to benefit the neighbourhood.

The Corner currently operates out of two spaces one at 200 Wellesley Street East which focuses on health, social and settlement services. The other location at 240 Wellesley Street East focuses on local sustainability, waste diversion, green initiatives and skill building. However all services are accessible to residents at both locations.

== Notable people ==
- Olivia Chow, mayor of Toronto, former Member of Parliament and city councillor
- Stephan James, actor, most notable for his role as Jesse Owens in the 2016 film Race
- Serville Poblete, filmmaker

== See also ==
- Sherbourne (TTC)
- List of neighbourhoods in Toronto
