= Turtle Island Rap =

2026 Canadian documentary film

- Directed by: Alexandra Lazarowich
- Production companies: Scenario Media; Ultimate Cree
- Distributed by: Bell Media
- Release date: September 11, 2026 (TIFF)
- Running time: 97 minutes
- Country: Canada
- Language: English

Turtle Island Rap is a Canadian documentary film, directed by Alexandra Lazarowich and slated for release in 2026. The film profiles A$h Da Hunter, Travis Thompson and Wiidaaseh, three emerging Indigenous rappers.

The film is slated to premiere in the TIFF Docs program at the 2026 Toronto International Film Festival.

The film features titles designed by Lola Landekic.
