= Jenna MacMillan =

Jenna MacMillan is a Canadian filmmaker from Charlottetown, Prince Edward Island, best known for her 2026 film The Snake.

Formerly a child actress whose credits included playing Anne of Green Gables in a tourism promotion campaign, she studied film at Ryerson University. She worked principally in Toronto over the next decade due to the relative lack of a local film industry in Prince Edward Island, but regularly took opportunities to work in Prince Edward Island and help build its local film industry infrastructure. She helped to create and facilitate a film training program at Holland College, directed short films and music videos for artists such as Rose Cousins and Kinley Dowling, and produced films including Adam Perry's A Small Fortune and Jeremy Larter's Who's Yer Father?.

She has also been the executive director of the Charlottetown Film Festival since 2023, and spearheaded the festival's 2026 rebranding as Anchor Fest.

According to her frequent collaborator Jonathan Torrens, "Jenna has hired and trained a healthy percentage of the film community on Prince Edward Island. It’s not overstating it to say she is the film industry there."

The Snake, her full-length debut as a director, premiered at SXSW in 2026. She won the award for Best Atlantic Canadian Director at the 2026 Atlantic International Film Festival.
