= Alexandra Lazarowich =

Canadian director

Alexandra Lazarowich is a Cree director and producer from Edmonton, Alberta, Canada. Initially working as a child actress and model, by the age of 27 she had produced 9 films. She is the producer for the Canadian Broadcasting Corporation's Still Standing.

Lazarowich made Fast Horse, a documentary about Blackfoot Indian Relay racers, in honour of Thomas Many Guns of the Siksika Nation, who brought the revitalized sport to the community. Fast Horse won the Short Film Special Jury Award for Directing at the Sundance Film Festival, and the Best Documentary Work Short Format Award at the 2018 ImagineNATIVE Film and Media Arts Festival. Additionally Fast Horse won three Golden Sheaf Awards at the 2019 Yorkton Film Festival, in the Best of Festival, Best Indigenous, and Best Multicultural (Under 30 Minutes) categories.

Other films include Cree Code Talker (2016), about a man using his Indigenous language to relay code during World War II. It won Best Documentary at the 2016 ImagineNATIVE Festival.

Her short documentary LAKE, about Métis women net fishing, was produced by the National Film Board of Canada. It premiered at the 2019 Hot Docs Festival in Toronto and screened at the 2019 ImagineNATIVE festival.

Other awards include: the 2012 American Indian Films Festival Best Animation award for Fighting Chance; and the 2013 Dreamspeakers Film Festival Best Documentary Under 30 Minutes award for Cyber Bullying.

Lazarowich is also the recipient of the Rising Director Mentorship Award from the 2018 ImagineNATIVE Festival.

Turtle Island Rap, her feature documentary debut, is slated to premiere at the 2026 Toronto International Film Festival.
