= 2026 Vancouver International Film Festival =

2026 Canadian film festival

- Opening film: The Debut by Jesse Eisenberg
- Closing film: Wild Horse Nine by Martin McDonagh
- Location: Vancouver, British Columbia, Canada
- Founded: 1958
- Festival date: October 1–11, 2026
- Website: VIFF

Vancouver International Film Festival
- 46th 44th

The 2026 Vancouver International Film Festival, the 45th event in the history of the Vancouver International Film Festival, will be held from October 1 to 11, 2026.

The festival will open with Jesse Eisenberg's film The Debut, and will close with Martin McDonagh's Wild Horse Nine.

The full program was announced on August 26.

== Awards ==
Winners of the juried awards were announced during the festival, with winners of the audience-voted awards announced after the festival's conclusion.

Award	Film	Filmmaker	Ref
Audience Award, Galas & Special Presentations	I Play Rocky	Peter Farrelly	
Audience Award, Showcase	Ceremony	Banchi Hanuse	
Audience Award, Panorama	Iron Boy (Le Corset)	Louis Clichy	
Audience Award, Vanguard	Ana, en passant	Fernanda Salgado	
Audience Award, Northern Lights	Smudge the Blades	Cody Lightning	
Audience Award, Insights	Concrete Land	Asmahan Bkerta	
Audience Award, Spectrum	Daughters of the Forest	Otilia Portillo Padua	
Audience Award, Portraits	Tenor: My Name Is Pati	Rebecca Tansley	
Audience Award, Altered States	Jim Queen (Jim Queen à la recherche de la chloroqueer)	Marco Nguyen, Nicolas Athané	
Audience Award, Focus	Prosecution (Staatsschutz)	Faraz Shariat	
Best Canadian Film (Summit Award)	Nina Roza	Geneviève Dulude-De Celles	
Best Canadian Film, Honorable Mention	Strong Son	Ian Bawa	
Best Canadian Documentary (Tides Award)	Ceremony	Banchi Hanuse	
Best Canadian Documentary, Honorable Mention	Still Night, Burning House	Carol Nguyen	
Best Short Film (Short Forum Award)	Pre-Parenting	Yu Yu	
Best Short Film, Honorable Mention	Going Home	Kamal Aljafari	
Emerging Canadian Director (Horizon Award)	In the Heart of the South	Nyla Innuksuk	
Emerging Canadian Director, Honorable Mention	Clubfoot	Nathan Donovan	
Best BC Film (Arbutus Award)	How We Stand	Marie Clements	
Best BC Film, Honorable Mention	Send the Rain	Hayley Gray, Kaayla Whachell	
Vanguard Award	Hear the Yellow (Günyüzü)	Banu Sıvacı	
Vanguard Award, Honorable Mention	That Shadow Fading	Samuel Urbina	

== Films ==
=== Galas and special presentations ===
English title	Original title	Director(s)	Production country
All of a Sudden	急に具合が悪くなる / Soudain	Ryûsuke Hamaguchi	France, Japan, Germany, Belgium
Behemoth!		Tony Gilroy	United States
The Beloved	El ser querido	Rodrigo Sorogoyen	Spain, France
Bitter Christmas	Amarga Navidad	Pedro Almodóvar	Spain
La bola negra		Javier Calvo, Javier Ambrossi	Spain, France
Club Kid		Jordan Firstman	United States
Coward		Lukas Dhont	Belgium
The Debut		Jesse Eisenberg	United States
Fatherland	Vaterland	Paweł Pawlikowski	Poland, France, Italy, Germany
Fjord		Cristian Mungiu	Romania, France, Norway, Sweden, Denmark
I Play Rocky		Peter Farrelly	United States
A Long Winter		Andrew Haigh	United States, Canada, United Kingdom
Look Back	ルックバック	Hirokazu Kore-eda	Japan
Minotaur	Минотавр	Andrey Zvyagintsev	France, Germany, Latvia
The Only Living Pickpocket in New York		Noah Segan	United States
Paper Tiger		James Gray	United States, Brazil, Italy
Possible Love	가능한 사랑	Lee Chang-dong	South Korea
Rose		Markus Schleinzer	Austria, Germany
Tender Loving Care		Mike Leigh	United Kingdom
Whatcha Want		Mina Shum	Canada
Wild Horse Nine		Martin McDonagh	United Kingdom, United States, Chile
Your Mother Your Mother Your Mother		Bassam Tariq	United States

=== Showcase ===
English title	Original title	Director(s)	Production country
All the Lovers in the Night	すべて真夜中の恋人たち	Yukiko Sode	Japan
A Bit of Light	Kami nour	Ali Asgari	Iran, Switzerland, Italy, Canada, Turkey
Ceremony		Banchi Hanuse	Canada
Clarissa		Arie Esiri, Chuko Esiri	Nigeria, United States, Egypt
Dao		Alain Gomis	France, Guinea-Bissau, Senegal
The Diary of a Chambermaid	Le journal d'une femme de chambre	Radu Jude	France, Romania
The Dreamed Adventure	Das Geträumte Abenteuer	Valeska Grisebach	Germany, France, Bulgaria, Austria
The Flight		Soran Mardookhi	Canada
Gentle Monster		Marie Kreutzer	Austria
The Guest		Mads Mengel	Denmark
The History of Concrete		John Wilson	United States
How We Stand		Marie Clements	Canada
I See Buildings Fall Like Lightning		Clio Barnard	United Kingdom, France, United States
Ladies and Gentlemen, Brian Mulroney	Mesdames et Messieurs, Brian Mulroney	Matthew Rankin	Canada
Man in Motion: The Rick Hansen Story		Adrian Buitenhuis	Canada
Mouse		Kelly O'Sullivan, Alex Thompson	United States
Nagi Notes	ナギダイアリー	Kōji Fukada	Japan, France, Singapore, Philippines
Nowhere to Lay My Eyes	Nunduldega eomne	Hong Sangsoo	South Korea
Queen at Sea		Lance Hammer	United Kingdom, United States
Reclaim My Skin (Episode 1–3)		Marie Clements	Canada
Run Terry Run		Sean Menard	Canada
School for Defectors		Jeremy Workman	South Korea, United States
The Story of Documentary Film: "The 2000s: Chapter 12–13		Mark Cousins	United Kingdom, United States
The Story of Documentary Film: "The 2010s and 2020s: Chapter 14–16"		Mark Cousins	United Kingdom, United States
Tangles		Leah Nelson	Canada, United States
Yellow Letters	Gelbe Briefe	İlker Çatak	Germany, Turkey, France
Yugo Goes to America		Filip Grujić, Aleksa Borković	Serbia, Croatia

=== Panorama ===
English title	Original title	Director(s)	Production country
17		Kosara Mitić	North Macedonia, Slovenia, Serbia
9 Temples to Heaven	9 วัด สู่สวรรค์	Sompot Chidgasornpongse	Thailand, Singpore, France, Norway, China, Hong Kong, Indonesia, Qatar
Afterpiece		Keane T.K. Wong	Hong Kong
Árru		Elle Sofe Sara	Norway, Sweden, Finland
Congo Boy		Rafiki Fariala	Central African Republic, France, Democratic Republic of the Congo, Italy
The Difficult Bride		Rubaiyat Hossain	France, Bangladesh, Germany, Norway, Portugal
Elephants in the Fog	तिनीहरू	Abinash Bikram Shah	Nepal, France, Germany, Brazil, Norway
Everytime		Sandra Wollner	Austria, Germany
Fireflies in the Dark		Yogesh Lohan	India
Flesh and Fuel	Du Fioul dans les artères	Pierre Le Gall	France, Poland
Flies	Moscas	Fernando Eimbcke	Mexico
Frank & Louis		Petra Volpe	Switzerland, United Kingdom
Fruit Gathering	သစ်သီးခူး	Aung Phyoe	Myanmar, Czech Republic, France
A Girl Unknown		Zou Jing	China, France
La Gradiva		Marine Atlan	France, Italy
Heysel 85		Teodora Ana Mihai	Belgium, Netherlands, Germany
Idda		Irene Dionisio	Italy
In Alaska		Jaap van Heusden, Vinnie Karetak	Netherlands, Canada
Iron Boy	Le Corset	Louis Clichy	France, Belgium
Lali		Sarmad Khoosat	Pakistan
Light Pillar	寒夜灯柱	Xu Zao	China
Linka Linka		Kangdrun	China
The Loneliest Man in Town	Wiener Blues	Tizza Covi, Rainer Frimmel	Austria
Nina Roza		Geneviève Dulude-De Celles	Canada, Italy, Bulgaria, Belgium
No Good Men		Shahrbanoo Sadat	Germany, France, Norway, Denmark, Afghanistan
Nobody's Violence	Violence du corps à l'autre	Denis Côté	Canada
Paris Paris		Isabelle Tollenaere	Belgium
The Quiet Applause		Byun Sung-bin	South Korea
Roid	রইদ	Mejbaur Rahman Sumon	Bangladesh
Shame and Money		Visar Morina	Germany, Kosovo, Slovenia, Albania, North Macedonia, Belgium
Sweet Milk Lake		Harvey Zielinski	Australia
Take Me Home		Liz Sargent	United States
We Are All Strangers	我们不是陌生人	Anthony Chen	Singapore
What Remains	Artakalan	Yeşim Ustaoğlu	Turkey, Luxembourg, France, Bulgaria
Where the River Begins	Donde comenzia el rio	Juan Andrés Arango	Canada, Colombia, Norway
Yasha		Naghi Nemati	Iran, Germany

=== Vanguard ===
English title	Original title	Director(s)	Production country
Ana, En Passant		Fernanda Salgado	Brazil, Portugal
Forest High		Manon Coubia	Belgium, France
Hear the Yellow	Günyüzü	Banu Sıvacı	Turkey
Hearing		Bảo Lê	Vietnam, Singapore, Norway, France, Indonesia, Saudi Arabia, Cambodia, Thailand, Taiwan
I Plant My Hand in the Garden		Boris Hadžija, Hoda Taheri	Germany, Serbia, United States
Lady		Olive Nwosu	United Kingdom, Nigeria
Lust		Ralitza Petrova	Bulgaria, Denmark, Sweden
That Shadow Fading		Samuel Urbina	Peru

=== Northern Lights ===
English title	Original title	Director(s)	Production country
Ba's Book		Ashley Duong	Canada
The Bryce Lee Story		Arnold Lim	Canada
Clubfoot		Nathan Donovan	Canada
First Comes Love: Nakabingwit		Joella Cabalu	Canada
The Gymnasts of Fisherman Colony		Habiba Nosheen	Canada
In the Heart of the South		Nyla Innuksuk	Canada
Lifeline		Ilhan Abdullahi	Canada
Pocket Mirror		Adrian Murray	Canada
Relax, Open Your Eyes		David Ehrenreich	Canada
A Safe Distance		Gloria Mercer	Canada
Send the Rain		Hayley Gray, Kaayla Whachell	Canada
Seventeen		Justin Ducharme	Canada
Smudge the Blades		Cody Lightning	Canada
Still Night, Burning House		Carol Nguyen	Canada
Strong Son		Ian Bawa	Canada
Turtle Island Rap		Alexandra Lazarowich	Canada

=== Insights ===
English title	Original title	Director(s)	Production country
Birds of War		Janay Boulos, Abd Alkader Habak	United Kingdom, Syrian Arab Republic, Lebanon
Closure		Michał Marczak	Poland, France
Concrete Land		Asmahan Bkerta	Jordan, Palestine
A Distant Call		Andrea Suwito	France, Indonesia, United Kingdom
A Fire There	Un feu au loin	Marlene Edoyan	Canada
Gabin		Maxence Voiseux	France, Germany, Switzerland
Heat		Jacqueline Zünd	Switzerland
Kikuyu Land		Andrew H. Brown, Bea Wangondu	Kenya, United States
Nitassinan		Joséphine Bacon, Kim O'Bomsawin	Canada
Nuisance Bear		Jack Weisman, Gabriela Osio Vanden	Canada, United States
Once Upon a Time in Harlem		William Greaves, David Greaves	United States
A Place of Absence		Marialuisa Ernst	United States, Bolivia, Mexico
Revolutionaries Never Die		Mohanad Yaqubi	Palestine, Belgium, Qatar
Whispers in May		Dongnan Chen	Hong Kong, Netherlands, South Korea, Sweden
Who Moves America		Yael Bridge	United States
The Wind's Thirst		Alejandro Valbuena	Canada, Colombia

=== Spectrum ===
English title	Original title	Director(s)	Production country
Ancestor/Great-Grandparent/Great-Grandchild	Aanikoobijigan	Adam Khalil, Zack Khalil	United States, Denmark
Afterlives		Kevin B. Lee	Germany, France, Belgium
Crocodile		The Critics, Pietra Brettkelly	Nigeria, New Zealand
Daughters of the Forest		Otilia Portillo Padua	Mexico
An Incomplete Calendar		Sanaz Sohrabi	Canada, Iran, Turkey, Venezuela
Into the Jaws of the Ogre		Mahsa Karampour	France
Jaripeo		Efraín Mojica, Rebecca Zweig	Mexico, United States, Framce
Last Movies		Stanley Schtinter	United Kingdom
Let Them Be Seen		Nolitha Refilwe Mkulisi	South Africa, Germany
Yo (Love Is a Rebellious Bird)		Anna Fitch, Banker White	United States

=== Portraits ===
English title	Original title	Director(s)	Production country
Agridulce (Bittersweet)		Frank Pavich	United States, Dominican Republic
Farruquito: A Flamenco Dynasty		Santi Aguado, Reuben Atlas	Spain, United States
Fugs Film!		Chuck Smith	United States
James McNeill Whistler		David Bickerstaff	United Kingdom
Nous, l'orchestre de Paris		Philippe Béziat	France
Our Mr. Matsura		Beth Harrington	United States
Radioheart: The Drive and Times of DJ Kevin Cole		Peter Hilgendorf, Andrew Franks	United States
Rebecca Horn – the Secret Life of Things		Claudia Müller	Germany
Tenor: My Name Is Pati		Rebecca Tansley	New Zealand
Wolf		Christian Cargill	United Kingdom

=== Leading Lights ===
Guest curator: Sophy Romvari.

English title	Original title	Director(s)	Production country
Close-Up	Klūzāp, nemā-ye nazdīk	Abbas Kiarostami	Iran
The Tree of Life		Terrence Malick	United States
Vengeance Is Mine		Michael Roemer	United States

=== Focus on New German Cinema: Extreme Tension ===
English title	Original title	Director(s)	Production country
The Ballad from Wednesday to Thursday	Die Ballade von Mittwoch auf Donnerstag	Christoph Otto	Germany
Dear Future Self	Erzähl Mir Dein Morgen	Ella Cieslinski, Nina Wesemann	Germany
I Understand Your Displeasure	Ich verstehe Ihren Unmut	Kilian Armando Friedrich	Germany
Prosecution	Staatsschutz	Faraz Shariat	Germany
Sometimes, I Imagine Them All at a Party	Was an Empfindsamkeit bleibt	Daniela Magnani Hüller	Germany
Trial of Hein	Der Heimatlose	Kai Stänicke	Germany

=== Altered States ===
English title	Original title	Director(s)	Production country
Death Has No Master	La muerte no tiene dueño	Jorge Thielen Armand	Venezuela, Canada, Italy, Luxembourg
Family Fears Another Night of Terror	Familia teme enfrentar una nueva noche de terror	Cristian Ponce	Argentina
Freaks Part II		Zach Lipovsky, Adam Stein	Canada
Gasmask		Harry Cepka	Canada, United States
Jim Queen	Jim Queen à la recherche de la Chloroqueer	Nicolas Athane, Marco Nguyen	France
Midnight Momo		Tenzin Yeshi	United States
The Peril at Pincer Point		Noah Stratton-Twine, Jake Kuhn	United Kingdom
Soul Catcher	Haboolm Ksinaalgat	Amanda Strong, Pamela Post	Canada
Species		Marion Le Corroller	France, Belgium
Twin Snakes		Lev Kalman, Whitney Horn	United States
Ugly Cry		Emily Robinson	United States
Wicker		Alex Huston Fischer, Eleanor Wilson	United States

=== Short Forum ===
English title	Original title	Director(s)	Province
Acid City		Jack Wedge, Will Freudenheim	United States
Already Happened		Hao Zhou	China, United States
The Ambassador's Daughter		Armon Mahdavi	United States
The Animal Remains		Ivana Vogrinc Hovorka Vidali	Slovenia, Czech Republic
Bagman		Connor Gaston, Vaughn Gaston	Canada
A Breath of Fresh Air		Alexandre Pelletier	Canada
Buddies		Fraser Wolfe	Canada
Chuuraa		Evgenia Arbugaeva	United Kingdom
Collectors		Andrew Cividino	Canada
The Comet		Julie Charette	Canada
Concrete Kids		Saulius Baradinskas	Lithuania
Cul-de-Sac!		Clyde Gates, Gabriel Sanson	Belgium, France
Dance of the Sun on the Water		Ming Wong	United Kingdom
Daughters of the Late Colonel		Elizabeth Hobbs	United Kingdom, Germany
The Days With Her		Lina Nonato Montanari	Brazil
The Dream Is a Snail	Giấc mơ là ốc sên	Ân Thiên Nguyễn	Vietnam
The End		Niki Lindroth von Bahr	Sweden, France, Denmark
Endless Sunlight		Tyson Houseman	Canada
The Fading of Morning Light		Jessamine Yú Fok	Canada, Hong Kong
Faux Bijoux		Jessy Moussallem	France, Lebanon
First Breath on Mars		Malic Amalya	United States
Free Fish		Bisan Owda	Palestine, Portugal
Going Home		Kamal Aljafari	Germany, Palestine, France
Going Nowhere Fast		Dylan Paffe	Canada, United States
The Great Disgust		Alejandro Samandjian	Argentina
Half a Decade of Projecting		Jana Rankov	Canada
Husband’s Legs		Kimi Yawata	Japan
I Think You Should Be Here		Anna-Marija Adomaitytė, Élie Grappe	France, Switzerland
L'Inconvénient		Julien G. Marcotte	Canada
Invisible Harvests		Stephanie Dudley	Canada
Jabber		Aubert Sénéchal	Canada
The Kalgan Horse		Zichen Zhao	China, United States
Letters from Tibet		Kunsang Kyirong	Canada
The Lion Does Not Concern Himself		Zarrar Kahn	Canada
Lippenstift		Elsa Diringer	France
A Lonely Night		Camille Beaubi	Canada
Lovely Butterfly		Fairouz Hasan	Palestine
Man Eating Pussy		Emily Lawson	Canada, United States
The Man in the Showers		Hakim Atoui	France
Materia		Alisi Telengut	Canada
Memories of a Window		Mehraneh Salimian, Amin Pakparvar	Iran, United States
My Aunt		Eung-kyoung Wi, Gwang-Min Son	South Korea
O		Francisca Alarcão	Portugal
Object of Riddle		Chiara Caterina	Belgium, Italy
Pacific Spirit		Antoine Bourges	Canada
Pankaja		Anooya Swamy	India, United States
Piluk		Elisapie, Marc Séguin	Canada
Pique-Nique		Jérémy Gagnon	Canada
Praying Mantis		Joe Hsieh	Taiwan, Hong Kong
Pre-Parenting		Yu Yu	Taiwan
Rotation		Maryna Er Gorbach	Ukraine, Sweden, Turkey
Saint and the Sea		Abdullah Khan	Canada, Kuwait, Pakistan
Self-Preserving Nudity		Nelly Shylova	Ireland, Ukraine
Shards		Luciana Decker	Bolivia
Shoot the Messenger		Pranay Noel	Canada
Sitting Bird		Athena Han	Canada
Skinny Boots	Skinny Bottines	Romain F. Dubois	Canada
Spag		Louis Brousseau	Canada
Stallion and a Crystal Ball		Christian Avilés	Spain
Sweet Captive		Paul Chotel, Ariane Falardeau St-Amour	Canada
Take Care		Faith Sparrow-Crawford, Scarlett Sparrow-Felix	Canada
Taxi Moto		Gaël Kamilindi	France, Switzerland
These Voices Are Real		Baran Nikrah	Iran
Tristesse		Yuri Muraoka	Japan
Two Hander		Norah Sadava	Canada
Udders!		Michael Spencer	United States
“Vaterland” or a Bule Named Yanto		Berthold Wahjudi	Germany, Indonesia
Vulnus		Diandra Arriaga	Mexico
White		Navroz Shaban	Iraq
Who Killed Narin G****?		Ayçe Kartal	France
With You		Samantha Chater	Canada

=== Modes ===
English title	Original title	Director(s)	Production country
Between Us and the World		Wallace Minchong Li	United Kingdom
The Blessing		Caroline Poggi, Jonathan Vinel	France, Switzerland
Cartografía		Marinthia Gutiérrez Velazco	Mexico
Display Nature		Nicolas Gebbe	Germany
A Dream Pointing to Aadchit		Ghinwa Yassine	Canada, Lebanon
Ghazal-E Sorkh		Maryam Tafakory	Iran, United Kingdom, France
Golden Island		Arief Budiman	Indonesia, Singapore
Kontrewers		Zuza Banasińska	Poland, Netherlands
Like Moths to Light		Gala Hernández López	Spain, Italy, France
Occupation of the Inner Life		Rosalind Nashashibi	Ireland, Palestine
Oh Be a Fine Girl Kiss Me		Alice dos Reis	Portugal
Opera Kitsch		C. Ricardo, Lobo Mauro	Brazil
The Recce		Daniel Mann	United Kingdom, Germany
Soft Transmission		Sara Wylie	Canada
This Is an Autopsy		Lucia Selva	Spain
Together		NEOZOON	Germany
Typhoon Mambo		Domenico Singha Pedroli	Thailand, Switzerland, France
The Wind, One Brilliant Day		Ben Rivers	China, United Kingdom
