= 2026 Festival du nouveau cinéma =

Independent film festival in Canada

- Opening film: Nobody's Violence (Violence du corps à l'autre) by Denis Côté
- Closing film: L'Autre by Alexandre Franchi
- Location: Montreal, Quebec, Canada
- Founded: 1971
- Festival date: October 8-18, 2026
- Website: nouveaucinema.ca/en

Festival du nouveau cinéma
- 2027 2025

The 2026 edition of the Festival du nouveau cinéma, the 55th edition in the event's history, took place from October 8 to 18, 2026, in Montreal, Quebec, Canada.

The festival's first programming announcements, including opening film Nobody's Violence (Violence du corps à l'autre) by Denis Côté, were announced on August 17, with a second preview announcement released on August 25.

The full schedule was released on September 22.

== Awards ==
Award winners were announced at the conclusion of the festival.

The 2026 awards program included a new Queer Louve award for LGBTQ films, created in conjunction with the Cannes Film Festival's Queer Palm to replace the FNC's former Fierté Montréal award.

| Award | Film | Recipient(s) |
|---|---|---|
| International Competition, Louve d'Or for Best Feature Film | I Plant My Hand in the Garden | Boris Hadžija, Hoda Taheri |
| International Competition, Best Performance Award | Under a Bad Star (Mauvaise étoile) | Noémie Édé-Decugis |
| International Competition, Best Performance Special Mention | 17 | Eva Kostic |
| International Competition, Daniel Langlois Innovation Award | Two Mountains Weighing Down My Chest | Viv Li |
| National Competition, Grand Prix for Best Feature Film | Clubfoot | Nathan Donovan |
| New Alchemists, Best Feature Film | If Pigeons Turned to Gold (Kdyby se holubi proměnili ve zlato) | Pepa Lubojacki |
| Queer Louve | A Secret Heart (Cœur Secret) | Tom Fontenille |
| FIPRESCI Award for Best First Feature Film | Under a Bad Star (Mauvaise étoile) | Yann Berlier, Lola Cambourieu |
| Temps Ø Audience Award | Totality | David Heilbroner, Kate Davis |
| International Panorama, Audience Award | Where the River Begins (Donde comenzia el rio) | Juan Andrés Arango |
| International Competition, Loup Argenté for Best Short Film | Stallion and a Crystal Ball | Christian Avilés |
| National Competition, Grand Prize for Best Short Film | The Comet (La Comète) | Julie Charette |
| National Competition, Short Film Special Mention | I Am the Heir (La Chaleur du dauphin) | Lou Scamble |
| National Competition, People's Choice Award for Best Short Film | Skinny Boots (Skinny Bottines) | Romain F. Dubois |
| New Alchemists, Dada International Prize for Best Short Film | Ãsheghetam | Saleh Kashefi |
| New Alchemists, Dada National Prize for Best Short Film | Au hasard | Darren Dominique Heroux |
| New Alchemists, Best Animated Short Film | Acid City | Will Freudenheim, Jack Wedge |
| RPCÉ, Grand Prize for Best Short Film | Party Girl | Alice Paradis |
| RPCÉ, Best Short Film Special Mention | You'll Feel Some Slight Pressure | Mimi Huszti |
| RPCÉ, Jeune Loup Prize for Best Short Film | Il neige à Safad | Jérémie Racicot-Haddad |
| RPCÉ, Vidéographe Coup de Coeur Prize | Teeth Don't Have Sex | Anita Monteiro |
| RPCÉ, Best Animation | Roomba et moi | Delphine Vincent |
| P'tits Loups, People's Choice Award for Best Short Film | Noctambules | Lena von Döhren |
| Campus Critique, Grand Prix | Elephants in the Fog (तिनीहरू) | Abinash Bikram Shah |
| Prix du Nouveau Marché | The Hearse to the Final House of Happiness | Wisam Al Jafari, Hanna Atallah |
| Prix du Nouveau Marché, Special Mention | All Must Burn at Smuggle's Lane | Xenia Glen, Yemi Adegbulu |
| Pitch Premières Œuvres, FNC Prize | Bruit du fil rouge | Laurence Ly, Koussay Hamzeh |
| Pitch Premières Œuvres, SLA Location Prize | La Fin du monde | François Ouf |
| Pitch Premières Œuvres, Outpost Prize | Milieu de vie | Olivier Côté, Geneviève Gosselin-G. |

== Juries ==
- National Competition, Feature Films: Thomas Hakim, Hugo Scheubel, Pamela Varela
- International Competition, Feature Films: Pierre-Yves Cardinal, Julien Élie, Dominique Sirois-Rouleau
- National Competition, Short Films: Mari Liis Keevallik, Nicolas Khabbaz, Andreea Pătru
- International Competition, Short Films: Jérémy Gagnon, Dominick Rustam, Isabelle Stachtchenko
- New Alchemists: Irina Tempea, Alina Herta, Moia Jobin-Paré
- New Alchemists, Short Films: Solenne d’Arnoux de Fleury, Daniel Racine, André Roy
- Queer Louve: Eli Jean Tahchi, Gabrielle Boulianne-Tremblay, Sami Landri
- RPCÉ: Romain F. Dubois, Ariane Roy-Poirier, Zuza/Juzek Kopcińska
- FIPRESCI: Elijah Baron, Manon Marcillat, Rubén Peralta Rigaud
- Campus Critique: Rachel Goulet, Virginie Pronovost, Juliette Roland
- First Works Pitch: Bianca Bellange, Ilann Girard, Flavia Zanon
- International Projects: Sol Bondy, Serge Noël, Amanda Trokan

== Official selections ==
=== Opening and closing films ===
| English title | Original title | Director(s) | Production country |
|---|---|---|---|
| L'Autre | | Alexandre Franchi | Canada |
| Nobody's Violence | Violence du corps à l'autre | Denis Côté | Canada |

=== International Competition ===
| English title | Original title | Director(s) | Production country |
|---|---|---|---|
| 17 | | Kosara Mitić | North Macedonia, Serbia, Slovenia |
| 9 Temples to Heaven | 9 วัด สู่สวรรค์ | Sompot Chidgasornpongse | Thailand, Singapore, France, Norway, China, Hong Kong, Indonesia, Qatar |
| Everytime | | Sandra Wollner | Austria, Germany |
| Filipiñana | | Rafael Manuel | United Kingdom, Philippines, Singapore, France, Netherlands |
| The House on the Moon | | Nelson Yeo | Singapore, Taiwan, Germany, Indonesia |
| I Plant My Hand in the Garden | | Boris Hadžija, Hoda Taheri | Germany, Serbia, United States |
| Two Mountains Weighing Down My Chest | | Viv Li | Germany, Netherlands |
| Under a Bad Star | Mauvaise étoile | Yann Berlier, Lola Cambourieu | France |

=== National Competition ===
| English title | Original title | Director(s) | Production country |
|---|---|---|---|
| Clubfoot | | Nathan Donovan | Canada |
| The Color of the Sun | | Xavier Tera | Canada, Italy, Japan |
| A Fire There | Un feu au loin | Marlene Edoyan | Canada |
| In the Heart of the South | | Nyla Innuksuk | Canada |
| Manhunt | | Wayne Wapeemukwa | Canada |
| The Shimmering Shadows | Les Ombres lumineuses | Nicolas Dufour-Laperrière | Canada |
| Still Night, Burning House | | Carol Nguyen | Canada |

=== International Panorama ===
| English title | Original title | Director(s) | Production country |
|---|---|---|---|
| A Day in the Life of Jo: Chapter Phaedra | Mia mera sti zoi tis tzo: kefalaio Faidra | Jacqueline Lentzou | Greece, Germany, France |
| Elephants in the Fog | तिनीहरू | Abinash Bikram Shah | Nepal, France, Germany, Brazil, Norway |
| I'll Be Gone in June | | Katharina Rivilis | Switzerland, Germany, United States |
| The Illusion of an Everlasting Summer | La ilusión de un verano sin fin | Alessandra Sanguinetti | Argentina, United States |
| Rehearsals for a Revolution | خاطرات ایران | Pegah Ahangarani | Czech Republic, Spain |
| A Secret Heart | Cœur Secret | Tom Fontenille | France |
| Sometimes Sadness, Sometimes Rebellion | A veces me entra tristeza, otras veces rebelión | María Aparicio | Argentina, Spain |
| Where the River Begins | Donde comenzia el rio | Juan Andrés Arango | Canada, Colombia, Norway |
| You Don't Belong Here | Nu e locul tău aici | Florin Șerban | Romania |

=== The New Alchemists (Les Nouveaux alchimistes) ===
| English title | Original title | Director(s) | Production country |
|---|---|---|---|
| At Night | | Beatrice Gibson | United Kingdom, France |
| Az Zeeb | | Rafael Guendelman | Chile, Qatar |
| Chronovisor | | Jack Auen, Kevin Walker | United States |
| Holy Destructors | | Aistė Žegulytė | Lithuania, France, Latvia |
| If Pigeons Turned to Gold | Kdyby se holubi proměnili ve zlato | Pepa Lubojacki | Czech Republic, Slovakia |
| Objet a | | Ann Oren | Germany, Luxembourg, Greece |
| Prelude and Fugues: The Wood Thrush | Préludes et fugues - la grive des bois | Pierre Hébert | Canada |
| Second Skin | | Mariia Lapidus | United States, Mexico |

=== The Essentials (Les Incontournables) ===
| English title | Original title | Director(s) | Production country |
|---|---|---|---|
| Bitter Christmas | Amarga Navidad | Pedro Almodóvar | Spain |
| La bola negra | | Javier Calvo, Javier Ambrossi | Spain, France |
| Butterfly Jam | | Kantemir Balagov | France |
| Club Kid | | Jordan Firstman | United States |
| Dao | | Alain Gomis | France, Guinea-Bissau, Senegal |
| The Diary of a Chambermaid | Le journal d'une femme de chambre | Radu Jude | France, Romania |
| The Dreamed Adventure | Das Geträumte Abenteuer | Valeska Grisebach | Germany, France, Bulgaria, Austria |
| Fatherland | Vaterland | Paweł Pawlikowski | Poland, France, Italy, Germany |
| Let Us Through, Dear Ancestors | Makikiraan Po | Lav Diaz | Philippines |
| A Long Winter | | Andrew Haigh | United States, Canada, United Kingdom |
| Look Back | Rukku Bakku | Hirokazu Kore-eda | Japan |
| Minotaur | Минотавр | Andrey Zvyagintsev | France, Germany, Latvia |
| My Wife Cries | Meine Frau weint | Angela Schanelec | Germany, France |
| Red Rocks | Les Roches rouges | Bruno Dumont | France |
| Rose | | Markus Schleinzer | Austria, Germany |
| Shumei: The Living Legacy of Kabuki | | Takashi Miike | Japan |
| Sixteen Moments of My Life | Seize moments de ma vie | Albert Serra | Spain, France |
| Tender Loving Care | | Mike Leigh | United Kingdom |
| Wild Horse Nine | | Martin McDonagh | United Kingdom, United States, Chile |

=== Temps 0 ===
| English title | Original title | Director(s) | Production country |
|---|---|---|---|
| Arrested Memory | | Sabu | Taiwan, Japan |
| The Best Summer | | Tamra Davis | United States |
| Claire à Montréal | | Cécile Herreman | France, Canada |
| The Day We Embraced the Universe | | Kenichi Ugana | Japan |
| The History of Concrete | | John Wilson | United States |
| A Mighty Adventure | | Toe Yuen | Taiwan, Malaysia, Hong Kong |
| Mr. Nelson, Did You Kill People? | ネルソンさん、あなたは人を殺しましたか? | Shinya Tsukamoto | Japan |
| Oddities | | Tyler Savage | |
| Oscillation | | Kenichi Ugana | Japan |
| Roma Elastica | | Bertrand Mandico | France, Italy |
| Screengazer | | Kenichi Ugana | Japan |
| They Lurk Beneath Eyelids | | Pat Tremblay | Canada |
| Totality | | David Heilbroner, Kate Davis | United States |
| Vertiginous | Le Vertige | Quentin Dupieux | France |
| When the World Will Look at Us | Quand le monde nous regardera | Théo Hellerman | France |
Grand-Guignol & Early Cine-Macabre
| Balaoo the Demon Baboon | | Victorin-Hippolyte Jasset | France |
| The Cutter of Heads | Le Coupeur des têtes | Pathé | France |
| Delilah | | Fred Paul | United Kingdom |
| A Desperate Crime | Les Incendiares | Georges Méliès | France |
| The Doll's Revenge | | Cecil Hepworth | United Kingdom |
| The Execution of Mary, Queen of Scots | | Alfred Clark | United States |
| Figures of Wax | Figures de cire | Maurice Tourneur | France |
| The Flat | | Fred Paul | United Kingdom |
| The Hand | La Main | Édouard-Émile Violet | France |
| The House of the Devil | Le Manoir du diable | Georges Méliès | France |
| The Jest | | Fred Paul | United Kingdom |
| Suspense | Lois Weber, Phillips Smalley | United States | |
| Terrible Anguish | Terrible angoisse | Lucien Nonguet | France |
| Those Who Worry About It | Celles qui s'en font | Germaine Dulac | France |

=== Special Presentations ===
| English title | Original title | Director(s) | Production country |
FNC x Momenta: Ali Cherri
| Beirut the Encounter | Beyrouth la rencontre | Borhane Alaouié | Lebanon |
| The Dam | Le Barrage | Ali Cherri | Lebanon |
Ōshima Mon Amour
| In the Realm of the Senses | | Nagisa Ōshima | Japan |
| Max mon amour | | Nagisa Ōshima | France, Japan |
| Merry Christmas, Mr. Lawrence | Furyo | Nagisa Ōshima | Japan, United Kingdom, New Zealand |
Matrix After Dark
| The Animatrix | | Andy Jones, Mahiro Maeda, Shinichirō Watanabe, Yoshiaki Kawajiri, Takeshi Koike, Kōji Morimoto, Peter Chung | United States, Japan, South Korea |
| The Matrix | | The Wachowskis | United States |
| The Matrix Reloaded | | The Wachowskis | United States |
| The Matrix Revolutions | | The Wachowskis | United States |
| The Matrix Resurrections | | The Wachowskis | United States |
Spotlight: Adrienne Barbeau
| Escape from New York | | John Carpenter | United States |
| The Fog | | John Carpenter | United States |
| Oddities | | Tyler Savage | United States |

=== History of Cinema (Histoire(s) du cinéma) ===
| English title | Original title | Director(s) | Production country |
|---|---|---|---|
| Barbara Forever | | Brydie O'Connor | United States |
| Dernsie: The Amazing Life of Bruce Dern | | Mike Mendez | United States |
| Double Freedom | La libertad doble | Lisandro Alonso | Argentina, Chile, Luxembourg, Germany, United Kingdom |
| Freedom | La libertad | Lisandro Alonso | Argentina |
| Imperium | | Sergei Loznitsa | Germany, Italy, France, Lithuania |
| In the Realm of the Senses | | Nagisa Ōshima | Japan |
| Max mon amour | | Nagisa Ōshima | France, Japan |
| Merry Christmas, Mr. Lawrence | Furyo | Nagisa Ōshima | Japan, United Kingdom, New Zealand |
| The Sweet Hereafter | | Atom Egoyan | Canada |
| Wild Skin | La peau sauvage | Ariane Louis-Seize | Canada |

=== International Competition for Short Films ===
| English title | Original title | Director(s) | Production country |
|---|---|---|---|
| The Apple Doesn't Fall... | | Dean Wei | China |
| As a Cure | | Dorothea Sing Zhang | China, United Kingdom |
| The Blessing | | Caroline Poggi, Jonathan Vinel | France |
| The Bovine Comedy | | Ratchapoom Boonbunchachoke | France |
| City of Owls | | Zhenia Kazankina | France, Germany, Italy |
| Cul-de-Sac! | | Clyde Gates, Gabriel Sanson | Belgium, France |
| For the Opponents | | Federico Luis | Mexico, Chile, France, United Kingdom |
| Madrugada | | Sebastián Lojo | Guatemala, Turkey, United Kingdom |
| Nobody Barks | | Julia Coldwell Serra | Spain |
| Nobody Knows the World | | Roddy Dextre | Peru, Colombia, Spain, Mexico |
| Nothing Happens After Your Absence | | Ibrahim Omar | Sudan |
| Opera of Horror and Salvation | | Anastasia Veber | Germany, France, Belgium, Malta |
| Paper Life | | An Chu | Taiwan |
| Pithead | | Wannes Vanspauwen, Pol de Plecker | Belgium, France |
| Silent Voices | | Nadine Misong Jin | South Korea, United States |
| Stallion and a Crystal Ball | | Christian Avilés | Spain |
| Taxi Moto | | Gaël Kamilindi | France, Switzerland |
| Whispers of a Burning Scent | | Mo Harawe | Somalia, Austria, Germany |

=== National Competition for Short Films ===
| English title | Original title | Director(s) | Province |
|---|---|---|---|
| Almost Pink | Presque rose | Justine Prince | Canada |
| Amor Eterno | | Joshua Brad-Lee Garrido | Canada |
| And What Do the Pigs Think? | Et qu'en pensent les cochons? | Édith Jorisch | Canada |
| Are You Being Thanked Endlessly? | | Gulzar G | Canada |
| Between Late April and Early May | | Sophia Smith | Canada |
| Between Us | Entre nous | Félix Bouffard-Dumas | Canada |
| Burnt Toast | | Brielle Leblanc | Canada |
| The Comet | La Comète | Julie Charette | Canada |
| The Fading of Morning Light | | Jessamine Yu Fok | Canada |
| Footsteps on the Ceiling | | Giran Findlay Liu | Canada |
| Girl Found Dead | | Molly Shears | Canada |
| I Am the Heir | La Chaleur du dauphin | Lou Scamble | Canada |
| I See Myself in You | | Amreen Kullar | Canada |
| Imichki | | Yza Nouiga | Canada |
| It Comes in Waves | | Michael Petruzzelli | Canada |
| Leo on the Wire | | Kristina Wagenbauer | Canada |
| Lullaby from the Motherland | | Luvleen Hunjan | Canada, India |
| Pacific Spirit | | Antoine Bourges | Canada |
| Skinny Boots | Skinny Bottines | Romain F. Dubois | Canada |
| Till the Milk Runs Dry | | Kalainithan Kalaichelvan | Canada |
| Treasure Island | L'Île aux trésors | Miryam Charles | Canada |

=== The New Alchemists, Short Films ===
| English title | Original title | Director(s) | Production country |
|---|---|---|---|
| Acid City | | Will Freudenheim, Jack Wedge | United States |
| Another Earth | | Ben Russell | France |
| Ãsheghetam | | Saleh Kashefi | France, Switzerland, Iran |
| Au hasard | | Darren Dominique Heroux | Canada |
| Depuis des lunes... | | Patrick Bergeron | Canada |
| Display Nature | | Nicolas Gebbe | Germany |
| The End | | Niki Lindroth von Bahr | Sweden, Denmark, France |
| The Flesh of the Mountain | | Adam Piron | United States |
| Forever...Forever | | Johann Lurf | Austria |
| Ghazal-e Sorkh | | Maryam Tafakory | Iran, France, United Kingdom |
| Home Is Where the Heart Is | | Timothée Engasser | France |
| Invisible Harvests | | Stephanie Dudley | Canada |
| Kontrewers | | Zuza Banasińska | Poland, Netherlands, France |
| Like Moths to Light | | Gala Hernández López | Spain, Italy, France |
| Melk | | Filip Anthonissen | Belgium |
| Parie 6 | | Tomas Dessureault | Canada |
| Pure Reason | | Sofia Bohdanowicz | Canada |
| The Weary Hours of Two Lab Assistants | | Burak Çevik | Turkey, Canada, Germany, United Kingdom |
| The Wind, One Brilliant Day | | Ben Rivers | China, United Kingdom |

=== Pan-Canadian (RPCÉ) Student Short Film Competition ===
| English title | Original title | Director(s) | Institution |
|---|---|---|---|
| Bloom | | Émilio Perron | Canada |
| Combustion | | Arielle Legault | Canada |
| Crocodile Tears | | Gaoyuan Song | Canada |
| Dancing King | | Igor Kuna | Poland |
| La Danse des fées | | William Brunelle | Canada |
| La Danse du feu | | Indira Mitton | Canada |
| Le Dernier bouquet | | Meg Anh Bourgault | Canada |
| La Dose parfaite | | Arielle Legault | Canada |
| Entre deux bips | | Coralie Beaulieu, Maxime Doan | Canada |
| L'Entrevue | | Kané Beignet | Canada |
| Friendly Visitor | | Aryan Kurungode | Canada |
| Goldfish | | Jacqueline Subirana | Canada |
| La Grande cena de Fay | | Julien Mau | Canada |
| Il neige à Safad | | Jérémie Racicot-Haddad | Canada |
| Kamathupura Express | | Leon Korzynski | Poland, India |
| Long Decline Is Over | | Emery Sousa | Canada |
| Le Loup | | Clara St-Gelais de Ravinel, Romy Leblanc | Canada |
| Moutons | | Emmanuelle Fortier | Canada |
| New Year's Prayer | | Phương Weston Bui | Canada |
| Noël vert | | Julien Mau | Canada |
| Party Girl | | Alice Paradis | Canada |
| Pour que d'autres puissent vivre | | Xavier Lacasse | Canada |
| Princessy | | Franciszek Korolczuk | Poland |
| Read the Room | | Mya Groleau | Canada |
| Roomba et moi | | Delphine Vincent | Canada |
| Le Sang n'est rien | | Kané Beignet | Canada |
| Sels d'argent | | Maïlys Papineau | Canada |
| Signals | | Kasimir MacDougall | Canada |
| Silent Hunt | | Sandy Fleming | Canada |
| Teeth Don't Have Sex | | Anita Monteiro | Canada |
| You'll Feel Some Slight Pressure | | Mimi Huszti | Canada |

=== P'tits loups ===
Short film program of animation for children.

| English title | Original title | Director(s) | Production country |
|---|---|---|---|
| Dans l'ombre du héron | | Nicolas Bianco-Levrin | France |
| Emechiche, The Rebirth of White-Headed | | Juan Camilo González | Colombia, Argentina |
| Grounded | | Chris Callus | New Zealand |
| Imago | | Seungwook Jang | South Korea |
| J'ai trouvé une boîte | | Eric Montchaud | France |
| Jam and Wood | | Elena Walf | Germany, Croatia |
| Noctambules | | Lena von Döhren | Switzerland |
| Nutissimo | | Nicolas Bianco-Levrin | France |
| Piccolo Piccolo | | Marta Gennari | France, Switzerland |
| Prendre son souffle à deux mains | | Victor Papadimitriou | Canada |
| Spring | | Jiro Wataame | Japan |
| Star | | Kristýna Kučerová, Daniel Geisseder | Czech Republic |
| Trouvé! | | Juliette Baily | France, Belgium |
| Yuri Far Far Away | | Mariia Konopatova | Russia |
