= Iron Boy (film) =

2026 animated film by Louis Clichy

- Promotional poster
- French: Le Corset
- Directed by: Louis Clichy
- Written by: Louis Clichy; Franck Salomé
- Produced by: Nicolas de Rosanbo; Fabrice Delville
- Starring: Gary Clichy
- Edited by: Vincent Tricon
- Backgrounds by: Louis Clichy
- Color process: David Chantoiseau
- Production companies: Beside Production; RTBF; Eddy Cinéma; Regular Production; France 3; Auvergne-Rhône-Alpes Cinema
- Distributed by: KMBO
- Release dates: 19 May 2026 (Cannes); 14 October 2026 (France)
- Running time: 89 minutes
- Countries: France; Belgium
- Language: French

Iron Boy (French: Le Corset) is a 2026 animated coming-of-age film directed by Louis Clichy and co-written by Clichy and Franck Salomé. A co-production between France and Belgium, it follows the 11-year-old Christophe, who tries to live up to his rigid and distant father on their family farm.

The film premiered in the Un Certain Regard section of the 2026 Cannes Film Festival on 19 May 2026, where it won the Special Jury Prize. It was theatrically released in France by KMBO on 14 October.

== Synopsis ==
Eleven-year-old Christophe has always tried to be the son his silent, unyielding father needs on their struggling family farm. Then his body starts to betray him, collapsing without warning again and again, until a cure arrives that feels as strange as the illness itself: an iron corset, worn day and night, that pulls him out of the only life he has ever known.

Exiled from the farm, Christophe finds something he never expected there: music, mischief, and a friend who sees past the steel.

== Voice cast ==
- Gary Clichy as Christophe
- Rod Paradot as JB
- Brune Moulin as Clara
- Dimitri Colas as Jean
- Aurélie Vassort as Catherine
- Alexandre Astier as Michel
- Jean-Pascal Zadi as the Priest

== Production ==
=== Development ===
The Belgian companies Beside Production and RTBF and French companies Eddy Cinéma, Regular Production, France 3, and Auvergne-Rhône-Alpes Cinema produced the film.

Louis Clichy worked on WALL-E (2008) and Up (2009) before returning to France. He co-directed Asterix: The Mansions of the Gods (2014) and Asterix: The Secret of the Magic Potion (2018) with Alexandre Astier. Iron Boy originated as an animation by Clichy of a boy in a corset standing in a flat field. Iron Boy was the first film Clichy directed by himself. Clichy and Franck Salomé co-wrote the film.

Clichy noted that in French the word ferme (farm) comes from enfermé (locked up) and "implies a kind of withdrawal into oneself, like a brace". The film is set in the Beauce region of France. Clichy grew up on a farm in Beauce until he was ten and wore a back brace.

=== Casting ===
Gary Clichy, the son of Clichy, voiced the main character. Voice recordings were done with non-professional actors at a farm in Beauce in January 2024.

=== Animation ===
Eddy Studio, Caribara, Les Astronautes, Amopix, and L'enclume animated the film. The art style uses Chinese ink brushes and watercolor painting. Cécile Guillard, the film's art director, and Clichy conducted location scouting in Beauce.

=== Soundtrack ===
"Ouragan" by Princess Stéphanie of Monaco, and Gabriel Fauré's Requiem are used in the film. Clichy initially did not want to use a score. "Ouragan" was selected as Clichy's three sisters frequently listened to the song.

== Release ==
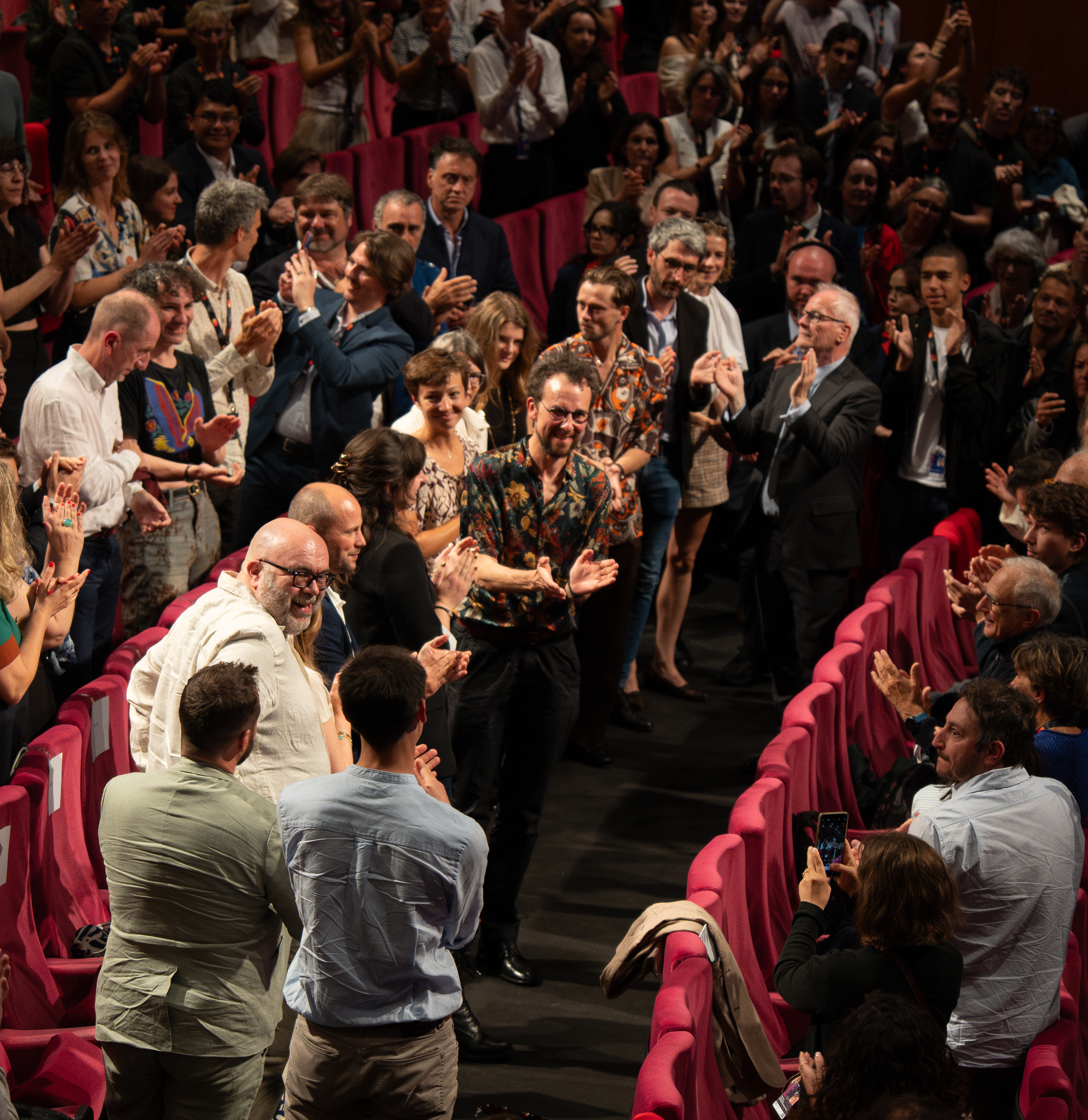
Louis Clichy and crew during the 2026 Cannes Film Festival

Iron Boy premiered in the Un Certain Regard section of the 2026 Cannes Film Festival on 19 May 2026. KMBO theatrically released the film in France on 14 October.

After its Cannes premiere, Sony Pictures Classics acquired the distribution rights for North and Latin America, India, and Southeast Asian television in a deal brokered by Nicolas Brigaud-Robert of Playtime.

It was screened at the Jerusalem Film Festival, and was selected for the 2026 Toronto International Film Festival. It will be also screened in the Spotlight Gala section of the 2026 New York Film Festival.

== Reception ==
=== Critical response ===
On review aggregator Rotten Tomatoes, the film holds an approval rating of 100% based on 20 reviews, with an average rating of 8.0/10. On Metacritic, the film has a weighted average score of 84 out of 100, based on 9 critics, indicating "universal acclaim".

Chase Hutchinson, writing for TheWrap, praised the complexity of the everyday characters in the film. Siddhant Adlakha, writing for Variety, noted that despite its simple plot the film felt "aurally spiritual" due to its soundtrack and was "both visually dazzling and deeply personal".

The composition and art style was praised by Brian Tallerico in his review for RogerEbert.com. Wendy Ide, writing for Screendaily, mentioned the hand-crafted stylistic choices as "the immediate selling point for the picture" and noted the film's darker tone covering economic pressures. Fabien Lemercier, writing for Cineuropa, praised the animation's "simple purity".

Jordan Mintzer compared Iron Boy to Persepolis (2007), My Life as a Courgette (2016), and I Lost My Body (2019) in his review for The Hollywood Reporter.

Jason Gorber of Next Best Picture called the film "emotionally rich, narratively confident, and visually compelling," describing it as "a moving story of childhood discovery." Clotilde Chinnici of FilmHounds described it as "unique and beautiful to watch on the big screen" and "a touching reflection on the power of music."

=== Accolades ===
Award	Ceremony date	Category	Recipient(s)	Result	Ref.
Cannes Film Festival	23 May 2026	Un Certain Regard Award	Louis Clichy	Nominated	
Cannes Film Festival	23 May 2026	Un Certain Regard Special Jury Prize	Louis Clichy	Won	
Annecy International Animation Film Festival	27 June 2026	Cristal Award for Best Feature	Iron Boy	Nominated	
Annecy International Animation Film Festival	27 June 2026	Jury Award	Iron Boy	Won	
Annecy International Animation Film Festival	27 June 2026	Gan Foundation Award for Distribution	Iron Boy	Won	
Annecy International Animation Film Festival	27 June 2026	Audience Award for a Feature Film	Iron Boy	Won	
Vancouver International Film Festival	13 October 2026	Audience Award, Panorama	Iron Boy	Won	
European Film Awards	16 January 2027	Best Animated Film	Iron Boy	Pending	

== Works cited ==
=== News ===
- "Le Corset (Fallen) de Louis Clichy / Eddy séduit le CNC". Catsuka. 22 October 2023. Archived from the original on 10 June 2025.
- "KMBO annonce de nouveaux films d'animation". Boxoffice Pro. 7 October 2025. Archived from the original on 31 May 2026.
- Adlakha, Siddhant (19 May 2026). "'Iron Boy' Review: A Gorgeously Hand-Painted Childhood Drama". Variety. Archived from the original on 28 May 2026.
- Chinnici, Clotilde (24 May 2026). "Iron Boy (Cannes Film Festival 2026) – Delightful Animation". FilmHounds. Archived from the original on 31 July 2026.
- Davis, Clayton (11 August 2026). "New York Film Festival Unveils Spotlight Slate With Tom McCarthy's 'A Statement,' Jonathan Glazer's 'Joy of Joys' and More". Variety. Archived from the original on 25 September 2026.
- Gorber, Jason (20 May 2026). ""IRON BOY"". NextBestPicture. Archived from the original on 30 July 2026.
- Hutchinson, Chase (19 May 2026). "'Iron Boy' Review: This Former Pixar Animator Has Made His Own Magical Hand-Drawn Movie". TheWrap. Archived from the original on 28 May 2026.
- Ide, Wendy (19 June 2026). "'Iron Boy' review: French animator Louis Clichy's first feature is striking, personal study of a challenging childhood". Screen International. Archived from the original on 15 July 2026.
- Lang, Jamie (26 May 2026). "Louis Clichy's 'Iron Boy' Wins Special Jury Prize At Animation-Packed Cannes". Cartoon Brew. Archived from the original on 28 May 2026.
- Lemercier, Fabien (19 May 2026). "Review: Iron Boy". Cineuropa. Archived from the original on 30 July 2026.
- Mintzer, Jordan (22 May 2026). "'Iron Boy' Review: A Moving Coming-of-Age Cartoon Follows an 11-Year-Old Struggling to Stand Up Straight in the French Countryside". The Hollywood Reporter. Archived from the original on 28 May 2026.
- Spake, Nick (27 June 2026). "2026 Annecy Film Festival The Violinist, Iron Boy & More Among Winners". CartoonContender. Archived from the original on 16 July 2026.
- Tallerico, Brian (20 May 2026). "Cannes 2026: Iron Boy, Tangles, Lucy Lost". RogerEbert.com. Archived from the original on 28 May 2026.
- Taylor, Drew (21 May 2026). "Cannes Day 10: 'Victorian Psycho' Shocks, 'Iron Boy' Finds a Home". TheWrap. Archived from the original on 28 May 2026.
- Wiseman, Andreas (21 May 2026). "Sony Classics Buys North America & Multiple International Markets On Cannes Animated Film 'Iron Boy'". Deadline Hollywood. Archived from the original on 28 May 2026.
- Zahed, Ramin (5 August 2026). "Toronto Intl. Film Festival to Spotlight a Record Eight Animated Features". Animation Magazine. Archived from the original on 7 August 2026.

=== Web ===
- "Iron Boy". Jerusalem Film Festival. Archived from the original on 21 July 2026.
- "Iron Boy". Annecy International Animation Film Festival. Archived from the original on 21 July 2026.
- "Iron Boy English Press Kit" (PDF). Cannes Film Festival. Archived (PDF) from the original on 29 May 2026.
- "Iron Boy (Le Corset)". Cineuropa. 26 May 2026. Archived from the original on 28 May 2026.
- Orciari, Veronica (26 May 2026). "Louis Clichy • Director of Iron Boy". Cineuropa. Archived from the original on 28 May 2026.
- Pavard, Charlotte (19 May 2026). "Le Corset (Iron Boy), the gaze of Louis Clichy". Cannes Film Festival. Archived from the original on 28 May 2026.
