= François.e =

2026 Canadian comedy film

- Film poster
- Directed by: Jean-François Asselin
- Written by: Gabrielle Boulianne-Tremblay; Jean-François Léger
- Produced by: Louis-Philippe Drolet; Louis Morissette
- Starring: Louis Morissette; Pascale Drevillon; Geneviève Schmidt
- Cinematography: Sara Mishara
- Edited by: Simon Sauvé
- Music by: Mathieu Vanasse
- Production company: KO24
- Distributed by: Les Films Opale; Entracte Films
- Release date: June 22, 2026 (Monument-National)
- Running time: 91 minutes
- Country: Canada
- Language: French

François.e is a Canadian comedy film, directed by Jean-François Asselin and released in 2026. The film stars Louis Morissette as François, a struggling screenwriter who falsely claims to be transgender in order to get funding for his latest television project, and is forced to keep up the ruse when his pitch is accepted, only to be drawn into moral complications when he actually develops a sincere friendship with Sarah (Pascale Drevillon), an actual trans woman he hires as a cowriter.

The cast also includes Geneviève Schmidt, Robin Aubert, Rachel Graton, Cassandra Latreille, Martin-David Peters, Mounia Zahzam, Naila Louidort and Irdens Exantus in supporting roles.

The screenplay was written by Gabrielle Boulianne-Tremblay and Jean-François Léger. The film's production was announced in spring 2025.

The film premiered on June 22, 2026, at the Monument-National theatre in Montreal, before opening commercially on July 1.
