= Alexandre Astier =

French writer, director, editor and actor

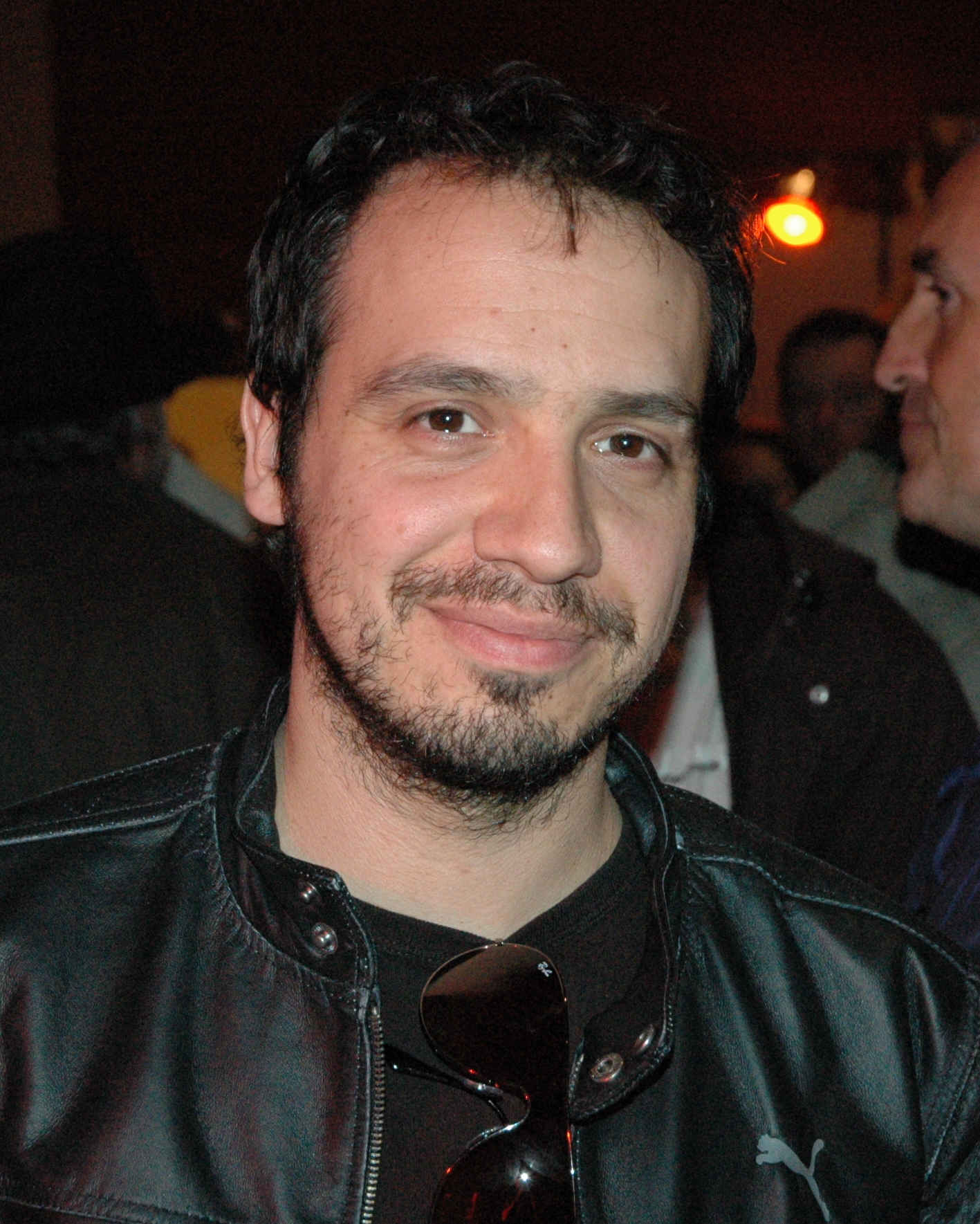
- Born: Alexandre Astier; 16 June 1974 (age 52); Lyon, France
- Occupation: Actor

Alexandre Astier (born 16 June 1974) is a French writer, director, editor, scriptwriter, humorist, actor and composer.

Astier is most known as the creator, director, writer, editor, composer, and lead actor of the French television series Kaamelott, in which he also plays King Arthur.

== Life and career ==
Alexandre Astier was born in Lyon on June 16, 1974, to Joëlle Sevilla and Lionnel Astier, both actors and producers mostly in Lyon's theatre scene.

Alexandre Astier studied music at the conservatory and at the American School of Modern Music of Paris. He also studied acting and screenwriting.

Four of Astier's seven children have featured in Kaamelott, and both his parents are main characters in the series. His daughters Ariane and Jeanne Astier play respectively Mehben and Mehgan, the daughters of Karadoc and Maevanwi (in the episodes Pupi and Exiles). His son Neil (who also appears as Karadoc and Mevanwi's son in Pupi) plays young Arthur in the season Book V, and in the final scene of Book VI. His son Ethan plays Arthur's dream heir in Book V. Moreover, the mother of his first five children, Anne-Gaëlle Daval, is head of the costume designs on Kaamelott and the short film Dies Irae.

In 2012, he plays Johann Sebastian Bach in his humorous show "Que ma joie demeure !" at the theater.

In 2014, his comic show "L'Exoconférence" begins at the theater in September.

Passionate of technologies, he confirms in 2018 on twitter, that Kaamelott's film adaptation has been written with a bepo keyboard on a raspberry pi, running Wordgrinder text-editor software.

He also owns a castle in Ardèche area, where he can store lot of his music instruments into a specific room.

=== Debut at the theatre ===
Alexandre Astier first got attention from the Lyon's public thanks to the play Le Jour du froment. He also acted in Nous crions grâce, a play written and directed by Jacques Chambon, to whom he gave the role of Merlin in Kaamelott.

=== Cinema ===
In 2001, he was the co-screenwriter and the songwriter of the short movies Soyons sport and Un soupçon fondé sur quelque chose de gras.

In 2002 he was the director of Dies Irae, a 14-minute short movie that is also the first draft of the Kaamelott TV show.

In 2006, he featured in Hey Good Looking!, a French movie by Lisa Azuelos. The same year, he appeared in Asterix at the Olympic Games by Frédéric Forestier and Thomas Langmann, and in Home Sweet Home by Didier Le Pêcheur.

In 2009, he played the role of the ex-husband of Sophie Marceau in LOL (Laughing Out Loud), another comedy by Lisa Azuelos.

In 2012, he presented his first feature film as a director, David et Madame Hansen, in which he played the main protagonist alongside Isabelle Adjani.

In 2014, he was the co-director and the screenwriter of Asterix: The Mansions of the Gods.

In 2015, he appeared in the film All Three of Us, directed by Kheiron.

In 2018, he wrote an original screenplay for a new Asterix movie: Asterix: The Secret of the Magic Potion. Like Asterix: The Mansions of the Gods, he co-directed it with Louis Clichy.

In 2025, he plays the role of a drunken shrink in the second season of Bref. He had already appeared as a cameo in the first season.

=== Kaamelott ===
Alexandre Astier became famous as the writer, director and actor in the TV show he produced. Kaamelott is inspired by the story of King Arthur and the Knights of the Round Table. This humorous series is broadcast on the French channel M6. The episodes lasted three and a half minutes until 2007. Then, the format changed to seven minutes and finally reached fifty-five minutes per episode in the last season Book VI.

He also composes the music of the series. He has the ambition to extend the TV show to the cinema as a trilogy, but not before 2012, since Alexandre Astier plans to work as a director on another movie before launching Kaamelott on the big screen.

In June 2010, invited on the set of the show "J'irai LOLer sur vos tombes", he unveiled his project to publish a series of graphic novels titled Kaamelott Resistance as a transition between the TV format and the future cinema films.

== Filmography ==
=== Film ===
Year	Title	Role	Notes
2001	Un soupçon fondé sur quelque chose de gras	N/A	Short
2001	Soyons sport	Francis	Short
2002	Dies Irae	King Arthur	Short
2004	Anaconda	Vincent	Short
2006	Hey Good Looking!	Gilles	
2007	Recrue d'essence	Maxime Roux	Short
2008	Asterix at the Olympic Games	Mordicus	Also dialogue writer
2008	Coluche, l'histoire d'un mec	Reiser	
2008	Home Sweet Home	Joubert	
2009	LOL (Laughing Out Loud)	Alain	
2009	Zygomatiques	Dr. Paul Lamarrade	Short
2011	Les Aventures de Philibert, capitaine puceau	Clotindre d'Artois	
2012	David et Madame Hansen	David	Also director, writer, producer and editor
2013	Pop Redemption	Traffic Police Chief	
2014	Quantum Love	Eric	
2014	All Three of Us	The Shah of Iran	
2014	Asterix: The Mansion of the Gods	Centurion Somniferus (voice)	Also writer
2014	14 millions de cris	Father	Short
2015	What We Do in the Shadows	Vladislav the Poker	French dub
2018	Asterix: The Secret of the Magic Potion	Centurion Somniferus (voice)	Also writer
2021	Kaamelott: The First Chapter	King Arthur	Also director, writer, producer and editor
2025	Kaamelott: The Second Chapter Part 1	King Arthur	Also director, writer, producer and editor
2026	Laughing Out Loud 2.0	Alain	
2026	Iron Boy	Michel (voice)	
2026	Minions & Monsters	Max (voice)	French dub

=== Television ===
Year	Title	Role	Notes
2001	Belle Grand-Mère 2 : La Trattoria	Marcello	TV movie
2002	Lyon Police Spécial	Café Owner	Episode: "Apprivoisement"
2005–2009	Kaamelott	King Arthur	TV series Main role, 446 episodes Director; Writer; Editor
2007	Elie Annonce Semoun	Eric Reptile	Miniseries; Direct-to-video
2007	Off Prime	Himself	3 episodes
2008	Mademoiselle	WorldWide Company C.E.O	Episode: "Episode 13"
2008	14-18, le bruit et la fureur	Narrator	Documentary
2009	Hero Corp	Araignée Man	2 episodes
2010	La Commanderie	Inquisitor Robert Matemale	Episode: "L'arrivée du Duc d'Anjou"
2011	Le Front Populaire, à nous la vie !	Narrator	Documentary
2012, 2025	Bref	Undisguised Party Guest/Therapist	5 episodes
2012	Adventure Time	Prince Gumball (voice)	French dub
2013	Scènes de ménages	José's Biker Friend	Episode: "Entre amis"
2013	La télé commande	Televiewer	1 episode
2015	Einstein et la relativité générale, une histoire singulière	Albert Einstein (voice)	Documentary
2022	Le Grand Restaurant : La guerre de l'étoile	Georges Michalon	TV movie
2025	Asterix and Obelix: The Big Fight	Unhygienix (voice)	Netflix mini-series

=== Video games ===
Year	Title	Role	Notes
2017	Mass Effect Andromeda	Lieutenant August Bradley	French dub

=== Web series ===
Year	Title	Role	Notes
2012–2013	Le Golden Show	Cosette/M.Bison/Alan Mysterious	3 episodes

== See also ==
- Kaamelott
