= Arnold Lim =

Canadian film director and screenwriter

Arnold Lim is a Canadian film director and screenwriter from Victoria, British Columbia, whose debut feature film All-In Madonna premiered in 2020.

Born in Edmonton, Alberta, to immigrant parents from South Korea, and raised in Blue River, British Columbia, Lim began his career as a photojournalist and videographer, including working as a photo manager for the Olympic Games and for the Black Press network of community newspapers.

He began directing short films in the 2010s, including a short version of All-In Madonna in 2018, before receiving a Telefilm Canada grant to fund production of the full feature version, which premiered in the Borsos Competition program at the 2020 Whistler Film Festival.

He followed up in 2022 with the semi-autobiographical short drama film My Name Is Arnold, which won the Audience Favourite award for short films at the 2023 Victoria Film Festival, and in 2024 with Obscura, which won the Directors Guild of Canada's Greenlight award for emerging British Columbia filmmakers, and the Leo Awards for Best Short Drama and Best Screenplay.

His second feature film, The Bryce Lee Story, went into production in 2025, and premiered at the 2026 Vancouver International Film Festival.

== Filmography ==
- Bye Bye Birdie - 2012
- The Blood Line - 2013
- No Connection - 2015
- The Girl - 2016
- Watching Something Private - 2017
- All-In Madonna - 2018 (short version), 2020 (feature version)
- My Name Is Arnold - 2022
- Obscura - 2024
- The Bryce Lee Story - 2026
