= A Secret Heart =

2026 French documentary film directed by Tom Fontenille

- French: Cœur secret
- Directed by: Tom Fontenille
- Written by: Tom Fontenille; Valentine Bonnaz
- Produced by: Martin Bertier; Helen Olive
- Starring: Lilou Fontenille
- Cinematography: Tom Fontenille
- Edited by: Marie Bottois
- Music by: Camille Delafon
- Production company: 5 à 7 Films
- Distributed by: Météore Films
- Release date: 14 May 2026 (Cannes)
- Running time: 88 minutes
- Country: France
- Language: French

A Secret Heart (French: Cœur secret) is a 2026 French documentary film directed by Tom Fontenille. It follows the filmmaker relationship with his own father, Patrice, following the passing of his wife Yolande.

The film had its world premiere at the ACID section of the 2026 Cannes Film Festival on 14 May, where it was nominated for the Queer Palm and the L'Œil d'or.

== Premise ==
Tom Fontenille documents his strained relationship with his father Patrice, who initially becomes withdrawn and uncommunicative following the death of his wife Yolande; however, after Fontenille unexpectedly discovers the secret cross-dressing that his father has been trying to hide, their relationship is transformed and deepened as Patrice embarks on the process of coming out as Lilou, a transgender woman.

== Release ==
The film premiered in the ACID stream at the 2026 Cannes Film Festival, where it was in contention for the Queer Palm and the L'Œil d'or.

It was screened at the 2026 Festival du nouveau cinéma, where it was the inaugural winner of the Queer Louve award.
