= Strong Son =

2026 Canadian drama film

- Directed by: Ian Bawa
- Written by: Ian Bawa
- Produced by: Fritz Adelman; Markus Henkel; Ian Bawa
- Starring: Mandeep Sodhi; Amrit Parbhakar
- Cinematography: Markus Henkel
- Edited by: Ian Bawa; Markus Henkel; Ted Husband
- Music by: Milos Mitrovic; Max Walter; Amine Bouzaher
- Production companies: Farpoint Films; Thin Stuff Productions
- Distributed by: Farpoint Distribution
- Release date: September 14, 2026 (TIFF)
- Running time: 88 minutes
- Country: Canada
- Languages: English; Punjabi

Strong Son is a Canadian drama film, directed by Ian Bawa and released in 2026. The film stars Mandeep Sodhi as Harvinder “Harvey” Singh, an Indo-Canadian bodybuilder who moves back home to become a caregiver for his father Jagdeep (Amrit Parbhakar) due to his father's declining health.

The cast also includes Michaela Kurimsky, Yuvraj Singh Dhesi, Erik Athavale, Onalee Ames, Suzanne Pringle, Kristian Jordan, Susan Loewen and Josh Pinette in supporting roles.

== Production ==
Bawa's full-length directorial debut, the film is an expansion of his short film of the same name, which premiered at the 2020 Toronto International Film Festival. Based in part on his real-life relationship with his own father Jagdeep, the short version directly starred his father as the fictional dad.

Bawa subsequently released the short films My Son Went Quiet and The Best in 2024, with both films also drawing on Bawa's real-life relationship with his father.

The feature version went into production in Winnipeg, Manitoba, in 2025.

== Release ==
The film premiered in the Discovery program at the 2026 Toronto International Film Festival.

== Awards ==
At the 2026 Vancouver International Film Festival, it received an honorable mention for the Summit Award for Best Canadian Film.

The film is also slated to screen in the Borsos Competition program at the 2026 Whistler Film Festival.
