= So Long Pluto =

- French: Au revoir Pluton
- Directed by: Sarianne Cormier
- Written by: Sarianne Cormier
- Produced by: Gabrielle Tougas-Fréchette; Guillaume Vasseur
- Starring: Sarah-Jeanne Audet; Raphaëlle Morissette; Catherine-Audrey Volcy
- Cinematography: Simran Dewan
- Edited by: Sophie Farkas Bolla
- Music by: Peter Venne; Yves Morin
- Production company: Voyelles Films
- Distributed by: Maison 4:3
- Release date: March 3, 2026 (FIFEM)
- Running time: 97 minutes
- Country: Canada
- Language: French

So Long Pluto (French: Au revoir Pluton is a Canadian musical comedy film, directed by Sarianne Cormier and released in 2026. Inspired by the debate about the planetary status of Pluto, the film stars Sarah-Jeanne Audet as Pluto, a young girl who aspires to join her school's musical theatre troupe.

The cast also includes Raphaëlle Morissette as Neptune, Catherine-Audrey Volcy as Earth, Zakary Belharbi as Ceres and Matthew Rankin as Clyde Tombaugh, as well as Théo Beaudoin-Graton, Zélia Bernard, Océane Kitura Bohémier-Tootoo, Miya Capuano, Kathleen Fortin, Sharon Ibgui, Dominika Konevych, Guillaume Lambert, Aksel Leblanc, Romane Lefebvre, Rosanne Lefebvre, Alexis Mailhot-Chevrier, Gabriella Mejia Perez and Yves Morin in supporting roles.

Cormier's directorial debut, the film premiered at the Montreal International Children's Film Festival on March 3, 2026, before going into commercial release on March 27.

At FIFEM, the film received a special mention from the jury for the Best Film award, and Audet won the Union des Artistes award for Best Performance.
