= Lifeline (2026 film) =

2026 Canadian film

- Directed by: Ilhan Abdullahi
- Written by: Ilhan Abdullahi
- Produced by: Mimi Dejene
- Starring: Muna Abdullahi; Hanad Abdi
- Cinematography: Alexander Torres
- Edited by: Jasleen Kaur
- Music by: Josh Santos; Sharma Boy; Faarow
- Production companies: Constant Departure Studios; Star & Sky Productions
- Release date: September 17, 2026 (Mosquers)
- Running time: 77 minutes
- Country: Canada
- Languages: English; Somali

Lifeline is a Canadian drama film, written and directed by Ilhan Abdullahi and released in 2026. The film stars Muna Abdulahi as Ibtisam, a Somali Canadian youth worker who is assigned to assist teen basketball player Hassan (Hanad Abdi) after he is falsely accused of a serious crime, becoming drawn into the Somalian crime underworld she tried to leave behind.

The cast also includes Oscar Rudecindo, Elmi Rashid Elmi, Jason Benson, Saman Hasan, Carrie Hunter, Bilal Salad, Mayran Kalah, Mohamed Abdi, Farhan Abdileyl, Farhan Abdullahi, Abdishacur Ali, Omar Ali, Yahya Farah, Esrom Gebregergies, Deqa Mohamed and Hanad Nur in supporting roles.

The film, Abdullahi's full-length directorial debut, is an expansion of her 2024 short film of the same title, and was inspired in part by Ilhan Abdullahi's own experiences as a social worker in refugee resettlement cases. It was shot in Vancouver, Surrey and Seattle in fall 2025.

The film had its world premiere on September 17, 2026, at the Mosquers Film Festival in Edmonton, followed by a screening at the 2026 Vancouver International Film Festival.

At the 2026 Reelworld Film Festival, Muna Abdulahi won the award for Outstanding Feature Film Actress.
