= The Bryce Lee Story =

2026 Canadian drama film

- Directed by: Arnold Lim
- Written by: Arnold Lim; Kyle D'Odorico; Connor Gaston; Mo Bradley
- Produced by: Arnold Lim; Lynne Lee
- Starring: Rickie Wang; Cordelia Chao; Benny Wang
- Cinematography: Stirling Bancroft
- Release date: October 5, 2026 (VIFF)
- Running time: 94 minutes
- Country: Canada
- Language: English

The Bryce Lee Story is a Canadian drama film, written and directed by Arnold Lim and released in 2026. The film stars Rickie Wang as Bryce Lee, a teenage boy living on Vancouver Island after having recently immigrated to Canada from his native China, who sets off an unexpected chain of events when he falsely claims to be related to martial arts film icon Bruce Lee in an effort to fit in at his new school.

The cast also includes Cordelia Chao, Benny Wang, Luke Hubler-McManus, Alix West Lefler, Bijou Brattston, Aias Dalman, Tim Zhang, April Amber Telek and Johnson Phan in supporting roles.

The film was shot in fall 2025 in Victoria, British Columbia.

It premiered at the 2026 Vancouver International Film Festival, and is slated to screen in the Borsos Competition program at the 2026 Whistler Film Festival.
