= Aksel Leblanc =

Canadian actor

Aksel LeBlanc is a Canadian actor from Quebec. He is most noted for his performance in the 2024 film Phoenixes (Phénix), for which he received a Prix Iris nomination for Revelation of the Year at the 27th Quebec Cinema Awards in 2025.

He previously appeared in small supporting roles in the films Death to the Bikini! (À mort le bikini!) and Echo to Delta (Écho à Delta), and the television series Corbeaux, In Memoriam and Indéfendable. In 2026 he appeared in the short film Skinny Boots (Skinny Bottines), and the feature film So Long Pluto (Au revoir Pluton).
