= Ian Bawa =

Canadian filmmaker

Ian Singh Bawa is a Canadian filmmaker from Winnipeg, Manitoba.

A graduate of the film studies program at the University of Winnipeg and the Director's Lab at the Canadian Film Centre, he began his filmmaking career as a director of short films and episodes of television documentary series, becoming best known for his 2020 short film Strong Son. Based on his own relationship with his father Jagdeep, Strong Son starred his father as a dad giving life and relationship advice to his son (Mandeep Sodhi) while the son is exercising in a gym. However, his father died a few weeks after the film's premiere at the 2020 Toronto International Film Festival.

He was subsequently co-director with Quan Luong of the 2022 documentary film Seeking Fire.

In 2024 he released two short films, My Son Went Quiet and The Best. The Best featured Sodhi reprising his bodybuilder character from Strong Son, again working out in the gym as he tries to cope with his grief over his father's death, while My Son Went Quiet was inspired by Bawa's relationship with his father following the earlier death of his mother. My Son Went Quiet won the award for Outstanding Short Film at the 2024 Reelworld Film Festival.

His narrative feature debut, an expansion of Strong Son centred on the protagonist becoming his father's primary caregiver as the older man's health declines, entered production in February 2025. It premiered in the Discovery program at the 2026 Toronto International Film Festival, and received an honorable mention for the Summit Award for Best Canadian Film at the 2026 Vancouver International Film Festival.

A feature expansion of My Son Went Quiet is also in development.
