= Zorga Qaunaq =

Canadian Inuk actress and artist

- Qaunaq in 2026

Zorga Qaunaq is a Canadian actress and artist, originally from Igloolik, Nunavut and based in Ottawa, Ontario. She is most noted for her regular role as Millie in the sitcom North of North, for which she and the other core cast members won the Canadian Screen Award for Best Ensemble Performance in a Comedy Series at the 14th Canadian Screen Awards in 2026.

In 2025, it was announced that Qaunaq would star, alongside her North of North co-star Anna Lambe, in Nyla Innuksuk's thriller film In the Heart of the South. In 2026 she appeared in the drama film In Alaska.

In addition to her acting, Qaunaq also works as an Inuit language educator, and as a traditional Inuit tattoo artist. She is in development with Aviaq Johnston on Inuks on Vacation, a feature film which would mark her debut as a director.

== Personal life ==
Qaunaq is pansexual.
