= Clubfoot (film) =

2026 Canadian drama film

- Directed by: Nathan Donovan
- Written by: Nathan Donovan
- Produced by: Nathan Donovan; Dylan Rhys Howard
- Starring: Ryley-Ray Levasseur; Daelyn James; Adam Levasseur
- Cinematography: Rico Moran
- Edited by: Kurt Walker; Nathan Donovan
- Production company: Manufactured Imagery
- Release date: October 4, 2026 (VIFF)
- Running time: 94 minutes
- Country: Canada
- Language: English

Clubfoot is a Canadian drama film, written and directed by Nathan Donovan and released in 2026. The film stars Ryley-Ray Levasseur as Kristian, an adopted boy from a troubled home who, with his friend Echo (Daelyn James), abducts and violently assaults Honoré (Adam Levasseur), another adopted boy they meet at the library.

The cast also includes Sean Bradley, Jacob Dutton, Gerald Levasseur, Kyra Levasseur, Savannah Levasseur and Marcie Schultz in supporting roles.

The film was based in part on Donovan's experiences witnessing his father's work in the troubled foster care system, and Ryley-Ray and Adam Levasseur are Donovan's real-life adoptive brothers.

The film premiered at the 2026 Vancouver International Film Festival.

== Awards ==
The film was named to the initial longlist for the 2026 Jean-Marc Vallée DGC Discovery Award.

At VIFF, Donovan received an honorable mention for the Horizon Award for emerging Canadian directors. It was the winner of the National Competition at the 2026 Festival du nouveau cinéma.
