= Gabrielle Boulianne-Tremblay =

Canadian actress and writer

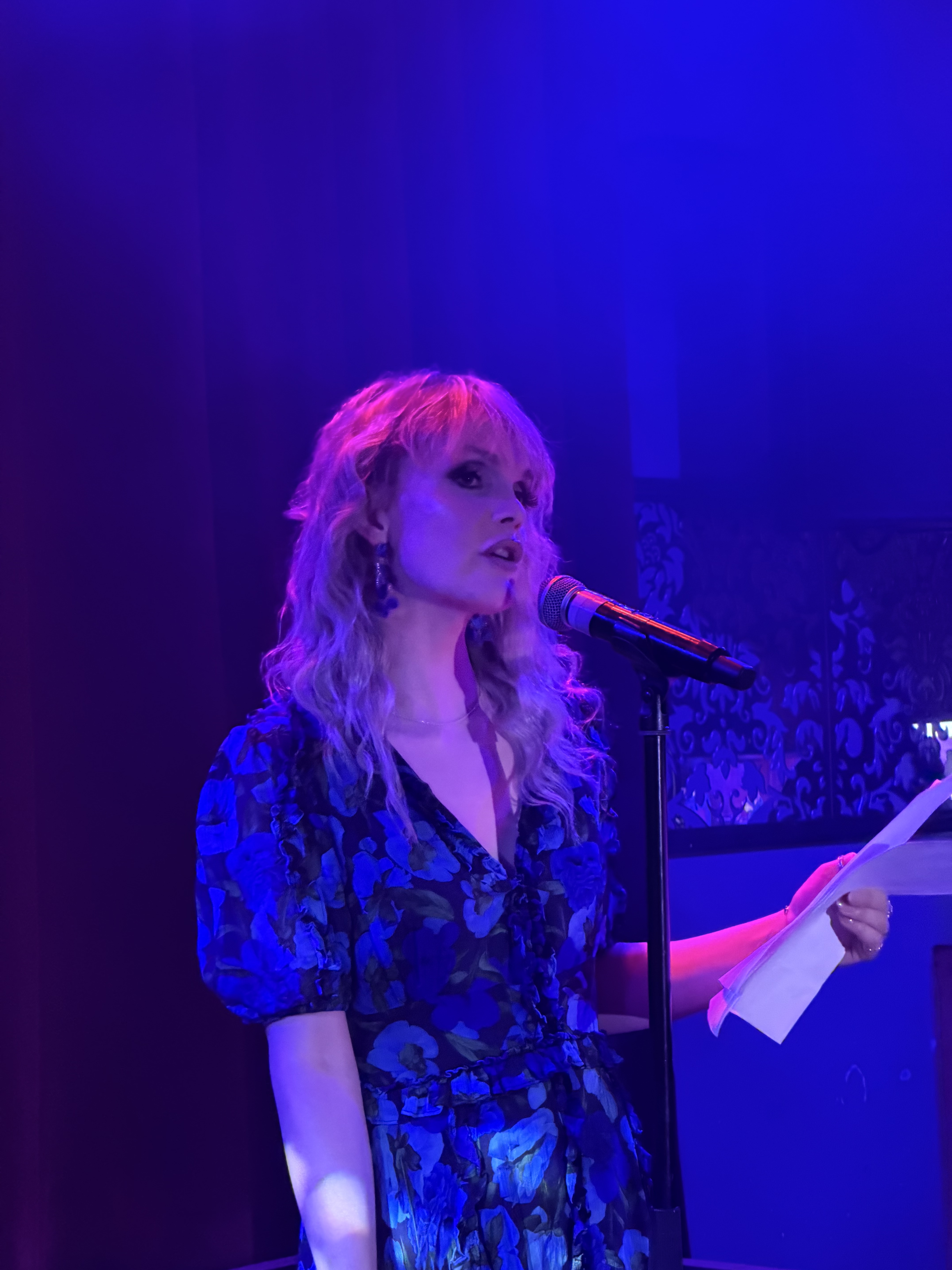
- Boulianne-Tremblay in 2026
- Born: July 27, 1990 (age 36); La Malbaie, Quebec
- Writing career
- Notable works: Those Who Make Revolution Halfway Only Dig Their Own Graves, La fille d'elle-même, La fille de la foudre

Gabrielle Boulianne-Tremblay (born July 27, 1990, in La Malbaie, Quebec), formerly credited as Gabrielle Tremblay, is a Canadian actress and writer, who received a Canadian Screen Award nomination as Best Supporting Actress at the 5th Canadian Screen Awards for her performance as Klas Batalo in the 2016 film Those Who Make Revolution Halfway Only Dig Their Own Graves (Ceux qui font les révolutions à moitié n'ont fait que se creuser un tombeau).

She came out as transgender in 2012. She was the first transgender woman ever nominated for an acting award at the Canadian Screen Awards or their predecessor Genie Awards. Those Who Make Revolution was her first feature film role, although she previously appeared in short films and documentaries.

Her poetry collection Le ventre des volcans was published by Les Éditions de l'étoile de mer in 2015.

In 2021 she published the autobiographical novel La fille d'elle-même. Dandelion Daughter, an English translation of the novel by Eli Tareq El Bechelany-Lynch, was published by Esplanade Books in 2023, and was a finalist for the Ferro-Grumley Award for LGBT literature in 2024.

In 2025 she served on the jury for the Dayne Ogilvie Prize.

Her screenplay François.e, a comedy about a cisgender man who pretends to be transgender to further his career before confronting the morality of his actions when he meets and befriends a genuine transgender woman, was directed by Jean-François Asselin, and released theatrically in 2026.

In October 2026, she served on the jury for the Queer Louve award at the 2026 Festival du nouveau cinéma, alongside filmmaker Eli Jean Tahchi and drag queen Sami Landri.
