= In the Heart of the South =

2026 Canadian thriller film

- Directed by: Nyla Innuksuk
- Written by: Nyla Innuksuk; Ryan Cavan
- Produced by: Jennifer Kawaja; Laura Perlmutter
- Starring: Anna Lambe; Zorga Qaunaq
- Cinematography: Ann Tipper
- Edited by: Hugh Elchuk
- Music by: PIQSIQ
- Production companies: Sphere Media; Mixtape VR
- Distributed by: Elevation Pictures
- Release date: September 10, 2026 (TIFF)
- Running time: 94 minutes
- Country: Canada
- Language: English

In the Heart of the South is a Canadian thriller film, written and directed by Nyla Innuksuk and released in 2026. The film stars Anna Lambe as Yura Ivalu, an Inuk artist who is building her career in Southern Ontario far from her home and upbringing in Nunavut, but who begins to spiral out of control after she is unexpectedly reunited with her childhood friend Sesi Ilupaalik (Zorga Qaunaq).

The cast also includes Tara Nicodemo, Alexander Nunez, Star Slade, Martha Burns and Sera-Lys McArthur in supporting roles.

== Production ==
The film was shot in Hamilton, Ontario, in summer 2025.

== Distribution ==
The film premiered in the Platform Prize program at the 2026 Toronto International Film Festival.

It is slated to screen in the National Competition at the 2026 Festival du nouveau cinéma.

== Critical response ==
Pat Mullen of That Shelf wrote that "In the Heart of the South wickedly reflects the reality of the contemporary arts scene. Yura’s struggle illustrates how the scene pays lip service to Indigenous artists and other minority groups, but ultimately exploits their work to perpetuate the status quo. It treats trauma as currency but sets artists up to fail while gatekeepers cash in on their experiences. And yet in doing so, South reveals a filmmaker who emerges stronger after enduring the bullshit of the arts scene. Innuksuk has more tools to fulfill the vision here. The reality she gives is one the scene really needs. And a frequently entertaining one to boot."

== Awards ==
The film was shortlisted for the Jean-Marc Vallée DGC Discovery Award at the Directors Guild of Canada awards in 2026.

At the 2026 Vancouver International Film Festival, Innuksuk won the Horizon Award for Best Emerging Canadian Filmmaker. The film is also slated to screen in the Borsos Competition program at the 2026 Whistler Film Festival.
