= Jim Queen =

2026 animated film by Nicolas Athane and Marco Nguyen

- Theatrical release poster
- French: Jim Queen à la recherche de la Chloroqueer
- Directed by: Nicolas Athane; Marco Nguyen
- Written by: Simon Balteaux; Marco Nguyen; Nicolas Athane; Brice Chevillard
- Produced by: David Alric; Arthur Delabays
- Starring: Alex Ramirès; Jérémy Gillet
- Edited by: Ivy Buirette
- Music by: Mathieu Rosenzwig; Benjamin Nakache
- Production companies: Bobbypills; uMedia
- Distributed by: The Jokers Films
- Release dates: 18 May 2026 (Cannes); 17 June 2026 (France)
- Running time: 85 minutes
- Countries: France; Belgium
- Language: French

Jim Queen (French: Jim Queen à la recherche de la Chloroqueer) is a 2026 adult animated comedy film co-directed by Nicolas Athané and Marco Nguyen (in their directorial debut), co-written with Simon Balteaux and Brice Chevillard. A co-production of France and Belgium, it follows the outbreak of a virus in Paris that turns gay men into heterosexuals.

The film had its world premiere in the Midnight Screenings section of the 2026 Cannes Film Festival on 18 May, where it was nominated for the Caméra d'Or and the Queer Palm. Distributed by The Jokers Films, it was released theatrically in France on 17 June. The film received generally positive reviews from critics.

== Synopsis ==
Jim, a gay icon in Paris, contracts a virus that turns homosexual men heterosexual and embarks with Lucien on a quest to find a cure and save the LGBTQIA+ community.

== Voice cast ==
=== French ===
- Alex Ramirès as Jim Parfait
- Jérémy Gillet as Lucien
- Shirley Souagnon as Nina
- François Sagat as Pavel
- Harald Marlot as Glamydia
- Elisabeth Wiener as Christine Bayer
- Alexandre Brik as Robear
- Philippe Katerine as The Prostate
- La Briochée

=== English dubbing ===
- Jordan Firstman as Jim Perfect
- Matteo Lane as Lucien
- Nicole Byer as Nina
- John Cameron Mitchell as Pavel
- Bob the Drag Queen as Glamydia
- Wendie Malick as Christine Bayer

== Production ==
The film was made with funding from Eurimages, three regional grants including one from New Aquitaine, and a crowdfunding campaign.

== Reception ==
On review aggregator website Rotten Tomatoes, the film holds an approval rating of 96% based on 25 reviews, with an average rating of 7.1/10. Metacritic, which uses a weighted average, assigned the film a score of 62 out of 100, based on 8 critics, indicating "generally favorable reviews".

At the 30th Fantasia International Film Festival, the film won the Silver Audience Award for animated films. At the 2026 Vancouver International Film Festival, the film won the Audience Award for the Altered States program.
