= L'Autre (2026 film) =

2026 Canadian comedy film

- Directed by: Alexandre Franchi
- Written by: Alexandre Franchi; Simon Lavoie
- Produced by: Ménaïc Raoul; Alexandre Franchi
- Starring: Pierre-Yves Cardinal; Bilel Chegrani; Karine Gonthier-Hyndman; Nahéma Ricci
- Cinematography: Steve Asselin
- Edited by: Hubert Hayaud
- Music by: Gabriel Scotti
- Production company: Les Productions Cool Raoul
- Distributed by: Maison 4:3
- Release date: September 12, 2026 (TIFF)
- Running time: 98 minutes
- Country: Canada
- Language: French

L'Autre is a Canadian comedy thriller film, directed by Alexandre Franchi and released in 2026. The film stars Pierre-Yves Cardinal as Stan, a man recuperating in the hospital from cancer surgery, whose stir craziness from being confined to a hospital room is exacerbated when Darius (Bilel Chegrani) is admitted to the room's other bed after a shooting, becoming the focus of Stan's increasingly wild paranoia.

The cast also includes Karine Gonthier-Hyndman as Stan's girlfriend Bénédicte and Nahéma Ricci as Bénédicte's sister Fleur, as well as Marc Messier, Benoît Gouin and Maxime Genois in supporting roles.

== Distribution ==
The film premiered in the Centrepiece program at the 2026 Toronto International Film Festival. It was subsequently screened in the Features Canada program at the 2026 Cinéfest Sudbury International Film Festival, and is slated to screen as the closing film of the 2026 Festival du nouveau cinéma.

== Critical response ==
Courtney Small of That Shelf wrote that "similar to a child picking up momentum on a swing, L'Autre aims high but never fully touches the perfect blend of social commentary and thrills it reaches for. In its best moments, Franchi’s film reveals in a dark and silly humour, including a running gag that captures the intrusive nature of hospital etiquette for patients seeking a bit of bedpan privacy, that allows its critical medicine to go down easier. Couple this with plenty of quick edits and fantastical elements, and the audience vividly feels the sense of delirium in Stan’s off-kilter state."
