= Queer Louve =

The Queer Louve ("Queer Wolf") is a Canadian film award, presented to a film selected by the award's jury as the best film with LGBTQ themes screening at the annual Festival du nouveau cinéma.

The award was presented for the first time at the 2026 festival.

== History ==
Prior to the creation of the Queer Louve, the FNC and Fierté Montréal launched an award for LGBTQ films in the program at the 2023 Festival du nouveau cinéma.

The Queer Louve was launched in 2026 as a collaboration between the FNC and the Queer Palm, the Cannes Film Festival's independent award for LGBTQ films. It is the second award created in partnership with the Queer Palm committee at a non-Cannes film festival, following the creation of the Best Queer Short Award at the Clermont-Ferrand International Short Film Festival in 2022.

== Winners and nominees ==
=== Fierté Montréal ===
Year	Title	Director(s)	Ref
2023	Power Alley (Levante)	Lillah Halla	
2023	The Bride	Myriam U. Birara	
2024	I'm Not Everything I Want to Be (Jeste nejsem, kým chci být)	Klára Tasovská	
2025	A Useful Ghost	Ratchapoom Boonbunchachoke	

=== Queer Louve ===
Year	Title	Director(s)	Ref
2026	A Secret Heart (Cœur Secret)	Tom Fontenille	
2026	At Night	Beatrice Gibson	
2026	Barbara Forever	Brydie O'Connor	
2026	Bitter Christmas (Amarga navidad)	Pedro Almodóvar	
2026	La bola negra	Javier Calvo, Javier Ambrossi	
2026	Club Kid	Jordan Firstman	
2026	Elephants in the Fog (तिनीहरू)	Abinash Bikram Shah	
2026	I Plant My Hand in the Garden	Boris Hadžija, Hoda Taheri	
2026	Objet a	Ann Oren	
2026	Two Mountains Weighing Down My Chest	Viv Li	

== Juries ==
- 2026: Eli Jean Tahchi, Gabrielle Boulianne-Tremblay, Sami Landri
