= Two Mountains Weighing Down My Chest =

2026 documentary film directed by Viv Li

- Directed by: Viv Li
- Written by: Viv Li
- Produced by: Daniela Dieterich; Martin Roelly; Ümit Uludag; Erik Winkler
- Starring: Viv Li
- Cinematography: Viv Li; Janis Mazuch
- Edited by: Christoph Bargfrede
- Production companies: 100% Film; CORSO Film und Fernsehproduktion; Das kleine Fernsehspiel
- Distributed by: Film Kino Text; Mediawan Rights
- Release date: 13 February 2026 (Berlin)
- Running time: 85 minutes
- Countries: Germany; Netherlands
- Languages: English; German; Mandarin

Two Mountains Weighing Down My Chest is a 2026 documentary film directed by Viv Li. A coproduction of Germany and the Netherlands, the film is a personal essay reflecting on Li's own experiences as a Chinese expatriate living in Berlin, contrasting the tensions between the traditional expectations of her family in China and the unstructured frenzy of her place in the LGBTQ and artistic communities in Berlin.

== Production ==
The film was inspired in part by Li's complicated relationship with her own gender; although born as a girl, her parents raised her like a boy due to China's one-child policy, leading to confusion when she reached puberty and began to grow breasts.

Prior to its release, the film was screened as a work in progress in the Cannes Docs program at the 2025 Marché du Film, where it won the Alphapanda Award.

== Release ==
The film premiered in the Panorama Dokumente stream at the 76th Berlin International Film Festival, followed by screenings at Visions du Réel and the New Directors/New Films Festival.

It screened in the International Competition at the 2026 Festival du nouveau cinéma, where it won the Daniel Langlois Innovation Award, and was also eligible for the Queer Louve.
