= Skinny Boots =

2026 Canadian short film by Romain F. Dubois

- French: Skinny Bottines
- Directed by: Romain F. Dubois
- Written by: Romain F. Dubois
- Produced by: Antoine Rivard-Nolin; Guillaume Laurin; Romain F. Dubois
- Starring: Dominick Rustam; Aksel Leblanc
- Cinematography: Ménad Kesraoui
- Edited by: Romain F. Dubois; Guillaume Marin
- Music by: Hubert Tanguay-Labrosse
- Production company: Couronne Nord
- Release date: May 17, 2026 (Cannes)
- Running time: 19 minutes
- Country: Canada
- Language: French

Skinny Boots (French: Skinny Bottines) is a 2026 Canadian comedy short film written, produced and directed by Romain F. Dubois. The film stars Dominick Rustam and Aksel Leblanc as Dan and Pinpin, two troublemaking cousins who are getting up to mischief, including pickpocketing in downtown Montreal. The cast also includes France Pilotte, Tiffany Montambault, Juliette Gariépy, Mattis Savard-Verhoeven and Antoine Nicolas.

The film had its world premiere at the Critics' Week short film competition of the 2026 Cannes Film Festival on May 17, where it won the Discovery Prize for Short Film.

== Cast ==
- Dominick Rustam as Dan
- Aksel Leblanc as Pinpin
- France Pilotte
- Tiffany Montambault
- Juliette Gariépy
- Mattis Savard-Verhoeven
- Antoine Nicolas

== Production ==
Cinematographer Ménad Kesraoui shot the film on 16mm.

== Accolades ==
Award	Date of ceremony	Category	Recipient	Result	Ref.
Cannes Film Festival	2026	Critics' Week Sony Discovery Prize for Short Film	Romain F. Dubois	Won	
Festival du nouveau cinéma	2026	Audience Choice, National Competition for Short Films	Romain F. Dubois	Won	
