= Asterix: The Secret of the Magic Potion =

- French theatrical release poster
- Astérix: Le Secret de la Potion Magique
- Directed by: Louis Clichy; Alexandre Astier
- Screenplay by: Alexandre Astier; Louis Clichy
- Story by: Alexandre Astier
- Based on: Asterix by René Goscinny; Albert Uderzo
- Produced by: Philippe Bony
- Starring: Christian Clavier; Guillaume Briat; Bernard Alane; Daniel Mesguich; Lévanah Solomon
- Cinematography: David Dulac
- Edited by: Bertrand Maillard
- Music by: Philippe Rombi
- Production companies: M6 Group; Mikros Image
- Distributed by: SND Groupe M6
- Release date: 5 December 2018
- Running time: 87 minutes
- Countries: France; Belgium
- Language: French
- Budget: €33.7 million
- Box office: $73.2 million

Asterix: The Secret of the Magic Potion (French: Astérix: Le Secret de la Potion Magique) is a 2018 French-Belgian animated adventure comedy film co-directed by Alexandre Astier and Louis Clichy. A sequel to 2014's Asterix: The Mansions of the Gods, the screenplay by Astier is based on the Asterix comic book characters created by René Goscinny and Albert Uderzo. This is the first Asterix production not to feature Roger Carel as the voice of Asterix, due to his retirement in 2014 and later death in 2020. Asterix is instead voiced by Christian Clavier, who previously played the character in Asterix and Obelix vs. Caesar and Asterix & Obelix: Mission Cleopatra. The film was released in France on 5 December 2018 by SND. Icon Film Distribution released the film's English dub in Australia starting 30 May 2019.

== Plot ==
In the forest outside the village of indomitable Gauls, the druid Getafix falls from a tree, breaking his foot. Worried about his mortality, he resolves to find a successor to inherit the secret recipe of his magic potion which imbues the user with superhuman strength. He is escorted to a meeting of his fellow druids by Asterix and Obelix, while a creative young village girl named Pectine has stowed away in his cauldron. The meeting is disrupted by Getafix's nemesis, Sulfurix (Demonix in the English dub), who wreaks havoc before being chased away. Getafix then travels throughout Gaul to meet with aspiring young druids in his quest for a successor. He is accompanied by Chief Vitalstatistix and the village's other men, with the exception of Cacofonix, who remains behind with the village women and a reserve supply of magic potion to repel attacks by Roman legionaries.

Sulfurix offers Julius Caesar the chance to secure the recipe and is assisted by Senator Tomcrus, who plots to attack the village until it runs out of potion. Sulfurix recruits the unwitting Teleferix (Cholerix), a promising young druid, and teaches him magic in order to impress Getafix. Asterix uncovers their plot but is captured before he can warn the others. Sulfurix burns down the sacred forest of the druids, while Getafix chooses Teleferix as his successor. News soon reaches the Gauls that Cacofonix and the women have run out of magic potion.

Getafix has Obelix, Pectine and Teleferix help him source most of the ingredients for the potion. However, Sulfurix steals them and freezes Obelix with a spell. Getafix returns home for his reserve ingredients, but finds them squandered by his fellow druids vying to make their own concoctions. Sulfurix orders Teleferix to make the potion, but a key ingredient is missing. Sulfurix inadvertently augments the incomplete mixture with his fire magic, consumes the resultant potion and attacks both the Gauls and the Romans.

Pectine brings the leftover ingredients to Getafix, who instructs her to make the potion and reveals the missing ingredient is a drop of Magic Potion from a previous batch, secretly stored with the handle of his golden sickle. Getafix then battles Sulfurix and is saved by Asterix and Obelix. Sulfurix is punched out of the village, but lands in a puddle of potion that transforms him into a giant. The Romans and the Gauls join forces to combat him and drink the potion made by Pectine. Getafix uses his own magic to form the Roman legionaries into a giant centaur 'robot', which is guided by Obelix and defeats Sulfurix.

With the danger over, the Romans retreat and Getafix advises Teleferix to return home to restart his training. As the Gauls celebrate with a feast, Getafix tells Pectine that she will eventually forget the secret of the magic potion, but the young girl states that she just can't get the recipe out of her head. It is hinted that Getafix may be considering to make Pectine his successor one day if she never forgets.

== Cast ==
Character	Original	English Dub
Asterix	Christian Clavier	Ken Kramer
Obelix	Guillaume Briat	C. Ernst Harth
Getafix	Bernard Alane	John Innes
Demonix	Daniel Mesguich	Michael Shepherd
Pectin	Lévanah Solomon	Fleur Delahunty
Cholerix	Alex Lutz	Michael Adamthwaite
Somniferus	Alexandre Astier	Jason Simpson
Marcus Ubiquitus	Elie Semoun	Sam Vincent (Tofungus)
Atmospherix	Gerard Hernandez	Alec Willows
Fulliautomatix	Lionnel Astier	Scott McNeil
Unhygienix	François Morel	Jason Simpson
Impedimenta	Florence Foresti	Saffron Henderson
Senator Tomcrus	Olivier Saladin	Andrew Cownden
Cacofonix	Arnaud Léonard	Andrew Cownden
Vitalstatistix	Serge Papagalli	Don Brown
Julius Monotonus	Franck Pitiot	Michael Adamthwaite (Humerus)
Breadstix	Alexandre Astier	Jason Simpson
Geriatrix	Laurent Morteau	Ron Halder
Julius Caesar	Philippe Morier-Genoud	Mark Oliver
Cakemix	François Raison	Brian Drummond
Phantasmagorix	Patrick Bonnel	Howard Siegel
Fotovoltahix	Nicky Naudé	Richard Newman
Cassius Ceramix	Patrick Pineau	Brian Dobson
Captain Redbeard	Éric Bougnon	Aaron Chapman
Pegleg	Daniel Laloux	Richard Newman
Bacteria	Joëlle Sevilla	Riley Kramer
Mrs. Geriatrix	Luna Karys	Rebecca Husain
Brothers Jugglestix	Louis Clichy	C. Ernst Harth
Brothers Jugglestix	Romain Segaud	C. Ernst Harth
Virgindaikirix	Unknown	Jason Simpson
Blodimérix	Alexandre Astier	Unknown
Aepyornis	Nicky Naudé	Unknown
Vitroceramix	François Raison	Unknown
Loustix	Ethan Astier	Unknown
Bazunix	Dominique Bastien	Unknown
Caustix	Dominique Bastien	Unknown
Colchix	Yoann Blanc	Unknown
Minix	Max Brunner	Unknown
Spherix	Simon Brunner	Unknown
Cubix	Simon Brunner	Unknown
Zurix	Jacques Chambon	Unknown
Magnetix	Louis Clichy	Unknown
Bitnix	Christophe Fluder	Unknown
Pequeño Galo	Valeria Lamm	Unknown
Druid	Antoine Lelandais	Unknown
Grotadefrix	François Rollin	Unknown
Tektonix	Romain Segaud	Unknown

== Reception ==
=== Box office ===
The film was released on 5 December 2018 across France, taking more than $2 million in revenue on the opening Wednesday and close to $7 million through Sunday night.

== See also ==
- List of Asterix films
