= I Plant My Hand in the Garden =

2026 drama film by Boris Hadžija and Hoda Taheri

- Directed by: Boris Hadžija; Hoda Taheri
- Written by: Boris Hadžija; Hoda Taheri
- Produced by: Maximilian Feldkamp; Hoda Taheri; Boris Hadžija; Čarna Vučinić; Ena Bajraktarević
- Starring: Boris Hadžija; Hoda Taheri; Branka Hadžija; Jahandokht Taheri; Hadi Khanjanpour
- Cinematography: Vytautas Katkus
- Edited by: Boris Hadžija
- Production companies: DFFB; Cruising; NAKED; Mala Productions
- Release date: 3 September 2026 (Venice)
- Running time: 83 minutes
- Countries: Germany; Serbia; United States
- Languages: Serbian; Farsi; German; English

I Plant my Hand in the Garden is a 2026 autobiographical-drama film written and directed by Boris Hadžija and Hoda Taheri, marking the duo's debut feature. A co-production between Germany, Serbia, and the United States, it follows fictional versions of Hadžija and Taheri, as they decided to raise a child.

The film had its world premiere in the Giornate degli Autori section of the 83rd Venice International Film Festival on 3 September 2026, where it was nominated for the Queer Lion.

== Plot ==
Hoda, an Iranian refugee living in Berlin, is pregnant and in love with Boris, a queer gay man from Serbia. Together, they decide to marry and raise the child, imagining a future built on their own terms. As they prepare for the wedding and enter more deeply into each other’s worlds, their relationship is seriously tested by all the red tape and their families’ expectations and histories that neither of them can leave behind. Surrounded by relatives, memories and inherited ideas of love and parenthood, Hoda and Boris begin to question the roles they are about to take on. What starts as a plan to become a family gradually turns into a more intimate and uncertain question: can they reinvent what it means to be a couple without losing what brought them together?.

== Cast ==
- Boris Hadžija as Boris
- Hoda Taheri as Hoda
- Branka Hadžija
- Jahandokht Taheri
- Hadi Khanjanpour
- Igor Hadžija
- Hosna Taheri

== Production ==
A co-production between Germany, Serbia and the United States, I Plant My Hand in the Garden is produced by the DFFB (Germany), Crusing (Germany), NAKED (Serbia) and Mala Productions (USA).

The film's development was supported by Creative Europe - MEDIA and the project was among the finalists of the Locarno Residency 2023 of the Locarno Film Festival.

The film marks Hadžija and Taheri's first feature, following their 'Mother' trilogy, composed by the short films Mother Prays All Day Long (2022), As If Mother Cried That Night (2023) and Mother is a Natural Sinner (2024), all of which premiered at the Locarno Film Festival in three consecutive years.

== Release ==
I Plant My Hand in the Garden debuted in the 23rd Giornate degli Autori competition at the 83rd Venice International Film Festival on 3 September 2026. The film also competed for the Queer Lion. Square Eyes boarded the film's worldwide sales rights. The film will have its Serbian premiere at the Belgrade Auteur Film Festival in November 2026.

== Reception ==
Edin Custo from Eye For Film described the film as bold, not everyone's cup of tea, but also "food for thought [...] for those who turn to cinema for more than entertainment and like to keep thinking afterwards". Vittoria Scarpa from Cineuropa noted how the "juxtaposition of the everyday and the uncanny is one of the most interesting traits" of the film, and "it’s through this constant oscillation that the film manages to turn a private story into a broader reflection on the ways we build our relationships". Marc van de Klashorst from International Cinephile Society lauded the film, giving it a 4.5/5 rating and calling it "a confounding, thought-provoking experience that feels like an unsolvable puzzle that’s not meant to be solved" and "a film more to be experienced than dissected".

It won the Louve d'Or for Best Film in the International Competition at the 2026 Festival du nouveau cinéma, and was also eligible for the Queer Louve.
