= Faraz Shariat =

Shariat in 2026

Faraz Shariat is a German film director. He directed No Hard Feelings and Prosecution.
