= The Story of Documentary Film =

2026 documentary by Mark Cousins

The Story of Documentary Film is a 2026 16-chapter documentary film series which explores the history of documentary film. It was directed by Mark Cousins. The first chapter premiered at the 2026 Sundance Film Festival.
