= Asterix: The Mansions of the Gods =

2014 French animated film

- Theatrical release poster
- Astérix – Le Domaine des Dieux
- Directed by: Louis Clichy
- Screenplay by: Alexandre Astier
- Based on: The Mansions of the Gods by René Goscinny; Albert Uderzo
- Produced by: Philippe Bony; Thomas Valentin
- Starring: Roger Carel; Lorànt Deutsch; Laurent Lafitte; Guillaume Briat
- Edited by: Soline Guyonneau
- Music by: Philippe Rombi
- Production companies: M6 Films; Belvision; Grid Animation
- Distributed by: SND Groupe M6
- Release date: 26 November 2014
- Running time: 85 minutes
- Countries: France; Belgium
- Language: French
- Budget: €31 million
- Box office: $51.3 million

Asterix: The Mansions of the Gods (French: Astérix – Le Domaine des Dieux), also titled Asterix and Obelix: Mansion of the Gods, is a 2014 French-Belgian animated adventure comedy film directed by Louis Clichy with a story written and co-directed by Alexandre Astier. The film features the voices of Roger Carel, Guillaume Briat, Lionnel Astier, Serge Papagalli, and Florence Foresti. The film was Carel's last film before his retirement in 2014 and later death in 2020. It was the first Asterix film animated in 3D.

The film was theatrically released on 26 November 2014 by SND Films in France across 696 movie theatres. It received generally favourable reviews and grossed over $51 million on a €31 million budget. It received an IFMCA Award nomination for Best Original Score for an Animated Feature Film. Asterix: The Mansions of the Gods was released on DVD, VOD and Blu-ray on 9 June 2015, by M6 Vidéo.

== Plot ==
Frustrated with the Gauls' ongoing rebellion, Julius Caesar devises a new scheme to conquer them: the construction of a city of luxury apartments dubbed “The Mansions Of The Gods” in the forest near the Gauls' village as a means to absorb them into Roman civilization.

During a boar hunt, Asterix and Obelix discover the Mansions’ construction site. Project leader and architect Squaronthehypotenus and a Roman legion garrison commanded by Centurion Somniferus order the slaves to deforest the surrounding area. Asterix and Obelix attempt to counteract the Romans’ efforts by using magic acorns from Getafix the druid, which instantly sprout into full trees upon planting.

Upon hearing the frustrated Squaronthehypotunus threatening to work the slaves to death, Asterix and Obelix invade the Roman camp to free the slaves and provide them with the Gauls' magic potion as a means to escape. However this backfires when the slaves instead use the potions powers to rapidly speedup construction progress, as well as barter for the same pay as the legionaries, along with their freedom and apartments for each of them upon completion. The legionaries also go on strike for similar reasons upon hearing about it.

The Gauls prepare to attack and demolish the Mansions, but discover it to already be populated by Roman civilians. Realizing that they can't harm civilians, they return to the village to plan how to make them leave. Meanwhile, Anonymus, Dulcia and Mischiefus, a family from Rome, are denied their apartments given to them in a lottery due to lacking documents. Upon encountering and befriending Obelix and Dogmatix in the forest, the Gauls reluctantly agree to temporarily accommodate the Roman family into their village, while Obelix and Mischiefus become friends.

Asterix, Obelix and Getafix try numerous methods to make the civilians leave, from causing heavy rain and noise pollution, to trying to create a noxious stench, only for these plans to fail by the civilians embracing these as a natural part of life in Brittany. The Roman civilians also begin shopping in the Gauls' village, causing an escalating price war over fish and 'antique' weaponry. Asterix, appalled with what the village has become, leaves with Obelix, Getafix, Dogmatix and Cacofonix to get their own apartment at the Mansions. While Squaronthehypotenus is reluctant to allow their stay, Senator Prospectus allows them to stay as part of Caesar's plan.

Caesar then enacts the next phase of the plan by offering free apartments to the Gauls. In another attempt to make the Roman civilians leave, Asterix has Cacofonix to cause noise pollution by singing deafeningly loud outside the mansions. This almost works until the rest of the Gauls shows up to silence Cacofonix and move into their new apartments.

With the village abandoned, Caesar enacts the final stage of his plan, ordering the village's destruction. The legion, however refuses to cooperate with Getafix and Obelix still at large. Getafix, Mischiefus and Dogmatix are captured and held in the Mansions' lobby, while Obelix faints from hunger next to the Roman legion while searching for the three, and is thrown into a chamber beneath the Mansions.

Asterix awakens the next day to find the village being besieged, and the Gauls are brought along to watch the village's destruction. The Gauls keep the Romans at bay by pretending to still possess the magic potion, while Asterix makes his way to the Mansions. Meeting with Anonymus and Dulcia, they free Getafix, Dogmatix, and Mischiefus and escape into the apartments, to start brewing the magic potion. The Gauls chase the Romans back to the Mansions, only to be captured once the Romans realise their deception. Asterix attempts to rescue them, but ends up in a poor condition from consuming an incomplete magic potion.

With Asterix incapacitated and the Gauls cornered, Caesar and Prospectus arrive to declare victory over the Gauls, until Obelix rises from underground, revived after consuming food from an arrival banquet disposed into his chamber. The Gauls get their magic potion and defeat the Romans in battle, and demand Caesar take the civilians back to Rome, finally leading to the demolition of the Mansions of the Gods. The Gauls celebrate their victory with their traditional banquet atop the ruins of the mansions. Back in Rome, Anonymus and Mischiefus humiliate Caesar by throwing one of Getafix's instant growth acorns into his podium at the Colosseum, leaving him dangling from a tree branch.

== Cast ==
Character	Original	English Dub	
Character	Original	Canadian Version (2015)	U.K. Version (2016)
Asterix	Roger Carel	Ken Kramer	Jack Whitehall
Dogmatix	Roger Carel	Not dubbed	Not dubbed
Obelix	Guillaume Briat	C. Ernst Harth	Nick Frost
Centurion Somniferus	Alexandre Astier	Jason Simpson	Greg Davies
Vitalstatistix	Serge Papagalli	Don Brown	Matt Berry
Dulcia	Géraldine Nakache	Tabitha St. Germain	Catherine Tate
Anonymus	Artus de Penguern	Alan Marriott	Harry Enfield
Unhygienix	François Morel	Jason Simpson	Richard McCourt
Fulliautomatix	Lionnel Astier	Scott McNeil	Dominic Wood
Julius Caesar	Philippe Morier-Genoud	Mark Oliver	Jim Broadbent
Squaronthehypotenus	Lorànt Deutsch	Richard Ian Cox	Richard Ian Cox
Flaturtha	Laurent Lafitte	Donny Lucas	Donny Lucas
Senator Prospectus	Alain Chabat	Colin Murdock	Colin Murdock
Marcus Ubiquitus	Elie Semoun	Sam Vincent (Tofungus)	Sam Vincent (Tofungus)
Getafix	Bernard Alane	John Innes	John Innes
Givusabonus	Florian Gazan	Scott McNeil	Jon Clifford
Impedimenta	Florence Foresti	Saffron Henderson	Elizabeth Bower
Cacofonix	Arnaud Leonard	Alan Marriott	Alan Marriott
Mischiefus	Oscar Pauwels	Jack Gessner	Hannah Beth Jackson
Bacteria	Joëlle Sevilla	Riley Kramer	Elizabeth Bower
Geriatrix	Laurent Morteau	Ron Halder	Ron Halder
Senator Pestiferus	Brice Fournier	Ron Halder	Ron Halder
Senator Fastidius	Christophe Bourseiller	Andrew Toth	Andrew Toth
Senator Consensus	Olivier Saladin	Marco Soriano	Marco Soriano
Julius Monotonus	Franck Pitiot	Michael Adamthwaite (Humerus)	Michael Adamthwaite (Humerus)
Radius	Sébastien Lalanne	Andrew Toth	Andrew Toth
Doctor	Benjamin Gauthier	John Innes	John Innes
Goth Gladiator	Pascal Demolon	Scott McNeil	Scott McNeil
Black Numidian Gladiator	Baptiste Lecaplain	Sam Vincent	Sam Vincent
Roman Ladies	Virginia Anderson	Jennifer Cameron	Jennifer Cameron
Roman Ladies	Pauline Moingeon-Vallès	Saffron Henderson	Saffron Henderson
Serius	Damien Gillard	Marco Soriano	Marco Soriano
Mosaic Artist	Sébastien Lalanne	Sam Vincent	Sam Vincent
Guide	Benjamin Gauthier	Andrew Toth	Andrew Toth
Cluelus	Louis Clichy	Andrew Toth	Andrew Toth
Roman Brutes	Damien Gillard	Marco Soriano	Marco Soriano
Roman Brutes	Brice Fournier	Michael Adamthwaite	Michael Adamthwaite
Roman	Damien Gillard	Sam Vincent	Sam Vincent
Civilian	Brice Fournier	Marco Soriano	Marco Soriano
Matrons	Virginia Anderson	Tabitha St. Germain	Unknown
Matrons	Joëlle Sevilla	Unknown	Elizabeth Bower

== Critical response and box office ==
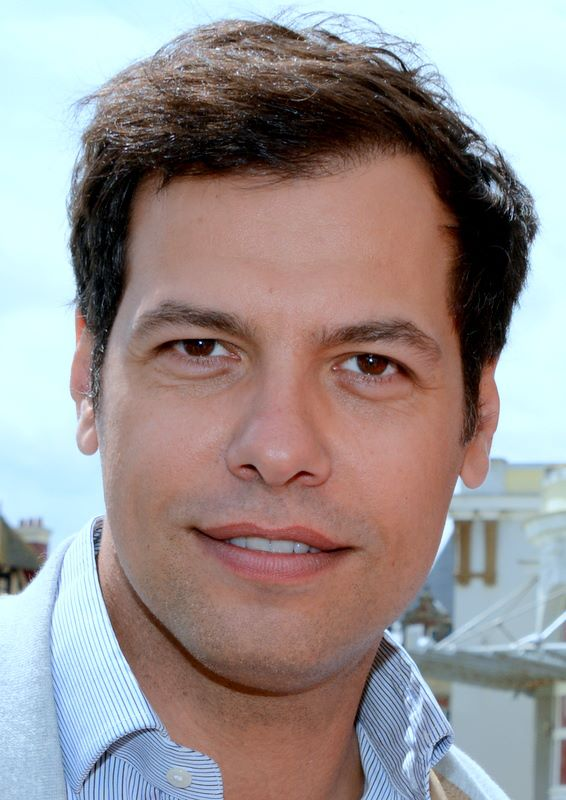
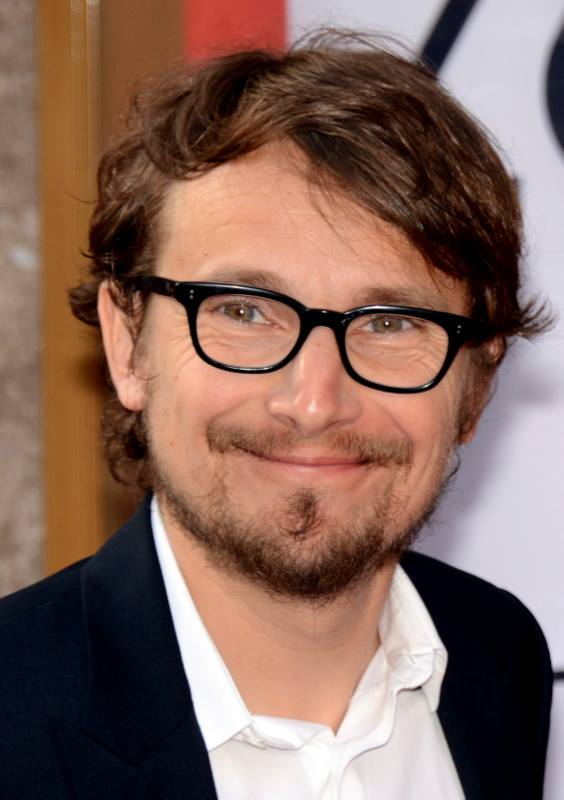
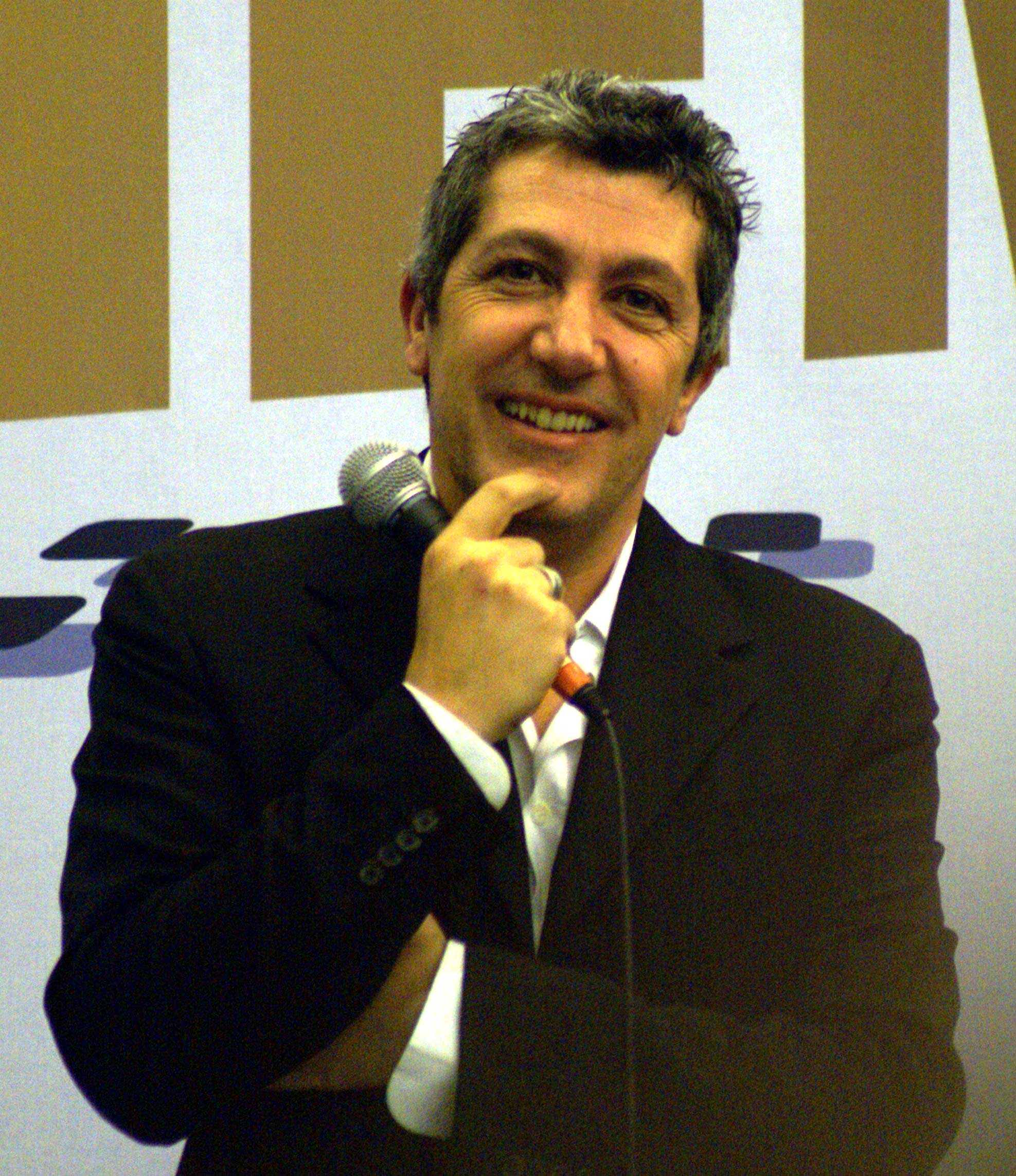
Laurent Lafitte, Lorànt Deutsch and Alain Chabat were praised by critics for their performances.

The film was released on 26 November 2014 in France across 696 theatres and earned $7.64 million on its opening week from nearly 780,000 admissions placing at No. 1 at the box office ahead of Hollywood blockbuster films The Hunger Games: Mockingjay – Part 1 and Interstellar which were in their second and fourth weeks respectively. The film's opening weekend is also the third highest of 2014 in France. Its opening weekend outperformed other animated movies' openings of Frozen, Tangled, Monsters, Inc., Cars and The Lego Movie. Jordan Mintzer of The Hollywood Reporter said, "Astier and Clichy manage to make the material at once enjoyable and meaningful, while also providing a series of slick, streamlined visuals that never overstuff the screens."

== Awards and nominations ==
Award	Category	Nominee	Result
IFMCA Award	Best Original Score for an Animated Feature Film	Philippe Rombi	Nominated

== Home media ==
Asterix: The Mansions of the Gods was released on DVD, VOD and Blu-ray on 9 June 2015 by M6 Vidéo.

== Sequel ==
In 2018, a sequel was released titled Asterix: The Secret of the Magic Potion.

== See also ==
- List of Asterix films
