= Alexandre Franchi =

Canadian film director from Quebec

Alexandre Franchi is a Canadian film director from Quebec. He is most noted for his 2009 film The Wild Hunt, which won the award for Best Canadian First Feature Film at the 2009 Toronto International Film Festival and was named to the annual Canada's Top Ten list of the year's best Canadian films in 2009.

He previously directed the short films Chimère, Fata Morgana, Terminal Venus, Love Junket, and Troll Concerto.

His second feature film, Happy Face, was released in 2018. He followed up in 2026 with L'Autre, which premiered in the Centrepiece program at the 2026 Toronto International Film Festival.
