= Ali Cherri =

Lebanese Artist

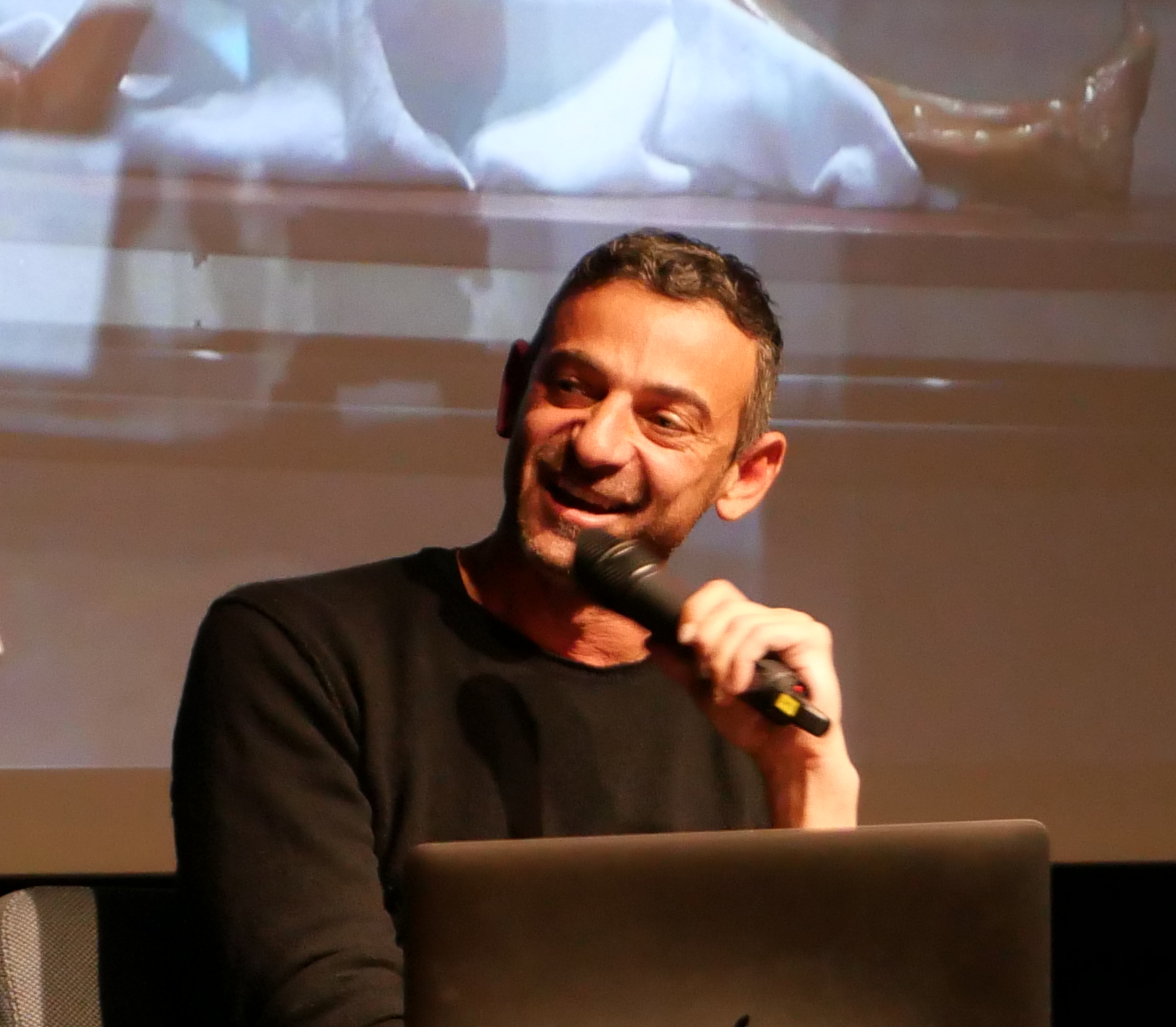
- Cherri in 2023 at the FIFDH in Geneva, Switzerland.
- Born: 1976 (age 49–50)
- Known for: Video, Installation
- Website: http://www.alicherri.com/

Ali Cherri (born 1976) is a Lebanese contemporary artist and film maker based in Paris. His practice incorporates video, installation, and mixed media, with a focus on themes related to archaeology, cultural heritage, and the natural environment in Lebanon and the wider Middle East.

== Early life and education ==
Ali Cherri was born in Beirut. He grew up and did his school in Beirut. After graduating he moved to Amsterdam and then Paris for his Masters degree. Mostly based in Paris, he now works between Beirut and Paris.

== Work ==
Cherri uses found and original footage in single- and multi-channel video installations.

=== Major exhibitions ===
In 2026, Cherri presented his short film "The Sentinel" in a special screening at Critics’ Week during the Cannes Film Festival.

Jeu de Paume, Paris, France (2017), CAPC musée d'art contemporain de Bordeaux, Bordeaux, France (2017), Jönköping County Museum, Sweden (2017), Guggenheim New York (2016), Sursock Museum, Beirut (2016), Cent Quatre, Paris (2016), Sharjah Art Space (2016), MACBA, Spain (2015); Warsaw Museum of Modern Art, Poland (2015); Es Baluard Museu d'Art Modern i Contemporani de Palma, Spain (2015); Gwangju Museum of Art, South Korea (2014); Photography Biennial, Finland (2014); Tate Modern, London, United Kingdom (2013); Home Works 6, Beirut, Lebanon (2013); Berlinale Film Festival, Berlin, Germany (2013); the Toronto International Film Festival, Canada (2012 and 2013); Museum of Modern Art, New York, USA (2012); Centre Georges Pompidou, Paris, France (2011); Contemporary Image Collective, Cairo, Egypt (2009); 52nd Venice Bienniale, Italy (2007); Manifesta, Amsterdam, Netherlands (2005); and others.

Ali Cherri (born in Beirut, Lebanon) is a Paris-based filmmaker and visual artist. He holds a BA in Graphic Design from the American University of Beirut and an MA in Performing Arts from the Amsterdam DasArts – Academy of Drama and Dance. Cherri is the recipient of Harvard University's Robert E.

He received the Fulton Scholarship in 2016, his work has been featured in major exhibitions, including If You Prick Us, Do We Not Bleed? At the National Gallery, London, Milk of Dreams 59th Venice Biennale International Art Exhibition, Minds Rising, Spirits Tuning, 13th Gwangju Biennale, South Korea (2020); The Gatekeepers, Marseille - Manifesta 13, France (2020); Comme un parfum d'aventure in Lyon, France (2020); Phantom limbs in Jameel Art Center, Dubai, United Arab Emirates (2019);But a Storm Is Blowing from Paradise, Guggenheim Museum and Gallery of Modern Art in Milan (2018); Statues Also Die at the Egizio Museum in Milan (2018); and Somniculus at the Jeu de Paume in Paris and the CAPC Contemporary Art Museum in Bordeaux (2017).

His films have been screened at international film festivals including New Director/New Films MoMA NY; Reel Cinemas, Centre Pompidou; CPH:DOX (New Vision Award Winner); Dubai International Film Festival (Best Director Award); VideoBrasil (Southern Panorama Award); Berlin Film Festival; Toronto International Film Festival and San Francisco International Film Festival, etc.

== Legal case ==
On March 31st, 2026, Cherri filed a legal complaint in a court in Paris over an Israeli bombing of his family home in Lebanon on the 26th of November 2024 which killed his parents and a domestic worker, claiming the attack could constitute a war crime. It was the first time a French court has taken a case over Israel's bombardment of Lebanon. The case is supported by the International Federation for Human Rights.
