= A Fire There =

- French: Un feu au loin
- Directed by: Marlene Edoyan
- Written by: Marlene Edoyan
- Starring: Henrikh Malkhasian; Karlen Ispiryan; Hakob Harutyunyan
- Cinematography: Étienne Roussy
- Edited by: Omar Elhamy
- Music by: Mathieu Charbonneau; Christophe Lamarche-Ledoux
- Production company: Nemesis Films
- Release date: April 22, 2026 (Visions du Réel)
- Running time: 94 minutes
- Country: Canada

A Fire There (French: Un feu au loin) is a Canadian documentary film written and directed by Marlene Edoyan. Taking place in a remote southern Georgian village near the Armenian border, it follows three young men navigating the tension between inherited traditions and their aspirations to shape their own futures.

== Synopsis ==
Set in the remote southern Georgian village of Gandzani, bordering Armenia, the film offers an impressionistic portrait of an Armenian community shaped by exile, lingering Soviet-era nostalgia, and rigid social structures. It follows three friends on the cusp of adulthood, caught between tradition and the desire to forge their own path.

== Distribution ==
The film had its world premiere at the International Feature Film Competition at Visions du Réel 2026 in Nyon, before its North American premiere at Hot Docs in the Canadian Spectrum program. Filmotor acquired world sales rights. Les Films du 3 Mars (F3M) is the Canadian distributor.

It is slated to screen in the National Competition at the 2026 Festival du nouveau cinéma.
