= Louis Clichy =

French filmmaker (born 1979)

- Born: 1979 (age 46–47); Chartres, France
- Education: Gobelins, l'école de l'image
- Occupations: Film director; animator
- Years active: 2008–present
- Employer: Pixar (2000s)
- Known for: Asterix: The Mansions of the Gods (2014); Asterix: The Secret of the Magic Potion (2018); Iron Boy (2026)
- Children: 1

Louis Clichy (born 1979) is a French animator who directed Asterix: The Mansions of the Gods (2014), Asterix: The Secret of the Magic Potion (2018), and Iron Boy (2026).

== Early life and education ==
Louis Clichy was born in Chartres, France, in 1979. He grew up on a farm in the Beauce region until he was ten and wore a back brace. He initially attended Sorbonne University before transferring to Gobelins, l'école de l'image. He created the animated shorts Mange!, A quoi sert l'amour?, and Jurannesic at Gobelins before graduating in 2002.

== Career ==
Clichy was a storyboader and 3d animator at Mac Guff. At Pixar he worked in the art department for WALL-E (2008) and Up.

After returning to France Clichy directed a music video for Louise Attaque. He co-directed Asterix: The Mansions of the Gods (2014) and Asterix: The Secret of the Magic Potion (2018) with Alexandre Astier. Iron Boy was the first film Clichy directed by himself. It won the Special Jury Prize of the Un Certain Regard section of the 2026 Cannes Film Festival.

Clichy did a residency at Ciclic in 2022. He taught at Gobelins, l'école de l'image.

== Personal life ==
Clichy has a son, who voiced the main character of Iron Boy.

== Filmography ==
| Year | Title | Director | Writer | Animator | Other | Notes | Reference |
|---|---|---|---|---|---|---|---|
| | Mange! | Yes | Yes | No | No | Short film | |
| | A quoi sert l'amour? | Yes | Yes | No | No | Short film | |
| | Jurannesic | Yes | Yes | No | No | Short film | |
| 2008 | BURN-E | No | No | Yes | No | Short film | |
| 2008 | WALL-E | No | No | Yes | No | | |
| 2009 | Up | No | No | Yes | No | | |
| 2010 | Day & Night | No | No | Yes | No | Short film | |
| 2014 | Asterix: The Mansions of the Gods | Yes | Yes | No | Voice actor | | |
| 2018 | Asterix: The Secret of the Magic Potion | Yes | Yes | No | No | | |
| 2020 | Toon Blast: Tumbleweed | Yes | Yes | No | No | Short film | |
| 2026 | Iron Boy | Yes | Yes | No | No | | |

== Works cited ==
=== News ===
- "Le Corset (Fallen) de Louis Clichy / Eddy séduit le CNC". Catsuka. 22 October 2023. Archived from the original on 10 June 2025.
- Hutchinson, Chase (19 May 2026). "'Iron Boy' Review: This Former Pixar Animator Has Made His Own Magical Hand-Drawn Movie". TheWrap. Archived from the original on 28 May 2026.
- Lang, Jamie (26 May 2026). "Louis Clichy's 'Iron Boy' Wins Special Jury Prize At Animation-Packed Cannes". Cartoon Brew. Archived from the original on 28 May 2026.
- Tallerico, Brian (20 May 2026). "Cannes 2026: Iron Boy, Tangles, Lucy Lost". RogerEbert.com. Archived from the original on 28 May 2026.
- Taylor, Drew (21 May 2026). "Cannes Day 10: 'Victorian Psycho' Shocks, 'Iron Boy' Finds a Home". TheWrap. Archived from the original on 28 May 2026.
- Wiseman, Andreas (21 May 2026). "Sony Classics Buys North America & Multiple International Markets On Cannes Animated Film 'Iron Boy'". Deadline Hollywood. Archived from the original on 28 May 2026.

=== Web ===
- "Iron Boy English Press Kit" (PDF). Cannes Film Festival. Archived (PDF) from the original on 29 May 2026.
- "Louis Clichy". Mubi. Archived from the original on 31 May 2026.
- "Louis Clichy". Gobelins, l'école de l'image. Archived from the original on 31 May 2026.
- "Louis Clichy's feature film project: "Le Corset" in residence in Vendôme!". Ciclic. 10 September 2024. Archived from the original on 31 May 2026.
