= Romain F. Dubois =

Romain F. Dubois is a Canadian film director from Montreal, Quebec.

An alumnus of the film studies program at the Cégep de Saint-Laurent, he has directed music videos for artists such as CRi, Dead Obies, Steve Aoki, David Giguère, Radio Radio and Milk & Bone. His first short film Tranche de nuit, co-directed with Maxime Genois and Félix Poirier, was released in 2020.

Skinny Boots (Skinny bottines), his debut short film as a solo director, premiered in the Critics' Week program at the 2026 Cannes Film Festival, where it won the Sony Discovery Prize.
