= Nyla Innuksuk =

Canadian Inuk film director

- Innuksuk in 2026
- Born: December 4, 1986 (age 39); Igloolik, Nunavut, Canada
- Citizenship: Canadian
- Occupation: Film director

Nyla Innuksuk is a Canadian film director, writer, and producer, and virtual reality content creator. She is the CEO of Mixtape VR.

== Early life ==
Innuksuk was born in Igloolik and spent her childhood growing up in Iqaluit. She attended Ryerson University, where she received a degree in film production in 2009.

== Film work ==
Innuksuk has mainly worked on short documentary and fiction films focusing on Inuit and Indigenous peoples' stories. Her films are portraits of communities and community members in the Arctic, with a strong commitment to including community members in production phases of a film. Her films often also have a focus on the youth in Inuit communities, and the social problems they face.

Innuksuk has also won Canada's Pitch This competition by Telefilm Canada for her project titled Qalupalik. She was director resident at the Canadian Film Centre.

=== Kajutaijuq (2015) ===
Co-written and co-produced by Innuksuk, Kajutaijuq premiered at the Toronto International Film Festival and was selected as one of the Canada's Top Ten Short Films from 2014. Set in the Arctic wilderness, the fiction film follows a hunter, played by Johnny Issaluk, who uses traditional skills to survive. The film is also included in Reel Canada's Indigenous Programme for Canadian National Film Day.

=== Breaths (2016) ===
Innuksuk was the writer and director for Breaths, a short documentary made for the Governor General's Performing Arts Award recipient, Susan Aglukark.

=== Slash/Back (2022) ===
Innuksuk is the writer, director and producer for the Arctic set sci-fi adventure Slash/Back about a group of 14-year old Inuit girls who fight an alien invasion in Nunavut. The film is the first feature movie ever shot in Pangnirtung, Nunavut and is produced by Nyla Innusuk's Mixtape VR, Daniel Bekerman (The Witch, Falling) Scythia Films, Christopher Yurkovich & Alex Ordanis of Stellar Citizens and Stacey Aglok Macdonald (The Grizzlies) and Alethea Arnaquq-Baril of Red Marrow Media and Ethan Lazar (The Witch). The script was written by Nyla Innuksuk and Ryan Cavan.

The film stars Iqaluit, Nunavut locals Tasiana Shirley, Alexis Vincent-Wolfe, Nalajoss Ellsworth, Chelsea Prusky, and Frankie Vincent-Wolfe.

Innuksuk and a crew of 50 people shot on Baffin Island in the summer of 2019.

Sierra/Affinity represents the film for International Sales.

The film was presented at the Frontières Co-Pro Market in Montréal in 2018, then went on to Helsinki for Frontières Finance and Packaging Forum in 2019 before presenting at the Frontières Platform at the Marché du Film in Cannes in 2019.

=== In the Heart of the South ===
Production on her new film In the Heart of the South was announced in 2025. The film stars Anna Lambe and Zorga Qaunaq, and will premiere in the Platform Prize program at the 2026 Toronto International Film Festival.

== Virtual reality work ==
=== Pinnguaq Productions ===
Since April 2015, Innuksuk has been a co-owner at the non-for-profit startup, Pinnguaq. With Innuksuk joining the Pinnguaq team, they created the department called Pinnguaq Productions. This division specializes in virtual reality and 360 degree filmmaking. Projects have included capturing the Pope's 2015 visit to Ecuador and the creation of an interactive trailer for Bang Bang Baby a Toronto International Film Festival film.

Innuksuk has worked with a variety of musical artists such as Tanya Tagaq and A Tribe Called Red. The project with A Tribe Called Red, called DocX: A Tribe Called Red: Indian City 360°, is an immersive virtual reality that allows the listener to be the DJ and mix their own track. Innuksuk left Pinnguaq in March 2017.

==== 2167 ====
In partnership with Toronto International Film Festival, imagineNATIVE, and the Initiative for Indigenous Futures, Pinnguaq Productions created the 2167 project. Using virtual reality, this project asks artists to imagine what a future Canada may look like 150 years in the future.

== Other work ==
Innuksuk wrote a short story centering on the Marvel Comics superhero Snowguard for the comic Marvel Voices: Heritage #1.

== Filmography ==
Year	Title	Contribution
2012	Stories from Our Land 1.5: Innigruti: The Thing That Sings! (short)	Director/Writer
2015	Kajutaijuq (short)	Co-Writer/Co-Producer
2015	Stories from Our Land Vol. 2: Finding Home (short)	Director/Writer
2016	Breaths (short)	Director/Writer
2021	Slash/Back (Feature)	Director/Writer
2026	In the Heart of the South (Feature)	Director/Writer
