= DGC Award for Best Direction in a Feature Film =

The DGC Award for Outstanding Directorial Achievement in Feature Film is an annual Canadian award, presented by the Directors Guild of Canada to honour the year's best direction in feature films in Canada.

== Winners and nominees ==
=== 2000s ===
Year	Film	Director	Ref
2002
2002	Rare Birds	Sturla Gunnarsson	
2002	A Nero Wolfe Mystery: "The Christmas Party"	Holly Dale	
2002	Queer as Folk: "French Fried"	Jeremy Podeswa	
2002	Twice in a Lifetime: "Moonshine Over Harlem"	David Winning	
2003
2003	Spider	David Cronenberg	
2003	Ararat	Atom Egoyan	
2003	Marion Bridge	Wiebke von Carolsfeld	
2003	Savage Messiah	Mario Azzopardi	
2004
2004	The Barbarian Invasions (Les Invasions barbares)	Denys Arcand	
2004	The Blue Butterfly (Le papillon bleu)	Léa Pool	
2004	Falling Angels	Scott Smith	
2004	The Saddest Music in the World	Guy Maddin	
2005
2005	Saint Ralph	Michael McGowan	
2005	Blood	Jerry Ciccoritti	
2005	The Confessor	Lewin Webb	
2005	Pure	Jim Donovan	
2006
2006	A History of Violence	David Cronenberg	
2006	3 Needles	Thom Fitzgerald	
2006	Niagara Motel	Gary Yates	
2006	Where the Truth Lies	Atom Egoyan	
2007
2007	Away from Her	Sarah Polley	
2007	Bon Cop, Bad Cop	Érik Canuel	
2007	Fido	Andrew Currie	
2007	Poor Boy's Game	Clement Virgo	
2008
2008	Eastern Promises	David Cronenberg	
2008	Fugitive Pieces	Jeremy Podeswa	
2008	My Winnipeg	Guy Maddin	
2008	The Stone Angel	Kari Skogland	
2009
2009	Fifty Dead Men Walking	Kari Skogland	
2009	Kit Kittredge: An American Girl	Patricia Rozema	
2009	One Week	Michael McGowan	
2009	Passchendaele	Paul Gross	

=== 2010s ===
Year	Film	Director	Ref
2010
2010	Leslie, My Name Is Evil	Reginald Harkema	
2010	Chloe	Atom Egoyan	
2010	Faith, Fraud, & Minimum Wage	George Mihalka	
2010	A Wake	Penelope Buitenhuis	
2011
2011	Barney's Version	Richard J. Lewis	
2011	Gunless	William Phillips	
2011	Score: A Hockey Musical	Michael McGowan	
2011	Splice	Vincenzo Natali	
2012
2012	A Dangerous Method	David Cronenberg	
2012	Goon	Michael Dowse	
2012	The Samaritan	David Weaver	
2012	Take This Waltz	Sarah Polley	
2013
2013	Still Mine	Michael McGowan	
2013	Home Again	Sudz Sutherland	
2013	Moving Day	Mike Clattenburg	
2013	Whitewash	Emanuel Hoss-Desmarais	
2014
2014	The Grand Seduction	Don McKellar	
2014	Cas & Dylan	Jason Priestley	
2014	Empire of Dirt	Peter Stebbings	
2014	The F Word	Michael Dowse	
2015
2015	Elephant Song	Charles Binamé	
2015	The Calling	Jason Stone	
2015	Fall	Terrance Odette	
2015	Preggoland	Jacob Tierney	
2016
2016	Hyena Road	Paul Gross	
2016	Born to Be Blue	Robert Budreau	
2016	Remember	Atom Egoyan	
2016	The Saver	Wiebke von Carolsfeld	
2017
2017	Weirdos	Bruce McDonald	
2017	Awakening the Zodiac	Jonathan Wright	
2017	Mean Dreams	Nathan Morlando	
2017	Two Lovers and a Bear	Kim Nguyen	
2017	Undercover Grandpa	Érik Canuel	
2018
2018	The Grizzlies	Miranda de Pencier	
2018	Adventures in Public School	Kyle Rideout	
2018	Giant Little Ones	Keith Behrman	
2018	Mary Goes Round	Molly McGlynn	
2019
2019	Mouthpiece	Patricia Rozema	
2019	Stockholm	Robert Budreau	
2019	Firecrackers	Jasmin Mozaffari	
2019	Freaks	Zach Lipovsky, Adam Stein	
2019	Red Snow	Marie Clements	

=== 2020s ===
Year	Film	Director	Ref
2020
2020	In the Tall Grass	Vincenzo Natali	
2020	Akilla's Escape	Charles Officer	
2020	Our Own (Les Nôtres)	Jeanne Leblanc	
2020	Rustic Oracle	Sonia Boileau	
2020	Target Number One	Daniel Roby	
2021
2021	Sugar Daddy	Wendy Morgan	
2021	All My Puny Sorrows	Michael McGowan	
2021	Brother, I Cry	Jessie Anthony	
2021	Cinema of Sleep	Jeffrey St. Jules	
2021	Come True	Anthony Scott Burns	
2021	The Righteous	Mark O'Brien	
2022
2022	Crimes of the Future	David Cronenberg	
2022	Delia's Gone	Robert Budreau	
2022	Donkeyhead	Agam Darshi	
2022	Night Raiders	Danis Goulet	
2022	Run Woman Run	Zoe Leigh Hopkins	
2022	You Can Live Forever	Sarah Watts, Mark Slutsky	
2023
2023	Women Talking	Sarah Polley	
2023	Brother	Clement Virgo	
2023	Days of Happiness (Les Jours heureux)	Chloé Robichaud	
2023	Fitting In	Molly McGlynn	
2023	Infinity Pool	Brandon Cronenberg	
2024
2024	The Queen of My Dreams	Fawzia Mirza	
2024	We Forgot to Break Up	Karen Knox	
2024	Code 8: Part II	Jeff Chan	
2024	Really Happy Someday	J Stevens	
2024	Village Keeper	Karen Chapman	
2025
2025	Final Destination: Bloodlines	Zach Lipovsky, Adam Stein	
2025	40 Acres	R. T. Thorne	
2025	Nika and Madison	Eva Thomas	
2025	Rumours	Guy Maddin	
2025	Two Women (Deux femmes en or)	Chloé Robichaud	
2026
2026	At the Place of Ghosts (Sk+te'kmujue'katik)	Bretten Hannam	
2026	Bearded Girl	Jody Wilson	
2026	Finch & Midland	Timothy Yeung	
2026	Sweetness	Emma Higgins	
2026	Tight Lettuce	Harrison Houde	
