= Fantasia International Film Festival =

Canadian film festival

Coordinates: 45.497°N 73.578°W

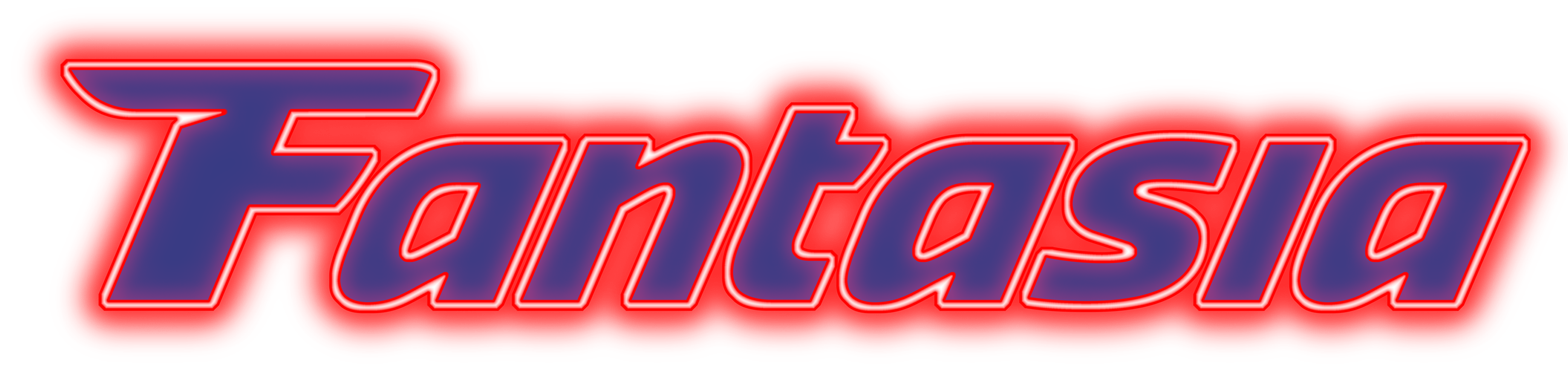
- Status: Active
- Genre: Film festival
- Locations: Montreal, Quebec
- Country: Canada
- Inaugurated: 1996; 30 years ago
- Most recent: July 16–August 2, 2026
- Attendance: 100,000+
- Website: fantasiafestival.com

The Fantasia International Film Festival, also known as Fantasia Fest or simply Fantasia, is an annual film festival founded in 1996 and held primarily in Montreal, Quebec, Canada. It specializes in genre films, including fantasy, horror, science fiction, and cult cinema, and draws over 100,000 attendees each year.

Fantasia is frequently cited as the leading genre film festival in North America, and is considered one of the top three genre festivals worldwide, alongside Sitges and Fantastic Fest. Its mission is to promote genre, anti-Hollywood cinema and assist independent filmmakers, having launched the careers of many modern auteurs throughout the years.

Since 2012, the festival has also held the Frontières cinema market that allows promising projects to find potential producers and distributors. Since 2016, Frontières has partnered with the Marché du Film, led by the Cannes Film Festival, and from 2026, with the European Film Market at the Berlin International Film Festival, and the new TIFF Market at the Toronto International Film Festival.

== Overview ==
Fantasia focuses on niche, low-budget films of various genres, from horror to science fiction, most of them non-PG. It grew from the Asian film scene in Montreal and still has a significant emphasis on Asian cinema.

Fantasia’s flagship section is Cheval Noir, in which winners are awarded with the festival's mascot statuette, a mighty black pegasus. Apart from Cheval Noir, the festival includes New Flesh, Séquences, Camera Lucida, the Satoshi Kon prize, and several other sections. Every year, the program offers master-classes and special screenings, as well as world and American premieres, press conferences and panel discussions with actors and directors. In 2016, a new section Documentaries From the Edge was established.

Mitch Davis has been the festival's creative director since 1997. According to Davis, Fantasia's mission is to present niche, genre, noncommercial movies from independent auteurs to the audience, and give the films deserved attention. Guillermo del Toro calls Fantasia “a shrine to all geeks and a feast for those who love things completely unlovable to most.” Bill Plympton treasures its anti-Hollywood atmosphere. The audience at Fantasia is considered to be open-minded people with a good sense of humor and good, albeit somewhat unconventional, taste. Festival regulars say that audiences always meow loudly before the screening of feature films, a tradition that continues today.

The fest has two indoor locations and many events are held in cafes, restaurants, and karaoke bars. The atmosphere is famous for its informal vibe as screenings are open, VIP zones are not isolated and even directors and actors freely blend in the crowd.

By 2020, Fantasia had already been recognized as one of the most important cinema fests in North America. Founded by cinephiles and initially driven by sheer enthusiasm, it was supported only with private money for more than a decade. Only when its audience surpassed that of WWF and FNC did the festival attract governmental attention and further funding. The New Flesh section is now considered "one of the world's premier launching pads for new voices in genre cinema".

In 2012, Fantasia founded the Frontières platform to promote genre films and help promising projects. For its first season, 12 projects were selected and then presented to producers and distributors. In 2013, Frontières was invited to host a European section at the Brussels International Fantastic Film Festival. In 2016, Frontières announced a joint program with the Cannes' Marché du Film; together they select and present promising projects to potential partners. Frontières was also offered to host its section of genre cinema at the Cannes Film Festival.

In its more than two decades of history, Fantasia has made a significant contribution to Canadian film culture, built its audience and helped arthouse cinema emerge from the underground. In cinematic circles, there is discussion of the Fantasia Generation of outstanding creators, who grew up with the festival. Among the first attendees were Roadkill Superstars, who have confessed to forging documents to attend non-PG movies. Their film Turbo Kid was funded and produced thanks to the Frontières. Similarly, Fantasia and the Frontières helped launch production company Astron-6 and financed The Void, Radius, The Ranger, and many more.

== History ==
=== 1996–2005 ===
Fant-Asia 1996 was launched by "three Hong Kong new wave fanboys" Martin Sauvageau, André Dubois and Pierre Corbeil, who felt a growing local interest in Asian films and the desire to watch them on the big screen. The 1996 edition of the festival lasted for a whole month and featured six months worth of entirely Asian fantasy and action movies with a significant prevalence of Chow Yun-fat and Jet Li retrospectives.

FantAsia 1997 was held from July 11 to August 10. The lineup included Perfect Blue, Drunken Master II, Stagefright, El Dia de la Bestia, Henry, Tromeo and Juliet, Cutting Moments and others. A Gun for Jennifer won the main prize and was met by a standing ovation of the audience.

In 1998, Fantasia's Toronto edition premiered at the Bloor Cinema. That year, Tony Timpone joined the management team.

2002 became the missed year for Fantasia due to problems with the main venue, Imperial Cinema. Only four months before the event, the theater announced cancellation because of the broken air conditioning system. Indeed, the theater was not repaired until 2004. Alternate bookings were not available. The lack of assurance for the 2003 festival meant a change in venue and so, Fantasia 2003 moved Concordia University.

Fantasia 2003 was held for the first time on the Concordia University campus, using the de Sève Cinema and Henry F. Hall Alumni Auditorium. This was also the first year that a DVD filled with movie trailers of movies shown at the festival was available for purchase with the festival guide book.

=== 2006 ===
Fantasia's 10th anniversary and 10th edition, the 2006 edition, is the first to feature free outdoor shows. The outdoors shows are at Parc de la Paix and are free. Outdoor projections included films from the previous editions: Kamikaze Girls, the last four episodes of Goldorak, Night of the Living Dorks and Attack the Gas Station. The indoor shows use the same Concordia University facilities as since the move to Concordia. The outdoor shows are several kilometres away from the indoor shows. The main prize was won by Blood Curse. With its 10th anniversary, Fantasia helped to launch an associated but separate Toronto festival Toronto After Dark Film Festival.

=== 2007 ===
This edition was held from July 5 to July 23 at the Concordia University. In addition to the Hall hall and DeSeve hall, a third screening room has been added at the D.B. Clarke Theatre. There were, however, no outdoor shows this year. Montreal film Flutter received the award for best Quebec short feature. Memories of Matsuko was selected as the best Asian feature film, in European program won the Hatchet. In animation the main prize went to We Are the Strange. A total of more than 81,000 tickets were sold for Fantasia 2007. Mitch Davis signed a first-look production deal with Paramount's Blumhouse Prods. to scout for new projects and foreign movies for potential remakes.

=== 2008 ===
In 2008, Fantasia was held from July 3 to July 21. It featured the world premieres of Pig Hunt, Home Movie, Repo! The Genetic Opera, Midnight Meat Train, Eric Shapiro's Rule of Three, Truffles (Truffe), Treevenge, The Facts in the Case of Mister Hollow, Electric Fence, Paradox Mary, Laura Panic, and Don't Worry. Gordon Liu attended the screening of Disciples of the 36th Chamber as a guest star.

=== 2009 ===
In 2009, Fantasia was held from July 9 to July 29, opened with Takashi Miike's film Yatterman and ended on July 29, 2009 with the North American premiere of Quentin Tarantino's film Inglourious Basterds. Among the films screened at Fantasia 2009 were Thirst, Love Exposure, Dream, Embodiment of Evil, Vampire Girl vs. Frankenstein Girl, Smash Cut, Trick 'r Treat, Neighbor, Must Love Death, Cencoroll, Dread.

Official poster for the 2011 festival

=== 2010s ===
==== 2010 ====
The films for Fantasia 2010 were announced on Tuesday, June 29, 2010. Tickets went on sale on July 6, 2010 at 1 pm. The Festival started on July 8, 2010 running until July 28, 2010 with 6 indoor screening venues and one outdoor location. For 2010, a permanent blog was introduced to communicate with fans year-round. Opening film: The Sorcerer's Apprentice, presented by Jay Baruchel. Among Canadian premieres were Scott Pilgrim vs. the World, The Last Exorcism, The Violent Kind, Van Von Hunter, Black Lightning. World premieres included I Spit on Your Grave, The Shrine, etc. The lineup included A Serbian Film, Air Doll, Best Worst Movie, The House of the Devil, Smash Cut, and many more. The special screening of Combat Shock was attended by Buddy Giovinazzo. Pater Sparrow's 1 received the Cheval Noir as best feature film of the year.

==== 2011 ====
Fantasia 2011 held 19 world premieres and a lineup of 134 movies from 25 countries. The festival opened with the Canadian Premiere of Red State, other premieres included Final Destination 5. Also notable was the world premiere of the Swedish horror film Marianne.

Yoshimasa Ishibashi was awarded with the Best Director prize (for Milocrorze: A love story). Best Screenplay award was given to Park Hoon-jung (for The Unjust). I Love You short from The Theatre Bizarre was specially noted by the jury. Best Animation prize went to Surviving Life. Amiel Courtin-Wilson's Hail won in The Séquences.

The festival also featured the presentation to John Landis of a lifetime Achievement award, while Landis presented his new film Burke and Hare.

==== 2012 ====
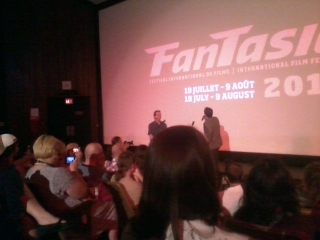
Premier of Alter Egos at Fantasia Film Festival in Montreal July 24, 2012

In 2012, Fantasia was held from 19 July to 7 August. Its 90,000 audience exceeded WFF's, the festival was extensively covered in the world media.

Fantasia 2012 featured the screenings of the films Toad Road, Doomsday Book (won the main prize), the horror anthology film V/H/S, Hidden in the Woods (original version), Seediq Bale, and Quentin Dupieux's Wrong.

==== 2013 ====
In 2013, Fantasia was held from 18 July to 7 August, its program included 120 films. Among premieres were Antosocial and Curse of Chucky. The lineup featured Return to Nuke 'Em High Volume 1, Raze, Bad Milo!, Willow Creek (film), After School Midnighters, I'll Give It My All... Tomorrow, The Complex, Gatchaman, The World's End, and many more.

Big Bad Wolves took the main prize as the best feature film, Hou Chi-jan became the best director for his movie When a Wolf Falls in Love with a Sheep. Andrzej Żuławski received the achievement award, while at the New Flesh section Evan Louis Katz won with his debut Cheap Thrills.

==== 2014 ====
Fantasia 2014 lasted from July 17 to August 5, it featured 160 movies and had 216 screenings, while the audience grew to 129,000. That year's poster was created by Donald Caron, it paid tribute to Ray Harryhausen, Ray Bradbury, Forrest J Ackerman who flew across the sky in the Bewitched Canoe (a piece of Québec folklore, La Chasse Galerie piloted by the Devil). Jacky in Women's Kingdom became the opening film. Premieres included Unfriended by Levan Gabriadze, The Midnight Swim by Sarah Adina Smith, The Creeping Garden.

At the New Flesh section won Hugh Sullivan's The Infinite Man. Mamoru Oshii and Tobe Hooper were honoured with the Achievements award. Giovanni's Island by Mizuho Nishikubo won the main prize for best animation.

==== 2015 ====
Fantasia-2015 had 22 world premieres, including Momentum. For the first time the festival introduced the VR-section. This year program featured Anguish, Wild City, Goodnight Mommy, and many more.

Sion Sono received the main prize for Tag, Reina Triendl became the best actress. Miss Hokusai won in Animation, La La La at Rock Bottom won in the Best Screenplay.

==== 2016 ====
For the first time in its history, Fantasia's audience exceeded 100,000. That year the festival had 209 screenings and 19 world premieres, including King Dave by Daniel Grou, Goran by Nevio Marasović, Realive by Mateo Gil, Some Freaks, etc. Yeon Sang-ho's Train to Busan won as the best feature film, Kiyoshi Kurosawa became the best director (for Creepy). Award for the best screenplay went to E J-yong for The Bacchus Lady. Guillermo del Toro was honoured with Achievement award. Agnieszka Smoczyńska received the special mention of the jury for The Lure.

==== 2017 ====
Fantasia-2017 went from July 13 to August 2 with a lineup of more than 150 feature films and 300 shorts, from Luc Besson's $200 mln Valerian and the City of a Thousand Planets to Nabwana I.G.G.'s $65 Bad Black. The Villainess opened the fest and the A Taxi Driver closed. Atomic Blonde, Agnieszka Holland's Spoor and You Only Live Once premiered. Robert Pattinson presented Good Time. Violetta Schurawlow won the Best Actress for her role in Cold Hell, Nattawut Poonpiriya became the Best Director for his Bad Genius.

==== 2018 ====
Fantasia-2018 was held from 12 July to 2 August and included 125 feature films and 220 shorts. That year poster featured a flying cat and a space pug. The festival was opened by Santiago Menghini's short Milk and Daniel Roby's Just a Breath Away. The list of premieres included The Man Who Killed Hitler and Then the Bigfoot, Mandy, Kenji Tanigaki Big Brother, LaPlace's Witch, Black Tide. Joe Dante was honoured with the Achievement award.

Just a Breath Away won the main prize, however, some criticized that decision and mentioned that many other movies that year were better made, while in Just a Breath Away the leading cast lacked genuine emotions and delivered poorly. Nosipho Dumisa was awarded the Best Director prize for his Number 37. Cam won in the New Flesh section, its creator Isa Mazzei also was awarded with Cheval Noir Best Screenplay. Kim Da-mi became the Best Actress for her role in The Witch: Part 1. The Subversion. Microhabitat won in Camera Lucida section.

==== 2019 ====
Fantasia 2019 lasted from July 11 to August 1. That year's poster was created by Donald Caron and depicted new favourites of the audience – a luchador pug and enormous flying cat. The lineup of more than 100 feature films and numerous shorts included Ready or Not, Sadako, The Lodge, Vivarium, Killerman, Master Z: Ip Man Legacy, Satanic Panic, and many more. The festival held a 25th anniversary screening of The Crow.

Best Asian Feature went to Fly Me to the Saitama, Best International Feature - to Lake Michigan Monster, Best Action! Feature became The Gangster, the Cop, the Devil. Cheval Noir Best Feature went to Idol, Best Director and Best Screenplay went to Carlo Mirabella-Davis for Swallow. In New Flesh section won Kirill Sokolov's Why Don't You Just Die!. Edward R. Pressman received the Achievement Award.

=== 2020s ===
==== 2020 ====
In 2020, due to COVID-19 restrictions, the festival went online and was moved to late summer, starting on 20 August and ending on 2 September. The screenings at Festival Scope and Shift72 were accessible from Canadian IP addresses. Among more than 100 feature films, selected for the festival, were Neil Marshall's The Reckoning, Shinichiro Ueda's Special Actors, Nobuhiko Obayashi's Labyrinth of Cinema, Brea Grant's 12 Hour Shift, Shakespeare's Shitstorm, A Costume for Nicholas, and many more.

Best Asian Feature went to Special Actors by Shinichiro Ueda, Best European/North-South American Feature – to The Mortuary Collection. Come True was honoured as the Most Groundbreaking film of the festival.

Closing film: The Great Yokai War: Guardians.

==== 2021 ====
The 25th anniversary edition featured 25 feature film world premieres, 12 international and 34 North American premieres. Opening film: Brain Freeze.

Cheval Noir Competition-Best Film Award was given to Voice of Silence by Hong Eui-jeong, Cheval Noir Competition-Best Actor Award took Yoo Ah-in, Best Actress – Zelda Adams (for Hellbender). Best Screenplay award went to The Righteous. Beyond the Infinite Two Minutes won the Audience prize.

==== 2022 ====
The 26th edition of the festival was held from 14 July to 3 August 2022. In the festival over 130 features and 200 shorts were screened. The highlight of the festival was honouring John Woo, the Hong Kong-based filmmaker, with the Career Achievement Award.

- Opening film: Polaris by K C Carthew
- Closing film: Next Sohee

Awardees

- Cheval Noir Competition-Best Film Award: Megalomaniac by Karim Ouelhaj
- Cheval Noir Competition-Best Director Award: Jung Ju-ri for Next Sohee
- Audience Award, International Feature: The Artifice Girl, Franklin Ritch (gold); La Pieta, Eduardo Casanova (silver); Deadstream, Joseph and Vanessa Winter (bronze).
- Audience Award, Canadian Feature: The Fight Machine, Andrew Thomas Hunt (gold); Cult Hero, Jesse Thomas Cook (silver); Relax, I'm from the Future, Luke Higginson (bronze).
- Audience Award, Quebec: Nut Jobs (Les Pas d'allure), Alexandre Leblanc (gold); Bright Star, Raphaël Hébert (silver); La Guêpe, Marc Beaupré
- Audience Award, Asian Feature: The Roundup, Lee Sang-yong (gold); Next Sohee, Jung Ju-ri (silver); One for the Road, Nattawut Poonpiriya (bronze).
- Audience Award, Animated Feature: Princess Dragon, Anthony Roux and Jean-Jacques Denis (gold); Inu-Oh, Masaaki Yuasa (silver); Chun Tae-il: A Flame That Lives On, Jun-pyo Hong (bronze).
- Audience Award, Documentary: The Pez Outlaw, Amy Bandlien Storkel and Bryan Storkel (gold); Que le fan soit avec toi, Marc Joly-Corcoran (silver); Out in the Ring, Ry Levey (bronze).

==== 2023 ====
The 27th edition of Fantasia was held July 20 – August 9. Juried award winners were announced on July 30, and Audience Award winners were announced on August 14.

Cheval Noir

- Best Film Award: Red Rooms (Les Chambres rouges) — Pascal Plante
- Special Mention: Vincent Must Die (Vincent doit mourir) — Stéphan Castaing
- Best Director Award: Sam H. Freeman and Ng Choon Ping, Femme
- Best Screenplay: Pascal Plante, Red Rooms (Les Chambres rouges)
- Best Score: Dominique Plante, Red Rooms (Les Chambres rouges)
- Best Cinematography: Zelda Adams and John Adams, Where the Devil Roams
- Best Performance: Nathan Stewart-Jarrett, Femme and Juliette Gariépy, Red Rooms (Les Chambres rouges)

New Flesh

- Best First Feature: Stay Online — Yeva Strelnikova
- Special Mentions: Tiger Stripes — Amanda Nell Eu; The Abandoned — Tseng Ying-Ting

International Short Film Competition

- Best Short Film: Bold Eagle — Whammy Alcazaren
- Best Director: Jacob Chase, Mr. Blur
- Best Screenplay: David Winstone, The Nobelto Method
- Outstanding Performance: Silvana Mihai, The Taster; Lim Hyojin, Shoulder
- Special Mention: Sweet Juices — Im Sejon, Will Suen
- Best Score: Matthias Dewilde, Poppy's Saturn
- Best Cinematography: Julien Ramirez Hernan, Transylvanie

Axis
Satoshi Kon Award for Excellence in Animation

- Best Feature Film: The First Slam Dunk — Takehiko Inoue
- Special Jury Mention: Sand Land — Toshihisa Yokoshima
- Best Short Film – Gold: A Kind of Testament — Stephen Vuillemin
- Best Short Film – Silver: Architect A — Lee Jonghoon
- Best Short Film – Bronze: Record. Play. Stop. — Neeraj Bhattacharjee

AQCC

- Camera Lucida: Ireland Blue Book (Irlande cahier bleu) — Olivier Godin
- Special Jury Mention: Home Invasion — Graeme Arnfield

Audience Awards

- International Feature — Gold: Talk to Me (Australia, Danny and Michael Philippou); Silver: Late Night with the Devil (USA, Cameron & Colin Cairns); Bronze: Hundreds of Beavers (USA, Mike Cheslik)
- International Short — Gold: Get Away (USA, Michael Gabriele); Silver: Lollygag (USA, Tij D'oyen); Bronze: Dead Enders (USA, Fidel Ruiz-Healy & Tyler Walker)
- Canadian Feature — Gold: The Sacrifice Game (Jenn Wexler); Silver: My Animal (Jacqueline Castel); Bronze: Daughter of the Sun (Ryan Ward)
- Canadian Short — Gold: White Noise (Tamara Scherbak); Silver: Colin Carvey's Long Halloween (Aaron Peacock) and *666 (Abby Falvo); Bronze: #Bossbabe (Kassy Gascho) and Demon Box (Sean Wainsteim)
- Quebec Feature — Gold: We Are Zombies (François Simard, Anouk Whissell, Yoann-Karl Whissell); Silver: Red Rooms (Les Chambres rouges, Pascal Plante); Bronze: Richelieu (Pier-Philippe Chevigny)
- Quebec Short — Gold: Sacred Premonitions of the Celestial Light (Vic Caputo); Silver: If (Didier Charette); Bronze: Beat It (Thomas Lorber)
- Asian Feature — Gold: The Roundup: No Way Out (South Korea, Lee Sang-yong); Silver: River (Japan, Junta Yamaguchi); Bronze: Phantom (South Korea, Lee Hae-young)
- Asian Short — Gold: Foreigners Only (Bangladesh, Nuhash Humayun); Silver: Shoulder (South Korea, Kim Jaehyung); Bronze: Night of the Bride (India, Virat Pal)
- Animated Feature — Gold: Kurayukaba (Japan, Shigeyoshi Tsukahara); Silver: The Concierge (Japan, Yoshimi Itazu); Bronze: The First Slam Dunk (Japan, Takehiko Inoue)
- Animated Short — Gold: Hermit Island (Hungary, Gábor Mariai); Silver: Architect A (South Korea, Lee Jonghoon); Bronze: Jelly (Canada, Robin Budd)
- DGC Award: Satan Wants You — Steve J. Adams, Sean Horlor

Other jury awards

- Prix L'écran fantastique: Restore Point (Czech Republic, Robert Hloz)
- Prix Mon Premier Fantasia — Gold: La Colline aux cailloux (Sweden/France, Marjolaine Perreten); Silver: Que se passe-t-il avec le ciel? (Spain, Irene Iborra); Bronze: Lost in the Laundry (Canada, Salem Preusse); Special Mention: Bedtime Story (Mexico/Russia, Nadia Samarina)

==== 2024 ====
The 28th edition of Fantasia was held July 18 – August 4. The festival's opening film was Bookworm, by Ant Timpson, and the festival closed with André Forcier's film Ababooned (Ababouiné). Forcier received the festival's Prix Denis-Héroux in honour of his overall career achievements.

A special Trailblazer Award was presented to Canadian filmmaker Vincenzo Natali, the director of the influential science fiction thriller film Cube, which also received a special screening of a new 4K restoration on July 30, 2024.

==== 2025 ====
The 29th edition of Fantasia was held from July 17 to August 3. The festival opened with American neo-Western black comedy film Eddington, by Ari Aster, and the Canadian Trailblazer Award was presented to Hungarian-born Canadian filmmaker George Mihalka, the director of the 1981 slasher film My Bloody Valentine. Announced on July 26, the jury awarded prizes in seven of the competition’s eight categories, with the Cheval Noir Award for Best Film going to Mother of Flies, a horror–fantasy film by John Adams, Zelda Adams, and Toby Posner. This marks the first time a U.S. production has received the prestigious award.

==== 2026 ====
The 30th edition of Fantasia was held from July 16 to August 2. The festival opened with Nicholas Winding Refn's Her Private Hell, and closed with Freaks Part II by Adam Stein and Zach Lipovsky, the sequel to their 2018 film Freaks.

== Home media releases ==
- Small Gauge Trauma (ASIN B000FOQ01Y)

Small Gauge Trauma is the name of the film shorts component of Fantasia. A DVD anthology of various shorts shown over various editions of Fantasia has been published.

- Red to Kill (ASIN B00007ELI4)

Fantasia has published a subtitled VHS version of the Hong Kong film Red to Kill, for release in Quebec.

- Run and Kill (ASIN B00007ELI5)

Fantasia has published a subtitled VHS version of the Hong Kong film Run and Kill, for release in Quebec.

- Jackie Chan's Greatest Stunts

Fantasia has published a subtitled VHS version of the Hong Kong action scenes compilation Jackie Chan's Greatest Stunts Volumes 1 & 2, for release in Quebec.

- Jackie Chan: My Stunts (ASIN B000067JH0)

Fantasia has published a subtitled VHS version of Jackie Chan's stunt action compilation My Stunts, for release in Quebec.

- Jackie Chan: My Story (ASIN B000067JH1)

Fantasia has published a subtitled VHS version of Jackie Chan's autobiography My Story, for release in Quebec.

- Trailers DVD

For the 2008, 2007, 2006, 2005, and 2003 festivals, a DVD filled with trailers of some of the films being played has been provided for purchase.

== See also ==
- List of fantastic and horror film festivals
- Toronto After Dark Film Festival

== Literature ==
- Grondin, Melanie (1999). Montreal & Quebec City: A Colourguide. Formac Publishing Company. p. 70. ISBN 9780887804748.
