= Paris International Fantastic Film Festival =

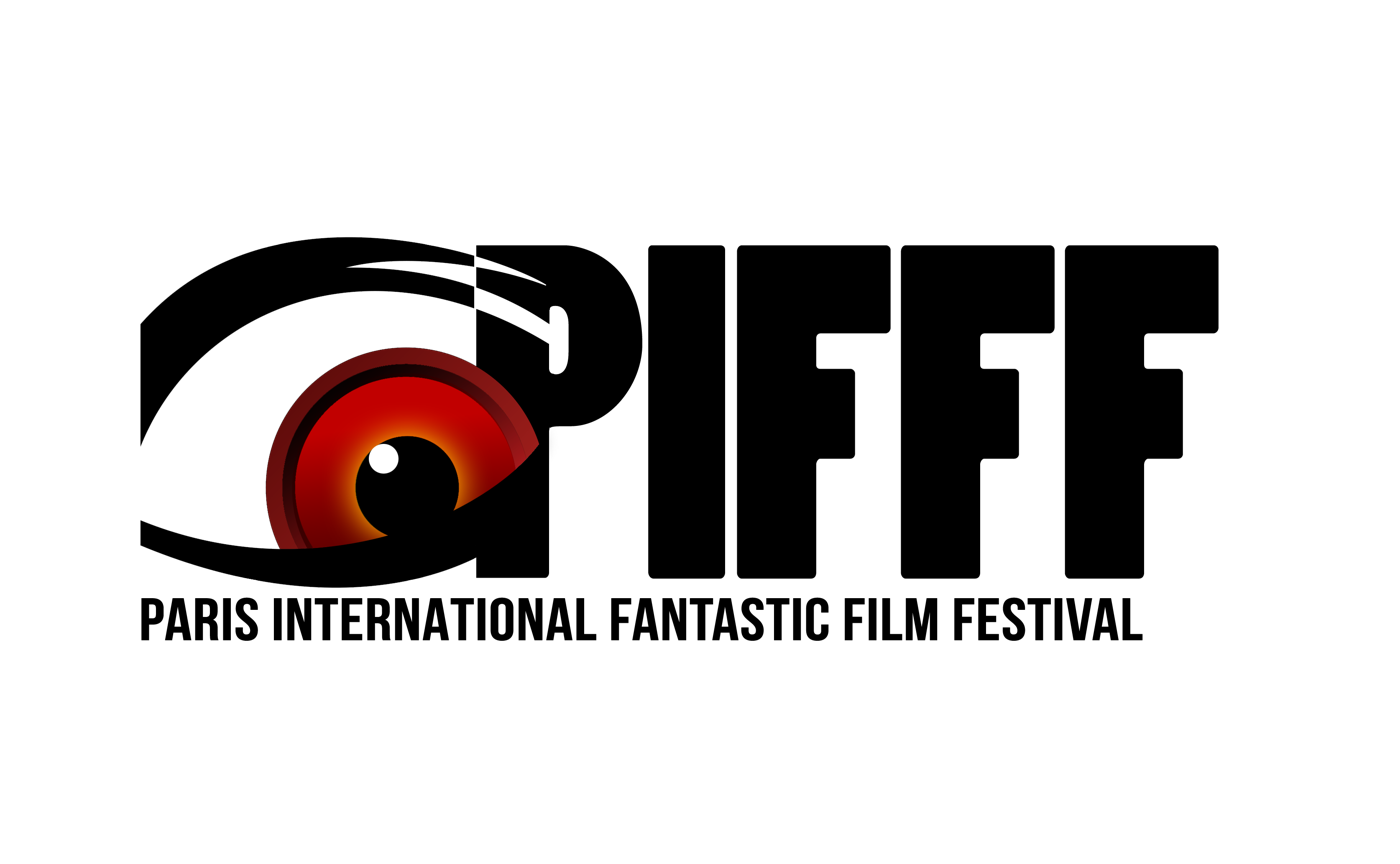

The Paris International Fantastic Film Festival (PIFFF), was created in 2011 by the Paris Ciné Fantastique association as a venue for horror, thriller and science fiction films. It takes place in Paris every year in December, and has been recently presented by television station Ciné+ OCS and Mad Movies magazine. PIFFF has prizes in both feature length and short films. The most recent festival in December 2018 showed 26 films over 8 days and attracted over 10,000 attendees, making it one of the largest film festivals in the city of Paris.

MovieMaker magazine called the festival an "international platform for promising new talent." The festival is held at the historic Max Linder Panorama theater in Paris. The 2018 festival was periodically interrupted by the Yellow Vest gilets jaunes riots that marched by while the festival was in progress.

== Winners of the Golden Eye for Best Film ==
Year	Film title	Director
2011	Bellflower	Evan Glodell
2012	The Body	Oriol Paulo
2013	Cheap Thrills	E. L. Katz
2014	Spring	Justin Benson & Aaron Moorhead
2015	Don't Grow Up	Thierry Poiraud
2016	Raw	Julia Ducournau
2017	Tigers Are Not Afraid	Issa López
2018	Freaks	Adam Stein & Zach Lipovsky

== See also ==
- List of fantastic and horror film festivals
