= Someone's Daughter (film) =

2026 Canadian thriller film directed by Wiebke von Carolsfeld

- Directed by: Wiebke von Carolsfeld
- Written by: Doug Taylor; Wiebke von Carolsfeld
- Produced by: Frédéric Bohbot; Kacim Steets
- Starring: Pascale Bussières; François Arnaud; Peter Outerbridge
- Cinematography: Léna Mill-Reuillard
- Edited by: Marie-Pier Dupuis
- Production companies: Bunbury Films; Prospector Films; Rebel Labs
- Distributed by: Filmoption International
- Release date: July 21, 2026 (Fantasia)
- Country: Canada
- Language: English

Someone's Daughter is a Canadian thriller film, directed by Wiebke von Carolsfeld and released in 2026. The film centres on Sam (Pascale Bussières), a criminal defense lawyer, and Paul (François Arnaud), a client she successfully defended against a sexual assault charge several years earlier, who are kidnapped by Borden (Peter Outerbridge), the father of the sexual assault victim who still does not believe Paul was innocent.

The cast also includes Michael Greyeyes.

== Production ==
The film originally entered development in the early 2020s, under the production of Robert Vroom for Prospector Films. After Vroom left that company to join the National Film Board of Canada, Frédéric Bohbot of Bunbury Films and Kacim Steets of Rebel Labs took over as lead producers, although Vroom and Prospector remained attached as executive producers.

The film entered production in summer 2025, in the Estrie region of Quebec.

On September 3, 2025, the Writers Guild of Canada filed a grievance claiming unpaid fees to the writers. The dispute hinged on whether it was necessary for Bunbury and Rebel Labs to pay a new fee for the screenplay's second draft after the option for the original script expired, even though Prospector Films, which had already paid the original fees, was still involved in the film's production. The Writers Guild of Canada notified the project’s distributors of the dispute due to matters regarding the chain of title. The dispute went to arbitration.

== Distribution ==
The film premiered at the 30th Fantasia International Film Festival.

== Awards ==
At Fantasia, it won the Bronze Audience Award for Quebec films.
