= Cherry and Virgin =

2026 Japanese anime film

- Directed by: Masanao Kawajiri
- Written by: Misato Kaga
- Produced by: Gen Sato
- Production company: Toei Video
- Distributed by: Toei Video
- Release dates: 18 July 2026 (Fantasia Fest); 2027
- Running time: 87 minutes
- Country: Japan
- Language: Japanese

Cherry and Virgin (Note: Japanese: チェリーアンドバージン, Hepburn: Cherīandobājin) is a Japanese romance comedy anime film directed by Masanao Kawajiri. The film premiered on July 18, 2026 at the 30th Fantasia International Film Festival, winning "Special Mention of the Jury" in the 2026 Satoshi Kon Award for Excellence in Animation section. The film is expected to release in 2027.

== Plot ==
Ryo is a 32 year-old erotic manga artist who has little experience interacting with women, and Ami, a 28 year-old illustrator and boys' love manga fan who is abandoning her own creative ambitions and has become distrustful of men. Both are socially awkward, leading them to join the same dating app in an attempt to change their lives. After meeting by chance through the app, Ryo and Ami begin an uneasy relationship marked by oversharing and repeated misunderstandings.

== Characters ==
Ryo Honda (本田遼)
Voiced by: Takashi Ōkado
A 32 year-old erotic manga artist who is socially awkward and has no romantic or sexual experience with women.
Ami Enomoto (榎本亜美)
Voiced by: Yaeko Kiyose
A 28 year-old illustrator and boys' love manga fan who is uncomfortable forming relationships with men.

== Release ==
The film premiered on July 18, 2026 at the 30th Fantasia International Film Festival. The film is expected to release in 2027.

== Reception ==
=== Critical reception ===
Chico Peres Smith of Cult MTL gave the film five stars, praising the use of different animation styles for each character to match their artistic preferences. He also praises the rotoscoped animation and the unique blend of manga panels, live action footage, and other animation techniques to further the story and provide commentary on conventions in anime.

=== Accolades ===
Award	Year	Category	Recipient(s)	Result	Ref.
Fantasia International Film Festival	July 25, 2026	Special Mention of the Jury	Cherry and Virgin	Won	
