= 30th Fantasia International Film Festival =

2026 edition of film festival

- Official poster
- Opening film: Her Private Hell by Nicholas Winding Refn
- Closing film: Freaks Part II by Adam Stein and Zach Lipovsky
- Location: Montreal, Quebec, Canada
- Founded: 1996
- Hosted by: Festival Fantasia Inc
- Artistic director: Mitch Davis
- Festival date: Opening: 16 July 2026; Closing: 2 August 2026
- Language: International
- Website: Fantasia 2026

Fantasia International Film Festival
- 31st 29th

The 30th Fantasia International Film Festival took place in Montreal, Quebec, Canada, from July 16 to August 2, 2026. The festival opened with Nicholas Winding Refn's Her Private Hell, and closed with Freaks Part II by Adam Stein and Zach Lipovsky, the sequel to their 2018 film Freaks.

The full schedule was announced on July 2, 2026.

In honour of the festival's landmark 30th anniversary, it will be followed by a special five-week screening series of standout films from throughout the festival's history, at the Cinémathèque québécoise from August 7 to September 19.

== Competition juries ==
- Cheval noir: Youngjoo Suh (president), Catherine Corcoran, Karim Hussain, Bob Murawski, Jennie Punter
- New Flesh: Brandon Hill (president), Jasper Basch, Julian Fonfrède, Markus Keuschnigg, Hilary Webber
- International Short Film: Adele Banks (president), Abraham Castillo Flores, Fatima Hayward, Terry Leung, Nick McCabe
- Satoshi Kon Award: Sylvie Trouvé (president), Peter Ferguson, Jeff Waye
- Northern Excellence: Kier-La Janisse (president), Matthew Hays, Kelly Kay Hurcomb, Naomi Jaye, Mike Peterson, James Watts
- Fantastic Weekends of Quebec Cinema: Manon Dumais (president), Marc-Antoine Lemire, Marie-Chantal Perron
- AQCC: Alexandre Blasquez, Rachel Goulet, Sylvian Lavallée
- Poulain noir: Vincent Gosselin, Sébastien Latour, Rui Ting Ji, Laura Venditti, Simon Yeretsian

== Films ==
=== Opening Film ===
English title	Original title	Director(s)	Production country
Her Private Hell		Nicholas Winding Refn	Denmark, United States

=== Closing Film ===
English title	Original title	Director(s)	Production country
Freaks Part II		Adam Stein, Zach Lipovsky	Canada

=== Compétition Cheval Noir ===
English title	Original title	Director(s)	Production country
AnyMart		Yusuke Iwasaki	Japan
Beasts Clutching at Straws		Hideo Jojo	Japan
Corpus		Corrin Evans	United States
Ferine		Andrea Corsini	Italy
Freaks Part II		Adam Stein, Zach Lipovsky	Canada
Hot Spot		Agnieszka Smoczyńska	Poland, Greece, Sweden, Norway
Nightborn	Yön lapsi	Hanna Bergholm	Finland, Lithuania, France, United Kingdom
No Rest for the Wicked		Kasper Kalle	Denmark, Faroe Islands, Iceland
Sleep No More	Monster Pabrik Rambut	Edwin	Indonesia, France, Germany, Japan, Singapore
Someone's Daughter		Wiebke von Carolsfeld	Canada
Sour Minnows		Harrison Atkins	United States
Tokyo Burst: Crime City		Eiji Uchida	Japan
Unidentified Murder		Kwok Ka-Hei, Jack Lee Chun-Kit	Hong Kong

=== New Flesh Competition ===
English title	Original title	Director(s)	Production country
After School	Straf	Merijn Scholte Albers, Tobias Smeets	Netherlands
Backstage Madness	Shermendelik karnavaly	Amanbek Azhymat	Kyrgyzstan
Big Break		Ian Faria	United States
Mum, I'm Alien Pregnant		THUNDERLIPS	New Zealand
Never After Dark		Dave Boyle	Japan
Penny Lane Is Dead		Mia'kate Russell	Australia
Recluse		Henry Chaisson	United States
Sicko		Aitore Zholdaskali	Kazakhstan
Tight Lettuce	Tissé serré	Harrison Houde	Canada
Unholy Night		Michael Gabriele	Canada
When You Open the Door		Katagiri Eriko	Japan
You Are the Film		Makoto Ueda	Japan

=== International Short Film Competition ===
English title	Original title	Director(s)	Production country
Boyfriend Fish		Martin Ekelund	Sweden
Bruised Sky		Gary Kent	United Kingdom
Dirtmouths		Breehn Burns	United States
Echoes in Time		Gemma Lee	Australia
Exhibit		Lars Bürmann	Germany
Exsanguina		Jonas Brisé	France
Fester		Max Parr	Canada
Happydeal		Les Frères Lopez	France
I Love Your Alter Ego!		Lee Chan-bee	South Korea
Idols		Matt Halsall	South Korea, Japan, United Kingdom
idyll		Austin Cauldwell	United States
Imprint		Ran Jing	United States
The Last Jiangshi		Yu Chih Chieh	China, Hong Kong, Taiwan
Mancave		Fredrik S. Hana	Norway
Manhole		Jake Low	Singapore
Pile On		Hu Lu	China
Purge		Andrew Hamilton	Canada
Reset		Jerry Hsu, Celine Tien	United States
Sam		Catharina Schürenberg	United States
Sleep Through Summer		Erin Mick	Canada
Something Borrowed		Findlay Ironside	Canada
Tamasira		Clare Chong	Singapore, Malaysia
This Is a Zombie Movie		Elizabeth Perla	United States
Tropic		Park Jung-yoon	South Korea
Veterano		Patrick Epino	United States
Wish You Were Dead		Lee Min-hyuk	South Korea

=== Horizon 2026 ===
==== Feature films ====
English title	Original title	Director(s)	Production country
After School	Straf	Merijn Scholte Albers, Tobias Smeets	Netherlands
Attack on Paradise		Bob Colaers	Belgium, Netherlands
Backstage Madness	Shermendelik karnavaly	Amanbek Azhymat	Kyrgyzstan
Bagworm		Oliver Bernsen	United States
Big Break		Ian Faria	United States
Blades of the Guardians	Biāo Rén：Fēng Qǐ Dàmò	Yuen Woo-ping	China, Hong Kong
Bowels of Hell		Gustavo Vinagre, Gurcius Gewdner	Brazil
Break Free	Odore! Yakuza	Yu Nakamoto	Japan
Buddy		Casper Kelly	United States
Cape Fear		Amanda Marsalis, Jonathan van Tulleken	United States
Captured!	Tore!	Koichi	Japan
Colony	Gunche	Yeon Sang-ho	South Korea
Drag		Raviv Ullman, Greg Yagolnitzer	United States
The Eyes	Nundongja	Yeom Ji-ho	South Korea
The Fox		Dario Russo	Australia
The Glorious Dead		Toby Poser, John Adams	United States
God Skin		Paween Purijitpanya	Thailand
The Journey to Gyeongju		Kim Mi-jo	South Korea
Kung Fu	Gong Fu	Giddens Ko	Taiwan
The Last Footage		Arkar Soe Oo	Myanmar
The Last Temptation of Becky		Jenn Wexler	United States, United Kingdom
The Leader		Michael Gallagher	Canada, United States
Levitating	Para Perasuk	Wregas Bhanuteja	Indonesia, Singapore, France
Motherwitch	Δωδεκάμερον	Minos Papas	Cyprus, North Macedonia, United States
The Mouths	Kuchi Ni Kansuru Enquete	Takashi Shimizu	Japan
Mum, I'm Alien Pregnant		THUNDERLIPS	New Zealand
The Mutation	Sa-rang-eui-tan-saeng	Shin Su-won	South Korea
Nameless	Nanashi	Hideo Jojo	Japan
Never After Dark		Dave Boyle	Japan
Niko		Julien Birban Levy	South Korea
Penny Lane Is Dead		Mia'kate Russell	Australia
Recluse		Henry Chaisson	United States
The Samurai and the Prisoner		Kiyoshi Kurosawa	Japan
Sicko		Aitore Zholdaskali	Kazakhstan
The Specials		Eiji Uchida	Japan
Suzuki=Bakudan		Akira Nagai	Japan
Teenage Sex and Death at Camp Miasma		Jane Schoenbrun	United States
Trauma Or, Monsters All		Larry Fessenden	United States
Tristes Tropiques	Seulpeun-Yeoldae	Park Hoon-jung	South Korea
Tunnels: Sun in the Dark	Dia Dao: Mat Troi Trong Bong Toi	Chuyen Bui Thac	Vietnam
Los Vampires		Craig Mitchell	United States
Village of Eight Gravestones	YatsuhakaMura	Takashi Shimizu	Japan
We're Nothing At All		Herman Yau	Hong Kong
Wind Breaker		Kentaro Hagiwara	Japan
You Are the Film		Makoto Ueda	Japan

==== Short films ====
English title	Original title	Director(s)	Production country
175		Sepehr Nosrati	Sweden
The 5 Second Rule		Invisible Friends Collective	Armenia
Algorithm		Lena Isabella Deisenberger	Austria
L'Ami raton		Rémi Fréchette	Canada
Angels		Sam Mandich	United States
Animalies	Divocina vola !	Katerina Karhankova, Marek Naprstek	Czechia
Avant de rentrer...		Arthur Bonneau	France
Best Friends with the Devil		Hugo de Sousa	United States
Boyfriend Fish	Utan Efter Med	Martin Ekelund	Sweden
Breeder		Sapphire Sandalo	United States
Bruised Sky		Gary Kent	United Kingdom
The Candle		Ren Ariel Sano	United States
Capitaine Magique		William Tran	Canada
Cardigan!		Aled Owen	United Kingdom
Ce qui se passe sous les cimes		Ludovic Brillon	Canada
Ceiling King		Mats Udd	Sweden
Chaar Diwaari		Syed Shadan	India
CHÄIR		Chris McInroy	United States
Cherubs		Pietro Zuercher, Anna Pieri Zuercher	Switzerland
Claddah		Anna Drezen	United States
Clube de Tricot		Diogo Abrantes, João Rito	Portugal
Collateral Damage		Matt Farren	United States
Le Collectionneur		Aude Bolte	Canada
The Company Card		Myles Hodder	Canada
The Corridor	Le Corridor	Mathieu Samson	Canada
Dagnabbit!		Jason Sheedy, Joshua David Matthews	United States
Day of the Dad		James III	United States
Dirtmouths		Breehn Burns	United States
DJ Bouche (Le Director's Daft Cut)		Dominic Asselin	Canada
Echoes in Time		Gemma Lee	Australia
The End Is at Hand		Japhet E. Velazquez	United States
Exhibit		Lars Bürmann	Germany
Exit		Jérémie Dagenais, Victor Watier-Berthiaume	Canada
Exsanguina		Jonas Brisé	France
Face Thief		Yuta Shimotsu	Japan
The Fated Hour		Peter Hengl	United States, Austria
Flavor of the Month		Nathan Xia	United States
Flowers Bloom When Touched		Priyanka Krishnan	United States, India
Fu		Peyton Elizabeth Lee	United States
Goodbye, Monster		Luke Barnett	United States
HappyDeal		Alexis Lopez	France
Headphones		Stephen Arriagada	Australia
Horse Fly		Alex Park	United States
How to: Make a Pizza on Hypnosis		Fred Lavigne	Canada
I Love Your Alter Ego!		Lee Chan-bee	South Korea
Idols		Matt Halsall	Japan, South Korea, United Kingdom
Idyll		Austin Cauldwell	United States
Imago		Mark Steger	United States
Imprint		Ran Jing	United States
In and Out of the Hornbeam Maze		Tomas Stark	Sweden
Jingle Jangle		Sionne Elise	United States
Kakek		Sven Peetoom	Netherlands
Kill Ada	Sha Si Ai Da	Cai Kunyu	China
KPOP Smoothie		Haneol Lee	United States
Lasagna Run		James Livitski	Canada
The Last Jiangshi	Mo Dai Jiang Shi	Yu Chih Chieh	Taiwan, China, Hong Kong
The Man That I Wave At		Ben S. Hyland	United Kingdom
Mancave		Fredrik S. Hana	Norway
Manon		Maria Belen Person Kalauz	Canada
May I		Henri Cheung	Canada
My Blue Heaven		Mia Gueli, Alegria Bishop Saldana	Canada
Needle		Sofie Somoroff	United States
The New Flesh	Novo Corpo	Luciana Malavasi	Brazil, Portugal
Night Whispers		Adrian Ramírez León	United Kingdom
Noise of Waves	Szum fal	Tomasz Wróbel	Poland
Pandémonium Épisode 1 et 8		Jimmy Genest Pettigrew	Canada
The Parrot		Mathieu Fortin	Canada
Partys de famine		Fred Lavigne	Canada
Phase IV - A Poetic Remix		DJ XL5	Canada, United States
The Pigs Underneath		Charlie Dennis	United Kingdom
Pile On	Die Luo Han	Hu Lu	China
Ping Pong		Simone Emolo	Italy
Please and Thank You		Hal Kirkland	United States
Le potager secret de Clitorin		Fred Lavigne	Canada
Primus le Robot		Max Delagrave	France
Rebrand		Edoardo Ranaboldo	United States
Redneck		Alexandria Basso	United States
Reset		Jerry Hsu, Celine Tien	United States
The Rib Woman		Yuta Shimotsu	Japan
Le Salon funéraire		Dominique Lortie	Canada
Sam		Catharina Schürenberg	Germany, United States
Scissors		Hannah Alline	United States
Scorching	Dan Chen Ri	Wang Beidi	China
Screen of the Dead		Martin Bruyère	Canada
Season's Greetings		Michael Dougherty	United States
A Shadow in the Corner of the Room		Mercies May	United States
Shibuya Underground, Sasebo Evolution		Narushi Takeda	Japan
Sleep Tight		Grace Presse	United States
The Soaker		Siana Marquis-Bilquard, Julianna La Rosa	Canada
Soulmate		Jens-Julius Dall	Denmark
Speedy!		Oh Ji-in	South Korea
Strange Egg		Liv Mershon	United States
Suzie, Vampiresse		Kevin Miclette	Canada
Tamasira		Claire Chong	Singapore, Malaysia
Term		Chadrick Preuss	United States
This House That Bears No Fruit		Chantal Leong	Canada
This Is a Zombie Movie		Elizabeth Perla	United States
Timber		Dominic Asselin	Canada
Tongue		Lim Da-seul	South Korea
Tornado, in Loving Memory		David Connor	Canada, United States
Tropic		Park Jung-yoon	South Korea
The Two Year Rule		Carly Balestreri	Canada
Ugh	Ai Ni Ma	Scarlett Wang Yuan	China, United States
Ultraviolet Damage		Pola Rader	Germany
Veterano		Patrick Epino	United States
Vomit		Roi Cydulkin	United States
We Will Follow the Wind	Tai Feng Jiang Luo Zhi Qian	Demon Wong	France, China, Hong Kong
Weak in the Knees		Shivers & Viking	United States
Wish You Were Dead		Lee Min-hyuk	South Korea
A Woman Like This		James Kenward	Germany
You Deserve More!		Béla Baptiste	France, United States

=== Animation Plus ===
==== Feature films ====
English title	Original title	Director(s)	Production country
Blaise	Les Sauvages	Dimitri Planchon, Jean-Paul Guigue	France
Bliss: Beyond the Edge of Time	Ji Le	Kevin Geiger, Leo Liao, Jo Jo Hwang, Liu Yu Shu, Jade Lien, Chiu Li Wei	Taiwan
Born in the Jungle	Joyeuse Jungle!	Edmunds Jansons	Czechia, Poland, Latvia
Cherry and Virgin		Masanao Kawajiri	Japan
Cocoon: One Summer of Girlhood		Yukimitsu Ina	Japan
Grotesqqque		Atsushi Nishigori	Japan
Hayop Ka!		Avid Liongoren	Philippines
Jim Queen	Jim Queen à la recherche de la Chloroqueer	Nicolas Athane, Marco Nguyen	France
A New Dawn	花緑青が明ける日に	Yoshitoshi Shinomiya	Japan
Papaya		Priscilla Kellen	Brazil
Redline		Takeshi Koike	Japan
Sekiro: No Defeat		Kenichi Kutsuna	Japan
Spacetime Chronicles		Stefano Bertelli	Italy
Zsazsa Zaturnnah		Avid Liongoren	France, Philippines

==== Short films ====
English title	Original title	Director(s)	Production country
20001 An Earth Odyssey		Haruki Kasugamori	Japan
Ambivalent Garden		Nagomi Ueno	Japan
Bangungot		Jam Lising, Oliver Abaño	Philippines
Beasts of Death	Bestias de la Muerte)	Sandra Powers	United States, Mexico, Peru
Broc!	Xi Lan Hua Shi Bian	Wong Chung-Him, Calvin Woo	Hong Kong
Calesita		El Sike	Argentina
Cosmonauts		Leo Cernic	Italy, Slovenia
Cut	Ka	Zheng Yinxuan	China
Don't Dodge Life		Taka Yuki	Japan
Dust of the Simulacrum	Sazin No Nakade	Eit Mistufuchi	Japan
Echo		Asuka Dokai	Japan
The End of the End		Junar Kim	United Kingdom, South Korea
Entelechy	Entelequia	Marcos Sánchez	Chile
Fingerbang		Kim Yeon-woo	South Korea
Five Orphans		Sarina Nihei	France, Japan
Foxing: Kitsuné-tsuki	Kitsune-tsuki	Takeru Shinuzuka	Japan
Future Kid Takara Episode 1 – The Child from the Future		Yuta Sano	Japan
Haru-tsuge Fish and Fu-rai Boy: Tsuri-bari Fish Caught in Summer Grass		Takeshi Yashiro	Japan
In the Beginning		Ala Nunu	Spain, Poland, Portugal
Isle Navigator: The Buried Baby		Fish Wang, Yang Ta Ying	Taiwan
Jeem 1983		Jorj Abou Mhaya	Lebanon
Kinuginu no Hanayuki		Naoya Kurisu	Japan
Kosmogonia		Karolina Chablier	Belgium, France, Poland, Portugal
The Last Faith	Zui Hou Xiang Deng Jiao	Liu Yu Shu	Taiwan
The Lovers		Alice Mao, Sophia Paez	United States
Murmure	Nan Nan Di Yu	Yu Jinhong, Wang Ziyu Z	China
My Killer Erotic Video		Seo Sae-rom, Isaac Bae	South Korea
One, Two, Three, Four, Five, Six	Miao Miao	Lai Yingdan	United States, China
Perfect City: The Mushroom	Wan Mei Zhi Cheng: Mo Gu	Zhou Shengwei	United States, China
Pest	Chong	Lv Xinheng	China
Sortie		Philip Wan	Hong Kong
Soul Kitchen		Kim Hak-hyun	Japan, South Korea
Trading Cards		Radheya Jang	Australia, United Kingdom
Water's Time Slice	Shui De Shi Jian Qie Pian	He Jiaxuan	China
Where My Father Remains		Yasuteru Ohno	Japan

=== Documentaries from the Edge ===
English title	Original title	Director(s)	Production country
Black Zombie		Maya Annik Bedward	Canada
The Origin of Ultraman		Hiroshi Nakamura, Kazutaka Yoshida	Japan
Rubberhead: The Life & Monsters of Steve Johnson		Nick Taylor	United States
The Seoul Guardians	Seoul-ui bam	Kim Jong-woo, Kim Shin-wan, Cho Chul-young	South Korea
Ultraman: "Ultra Operation No. 1"		Hajime Tsuburaya	Japan

=== Fantasia Underground ===
==== Feature films ====
English title	Original title	Director(s)	Production country
Castration Movie Chapter III		Louise Weard	Canada
Dance Freak		Alan Resnick, Robby Rackleff	United States
Godhead		Mark H. Rapaport	United States, United Kingdom
I Love Paris		Nicky Murphy	Australia, United Kingdom
Insectasy		Angus Silver	Canada
Matapanki		Diego Mapache Fuentes	Chile
Our Effed Up World		Alice Maio Mackay	Australia
The Peril at Pincer Point		Jake Kuhn, Noah Stratton-Twine	United Kingdom, Slovakia
When You Open the Door		Eriko Katagiri	Japan

==== Short films ====
English title	Original title	Director(s)	Production country
And Then You See a Ghost		Matisse ApSimon-Megens, Amelia Izmanki	Canada
Avale		Hugo Loiseleux, Elisa Hazebrouck	France
Cosmonauts		Leo Cernic	Italy, Slovenia
Dream Synth		Ryley O'Byrne	Canada
Fuck Face		Dean Puckett	United Kingdom
I Walked Through the Wall		Pablo Larcuen	Spain, United States
Manhole		Jake Low	Singapore
Papertowel Maxipad		Madeline Babuka Black	United States
Pick It Till It Bleeds		Christina Dovolis, Tavis Putnam	Canada
Pimple	Borbulha	Fernando Alle	Portugal
Plato's Goon Cave: A Primer		Hannah Epstein	Canada
La Rabia		Daniela López Moreno	Colombia
Sequential	Sequencial	Bruno Caetano	France, Poland, Italy, Portugal
Shitting a Penis		Sam Morgan	Canada
Skin of Sadness	Hüznün Derisi	Hasan Ege Çaliskan	Netherlands, Turkiye
Softer, Softest		Olivia Norquay	Canada
A Stable Marriage		Josephine Decker	United States
Tainted Love		Gye Young-ho	South Korea
They Know		Elliot Long	United States
Wet Proofs of the Flesh		Julia Hendrickson	Canada
Yucky Guy		Alan Resnick	United States

=== The Fantastic Weekends of Quebec Cinema ===
==== Feature films ====
English title	Original title	Director(s)	Production country
The Galactic Ghoul		Simon Harrisson	Canada
Mouvement Deluxe		Mathieu Handfield	Canada
Parallel Gazes	Les regards parallèles	Vincent Bonin-Arena	Canada
The Parking Spot	La Place	Louis Godbout	Canada
Romin		Jassen Charron, Anthony Dionne	Canada
Saturnides	Les Saturnides	Neegan Trudel	Canada
Someone's Daughter		Wiebke von Carolsfeld	Canada
Tight Lettuce	Tissé serré	Harrison Houde	Canada

==== Short films ====
English title	Original title	Director(s)	Production country
24 janvier		Francis Theberge	Canada
À fleur de cendres		Florence Audet	Canada
Accusé de réception		Julien Grandmont	Canada
Acouphènes		Louis Mercier	Canada
Action Bog		Winston Hacking	Canada
Aïe!		Valérie Blien	Canada
Alliage		Neeko Beaulieu	Canada
Altérer		Sounjata Phojo	Canada
Antifonctionnelle		Leonie Savard	Canada
L'Appel des sœurs		Briana Legault	Canada
Après le close		François Lalonde	Canada
Aucun acteur dans un film de Tom Cruise		Francis Theberge, Julien Sicre	Canada
Auditoria		Evgeny Patvakanov	Canada
Avant l'aurore		Tiago Gerbasi	Canada
Avant la mort		Edgar Fritz	Canada
Birdcall		Justin Calandriello	Canada
La Blatte à battre		Angélique Mathilde Gasse	Canada
The Bleeding Truth		Jérémy Guertin	Canada
La Bleue		Alex Trépanier, Thomas Robillard	Canada
Bliss		Greg Doble	Canada
Le Bonhomme pendu		Félix-Antoine Bénard	Canada
Bonjour Amour!		Mathieu Samson	Canada
Bouge Danse Meurs		Benjamin Perrault	Canada
Bougement printemps		Geneviève Le Guerrier-Aubry	Canada
Une brèche		Jean-François Leblanc	Canada
c-r-a-b-e-s		Daphné Leduc-Laprise	Canada
Cafard		Léo Maisonneuve	Canada
Café Apocalypse		Flora Nwakobi	Canada
Cannapluggageddon		Loudvic Beaulne	Canada
Carry On!		Karla Velázquez	Canada, Colombia
Chance Encounters		Jacob Arsenault	Canada
La Chandleur		Victor Lesage	Canada
Chrysalide		Alexandre Bruneau Genesse, Martin Adam	Canada
Cintres		Stéphanie Marcotte	Canada
Clémentine		Xavier Lacasse	Canada
Cochenille		Kelly-Ann Thuot	Canada
Cockroach		Daniel Watchorn, Paolo Mancini	Canada
Cocktail Macabre		Florence Saravo	Canada
Cœuer de bestiole		Élyse Prud'homme	Canada
Congé		Bryen Akueson	Canada
Constructs		Maggie McPhee	Canada
Cuisson Explosive		Xavier Tamajon	Canada
Daddy Lazarus		Pablo Escobar Tuduri	Canada
Dance with the Dealer		Adam Blackie	Canada
Dans le frigo		Nadia Zergoug	Canada
Dans mon cœur plaintif es entrée		Rémy Dolbec-Pilon	Canada
A Day in My Life...as a Penguin		Rosemary Nault	Canada
Démisson		Charles Brault	Canada
Le Dernier répie		Andréanne Poisson-Robert, Joël-Arthur Tremblay	Canada
Le Dernier souhait		Kimberley Ann Surin	Canada
dns grtt		mshl	Canada
The Dog Who Stopped the War: Reimagined	Kino Montréal présente La guerre des tuques : Réimaginée	Charles Parisé, Frédéric Barbusci, Isabelle Giroux, Camille Théberge, Kevin Miclette, Hippolyte Guyon, Antoine Symoens, Andréanne Poisson-Robert, Rémi Fréchette, Noah Lebel-Turcotte, Suzanne Cordeau-Andrews, Justin Leblanc, Dany Foster, Gabriel Desgagnés-Saez, Juliette S. Turcot, Marc-André Morisette, Jimmy G. Pettigrew, Rita Faid, Thierry Mercure	Canada
Dolly Baby: Rhythm and Flesh		Bouchera Tahraoui	Canada
A Drawing of Fire		Daniel Reid	Canada
Dumpling		Catherine Verreault	Canada
Duotone Handshake		Winston Hacking	Canada
Eau de lavage		Raphaëlle D'Amours	Canada
Élixir		Maëva Gravel	Canada
Emoji		Minh Quan Hoang	Canada
Empreintes		Albane Fanny	Canada
En direct		Sami Yani Chikh	Canada
Les Engrenages		Kané Beignet	Canada
'L'Étrange Noël de Sylvaine		Jeremy Glavac	Canada
Everything on Land with Bones Is a Fish		Antonia Novakovich	Canada
Extremely Small Claims Court		Ray Resvick	Canada
La Face cachée		Sophie Wang	Canada
Face-Off		Pascal Chaumont	Canada
Fantasme		Zoé Garand-Teixeira	Canada
The Feast (For My Beloved Son)		Sara Sofia Gonzalez Lopez	Canada
Female Gaze		Laura Lubin	Canada
Fish Out of Water		Corey Nikolaus	Canada
Fix		Patrick Lemay	Canada
The Fixers		Guy Lampron	Canada
Fluorescent		Stephanie Lamontagne	Canada
Fog		Mariano Franco	Canada
La fois où mon ami Charles a serré la main à Oliver Stone		Marc-André Morissette	Canada
For the Night		Giuliano Musacchio	Canada
The Fox and the Grapes		Cristina Macchiagodena, Emily Wolak	Canada
Frankentwink		Spencer Dorsey	Canada
Les Grandes roues		Thomas Dufour	Canada
La Hère		Frédéric Chalté	Canada
L'Hermite du désert		Sophie Touyâa	Canada
Hitchhiker		Charlie Agadjanian	Canada
Home Security		Ethan Gabert Doyon	Canada
I'm in Love with a Stripper		Julie Phan	Canada
Ice Cold Beer		Devon Mussett, Joey Lopez	Canada
Intraluz		Lara Sofia Valenzuela, Margot Flores Torre	Canada
It Is Called the Vailian Theory		Francis Theberge	Canada
J'attends (tout le temps)		Emmanuelle Lacombe	Canada
Jabber		Aubert Sénéchal	Canada
Jusqu'à ce que l'orage nous sépare		Thierry Grandbois	Canada
Kid's Show		Alex Apostolidis	Canada
King		Morgan Henry	Canada
Kitchen & Knives		Xin Ran Liu, Lydie Hwang	Canada
Lab Rat		Eric Bent	Canada
Last Call		Nicolas Quiroz, Patrick Farley	Canada
LegoMan		David Dufresne-Denis	Canada
Letter to Celestial		Wawa Li, Sinéad O'Halloran	Canada
Linda! La reine du ring		Marco Di Bennardo	Canada
Living Grounds	Sol vivant	Émile Lavoie	Canada
Le Livraison		Alix Desoomer	Canada
Loop d'une forêt enchantée		Amélia Slama	Canada
Los Hombres no lloran		Bastian Orellana-Lauri	Canada
The Man with the Golden Wrapper		Jennifer Seguin	Canada
Marché Locale		Étienne Despatie	Canada
Massacrez les louves		Philippe Cormier	Canada
Memories in 1/24 on 35mm	Souvenirs en 1/24 sur 35mm	Francis Theberge	Canada
Merci Charlotte!		Hadi Iraqi	Canada
Le Meunier		Hubert Dessureault	Canada
Moi, l'autre		Xavier Bergeron	Canada
Monochrome		Justice Rutikara	Canada
Montée de lait		Romane Desproges	Canada
Mother, My Child		Vjosana Shkurti	Canada
Le Mystère de l'abbé Metz		Félix Brouillet-Desrosiers	Canada
Nancy		Jenny Loudon	Canada
Neighbors		Andre Bendahan	Canada
Nice		Paul Villenave, Dylan Posgate	Canada
No One Goes to the Movies Anymore		Jade Giang	Canada
Nominal		Keiran Arscott	Canada
Non		Maël Thibodeau	Canada
Numaru		Mélodie Garand	Canada
L'Odyssée de la boucle		Benjamin Lussier	Canada
On Air		Joys Sekpon	Canada
One Day: Look at the Sky		Al Raif	Canada
Pass		Jon Ramirez	Canada
Passion machinale		Juliette Taylor, Justin Taylor	Canada
Per Te		Justin Genest	Canada
The Perfect Match		Jordan Marini, Emma Elizabeth	Canada
Un petit vent frais		Alexandre Pelletier	Canada
Petits papillons		Coco Baudelle	Canada
The Pichenotte	La Pichenotte	Antoine Boulanger	Canada
Un pipi dans la ruelle		Camille Pépin	Canada
Postcard Potholder		Chris Sagovac	Canada
Prophétesse		Océane Buxton	Canada
Le Puzzle		Omar Serhane	Canada
La Pyrale du quartier		Évelyne Brown	Canada
Quelque chose de beau		Olivier A. Dubois	Canada
The Quiet End		Hamed AleAli	Canada
La Religion de la mante		Romane Desproges	Canada
REM		Ori Peer	Canada
Rémanence		Nebojsa Kovacevic	Canada
Reminiscence		Martin Adam, Alexandre Bruneau Genesse	Canada
Retour à Tadou		Jean-Nicolas Bertouille-Blais	Canada
The Return Solution		Nathan Dubé	Canada
Ricochet		Daniel Reid	Canada
Ricochets		Mathieu Dodier	Canada
Rizz-o-thon		Noah Lebel-Turcotte	Canada
Roméo et son corps		Fred Gervais	Canada
Routine		Abo Fall	Canada
Rupture numérique		Jollan Boivin	Canada
La Saison des prix Nobel		Michel Cordey	Canada
Sara & Fatima		Romy Boutin St-Pierre, Karima Zouhair, Nada Cheddadi	Canada
Saudade		Arghir Stamati	Canada
Le savoir-faire du cannabis		Jonathan Gaudreau	Canada
Serenity		Frank Tremblay	Canada
Shards		Conner Nikides	Canada
Shush		Maude Robillard	Canada
Le Silence blanc		Pierre-Luc Morinville	Canada
Skeleton Crew		Sam Félix	Canada
Sleep Through Summer		Erin Mick	Canada
Snowbird		Olivier Lacroix	Canada
La Soirée d'avant		Roberto Lyonnais	Canada
Soirée de filles		Nova Benny	Canada
Sophie sent l'swing		André Turpin	Canada
Still Moving		Rui Ting Ji	Canada
Stupéfiant colis		Guylaine Marcoux	Canada
Stupid Stories and Squandered Love		Owen Coughlan	Canada
Tall Tales of Terror		Guillaume Boivin	Canada
A Taste of My Own		Penelope Johansen	Canada
The Taste of Your Scales	Le goût de tes écailles	Rafaël Beauchamp	Canada
Tears Fall Underwater		Leila Khalilzadeh	Canada
Teeth Don't Have Sex		Anita Monteiro	Canada
Thank You for Your Time		Christian Kadnikov	Canada
Tiny Rejections		Matisse ApSimon-Megens, Nicky Fournier	Canada
Tomber dans la main de Morphée		Léa April	Canada
Toujours l'hiver		Benjamin Thomae	Canada
Trois mots		Franie-Éléonore Bernier	Canada
Trou du diable		Isaac Gervais Trudel	Canada
The Unmaking		McKay Halcro	Canada
v4.04		Klara Barras	Canada
Vagabond		Marco F. Correia	Canada
Vera		John Harbour	Canada
Viscosities	Viscocités	Magdalena Lang	Canada
Western Blot!		Ashlee Gonsalves	Canada
Whiskey et frénésie		Cédric Legault	Canada
Within Only Ourselves		Allison Wolanyk	Canada
WOP (With Out Papers)		Maya De Marco	Canada
Xananax		Lawrence Dupuis	Canada
Yoko		David Minh Nguyen	Canada
The Zipper		Jonelle Larouche	Canada

=== Fantasia Retro ===
English title	Original title	Director(s)	Production country
City War		Sun Chung	Hong Kong
The Delinquent		Chang Cheh, Kuei Chih-Hung	Hong Kong
Forty Deuce		Paul Morrissey	United States
Gozu		Takashi Miike	Japan
Hayop Ka!		Avid Liongoren	Philippines
Hong Kong Godfather		Wang Lung-wei	Hong Kong
Metal Messiah		Tibor Takács	Canada
Pontypool		Bruce McDonald	Canada
Redline	Reddo rain	Takeshi Koike	Japan
Studio Q	Misterio	Marcela Fernández Violante	Mexico
Thrilling Bloody Sword		Chang Hsin-Yi	Taiwan

=== Septentrion Shadows ===
==== Feature films ====
English title	Original title	Director(s)	Production country
Ancestral Beasts		Tim Riedel	Canada
Black Zombie		Maya Annik Bedward	Canada
Freaks Part II		Adam Stein, Zach Lipovsky	Canada
Home Bodies		Casey Walker	Canada
Insectasy		Angus Silver	Canada
Junction Row		Ashlea Wessel	Canada
Permanent Damage		Seth A. Smith	Canada
Pontypool		Bruce McDonald	Canada
A Safe Distance		Gloria Mercer	Canada
Unholy Night		Michael Gabriele	Canada

==== Short films ====
English title	Original title	Director(s)	Production country
Bagman		Connor Gaston, Vaughn Gaston	Canada
Blood, Sweat and Tears		Spencer Glassman	Canada
Ends Meat		Alex Ateah	Canada
The Fan Man		Austin Hutchings	Canada
Fester		Max Parr	Canada
Frequency		Lauren Andrews	Canada
Friends Like Us		Ray Savaya	Canada
It's Not Me		Cameron Veitch, Robert Kemp	Canada
The Last DIY Show		Jo Gaffney	Canada
Lost Wax		Omorose Osagie	Canada, Nigeria
Man Eating Pussy		Emily Lawson	Canada
A Mighty Poison		Kyle Marchen	Canada
Purge		Andrew Hamilton	Canada
Something Borrowed		Findlay Ironside	Canada
Walrus Inc.		Sarah Swire	Canada

=== Genres du Pays ===
English title	Original title	Director(s)	Production country
The Confessional	Le Confessionnal	Robert Lepage	Canada
Cul-de-$ac		Jean-Mathieu (Jib) Bérubé, Carlo Harrietha	Canada
Full Blast		Rodrigue Jean	Canada
The Mob	La Gammick	Jacques Godbout	Canada
Possible Worlds		Robert Lepage	Canada
State Park	Académie de Vacances 2	Rafal Zielinski	Canada
The Wolves	Les loups	Sophie Deraspe	Canada

=== My First Fantasia ===
==== Feature films ====
English title	Original title	Director(s)	Production country
Aurelie Laflamme's Diary	Le journal d'Aurélie Laflamme	Christian Laurence	Canada
Born in the Jungle	Joyeuse Jungle!	Edmunds Jansons	Czechia, Poland, Latvia
The Flayed, Part 3	Les Écorchés, partie III	Luca Jalbert	Canada
Papaya		Priscilla Kellen	Brazil

==== Short films ====
English title	Original title	Director(s)	Production country
L'Aigle et le roitelet		Jadoul Paul	Belgium, France
ALT		Jaymee Abel	Canada
Un arbre?		Chloé Bouffard	Canada
Auvent		Mélodie Casavant	Canada
L'Aventure de Toto		Chloé Bouffard	Canada
Avolavit		Benjamin Trudel	Canada
Baião d'intérieurs		Héloïse Dorsan-Rachet	France
Bleu à Paupières		Camille Pépin	Canada
Bubbles Neverland		Jung Yun-a	South Korea
Cabaret Peterson		Chloé Alix-Joly	Canada
Chtonk!		Mélissa Desrosiers	Canada
Crashcat		Daniel Kruse, Brian Ellis	United States, Sweden
Dancing in the Rain		Yeh Chao Chun	Taiwan
Dans l'jus		Sophie-Louise Carter	Canada
Les Égarés		Alexanne Dicaire Fry	Canada
Esquisses sur glace		Marion Auvin	Belgium, France
Facteur vent		Rémy Rousseau	Canada
First Flight		Adrián Jaffé	Germany
Foools		Seo Kim, Steve Manale	Canada, United States
Full Nest		Elena Walf	Germany
Géraldine et Spaghetti		Ève Gingras	Canada
La Grange de Noëlle		Pascale Hecquet	Belgium, France
Green Apple?		Tal S. Shamir	United States
Il n'y a qu'un poisson dans l'eau		Julia Ragot, André Yu, Gabrielle Montané, Ilona Laouchez, Hector De Ghaisne De Bournmont, Florent Delay	France
Mitti		Delwyn Jude Remedios	India
Mole, Mole!		Su Rui Rung	Taiwan
Nouvelle lune		Fée Chagnon	Canada
Over Yonder		Rachel James Carrière	Canada
Poisson nuage		Noé Garcia	Belgium, France
Recharged		Elizabeth Catwell	Canada
Sannah Mania		Emmy Centeno	Canada
Sunspark		Danny Bourque	United States
Trouvé		Juliette Baily	Belgium, France
When the Snow Melts		Kim Eun-young	South Korea
When the Tide Comes		Fet-Nat Bailly	United Kingdom

== Awards ==
Juried award winners were announced during the festival, and audience award winners were announced on August 5 after the festival's conclusion.

Career achievement honours were presented to Don Hertzfeldt as the recipient of the Indie Maverick Award, Bruce McDonald as the recipient of the Canadian Trailblazer Award, and Robert Lepage and Louise Portal as recipients of the Denis-Héroux Award.

=== Cheval Noir Competition ===
Award	Recipient	Film
Best Film	Hanna Bergholm	Nightborn (Yön lapsi)
Best Director	Kasper Kalle	No Rest for the Wicked
Best Screenplay	Edwin, Eka Kurniawan, Daishi Matsunaga	Sleep No More (Monster Pabrik Rambut)
Best Cinematography	Fabrizio La Palombara	Ferine
Best Editing	Soichi Ueno	Beasts Clutching at Straws
Best Score	Pino Donaggio	Ferine
Best Performance	Seidi Haarla	Nightborn (Yön lapsi)
Best Performance	Pilou Asbæk	No Rest for the Wicked
Special Mention of the Jury: Full Ensemble	Hot Spot	
Special Mention of the Jury: Special Practical Effects	Jabrik Hellworker, Benedictus A.K., Rizal, Issei Oda	Sleep No More (Monster Pabrik Rambut)

=== New Flesh Competition ===
Award	Recipient	Film
Best First Feature	Thunderlips	Mum, I'm Alien Pregnant
Special Mention of the Jury: Best Performance	Dilnaz Kurmangali, Ayan Utepburgen	Sicko

=== International Short Film Competition ===
Award	Recipient	Film
Best Film	Fredrik S. Hana	Mancave
Best Director	Yu Chih Chieh	The Last Jiangshi
Best Screenplay	Kyu-eun Park, Min-hyuk Lee	Wish You Were Dead
Best Cinematography	Jung Da Bin	Tropic
Best Editing		Dirtmouths
Best Score		The Last Jiangshi
Best Performance	Ensemble	Pile On
Best Performance	Jon Jon Briones	Veterano
Special Mention of the Jury	Jake Low	Manhole

=== Satoshi Kon Award for Excellence in Animation ===
Award	Recipient	Film
Best Animated Feature	Jean-Paul Guigue, Dimitri Planchon	Blaise
Special Mention of the Jury	Masanao Kawajiri	Cherry and Virgin
Best Short Film, Gold	Jorj Abou Mhaya	Jeem 1983
Best Short Film, Silver	Kim Yeon-woo	Fingerbang
Best Short Film, Bronze	Junar Kim	The End of the End

=== Northern Excellence Award for Canadian Filmmaking ===
Award	Recipient	Film
Northern Excellence Award	Maya Annik Bedward	Black Zombie
Special Mention of the Jury	Angus Silver	Insectasy

=== AQCC ===
Award	Recipient	Film
AQCC Award	Gurcius Gewdner, Gustavo Vinagre	Bowels of Hell
Special Mention of the Jury	Wregas Bhanuteja	Levitating

=== Poulain Noir ===
Award	Recipient	Film
Best Short Film, Gold	Fêt-Nat Bailly	When the Tide Comes
Best Short Film, Silver	Hector de Ghaisne de Bourmont, Florent Delay, Ilona Laouchez, Gabrielle Montané, Julia Ragot, André Yu	Il n'y a qu'un poisson dans l'eau
Best Short Film, Bronze	Marion Auvin	Esquisses sur glace
Special Mention of the Jury	Seo Kim, Steve Manale	Foools
Special Mention of the Jury	Noé Garcia	Poisson nuage

=== Audience Awards ===
Award	Film	Filmmaker
International Feature, Gold	I Love Paris	Nicky Murphy
International Feature, Silver	No Rest for the Wicked	Kasper Kalle
International Feature, Bronze	Bagworm	Oliver Bernsen
Canadian Feature, Gold	Unholy Night	Michael Gabriele
Canadian Feature, Silver	Castration Movie Chapter III	Louise Weard
Canadian Feature, Bronze	Insectasy	Angus Silver
Canadian Feature, Bronze	A Safe Distance	Gloria Mercer
Animated Feature, Gold	Cherry and Virgin	Masanao Kawajiri
Animated Feature, Silver	Jim Queen	Nicolas Athane, Marco Nguyen
Animated Feature, Bronze	Zsazsa Zaturnnah	Avid Liongoren
Asian Feature, Gold	Anymart	Yusuke Iwasaki
Asian Feature, Silver	The Specials	Eiji Uchida
Asian Feature, Bronze	Tokyo Burst: Crime City	Eiji Uchida
Quebec Feature, Gold	Tight Lettuce (Tissé serré)	Harrison Houde
Quebec Feature, Silver	Romin	Jassen Charron, Anthony Dionne
Quebec Feature, Bronze	Someone's Daughter	Wiebke von Carolsfeld
Best Documentary	The Seoul Guardians (Seoul-ui bam)	Kim Jong-woo, Kim Shin-wan, Cho Chul-young
International Short, Gold	Bruised Sky	Gary Kent
International Short, Silver	Reset	Gerry Hsu, Celine Tien
International Short, Bronze	Pimple	Fernando Alle
Canadian Short, Gold	Something Borrowed	Findlay Ironside
Canadian Short, Silver	Bagman	Connor Gaston, Vaughn Gaston
Canadian Short, Silver	Man Eating Pussy	Emily Lawson
Canadian Short, Bronze	Sleep Through Summer	Erin Mick
Animated Short, Gold	The Lovers	Alice Mao, Sophia Paez
Animated Short, Silver	Echo	Asuka Dokai
Animated Short, Bronze	Trading Cards	Radheya Jang
Asian Short, Gold	The Last Jiangshi	Yu Chih Chieh
Asian Short, Silver	Tongue	Lim Da-seul
Asian Short, Bronze	Chaar Diwaari	Syed Shadan
Asian Short, Bronze	Wish You Were Dead	Lee Min-hyuk
Quebec Short, Gold	Neighbors	André Bendahan
Quebec Short, Silver	Serenity	Frank Tremblay
Quebec Short, Bronze	Living Grounds (Sol vivant)	Émile Lavoie
Écran fantastique	Suzuki=Bakudan	Akira Nagai
