= No Rest for the Wicked (2026 film) =

- Promotional poster
- Directed by: Kasper Kalle
- Written by: Rasmus Birch; Kasper Kalle
- Based on: Manor by Karl Heinrich Ulrichs
- Produced by: Lars Bredo Rahbek
- Starring: Egor Venned; Pilou Asbæk; Sofia Nolsøe Mikkelsen; Jóhannes Haukur Jóhannesson; Kjartan Hansen
- Cinematography: Jacob Møller
- Edited by: Mark Bukdahl; Mads Michael Olsen
- Music by: Hettarher; Torleik Mortensen; Andreas Tykjær Restorff
- Production companies: Outlier Projects; SF Studios; Truenorth Productions
- Distributed by: SF Studios
- Release dates: July 22, 2026 (Fantasia); September 3, 2026 (Denmark)
- Running time: 103 minutes
- Countries: Denmark; Faroe Islands; Iceland
- Languages: Danish; Faroese

No Rest for the Wicked is a 2026 romantic horror film directed by Kasper Kalle. It stars Pilou Asbæk and Egor Venned. The film is loosely based on the 1884 queer horror short story Manor by Karl Heinrich Ulrichs.

The film premiered on July 22, 2026 at the 30th Fantasia International Film Festival, and was released in Denmark on September 3, 2026. It received positive reviews from critics.

== Premise ==
In the Faroe Islands in 1862, a young fisherman and a traveling whaler begin to form a bond, only for a supernatural force to come upon their village.

== Cast ==
- Pilou Asbæk as Hedge
- Egor Venned as Baldur
- Sofia Nolsøe Mikkelsen as Ásla
- Jóhannes Haukur Jóhannesson as Jákup
- Kjartan Hansen as Súni

== Release ==
The film premiered in-competition at the 30th Fantasia International Film Festival on July 22, 2026. Its North American distribution rights were then acquired by Altered Innocence, for a scheduled 2027 theatrical release.

== Reception ==
On the review aggregator website Rotten Tomatoes, 97% of 30 critics' reviews are positive, with an average rating of 8.4/10.

=== Awards ===
At Fantasia, Kalle won the award for Best Director and Asbæk won the award for Best Performance in the Cheval noir competition, and the film won the Silver Audience Award for international features.

== See also ==
- Queer vampires
