= The Lovers (2026 film) =

2026 Philippine short film

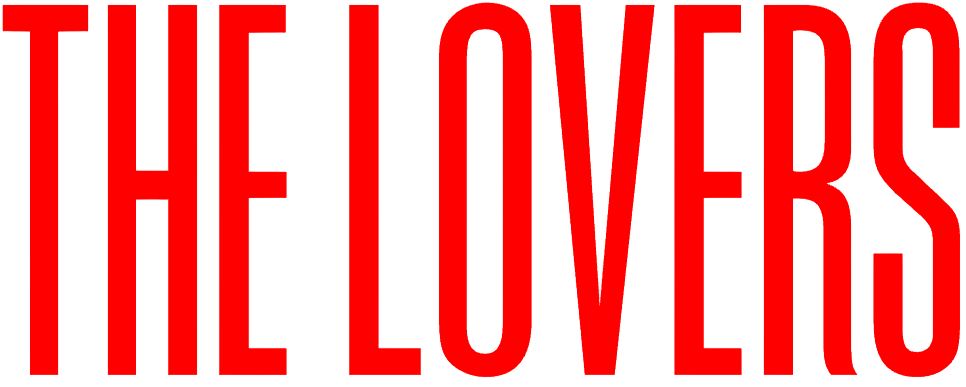
- Directed by: Sophia O. Paez; Alice Mao
- Written by: Alice Mao
- Produced by: Alice Mao
- Starring: Vanille Velasquez; Dawn M. Bennett
- Production company: Studio Heartbreak
- Release dates: May 25, 2026 (Annecy International Animated Film Festival); August 30, 2026 (YouTube)
- Running time: 15 minutes
- Country: Philippines
- Languages: Tagalog; Taglish; English
- Budget: $400,000

The Lovers is a 2026 Philippine independent adult animated short film directed by Sophia O. Paez and Alice Mao. The film was released on YouTube on August 29, 2026.

== Plot ==
The film follows seafood chef Sara Lim Baylon who lives in a world inhabited by various fantastical creatures and works for her family’s restaurant in Manila. Sara was tasked with preparing and serving sea creature Sirena for governor's inaugural dinner at the restaurant, but found herself embroiled in an affair with the creature.

== Voice cast ==
- Sara Lim Baylon voiced by Vanille Velasquez.
- The Sirena voiced by Dawn M. Bennett.

== Production ==
The Lovers was conceived in 2023 by animating duo A. S. Siopao, students of University of Toronto who founded the animation studio Studio Heartbreak. The duo promoted the film online, seeking freelance artists and animators, and received a large number of applications, eventually expanding the studio's team to 20 people. The studio is based in the Philippines, but its team consists of people from countries such as Indonesia, Brazil and the United Kingdom. Aftermath noted that the duo had no experience in animation prior to the development of the film. The Varsity reported that the development of The Lovers took a toll on the duo, with one of them describing it as “pain and suffering”.

On May 9, 2023, a 45-second trailer for The Lovers was released on crowdfunding platform Kickstarter, where the studio set a goal of raising $60,000. In one day, the goal was reached: about 2,400 people raised $160,000 for the film. The studio said the film was in development until the second quarter of 2025 and that support for the film was available through Kickstarter or by purchasing merchandise. By May 30, 2023, the film raised $273,880, four times its goal. The film was the fifth-highest-funded project on Kickstarter in 2023.

The filmmakers said that The Lovers is dubbed in Tagalog and Taglish languages to "immerse the viewer into the unique dynamics of a Filipino family", however, the film is also be available in English to appeal to wider audience. The film is mature and explores themes such as body horror, generational trauma and repression. In an interview with Gayming Magazine, the duo said that the film was influenced by a YouTuber named Masaru, who catches and cooks fish. In July 2023, one of the film's directors told Lifestyle.INQ that Masaru's comments on the ethics of killing influenced their writing. In a September 2023 interview with Comicon.com, Studio Heartbreak said the film was also influenced by film director Satoshi Kon. The work on the film was completed in May 2026, taking almost four years. The film included 10,000 frames, 200 animated shots, 900 storyboards and 200 background paintings.

== Release ==
The Lovers premiered at Annecy International Animated Film Festival from May 23 to 25, 2026, along with other Philippine films. Studio Hearbreak said the film will be released on YouTube for free after the festival, but did not reveal its release date. TheGamer estimated the film to be released in the coming months after August 2026. On July 22, 2026, the film was screened at the 30th Fantasia International Film Festival in Montreal. The film was also screened at HollyShorts Film Festival. The Lovers was released on YouTube on August 29, 2026 and received nearly 400,000 views in two days.

== Reception ==
On August 5, 2026, The Lovers won the Best Animated Short award at 30th Fantasia International Film Festival. After the film's release on YouTube, Isaiah Colbert of Aftermath described its animation as "shockingly polished" and "gorgeous". Charles Hartford of But Why Tho? rated the film a 10 out of 10, describing it as a "compelling, engaging, and mesmerizing story". He noted that the film conveys a lot of story but has little dialogue. Paola Mejia of Lesbicanaries.es described the film as "original and interesting" but "very short", leaving the viewer wanting more. Rafael Bautista of Mega said the film makes a "strong impression thanks to its blend of 2D and 3D animation" as well as its art style, body horror, and generational trauma that Filipino people may relate to.
