= Insectasy =

- Directed by: Angus Silver
- Written by: Angus Silver
- Produced by: Angus Silver; Connor Slatkoff Sharpe
- Starring: Tirion Healy
- Cinematography: James Jeffery
- Edited by: Angus Silver
- Music by: Tom Cepeda
- Production company: Foggy Ocean Pictures
- Release date: July 24, 2026 (Fantasia)
- Running time: 83 minutes
- Country: Canada
- Language: English

Insectasy is a Canadian drama film, written and directed by Angus Silver and released in 2026. The film stars Tirion Healy as Sadie, a young woman exploring her sexual fetish for having insects walking on her skin.

The cast also includes Lyndall Huber, Emmett Roiko, Kelsey Thompson, Jan Roeth, Rand Walsh, Eugenie Frances, Nazik Edil, Ronald Puno, Connor Slatkoff Sharpe, Dustin Finerty, James Jeffery and Sebastien Brotherton in supporting roles.

The film premiered at the 30th Fantasia International Film Festival. It received a special mention from the Northern Excellence Award for Canadian Filmmaking jury, and tied with A Safe Distance for the Bronze Audience Award for Canadian films.

The film is also slated to screen in the Borsos Competition program at the 2026 Whistler Film Festival.
