= Number 37 (film) =

2018 South African thriller film

- Directed by: Nosipho Dumisa
- Screenplay by: Nosipho Dumisa
- Story by: Nosipho Dumisa; Daryne Joshua; Travis Taute
- Produced by: Benjamin Overmeyer; Bradley Joshua
- Starring: Irshaad Ally; Danny Ross; Monique Rockman
- Cinematography: Zenn van Zyl
- Edited by: Simon Beesley
- Music by: James Matthes
- Production company: Gambit Films
- Release dates: 10 March 2018 (SXSW); 1 June 2018 (South Africa)
- Running time: 100 minutes
- Country: South Africa
- Language: Afrikaans
- Box office: $102,657

Number 37 (Afrikaans: Nommer 37) is a 2018 South African crime thriller written and directed by Nosipho Dumisa. It is a remake of Rear Window by Alfred Hitchcock. The film is in Afrikaans and subtitled to English. It was featured at several film festivals including SXSW, the Neuchâtel International Fantastic Film Festival, the Sydney Film Festival, and the Fantasia International Film Festival in Montreal, where it won Best Director. The film follows an injured young man, confined to his apartment, who borrows his girlfriend's binoculars to spy on their neighbours, in which he sees an opportunity to turn their lives around after witnessing a crime.

== Plot ==
Entrapped in his apartment, Randal Hendricks (Irshaad Ally), a recent paraplegic, is gifted binoculars by his devoted girlfriend, Pam (Monique Rockman). However, Randal is in financial debt to Emmie (Danny Ross), a sadistic loan shark, and when he witnesses Lawyer (David Manuel), a powerful criminal, commit murder while observing his neighbours one night, he initiates a treacherous blackmail scheme. With few people to turn to, Randal involves Warren (Ephraim Gordon), his halfwit friend with an unabashed lust for Pam. Despite the varying risks, Randal goes ahead with his plan, and as circumstances become more complicated, Pam is embroiled in the unravelling chain of events. Before long, Gail February (Sandi Schultz), a detective, comes snooping around the neighbourhood, looking for the missing corrupt cop - her partner. As Lawyer begins investigating in order to find his blackmailer, Emmie compounds the pressure of his looming deadline, and Lieutenant February's search draws her ever closer to Randal. With deception and greed around every corner, Randal, who uses a wheelchair, must rely on the physical capabilities of his reluctant girlfriend to see their plan through, putting both of their lives in mortal danger.

== Cast ==
- Irshaad Ally as Randal Hendricks
- Monique Rockman as Pam Ismael
- Danny Ross as Emmie
- Ephraim Gordon as Warren
- David Manuel as Lawyer
- Amrain Ismail-Essop as Alicia
- Sandi Schultz as Lieutenant Gail February
- Elton Andrew as Pastor White
- Deon Lotz as Commander Gavin France
