= Papaya (film) =

2025 Brazilian animated film

- Promotional release poster
- Directed by: Priscilla Kellen
- Written by: Priscilla Kellen
- Produced by: Leticia Friedrich; Priscilla Kellen; Alê Abreu; Lourenço Sant'Anna
- Starring: Aretha Garcia Rollo; Tulipa Ruiz; Maria Vitória Garcia
- Edited by: Elaine Steola
- Music by: Talita Del Collado
- Animation by: Birdo Studio
- Color process: Color
- Production company: Boulevard Films
- Distributed by: Gebeka Films (France); Cajuína Audiovisual (Brazil)
- Release dates: 11 October 2025 (Rio); 15 February 2026 (Berlinale)
- Running time: 74 minutes
- Country: Brazil
- Language: Portuguese

Papaya is a 2025 Brazilian animated adventure film written and directed by Priscilla Kellen, in her directorial debut feature. This film depicts a tiny papaya seed, who is fascinated by the idea of flying.

The film had its world premiere in the Premiere Brazil: Generation at the 2025 Rio de Janeiro International Film Festival on 11 October. It had its International premiere in the Generation Kplus section of the 76th Berlin International Film Festival on 15 February 2026, where it was nominated for the Crystal Bear.

== Summary ==
A small papaya seed journeys across the Amazon, determined to fly and avoid taking root. Through persistence, it discovers the surprising strength of its roots, setting off a change that transforms its world and leads it to its dream in an unusual manner.

== Cast ==
- Aretha Garcia Rollo
- Tulipa Ruiz
- Maria Vitória Garcia

== Release ==
Papaya had its premiere in the Premiere Brazil: Generation at the Rio de Janeiro International Film Festival on 11 October 2025.

It had its International premiere in the Generation Kplus section of the 76th Berlin International Film Festival on 15 February 2026.

Brussels-based Best Friend Forever acquired international rights and Gebeka Films French distribution rights of the film in October 2025.

The film was presented at the Kristiansand International Children's Film Festival on 20 April 2026 in Children's program.

The film was also part of Horizons section of the 60th Karlovy Vary International Film Festival, where it was screened from 5 July to 11 July 2026.

It was screened in the My First Fantasia section of the 30th Fantasia International Film Festival on August 1, 2026 for its Canadian premiere.

The film will be screened in Family Movie Weekend section at the Warsaw International Film Festival on 10 October 2026.

== Accolades ==
Award	Date of ceremony	Category	Recipient(s)	Result	Ref.
Berlin International Film Festival	22 February 2026	Crystal Bear for the Best Film in Generation Kplus	Papaya	Nominated	
