= Tasmanian Devils (film) =

2013 Canadian television film

- Promo poster
- Written by: Brook Durham
- Directed by: Zach Lipovsky
- Starring: Danica McKellar, Kenneth Mitchell, Mike Dopud, Apolo Ohno, Rekha Sharma
- Theme music composer: Jeff Tymoschuk
- Country of origin: Canada
- Original language: English

Production
- Cinematography: Norm Li
- Editor: Garry M.B. Smith
- Production companies: Original Pictures BC, Vesuvius Productions

Original release
- Network: Syfy
- Release: January 19, 2013

Tasmanian Devils is a 2013 television film directed by Zach Lipovsky and starring Danica McKellar and Apolo Ohno. The film was first released onto the Syfy channel on January 19, 2013 and revolves around a group of friends who get attacked by extremely large tasmanian devils. Radio Times rated the film poorly, giving it two out of 5 stars.

== Plot ==
When a group of thrill-seeking young adults BASE jump into a forbidden portion of the Tasmanian wilderness, they didn't foresee that one of their group would die in the process. They also didn't expect for their friend's blood to awaken ancient and gigantic Tasmanian devils that would swiftly seek to make them their supper. The group finds some assistance in two park rangers that arrive to arrest the group for trespassing, only to find that they too are in danger of becoming the deadly beasts' prey. One by one people start to die. Whitford is killed by one of the monsters. Then Danz dies next. The rest of the group tries to plan out an idea. In the last part of the movie, Alex reveals that her younger brother died falling from a high tree and that's why she is afraid of heights. In the end, Jayne and Alex share a kiss and survive.

== Cast ==
- Danica McKellar as Alex
- Kenneth Mitchell as Jayne
- Mike Dopud as Anderson
- Roger Cross as Simon
- Terry Chen as Walsh
- Rekha Sharma as Lisbon
- Apolo Ohno as Stone
- Joseph Sutherland as Danz
- Scott McNeil as Whitfield
- Julia Sarah Stone as Kid

== Production ==
SyFy officially announced plans to film Tasmanian Devils on October 18, 2011, and a week later confirmed that Danica McKellar would be cast as the movie's lead character. Lipovsky was brought on as the film's director, which would later prompt WWE Studios to hire him to direct Leprechaun: Origins based on his work with Tasmanian Devils. Filming took place in Canada over an 18-month period. Gizmodo questioned the film's casting of Tasmanian devils as a film villain, as they noted that it was an endangered animal due to Devil facial tumour disease. A conservationist for the Save the Tasmanian Devil Appeal later commented on the film, stating that she felt that few people would take the film seriously and that "if it raises the awareness of the devil overseas, and prompts people to find out more, then it is a good thing."
