= Romin =

2026 Canadian adventure film

- Directed by: Anthony Dionne; Jassen Charron
- Written by: Anthony Dionne; Sid Donarski
- Starring: Anthony Dionne; Jassen Charron; Rosalie Pépin; James Edward Metayer; Emmanuel Auger
- Cinematography: Thibault Duler
- Edited by: Geoff Klein; Anthony Dionne; Nikita El Mouderrib
- Music by: Brigitte Dajczer
- Production company: All Around Studios
- Distributed by: Filmoption International
- Release date: August 1, 2026 (Fantasia)
- Running time: 97 minutes
- Country: Canada
- Language: French

Romin is a Canadian adventure drama film, co-directed by Anthony Dionne and Jassen Charron and released in 2026.

The film stars Dionne as Romin, a teenager reeling from the recent death of his father, who discovers a mysterious artifact in the forest. After taking it home with him, however, he is struck with an ancient curse that means he will die in three days unless he can return the artifact to its rightful home, and must embark on a quest with his friend Jeff (Charron), his sister Maya (Rosalie Pépin) and his new classmate Booker (James Edward Metayer) to return the artifact while being pursued by Lincoln (Emmanuel Auger), who wants to steal the artifact for his own nefarious purposes.

The cast also includes Sid Donarski, Ève Salvail, Sonia Vachon, Paul Doucet, Derek Johns, Hubert Gélinas, Simon Pigeon, Ève Durenceau, Liliane Skelly, Carmen Silvestre and Sylvain Larocque in supporting roles.

== Production ==
The film was shot in the Bahamas.

== Distribution ==
The film premiered at the 30th Fantasia International Film Festival, where it won the Silver Audience Award for Quebec films.

It is slated to receive special advance screenings in Quebec City, Trois-Rivières, Sherbrooke and Saint-Eustache in late August, prior to its official commercial release on August 28.
