= Tight Lettuce =

2026 Canadian film

- French: Tissé serré
- Directed by: Harrison Houde
- Written by: Dakota Daulby; Harrison Houde; Rayden Wickop
- Produced by: Serge Desrosiers
- Starring: Dakota Daulby; Emmanuel Bilodeau
- Cinematography: Serge Desrosiers
- Edited by: Harrison Houde; Étienne Plasse
- Music by: Pierre-Philippe Côté
- Production companies: Vital Productions; Vesperia Films
- Distributed by: Vital Distribution
- Release date: July 18, 2026 (Fantasia)
- Running time: 95 minutes
- Country: Canada
- Languages: English; French

Tight Lettuce (French: Tissé serré) is a Canadian comedy-drama film, directed by Harrison Houde and released in 2026. The film stars Dakota Daulby as Joel, a young man who is desperately trying to save his father Bodo (Emmanuel Bilodeau) from heroin and fentanyl addiction.

The cast also includes Maxim Roy, Christie Burke, Peter Shinkoda, Josh Cruddas, France Castel, Rodrigo Fernandez-Stoll, Émile Schneider, Jennifer Khoe, Guy Jodoin, Didier Lucien and Jan Sikora in supporting roles.

== Distribution ==
The film premiered at the 30th Fantasia International Film Festival in July 2026.

== Awards ==
At Fantasia, it won the Gold Audience Award for Quebec films.

The film was a nominee for the DGC Award for Best Direction in a Feature Film at the Directors Guild of Canada awards in 2026.
