= A Safe Distance =

2026 Canadian film

- Directed by: Gloria Mercer
- Written by: Aidan West
- Produced by: Gloria Mercer; Aidan West; Nic Altobelli
- Starring: Bethany Brown; Cody Kearsley; Tandia Mercedes; Chris McNally
- Cinematography: Devan Scott
- Edited by: Gloria Mercer
- Music by: Caleb Chan
- Production companies: See Horse Films; Area V5 Pictures
- Distributed by: Vortex Media; Drafthouse Films
- Release date: March 12, 2026 (SXSW)
- Running time: 85 minutes
- Country: Canada
- Language: English

A Safe Distance is a 2026 Canadian crime thriller film directed by Gloria Mercer. The film stars Bethany Brown as Alex, a woman who is abandoned in the forest by her boyfriend Joey (Chris McNally) after rejecting his marriage proposal; she then comes across the off-the-grid camp of Matt (Cody Kearsley) and Kianna (Tandia Mercedes), a couple hiding out from the law after committing bank robbery, and becomes drawn into the couple's relationship as a third partner.

The film, Mercer's full-length directorial debut, is an expansion of her 2021 short film of the same title, which starred Lissa Neptuno as Alex and Emma Soothill as Kianna. It was shot in British Columbia in 2024, and produced by Mercer and screenwriter Aidan West under their See Horse Films banner along with Nic Altobelli of Area V5 Pictures.

The film premiered at the 2026 South by Southwest Film & TV Festival. Its Canadian premiere took place at the 30th Fantasia International Film Festival in July 2026.

== Critical response ==
Brian Tallerico of RogerEbert.com favourably reviewed the film, comparing it to the work of Patricia Highsmith, particularly Deep Water and its 2022 film adaptation. He concluded that "some of the material about the 'freedom' of the criminal life is a bit overwritten (although that’s sometimes-intentional given Matt is a bit of a blowhard), and the final act has a few choices and a twist that didn’t land for me, but the bulk of 'A Safe Distance' works. Not only is Mercedes a magnetic performer, Mercer shoots her limited settings well, giving the film a lush, natural look. I think Patricia Highsmith would have dug it."

== Awards ==
At Fantasia, the film tied with Insectasy for the Bronze Audience Award for Canadian films.
