= Finding Stuff Out =

Canadian children's television series

- Created by: Edward Kay; Jonathan Finkelstein
- Written by: Edward Kay; David Acer; Jean-Louis Coté; Jennifer Daley; Lisa Hunter; Naomi Jardine; Penelope Laurence
- Directed by: Jean-Louis Coté; Jereme Watt; Harrison Houde
- Starring: Harrison Houde (seasons 1–3); Zoey Siewert (seasons 4–5)
- Composers: Harrison Houde (seasons 1–3); Zoey Siewert (seasons 4–5)
- Country of origin: Canada
- No. of seasons: 5
- No. of episodes: 67

Production
- Executive producer: Johnathan Finkelsien
- Producers: Edward Kay; Jean-Louis Coté
- Production company: Apartment 11 Productions

Original release
- Network: TVOntario
- Release: January 20, 2012 – September 21, 2018

Finding Stuff Out is a Canadian children's television series, which premiered on TVOntario's TVOKids programming block in 2012. Hosted by Harrison Houde for the first three seasons and Zoey Siewert in season 4 and 5, the program educates viewers on science topics. The series was created by Edward Kay and Jonathan Finkelstein.

It has since been syndicated to other children's programming channels, including Knowledge Network, Pop, Nat Geo Kids, and Ion Television/Qubo.

The series is a three-time Canadian Screen Award nominee for Children's or Youth Non-Fiction Program, at the 1st Canadian Screen Awards in 2013, the 2nd Canadian Screen Awards in 2014 and the 4th Canadian Screen Awards in 2016. It won the award in 2016. In 2013, the show was also a Canadian Screen Award nominee for Best Cross-Platform Children's Project for Digital Media for its online components.

== Format ==
The show's host, Harrison Houde would often get questions from random kids that he doesn't know what the answers are, so he attempts to figure out what the answer is (hence the show's name). Harrison's show is filmed in the attic of his house, as shown in the opening sequence.

Houde left the show at the end of Season 3, due to him being on another Canadian show on a different network. After his departure, Zoey Siewert took over his hosting duties in Season 4 and 5, while the show still kept the same format like so.

== Recurring segments ==
=== Major segments ===
==== The Short Answer Is... ====
A question from the topic of the episode would be asked and Harrison (1–3) or Zoey (4–5) would give out a short answer for the question.

==== Street Smarts/Ask A Friend ====
Harrison/Zoey goes to places and talks to kids about the answers to the episode/topic's question.

==== You're Gonna Make My Head Explode! ====
Harrison/Zoey would often get confused with the topic and makes his/her head confused too (hence the name of the segment) and would often get an expert in the studio to talk about the topic.

==== My Great Challenge ====
Harrison/Zoey would often think of an idea for a challenge focusing on the episode's topic and would have kids in the studio taking place for Harrison/Zoey's challenges.

==== The Flat Earth Corner ====
Harrison/Zoey would dress up like people from the century and talk about stuff focusing on the topic of the episode.

==== DO Try This at Home ====
Harrison/Zoey would think of something about the topic or question that random kids ask, so they can do that people can do at home.

==== The Experiment ====
Harrison/Zoey can do an experiment.

==== The Big Answer Is... ====
At the end of each episode, Harrison/Zoey would often play the drums while explaining the big answer to someone's question they got at the start of the show.

=== Minor segments ===
==== The Sydney Report ====
Harrison's neighbor and best friend Sydney Kuhnne would often go to minor places for one of the random kid questions. It was used only for Season 1.
