= Harrison Houde =

Canadian singer and actor

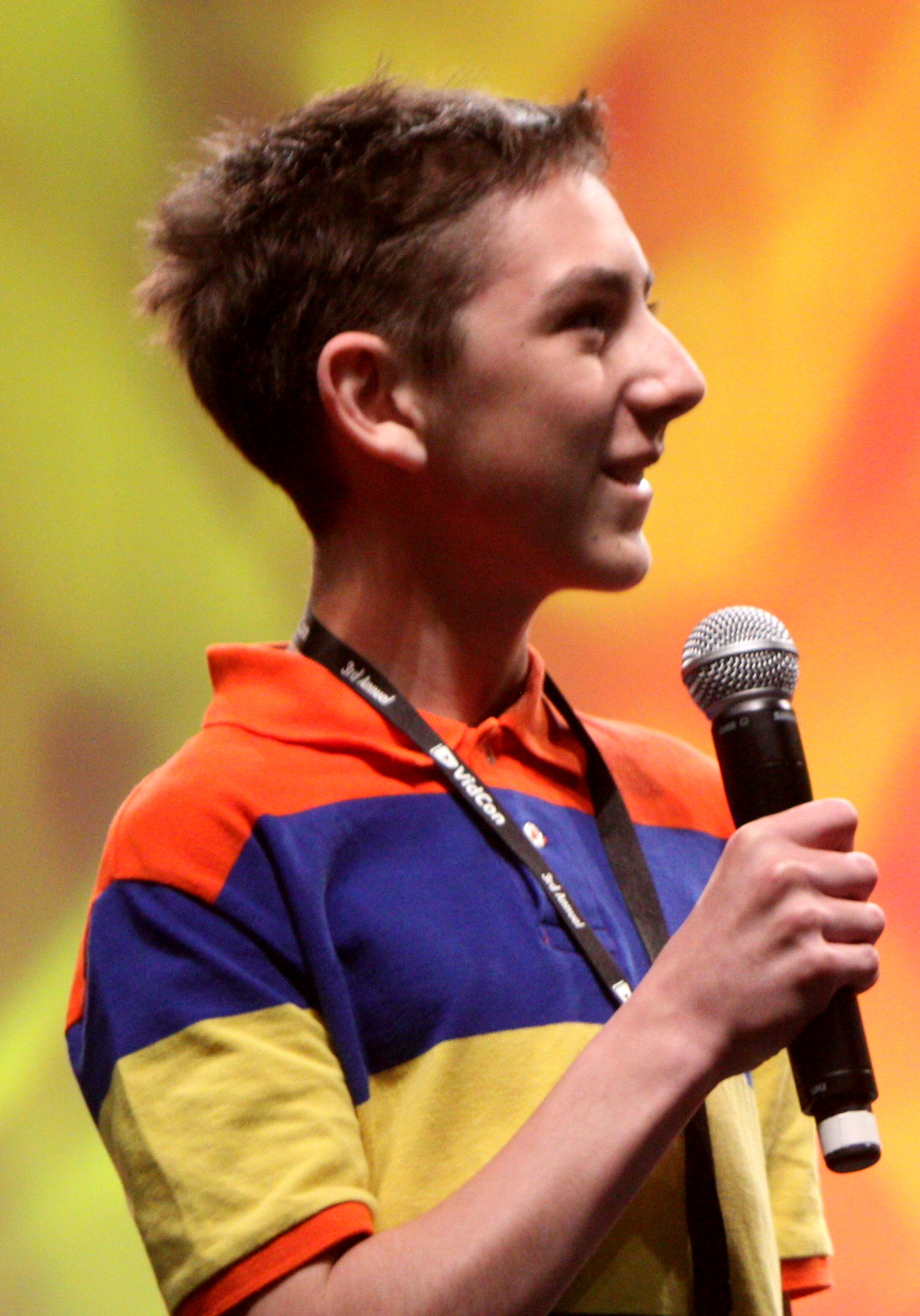
- Houde in 2012
- Born: March 26, 1996 (age 30); Vancouver Island, British Columbia, Canada
- Other name: Tokyo Rat
- Occupations: Actor, Producer, Director, Musician.
- Years active: 2008–present
- Website: http://www.HarrisonHoude.ca

Harrison Houde (/huːd/; born March 26, 1996) is a Canadian actor, producer, director, YouTuber, and musician. He is best known for his first acting role as Darren Walsh in the 2010 American film Diary of a Wimpy Kid and for his role as 'Bowie' in the sitcom Some Assembly Required. He has also composed original scores, which have aired on TV internationally, and is a synth-wave music producer under the alias Tokyo Rat.

== Career ==
=== Acting ===
He landed his first role in Diary of a Wimpy Kid in 2010.

He was nominated and won a Joey Award for his work in Some Assembly Required on November 16, 2014, in the category "Best Young Actor age 10-19 or younger in a TV Series Comedy/Action Leading Role." In 2015, Harrison was named one of Hollywood Reporter''s young up-and-coming rising stars to watch from Canada. The TV Show Finding Stuff Out, which Houde hosted, secured the Canadian Screen Award in 2016 for Best Children's or Youth Non-Fiction Program or Series.

=== Television ===
In early 2010, Houde began hosting the first three seasons of a television show called Finding Stuff Out, produced by Apartment 11 Productions.

On January 6, 2014, he joined the cast of the Canadian sitcom Some Assembly Required, which premiered on YTV and is on Netflix worldwide.

In 2017, Houde appeared in an episode of Rogue.

In 2021, Houde produced and directed a new show called Stories of Kindness, which was an interview series from “Canada’s ‘kindness champions’”. According to Houde, “the show focuses on spreading kindness, connection and storytelling through children”, and is hosted by Travis Price.

=== Filmmaking ===
Houde's first short film I Dare You made its debut at the 2016 Cannes Film Festival in Telefilm Canada's Not Short on Talent program.

Tight Lettuce, his feature directorial debut, entered production in 2024, and is slated to premiere at the 30th Fantasia International Film Festival.

=== YouTube ===
As of November 2022, he has 22.3K subscribers.

In early 2013 he signed with the YouTube network the Collective Digital Studios based in Beverly Hills, California.

In early 2016 Harrison left his YouTube network (Collective Digital Studios now known as Studio71).

== Filmography ==
=== Films ===
Year	Title	Character/Role	Notes
2010	Diary of a Wimpy Kid	Darren Walsh	
2011	A Fairly Odd Movie: Grow Up, Timmy Turner!	Hall Monitor	Television film
2014	Noah 2: Go Forth and Multiply	Japheth	Short film
2014	Pants on Fire	Kyle	TV movie
2016	I Dare You	Tyler	Short film
2017	The Samaritan	Max	Short film
2018	Summer of 84	Bobby Coker	
2018	Vinny's Girl	Hugo	Short film
2019	Buttonwillow	Cfred	Short film
2022	Girl Gone Bad	Blair	
2022	Cafe Racer	Harlow	
2026	Tight Lettuce		Director

=== Televisions ===
Year	Title	Character/Role	Notes
2010	Untold Stories of the E.R.	Alex	Episode: "Heart in Hand"
2012–2014	Finding Stuff Out	Harrison	Main role
2013–2014	Spooksville	Stanley 'Scaredy' Katzman	3 episodes
2014–2016	Some Assembly Required	Bowie Sherman	Main role
2016	The Bowie Showie	Bowie (as himself)	TV mini series
2017	Rogue	Bobby	Episode: "How The Light Gets In"
2018	IZombie	Caddy	Episode: "Blue Bloody"
2018	The Hollow	Kai	Episode: "Colrath"
2019	Bazerk!		Episode: "Love & Pizza"
