= Mum, I'm Alien Pregnant =

2026 New Zealand sci-fi comedy film

- Theatrical release poster
- Directed by: THUNDERLIPS (Sean Wallace and Jordan Mark Windsor)
- Written by: THUNDERLIPS (Sean Wallace and Jordan Mark Windsor)
- Produced by: Alix Whittaker; Morgan Leigh Stewart; Ilai Amar
- Starring: Hannah Lynch; Yvette Parsons; Arlo Green; Jackie van Beek
- Production companies: Hot Candle Wave; XYZ Films
- Distributed by: Umbrella Entertainment
- Release dates: January 23, 2026 (Sundance); September 10, 2026 (New Zealand)
- Running time: 95 minutes
- Country: New Zealand
- Language: English

Mum, I'm Alien Pregnant is a 2026 New Zealand sci-fi comedy film written and directed by New Zealand duo THUNDERLIPS (Sean Wallace and Jordan Mark Windsor) and produced by Alix Whittaker, Morgan Leigh Stewart, and Ilai Amar. The film stars Hannah Lynch, Yvette Parsons, Arlo Green, and Jackie van Beek. It had its world premiere in the Midnight section of the 2026 Sundance Film Festival.

== Plot ==
A messy millennial underachiever accidentally becomes alien-pregnant and must contend with skeptical doctors, a useless baby daddy, and her oversharing mother in order to survive and reclaim her life.

== Cast ==
- Hannah Lynch as Mary
- Yvette Parsons as Cynthia
- Arlo Green as Boo
- Jackie van Beek as Ann

== Production ==
Mum, I'm Alien Pregnant is the feature debut of THUNDERLIPS, and is based on their 2024 short film Help, I'm Alien Pregnant, which starred Hannah Lynch in the same role.

== Release ==
The film had its world premiere at the 2026 Sundance Film Festival in the Midnight section on 23 January 2026. The film was released in New Zealand on September 10, 2026.

== Reception ==
=== Critical reception ===
Writing for Mashable, Kristy Puchko gave the film a positive review, calling it "one of the strangest films I've seen in at least the last decade" and praising Hannah Lynch's performance as "incredible in every moment of righteous rage." Robert Daniels of RogerEbert.com offered a more mixed assessment, describing the film as "thin" but noting that "it survives on energy and humor, of which it has plenty." On review aggregator website Rotten Tomatoes, the film holds an approval rating of 94% based on 16 reviews, with an average rating of 6.5/10.

=== Accolades ===
Mum, I'm Alien Pregnant won an award at the 2026 New Zealand Screen Awards held on 19 November 2026: "Best Performance by a Supporting Actor in a Female Role - Feature" (Yvette Parsons).
