= Freaks Part II =

2026 science fiction horror film

- Directed by: Adam Stein; Zach Lipovsky
- Written by: Zach Lipovsky; Adam Stein
- Produced by: Zach Lipovsky; Adam Stein
- Starring: Amanda Crew; Lorelei Olivia Mote; Lili Taylor; Reznor Allen; Audrianna Lico; Stephen Tobolowsky
- Cinematography: Stirling Bancroft
- Edited by: Sabrina Pitre
- Music by: Tim Wynn
- Production companies: Elevation Pictures; Entract Films
- Distributed by: Paramount Pictures
- Release date: August 2, 2026 (Fantasia)
- Running time: 114 minutes
- Country: Canada
- Language: English

Freaks Part II is a 2026 Canadian science fiction horror film written, produced, and directed by Zach Lipovsky and Adam Stein, and is a sequel to Freaks (2018). Starring Amanda Crew, Lorelei Olivia Mote, Lili Taylor, and Stephen Tobolowsky, it follows Mary (Crew) and her daughter Chloe (Mote) as they live on the road while hiding their powers and identities from the Abnormal Defence Force.

Freaks Part II had its world premiere at the 30th Fantasia International Film Festival on August 2, 2026, as the closing film and competed in Cheval Noir Competition.

== Premise ==
A few years after running away from a terrible incident, Mary and her daughter Chloe hide from a brutal Abnormal Defence Force, that kills people with powers. Mary wants revenge on the officer who killed her first child, while Chloe's growing abilities and desire for friendship lead them into new dangers and reveal buried truths about Mary's past.

== Cast ==
- Amanda Crew as Mary
- Lorelei Olivia Mote as Chloe
- Lili Taylor as Erica Lang
- Reznor Allen
- Audrianna Lico as Josie
- Stephen Tobolowsky

== Production ==
Filming took place in Vancouver from March 19, 2025, to April 25, 2025.

== Release ==
On July 20, 2026, Paramount Pictures acquired worldwide rights Freaks Part II, giving it a wider theatrical release.

Freaks Part II closed the 30th Fantasia International Film Festival on August 2, 2026. It was screened in the Septentrion Shadows section and competed in the Cheval Noir competition.

On October 3, 2026, it was presented in the Altered States section of the 2026 Vancouver International Film Festival. That same month, it was screened as the surprise film at the 59th Sitges Film Festival on October 17.

== Accolades ==
Freaks Part II was nominated for the Cheval Noir Trophy for Best Film at the 30th Fantasia International Film Festival.
