= Wiebke von Carolsfeld =

German film editor and film director

- Born: 1966 (age 59–60); Germany
- Occupations: Film director, writer, editor
- Years active: 1990s-present
- Notable work: Marion Bridge, The Saver

Wiebke von Carolsfeld (born 1966) is a German Canadian film director, writer and editor. Her debut feature film as a director, Marion Bridge, won the Toronto International Film Festival Award for Best Canadian First Feature Film at the 2002 Toronto International Film Festival.

== Background ==
Originally from Germany, von Carolsfeld moved to Canada. Despite having degrees in medieval history and literature from the University of Cologne, she was rejected when she applied to Ryerson University's film school for lacking the Ontario-specific thirteenth grade in her high school transcripts. Instead, she volunteered with the local cable community channel to gain experience, before taking a job as an assistant editor on David Cronenberg's M. Butterfly.

== Career ==
Her credits as an editor include Eisenstein, Shoemaker, The Five Senses, The Bay of Love and Sorrows, Wrecked, Fugitive Pieces, Angelique's Isle and An Audience of Chairs. As an editor, she was a shortlisted Genie Award nominee for Best Editing at the 22nd Genie Awards in 2002 for Eisenstein.

As a writer/director, she followed up with the 2013 film Stay and the 2015 film The Saver. At the 4th Canadian Screen Awards in 2016, she was nominated for Best Adapted Screenplay for The Saver.

In 2019 she published Claremont, her first novel. In 2020 the book was optioned for a film adaptation by Jeremy Podeswa.

Her film Someone's Daughter premiered at the 30th Fantasia International Film Festival in 2026.
