= The Saver =

- Film poster
- Directed by: Wiebke von Carolsfeld
- Written by: Wiebke von Carolsfeld
- Based on: The Saver by Edeet Ravel
- Produced by: Aisling Chin-Yee; John Christou
- Starring: Imajyn Cardinal; Pascale Bussières; Alexandre Landry; Brandon Oakes
- Cinematography: Stéphanie Weber Biron
- Edited by: Wiebke von Carolsfeld
- Music by: Ramachandra Borcar
- Distributed by: Prospector Films
- Release date: September 20, 2015 (AFF)
- Running time: 88 minutes
- Country: Canada
- Language: English

The Saver is a 2015 Canadian drama film, written and directed by Wiebke von Carolsfeld.

Based on a novel by Edeet Ravel, the film stars Imajyn Cardinal as Fern, a young girl who is determined to assert her independence after the death of her mother. Taking over her mother's work as a house cleaner, she finds a book on how to become a millionaire, and resolves to start saving her money.

The film's cast also includes Pascale Bussières, Alexandre Landry, Monia Chokri, Pascale Montpetit, Brandon Oakes, Paul Spence and Hamidou Savadogo.

Von Carolsfeld garnered a Canadian Screen Award nomination for Best Adapted Screenplay at the 4th Canadian Screen Awards in 2016.
