= Nosipho Dumisa =

South African writer and director

- Born: 1988 (age 37–38)
- Education: AFDA
- Occupations: Director, writer, producer
- Years active: 2014–present
- Notable work: Indemnity
- Television: Blood & Water

Nosipho Dumisa (born 1988) is a South African writer, director and producer. She co-founded the production company Gambit Films. She wrote and directed her first feature film, the crime thriller Nommer 37, first as a short in 2014 followed by a feature version in 2018. She created the Netflix series Blood & Water (2020). She previously worked as a producer on the Afrikaans soap opera Suidooster.

Her works have been premiered at South by Southwest and have won international awards. She has sat on the jury of the Neuchâtel International Fantastic Film Festival in Switzerland. Her works typically feature Cape Town, where she resides, as a setting.

== Early life ==
Dumisa is from Margate, KwaZulu-Natal. She is Zulu, but learned Afrikaans in school. Initially into acting, an administrative error that enrolled her in a filmmaking course instead of an acting one led her to discover her interest in what happens behind the camera. She graduated with a Bachelor of Arts in the Motion Picture Medium from AFDA in 2009.

== Filmography ==
=== Film ===
Year	Title	Director	Writer	Producer	Notes
2014	Nommer 37	Yes	Yes	No	Short
2018	Nommer 37	Yes	Yes	Yes	
2021	Indemnity	No	No	Yes	

=== Television ===
Year	Title	Director	Writer	Producer	Distributor
2015–2020	Suidooster	No	No	Yes	kykNET & kie
2020–present	Blood & Water	Yes	Yes	Yes	Netflix
