= Freaks (2018 film) =

2018 science fiction thriller film

- Directed by: Adam Stein; Zach Lipovsky
- Written by: Zach Lipovsky; Adam Stein
- Produced by: Adam Stein; Zach Lipovsky; Jordan Barber; Mitchell Waxman
- Starring: Emile Hirsch; Bruce Dern; Grace Park; Amanda Crew; Lexy Kolker
- Cinematography: Stirling Bancroft
- Edited by: Sabrina Pitre
- Music by: Tim Wynn
- Production companies: Amazing Incorporated; Wise Daughter Films; My Way Productions; Storyboard Capital Group
- Distributed by: Well Go USA Entertainment
- Release dates: September 8, 2018 (TIFF); September 13, 2019 (United States)
- Running time: 105 minutes
- Countries: United States; Canada
- Language: English
- Budget: CA$2,000
- Box office: $368,410

Freaks is a 2018 science fiction thriller film written, co-produced, and directed by Zach Lipovsky and Adam Stein, and starring Emile Hirsch, Bruce Dern, Grace Park, Amanda Crew and Lexy Kolker. The film follows a seven-year-old girl (Kolker) who leaves her home for the first time after being kept inside by her father (Hirsch).

The film premiered at the Toronto International Film Festival on September 8, 2018, and was released commercially in North America on September 13, 2019, by Well Go USA Entertainment. It received positive reviews, with praise for Kolker's performance.

A sequel, Freaks Part II, was released in 2026.

== Plot ==
Seven-year-old Chloe Lewis has spent her entire life confined to a decrepit house with her father Henry, who forbids her from leaving under the threat of being killed by "the bad men". Chloe longs to experience the world outside her home and wants a maternal figure, never having met her deceased mother Mary. Henry educates her on social behavior so she will one day be able to pose as a member of the neighboring Reed family. Chloe observes occurrences in the house such as Henry bleeding from his eyes, and visions of a woman in her closet. She learns about "abnormals", people with superhuman abilities who are hunted by the government's Abnormal Defense Force (ADF) and contained in a facility under Madoc Mountain.

Chloe manages to leave the house and discovers her own abnormal power of manipulating a person's mind at the prodding of an elderly ice cream truck driver, who reveals he is Chloe's maternal grandfather Alan. He believes his daughter Mary is still alive. Chloe realizes that the woman in her closet is Mary, who is being held captive at Madoc Mountain. Henry and Alan are also revealed as abnormals by their bleeding eyes. Henry has used his time-altering powers to cause only a few months to pass outside of the house during his seven years inside with Chloe. Upon discovering that Chloe has left the house and been in contact with Alan, Henry takes her to the Reeds with a large sum of money, only to be turned away when Chloe uses her abilities on the Reed matriarch Nancy. Nancy alerts the ADF but Chloe tricks the agents into killing Nancy.

Using her manipulation abilities, Chloe begins to help Mary escape from Madoc Mountain, but is hindered by the arrival of ADF Agent Cecilia Ray who reveals she knows the truth about their family, and a drone strike will be ordered if they kill her. Ray kills Alan and mortally wounds Henry before she is killed by Chloe. Henry delays the ADF agents for Chloe to ensure Mary's escape, then slows time and carries Chloe out of the house as it is destroyed by a Hellfire missile.

After Henry succumbs to his injuries, Mary arrives with her ability to fly and kills the remaining ADF agents. Mary promises to keep Chloe hidden, but Chloe refuses to continue hiding, saying no one can stop them living wherever they want. Mary agrees and flies away with Chloe.

== Cast ==
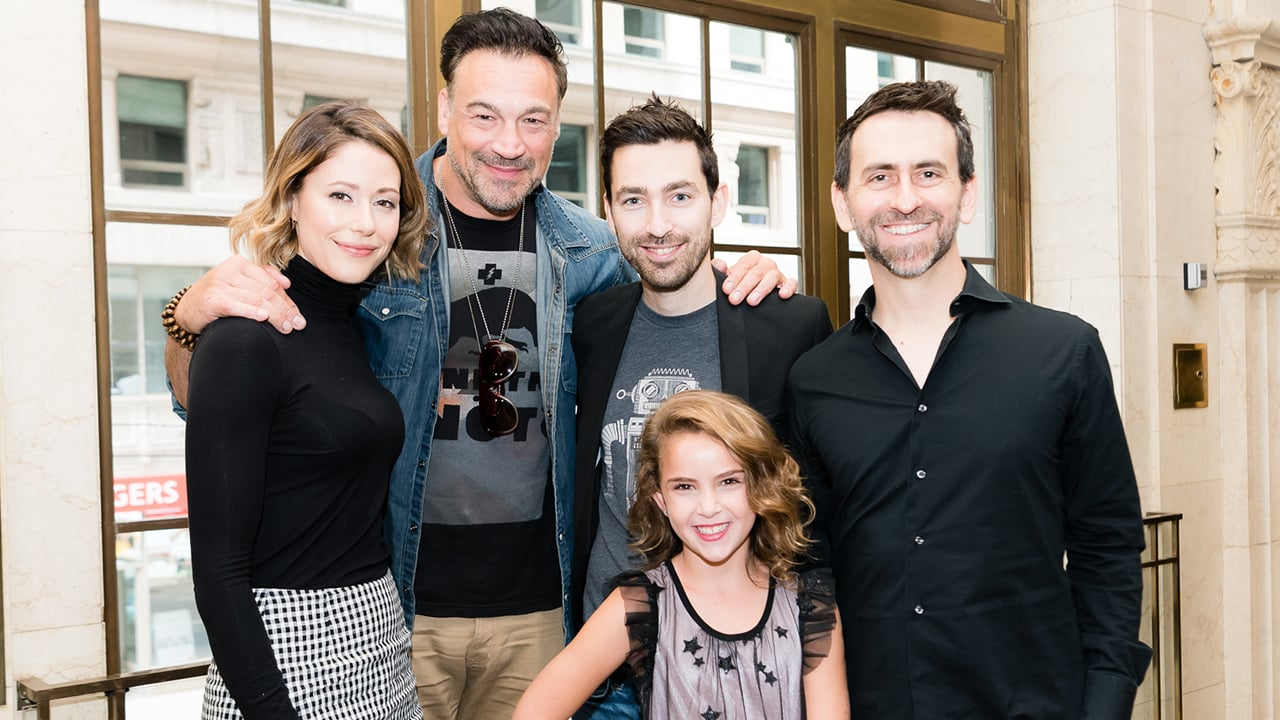
Freaks directors and cast in 2018. Left to right at rear: Amanda Crew, Aleks Paunovic, Zach Lipovsky, Adam Stein; front: Lexy Kolker.

- Emile Hirsch as Henry Lewis, Chloe's father, who can slow down time
- Bruce Dern as Alan / Mr. Snowcone, Chloe's maternal grandfather, who can turn invisible
- Grace Park as Cecilia Ray, a government agent with the Abnormal Defense Force (ADF)
- Amanda Crew as Mary Lewis, Chloe's mother, who possesses the ability to fly
- Lexy Kolker as Chloe Lewis, a seven-year-old telepath
- Ava Telek as Harper Reed, Nancy and Steven's daughter
- Michelle Harrison as Nancy Reed, Harper's mother and Steven's wife
- Matty Finochio as Steven Reed, Harper's father and Nancy's husband
- Aleks Paunovic as Robert Kraigen, a guard at Madoc Mountain

Additionally, R. J. Fetherstonhaugh portrays a police officer who encounters Chloe and Alan at a park. Dakota Daulby appears as the Madoc Mountain executioner and Dean Redman plays an ADF captain.

== Release ==
Freaks premiered at the Toronto International Film Festival on September 8, 2018. Two days later, Well Go USA Entertainment acquired distribution rights to the film.

After Toronto, the film screened at over 40 film festivals around the world, including the Sitges Film Festival in Spain, the Santa Barbara Film Festival, the Cinequest Film Festival, Cleveland Film Festival, and the Vancouver International Film Festival, where it was awarded the Emerging Director award. The Vancouver festival programmers wrote "Zach Lipovsky and Adam Stein's skewed sci-fi thriller ratchets up the go-for-broke audacity as it laces the family drama of Room with genre confections indebted to vintage Spielberg."

Freaks won the Asteroide Award, the top prize at the Trieste Science+Fiction Festival in Italy, and the Audience Award at Utopiales in France. It won Best Film and the Audience Award at the Paris International Fantastic Film Festival and won the Silver Raven Jury Prize at the Brussels International Fantastic Film Festival.

Freaks was released in theaters in the US and Canada on September 13, 2019. It was released for online sales and VOD on December 3, 2019, with a Blu-ray and DVD release on December 10, 2019.

== Reception ==
=== Box office ===
Freaks grossed $276,591 in the United States and Canada, and $73,531 in other territories, for a total worldwide gross of $350,112.

=== Critical response ===
Rotten Tomatoes reports an approval rating of 88% based on 85 reviews, with an average rating of 7.1/10. The website's critical consensus reads, "Stocked with solid performances, Freaks is a clever sci-fi/horror hybrid that suggests a bright future for co-writers/co-directors Zach Lipovsky and Adam Stein." On Metacritic, the film has a weighted average score of 63 out of 100 based on 16 critic reviews, indicating "generally favorable" reviews.

Germain Lussier of io9 called Freaks "a wonderful, exciting film, filled with complex, robust ideas that not only have a unique twist to them but a realistic grounding that makes them more relatable and impactful."

In The Hollywood Reporter, Justin Lowe praised the film's lead performances, stating that young Lexy Kolker's "semi-improvised performance couldn't be any more authentic and she's well matched with Hirsch, drawing on his own parental experience, as her conflicted and overprotective father. The ever-versatile Dern delivers a slyly subversive turn as Mr. Snowcone, whose hidden agenda involves much more than frozen treats."

Other reviewers praised Kolker as well. Collider's Perri Nemiroff called her performance "truly unforgettable work" and Variety's Andrew Barker said "relative newcomer Kolker carries the film effortlessly." In its summary of the Toronto Film Festival, TheWrap listed Kolker as a potential award contender.

In December 2018, the Toronto International Film Festival named the film to its annual year-end Canada's Top Ten list. After its online release in December 2019, Freaks topped the charts as the bestselling independent film on iTunes.

== Sequel ==
A sequel film, Freaks Part II, premiered as the closing film of the 30th Fantasia International Film Festival on August 2, 2026.
