= Adam Stein =

American film director

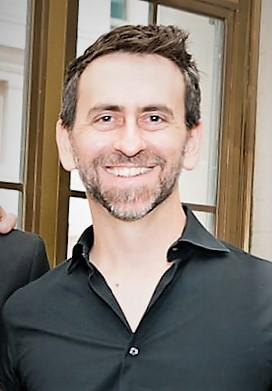
- Stein in 2018
- Born: 1977 (age 48–49); Miami, Florida, U.S.
- Occupations: Filmmaker; editor
- Years active: 2003–present

Adam B. Stein (born 1977) is an American filmmaker and film editor.

Stein graduated from Harvard University and the directing program at the USC School of Cinematic Arts. Prior to directing, Stein edited several independent features that played at film festivals such as Sundance, Tribeca, and SXSW.

== Career ==
=== On the Lot ===
Adam Stein was a contestant on On the Lot, the reality show produced by Steven Spielberg and Mark Burnett.

The films that Adam Stein created for On the Lot consistently received the highest reviews from the show's judges. Actress/writer Carrie Fisher said of his film Army Guy: "that was one of the most innovative, freaky, fantastic films I have seen." Director Gary Ross called Stein's filmmaking "charming, unbelievably ambitious, and really really technically proficient."

At least one celebrity judge chose Stein as their favorite filmmaker each time he made a film. New York Magazine called the director a "wunderkind". When Film Threat reviewed his film Dough: The Musical, the magazine said that it "covered a lot of visual ground and was extremely accomplished in lyrics, dancing, singing and acting."

=== Writing and directing ===
In 2022, it was revealed that Stein and filmmaking partner Zach Lipovsky would direct the next installment in New Line Cinema's Final Destination franchise. They got the job after a competitive search involving 200 potential directors and a pitching process that culminated in Stein faking his own death in the style of a Final Destination kill. Production on Final Destination Bloodlines took place in Vancouver in the Spring of 2024.

In 2018, Stein co-directed a live-action adaptation of the hit animated TV series Kim Possible. The movie aired February 15, 2019 on Disney Channel.

The independent feature film Freaks that Stein wrote and directed with partner Zach Lipovsky premiered at the Toronto Film Festival and has won awards at several film festivals around the world. The Vancouver Film Festival, which awarded Stein and Lipovsky "Best Emerging Director," said that their film "ratchets up the go-for-broke audacity as it laces the family drama of Room with genre confections indebted to vintage Spielberg." Freaks was released in theaters on September 13, 2019.

In 2016, Adam Stein directed episodes for the first and second seasons of the Disney XD series Mech-X4. He was also the director of the Disney Channel pilot "Forever Boys." Before that, he directed comedy pieces for Jimmy Kimmel Live! on ABC.

Stein has written and directed dozens of short films and music videos, which have been released around the world. He directed the music video "Suburban Symphony" for the Yo-Yo Ma Plays Ennio Morricone album. This music video was first screened at an orchestral performance conducted by Andrea Morricone, with Yo-Yo Ma playing live. The music video was then sold as part of the album's bonus DVD.

His USC film Hot Java played at many festivals around the country and won the top prize at the Gen Art Film Festival. His film script Tangles won an Alfred P. Sloan Foundation grant for screenwriting.

With film school collaborator Sam Friedlander and actor Mark Feuerstein, he made "Lazy Monday", an online parody described as a "west coast rap battle" response to Saturday Night Live's "Lazy Sunday". This video was widely played and widely copied, being featured on VH1, Bravo, and many other media outlets. After the release of this video, CNN's Paula Zahn interviewed Stein and Feuerstein about making content for the web.

In November 2025, it was announced that Stein would co-write Gremlins 3 with Chris Columbus (who will direct) and Zach Lipovsky with Steven Spielberg serving as an executive producer. The film is set for release on November 19, 2027.

In February 2026, it was announced that Stein and Lipovsky would direct an animated movie based on the Marvel Comics character Venom for Sony Pictures. In April that same year, it was announced Stein and Lipovsky had signed a first-look deal with Sony Pictures, and would direct an original sci-fi film entitled The Earthling and a film based on Metal Gear Solid in addition to the animated Venom film.

Freaks Part II, a sequel to Freaks, is slated to premiere in August 2026 as the closing film of the 30th Fantasia International Film Festival.

=== Editing ===
Stein has worked as an editor on several feature films, including:

- Blue State, starring Anna Paquin and Breckin Meyer
- Fifty Pills, starring Kristen Bell and Lou Taylor Pucci
- Flakes, starring Zooey Deschanel
- The documentary Who Killed the Electric Car?, which premiered at Sundance in 2006.

== Filmography ==
=== Co-directed with Zach Lipovsky ===
Feature film

Year	Title	Director	Writer	Producer
2018	Freaks	Yes	Yes	Yes
2025	Final Destination Bloodlines	Yes	No	No
2026	Freaks Part II	Yes	Yes	Yes

Short film

Year	Title	Notes
2012	Itsy Bitsy Spiders	
2016	Trunk	Also writer, editor, executive producer and visual effects artist

TV series

Year	Title	Director	Executive Producer	Writer	Notes
2014	Ingress Obsessed	Yes	Yes	Yes	All 13 episodes
2022	Fraggle Rock: Back to the Rock	Yes	No	No	Episodes "Into the Trash" and "All of Us"
2022	Ultra Violet & Black Scorpion	Yes	No	No	Episode "The Violet Behind the Ultra"

TV movie

- Kim Possible (2019) (Also co-producer)
