= Zach Lipovsky =

Canadian film director (born 1984)

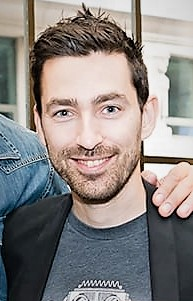
- Lipovsky in 2018
- Born: 7 February 1984 (age 42); Vancouver, British Columbia, Canada
- Occupations: Filmmaker, actor
- Years active: 2005–present

Zach Lipovsky (born 7 February 1984) is a Canadian filmmaker, former child actor, and visual effects specialist. His films include Final Destination Bloodlines (2025) together with Adam Stein.

== Career ==
Lipovsky was a finalist on the first season of the Fox reality show On the Lot, where he placed 5th out of 12,000 directors worldwide. He went on to direct the films Tasmanian Devils, Leprechaun: Origins, and Dead Rising: Watchtower.

In 2019, he directed and produced the DisneyXD series Mech-X4, for which he was nominated for a Daytime Emmy. Following that, he co-directed the live-action Disney film Kim Possible and wrote and directed the sci-fi thriller Freaks, both with writing and directing partner Adam Stein. In 2022, Lipovksy and Stein were announced as the directors for Final Destination Bloodlines.

In November 2025, it was announced that Lipovsky and Stein would co-write Gremlins 3 with Chris Columbus who will also serve as the director and producer with Steven Spielberg signed on as an executive producer. The film is set for release on November 19, 2027.

In February 2026, it was announced that Lipovsky and Stein would direct an animated movie based on the Marvel Comics character Venom for Sony Pictures. In April that same year, it was announced Lipovsky and Stein had signed a first-look deal with Sony Pictures, and would direct an original sci-fi film entitled The Earthling and a film based on Metal Gear Solid in addition to the animated Venom film.

Freaks Part II, a sequel to Freaks, is slated to premiere in August 2026 as the closing film of the 30th Fantasia International Film Festival.

== Personal life ==
Lipovsky is Jewish.

== Filmography ==
=== Co-directed with Adam Stein ===
Feature film

Year	Title	Director	Writer	Producer
2018	Freaks	Yes	Yes	Yes
2025	Final Destination Bloodlines	Yes	No	No
2026	Freaks Part II	Yes	Yes	Yes

Short film

Year	Title	Notes
2012	Itsy Bitsy Spiders	
2016	Trunk	Also writer, editor, executive producer and visual effects artist

TV series

Year	Title	Director	Executive Producer	Writer	Notes
2014	Ingress Obsessed	Yes	Yes	Yes	All 13 episodes
2022	Fraggle Rock: Back to the Rock	Yes	No	No	Episodes "Into the Trash" and "All of Us"
2022	Ultra Violet & Black Scorpion	Yes	No	No	Episode "The Violet Behind the Ultra"

TV movie

- Kim Possible (2019) (Also co-producer)

=== Solo works ===
Short film

Year	Title	Director	Writer	Notes
2005	Crazy Late	Yes	Yes	Also post-production supervisor and visual effects

On the Lot shorts

Year	Title	Director	Writer	Editor	Notes
2007	Danger Zone	Yes	Yes	Yes	
2007	Sunshine Girl	Yes	Yes	Yes	Also production designer and visual effects
2007	Die Hardly Working	Yes	Yes	No	
2007	Time Upon a Once	Yes	Yes	No	

TV movie

- Tasmanian Devils (2013)

Feature film

Year	Title	Director	Producer	Notes
2013	Afflicted	No	Yes	
2014	Leprechaun: Origins	Yes	No	
2015	Dead Rising: Watchtower	Yes	Associate	Also visual effects artist

Television

Year	Title	Director	Executive Producer	Notes
2016-2018	Mech-X4	Yes	Yes	13 episodes

=== Acting roles ===
TV series

Year	Title	Role	Notes
1996	Goosebumps	Freddy Renfield	Episode "Vampire Breath"
1998	Nilus the Sandman	Narrator	13 episodes
1998-2001	You, Me and the Kids	Tyler / Bully	5 episodes
1999	So Weird	Dan	Episode "Escape
2000	The Adventures of Shirley Holmes	Anton	Episodes "The Case of the Calculated Crime" and "The Case of the Virtual Zeus"

TV movies

Year	Title	Role
1996	The Angel of Pennsylvania Avenue	Henry
1998	Big and Hairy	Owen 'O' O'Malley
1999	Zenon: Girl of the 21st Century	Matt
1999	Hayley Wagner, Star	Debate Club Guy

Feature film

Year	Title	Role
2000	Mr. Rice's Secret	Funnel 'Funnel Head' McConnell

== See also ==
- List of On the Lot films
