= Neverman =

2026 Canadian drama film

- Directed by: Rodrigo Barriuso
- Written by: Kyah Green; Rodrigo Barriuso
- Produced by: Aeschylus Poulos; Sonya Di Rienzo
- Starring: Justin Vivian Bond; Marie-Josée Croze; Zaiba Baig; Elias Koteas
- Cinematography: Rodrigo Michelangeli
- Edited by: Michelle Szemberg
- Music by: Todor Kobakov; Felipe Téllez
- Production company: Hawkeye Pictures
- Distributed by: Sphere Media
- Release date: September 14, 2026 (TIFF)
- Running time: 98 minutes
- Country: Canada
- Language: English

Neverman is a Canadian drama film, directed by Rodrigo Barriuso and released in 2026. The film stars Justin Vivian Bond as Lucia, a transgender woman who moves into a nursing home after being diagnosed with early-onset Alzheimer's disease, only to have to renew her fight for acceptance and dignity in her new environment.

The cast also includes Marie-Josée Croze, Zaiba Baig, Elias Koteas, Jess Salgueiro, Eva Everett Irving, Laura Wilson, Daniel Karp, Duane Murray, Taylor Love, Scott Baker, Siena Cutone, Jason Reilly and Jordan D'Amico in supporting roles.

== Distribution ==
The film premiered in the Centrepiece program at the 2026 Toronto International Film Festival. The film was also screened at the Windsor International Film Festival, in competition for the $25,000 WIFF Prize in Canadian Film.

== Critical response ==
Pat Mullen of That Shelf wrote that "Neverman laudably keeps Lucia’s identity to the post-transition years, too. While Rose gives the care home’s administrators some literature about working with trans patients, the film, written by Barriuso and Kyah Green, doesn’t treat gender as something to play with. It firmly respects Lucia’s plight and her hold on her identity. In doing so, Neverman offers a tribute to the elders who worked so hard for the freedom that people of our generation enjoy today."
