= Sonya Di Rienzo =

Canadian film producer

Sonya Di Rienzo is a Canadian film producer. She is most noted as a producer of the films My Tree, which was a Canadian Screen Award nominee for Best Feature Length Documentary at the 10th Canadian Screen Awards in 2022, and Brother, which won the CSA for Best Motion Picture at the 11th Canadian Screen Awards in 2023.

She is a partner with Aeschylus Poulos in Hawkeye Pictures.

== Filmography ==
- How Are You? - 2008, producer
- Dinner at Lucy's - 2009, producer
- Fat Chance - 2009, producer
- The Translator - 2010, producer and director
- Big Moments in Little Films - 2010, producer
- The Day I Thought I Died - 2010, producer
- Happy Pills - 2010, producer
- The Devil's Delight - 2010, producer
- Little Films About Big Moments - 2010, producer and director
- Mulroney: The Opera - 2011, associate producer
- Behind the Curtain: The Making of Mulroney the Opera - 2011, director
- Little Mao - 2012, producer
- His Turn - 2013, producer
- Gaysian - 2013, producer
- Hellions - 2015, associate producer
- Static - 2016, producer
- The Bone Stocks - 2016, producer
- Tuesday, 10:08a.m. - 2017, executive producer
- Propaganda: The Art of Selling Lies - 2019, producer
- Queen of the Morning Calm - 2019, executive producer
- My Tree - 2021, producer
- Brother - 2022, producer
- The Young Arsonists - 2022, producer
- The Long Rider - 2022, executive producer
- Mr. Dressup: The Magic of Make-Believe - 2023, executive producer
- Queen Tut - 2023, executive producer
- The Graceless Age: The Ballad of John Murry - 2023, executive producer
- Paying for It - 2024, producer
- Who Owns the World - 2024, executive producer
- The Players - 2025, producer
- Gimme Truth - 2026, executive producer
- The Banquet - 2026, producer
- Neverman - 2026, producer
