= Jack Cutmore-Scott =

English actor

Jack Cutmore Scott
- Born: 16 April 1987 (age 39); London, England
- Education: Harvard University
- Occupation: Actor
- Years active: 2010–present
- Spouse: Meaghan Rath (m. 2020)
- Children: 2

Jack Cutmore Scott (born 16 April 1987) is an English actor. He is known for his role as Frederick "Freddy" Crane in the Paramount+ series Frasier.

== Early life and education ==
Born in London to two accountants, he spent a gap year at the London Academy of Music and Dramatic Art, and was involved in the Edinburgh Fringe Festival.

He was educated at Harvard University, where he studied English literature, languages, and theatre. He started his acting career at the age of 20.

== Career ==
Cutmore Scott played the role of Rufus Saville in the 2014 film Kingsman: The Secret Service. In 2016, he played the title character in the television series Cooper Barrett's Guide to Surviving Life.

In 2018, Cutmore Scott played disgraced illusionist/magician-turned-FBI consultant Cameron Black following an illusion that goes horribly wrong in the new ABC murder-mystery series Deception. He also portrayed Cameron's incarcerated, identical twin brother Jonathan. To prepare for these roles, he worked with magicians David Kwong and Francis Menotti to learn how to perform the magic tricks on the show.

From 2023 to 2024, Cutmore Scott played Frederick "Freddy" Crane, the son of the title character in the Paramount+ revival of the sitcom Frasier.

== Filmography ==
=== Film ===
Year	Title	Role	Notes
2014	Kingsman: The Secret Service	Rufus Saville	
2017	Dunkirk	Lifeboat Soldier 1	
2017	Bad Match	Harris Kroller	
2020	Tenet	Klaus	
2023	Oppenheimer	Lyall Johnson	

=== Television ===
Year	Title	Role	Notes
2014	Cabot College	Charlie Deckard	Unsold TV Pilot
2015	The Go-Between	Denys Maudsley	TV movie
2016	Cooper Barrett's Guide to Surviving Life	Cooper Barrett	Main cast (13 episodes)
2018	Deception	Cameron & Jonathan Black	Main cast (13 episodes)
2018	Magnum P.I.	Neil Crawford	Episode: "The Woman Who Never Died"
2019	What If?	Jack	Lead role (unaired pilot); also creator and writer
2020	Jury Duty	John "Hutty" Huttman	Lead role (pilot)
2020	Hawaii Five-0	Gabe Darsyk	Episode: "He kohu puahiohio i ka ho'olele i ka lepo i luna"
2023–2024	Frasier	Frederick "Freddy" Crane	Main role (20 episodes)
2024	Death and Other Details	Tripp Collier	Recurring role (10 episodes)
2025	Law and Order	Sean Harper	Episode: "The Hardest Thing"
2026	Best Medicine	Parker	Season 2
