= Bordeira (Santa Bárbara de Nexe) =

- Lugar/Locality
- Location of the community of Bordeira
- Coordinates: 37°7′17.43″N 7°55′25.40″W
- Country: Portugal
- Region: Algarve
- Subregion: Algarve
- District: Faro
- Municipality: Faro
- Civil Parish: Santa Bárbara de Nexe
- Elevation: 200 m (660 ft)
- Time zone: UTC0 (WET)
  - Summer (DST): UTC+1 (WEST)
- Postal Zone: (+351) XXX XXX XXX
- ISO 3166 code: PT

Bordeira is a locality in the civil parish of Santa Bárbara de Nexe, in the municipality of Faro. It is strongly associated with its rich history in stone, as well as its traditional New Year's songs/chants (the charoles) and history as the centre of the accordion musicians in Portugal.

== History ==
A human presence in the parish remotes to the transition between the middle and late Paleolithic epoch (some 30000 years ago). But, the first references to the community of Bordeira occurred between 1567 and 1568: in 1567, Vasco Martins, an inhabitant from Bordeira bought a bull to help cultivate his land, from João Nobre (an inhabitant from Corotelo); and, in 1568, João Vasques Formoso, another dweller in the region moved his stakes to Gorjões.

In the 17th and 18th century, there were other names referred to as Bordeira in the territory: Parreiras de Bordeira and Poço de Bordeira, and later Barranco de Bordeira and Bordeira de Além in the 19th century.

In 1742, a contract between the Third Order of Our Lady of Mount Carmel and master mason Diogo Tavares was signed. In it, Tavares would supply limestone from Borderira for paving stone in the Church of Carmo in Faro. This documented the long and intimate relationship between the territory of Bordeira and the civil parish of Santa Bárbara de Nexe, known for the extraction and transformation of stone, used for architectural projects in the parish. By 1839, Borderira and Goldra were the two communities in the parish with the most number of homes: 74 dwellings in both (with 70 in Gorjões and Santa Bárbara de Nexe, each).

In the 20th century, the charolas were a force binding the community and social identity of Santa Bárabara das Nexes, especially in Bordeira. Around 1918, the charola Mocidade União (Youth Union), was founded to provide an organized forum for the traditional New Year's event, and allowed them to express and affirm the local collective identity. This included festivals, improvisations, the liveliness of the music, the evocation of tradition, friendship, unity and fraternity. This was followed in 1919 by the creation of the União Bordeirense.

In 1921, the Cooperativa de Consumo A Bordeirense (Bordeirense Consumeer Cooperative) was created to produce and promote local products (one of the oldest of this type in Portugal).

The Sociedade do Carro Funerário (Funerary Car Society) was established in 1923, to transport the dead to the cemetery of Santa Bárbara de Nexe (eventually closing in 1960).

The 20th century was a period of growth and development, with many institutions and organizations developing at the time. In 1926 the Sindicato dos Cortadores e Limpadores de Árvores de Bordeira (Union of Bordeira Tree Cutters and Cleaners) was created just before the sequence of events that would result in the imposition of the military coupe, while the Cooperativa do Lagar de Azeite (Olive Oil Cooperative), which functioned until the 1970s, was founded in 1940. On 28 March 1936 the Sociedade Recreativa Bordeirense (Bordeirense Recreative Society) was created to promote the local culture and active life.

At the time of its second census (1940), Bordeira was one of the more populous sites in the civil parish, with 875 inhabitants (comprising 17% of the parish's population), followed by Gorjões (701 residents) and Goldra (570 residents).

The primary school in the place was installed in 1953, inaugurated in May, on lands offered by José de Sousa Gago, then the first school in the parish. To complement these local activities, a Health Centre was installed in 1988.

== Culture ==
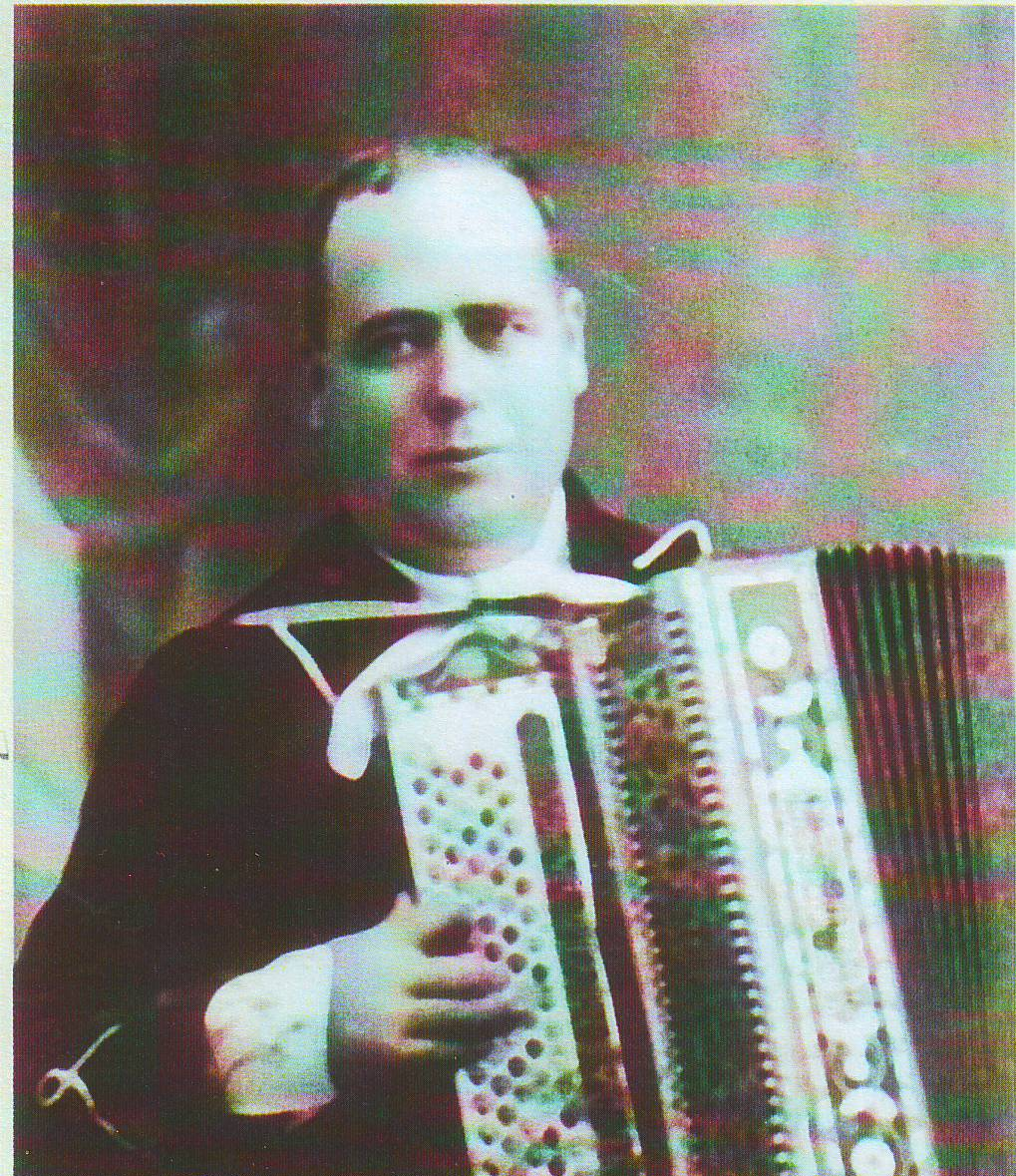
José Ferreiro Sr.

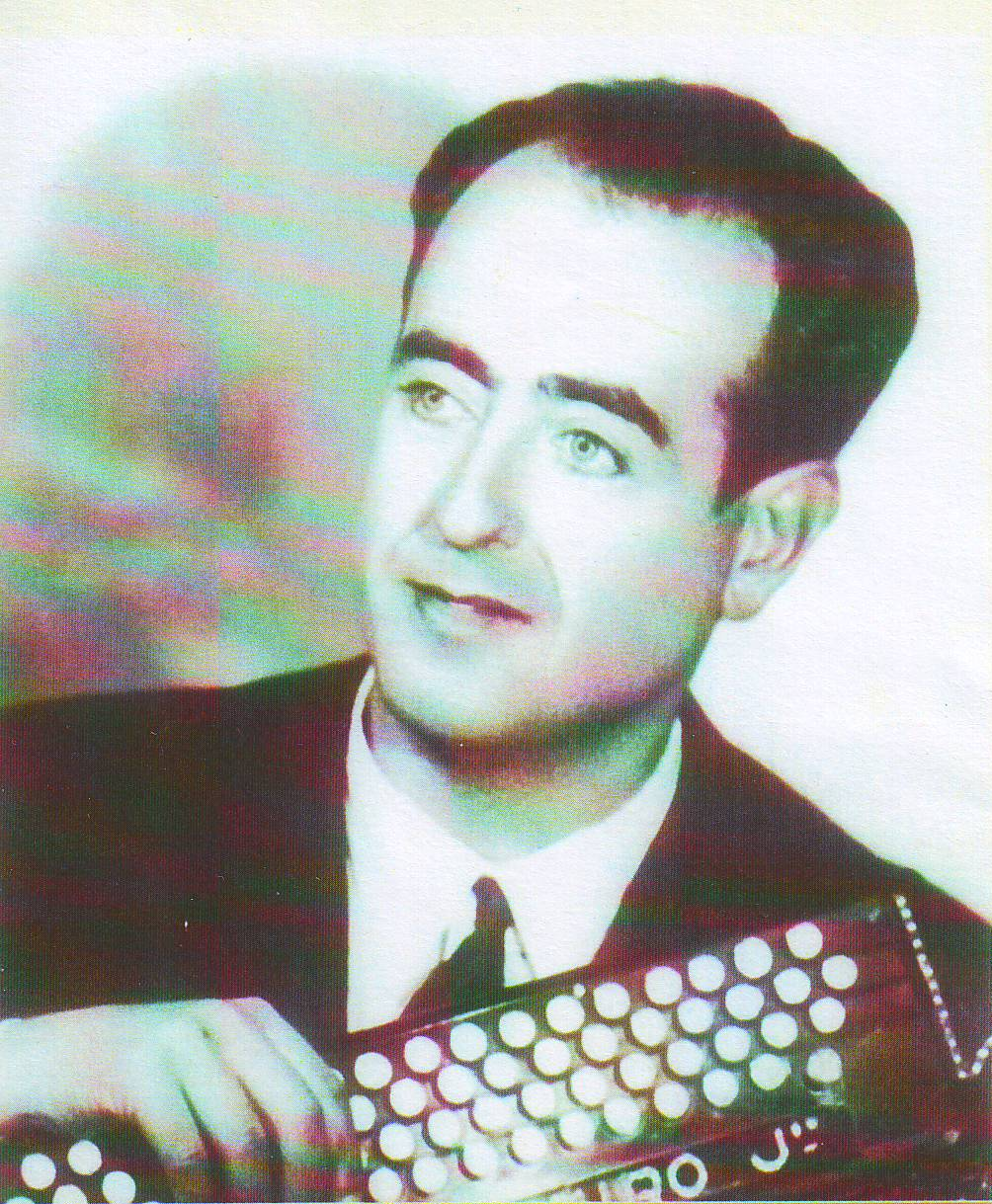
José Ferreiro Júnior (1943)

It is sometimes recognized as the capital of the accordion for the many composers and musicians who created music for this instrument. Among the maestros, José Ferreiro (author of Alma Algarvia), and João Barra Bexiga, in addition to many musicians born in or around Bordeira (including João Bexiga, Daniel Rato, Jorge Ferreira, nephew of José Ferreiro, António Madeirinha, who lived in an area called Alface. For some time other musicians lived in the area, attracted by the influences of this community, including Eugénia Lima, influenced by José Ferreiro and son.

Along Rua José Ferreiro Pai, Nelson Conceição operated an accordion school, eventually winning the Italia Award, for his contribution to Portuguese music.

== Notable citizens ==
- José da Neves Vargues (20 May 1895 - 21 August 1967), also known as José Ferreiro, accordionist and composer, known as the author of the Algarve's hymn Alma Algarvia;
- José Vargues Prazeres (28 February 1915 - 1964, Brazil), not known as José Ferreiro Júnior, who along with his father José Ferreiro, were part of the two Orquestras Típicas de Acordeão (typical Accordion Orchestras), along with accordionists António Madeirinha, José Guerreiro Marum, Goçalves Cochaco ad others, like maestros Frederico Valério and João Nobre;
- João Barra Bexiga (9 October 1924), accordionist, romantic and philosopher
- Nelson Conceição (12 June 2011), accordionist and Portuguese recipient of the Italia Award, for best modern composition (awarded annually in the Italian city of Pineto).

== See also ==
- Santa Bárbara de Nexe
