= Frasier (2023 TV series) =

American television sitcom (2023–2024)

- The title card depicts the Boston skyline, including the Custom House Tower, the Federal Reserve Bank of Boston, the Prudential Tower, 111 Huntington Avenue and the Zakim Bridge
- Genre: Sitcom
- Based on: Frasier by; David Angell; Peter Casey; David Lee; Frasier Crane by Glen Charles & Les Charles
- Developed by: Chris Harris & Joe Cristalli
- Starring: Kelsey Grammer; Jack Cutmore-Scott; Toks Olagundoye; Jess Salgueiro; Anders Keith; Nicholas Lyndhurst
- Ending theme: "Tossed Salads and Scrambled Eggs" by Kelsey Grammer
- Country of origin: United States
- Original language: English
- No. of seasons: 2
- No. of episodes: 20

Production
- Executive producers: Kelsey Grammer; Chris Harris; Joe Cristalli; Tom Russo; Jordan McMahon; Suzy Mamann-Greenberg
- Editor: Russell Griffin
- Camera setup: Multi-camera
- Running time: 24–31 minutes
- Production companies: Shiny Brass Lamp Productions; Floral & Flannel Inc.; Grammnet Productions; CBS Studios

Original release
- Network: Paramount+
- Release: October 12, 2023 – November 14, 2024

Related
- Cheers (1982–1993); Frasier (1993–2004)

Frasier (/ˈfreɪʒər/) is an American television sitcom that premiered on October 12, 2023, on Paramount+. Developed by Chris Harris and Joe Cristalli, it is a sequel to the 1993–2004 sitcom of the same name (a spin-off sequel to the sitcom Cheers) featuring the character Frasier Crane, played by Kelsey Grammer. On February 22, 2024, the series was renewed for a second season, with production beginning on May 9. The second season was released on September 19, 2024.

On January 17, 2025, Frasier was canceled by Paramount+. At the same time, CBS Studios announced that it had planned to shop the show to other outlets, such as Prime Video or Hulu. However, no other service announced interest in a third season.

== Premise ==
Shortly after the death of his father, Martin Crane, the end of his nearly 20-year relationship with Charlotte, and concluding his famous Chicago TV show, psychiatrist Frasier Crane has returned to Boston in the hope of having a better relationship with his son, Frederick, now a Boston firefighter. In order to do so, Frasier becomes a lecturer at Harvard University, buys and moves into Freddy's apartment building, and with the help of his family, friends, and his new colleagues, starts to embark on his "third act".

== Cast ==
=== Main ===
- Kelsey Grammer as Frasier Crane, who moves back to Boston to reconnect with his son. Following the last episode of the previous series, Frasier is now very wealthy following a long and successful stint as a radio talk show host in Seattle and a TV talk show host in Chicago. He is just recently single. He is also a retired psychiatrist, published author, and gains employment as a lecturer of psychology at Harvard.
- Jack Cutmore-Scott as Frederick "Freddy" Crane, Frasier's and Lilith's son. Now in his mid-30s, and a Boston firefighter, he briefly went to Harvard, but chose to drop out, which strained his relationship with Frasier. A nuanced combination of his father and grandfather, with his mother's sense of humor, he only becomes more of an intellectual when he drinks and his accent wears off. It is also discovered he can speak French, and do magic. The character was played by Trevor Einhorn in the original series.
- Toks Olagundoye as Professor Olivia Finch, the chair of Harvard University's psychology department. In the first episode, she was desperate to have Frasier join the Harvard faculty due to the attention his fame would bring. Although initially infatuated with Freddy, she develops more variety in her relationships as the series progresses.
- Jess Salgueiro as Eve, Freddy's neighbor and former roommate, a single mother and the girlfriend of one of Freddy's fellow firefighters who died in the line of duty.
- Anders Keith as David Crane, Frasier's nephew and Freddy's cousin who was born in the Frasier series finale and is the son of Niles Crane and Daphne Moon. He is a college freshman attending Harvard University, where he studies psychology. Awkward, yet confident, with a tendency for off-kilter observations, he has his father's intelligence and his mother's heart yet neither of their polish.
- Nicholas Lyndhurst as Professor Alan Cornwall, Frasier's friend from the University of Oxford who is now a Harvard psychology professor. British, boozy, mischievous, and intellectually on-par with Frasier, he has a cavalier attitude towards his work and does not appear to have any affection for his students. He has four children, from all of whom he is estranged.

=== Recurring ===
- Jimmy Dunn as Bernard "Moose" (seasons 1–2), one of Freddy's firefighter buddies and co-worker
- Renee Pezzotta as Smokey (seasons 1–2), one of Freddy's firefighter buddies and co-worker
- Kevin Daniels as Tiny (seasons 1–2), one of Freddy's firefighter buddies and co-worker
- Peri Gilpin as Roz Doyle (seasons 1–2), Frasier's close friend and former co-worker
- Patricia Heaton as Holly Quagliano (season 2), a down–to–earth, unpretentious Boston native. She tends bar at upscale restaurants and events.

=== Guest ===
- June Diane Raphael as June Patrick (season 1); a single friend of Eve's who has been set up on a blind date with Freddy, but takes a liking to Frasier
- Jacqueline Obradors as Siobhan (season 1); a single friend of Eve's and a former opera singer who is intended to be Frasier's blind date
- Bebe Neuwirth as Lilith Sternin (season 1); Frasier's ex-wife and Freddy's mother
- Vince Wilfork as himself (season 1)
- Amy Sedaris as Dr. Virginia Susan "Doc/Ginny Sue" Stathos (season 2); a municipal therapist with a down home, scattered veneer. She works with the firefighters at Freddy's firehouse and is also a big fan of Frasier Crane from his old TV talk show.
- Yvette Nicole Brown as Dr. Monica Finch (season 2); part haughty professor and part Nancy Drew, she is Olivia Finch's biting and delightfully deadpan sister, who has everything Olivia has and everything Olivia wants and never misses a chance to remind her.
- Greer Grammer as Alice Doyle (season 2); Roz Doyle's daughter, born in the fifth season of the show's original run. Now in her late 20s, friendly, and outgoing, she is studying architecture at Rhode Island School of Design (RISD) in Providence. In the original series she was played by child actress Ashley Thomas.
- Dan Butler as Bob "Bulldog" Briscoe (season 2); a shock jock who hosted KACL's Gonzo Sports Show in the show's original run
- Edward Hibbert as Gil Chesterton (season 2); an uppity food critic who hosted KACL's Restaurant Beat in the show's original run
- Harriet Sansom Harris as Bebe Glazer (season 2); Frasier's manipulative agent
- Rachel Bloom as Phoebe Glazer (season 2); Bebe's daughter

== Episodes ==
Season	Episodes	Originally released	
Season	Episodes	First released	Last released
1	10	October 12, 2023	December 7, 2023
2	10	September 19, 2024	November 14, 2024

=== Season 1 (2023) ===
No. overall	No. in season	Title	Directed by	Written by	Original release date	Prod. code
1	1	"The Good Father"	James Burrows	Joe Cristalli & Chris Harris	October 12, 2023	101
Accompanied by his nephew David, Frasier Crane returns to Boston after his father's funeral and his breakup from Charlotte to give a guest lecture at Harvard University as a favor to an old college classmate of his, Alan Cornwall. While in town, he drops in on his son Frederick, now a Boston firefighter, and Freddy's roommate, Eve, who Frasier assumes is Freddy's girlfriend. Frasier's relationship with Freddy has been tense since Freddy dropped out of Harvard and has been further strained since Freddy did not attend Martin's funeral. While Frasier tries to reconnect with Freddy, Alan's boss, Olivia, tries to recruit him to teach at Harvard and Freddy hides his living arrangements with Eve and her infant son John. Eventually, Freddy admits that Eve was the girlfriend of John's father, a fellow firefighter who fell in the line of duty, and that he did not attend Martin's funeral due to the mental anguish of his survivor's guilt. Frasier quickly decides to accept the job at Harvard and buys Eve and Freddy's apartment building to be a part of his son's life.: This episode is dedicated to the memory of John Mahoney who died on February 4, 2018. In other tributes, Eve’s child is named John and the bar where she works and the other characters often meet at is called "Mahoney's Taphouse." The founding date for Mahoney's is listed as 1940, the same year Mahoney himself was born. The episode was also dedicated to Gabrielle James and Archie Lyndhurst.
2	2	"Moving In"	James Burrows	Stephen Lloyd	October 12, 2023	102
Frasier tries to convince Freddy to move out of Eve's apartment and into his. Eve is eager for Freddy to accept as, while she is grateful for Freddy's support since her boyfriend died, Freddy's habits drive her crazy. Clashes quickly arise between father and son when Freddy's decor and tastes clash with Frasier's as much as Frasier's did with his own father. Olivia is eager to promote the fact that Frasier is now teaching at Harvard until Frasier unknowingly uses metaphors in the presence of a reporter that make it sound like he murdered his son. Meanwhile, Eve comes to rely on Frasier when she discovers that his voice lulls her baby to sleep, a reliance that Frasier misconstrues as romantic interest.
3	3	"First Class"	Kelly Park	Lauren Houseman	October 19, 2023	104
Frasier's teaching career at Harvard gets off to a rocky start, prompting Olivia to lean into his years as the host of daytime talk show "Dr. Crane" to drum up student interest. Embarrassed by this and yearning for the seriousness of academia, Frasier enlists Eve to attend his class undercover and stealthily guide his lecture away from showmanship; this fails when she begins openly arguing with David, who feels slighted that he was not invited to take part. Afterward, Olivia helps lift Frasier's spirits by reminding him of the good he is already achieving, and by revealing the impact that his show had on her in her younger years.
4	4	"Trivial Pursuits"	Kelsey Grammer	Bob Daily	October 26, 2023	103
Frasier, Olivia and Alan attend trivia night with Freddy and his firehouse, where Freddy interprets Frasier's comments on his performance as a slight against his chosen profession. At Eve's suggestion, Freddy invites Frasier to spend the day at the firehouse to see what his job actually entails, but it backfires when Frasier gets along with the other firefighters (aside from their pet Dalmatian) and only gets to ride along on a trivial call. When a major fire breaks out, Frasier admits to Eve that his seeming disdain of Freddy's career is motivated by fear of losing him like he used to fear losing his father as a child. Meanwhile, Alan and Olivia try and convince Eve that she was incorrect about the trivia answers, while Freddy's firehouse assumes that David is a homeless orphan when he shows up disheveled and hungry (he had gotten trapped in a library basement over the weekend) and mentions that his parents aren't around.
5	5	"The Founders' Society"	Phill Lewis	Farhan Arshad	November 2, 2023	105
Frasier, Alan, and Olivia are invited to join the Founders' Society, an elite club of Harvard's most distinguished faculty. They form an alliance to try and get each other accepted, but Alan gets a medieval gauntlet stuck on his hand and Olivia is forced to strike out on her own after hearing that only two positions are open and tricks the other two into talking to a waiter by saying that he's the dean. In the end, Olivia and Frasier are accepted while Alan admits that he does value their friendship. Meanwhile, David's attempt to woo Eve is so bad that it results in Freddy and Eve giving him a crash course in interacting with women, with both predictable and unpredictable results.
6	6	"Blind Date"	Kelly Park	Joe Cristalli	November 9, 2023	106
Frasier and Freddy both agree to be set up on blind dates by Eve; to neutralize Frasier's snobbery and Freddy's fear of intimacy, Eve doesn't tell them anything whatsoever about their dates. When a woman named June turns up at the Cranes' door, she rapidly finds common ground with both of them, leading to attempts to find out whom she's actually been fixed up with. It eventually turns out that June was meant for Freddy, but she ends up liking Frasier more. Eventually, Frasier's date arrives and Frasier wants to think about which woman he wants to pursue. When the women find out about this, they both leave in disgust. Meanwhile Eve invites Alan and Olivia to an experimental play written by a friend of hers, which even she admits is terrible.
7	7	"Freddy's Birthday"	Kelsey Grammer	Sasha Stroman	November 16, 2023	107
The inevitable reunion between Frasier and his infamous ex-wife Lilith finally occurs, much to Freddy's horror. Realizing that their constant bickering will only lead to him cutting both of them out of his life, the pair agree to both attend his birthday party and try to keep things civil. At the party, Lilith and Frasier descend into a predictable fight over who knows their son better. After nearly giving in to whatever tiny spark remains between them, they agree to separate family schedules to spare Freddy the drama. Meanwhile, Alan desperately tries to jog Lilith's memory of him, with hilarious results, while David and Eve try and make the party more enjoyable.
8	8	"The B Story"	Kelsey Grammer	Miles Woods	November 23, 2023	108
Frasier is delighted to discover that when drunk, Freddy sheds his working-class affectations and becomes a hyper-intelligent, erudite snob. Eve tries to get Frasier to do something about the bees that have infested their building's entrance, but Frasier becomes hyper-fixated on obtaining the rank of professor despite his lack of academic experience. Olivia agrees to help, but Frasier's obsession and a series of comic errors lead the tenure committee to believe that he is a drunkard. Meanwhile, Frasier gives David a B on a term paper, which sparks an existential crisis in him, until he too learns of Freddy's drunken personality change. The ending result is a B− which insults Freddy so much that he decides to help David with his next paper.
9	9	"The Fix Is In"	Victor Gonzalez	Robb Chavis	November 30, 2023	109
When Freddy complains about being treated like a child, Frasier suggests that he help with repairs around the apartment, but things get more complicated when Frasier's neuroses - and his age - catch up with him. Meanwhile, after five successive Teaching Assistants quit on Alan, Olivia gleefully assigns David to him.
10	10	"Reindeer Games"	Kelsey Grammer	Janene Lin & Jenna Martin & Naima Pearce	December 7, 2023	110
On Christmas Eve, Freddy stretches himself to be there for Frasier, who's coping with Martin's death by throwing a lavish party, and Eve, who's hiding out at home dealing with her own loss. Alan and David come up with a surprisingly fun party game, while Olivia finds herself drawn into a charming Christmas cliché with Freddy's coworker Moose. When Frasier hits a breaking point, Freddy's gift finally arrives in the form of Frasier's old friend Roz Doyle.

=== Season 2 (2024) ===
No. overall	No. in season	Title	Directed by	Written by	Original release date	Prod. code
11	1	"Ham"	James Burrows	Joe Cristalli & Chris Harris	September 19, 2024	201
Frasier and Alan's decades-old friendship is threatened when an old secret is revealed. Meanwhile, Eve and David grapple with a jamon iberico.
12	2	"Cyrano, Cyrano"	Kelsey Grammer	Joe Cristalli & Chris Harris	September 19, 2024	206
When his date cancels on him at the last minute, Frasier becomes determined to give Cupid a win on Valentine's Day. Unfortunately, he inadvertently takes both sides of Olivia and Moose's troubled relationship.
13	3	"All About Eve"	Kelsey Grammer	Miles Woods	September 26, 2024	203
When Roz takes Eve and Olivia out for a girls' night, Frasier, Alan and Freddy are upset that they have to watch Eve's baby instead of meeting women. However, their evening changes when they realise that a baby just might be the perfect icebreaker.
14	4	"The Dedication"	James Burrows	Matt Kuhn	October 3, 2024	202
When Frasier learns that Freddy has been seeing a therapist, he tracks her down to find out what's wrong and makes a rash decision in the process; Freddy and Eve help each other get through the anniversary of Adam's passing together.
15	5	"The Squash Courtship of Freddy's Father"	Jude Weng	Sasha Stroman	October 10, 2024	207
Thunderstorms herald the arrival of Frasier's agent Bebe Glazer. Frasier wonders how he can have more in common with her daughter, Phoebe (Rachel Bloom) than with his own son. Meanwhile, Olivia starts stealing Alan's ideas in conversation.
16	6	"Cape Cod"	Sheldon Epps	Joe Cristalli & Chris Harris	October 17, 2024	208
When Frasier sees that Eve is ready to date again, he enlists Roz's help to plan a romantic weekend for her and Freddy at a beach house in Cape Cod; but when Freddy sees their work, he and Eve suspect something else and take actions of their own. When Roz's daughter Alice arrives, David swiftly develops a crush on her.
17	7	"My Brilliant Sister"	Kelly Park	Max Maduka	October 24, 2024	204
When Frasier hears that a reclusive author is at his own tailgate party, he enlists Alan and David's help in locating him; a mix-up between Freddy and Eve forces Olivia to deal with two fake boyfriends as she tries to impress her sister.
18	8	"Thank You, Dr. Crane"	Kelsey Grammer	Stephen Lloyd	October 31, 2024	205
When Frasier returns to Seattle for a KACL anniversary special, he reconnects with a former caller whose life went off the rails.
19	9	"Murder Most Finch"	Sheldon Epps	Eliot Fish & Allison Gilbert	November 7, 2024	209
When Olivia hosts a surprise murder mystery party, Frasier tries everything he can to get himself and his date out of the evening's festivities.
20	10	"Father Christmas"	Kelsey Grammer	Bob Daily	November 14, 2024	210
As Christmas approaches, Frasier enlists the entire gang to help Alan reunite with his estranged daughter and meet his new grandchild. Note: This is the series finale.

== Production ==
=== Background ===
Talks of a revival began in 2016 but were initially denied by Grammer, though they resurfaced in mid-to-late 2018, with Grammer confirming it was being looked into. In February and March 2019, he said in several interviews that a reboot was likely. He indicated a new season would pay tribute to John Mahoney, who portrayed Martin, Frasier's father in the original run of Frasier and died in 2018.

In late 2019, Grammer said "we've hatched the plan" for a Frasier revival and it was originally reported that it would air in 2020. In February 2021, it was reported that the revival was being discussed at Paramount+, possibly for a 10-episode season order for 2022.

=== Announcement ===
On February 24, 2021, the revival was greenlit for an exclusive debut on Paramount+. Grammer said he "gleefully" anticipated "sharing the next chapter in the continuing journey of Dr. Frasier Crane" as he had "spent over 20 years" of his "creative life on the Paramount lot". Paramount+ officially gave the revival a 10-episode season order in October 2022.

=== Casting ===
Casting director Jeff Greenberg returned. David Hyde Pierce had multiple conversations with the showrunners about reprising his role as Frasier's brother, Niles, but it was later reported that he had declined (as Pierce did not think there was much for Niles to do in the revival) and that the other actors from the original series were also either not returning or unlikely to return. Jane Leeves, who played Martin's physical therapist and Niles' love interest (later wife), Daphne Moon, and Peri Gilpin, who played Frasier's producer and close friend Roz Doyle, had previously discussed the possibility of a revival.

In January 2023, Jack Cutmore-Scott joined the cast as Freddy Crane. It was also reported that English actor Nicholas Lyndhurst would be joining the cast. Later that month, Anders Keith was cast as Niles and Daphne's son, David, while Jess Salgueiro was cast as Freddy's roommate, Eve. In February, Toks Olagundoye was cast as Olivia.

In March 2023, it was announced that Bebe Neuwirth would be reprising her role as Frasier's ex-wife Lilith Sternin in the revival. In April 2023, it was announced that Gilpin would also reprise her role as Roz. Both would reportedly feature in guest or recurring roles, not main cast.

=== Filming ===
On January 30, 2023, Greenberg shared a picture of a script page from a table read which gave some more information about the show. The first episode would be called "The Good Father" in a reference to the pilot episode of the original series being called "The Good Son". It was written by Joe Cristalli and Chris Harris and directed by veteran sitcom director James Burrows, who directed episodes of the original run and will also direct the episode following "The Good Father". The first episode of the revival was filmed in February 2023. Lead actor Kelsey Grammer directed the seventh episode, "Freddy's Birthday", which was filmed on April 4, 2023. Filming for the series wrapped on May 2, 2023; one day after the 2023 Writers Guild of America strike commenced, which meant the writers could not be on set for filming night.

News broke on May 9, 2024, that the second season had started production, with James Burrows once again tapped to direct the first two episodes, along with the announcement that Peri Gilpin would again reprise her role as Roz for multiple episodes. The second season was filmed at Paramount Studios on Stage 18, with recordings taking place every Tuesday.

== Release ==
The revival premiered on October 12, 2023, on Paramount+. The first two episodes of the Frasier revival also aired on October 17, 2023, on CBS.

An "inside the series" episode was released on October 6, 2023, on Paramount+, and the next day aired on CBS affiliate stations.

The second season was released on September 19, 2024, with a two-episode premiere, once again on Paramount+.

== Reception ==
On the review aggregator website Rotten Tomatoes, 60% of 73 critics' reviews are positive, with an average rating of 6.1/10. The website's consensus reads: "With Kelsey Grammer safely back in the role he was born to play, Frasier scores as comfort viewing even if it can't quite compare to the classic original series."
