= 22 Chaser =

2018 Canadian film directed by Rafal Sokolowski

- Official poster
- Directed by: Rafal Sokolowski
- Screenplay by: Jeremy Boxen
- Produced by: Don Carmody; Daniel Bekerman; Aeschylus Poulos
- Starring: Brian J. Smith; Raoul Trujillo; Aaron Ashmore; Kaniehtiio Horn; John Kapelos
- Cinematography: Cabot McNenly
- Edited by: Kye Meechan; Jane McRae
- Music by: Igor Vrabac; Ken Worth
- Production companies: CFC Features; Don Carmody Productions; Hawkeye Pictures; Scythia Films
- Distributed by: Level Film
- Release dates: April 12, 2018 (Toronto); July 6, 2018 (Canada)
- Running time: 90 minutes
- Country: Canada
- Language: English

22-Chaser is a 2018 Canadian thriller drama film directed by Rafal Sokolowski, written by Jeremy Boxen, and starring Brian J. Smith, Raoul Trujillo, Aaron Ashmore, Kaniehtiio Horn, and John Kapelos. The story centers on a tow truck driver who has to decide whether to abandon his moral code in order to provide for his family. Produced by Don Carmody, Daniel Beckerman, and Aeschylus Poulos, it was released on July 6, 2018, in Canada.

== Plot ==
Ben Dankert works as a Toronto tow truck driver picking up illegally parked cars. His family is in financial trouble with his wife using food banks and his son being bullied for being poor. Meanwhile, Ben's tow truck competitors make big money as "chasers", racing to accidents and exploiting the victims with tolls, and add-on services. His boss offers the prospect of a profitable Police contract but demands a large rental payment for the truck which Ben cannot afford. Then his friend persuades him to take a $5000 loan from a corrupt police officer with a sideline as a loan-shark. To pay back the loan Ben has to decide whether to abandon his moral code and become a "chaser", going head to head with unscrupulous rivals, some of whom are violent psychopaths.

== Cast ==
- Brian J. Smith as Ben Dankert
- Raoul Trujillo as Wayne (Raoul Max Trujillo)
- Aaron Ashmore as Sean
- Kaniehtiio Horn as Avery Dankert
- John Kapelos as Bissey
- Shaun Benson as Elvis
- Aidan Devine as Ray
- Jack Fulton as Zach Dankert
- Lisa Codrington as Connie
- Wole Darmola as Kaleb
- Thom Allison as Teeny
- Sonya Cote as Rhonda Bissey

== Production ==
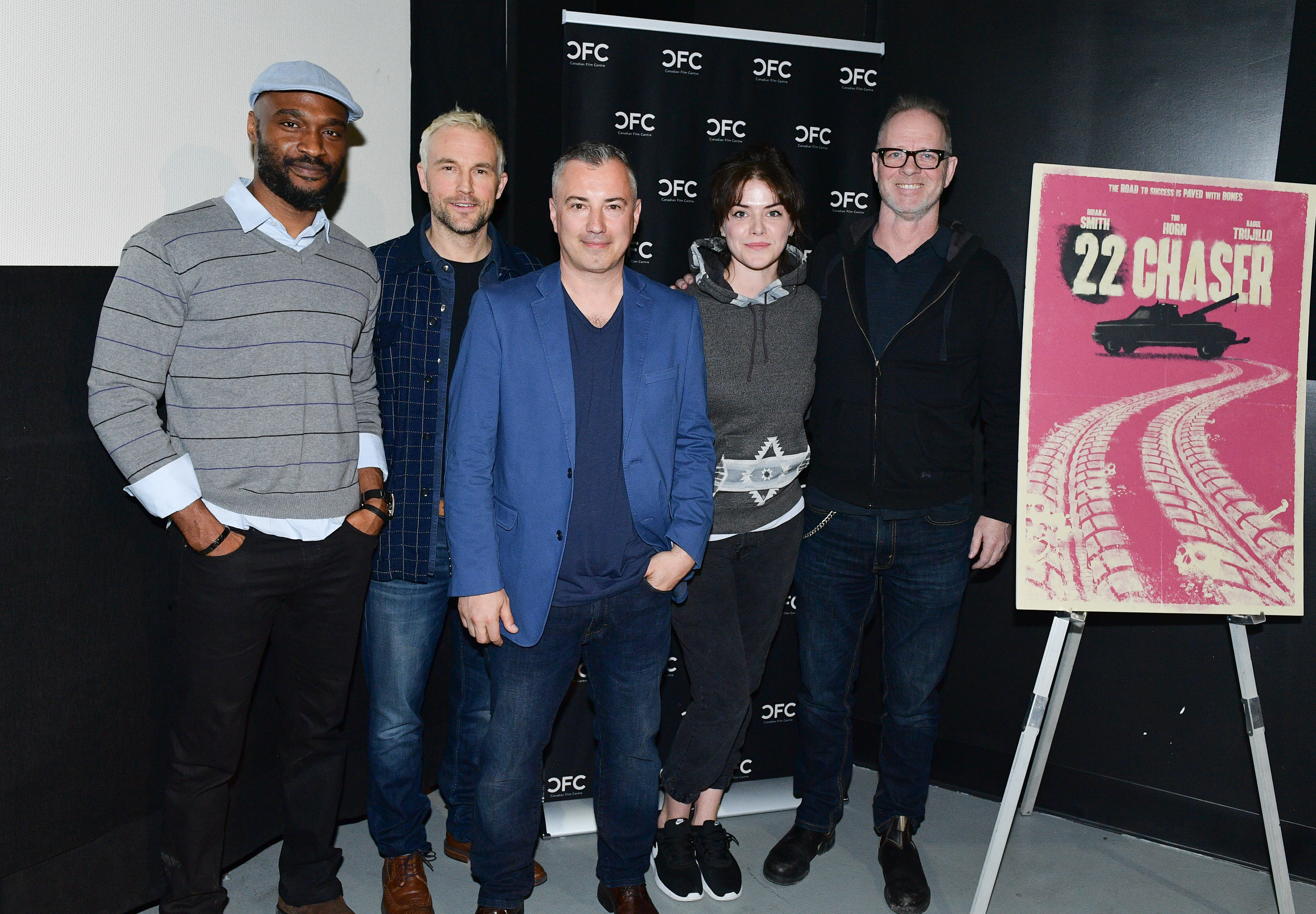
Wole Darmola, Shaun Benson, Rafal Sokolowski, Tiio Horn and Aidan Devine at the premiere of 22 Chaser on National Canadian Film Day 2018 at Scotiabank Theatre

22 Chaser is the directorial debut feature film of Rafal Sokolowski, a film and theatre director and assistant professor of film at Ohio University. It was developed, financed and produced through the Canadian Film Centre's CFC Features program. The central theme of the story is the crisis of masculinity in the modern world. This is conveyed through the contrast and tensions between the main character's two lives - the dangerous and brutal work of chasing accidents and his private family life at home. Following this theme, writer Jeremy Boxen took care to first create the family drama so that the audience would appreciate the motivations and emotional conflicts in the tow-truck storyline. The characters of the chasers were designed to have evolved from their extreme and violent surroundings.

To research the story, Sokolowski took several nights accompanying various tow truck "chasers" in their work. He commented on his experiences: " ... I was intimidated to arrive at the scene of an accident where real tears, real stress, real tragedy unfolds, and these truck drivers dive in - and some of them are amazing heroes and some of them find a way to squeeze a buck out of human tragedy. ... " Sokolowski also described the casting of Brian J. Smith as the best casting decision of his career as Smith quickly produced a naturalistic and deep characterisation.

Production began in 2015 and was centred in Toronto, Canada. Some of the challenges were the use of sophisticated technology, a large cast, many road scenes filmed at night with multiple cameras, a fleet of 39 vehicles and complex stunt scenes. Sokolowski shared credit for meeting these challenges with the pre-filming work of the creative producers, director of photography and his team, and the departmental heads. While for the action scenes he credited the stunt coordinator, stunt drivers and stunt performers. For filming the family scenes, long detailed single shots were used for realism, while the editing was aimed at balancing the two narratives. Sokolowski' s direction included detailed rehearsals with the cast.

== Release ==
22 Chaser premiered as part of National Canadian Film Day on April 18, 2018, at Scotiabank Theatre, Toronto. It was released on DVD and streaming on July 17, 2018, and had a theatrical release from October 12, 2018.

== Reception ==
In his review of 22 Chaser for the Los Angeles Times, Noel Murray praised the story and its realistic themes but felt the character of Ben was too intelligent and capable to have fallen into such a predicament. He commented: " ... Its a reasonably grabby tale despite its familiarity and trying too hard to make its milieu menacing ... ". Reviewing for Now Toronto, Norman Wilner complimented the visual style of the direction, the performances, cinematography and pacing of the story but criticized a lack of energy and a still atmosphere. He considered: " ... Rafal Sokolowski's 22 Chaser is a great-looking, entirely respectable first feature. It's not nearly as compelling as it wants to be but it's always watchable. ... ". Andrew Parker, for The Gate, gave a score of 8 from 10, praising the direction, cinematography, the tension of the story, and the actors, particularly Smith. He commented: " ... The characters collide with each other perfectly, leading to an increasingly complex plot that feels earned and organic. .... ".

== Awards ==
The film's editors, Kye Meechan and Jane McCrae, were nominated for the Canadian Cinema Editors Award for Best Editing in a Feature Film.
