= My Tree =

2021 Canadian documentary film

- Directed by: Jason Sherman
- Written by: Jason Sherman
- Produced by: Sonya Di Rienzo; Aeschylus Poulos; Jason Sherman; Matt Code
- Cinematography: John Minh Tran
- Edited by: Ben Lawrence
- Music by: Studiocat
- Production companies: Hawkeye Pictures; Some Canadian
- Distributed by: Hawkeye Pictures; WaZabi Films
- Release date: April 29, 2021 (Hot Docs)
- Running time: 102 minutes
- Country: Canada
- Language: English

My Tree is a Canadian documentary film, directed by Jason Sherman and released in 2021. The film centres on his trip to Israel to locate a tree that was planted in his name decades earlier.

The film premiered at the 2021 Hot Docs Canadian International Documentary Festival.

The film received a Canadian Screen Award nomination for Best Feature Length Documentary at the 10th Canadian Screen Awards in 2022, and Ben Lawrence won the award for Best Editing in a Documentary,
