= Emily Lê =

Canadian actress

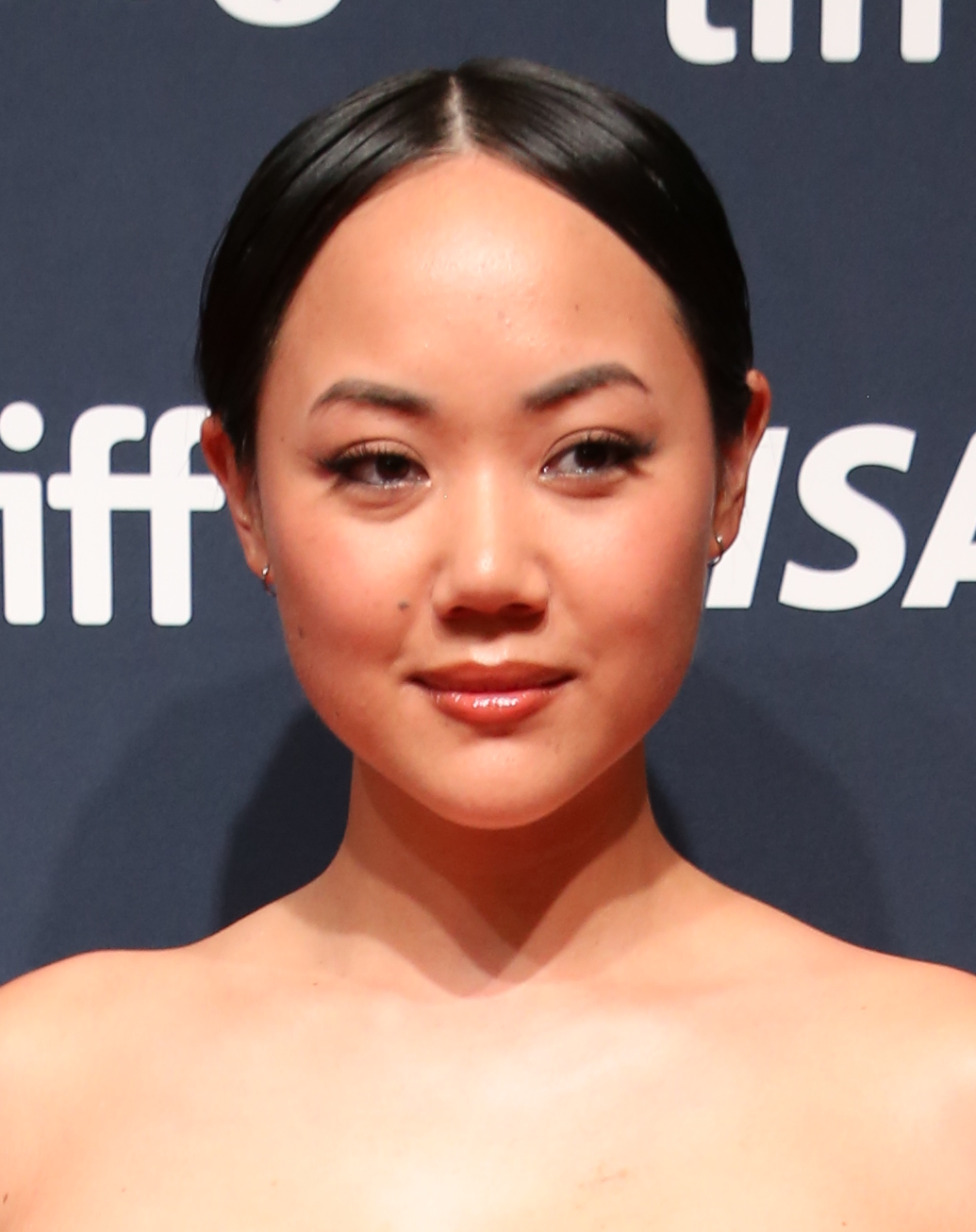
- Emily Lê, at the 2024 Toronto International Film Festival (TIFF).

Emily Lê is a Canadian actress. She is most noted for her performance as Sonny in the 2024 film Paying for It, for which she earned an ACTRA award for Best Lead Performance in 2025, and received a Canadian Screen Award nomination for Best Lead Performance in a Comedy Film at the 13th Canadian Screen Awards in 2025.

She has also appeared in the films Peace by Chocolate, Riceboy Sleeps and Mile End Kicks, and the television series So Long, Marianne.
