= Canadian Strain =

- Poster
- Directed by: Geordie Sabbagh
- Produced by: Ashleigh Rains
- Starring: Jess Salgueiro
- Cinematography: Andrew Curr
- Edited by: Michael G. England
- Music by: Erik Arnesen
- Production company: We'll Be Over Here Productions
- Distributed by: Pacific Northwest Pictures
- Release date: December 7, 2019 (Whistler)
- Running time: 79 minutes
- Country: Canada
- Language: English

Canadian Strain is a 2019 Canadian comedy film, directed by Geordie Sabbagh. The film stars Jess Salgueiro as Anne Banting, a drug dealer whose livelihood is disrupted by the 2018 legalization of cannabis in Canada.

The film's cast also includes Thom Allison, Benjamin Ayres, Natalie Brown, Colin Mochrie, Ashleigh Rains, Naomi Snieckus and Maria Vacratsis.

Production on the film commenced in August 2018.

The film premiered at the Whistler Film Festival on December 7, 2019. It was slated to premiere commercially on March 20, 2020, but following the closure of public venues due to the COVID-19 pandemic, the producers shifted to online distribution, releasing the film on the Apple TV platform on March 17.

== Cast ==
- Jess Salgueiro as Anne Banting
- Benjamin Ayres as Luke
- Colin Mochrie as Jack Banting
- Maria Vacratsis as Barbara Banting
- Naomi Snieckus as Judy
- Natalie Brown as Valerie
- Thom Allison as Gary
