= Deception (2018 TV series) =

2018 US crime drama television series

- Genre: Crime drama
- Created by: Chris Fedak
- Starring: Jack Cutmore-Scott; Ilfenesh Hadera; Lenora Crichlow; Justin Chon; Laila Robins; Amaury Nolasco; Vinnie Jones
- Composers: Blake Neely; Nathaniel Blume
- Country of origin: United States
- Original language: English
- No. of seasons: 1
- No. of episodes: 13

Production
- Executive producers: Greg Berlanti; Chris Fedak; Martin Gero; Sarah Schechter; David Nutter
- Producers: Chad McQuay; Ryan Lindenberg; David Kwong
- Production location: New York City
- Cinematography: John Lindley
- Running time: 43 minutes
- Production companies: Berlanti Productions; VHPT Company; Warner Bros. Television

Original release
- Network: ABC
- Release: March 11 – May 27, 2018

Deception is an American crime procedural drama television series created for ABC by Chris Fedak. The series was produced by Berlanti Productions and VHPT Company in association with Warner Bros. Television, with Fedak serving as showrunner. The series premiered on March 11, 2018.

The series starred Jack Cutmore-Scott as Cameron Black, a superstar magician who joins the FBI as a consulting illusionist to help them solve crimes after his career is ruined by a scandal. Ilfenesh Hadera, Lenora Crichlow, Justin Chon, Laila Robins, Amaury Nolasco, and Vinnie Jones also star in the show. In September 2016, the series received a pilot production commitment at ABC, and received a pilot order in January 2017. The cast was filled out in early 2017, and filming on the pilot began in New York City in March 2017. The series was officially ordered by ABC in May 2017.

On May 11, 2018, ABC cancelled the show after one season.

== Premise ==
After his career as a magician is ruined by a scandal, Las Vegas illusionist Cameron Black becomes the world's first "consulting illusionist" as he works with the FBI to solve odd crimes.

== Cast and characters ==
=== Main ===
- Jack Cutmore-Scott as Cameron Black, a Las Vegas illusionist who works with the FBI to solve crimes. Cutmore-Scott also portrays Cameron's twin brother, Jonathan Black.
  - Danny Corbo as young Cameron Black
  - Sonny Corbo as young Jonathan Black
- Ilfenesh Hadera as Kay Daniels, a take-charge, hard-working FBI special agent who teams up with Black
- Lenora Crichlow as Dina Clark, Black's producer/makeup artist
- Justin Chon as Jordan Kwon, a street magician who works on Black's team
- Laila Robins as Deakins, an FBI special agent and Daniels and Alvarez's unit's commander
- Amaury Nolasco as Mike Alvarez, a classic FBI agent who is secretly a huge fan of magic, and of Cameron Black in particular
- Vinnie Jones as Gunter Gastafsen, hailed as the "world's greatest illusion builder"

=== Recurring ===
- Stephanie Corneliussen as "the mystery woman", a mysterious woman from Jonathan's past known as "The Sorceress with Magic Eyes"
  - Alexandra Lenarchyk as young girl
- Naren Weiss as Dekker, the "weapons visionary" for the mysterious woman
- Evan Parke as Winslow, an inmate who coerces Jonathan to do odd jobs for him
- Billy Zane as "Switch", an artist with ties to the mysterious woman
- Tanc Sade as Lance Bauer

=== Guest ===
- Brett Dalton as Isaac Walker, a CIA agent who has a romantic past with Kay
- Jack Davenport as Sebastian Black
- Mario Van Peebles as Bruce Conners

== Episodes ==
No.	Title	Directed by	Written by	Original release date	Prod. code	U.S. viewers (millions)
1	"Pilot"	David Nutter	Chris Fedak	March 11, 2018	T15.10141	5.93
Cameron’s brother Jonathan Black is revealed to the world in the worst possible way: blamed for a death in a car accident. However, Jonathan knows he was framed, as the supposed victim was heterochromatic while the actual victim was not. One year later, a plane containing a drug lord in a hangar appears to explode under FBI custody. However, Cameron realizes that it was an illusion and that the plane was dragged out from the back of the hangar. Cameron makes a deal with FBI agent Kay Daniels: he [with his magic team] will help the FBI find and catch the drug lord in exchange for the FBI's help in clearing Jonathan’s name. After catching the drug lord, Kay finds a phone at the hangar. Cameron finds that the person who helped make the plane disappear is the same mystery woman that framed Jonathan.
2	"Forced Perspective"	Michael Lehmann	Chris Fedak	March 18, 2018	T33.10002	3.97
3	"Escapology"	Mike Smith	Elizabeth Peterson	March 25, 2018	T33.10003	3.86
4	"Divination"	Kevin Tancharoen	Kai Yu Wu	April 1, 2018	T33.10004	4.00
5	"Masking"	Silver Tree	Nelson Greaves	April 8, 2018	T33.10005	3.61
6	"Black Art"	Rob Seidenglanz	Sam Sklaver	April 22, 2018	T33.10006	3.24
7	"Sacrifice 99 to Fool One"	Rob Hardy	John A. Norris	April 24, 2018	T33.10007	3.10
8	"Multiple Outs"	Glen Winter	Bryan Malone	April 29, 2018	T33.10008	3.64
9	"Getting Away Clean"	Michael Lehmann	Joe Peracchio	May 6, 2018	T33.10009	3.25
10	"The Unseen Hand"	Lexi LaRoche	Cesar Mazariegos	May 13, 2018	T33.10010	3.37
11	"Loading Up"	Carol Banker	John A. Norris & Nelson Greaves	May 20, 2018	T33.10011	3.18
12	"Code Act"	Dermott Downs	Brynn Malone & Sam Sklaver	May 27, 2018	T33.10012	2.26
13	"Transposition"	Michael Lehmann	Chris Fedak & Elizabeth Peterson	May 27, 2018	T33.10013	2.26

== Production ==
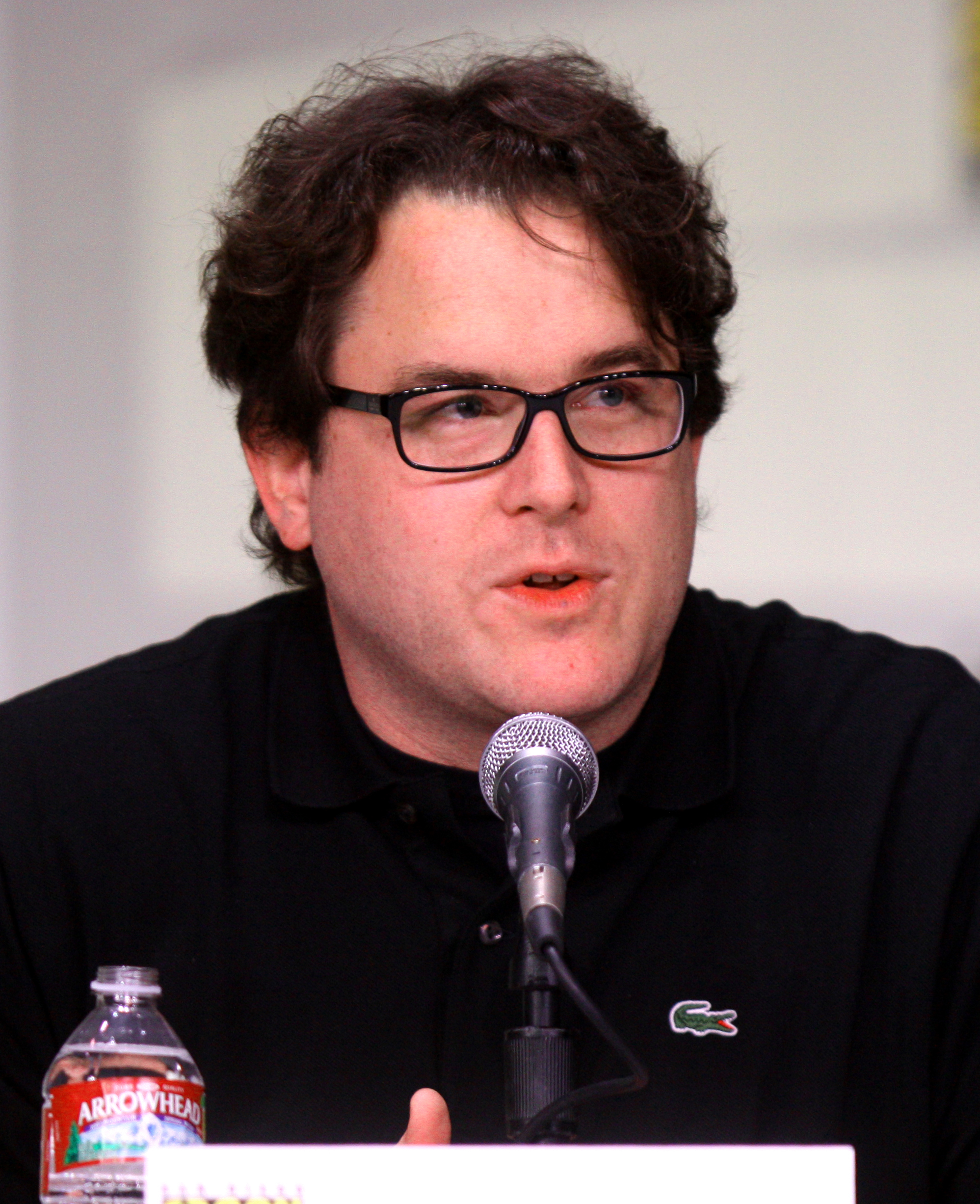
Chris Fedak serves as showrunner and writer on the series.

Deception was given a pilot production commitment by ABC on September 14, 2016, with the project being developed by Chris Fedak and magician David Kwong. The pilot was ordered on January 19, 2017, followed by a series order a few months later on May 12. On February 10, 2017, Jack Cutmore-Scott was cast in the lead role as Cameron Black, followed a few days later by the casting of Ilfenesh Hadera as Kay Daniels, Lenora Crichlow as Dina Clark, and Amaury Nolasco as Mike Alvarez. The following month, Justin Chon joined the cast as Jordan Kwon, while Vinnie Jones was cast as Gunter Gastafsen. In May 2017, it was revealed that Laila Robins had been cast as special agent Deakins.

Production on the pilot began in March 2017, with filming taking place in New York City. Filming for the rest of the season began in September 2017, and ended in February 2018. The series is composed by Blake Neely and Nathaniel Blume.

== Release ==
Deception began airing on March 11, 2018, on ABC in the United States, and on CTV in Canada. The pilot was screened on July 19, 2017, at San Diego Comic-Con. On October 8, 2017, members of the cast and the executive producers attended New York Comic Con to promote the series and screen the pilot.

== Reception ==
=== Ratings ===
Viewership and ratings per episode of Deception
No.	Title	Air date	Rating/share (18–49)	Viewers (millions)	DVR (18–49)	DVR viewers (millions)	Total (18–49)	Total viewers (millions)
1	"Pilot"	March 11, 2018	1.2/4	5.93	—N/a	—N/a	—N/a	—N/a
2	"Forced Perspective"	March 18, 2018	0.8/3	3.97	—N/a	2.28	—N/a	6.25
3	"Escapology"	March 25, 2018	0.7/3	3.86	—N/a	2.06	—N/a	5.92
4	"Divination"	April 1, 2018	0.8/3	4.00	—N/a	—N/a	—N/a	—N/a
5	"Masking"	April 8, 2018	0.7/3	3.61	—N/a	2.13	—N/a	5.74
6	"Black Art"	April 22, 2018	0.6/3	3.24	—N/a	2.09	—N/a	5.33
7	"Sacrifice 99 to Fool One"	April 24, 2018	0.7/3	3.10	—N/a	1.77	—N/a	4.87
8	"Multiple Outs"	April 29, 2018	0.8/3	3.64	—N/a	—N/a	—N/a	—N/a
9	"Getting Away Clean"	May 6, 2018	0.7/3	3.25	—N/a	—N/a	—N/a	—N/a
10	"The Unseen Hand"	May 13, 2018	0.7/3	3.37	—N/a	—N/a	—N/a	—N/a
11	"Loading Up"	May 20, 2018	0.6/3	3.18	—N/a	—N/a	—N/a	—N/a
12	"Code Act"	May 27, 2018	0.4/2	2.26	0.4	1.82	0.8	4.08
13	"Transposition"	May 27, 2018	0.4/2	2.26	0.4	1.82	0.8	4.08

=== International success ===
In France, under the name "Cameron Black: l'illusionniste", it became a ratings hit, becoming the number one show in its timeslot.

In Germany, after airing only 7 episodes, Deception had already broken viewing records.

=== Critical response ===
The review aggregator website Rotten Tomatoes reported a 60% approval rating with an average rating of 6.01/10 based on 9 reviews. The website's consensus reads, "Deception isn't particularly original or thoughtful, but there's still some lighthearted fun to be found hidden up its sleeve." Audience reaction on the same website has a 93% approval rating. Metacritic, which uses a weighted average, assigned a score of 51 out of 100 based on 8 critics, indicating "mixed or average reviews". According to The New York Times, Deception scores 3 out of 5, and that it is one of the latest shows that are trying to be Castle.

=== Awards and online polls ===
In E!'s TVScoopAwards, Deception dominated categories, winning 3 awards including Worst Shocker, Breakout Actor (Jack Cutmore-Scott), and Best new 2017/18 Show.
