= Brad Abrahams =

Canadian documentary filmmaker

- Born: Toronto, Ontario, Canada
- Occupations: Documentary filmmaker; director; editor; writer
- Years active: 2017–present
- Website: bradabrahams.net

Brad Abrahams is a Canadian documentary filmmaker, director, writer, and editor based in Austin, Texas. His work focuses on marginalised subcultures, conspiracy culture, cryptozoology, and what he describes as "the fringes of human experience." His feature documentary debut, Love and Saucers (2017), about a man who claims a lifelong romantic relationship with an extraterrestrial being, won the Jury Prize at Fantastic Fest in Austin and became a cult streaming hit. Abrahams has stated that he is "obsessed with stories that let us probe the nature of belief" and approaches his subjects "with a nonjudgmental and human lens, with the goal of creating empathy." He serves as a correspondent for the QAnon Anonymous podcast and co-hosts the Spectral Voyager podcast.

== Background ==
Abrahams was born in Toronto, Ontario, Canada in 1977 or 1978. He moved to the United States in 2007 and is based in Austin, Texas. He has worked as a commercial director in addition to his documentary work, with his films drawing from what he describes as "all-consuming interests in weird science and general esoterica." His production company is Extrasensory Pictures Inc.

== Career ==
=== Love and Saucers (2017) ===
Love and Saucers is Abrahams' feature documentary debut. The film profiles David Huggins, a Hoboken resident who claims to have had a lifetime of encounters with extraterrestrial beings, including a romantic and sexual relationship with an alien woman he calls Crescent, whom he says he first encountered at age 17. Huggins documented these experiences in a large body of surreal, impressionistic paintings.

The film screened at the Miami International Film Festival in 2017 and subsequently at more than a dozen additional festivals. It won the Jury Prize at Fantastic Fest in Austin, Texas, as well as Best Feature at Lift-Off Los Angeles and Best Feature at Lift-Off Amsterdam.

The film was acquired by The Orchard/1091/Screen Media and released in 2018, landing streaming exclusives on Hulu and later Discovery+, and receiving a sold-out Blu-ray release through Vinegar Syndrome. The Los Angeles Times described it as "a story as detailed and unsettling as any horror/science-fiction epic," while Gizmodo's io9 called it "a sweet little documentary that'll make you believe in aliens." The film holds a Rotten Tomatoes critical consensus page. Screen-Space also reviewed the film upon release.

=== Conspiracy Cruise (2019) ===
Conspiracy Cruise is a 12-minute narrative short film written and directed by Abrahams, starring Henry Zebrowski. The film imagines what would happen if conspiracy theories came true aboard a cruise ship populated entirely by conspiracy theorists. It was inspired by journalist Anna Merlan's reporting on a real conspiracy theorist cruise and produced with support from Borscht Corp. Abrahams conceived the project as a proof-of-concept for a potential feature or series, envisioning each episode following a different conspiracy theory coming true on board.

=== Do You See What I See? (2021) ===
Do You See What I See? is a 12-minute documentary profiling the late David Dees (1957–2020), a graphic artist who spent 17 years illustrating for Sesame Street magazine before turning to conspiracy-themed digital artwork. The film, completed after Dees's death in May 2020, explores his transformation from mainstream commercial illustrator to controversial fringe artist. It was produced by Extrasensory Pictures Inc and received a Vimeo Staff Pick and a Short of the Week feature upon its release. A public screening of the film was hosted by Moviate as part of a programme of Abrahams' short work.

=== Swan Song of the Skunk Ape (2021) ===
Swan Song of the Skunk Ape is a short documentary exploring the legend of the Skunk Ape, a Bigfoot-like cryptid reported in South Florida. The film features interviews with a man-hunter, a cryptozoologist, an indigenous conservationist, and an erotic photographer about the creature and the communities that believe in it.

=== Telos or Bust! (2021) ===
Telos or Bust! is a 15-minute short documentary directed by Abrahams that serves as the pilot for his in-development episodic series Keep Folklore Alive!, a docu-series about bizarre folklore from around the world to be hosted by Richard Ayoade and co-created with Kai Wada Roath and Matt Ralston. The film examines residents of Mount Shasta, California who share beliefs in underground civilisations, ascended masters, crystals, and lost continents, interviewing a guru, a channeller, a historian, and a scientist.

The film had its world premiere at the Fantasia International Film Festival in August 2021, and subsequently screened at Slamdance 2022, Palm Springs International ShortFest, Fantastic Fest, and Beyond Fest, and was named a Short of the Week pick. Reviewing the film at Slamdance, When It Was Cool noted that Abrahams "lets the interviewees speak for themselves without editorial comment."

=== Fur (in development) ===
Fur is Abrahams' first scripted feature film, announced in Variety in 2025. The film tells a fictionalized account of Albert Ostman, a Canadian logger who claimed in the 1950s to have been abducted by a Sasquatch in the British Columbia wilderness in 1924. The film stars Frank Mosley.

== Filmography ==
=== Feature documentaries ===
Year	Title	Director	Notes
2017	Love and Saucers	Yes	Jury Prize, Fantastic Fest; Best Feature, Lift-Off Los Angeles; Best Feature, Lift-Off Amsterdam; Hulu; Discovery+; Vinegar Syndrome Blu-ray
2026	Gimme Truth	Yes	codirector with Simon Ennis

=== Short films ===
Year	Title	Director	Notes
2019	Conspiracy Cruise	Yes	Narrative short; stars Henry Zebrowski; produced with Borscht Corp
2021	Do You See What I See?	Yes	Documentary short; 12 min; Vimeo Staff Pick; Short of the Week feature
2021	Swan Song of the Skunk Ape	Yes	Documentary short; subject: Skunk Ape cryptid legend of South Florida
2021	Telos or Bust!	Yes	Documentary short; 15 min; pilot for Keep Folklore Alive!; Fantasia 2021 world premiere; Slamdance 2022; Fantastic Fest; Short of the Week pick

=== Scripted features (in development) ===
Year	Title	Director	Notes
TBA	Fur	Yes	Stars Frank Mosley; announced Variety, 2025
