= Meaghan Rath =

Canadian actress (born 1986)

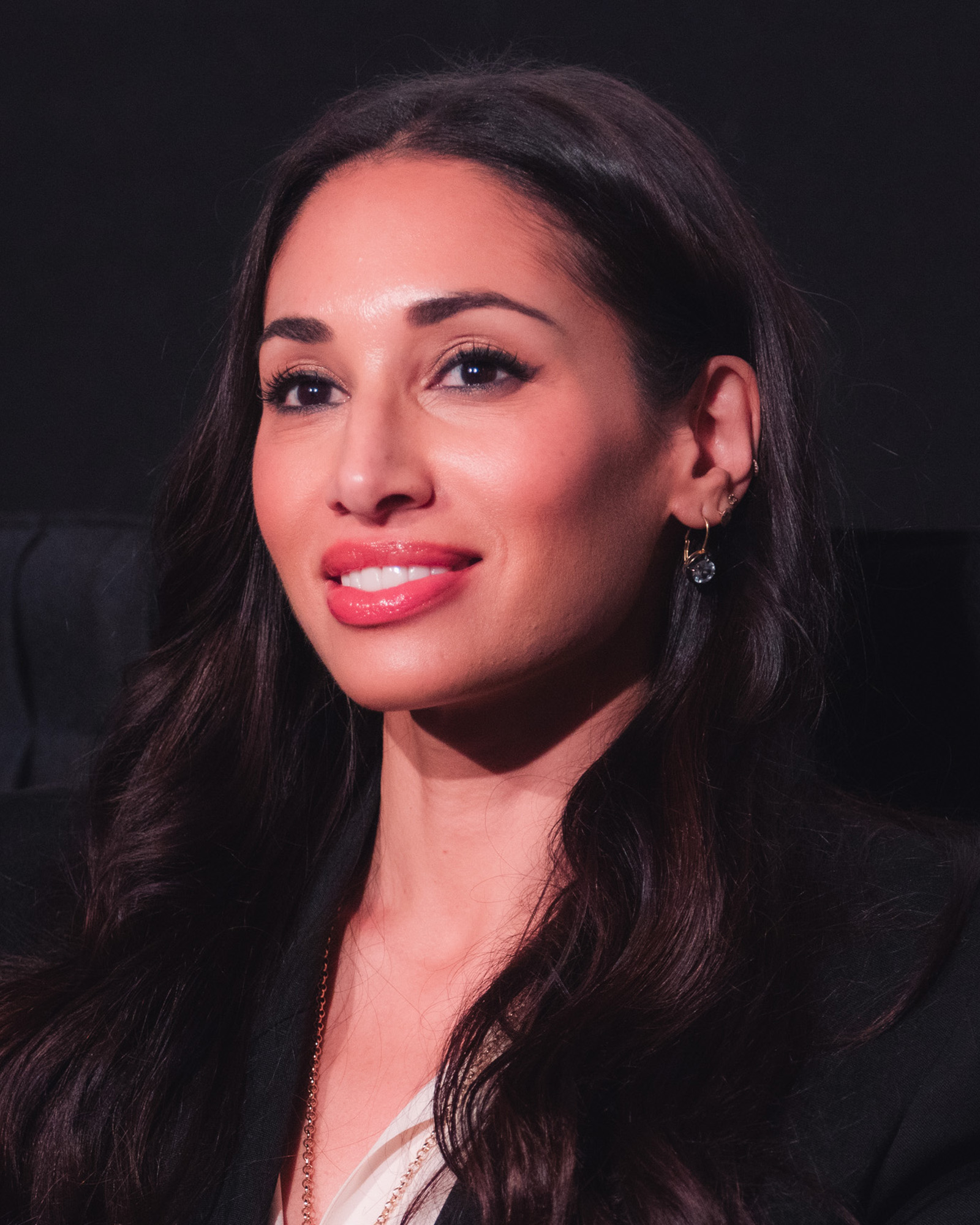
- Rath in 2026
- Born: June 18, 1986 (age 40); Montreal, Quebec, Canada
- Occupation: Actress
- Years active: 2001–present
- Spouse: Jack Cutmore-Scott (m. 2020)
- Children: 2
- Relatives: Jesse Rath (brother)

Meaghan Rath (born June 18, 1986) is a Canadian actress. She is known for her television roles on Being Human, 15/Love, The Assistants, and Hawaii Five-0.

== Early life and education ==
Rath was born in Montreal, Quebec, Canada. Her mother is of Indian Goan heritage. Her father is of English and Austrian-Jewish descent. She has a younger brother, Jesse Rath, who is also an actor. She studied Cinema and Communications at Dawson College.

== Personal life ==
On May 16, 2020, Rath married English actor Jack Cutmore-Scott at their Hollywood Hills home. The couple's first son was born in 2021, followed by their second son in 2023.

== Filmography ==
=== Film ===
Year	Title	Role	Notes
2001	Lost and Delirious	Allison's Friend #3	
2008	Prom Wars: Love Is a Battlefield	Jen L.	
2010	You Are So Undead	Mary Margaret	Short film
2013	Three Night Stand	Sue	Also executive producer
2020	Uprising!	Carmen	Short film
2025	Untitled Home Invasion Romance	Suzie	

=== Television ===
Year	Title	Role	Notes
2004	Fries with That?	Customer / Molly	2 episodes
2006	10.5: Apocalypse	Rachel	Television miniseries
2004–2006	15/Love	Adena Stiles	Main role
2007	I Me Wed	Tracy	Television film
2007	My Daughter's Secret	Courtney	Television film
2007	Heartland	Jen	Episode: "Coming Home"
2009	Aaron Stone	Tatianna Caine	2 episodes
2009	The Assistants	Rigby Hastings	Main role
2010–2011	18 to Life	Violet / Erin Boyd	2 episodes
2011	Cyberbully	Cheyenne Mortenson	Television film
2011–2014	Being Human	Sally Malik	Main role
2012	Flashpoint	Rebecca Vaughan	Episode: "Eyes In"
2014	Kingdom	Tatiana	3 episodes
2015–2016	New Girl	May	Recurring role (seasons 4–5), 5 episodes
2015	Banshee	Aimee King	Recurring role (season 3), 5 episodes
2015	Secrets and Lies	Nicole Mullen	Recurring role, 5 episodes
2015	Motive	Ella Rollins	Episode: "The Suicide Tree"
2016	Cooper Barrett's Guide to Surviving Life	Kelly Bishop	Main role
2017	Rogue	Clea Annou	Main role (season 4)
2017–2020	Hawaii Five-0	Tani Rey	Main role (seasons 8–10)
2018	Schitt's Creek	Klair	Episode: "Baby Sprinkle"
2020	Magnum P.I.	Tani Rey	Episode: "Desperate Measures"
2020	Supergirl	Female Brainiac 5	2 episodes
2020	Jury Duty	Jen	Main role (Pilot)
2022–2025	Children Ruin Everything	Astrid	Main role
2023	Accused	Morgan Knight	Episode: "Morgan's Story"
2023	How I Met Your Father	Parker	3 episodes
2026–present	The Audacity	Anushka Bhattachera-Phister	Main role

== Awards and nominations ==
Year	Award	Category	Title	Result	Ref.
2015	Golden Maple Award	Newcomer of the Year in a TV Series Broadcast in the U.S.	New Girl	Won	
2017	Leo Award	Best Lead Performance by a Female in a Dramatic Series	Rogue	Nominated	
