= Propaganda: The Art of Selling Lies =

2019 Canadian documentary film

- Film poster
- Directed by: Larry Weinstein
- Written by: David Mortin; Andrew Edmonds
- Produced by: Aeschylus Poulos; Bernd Wilting; Sonya Di Rienzo; Matthias von der Heide
- Cinematography: John Minh Tran
- Edited by: David New
- Music by: Raffael Seyfried; Andreas Schafer
- Production companies: Hawkeye Pictures; Taglicht Media
- Release date: April 28, 2019 (Hot Docs)
- Running time: 92 minutes
- Country: Canada
- Language: English

Propaganda: The Art of Selling Lies is a 2019 Canadian documentary film, directed by Larry Weinstein. The film examines the nature and history of propaganda, particularly the use of visual art to promote both positive and negative social messaging.

The film premiered at the 2019 Hot Docs Canadian International Documentary Festival. As of October 2021, 83% of the six critical reviews compiled on Rotten Tomatoes are positive, with an average rating of 6.8/10. David New received a Canadian Screen Award nomination for Best Editing in a Documentary at the 8th Canadian Screen Awards in 2020.
