= Gayle Ye =

Gayle Ye is an Emmy Award winning Canadian cinematographer, best known for their work on the films You Can Live Forever and Paying for It.

Their work has also included the television series Late Bloomer, Odd Squad, and Bria Mack Gets a Life. She is of Chinese descent, and is queer.

== Awards ==
Award	Year	Category	Work	Result	Ref.
Canadian Screen Awards	2023	Best Photography in a Comedy Series	Detention Adventure: "Singing in the Raign"	Nominated	
Canadian Screen Awards	2025	Best Photography in a Comedy Series	Late Bloomer: "Nudes"	Won	
Canadian Screen Awards	2025	Best Cinematography	Paying for It	Won	
Daytime Emmy Awards	2021	Outstanding Lighting Design	Odd Squad	Won	
