= Mouthpiece (film) =

- Film poster
- Directed by: Patricia Rozema
- Written by: Patricia Rozema; Amy Nostbakken; Norah Sadava
- Produced by: Christina Piovesan; Jennifer Shin
- Starring: Amy Nostbakken; Norah Sadava
- Cinematography: Catherine Lutes
- Edited by: Lara Johnston
- Music by: Amy Nostbakken
- Production company: First Generation Films
- Release date: September 6, 2018 (TIFF)
- Running time: 91 minutes
- Country: Canada
- Language: English

Mouthpiece is a 2018 Canadian drama film directed by Patricia Rozema, from a screenplay by Rozema, Amy Nostbakken and Norah Sadava, and based on the theatrical play by Nostbakken and Sadava. The film centres on Cassandra, a woman who is making arrangements for her mother's funeral. Cassandra is played by both Nostbakken and Sadava, as a dramatization of her inner conflict.

It premiered at the 2018 Toronto International Film Festival.

== Plot ==
A young writer, Cassandra, struggles to write a eulogy for her late mother, Elaine, who gave up her career to raise her children.

== Cast ==
- Amy Nostbakken as Cassandra
- Norah Sadava as Cassandra
- Maev Beaty as Elaine
- Jess Salgueiro as Roxanne
- Jake Epstein as Danny
- Ari Cohen as Dad
- Bruce Hunter as Uncle Jake
- Sharon Lewis as Barbara
- Jennifer Podemski as Mrs. Cappo
- Ishan Davé as Ex-Boyfriend

== Reception ==
On review aggregator website Rotten Tomatoes, the film holds an approval rating of 91% based on 32 reviews, and an average rating of 7.7/10. The site's critical consensus reads, "Mouthpiece interrogates gender norms with wit and ingenuity, portraying its main character's inner conflict through a pair of separate performances."

Glenn Sumi of Now gave the film a 4/5 rating, writing, "[Patricia] Rozema's version of Amy Nostbakken and Norah Sadava's award-winning stage play does more than just open the work up; it fills in key bits of information, shows us Cassandra out and about in Toronto and gives everything an affecting emotional resonance." Scott Tobias of Variety called it "a thoughtful interrogation of modern womanhood, leavened by gallows humor." Pamela Hutchinson of Sight & Sound wrote: "While the script's cleverness and wordplay betray its stage origins, it's bracingly sharp, and explicitly a feminist text."

In December 2018, the Toronto International Film Festival named the film to its annual year-end Canada's Top Ten list.
