= The Players (2025 film) =

2025 Canadian drama film

- Directed by: Sarah Galea-Davis
- Written by: Sarah Galea-Davis
- Produced by: Sonya Di Rienzo; Aeschylus Poulos
- Starring: Stefani Kimber; Eric Johnson
- Cinematography: Sara Mishara
- Edited by: Shaun Rykiss; Craig Scorgie
- Production company: Hawkeye Pictures
- Release date: March 6, 2025 (Glasgow)
- Running time: 94 minutes
- Country: Canada
- Language: English

The Players is a Canadian drama film, directed by Sarah Galea-Davis and released in 2025. The film stars Stefani Kimber as Emily, a teenage aspiring actress who gets cast in an avant-garde theatrical production of Hamlet, but who begins to realize that she might be in over her head when it comes to the controlling and coercive behaviour of director Reinhardt (Eric Johnson).

The cast also includes Jess Salgueiro, Ryan Allen, Wayne Burns, Joe Cobden, Tess Degenstein, Vanessa Smythe, Ennis Esmer and Anand Rajaram in supporting roles.

The film, Galea-Davis's full-length directorial debut, was based in part on her own experiences joining a theatrical acting troupe as a teenager prior to becoming a filmmaker.

The film debuted at the 2025 Glasgow Film Festival, and had its Canadian premiere at the 2025 Canadian Film Festival.

== Awards ==
Award	Date of ceremony	Category	Work	Result	Ref.
ACTRA Toronto Awards	2025	Outstanding Performance, Female	Stefani Kimber	Won	
Canadian Film Festival	2025	DGC Ontario Best Director	Sarah Galea-Davis	Won	
