= Gimme Truth =

2026 Canadian documentary film

- Directed by: Simon Ennis; Brad Abrahams
- Written by: Simon Ennis; Brad Abrahams; Nick Taylor
- Produced by: John Galway; Aeschylus Poulos
- Starring: Arcturus Ra; Jon Ronson; Mikki Willis
- Cinematography: Brad Abrahams; Simon Ennis
- Edited by: Nick Taylor
- Music by: Kieran Adams; Joseph Shabason
- Production company: Hawkeye Pictures
- Release date: April 25, 2026 (Hot Docs)
- Running time: 89 minutes
- Country: Canada
- Language: English

Gimme Truth is a Canadian documentary film, directed by Simon Ennis and Brad Abrahams and released in 2026. The film explores the prominence of conspiracy theories in contemporary culture.

The film premiered at the 2026 Hot Docs Canadian International Documentary Festival.

== Critical response ==
For ScreenFish, Steve Norton wrote that the film "isn’t propaganda of any stretch. Instead, Truth feels more like an investigation into how people come to invest their lives into wild movements and online rumour-mongering. Rather than portray his subjects as monsters, Ennis views every person with empathy. We might not agree with their beliefs but Truth wants us to see that they’re still human beings who are searching for answers. (And, without giving spoilers, some of these people do change their vews.)"

For Point of View, Victor Stiff wrote that "topic like the erosion of societal norms could easily feel stressful and dour in other filmmakers’ hands, but Abrahams and Ennis approach the subject matter with an enjoyably light touch. They find humour in the absurdity of events like the Conscious Life Expo, without punching down at the communities participating. Instead of shooting holes in the interviewees’ questionable logic, they opt to hang back, quietly observe, and let viewers make their own judgments."
