= QAA Podcast =

Investigative journalism podcast about QAnon

QAnon Anonymous
- Genre: News, investigative journalism
- Country of origin: United States, United Kingdom, Canada
- Language: English

Cast and voices
- Hosted by: Travis View, Julian Feeld, Jake Rockatansky, Annie Kelly, Liv Agar, Brad Abrahams

Production
- Length: 40-100 minutes

Publication
- No. of episodes: 634 (309 Main, 275 Premium, 50 Miniseries)
- Original release: 11 August 2018 – Ongoing

Related
- Website: www.qanonanonymous.com

The QAA Podcast (formerly QAnon Anonymous) is an investigative journalism podcast that analyzes and debunks conspiracy theories. It is co-hosted by Travis View (real name: Logan Strain), Julian Feeld, and Jake Rockatansky, alongside Annie Kelly (British correspondent), Liv Agar (Canadian correspondent), Brad Abrahams (Inner Earth correspondent), and Allie Mezei (QAA Legal Analyst).

== History ==
The podcast premiered in August 2018, around 10 months after the first posts made by the person claiming to be 'Q' on the 4chan message board. NPR called QAA "a podcast that tracks and debunks online conspiracy theories", initially focusing on the QAnon conspiracy theory but has since widened to discuss related conspiracy theories in general and the history of conspiratorial and reactionary thinking in other time periods.

On April 11, 2024, the podcast officially rebranded from QAnon Anonymous to simply the QAA Podcast, along with a new theme song and cover art.

The members of QAA have attended various QAnon live events, including the first ever QAnon conference, as well as events relating to other subjects of their journalism.

QAA describes QAnon as a "big tent conspiracy theory" and a "meta conspiracy theory that provides an underlying narrative for other baseless theories".

=== Hosts and correspondents ===
Travis View has written extensively for the Washington Post on the subject of QAnon. The podcast's hosts and correspondents, and View in particular, have been quoted and interviewed extensively by media covering the QAnon phenomenon, including Salon, Vice, BBC, Yahoo, the Atlantic Council, USA Today, and the Southern Poverty Law Center (SPLC).

Julian Feeld has told Wired that QAnon is "a colorful expression of a broader and more worrying global trend towards 'information warfare' in the service of those seeking to consolidate capital and power".

Annie Kelly acts as the podcast's United Kingdom correspondent and joined the podcast as the conspiracy theory spread from the United States to other countries, such as when it was accelerated by the COVID-19 pandemic.

Liv Agar has covered conspiracy theories focused on Canada, as well as topics relating to modern-day adolescent internet culture. Brad Abrahams was a documentary filmmaker working on projects relating to new age conspiracies when he joined the podcast as an occasional host.

=== Miniseries ===
A number of limited miniseries have been produced by various members of QAA. Trickle Down, hosted by View, discusses the historical dispensation of bad ideas and their results. ManClan, by Feeld and Kelly, is a deep dive into the emerging online manosphere and its various figures. The Spectral Voyager, courtesy of Rockatansky and Abrahams, talks about aliens and related subcultures. Perverts, hosted by Feeld and Agar, is an exploration of "horny" online communities.

== Reception ==
The Washington Post named QAnon Anonymous as their Podcast of the Year for 2020.

QAnon Anonymous has collaborated with a number of other podcasts, including Knowledge Fight, Boontavista, and the Conspirituality Podcast.
