= Jess Salgueiro =

Canadian actress (born 1987)

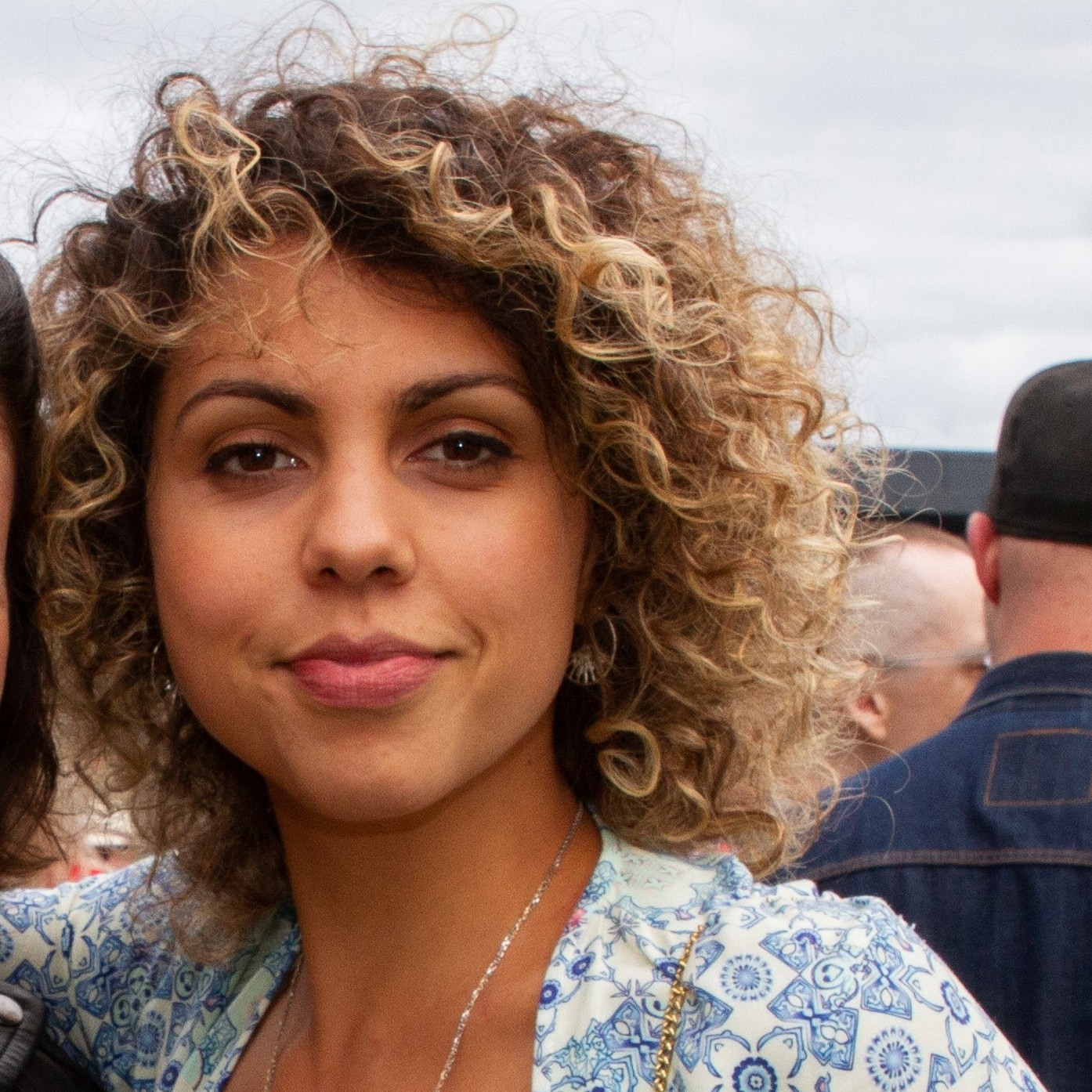
- Salgueiro in September 2019
- Born: November 19, 1987 (age 38); Winnipeg, Manitoba, Canada
- Education: Randolph Academy for the Performing Arts

Jess Salgueiro (born November 19, 1987) is a Canadian actress, known for her roles in Frasier, The Boys, Workin' Moms, The Expanse, Letterkenny, Orphan Black, Tiny Pretty Things, and the Fox series Doc.

As well as having a recurring role in season four of The Expanse, she also appeared in the Netflix comic book adaptation of Jupiter's Legacy, based on the comic book by Mark Millar and Frank Quitely.

Salgueiro was selected as a "rising star" at the 2018 Toronto International Film Festival for her role in Mouthpiece.

She starred in the 2019 comedy film Canadian Strain.

In 2023, she was cast as Eve in the Paramount+ revival of the classic sitcom Frasier.

== Personal life ==
Salgueiro was born in Winnipeg, Manitoba and attended Randolph Academy for the Performing Arts in Toronto, Ontario. Her parents are Portuguese Canadians; her father and mother emigrated from Alcanena and Santa Bárbara de Nexe, respectively. She resides in Toronto.

== Filmography ==
Film roles
| Year | Title | Role | Notes |
|---|---|---|---|
| 2011 | The Unleashed | Lindsay | |
| 2011 | Night Express | | |
| 2016 | A Sunday Kind of Love | Amy | |
| 2016 | The Market | Fatima | |
| 2017 | Mary Goes Round | Crystal | |
| 2018 | Mouthpiece | Roxanne | |
| 2018 | I'll Take Your Dead | Jackie | |
| 2019 | American Hangman | Darnley | |
| 2019 | Canadian Strain | Anne Banting | |
| 2020 | Bing! Bang! Bi! | Cala | |
| 2020 | Little Bird | Olivia | |
| 2020 | Sugar Daddy | Angela | |
| 2021 | Dark Web: Cicada 3301 | Shauna | |
| 2021 | Drifting Snow | Jess | |
| 2023 | Who's Yer Father? | Junior | |
| 2025 | Racewalkers | Allison | |
| 2025 | The Players | Marley | |
| 2026 | Ancestral Beasts | Dr. Patrick | |

Television roles
| Year | Title | Role | Notes |
|---|---|---|---|
| 2014–2017 | The Strain | Sherry | Guest (season 1); recurring role (season 4); 4 episodes |
| 2014 | Remedy | Meredith | Episode: "Bad Blood" |
| 2015–2017 | Saving Hope | Nurse Cabrera | Recurring role; 11 episodes |
| 2015–2017 | Man Seeking Woman | DJ | Episode: "Pitbull" |
| 2015–2017 | Orphan Black | Luisa | 2 episodes |
| 2016 | Beauty & the Beast | Patsy | Episode: "Something's Gotta Give" |
| 2016 | Private Eyes | Charmaine | Episode: "The Six" |
| 2016 | Seraphim | | Episode: Pilot |
| 2016 | Serialized | Kane | TV movie |
| 2016 | In Real Life: The Series | Nancy | Episode: "Stardom" |
| 2017 | Ransom | Marisol | Episode: "Joe" |
| 2017 | The Bold Type | Cassie | Episode: "The End of the Beginning" |
| 2017 | Channel Zero | Lacey | Recurring role; 4 episodes |
| 2017 | Kim's Convenience | Elena | Episode: "Sneak Attack" |
| 2017–2018 | Mary Kills People | Larissa | Recurring role; 4 episodes |
| 2017–2019 | Workin' Moms | Mean Nanny / Renya | Recurring role; 11 episodes |
| 2018 | Condor | Jada | 2 episodes |
| 2018 | No Sleep 'Til Christmas | Gemma | TV movie |
| 2018–2019 | Letterkenny | Mary-Anne | Recurring role; 7 episodes |
| 2019 | The Ninth | Jessica 'Messy Jessie' Tapp | Main role; 8 episodes |
| 2019 | The Boys | Robin Ward | Recurring role; 4 episodes |
| 2019 | Carter | Portia Quintano | Episode: "Harley Wanted To Say Bonspiel" |
| 2019 | The Expanse | Chandra Wei | Recurring role; 10 episodes |
| 2020 | Tiny Pretty Things | Isabel | Main role |
| 2021 | Jupiter's Legacy | Jacinda Dos Santos / Shockwave | Recurring role |
| 2021 | Y: The Last Man | Christine Flores | Recurring role |
| 2023–2024 | Frasier | Eve | Main role; 20 episodes |
| 2023 | Monarch: Legacy of Monsters | Barnes | Recurring role; 3 episodes |
| 2026 | Slo Pitch | Joanne | Main role |

Video game roles
| Year | Title | Role | Notes |
|---|---|---|---|
| 2021 | Far Cry 6 | Clara Garcia | |
| 2023 | Avatar: Frontiers of Pandora | | |
