= Can You Wave Bye-Bye? =

2007 Canadian short film

- Directed by: Sarah Galea-Davis
- Written by: Sarah Galea-Davis
- Based on: "Can You Wave Bye-Bye, Baby?" by Elyse Gasco
- Produced by: Paul Barbeau
- Starring: Miranda Handford
- Cinematography: Nicolas Bolduc
- Edited by: Stephen Philipson
- Production company: NuFilms
- Distributed by: Ouat Media
- Release date: September 13, 2007 (TIFF)
- Running time: 16 minutes
- Country: Canada
- Language: English

Can You Wave Bye-Bye? is a Canadian short drama film, directed by Sarah Galea-Davis and released in 2007. An adaptation of the short story by Elyse Gasco, the film stars Miranda Handford as a young new mother suffering from post-partum depression.

The film premiered at the 2007 Toronto International Film Festival. It was subsequently screened at the CFC Worldwide Short Film Festival in 2008, where it won the award for Best Canadian Short Film. It was a Genie Award nominee for Best Live Action Short Drama at the 29th Genie Awards, and a Prix Jutra nominee for Best Short Film at the 10th Jutra Awards.
