= Thom Allison =

Canadian actor

- Born: Winnipeg, Manitoba
- Education: Ryerson Theatre School
- Occupation: Actor · singer · director
- Years active: 1990s–present

Thom Allison is a Canadian actor. He is best known for his regular recurring role as Pree in the television series Killjoys, for which he won the Canadian Screen Award for Best Supporting Actor in a Drama Series at the 8th Canadian Screen Awards.

== Biography ==
Allison was born and raised in Winnipeg, Manitoba as the son of a Black Nova Scotian father and a Mennonite mother.

== Education and career ==
Allison graduated from the acting program offered at Ryerson Theatre School . Beginning his career in the early 1990s, Allison eventually went on to act for film, television and theatre alike.

Primarily a stage actor, he first attained prominence for his performance as Robin Turner in Canadian Stage's 2000 stage adaptation of Outrageous!, for which he received a Dora Mavor Moore Award nomination for Outstanding Performance by a Male in a Principal Role – Musical in 2001. He has also frequently appeared in productions at the Shaw Festival and the Stratford Festival, and in touring productions of Rent and Priscilla, Queen of the Desert, and appeared as drag queen Therese in the first episode of Kim's Convenience.

In 2003, Allison produced a solo CD A Whole Lotta Sunlight covering famous songs including "Moon River" and "Somewhere Over the Rainbow".

In 2019, Allison and Micah Barnes collaborated on Knishes 'n Grits, a stage show in which they explored the links between Jewish music and African American music.

== Filmography ==
=== Film ===
Year	Title	Role	Notes
2002	Leaving Metropolis	Shannon	Film Debut Role
2003	One Last Dance	Babysitter	
2008	Repo! The Genetic Opera	Gossip Journalist	
2017	Miss Odette's Modern Handbook to Manners	Ian	Short Film
2018	22 Chaser	Teeny	
2019	Canadian Strain	Gary	
2022	Junior's Giant	Leo	
2023	Queen Tut		

=== Television ===
Year	Title	Role	Notes
2006	The Road to Christmas	Michele	TV movie
2006	Why I Wore Lipstick to My Mastectomy	Queen from Queens	TV movie
2007	I Me Wed	Bill	TV movie
2015–2019	Killjoys	Pree	Recurring Role; 39 Episodes; Won Canadian Screen Award for Best Supporting Actor in a Drama Series
2016	Private Eyes	Gil Schmit	1 Episode
2016	Kim's Convenience	Therese	1 Episode
2016	Murdoch Mysteries	Oscar Ducharme	1 Episode
2017	Odd Squad	Chef	1 Episode
2017	Your All Time Classic Hit Parade		5 Episodes
2021	Frankie Drake Mysteries	Roger LeBlanc	1 Episode
2021	Canada's Drag Race	Guest mentor	1 Episode
2022–present	Pinecone & Pony	Greymoon (voice)	Recurring Role; 8 Episodes
2022–present	Coroner	Dr. Elijah Thompson	Main Role; 10 Episodes
2023	Slasher	Georges Rondeau	Main Role; 8 Episodes

== Stage ==
Year	Title	Role	Location	Notes	Reference
1993–1995	Miss Saigon	Ensemble	The Princess of Wales Theatre	Mirvish Productions National Premiere	
1995	The Who's Tommy	Hawker Ensemble	Elgin Theatre	Mirvish Productions National Premiere	
2002	My Fair Lady	Costermonger	Festival Theatre	Stratford Festival of Canada	
2002	The Threepenny Opera	Street Singer Crookfinger Jake	Avon Theatre	Stratford Festival of Canada	
2003	Evita	Che	Max Bell Theatre	Theatre Calgary	
2003	The King and I	The Kralahome	Festival Theatre	Stratford Festival of Canada	
2003	The Adventures of Pericles	Lord Gentleman	Festival Theatre	Stratford Festival of Canada	
2004	Macbeth	Donalbain	Festival Theatre	Stratford Festival of Canada	
2004	King Henry VIII (All is True)	Duke of Suffolk	Festival Theatre	Stratford Festival of Canada	
2005	Take Me Out	Darren Lemming	Bluma Appel	CanStage	
2005	Into the Woods	The Wolf Cinderella's Prince	Avon Theatre	Stratford Festival of Canada	
2005	Hello, Dolly!	Rudolph Reisenweber	Festival Theatre	Stratford Festival of Canada	
2007	Elegies: A Song Cycle		Berkeley Street Theatre Upstairs	Acting Up Stage Theatre Company	
2008	Wonderful Town	Chick Clark	Festival Theatre	Shaw Festival	
2009	A New Brain	Roger Delli-Bovi	Berkeley Street Theatre Upstairs	Acting Up Stage Theatre Company	
	The Drowsy Chaperone	Aldopho	Shoctor Theare	Citadel Theatre	
2011	Priscilla Queen of the Desert the Musical		The Princess of Wales Theatre		
2011–2012	Priscilla Queen of the Desert the Musical	Ensemble Understudy for Bernadette, Miss Understanding, Jimmy	Palace Theatre	Broadway	
2012	Ragtime	Coalhouse Walker Jr.	Festival Theatre	Shaw Festival	
2012	His Girl Friday	Diamond Louie	Festival Theatre	Shaw Festival	
2014	Elegies: A Song Cycle		Daniels Spectrum Aki Studio Theatre	Acting Up Stage Theatre Company	
2020	The Louder We Get	Lonnie Wynn	Max Bell Theatre	Theatre Calgary	

== Awards and nominations ==
Allison won the Canadian Screen Award for Best Supporting Actor in a Drama Series for his role as Pree in the television series Killjoys. He was also the recipient of two Tyrone Guthrie Awards presented by the Stratford Festival Company.

Over the course of his career, Allison was nominated for various Canadian Theatre Awards including three Dora awards, two Bettys, two Jessies, an Ovation, and a Sterling.
