= Paying for It (film) =

2024 Canadian drama film

- Film poster
- Directed by: Sook-Yin Lee
- Written by: Sook-Yin Lee; Joanne Sarazen
- Based on: Paying for It by Chester Brown
- Produced by: Matt Code; Sonya Di Rienzo; Aeschylus Poulos
- Starring: Dan Beirne; Emily Lê; Andrea Werhun
- Cinematography: Gayle Ye
- Edited by: Anna Catley
- Music by: Sook-Yin Lee; Dylan Gamble
- Production companies: Wildling Pictures; Hawkeye Pictures
- Distributed by: Loco Films
- Release date: September 6, 2024 (TIFF)
- Country: Canada
- Language: English
- Box office: $12,276

Paying for It is a 2024 Canadian drama film, directed by Sook-Yin Lee. It is an adaptation of Chester Brown's graphic memoir Paying for It, about his decision to start frequenting sex workers after the breakup of his real-life relationship with Lee. The film stars Dan Beirne as Brown and Emily Lê as Sonny, with Andrea Werhun, Kaitlyn Chalmers-Rizzato, Stephen Kalyn, Chris Sandiford, Kris Siddiqi, Sera-Lys McArthur and Rodrigo Fernandez-Stoll in supporting roles.

== Plot ==
Chester and Sonny's relationship begins with tension when Sonny admits she is falling in love with someone else. Chester, though hurt, responds with compassion and tells her that he still loves her. Instead of breaking apart, they negotiate the idea of openness in their relationship, testing the boundaries of love, trust, and jealousy. Chester seeks to understand rather than control, though both wrestle with insecurity and shifting expectations.

As their lives branch out, Chester begins exploring intimacy through paid encounters, treating them almost as research into connection. Along the way, he shares moments of tenderness with sex workers like Anne, Amanda, and later Denise (Yulissa), blurring the line between transactional and personal intimacy. These encounters challenge his ideas about love and romantic obligation, pushing him toward a belief in autonomy and honesty over possessiveness. Meanwhile, Sonny explores new partners and relationships, but their paths keep crossing with unfinished affection and loyalty.

Over time, Chester forms a lasting bond with Denise, choosing a stable arrangement that merges companionship and paid intimacy, rejecting traditional romantic ideals but finding real devotion nonetheless. Sonny moves on with her own life, but the affection between them never disappears. In the end, Chester and Denise remain monogamous for decades, showing that their unconventional beginnings led to an enduring commitment built not on traditional romance, but on choice, mutual respect, and truth.

== Production ==
Production on the film was first announced in 2022. In contrast to the original graphic novel, which used artistic techniques to obscure the faces of the sex workers due to Brown's concern for the women's privacy rights but faced some criticism for seemingly dehumanizing them, Lee's film adaptation, through a "female gaze", more strongly centres the women's own perspectives.

Although Lee herself is a character in the original graphic novel, for the film adaptation she chose to rename her character Sonny to give herself some creative distance from the material.

== Distribution ==
The film premiered in the Platform Prize program at the 2024 Toronto International Film Festival. In conjunction with the film premiere, Drawn & Quarterly reissued a new "film edition" of the graphic novel, with a foreword by Lee and special bonus material about the film production.

It has been picked up for international distribution by Loco Films.

== Reception ==
=== Critical response ===
On the review aggregator website Rotten Tomatoes, 86% of 21 critics' reviews are positive, with an average rating of 7.8/10. Metacritic, which uses a weighted average, assigned the film a score of 82 out of 100, based on four critics, indicating "universal acclaim".

Alex Hudson of Exclaim! rated the film 8 out of 10, writing that "even though this story is being told by the people it happened to, it's not overly flattering to its subjects. Chester's transactional approach to sex brings out his superficiality, and when he tells his friends about how great it is, he rarely expresses much overt happiness, often seeming as much like he's trying to convince himself as anyone else. And Sonny is judgmental and fickle, steering their lives into one unsustainable situation after another. They're flawed while remaining likeable and relatable."

After the conclusion of the festival, Hudson and colleague Rachel Ho identified the film as one of its overall highlights, writing that "Toronto cartoonist Chester Brown decided to hire sex workers after a bad breakup with ex-girlfriend Sook-Yin Lee—at which point he made the surprising decision to publicly write about it in a graphic novel. Even more surprising is that Lee is the one to adapt that story for the screen. Come for the intensely intimate tell-all, stay for the fun '90s Toronto references."

Courtney Small of That Shelf wrote that "wrapping all the various connections in a simple but effective aesthetic, Lee's film truly feels like a graphic novel come to life. One could easily see the film playing in a double bill alongside Terry Zwigoff's Ghost World or even, to a certain extent, Kevin Smith's Chasing Amy, which also involves a cartoonist who finds himself in a complicated relationship. Make no mistake though, Lee crafts a film that stands firmly on its own richly constructed merits. Whether finding humour in each new encounter Chester has with a sex worker, or observing the sparks that ignite Sonny's passion for her new lovers, each section of the film feels fully realized."

== Accolades ==
The film was named to TIFF's annual Canada's Top Ten list for 2024.

Award	Year	Category	Recipient	Result	Ref.
Canadian Screen Awards	2025	Best Lead Performance in a Comedy Film	Emily Lê	Nominated	
Canadian Screen Awards	2025	Best Adapted Screenplay	Sook-Yin Lee, Joanne Sarazen	Won	
Canadian Screen Awards	2025	Best Cinematography	Gayle Ye	Won	
Canadian Screen Awards	2025	Best Editing	Anna Catley	Nominated	
Canadian Screen Awards	2025	Best Casting in a Film	Jenny Lewis, Sara Kay, Kalene Osborne	Nominated	
