= David New =

Canadian film editor

David New is a Canadian film editor.

New won a Gemini Award for "Best Editing in a Comedy, Variety or Performing Arts Program or Series" in 1997 for his work on September Songs –The Music of Kurt Weill and won the award again in 2002 for his work on Ravel’s Brain. New is a five-time Gemini Award nominee.

== Awards and nominations ==
Year	Association	Category	Nominated work	Result
1997	Gemini Awards	Best Picture Editing in a Comedy, Variety or Performing Arts Program or Series	September Songs: The Music of Kurt Weill (1994)	Won
2001	Gemini Awards	Best Direction in a Variety or Performing Arts Program or Series	Dinner at the Edge (2000)	Nominated
2002	Gemini Awards	Best Picture Editing in a Comedy, Variety or Performing Arts Program or Series	Ravel's Brain (2001)	Won
2005	Gemini Awards	Best Picture Editing in a Comedy, Variety or Performing Arts Program or Series	Beethoven's Hair (2005)	Nominated
2006	Gemini Awards	Best Picture Editing in a Comedy, Variety or Performing Arts Program or Series	Burnt Toast (2005)	Nominated
2011	International Documentary Association	Best Limited Series (shared)	The National Parks Project (2011)	Nominated
2020	Canadian Screen Awards	Best Editing in a Feature Length Documentary	Propaganda: The Art of Selling Lies (2019)	Nominated
