= Cooper Barrett's Guide to Surviving Life =

American television series

- Genre: Sitcom
- Created by: Jay Lacopo
- Starring: Jack Cutmore-Scott; Meaghan Rath; James Earl; Charlie Saxton; Liza Lapira; Justin Bartha
- Composer: Jeff Cardoni
- Country of origin: United States
- Original language: English
- No. of seasons: 1
- No. of episodes: 13

Production
- Executive producers: Gail Berman; Bill Callahan; Jay Lacopo; James Griffiths
- Editor: Keith Croket
- Camera setup: Single-camera
- Running time: 21 minutes
- Production companies: Lansdowne Productions; Big Time Show Biz Entertainment; The Jackal Group; 20th Century Fox Television

Original release
- Network: Fox
- Release: January 3 – June 26, 2016

Cooper Barrett's Guide to Surviving Life (originally announced as The Guide to Surviving Life before reverting to its original working title) is an American television sitcom created by Jay Lacopo. It debuted online on December 21, 2015, and made its television premiere on January 3, 2016, on Fox, with 13 episodes ordered. The series follows Cooper Barrett (Jack Cutmore-Scott) and his friends and family while exploring what we all go through on our way to figuring out what life is all about. On May 12, 2016, Fox cancelled the series, leaving three episodes unaired. The network burned off two of the unaired episodes on June 12, 2016, with the last one airing on June 26, 2016.

== Cast ==
=== Main ===
- Jack Cutmore-Scott as Cooper Barrett
- Meaghan Rath as Kelly Bishop, a neighbor of Cooper who steals his heart.
- James Earl as Barry Sandel, a roommate of Cooper who can't stay out of trouble.
- Charlie Saxton as Neal Fissley, a roommate of Cooper who seems to fail at love.
- Liza Lapira as Leslie Barrett, Cooper's sister-in-law, Josh's wife, and mother to Gracie.
- Justin Bartha as Josh Barrett, Cooper's older brother, Leslie's husband, and father to Gracie.

=== Recurring ===
- Marshall Manesh as Virgil, the landlord
- Victoria Justice as Ramona Miller, a corporate shark who befriends Kelly.

=== Guest stars ===
- Paula Abdul as a hallucination of herself
- Colin Cowherd as himself
- Kimberly Kevon Williams as Ashley, Barry's girlfriend.
- Corey Reynolds as Frank, Ashley's father.
- Lyndon Smith as Lena, one of Cooper's ex-girlfriends who finds a way back in his life.
- Parker Young as Shane, an extremely competitive guy who briefly dates Kelly.
- Alan Ruck and Jane Kaczmarek as Mark and Cindy Barrett, Cooper and Josh's parents.
- Juicy J as himself

== Episodes ==
No.	Title	Directed by	Written by	Original release date	Prod. code	US viewers (millions)
1	"How to Survive Your Loveable Jackass"	James Griffiths	Jay Lacopo	December 21, 2015 (online); January 3, 2016 (broadcast)	1AYT01	2.62
In 2011, Cooper, Barry, and Neal move into their new apartment and have a wild housewarming party, during which their new TV is stolen. Two years later, Barry steals "back" the wrong TV from the UFC guys. At a basketball game, Cooper is recognized by the UFC guys and kidnapped, so his friends have to bail him out. His relationship with his neighbor Kelly is difficult. Finally, Cooper quits his job because he has found investors for his idea.
2	"How to Survive Insufficient Funds"	James Griffiths	Paul Mather	January 10, 2016	1AYT04	4.57
The roommates run out of money and they fail to create income by selling their hangover cure, so they participate at a drug trial. As a side effect, they hallucinate and get robbed for their new cash. Then they break into a bank and hang their giant product banner from the building. Meanwhile, an awkward misunderstanding happens between Kelly, Josh and Leslie.
3	"How to Survive Being a Plus One"	James Griffiths	Amelie Gillette	January 17, 2016	1AYT06	2.56
Kelly is invited to Mexico for the wedding of her ex-boyfriend Thom (Jayson Blair) and brings Cooper as her plus one. The trip proves to be difficult and requires the help of Josh and the roommates. In the end, the wedding is cancelled, and Kelly learns that Cooper is a great friend.
4	"How to Survive Losing Your Phone"	Jeff Melman	Brian Rubenstein	February 14, 2016	1AYT05	1.74
Cooper loses his cell phone, and Barry, Josh and Neal help him get it back. Meanwhile, Kelly and Leslie have some karaoke fun at the bar, but when Kelly hits on guy who already has a girlfriend, an all out brawl erupts.
5	"How to Survive Your Roommate's Girlfriend"	Adam Davidson	Bill Callahan & Paul Mather	February 21, 2016	1AYT08	1.87
Barry's new girlfriend Ashley (Kimberly Kevon Williams) turns out to be rich, with Ashley's father Frank (Corey Reynolds) giving Barry a job. Barry then learns that Frank's business isn't all that legitimate.
6	"How to Survive Your Horrible Landlord"	James Griffiths	Donald Diego	March 6, 2016	1AYT07	1.85
A tree crashes into the guys' apartment, but their landlord, Virgil, refuses to do anything about it until they get rid of their pig James Franco. The situation also puts a damper on where Cooper and Kelly stand romantically, having only kissed once, despite continuing sexual tension since.
7	"How to Survive Old Friends"	James Griffiths	Jay Lacopo	March 13, 2016	1AYT02	1.95
Cameron Rash (Adam Hagenbuch), the guys' old college classmate visits, severely interrupting everyone's lives with his carefree slacker ways.
8	"How to Survive Your Crazy Ex"	Jeremy Garelick	Bill Callahan	April 3, 2016	1AYT03	0.97
Cooper's ex-girlfriend Lena (Lyndon Smith), now an abstract artist, displays a photo of Cooper's penis at her art exhibit. Cooper then asks Neal, who is dealing with his ex-girlfriend dating a new guy, to convince Lena to get rid of all the other remaining copies of the photo. Neal and Lena then begin dating, making Cooper somewhat jealous. Kelly begins dating Shane (Parker Young), a guy she met at her spin class, whose overly-competitiveness becomes a turn off for her. Josh becomes bothered that Barry and Leslie encourage each other to embrace their different interests, even though Josh wants to keep his time with Cooper and friends, and his time at home with Leslie separate.
9	"How to Survive Working with Friends"	Bill Purple	Brian Rubenstein	April 10, 2016	1AYT09	1.09
Kelly befriends Ramona Miller (Victoria Justice), who turns out to have only used her to sabotage Cooper, Barry, and Neal's hangover cure business. Things are already in bad terms between the guys, after Cooper completely doesn't acknowledge Barry and Neal in a newspaper article when the hangover cure wins a major award. As a result, Barry and Neal begin working for Ramona's competing hangover cure business. Upon seeing Kelly being friends with Ramona, Leslie fears she has been replaced as Kelly's best friend.
10	"How to Survive Your Parents' Visit"	Henry Chan	Story by : Donald Diego; Teleplay by : John Blickstead & Trey Kollmer	April 17, 2016	1AYT10	1.04
Cooper and Josh's parents, Mark and Cindy (Alan Ruck and Jane Kaczmarek), visit to celebrate their 40th anniversary. Cooper and Josh then both compete to get the attention of Mark after finding out that he enjoys wild parties, despite previously putting on the facade that he is a strict and responsible person. Neal becomes addicted to pornography, so Barry forces him to overcome his habit for 48 hours. After previously walking in on Cindy using the bathroom years ago, Leslie becomes uncomfortable being alone with her.
11	"How to Survive Your Emotional Baggage"	Phil Traill	Bill Callahan & Paul Mather	June 12, 2016	1AYT12	0.80
Cooper, Barry and Neal try to make a deal with a beverage company owned by Tommy Hench (Max Adler), their brash former high school classmate to distribute their hangover cure. However, Neal has bad blood with Tommy, souring the possible deal. Kelly stays at Josh and Leslie's house while her apartment is being fumigated, and is told not to enter a secret room. Kelly goes into the secret room anyway and discovers that Leslie is an amateur painter and encourages her to continue with her passion, much to Josh's chagrin.
12	"How to Survive Dating"	Matt Sohn	Jay Lacopo	June 12, 2016	1AYT13	0.80
Cooper and Kelly refuse to acknowledge their romantic feelings for each other, so in the meantime they date other people. Cooper dates Hannah (Caitlin Harris), an environmentalist who is also homeless by choice and pushes her extreme liberal views on Cooper, while Kelly dates Steve (Geoff Pierson), a rich 60-something potential client of Josh's. Barry and Neal agree to both date Paige (Ashley Hinshaw), a polyamorous woman.
13	"How to Survive Your Birthday"	James Griffiths	Amelie Gillette	June 26, 2016	1AYT11	0.97
Cooper is relieved that no one is throwing him a big birthday party, believing his birthday to be cursed, but is still disappointed when no one but Ramona seems to remember it. Ramona starts to get romantic with Cooper as they enter his darkened apartment, only to have the lights come on and reveal a massive gathering for Cooper's surprise party. Kelly acts okay with Cooper and Ramona being involved, but is clearly not. Cooper finally reveals his true feelings for Kelly, but Ramona overhears, ending her and Cooper's business relationship. Meanwhile, Leslie tries to convince Josh that they should have another child.

== Broadcast ==
Initially being shown in a Sunday 8:30pm timeslot, it was moved to 7:30pm from the eighth episode onwards. After lasting three episodes there, the series was pulled, and returned in June for the remaining three episodes at 7pm, with the exception of the twelfth at 7:30pm.

The show was acquired for broadcast in a few international markets; Sweden in April 2016, Poland in May 2016, Italy in fall 2016 on Fox, Germany in January 2018, and later in the United Kingdom by FOX, set to air in May 2021, as part of a number of one-season US sitcoms imported to fill their schedule during the COVID-19 pandemic.

== Reception ==
The show has met an average response from critics. On Metacritic, it has a score of 51/100 based on 14 reviews. On Rotten Tomatoes, it has a score of 50% based on 19 reviews, with an average rating of 5.3/10. The critical consensus reads: "Cooper Barrett's Guide to Surviving Life wins points for earnestness and a slight progressive slant, but an overall lack of smarts or structure keeps the show from living up to its full potential."
