= Bad Match =

- Theatrical release poster
- Directed by: David Chirchirillo
- Screenplay by: David Chirchirillo
- Produced by: J.D. Lifshitz; Raphael Margules
- Starring: Jack Cutmore-Scott; Lili Simmons
- Cinematography: Ed Wu
- Edited by: Michael Block
- Music by: Amnon Freidlin; Brian McOmber
- Production companies: BoulderLight Pictures; mm2 Entertainment
- Distributed by: Orion Pictures; Gravitas Ventures
- Release date: November 3, 2017
- Running time: 83 minutes
- Country: United States
- Language: English
- Box office: $3,351

Bad Match is a 2017 American thriller film written and directed by David Chirchirillo. The film follows Harris, a man who prefers hooking up over actual relationships that meets a woman with an unpredictable temperament.

It was released in the United States on November 3, 2017 by Orion Pictures and Gravitas Ventures.

== Plot ==
Harris is an average man who regularly uses an online dating service to seduce women into hookups and then proceeds to ghost them the next morning. On one such date, he meets Riley Miller. When Harris attempts, as usual, to leave before Riley wakes up the next morning, she wakes and tries persistently to get him to stay longer. Harris eventually talks his way into leaving. During the course of the following day, Riley repeatedly texts Harris at work, much to his annoyance. That night, he initially attempts to complete a project for work, but invites Riley over after she sends a nude image. They once again have sex, and she stays the night. The next morning, Harris wakes to a phone call from his job informing him that he missed an important presentation. Riley mentions she accidentally silenced his alarms hours ago and apologizes. Harris, upset, leaves in a hurry, trusting Riley to see herself out.

At work, he manages to smooth things over with his boss Terri Webster, although she isn't pleased. As the day goes on, Riley continues to call and text Harris with apologies, although he ignores her. Upon returning home at the end of the day, Harris is shocked to discover Riley still in his apartment, cooking an apology dinner for him. He sends Riley home, but fails to express to her that he doesn't wish to see her again. He spends the rest of the night playing video games with a teenager online. Their trash-talk gets heated, causing the teenager to leave the game abruptly. Riley continues to call Harris throughout the night and he continues to ignore her. The next day, Harris hangs out with his friends at a bar. Eventually, Riley becomes the topic of conversation and Harris describes her as a lunatic who he slept with twice against his better judgement. Riley, who tracked Harris down via Facebook, overhears this, makes a scene, then storms out, indicating she doesn't want to see him again.

The next day, Riley repeatedly tries to get in contact with Harris, threatening suicide if Harris doesn't "rescue" her. Harris goes to Riley's apartment, finding her seemingly dead on the floor. However, she reveals it was a malicious prank. Harris is furious, shattering a mirror and storming out. The next day, Harris's boss informs him that his Twitter account was hacked, and he is fired as a result. The following day, the police arrest Harris after discovering child pornography on his computer that Harris was unaware of. Harris is convinced Riley is responsible for him getting fired and for downloading the child pornography onto his computer and realizes that a confession is likely the only way for him to avoid prison time. He goes to Riley's apartment, intending to get her to confess while recording their conversation. Riley apologizes for faking her suicide, but refuses to acknowledge hacking his Twitter account or downloading child pornography onto his computer. Harris, frustrated, gets violent, but leaves once Riley screams out for help. The following day, Riley files a restraining order against Harris.

Harris, still determined to get Riley to confess, lures her away from her friends with a fake Facebook account, drugs her, then kidnaps her. He tries to get her to confess at knifepoint and she agrees, although seems confused as to what she's supposed to confess to. She convinces Harris to untie her so she can reapply makeup, pointing out that no one will believe a confession video if she looks disheveled. Once Harris unties her, she attacks him, eventually gaining the upper hand and striking his head repeatedly with a golf club, apparently killing him. Riley leaves into the parking lot but can't find a way past the parking lot's locked gates. She turns around and is suddenly stabbed in the chest and killed by Harris, who seemingly survived her attack on him.

After Riley dies, Harris begins wondering why Riley refused to simply confess. He receives a call from his lawyer informing him that all charges have been dropped due to a confession by Keenan, the teenager from Harris's online video game whom he'd insulted. As Harris processes this, a security guard discovers Harris, his face revealed to be heavily damaged, and Riley's body and calls the police.

== Cast ==
- Jack Cutmore-Scott as Harris
- Lili Simmons as Riley Miller
- Brandon Scott as Chuck
- Chase Williamson as Robby
- Noureen DeWulf as Terri
- Max Haaga as Shadowman
- Kahyun Kim as Lydia
- Christine Donlon as Rachel
- Seth Morris as Ronald Dale
- Eric Podnar as Brett
- Trent Haaga as Officer Dean
- Cynthia Rose Hall as Officer Rich
- Clarissa van der Berg as Susan

== Release ==
The film was released on November 3, 2017.

== Reception ==
On Metacritic the movie holds a 56% among critics, indicating "mixed reviews". On Rotten Tomatoes the film holds a 100% among critics based on 8 reviews, with an average rating of 6.7/10. Owen Gleiberman of Variety said the film was "a toxic master of the digital hookup gets his comeuppance in a tawdry but watchable low-budget Fatal Attraction for the age of Tinder". John Defore of The Hollywood Reporter also compared the film to Fatal Attraction, saying it was a "nightmare of modern dating". Noel Murray said the film "unleashes a fatal attraction for the Tinder set".
