= Ben Lawrence (editor) =

Canadian film editor

Ben Lawrence is a Canadian film editor. He is most noted for his work on the 2021 documentary film My Tree, for which he won the award for Best Editing in a Documentary at the 10th Canadian Screen Awards in 2022.

His other credits have included the film Brown Girl Begins, episodes of the television series The Listener, Murdoch Mysteries and Frankie Drake Mysteries, and the web series Tokens and Inhuman Condition.
