= Sarah Galea-Davis =

Canadian filmmaker

Sarah Galea-Davis is a Canadian filmmaker and screenwriter based in Toronto, Ontario, whose debut feature film The Players premiered in 2025.

An alumna of the Canadian Film Centre, she previously directed a number of short films, most notably Can You Wave Bye-Bye? in 2007. She has also been a producer for other filmmakers, most notably the documentary films of Marc de Guerre.

The Players debuted at the 2025 Glasgow Film Festival, and had its Canadian premiere at the 2025 Canadian Film Festival. The film was based in part on her own experiences joining a theatrical acting troupe as a teenager prior to becoming a filmmaker.

== Filmography ==
- Berlin - 2005, writer and director
- I Made a Girlfriend - 2007, writer and director
- Can You Wave Bye-Bye? - 2007, writer and director
- The End of Men - 2011, producer
- Who's Sorry Now? - 2012, producer
- Why Men Cheat - 2012, producer
- Porch Stories - 2014, producer
- An Apartment - 2014, writer and director
- Safe at Home - 2020, co-director with Dave Derewlany
- The Players - 2025, writer and director

== Awards ==
Award	Date of ceremony	Category	Work	Result	Ref.
CFC Worldwide Short Film Festival	2008	Best Canadian Short Film	Can You Wave Bye-Bye?	Won	
Genie Awards	2009	Best Live Action Short Drama	Can You Wave Bye-Bye?	Nominated	
Prix Jutra	2008	Best Short Film	Can You Wave Bye-Bye?	Nominated	
Canadian Film Festival	2025	DGC Ontario Best Director	The Players	Won	
