= Aeschylus Poulos =

Canadian film producer

Aeschylus Poulos is a Canadian film producer. He is most noted as a producer of the films My Tree, which was a Canadian Screen Award nominee for Best Feature Length Documentary at the 10th Canadian Screen Awards in 2022, and Brother, which won the CSA for Best Motion Picture at the 11th Canadian Screen Awards in 2023.

Formerly associated with Foundry Films, where he was a producer or co-producer of films such as Inescapable, Picture Day and Molly Maxwell, he launched his own shingle, Hawkeye Pictures, in 2015 to executive produce Andrew Cividino's film Sleeping Giant. With Hawkeye, he has been a producer of 22 Chaser, Propaganda: The Art of Selling Lies, The Young Arsonists and The Players, and executive producer of Natasha, My 90-Year-Old Roommate, Mary Goes Round, Tito, The Long Rider, Queen Tut and Gimme Truth.

== Filmography ==
- Slings & Arrows - 2005-2006, associate producer
- Triple Sensation - 2007, associate producer
- Dinner at Lucy's - 2009, producer
- Unlocked - 2009, producer
- Fat Chance - 2009, producer
- The Translator - 2010, producer and director
- Big Moments in Little Films - 2010, producer
- The Day I Thought I Died - 2010, producer
- Happy Pills - 2010, producer
- Little Films About Big Moments - 2010, producer and director
- Teaching the Life of Music - 2011, line producer
- The Bastard Sings the Sweetest Song - 2012, associate producer
- Picture Day - 2012, producer
- Inescapable - 2012, co-producer
- Calcutta Taxi - 2012, producer
- 100 Musicians - 2012, executive producer
- Mad Ship - 2012, associate producer
- Molly Maxwell - 2013, producer
- Stag - 2013, associate producer
- Hardsell - 2013, producer
- October Gale - 2014, co-producer
- The Book of Negroes - 2015, co-producer
- Sleeping Giant - 2015, executive producer
- Natasha - 2015, executive producer
- Static - 2016, producer
- My 90-Year-Old Roommate - 2016-2018, executive producer
- Tuesday, 10:08a.m. - 2017, executive producer
- Mary Goes Round - 2017, executive producer
- Be My Guest - 2018, executive producer
- 22 Chaser - 2018, producer
- Sideboob - 2018, executive producer
- Tito - 2019, executive producer
- Propaganda: The Art of Selling Lies - 2019, producer
- Project Ithaca - 2019, executive producer
- My Tree - 2021, producer
- Brother - 2022, producer
- The Young Arsonists - 2022, producer
- The Long Rider - 2022, executive producer
- Valley of Exile - 2023, executive producer
- Mr. Dressup: The Magic of Make-Believe - 2023, executive producer
- Queen Tut - 2023, executive producer
- The Graceless Age: The Ballad of John Murry - 2023, executive producer
- Paying for It - 2024, producer
- Who Owns the World - 2024, executive producer
- The Players - 2025, producer
- Gimme Truth - 2026, producer
- The Banquet - 2026, producer
- Neverman - 2026, producer
