= The Young Arsonists =

2022 Canadian film

- Directed by: Sheila Pye
- Written by: Sheila Pye
- Produced by: Sonya Di Rienzo; Aeschylus Poulos; Agata Smoluch Del Sorbo
- Starring: Maddy Martin; Jenna Warren; Sadie Rose; Madison Baines
- Cinematography: Michael LeBlanc
- Edited by: Lev Lewis
- Music by: Tom Third
- Production companies: Borrowed Light Films; Hawkeye Pictures
- Release date: September 11, 2022 (TIFF)
- Running time: 97 minutes
- Country: Canada
- Language: English

The Young Arsonists is a 2022 Canadian drama film, written and directed by Sheila Pye. The film centres on four teenage girls who form an intense and obsessive bond when they discover and reclaim an abandoned farmhouse.

The film stars Maddy Martin as Nicole, Jenna Warren as Veronica, Sadie Rose as Amber and Madison Baines as Sara. Its supporting cast also includes Aaron Poole, Miranda Calderon, Joe Bostick, Kyle Meagher and Measha Brueggergosman.

The film was shot in fall 2021 in Caledonia, Ontario.

The film premiered in the Discovery program at the Toronto International Film Festival on September 11, 2022.
