= Santa Bárbara de Nexe =

- Civil parish
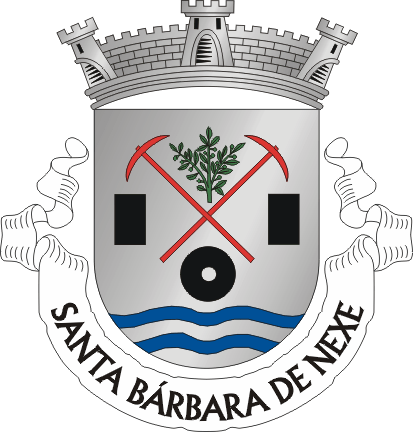
- Coat of arms

- Location in Portugal
- Coordinates: 37.103°N 7.964°W
- Country: Portugal
- Region: Algarve
- Intermunic. comm.: Algarve
- District: Faro
- Municipality: Faro

Area
  - Total: 38.22 km^{2} (14.76 sq mi)

Population (2011)
  - Total: 4,116
  - Density: 107.7/km^{2} (278.9/sq mi)
- Time zone: UTC+00:00 (WET)
  - Summer (DST): UTC+01:00 (WEST)
- Postal code: 8005
- Area code: 289
- Website: www.santabarbaradenexe.pt

Santa Bárbara de Nexe is a village and civil parish in the Portuguese municipality of Faro on the southern Algarve region. The population in 2011 was 4,116, in an area of 38.22 km^{2} (14.76 sq mi). It is located a few kilometers from both the cities of Loulé and Faro.

== History ==
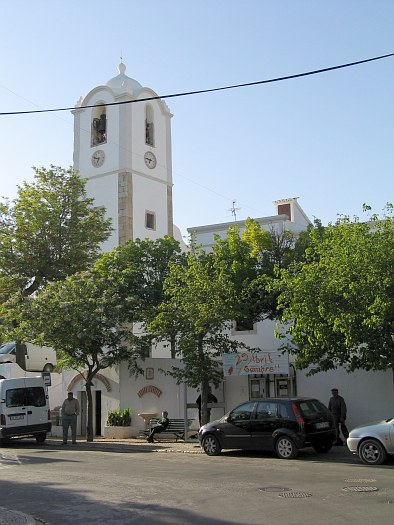
The parochial church of Santa Bárbara de Nexe, constructed over a 12th-century chapel

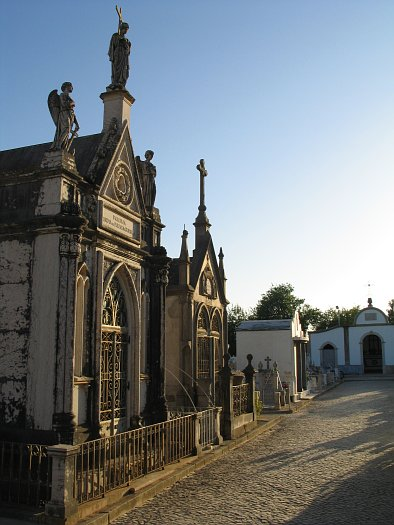
The cemetery of Santa Bárbara de Nexe

Human settlement in the area of Santa Bárbara de Nexe goes back to the Middle Paleolithic (around 30,000 years), and the area came to be inhabited by Pre-Roman peoples of the Iberian Peninsula, namely the Cynetes. Phoenicians, Roman and Arab trading routes crossed these lands across the time, where many came to occupy; the oldest historical resident identified by name was a Roman called Sextus Numisius Eros, from the 2nd century AD: his name was left behind in a local funerary stone. The area had some Phoenician influence before being incorporated by Ancient Rome, became part of the Visigothic Kingdom of Hispania which was ruled by Germanic peoples from Northern and Central Europe, and was conquered by the Moors during the 8th century being incorporated into the Al'Garb Al-Andalus, a region dominated by Muslim invaders from North Africa and the Arab World in general.

The area would eventually be incorporated in the Kingdom of Portugal during the end of the Portuguese Reconquista against the Moors and their Muslim rule, in 1272, by King Afonso III of Portugal. The eldest reference to a place called "Nexe" appears in 1291 in a chart about the boundaries of Faro and Loulé.

During the 14th century, the parochial church was constructed on the site of an ancient chapel.

Santa Bárbara de Nexe became a parish in the 16th century.

== Geography ==
Santa Bárbara de Nexe is located in the Barrocal Algarvio in a natural amphitheater on the flanks of the Serra de Monte Figo, over the Ria Formosa and the Atlantic Ocean.

== Economy ==
The village is a satellite settlement of the city of Faro, the capital of Algarve region. It is home to a number of bars and cafes, including Eddie's Bar, a bar dedicated to the heavy metal band Iron Maiden by Steve Harris, the bassist for the group who was the founder of the bar itself.

== Architecture ==
- Church of Santa Bárbara (Portuguese: Igreja Paroquial de Santa Bárbara de Nexe/Igreja de Santa Bárbara), the Manueline, Baroque and Neoclassic architectural site, developed from the 1444 chapel, supported by the Order of St. James, and recognizable by the complex Gothic-like spine vaulted ceiling in its interior and arches, and the tall vertical, square belltower;
- Hermitage of Santa Catarina (Portuguese: Ermida de Santa Catarina), located in Gorjões, the chapel is a simple 17th century structure, includes a lateral belfrey;

== Culture ==
The Charolas in January are manifestations of the traditional culture of Santa Bárbara known across Portugal as cantar das janeiras, employing popular poetry, improvisation and lack of religious symbology. At the beginning of every year, in January, the Charolas, groups of men and women, accompanied by instruments (accordions, castanets, tambourines, triangles and sometimes clarinet and saxophone), play in the festivals of Bordeira, Santa Bárbara de Nexe and the surrounding homes of friends and local cafés. The Charolas is the name used to describe these groups of man and women in both Alentejo and Algarve regions of Portugal. In other places in Portugal, these groups are just known as singing groups that sing the janeiras songs every January during the period known in Portugal as Reis (Kings). The Charolas, as well as other Portuguese janeiras singing groups across Portugal, play songs and improvised chants to mark the New Year, in a climate of friendship, solidarity and socio-political critiques.

The Charolas of Nexe, during the middle of the 20th century, reached their zenith with the accordionists of Bordeira, that included José Ferreiro and João Barra Bexiga, in addition to the popular poetry of António Aleixo and Clementino Baeta.
