= Hawkeye Pictures =

Canadian film production company

Hawkeye Pictures is an independent Canadian production company based in Toronto, Ontario, Canada. It produces feature films, documentaries and series. Its inaugural project was the Cannes Semaine de la Critique selection Sleeping Giant. In 2022, both Sheila Pye's The Young Arsonists and Clement Virgo's Brother premiered at the Toronto International Film Festival (TIFF). Brother was also one of TIFF Canada's Top Ten films, the winner of a record 12 Canadian Screen Awards, including Best Motion Picture and the 2024 NAACP Image Awards for Outstanding International Motion Picture and Outstanding Independent Motion Picture.

The feature documentary Mr. Dressup: The Magic of Make-Believe, world premiered at TIFF and went on to win the People’s Choice Documentary Award.

In 2024, Sook-Yin Lee's Paying for It world premiered at the Toronto International Film Festival in the Platform Programme. Paying For It was also selected as one of TIFF's Canada's Top Ten films of 2024.

The four-part international documentary series Who Owns the World won Best Factual Series at the 2025 Canadian Screen Awards.

Hawkeye Pictures is owned and operated by Sonya Di Rienzo with partner Aeschylus Poulos.
