= David Kwong =

American magician and puzzler (born 1980)

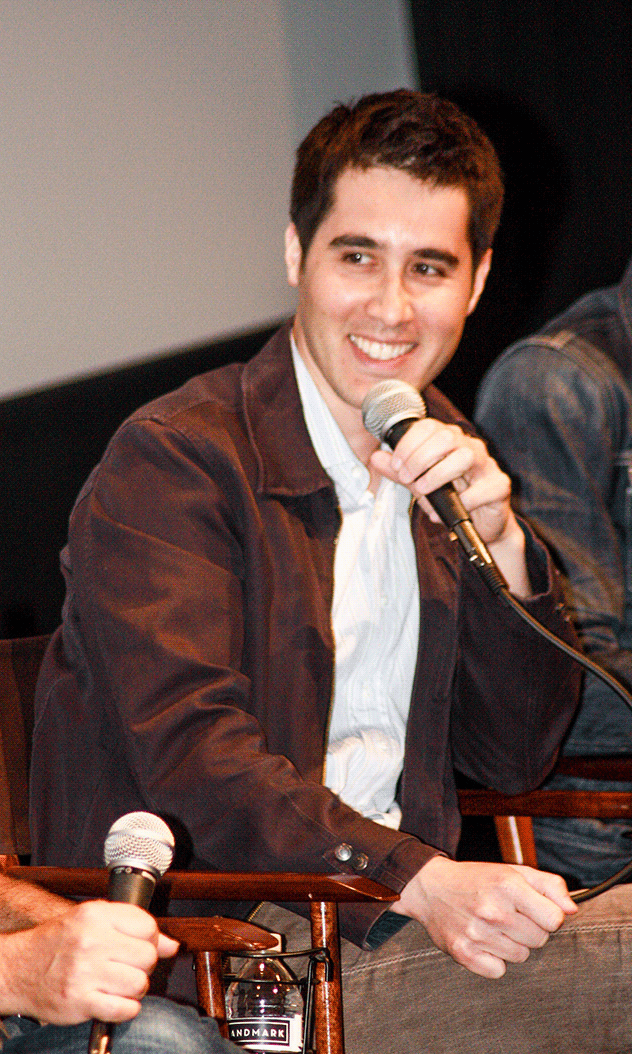
- Kwong at "Now You See Me" Q&A, 2013
- Born: August 20, 1980 (age 46)
- Education: Harvard University
- Occupations: Magician, Mentalist, Puzzler, Producer, Public Speaker
- Years active: 2002 – Present

David Kwong (born 1980) is a magician, mentalist, puzzle creator, writer, and producer. He is the star of Netflix's The Puzzle Room with David Kwong.

Kwong is known for creating illusions and puzzles for film and television and for functioning as a producer and consultant in the field. He produced Deception, ABC's action crime drama about a magician that joins the FBI. Other productions that Kwong has been involved with include Now You See Me (head magic consultant), NBC's Blindspot, The Magnificent Seven, Mission Impossible: Rogue Nation, and The Imitation Game. Kwong also frequently contributes to the New York Times crossword puzzle along with crossword puzzle editor Will Shortz.

== Early life ==
Kwong is a native of Rochester, New York, where both of his parents are professors at the University of Rochester.

Kwong attended Harvard University, where he studied intellectual and cultural history in the history department. He wrote his honors thesis on the history of oriental magicians and their impersonators. He graduated in 2002.

== Career ==
=== Magic ===
Kwong was inspired to pursue professional magic after attending a talk by conjurer Ricky Jay at Harvard University. After graduation, he moved to Hong Kong for two years, where he performed as a magician at cocktail parties. He later moved back to the United States, working in marketing for HBO in New York and later archiving for Ricky Jay in Los Angeles.

Kwong debuted The Enigmatist at The High Line Hotel in New York City on January 4, 2019. Presented by Greg Berlanti and Robbie Rogers, The Enigmatist is an immersive evening of puzzles, cryptology and illusions. The Enigmatist performed on the West Coast in 2021 at the Geffen Playhouse, The Kennedy Center in 2023, and The Chicago Shakespeare Theater in 2024.

=== Public speaking ===
Kwong has given several TED Talks and regularly speaks on the principles of illusion. His main stage TED Talk on magic and puzzles was coordinated with hiding a secret message in The New York Times crossword puzzle. In 2017, he wrote the book Spellbound: Seven Principles of Illusion to Captivate Audiences and Unlock the Secrets of Success.

=== Puzzles ===
The Puzzle Room with David Kwong debuted on May 11, 2026. One of Netflix's first original video podcasts, each week Kwong challenges a pair of celebrity to solve puzzles and play games. He finishes each episode with a feat of mentalism or magic.

Kwong's first crossword puzzle, a joint construction with his friend Kevan Choset, was published in The New York Times on April 1, 2006.

In 2020, Kwong debuted his interactive online puzzle show "Inside the Box", hosted on Zoom, for the Geffen Playhouse, garnering a Critic's Pick from The New York Times.
