= 7 Walks with Mark Brown =

- Sept promenades avec Mark Brown
- Directed by: Pierre Creton; Vincent Barré
- Screenplay by: Pierre Creton; Vincent Barré
- Produced by: Arnaud Dommerc
- Starring: Mark Brown
- Cinematography: Pierre Creton (digital); Antoine Pirotte (16 mm); Sophie Roger (16 mm)
- Edited by: Pierre Creton; Vincent Barré
- Distributed by: Several Futures (United States)
- Release date: 28 June 2024 (France)
- Running time: 103 minutes
- Country: France
- Language: French (with English subtitles internationally)

7 Walks with Mark Brown (French: Sept promenades avec Mark Brown) is a 2024 French documentary film co-directed by Pierre Creton and Vincent Barré. The film follows British paleobotanist Mark Brown on seven hikes through the Pays de Caux region of Normandy, as he identifies rare native plants to help recreate an ancient or primordial garden, sharing insights into their etymology, beauty, and scientific properties with expert tenderness.

== Synopsis ==
7 Walks with Mark Brown is structured as a diptych, divided into two main parts: "The Shooting" and "The Herbarium".

In the first part, "The Shooting", co-directors Pierre Creton and Vincent Barré, along with a small crew, accompany British paleobotanist Mark Brown on seven expeditions across the Pays de Caux region in Normandy. Brown searches for rare endemic plants to recreate a primordial or ancient garden in his own property (referred to as "The Dawn of Flowers"). He explains the etymology, beauty, scientific properties, history, pollination strategies, and ecological significance of the flora with the loving tenderness of a true expert. The sequences capture the group hiking, observing, discussing, eating, drinking, and resting together, emphasizing themes of attention, friendship, and human connection to nature. The footage is shot digitally, with a documentary-like intimacy that includes the filmmaking process itself.

== Production ==
7 Walks with Mark Brown was co-directed and co-edited by Pierre Creton and Vincent Barré.

Digital cinematography was handled by Creton, while 16 mm photography was shot by Antoine Pirotte and Sophie Roger.

The film was produced by Arnaud Dommerc through the French production company Andolfi. Additional production support came from Région Normandie.

Creton, a filmmaker and farmer known for his previous work A Prince (2023), which premiered at Cannes and won the Centre National des Arts Plastiques Prize at FIDMarseille, collaborated again with filmmaker-sculptor Barré. The project draws from their earlier explorations of plant life, including the 2006 short L’arc d’Iris (Souvenir d’Un Jardin), and was inspired by Mark Brown's suggestion after viewing one of their films.

Filming took place in the Pays de Caux region of Normandy with a small crew, blending digital and 16 mm formats to capture both the expeditions and static plant tableaux.

== Release ==
The film premiered in France on June 28, 2024, at the FIDMarseille festival.

It had its North American premiere in the Currents section of the 62nd New York Film Festival (NYFF) in September/October 2024, with a Q&A featuring directors Pierre Creton and Vincent Barré on September 28.

In October 2024, New York-based distributor Several Futures acquired U.S. distribution rights following the NYFF premiere. The deal was negotiated by Several Futures founder Graham Carter with producer Arnaud Dommerc of Andolfi. Several Futures also acquired Creton's earlier films A Beautiful Summer and Va, Toto! for a summer 2025 retrospective of his work.

U.S. theatrical release began in summer 2025, including screenings at BAM (Brooklyn Academy of Music) in June 2025 as part of the "Erotic Nature: The Films of Pierre Creton & Vincent Barré" series, with Q&A sessions. Additional 2025–2026 screenings occurred at L'Alliance New York (June 2025), Museum of the Moving Image (January 2026), TIFF (Canadian premiere), Viennale, Doclisboa, and other festivals.

The film is available on streaming platforms including MUBI, Vimeo On Demand, and Docuseek. A Blu-ray edition was released by Several Futures / Vinegar Syndrome (limited edition with slipcover, bonus shorts by Creton, interviews, and essays), with a release date around January 2026.

An official trailer was released by Several Futures in May 2025.

== Reception ==
7 Walks with Mark Brown received positive reviews in festival and arthouse circles for its humility, simplicity, calm pacing, poetic approach to nature, and intimate portrayal of friendship and attention to the natural world.

Cineuropa praised the film as a "great little film" based on "humility, simplicity and calm", inviting viewers to embrace peace, quiet, and basics while addressing human-induced environmental impacts in a friendly manner. It noted the film's luminosity and return to the spirit of the Lumière brothers amid "dark, dramatic" stories.

In Review Online highlighted getting "caught up in Brown’s love of plants" as one of the film's great pleasures and a key to its success.

Screen Slate described it as featuring a "group of friends, almost a family" with an "unpretentious quality" that gives the film charm, emphasizing nature's origins of relationships and human triviality compared to ancient plant life.
