= Yves Saint Laurent (fashion house) =

French fashion house

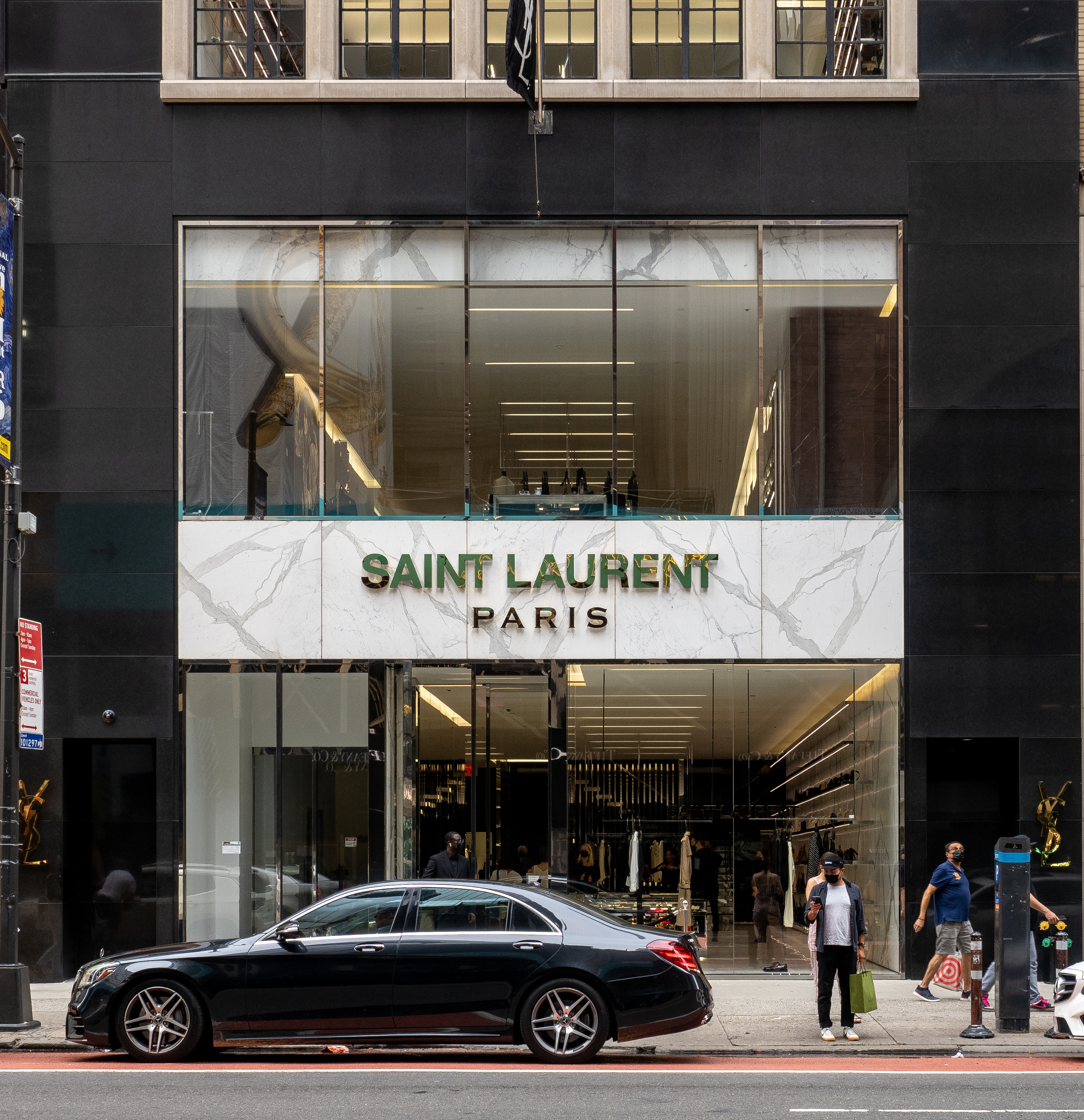
- Saint Laurent location in Midtown Manhattan
- Trade name: Saint Laurent
- Type: Subsidiary
- Industry: Fashion
- Founded: 1961; 65 years ago in Paris
- Founder: Yves Saint Laurent; Pierre Bergé
- Headquarters: 37 Rue de Bellechasse; 75007 Paris; France; 48.8569469°N 2.3216936°E
- Number of locations: 282 stores worldwide (2026)
- Key people: Cédric Charbit (CEO)
- Products: Ready-to-wear; couture; leather accessories; footwear
- Revenue: ▼€2.9 billion (2024)
- Parent: Kering
- Website: www.ysl.com

Yves Saint Laurent (/ˌiːv ˌsæ̃ lɔːˈrɒ̃/, also UK: /- lɒ-/, US: /- loʊ-/; French: [iv sɛ̃ lɔʁɑ̃]), also known as Saint Laurent and YSL, is a French luxury fashion house founded in 1961 by Yves Saint Laurent and his partner, Pierre Bergé. The company specialises in couture, ready-to-wear, leather accessories, and footwear. Its cosmetics line, YSL Beauty, is owned by L'Oréal. Cédric Charbit has been CEO of Yves Saint Laurent since 2024, and Anthony Vaccarello creative director from 2016 to 2026. In 2024, Yves Saint Laurent reported 2.9 billion euros in sales.

== History ==
Logo of Saint Laurent Paris since 2012

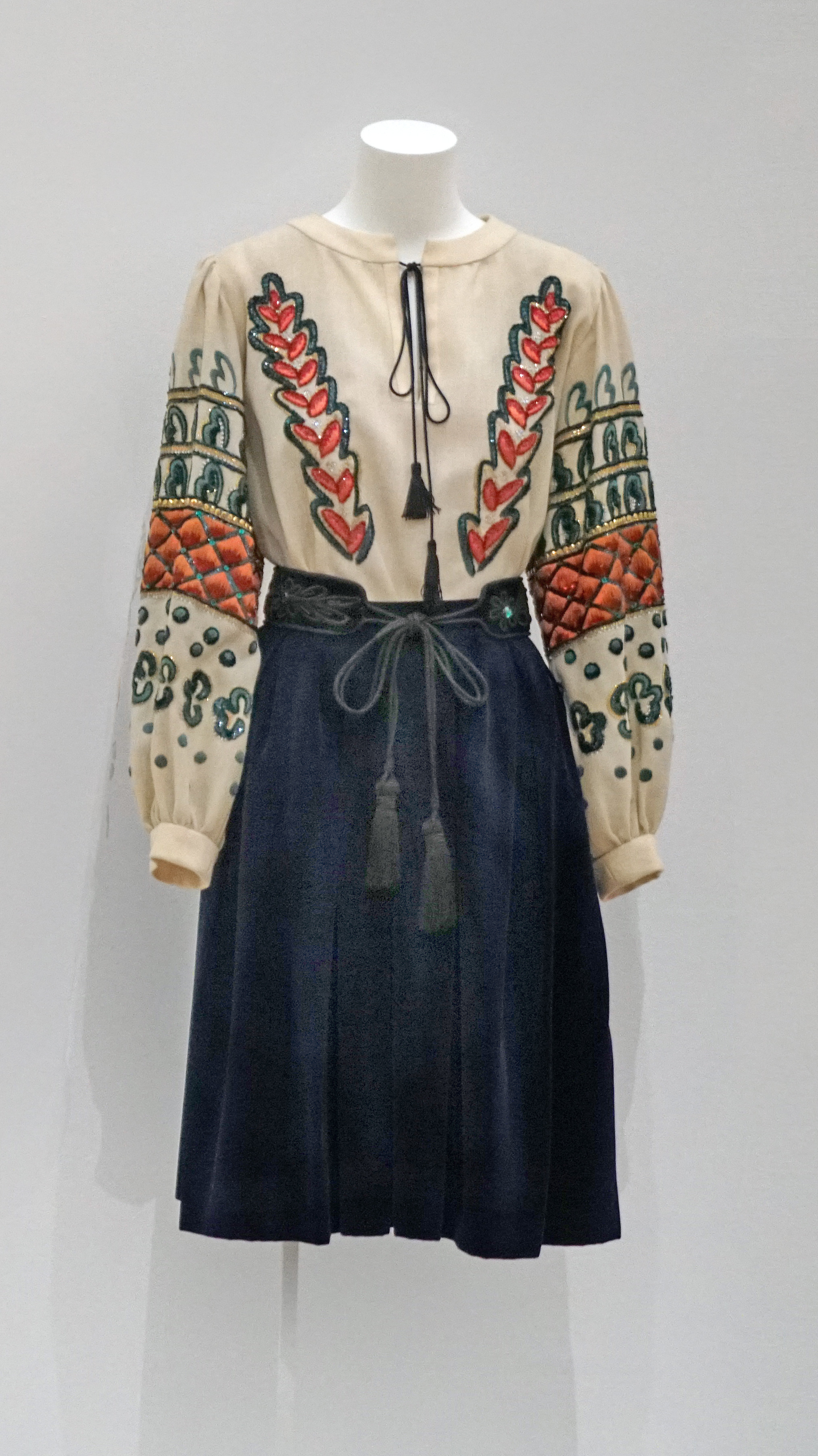
Yves Saint Laurent dress (A/W 1981) inspired by Matisse's La Blouse Roumaine (1969)

The eponymous brand was established in 1962 by designer Yves Saint Laurent and his partner, Pierre Bergé. The brand's logos were designed in 1963 by A. M. Cassandre. During the 1960s and 1970s, YSL popularised the beatnik look, safari jackets, tight pants, and thigh-high boots. In 1966, YSL debuted Le Smoking, a tuxedo suit for women. In an attempt to democratise fashion, YSL began producing ready-to-wear in 1966 with the launch of Rive Gauche and is considered the first to popularise the concept. YSL's designs often featured designs influenced from traditional Chinese clothing, as well as themes from Pop Art, Ballets Russes, and Picasso. Saint Laurent is credited with initiating the broad, shoulder-padded style in 1978, which would go on to characterise 1980s fashion. Saint Laurent's muses included Loulou de La Falaise, Betty Catroux, Talitha Pol-Getty, Catherine Deneuve and Laetitia Casta.

In 1979, interior designers Jed Johnson and Judith Hollander designed the Yves Saint Laurent Enterprises offices in New York with architect Michael Hollander.

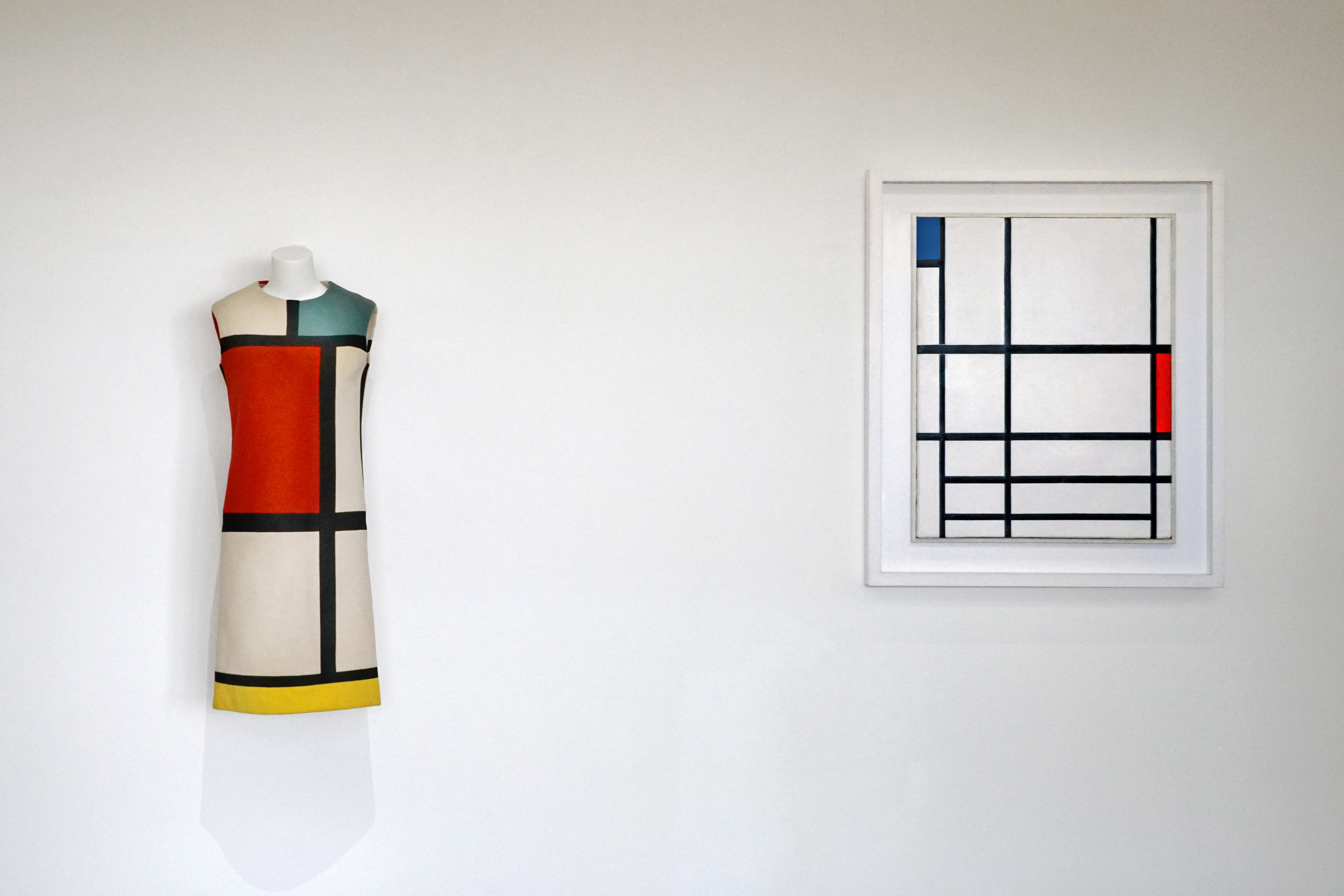
YSL dress "Hommage à Piet Mondrian" (A/W 1965) on left, with inspiration Composition in red, blue and white II by Piet Mondrian on right

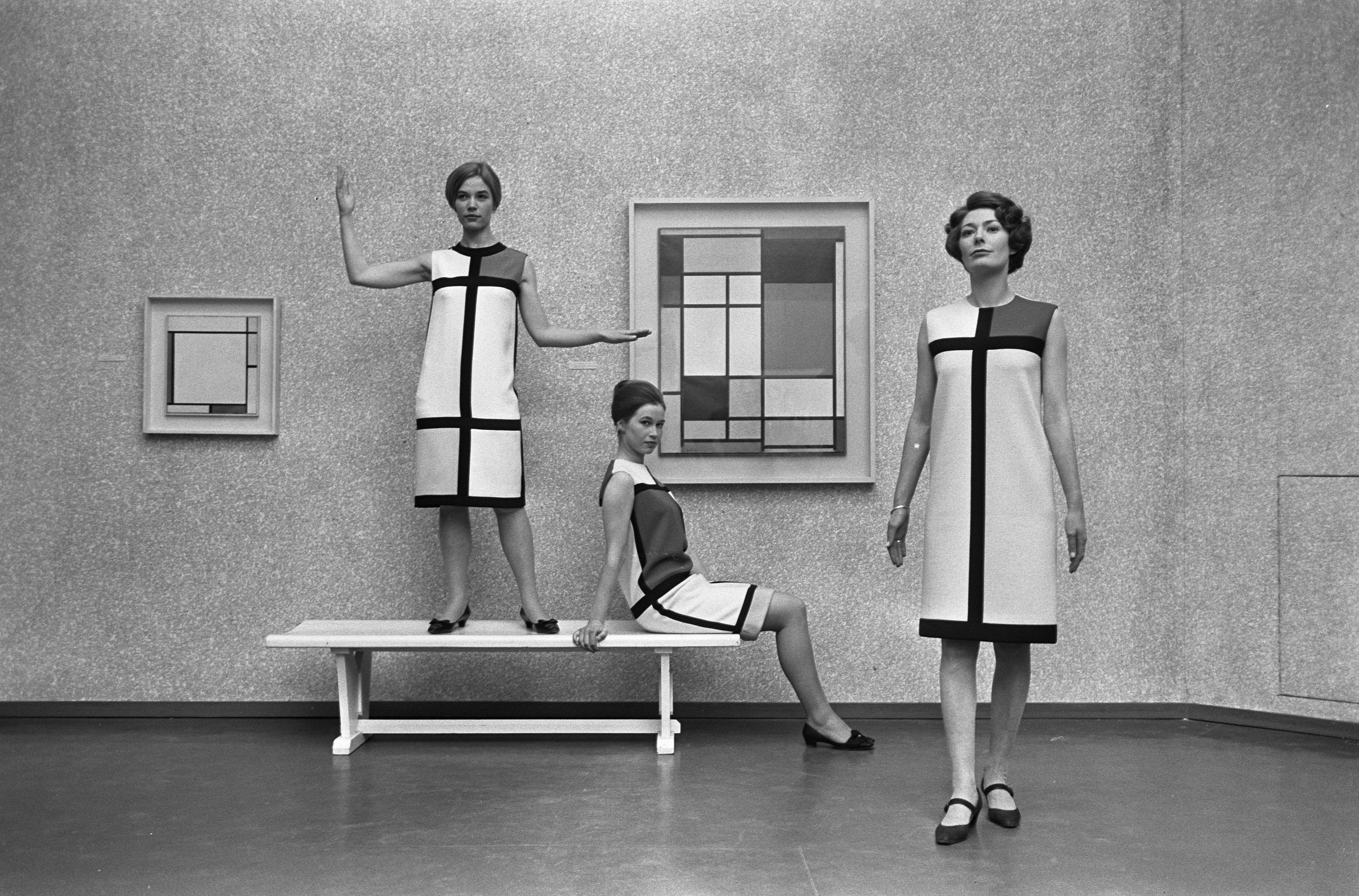
Models in cocktail dresses (A/W 1965) by Yves Saint Laurent inspired by Piet Mondrian art, 1966

The brand expanded in the 1980s and early 1990s with men's and women's fragrances, building upon its cosmetic line introduced in 1978. However, by 1992, the company's profits were in decline, and its share price had fallen. In 1993, Yves Saint Laurent was sold to pharmaceuticals company Sanofi.

In 1997, Pierre Bergé appointed Hedi Slimane as collections and art director and relaunched Rive Gauche Homme. Slimane departed two years later to head couture menswear at Dior Homme.

In 1999, Kering purchased YSL, Alber Elbaz was dismissed, and Tom Ford was hired to design the ready-to-wear collection, while Yves Saint Laurent remained in charge of haute couture. Designs by Tom Ford for YSL were awarded Dress of the Year by the Fashion Museum in 2001 and 2004.

In 2002, the haute couture division was closed. In 2004, Tom Ford departed the company and Stefano Pilati, an Italian-born designer, became creative director. Yves Saint Laurent died of brain cancer in 2008. The following few years proved to be tumultuous for the company, with YSL stores closing in the key U.S. markets of San Francisco and New York (including the company's Madison Avenue location, its first-ever store in the United States). In January 2010, its Chicago boutique on Oak Street also closed.

In 2012, Kering announced Hedi Slimane would return to the brand, replacing Stefano Pilati as creative director for YSL. In 2015, Slimane announced he would revive Yves Saint Laurent's couture line, and proceeded to do so. (Note: The haute couture division (although defunct) is under the control of Fondation Pierre Bergé-Yves Saint Laurent. Even though Yves Saint Laurent Couture operates as a traditional haute couture atelier, there is a legal distinction, and Saint Laurent is not allowed to use the term 'haute couture' when referring to the couture division. Yves Saint Laurent couture is also not shown on the runway and is only available to ‘friends of the house.’) After his appointment, Slimane moved the design studio to Los Angeles, Slimane's home; the couture atelier would remain in France.

Despite Slimane having previously worked with the house, there was controversy following his appointment, particularly after the house announced it would rebrand its ready-to-wear line as "Saint Laurent" (dropping "Yves" from its name). "Yves Saint Laurent" and the YSL vertical monogram logo would remain for accessories and its L'Oréal-owned cosmetics line. Slimane drew inspiration for the name change from the ready-to-wear line Rive Gauche's name when it first launched, "Saint Laurent Rive Gauche".

Parisian boutique Colette began selling shirts with the line "Ain't Laurent without Yves." Saint Laurent requested that the store stop selling the shirts (which it did on its online store). In October 2013, Colette received a letter from YSL accusing it of selling counterfeit products that seriously damaged the brand. Following the accusation, Saint Laurent canceled Colette's order for its Spring 2014 Collection, despite Colette stocking the brand since 1998.

In 2016, Slimane left Saint Laurent and Anthony Vaccarello was appointed creative director. When COVID-19 negatively impacted the sales of YSL, Vaccarello came up with the idea to sell the handbags at a discounted price in bulk to wholesalers, without the authentication and 12-digit serial number leather tag, expanding the brand's market and available price points. In 2017, Vaccarello chose Charlotte Gainsbourg, daughter of Serge Gainsbourg and Jane Birkin, as face of the A/W 2017 campaign. In July 2020, Rosé, a Korean-New Zealand singer-songwriter, was named the first-ever global ambassador of Yves Saint Laurent.

On October 9, 2026, the French fashion house, whose leadership had meanwhile passed from Francesca Bellettini to Cédric Charbit, announced that Vaccarello would no longer be the creative director of the maison without disclosing the reasons behind the replacement of the French designer.

In April 2023, the house launched Saint Laurent Productions, a production company for art cinema. Costumes for films made by the company will be designed by Saint Laurent's creative director, Anthony Vaccarello. The production company's first films are two shorts: Pedro Almodóvar's Strange Way of Life and Jean-Luc Godard's posthumous Trailer Of The Film That Will Never Exist: Phony Wars. Both premiered at the 2023 Cannes Film Festival. The company's next projects were David Cronenberg's film The Shrouds, Paolo Sorrentino's Parthenope, and Jacques Audiard's Emilia Pérez, for which it received its first Oscar nomination at the 97th Academy Awards in addition to the Jury Prize at the 2024 Cannes Film Festival. In November 2024, Cédric Charbit replaced Francesca Bellettini as CEO of Yves Saint Laurent.

Yves Saint Laurent Archive Gallery
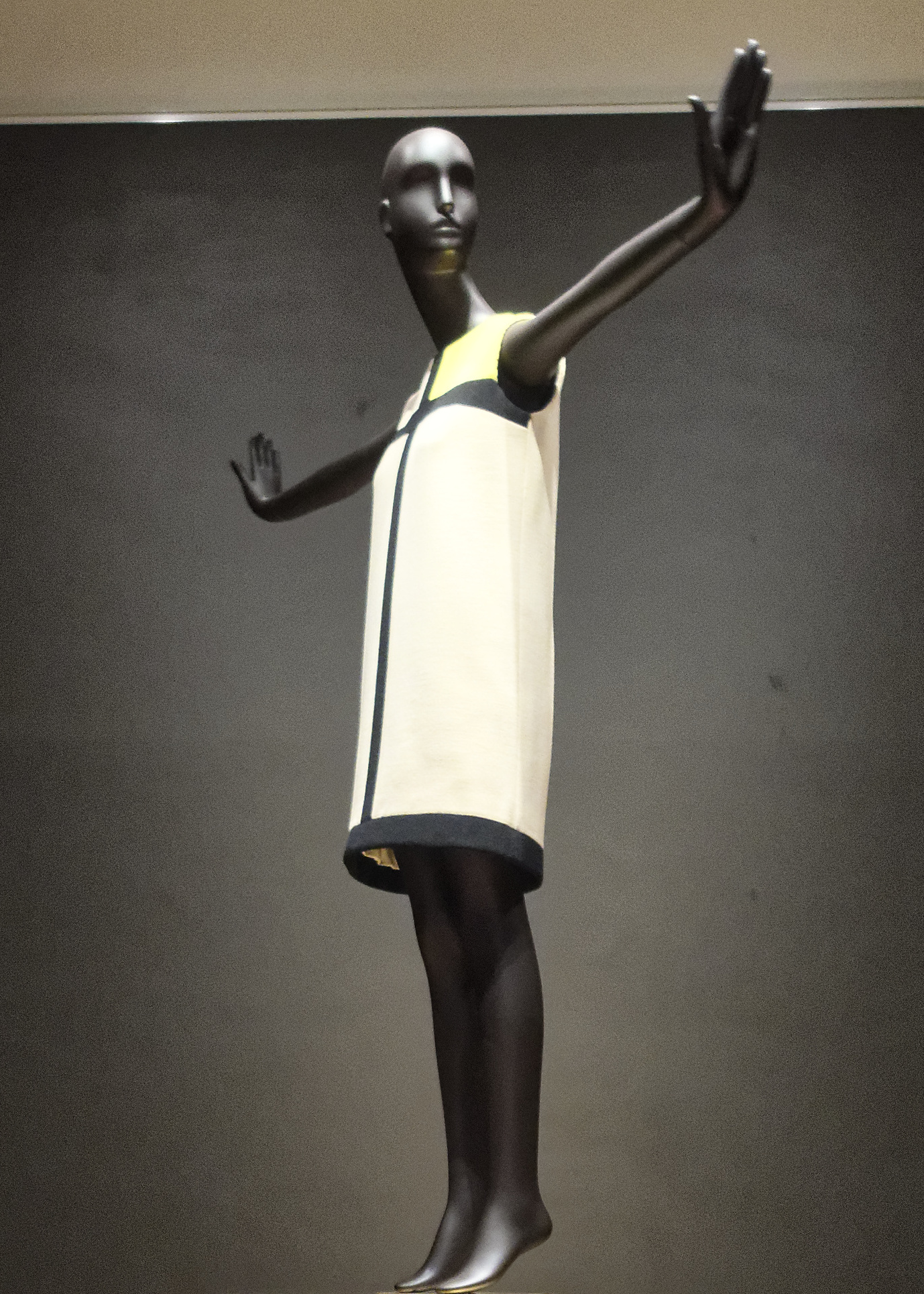
Hommage à Piet Mondrian, A/W 1965

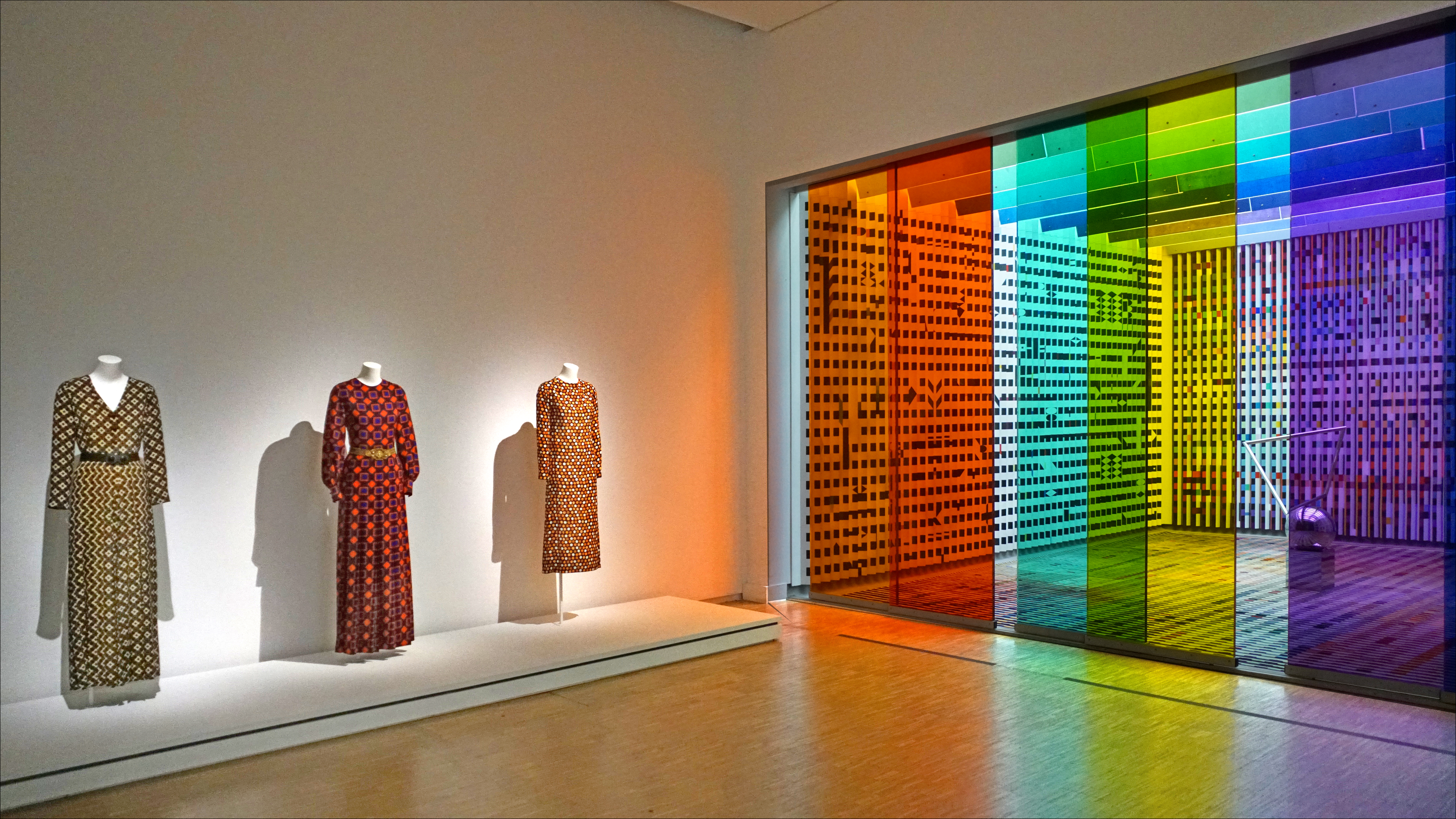
Silk jumpsuit, A/W 1970; wool dress, A/W 1968; silk dress, A/W 1969

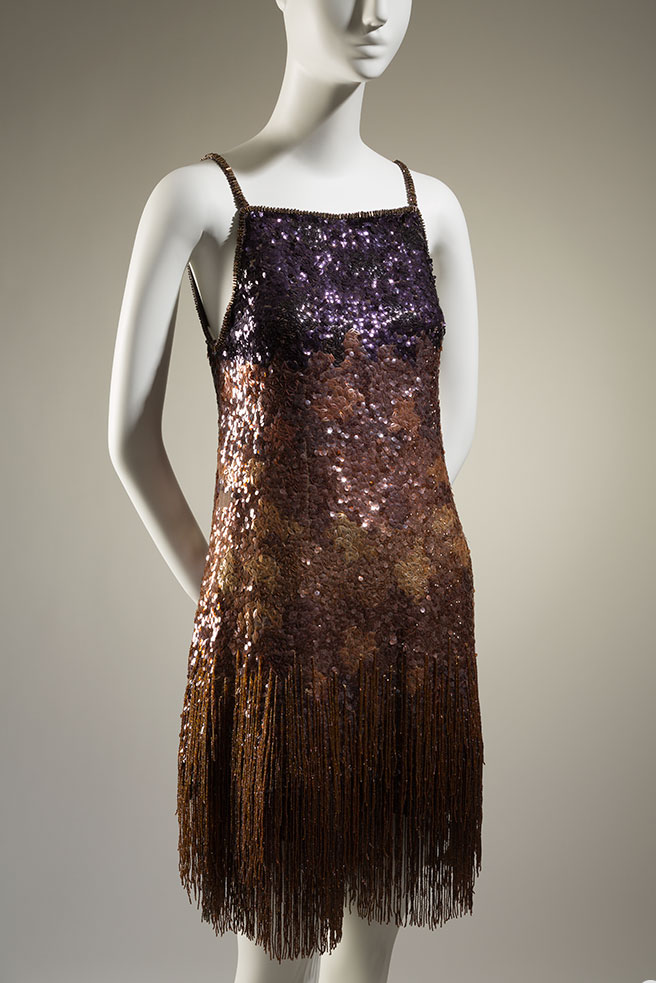
Beaded silk evening dress, A/W 1969

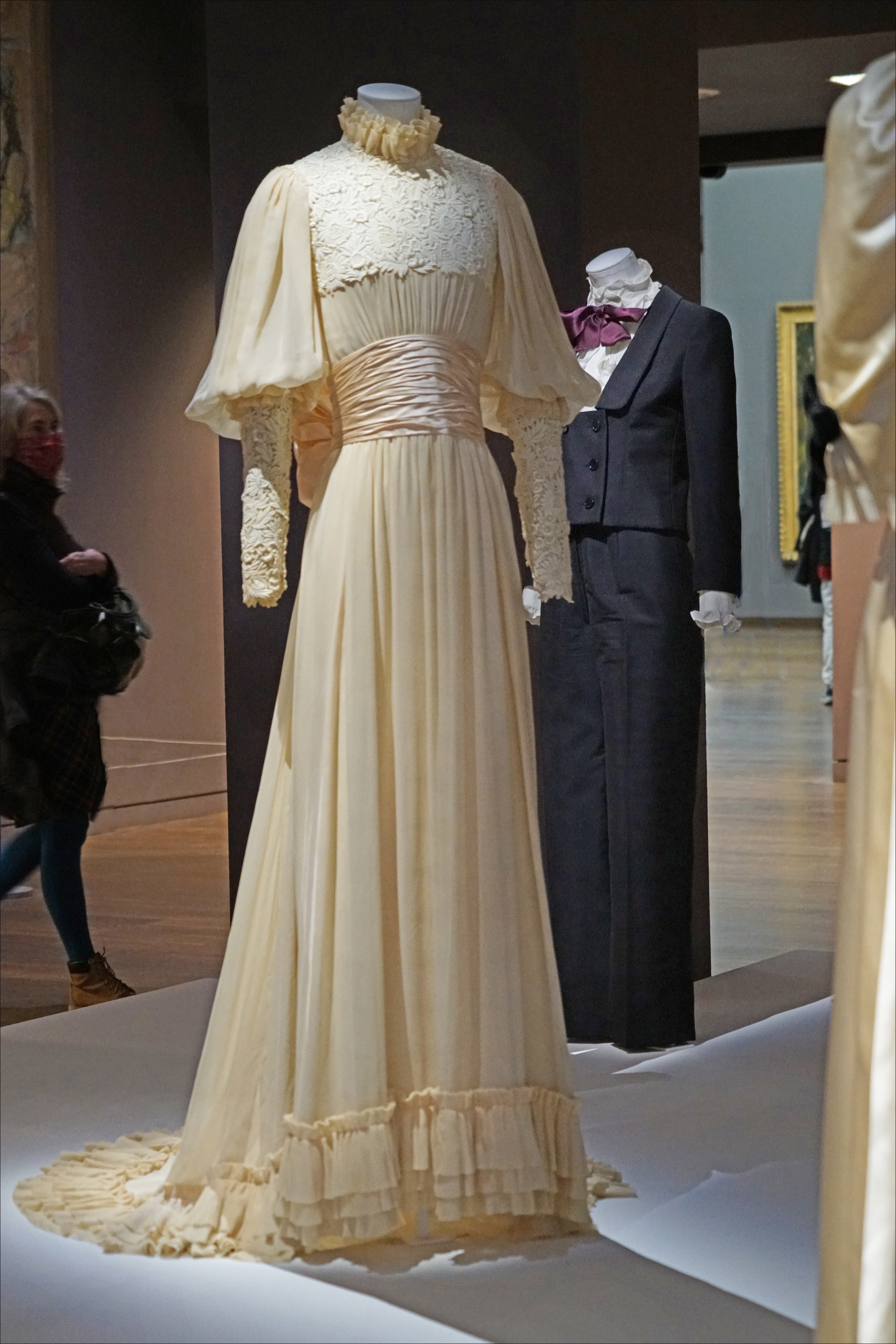
Evening gown designed for Jane Birkin, 1971

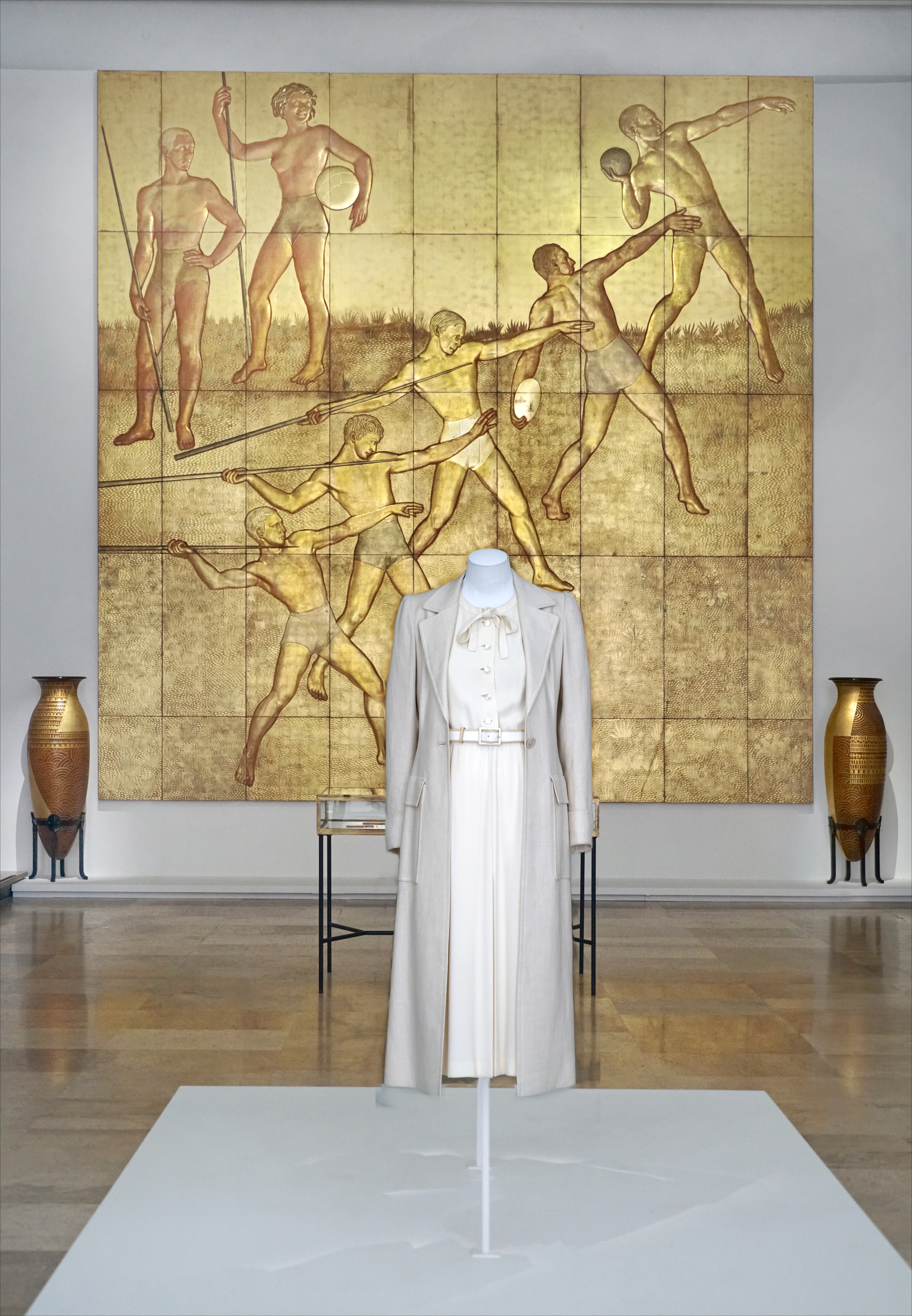
Designed for Anny Duperey in 1974 film Stavisky

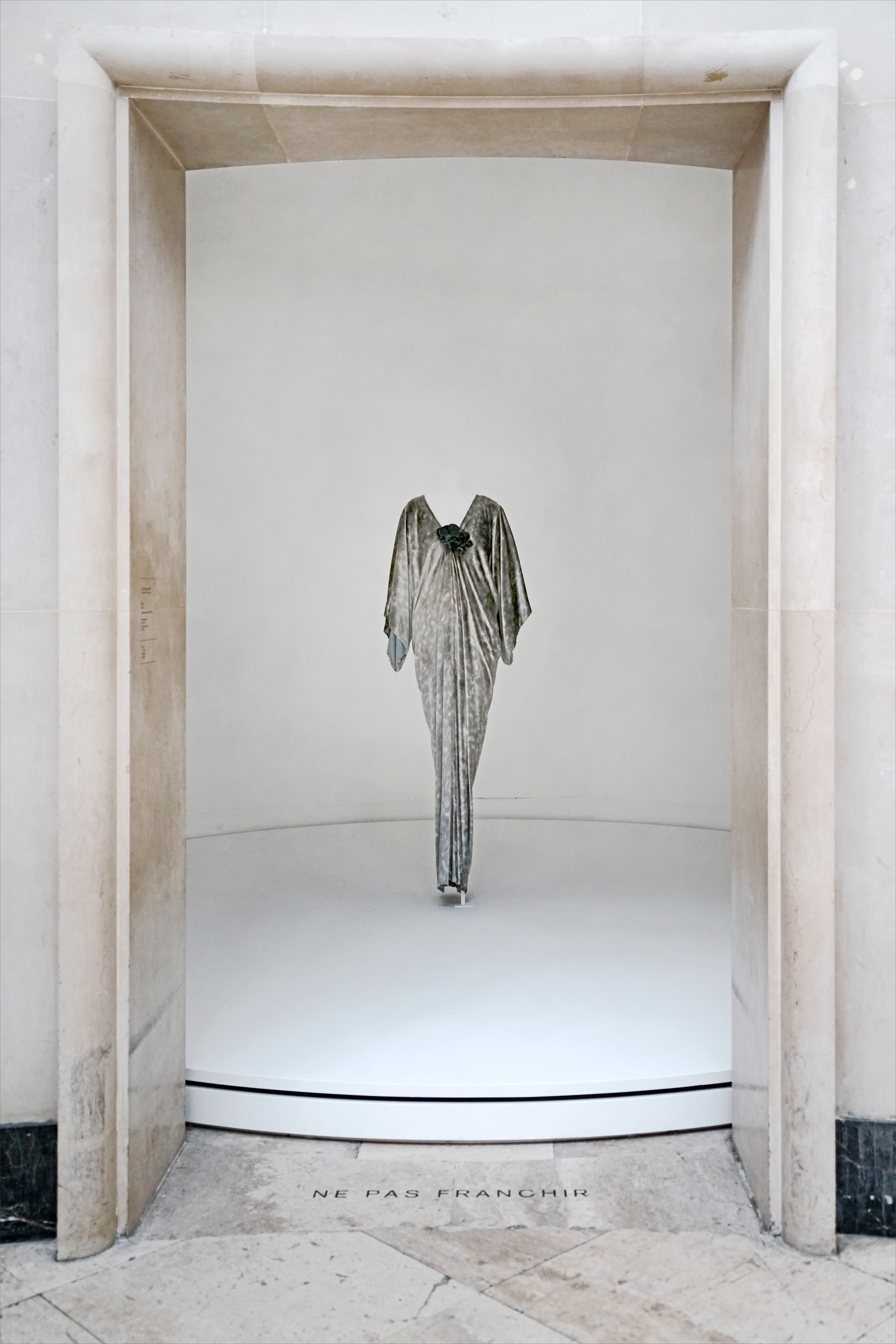
Evening dress, A/W 1975

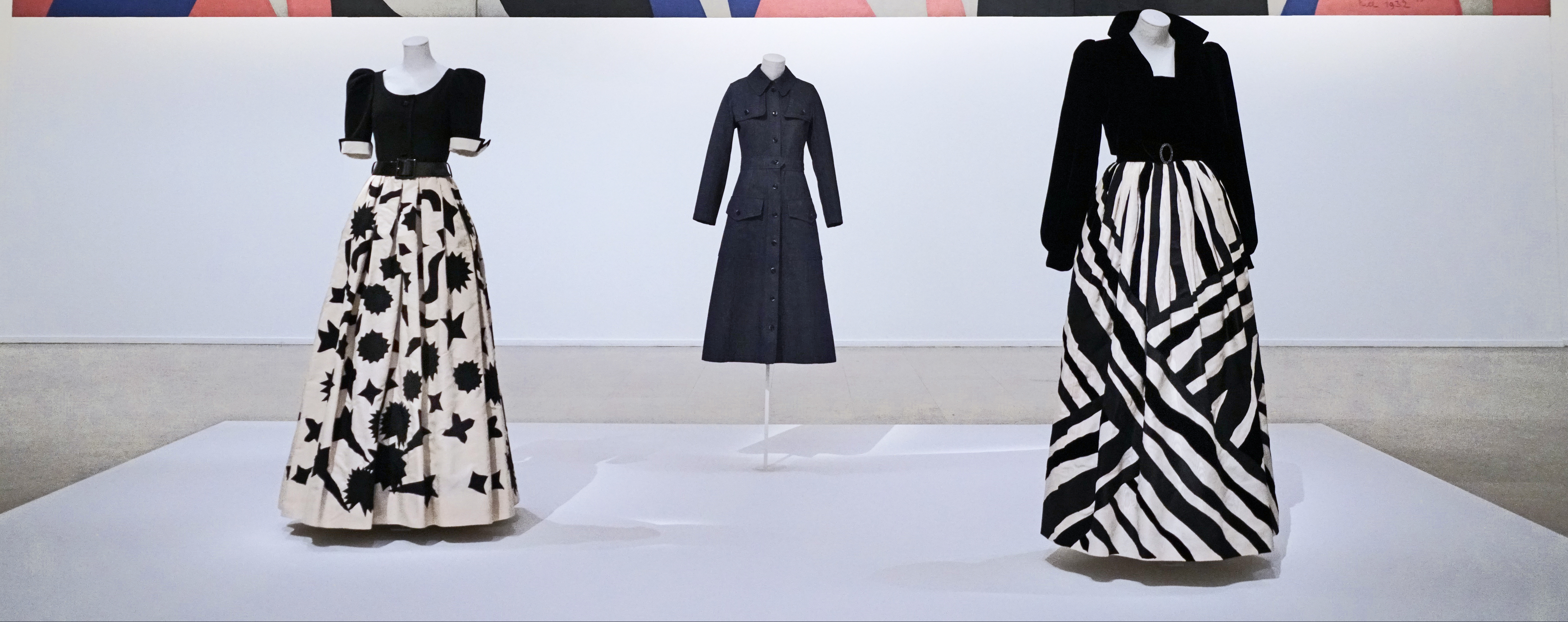
Inspired by Henri Matisse: S/S 1982; S/S 1970; A/W 1981

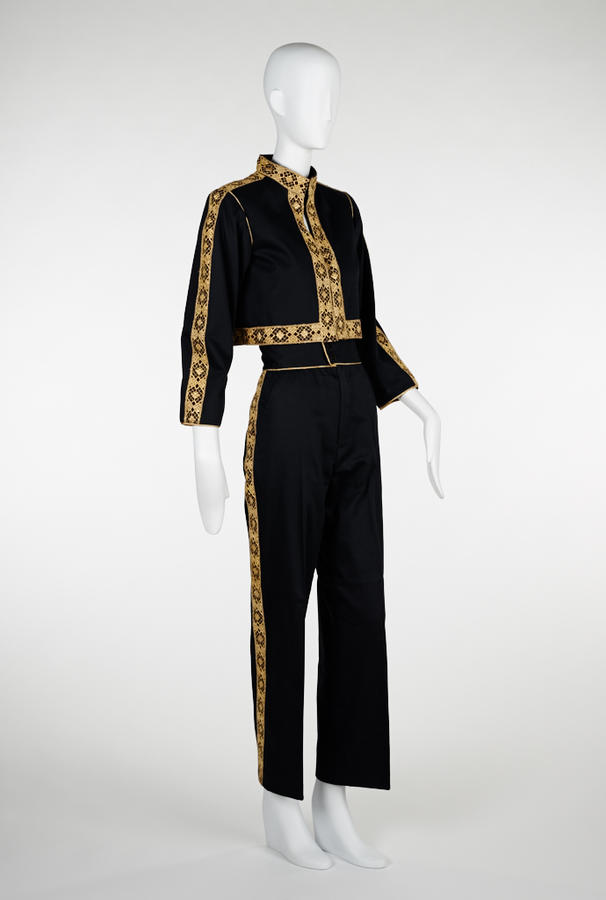
Black satin pantsuit, ca. 1980

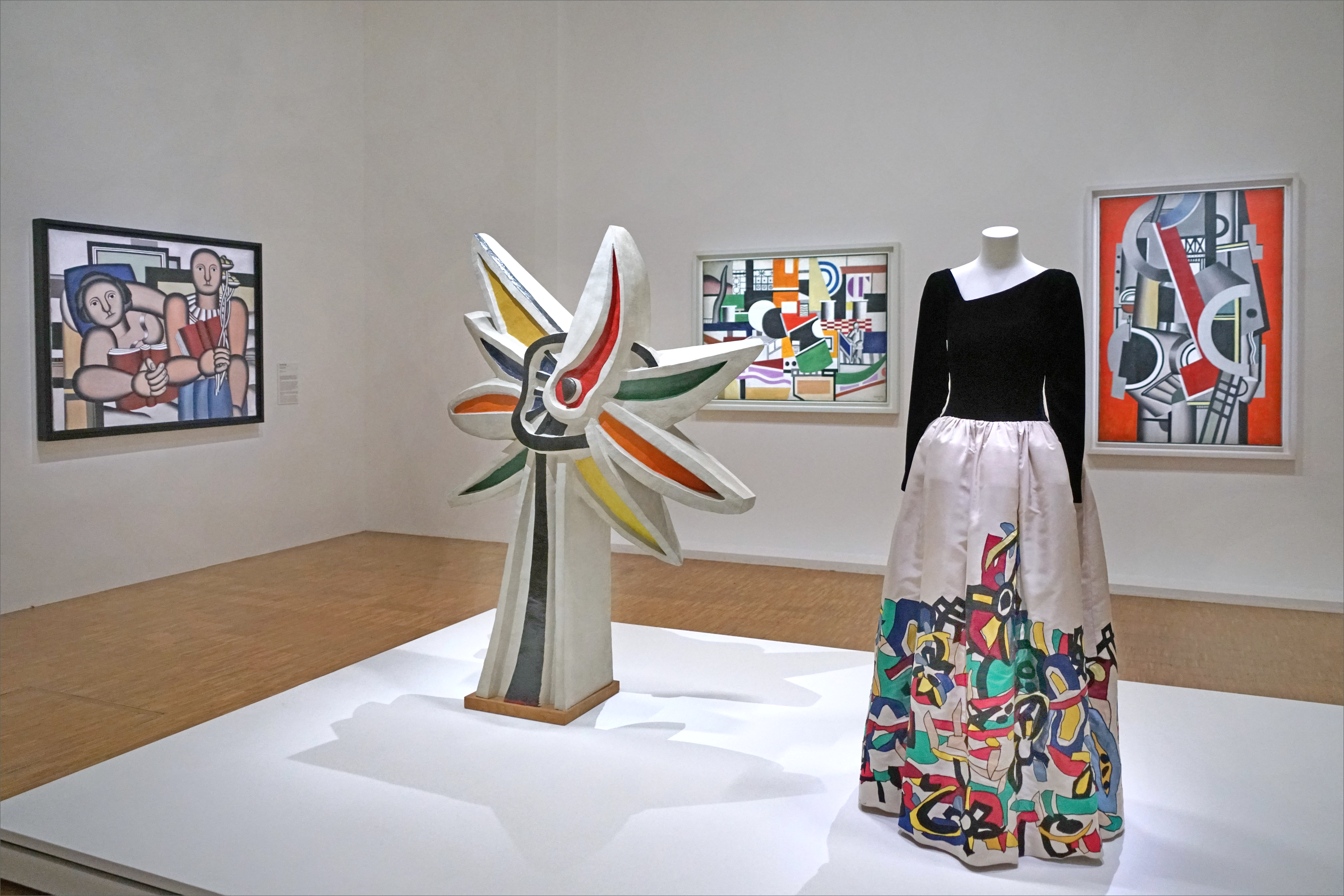
Hommage à Fernand Léger, A/W 1981

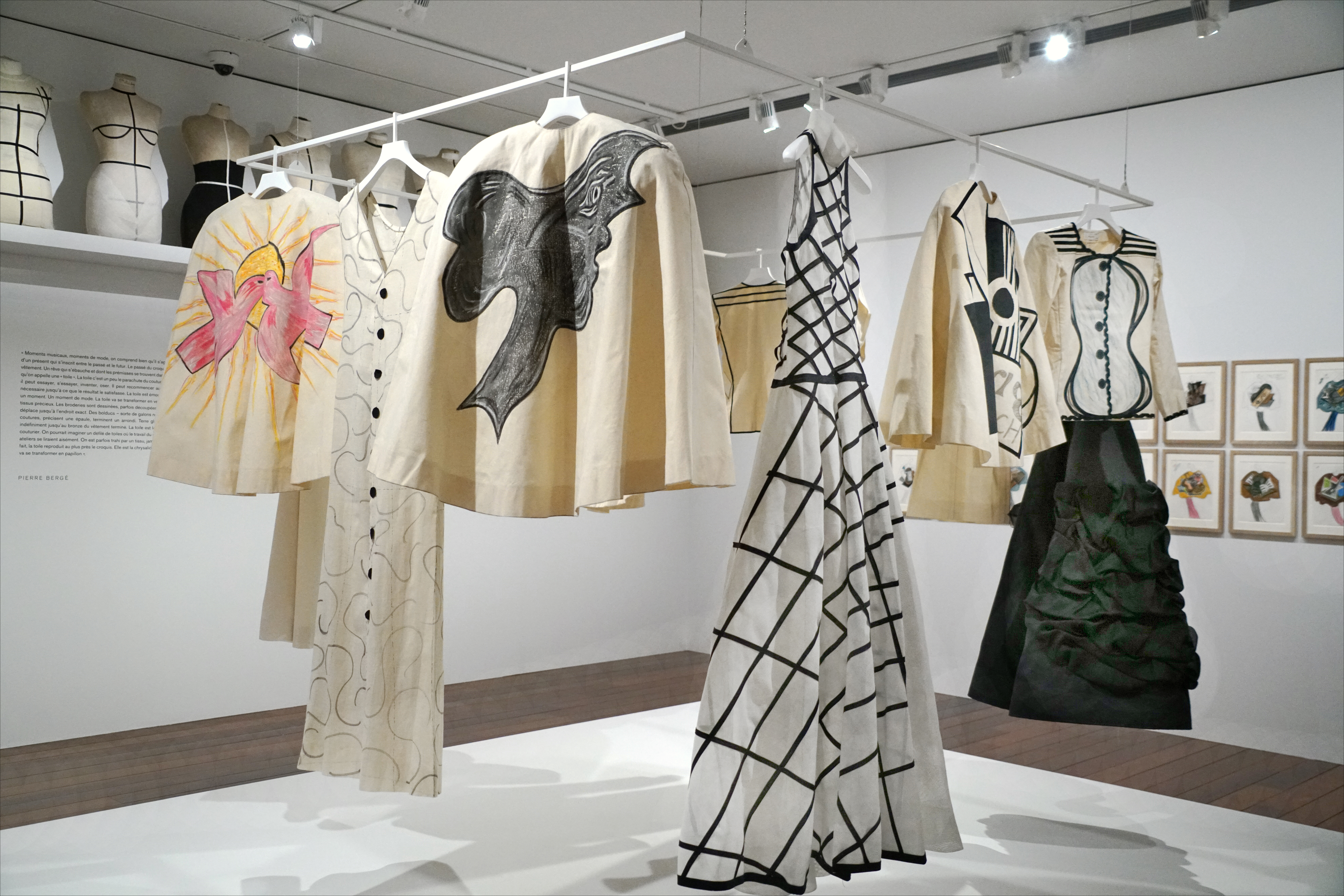
Hommage à Georges Braque, S/S 1988

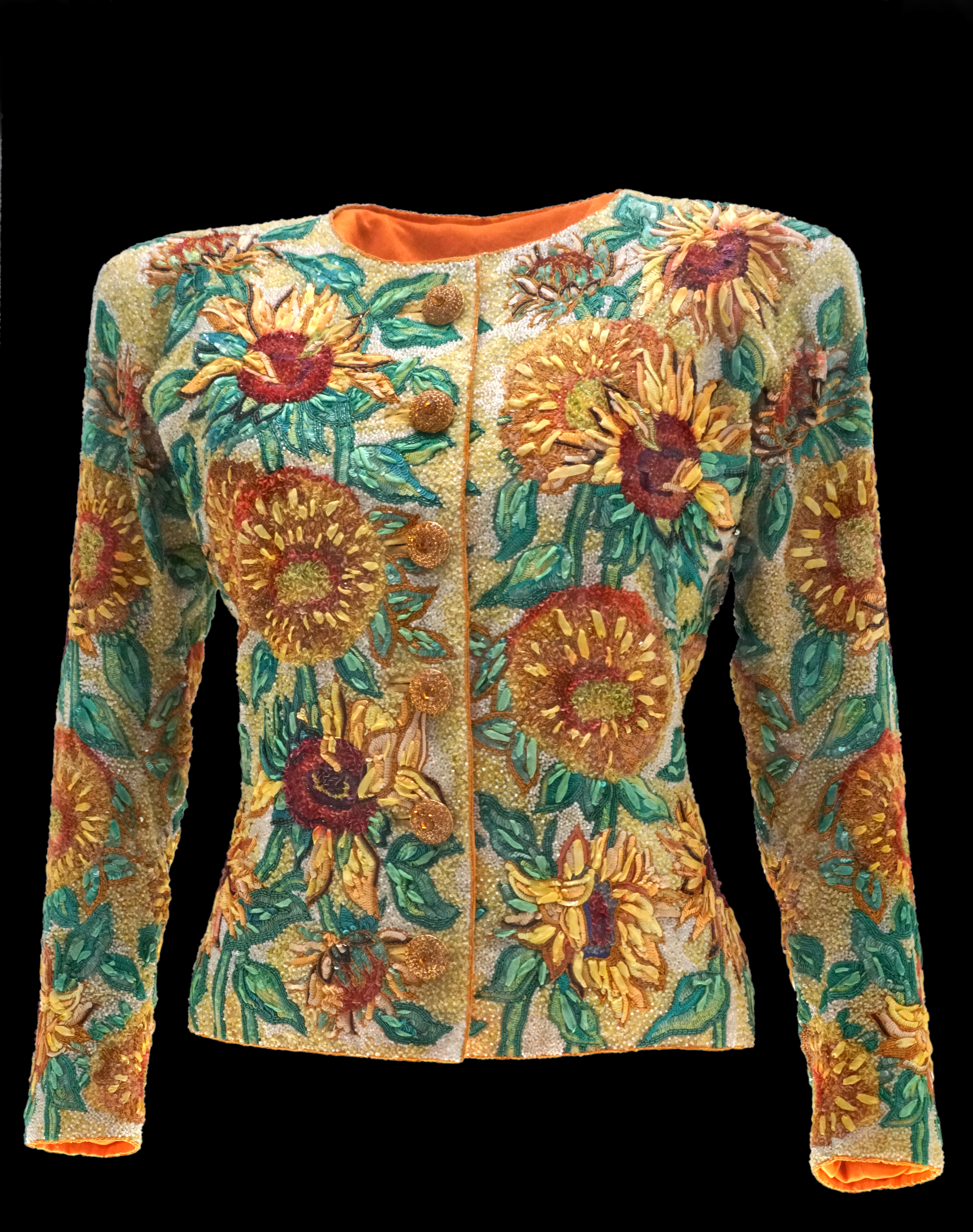
Hommage à Vincent van Gogh, S/S 1988

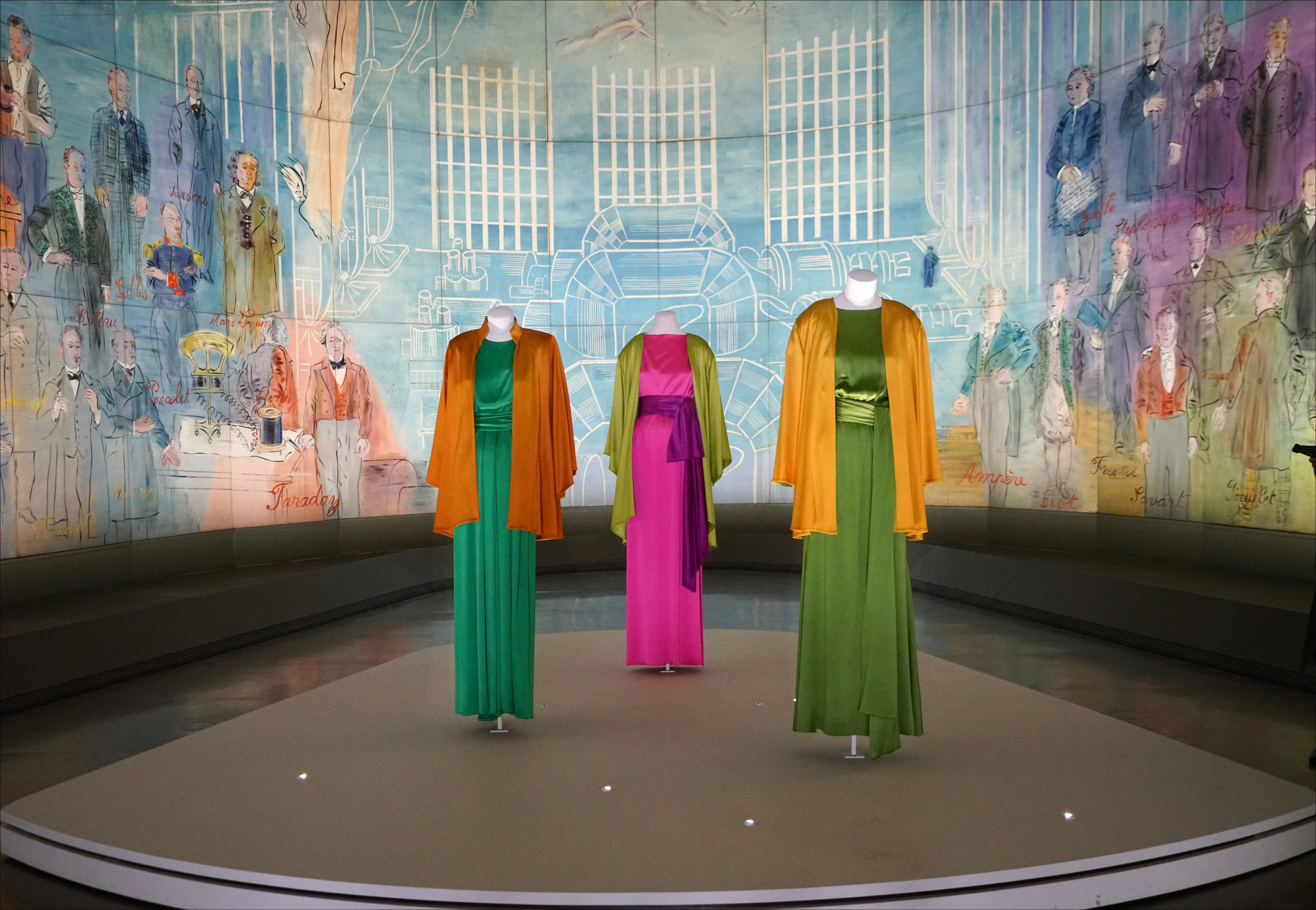
A/W 1992

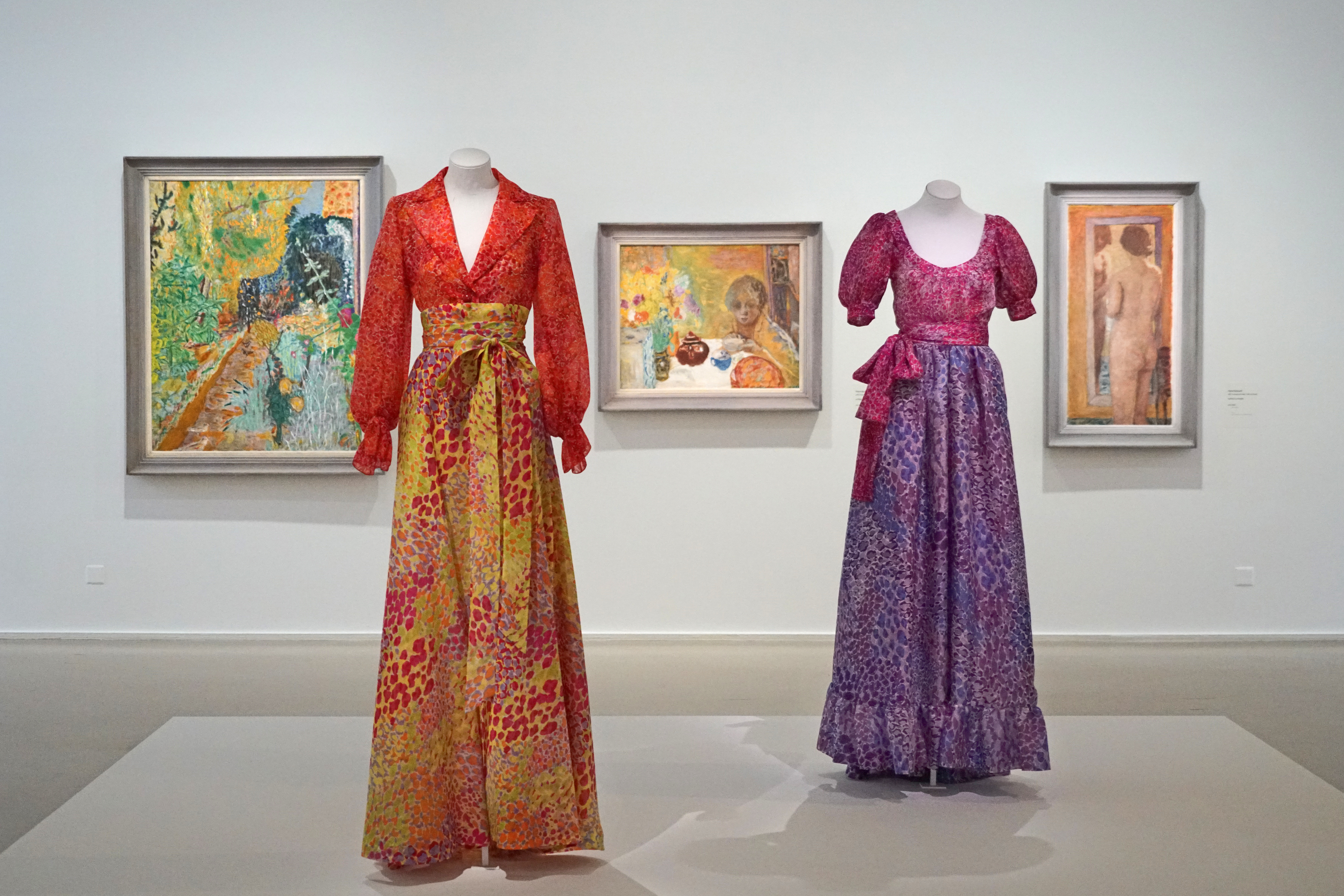
Dresses inspired by Pierre Bonnard, S/S 2001

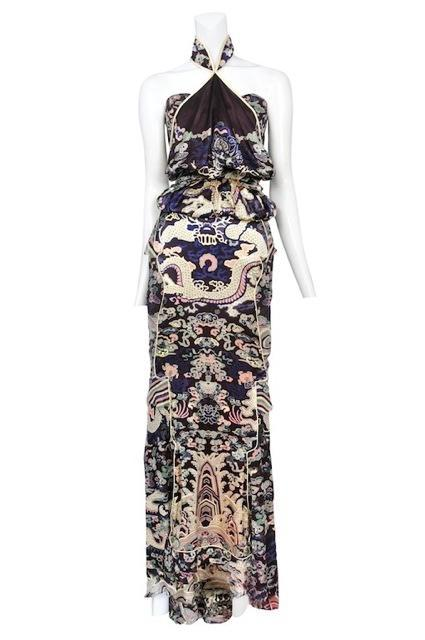
A/W 2004 by Tom Ford, Fashion Museum's Dress of the Year

== Governance ==
=== CEOs ===
- 2013–2024: Francesca Bellettini
- Since 2024: Cédric Charbit

=== Creative directors ===
- 1998–2000: Alber Elbaz
- 2000–2004: Tom Ford
- 2005–2011: Stefano Pilati
- 2012–2016: Hedi Slimane
- 2016–2026: Anthony Vaccarello
- Since 2026: Announcement coming soon

== Retail locations ==
A total of 282 boutiques are in operation across 48 countries, as of May 2026:

- Asia: 104 boutiques
- Africa: 1 boutique
- Central America: 2 boutiques
- Central Asia: 1 boutique
- Europe: 76 boutiques
- Middle East: 14 boutiques
- North America: 71 boutiques
- Oceania: 10 boutique
- South America: 3 boutiques

== Financial results ==
| Year | Revenue (billion €) |
|---|---|
| 2021 | 2.5 |
| 2022 | 3.3 |
| 2023 | 3.2 |
| 2024 | 2.9 |

=== Tax evasion ===
According to an investigation by Mediapart and the European Investigative Collaborations (EIC) network, the company Yves Saint Laurent evaded approximately €180 million in taxes in France between 2009 and 2017, through an offshore scheme organised by its parent company Kering. Between 2009 and 2017, the journalists detail, €550 million in profits were thus returned to a Swiss subsidiary of Kering, called Luxury Goods International (LGI), whose profits were taxed at around 8% by the canton of Ticino with the help of a tax agreement (while the corporate tax rate is 33% in France), while the company officially only realised €7 million in cumulative profits in France between 2009 and 2016 (resulting in an imposition of €430,000).

== Advertising and criticism ==
In June 2015, the company was criticised for an advertisement published in the Elle UK magazine that was banned by the UK advertising regulator, which ruled that the model featured in it was "unhealthily thin". On March 8, 2017, a new advertisement for the Fall 2017 collection offended internet users who saw it as a "degrading vision of women" and again the use of anorexic models. The company was ordered to remove two posters from this campaign by the French Advertising Standards Authority (ARPP), which ruled them "degrading".

In February 2025, Yves Saint Laurent faced controversy in response to the inclusion of Palestinian rapper Saint Levant in a promotional video for an YSL-branded omakase restaurant in Paris, with pro-Israel groups and media calling for a boycott of the brand over Saint Levant's alleged "antisemitism".
