= In Flames (film) =

2023 Pakistani-Canadian film

- Cannes release poster
- Directed by: Zarrar Kahn
- Written by: Zarrar Kahn
- Produced by: Anam Abbas
- Starring: Ramesha Nawal; Bakhtawar Mazhar; Omar Javaid
- Cinematography: Aigul Nurbulatova
- Edited by: Craig Scorgie
- Music by: Kalaisan Kalaichelvan
- Production companies: CityLights Media; Other Memory Media; Fae Pictures
- Distributed by: XYZ Films
- Release dates: May 19, 2023 (Cannes); October 20, 2023 (Pakistan); April 12, 2024 (Canada)
- Running time: 98 minutes
- Countries: Pakistan; Canada
- Language: Urdu

In Flames is a 2023 Pakistani-Canadian supernatural horror drama film written, directed and co-edited by Zarrar Kahn in his feature directorial debut. The film stars Ramesha Nawal, Bakhtawar Mazhar, Adnan Shah Tipu, Mohammad Ali Hashmi and Omar Javaid.

Set in contemporary Karachi, the film centres on Mariam (Nawal), a young woman who is haunted by visions of the past, after the death of the family's patriarch leaves her and her mother, Fariha (Mazhar) in a vulnerable social position in a highly patriarchal society.

In Flames had its world premiere at the 2023 Cannes Film Festival on 19 May 2023 in the Directors' Fortnight section, where it competed for the Camera d'Or.

This marked Pakistan's return to Director's Fortnight after more than four decades. The film received critical acclaim at Cannes, followed by a North American premiere at the Toronto International Film Festival and winning Best Picture at the Red Sea International Film Festival.

It premiered in Pakistan on 20 October 2023 and received generally positive reviews from critics.

The film was selected as the Pakistani entry for the Best International Feature Film at the 96th Academy Awards, but was not accepted as a nominee.

== Synopsis ==
Set in modern-day Karachi, the film opens with the death of the family patriarch. Mother and daughter find themselves in a precarious situation where their existence is ripped apart. In order to survive in a hostile world dominated by men, the two women have to work together in the face of threats both real and supernatural.

== Cast ==
- Ramesha Nawal as Mariam
- Bakhtawar Mazhar as Fariha, Mariam's mother
- Omar Javaid as Asad
- Mohammad Ali Hashmi as Saleem
- Adnan Shah Tipu as Uncle Nasir

== Production ==
Kahn, a Pakistani Canadian director who has worked in both countries, wrote the film as a commentary on patriarchy and sexism in Pakistan.

He described the genre elements of the film being an "extension of the characters' experience...to be in the shoes of Mariam and Fariha, to be suffocated.. and how much power there is in their resistance”.

The film was shot in Karachi in February 2022.

Kahn produced the film through his company CityLights Media, which received funding from the Telefilm Talent to Watch program. Other Memory Media co-produced with Fae Pictures as the executive producers on the film.

== Release ==
=== Premiere and festival screenings ===
In Flames had its world premiere at the 76th Cannes Film Festival in the Director's Fortnight section on 19 May 2023. XYZ Films, a US-based firm, has taken up the international rights for the film, while North American distribution was acquired by Game Theory Films. French rights of the film were acquired by The Joker.

The film was invited to the 2023 Toronto International Film Festival in the "Contemporary World Cinema" section and was screened on 14 September 2023. It was also selected as part of the 28th Busan International Film Festival's "A Window on Asian Cinema" section, screening on 7 October 2023. Later in October, it was invited to the 57th Sitges Film Festival as part of the Official Fantastic section, held from 3 to 13 October 2024.

=== Theatrical ===
The film was released in Pakistan on October 20, 2023, and was released in Canada on April 12, 2024.

== Critical response ==
On the review aggregator website Rotten Tomatoes, the film has a score of 95% by the consensus of 37 critics' reviews. Metacritic, which uses a weighted average, assigned the film a score of 75 out of 100, based on 9 critics, indicating "generally favorable" reviews.

Christian Zilko of IndieWire wrote that "Zarrar Kahn’s genre-bending horror movie — which has the well-deserved honor of being the first Pakistani film to premiere in the Directors’ Fortnight in over four decades — is a Kafkaesque saga of niceties gone awry. What begins as a story of a poor family relying on the kindness of their community quickly turns into a hellish tale of how the ground is always shifting underneath you when all of your benefactors have an angle. Kahn's masterful use of red herrings and subtext creates an environment where nobody ever quite knows where they stand. It's a seedy ride through a bleak existence that would be entertaining enough to watch with popcorn if it didn't depict a life that's all too real for too many people."

Manuel Betancourt of Variety wrote that "Anchored by a dizzying central performance by Nawal, whose screen presence draws viewers into Mariam’s mind-melding reality with great zeal, In Flames finely straddles the line between a bold genre exercise and a bruising portrait of contemporary Pakistan to deliver a welcome story about resistance and resilience."

Shelagh Rowan-Legg of Screen Anarchy wrote that "In Flames in an intense psychological horror, one that tightens its vice with a slow and deliberate intensity that challenges the viewer to feel what it's like to have your every move, every thought questioned, mocked, until you are backed into a corner with no way out."

For The Hollywood Reporter, Lovia Gyarkye wrote that "In Flames teases out how the patriarchy — a large, unruly force — fractures the relationship between mother and daughter. Kahn depicts Mariam and Fariah's parallel experiences, observing how each of them tries to regain a sense of agency. Mariam uses a sympathetic driver to help her figure out what happened to Asad, while Fariah attempts to seduce a lawyer she hired to fight Nasir into lowering his legal fees. These scenes are tinged with a stressful desperation, as the women find themselves further constricted by society."

Allan Hunter of Screen Daily wrote that "In Flames is well-crafted, the sound design capturing the jarring sounds of the city at night which seem designed to set everyone on edge. Production designer Matti Malik fills Mariam's home with rich red earth and terracotta colours, lending it the warmth of a sanctuary – albeit one that is increasingly under threat. Kahn slightly drops the ball as he creates a muddled, jeopardy-driven climax that is in too much of a hurry to tie everything up. In the end, however, what lends this film distinction is the way it evolves into a story of female empowerment, and the bond between mother and daughter as they combat the pernicious evils of a patriarchal society."

Siddhant Adlakha of JoySauce.com described the film as "a fine-tuned, socially oriented character drama in the shape of a supernatural thriller, with personal demons that take the form of cultural fanaticism, as a woman struggles to make her voice heard in a society hellbent on suffocating her."

== Accolades ==
The film won the Golden Yusr Award for Best Picture at the Red Sea International Film Festival 2023.

It took home the top prize at the Mannheim-Heidelberg International Film Festival, the International Newcomer Award

Further accolades include winning Best Feature at the International South Asian Film Festival (iSAFF) in 2023.

The film was shortlisted for the Directors Guild of Canada's 2023 Jean-Marc Vallée DGC Discovery Award, and won the John Dunning Best First Feature Award at the 12th Canadian Screen Awards in 2024.

== See also ==
- List of submissions to the 96th Academy Awards for Best International Feature Film
- List of Pakistani submissions for the Academy Award for Best International Feature Film
