= Zarrar Kahn =

Pakistani director

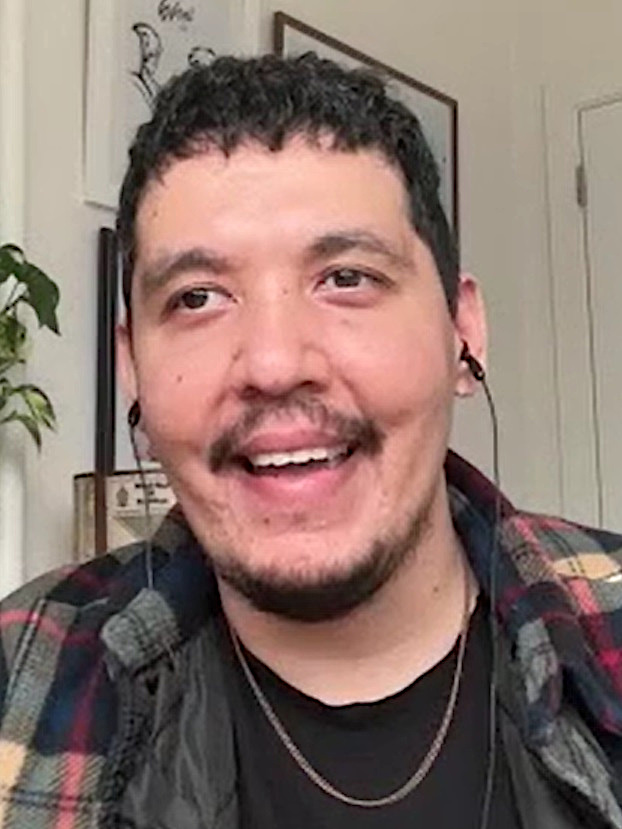
- Kahn in 2024
- Born: 1991 (age 34–35); Karachi, Pakistan
- Education: Queen's University (BA); Canadian Film Centre (Director's Lab)
- Occupations: Director; Screenwriter; Producer

Zarrar Kahn, also sometimes credited as Hamza Bangash, is a Pakistani Canadian film director and screenwriter, whose feature film directorial debut In Flames premiered at the 2023 Cannes Film Festival, and was Pakistan's official submission for Best International Feature Film at the 96th Academy Awards in 2024.

== Early life ==
Originally from Karachi, Pakistan, he spent part of his childhood there before emigrating with his family to Mississauga, Ontario, Canada. He has continued to live and work in both countries, with most of his films being Pakistani-Canadian co-productions.

== Career ==
His first short, Dia, won the Audience Award during the 2020 Locarno Film Festival. Stray Dogs Come Out at Night, his next short, was the first film from Pakistan to be selected at Clermont-Ferrand International Short Film Festival.

His films typically centre on characters who are struggling against their status as outsiders in Pakistan's conservative religious society, such as women, people with physical or intellectual disabilities, LGBT people or members of religious minority groups.

=== In Flames ===
Kahn's feature film directorial debut, In Flames, premiered at the 2023 Cannes Film Festival, and was Pakistan's official submission for Best International Feature Film at the 96th Academy Awards in 2024.

In Flames was the winner of the John Dunning Best First Feature Award at the 12th Canadian Screen Awards in 2024.

== Filmography ==
=== Short films ===
- Dia, 2018
- 1978, 2020
- Stray Dogs Come Out at Night, 2020
- Brothers (Bhai), 2021
- The Lion Does Not Concern Himself, 2026

=== Feature films ===
- In Flames, 2023
