= Trailer of the Film That Will Never Exist: "Phony Wars" =

- The film's opening title card.
- Film Annonce du Film qui n'existera Jamais: "Drôles de Guerres"
- Directed by: Jean-Luc Godard
- Written by: Fabrice Aragno; Nicole Brenez; Jean-Paul Battaggia
- Starring: Jean-Luc Godard
- Cinematography: Fabrice Aragno
- Production companies: Saint Laurent Productions; Vixens; L'Atelier
- Release date: May 21, 2023 (Cannes)
- Running time: 20 min
- Countries: France; Switzerland
- Language: French

Trailer of the Film That Will Never Exist: "Phony Wars" (French: Film Annonce du Film qui n'existera Jamais: "Drôles de Guerres") is a 2023 French-Swiss avant-garde essay short film directed by Jean-Luc Godard and written by Fabrice Aragno, Nicole Brenez and Jean-Paul Battaggia. It was the first project released after Godard's death.

The short film had its world premiere at the "Cannes Classics" section of the 2023 Cannes Film Festival, alongside a 4K restoration of Le Mépris (1963), as a tribute to the filmmaker.

== Plot ==
"Rejecting the billions of alphabetic diktats to liberate the incessant metamorphoses and metaphors of a necessary and true language by re-turning to the locations of past film shoots, while keeping track of modern times."

== Release ==
The short film had its world premiere at the "Cannes Classics" section of the 2023 Cannes Film Festival, alongside a 4K restoration of Le Mépris (1963) and the French documentary Godard by Godard (2023), as a tribute to the filmmaker.
