= Aunque es de noche =

Spanish short film

- Directed by: Guillermo García López
- Written by: Guillermo García López, Inbar Horesh
- Produced by: Marina García López, David Casas Riesco, Pablo De la chica, Justin Pechberty, Damien Megherbi
- Edited by: Victoria Lammers
- Distributed by: Les Valseurs, Marvin & Wayne
- Release date: May 2023
- Running time: 15 minutes
- Countries: Spain, France

Aunque es de noche (Even though it's night) is a 2023 Spanish and French short film directed by Guillermo García López shot in 16mm which premiered at the 2023 Cannes Film Festival in official competition. Filmed in Cañada Real, Europe's largest slum, the film follows two teenagers, Toni & Nasser, before one of them has to leave the place forever.

In February 2024, Aunque es de noche received the Goya award for Best Fiction short.

== Plot ==
La Cañada Real, Europe's largest slum on the outskirts of Madrid, has been without electricity for over a year. In the firelight, Toni, a 13 year-old boy, discovers that his best friend Nasser is leaving forever. Amongst Roma legends of a possible future, Toni looks for a way to stay connected to him.

== Reception ==
Aunque es de noche made its world debut at the 2023 Cannes Film Festival Official competition and has since received positive reviews. Miriam Voigt described it in TalkingShorts as a "coming of age (which) becomes a metaphysical quest for reassurance", while Closeupculture cites it as their 7th best short film of 2023.

In their review of Cannes 2023 short film competition, Laurence Boyce highlighted in Cineuropa "the rawness and despair (of the film), balanced out by a vein of genuine tenderness in this evocation of friendship and the need to escape", whereas Marina Richter said Aunque es de noche "leaves a deep impression on viewers with its richness of imagery, authentic dialogues and life-near situations".

Since its world premiere, the film has been selected in over 75 festivals and academies around the world, including:

Year	Festivals	Award/Category	Status
2023	Cannes Film Festival	Palme d'Or - Best Short Film	Nominated
2023	San Sebastian International Film Festival	Zabalteigi-Tabakalera	Nominated
2023	Abycine	Best Short Film	Won
2024
2024	Goya Awards	Best Fiction Short	Won
2024	Vienna Shorts	Best International Short	Nominated
2024	Go Short	Best International Short	Nominated
2024	HollyShorts	Best International Film	Nominated
2024	In the Palace Film Festival	Special Mention for Best International Short	Won

== Sleepless City ==
A feature adapted from the short, currently titled Ciudad sin Sueño (Sleepless City) and also directed by Guillermo García López, is currently in preparation and is scheduled to be released in 2025.
