= Nans Laborde-Jourdàa =

Nans Laborde-Jourdàa (born 26 November 1986 in Oloron-Sainte-Marie) is a French actor and filmmaker from Oloron-Sainte-Marie, Pyrénées-Atlantiques. His short film Boléro premiered in the Critics' Week program at the 2023 Cannes Film Festival, where it was the winner of the Queer Palm for Best Short Film, the Leitz Cine Discovery Prize for Short Film, and the Canal+ Award for Short Film.

He previously directed the short films Looking for Reiko in 2017 and Leo by Night (Léo la nuit) in 2021.

He is out as gay.

== Filmography ==
=== Actor ===
Year	Title	Role	Notes
2008	The Beautiful Person (La Belle Personne)		
2009	Pardon My French (Un chat un chat)	Anaîs's lover	
2010	Hidden Diary (Mères et filles)	Pierre	
2011	His Mother's Eyes (Les yeux de sa mère)	Director JT	
2013	Just a Fan	Him	
2015	Girl with a Backpack	Backpacking man	
2016	Joan the Pope (La papesse Jeanne)	Companion 2	
2016	Creuse, le film		
2017	C'est pas une histoire d'amour	Evan	
2021	Leo by Night (Léo la nuit)	Paul	
2021	Son Altesse Protocole	Karl	
2023	Sleepless Nights (Nuits blanches)	Nans	
2023	La femme de 8h47		

=== Director ===
Year	Title	Notes
2017	Looking for Reiko	Documentary
2021	Leo by Night (Léo la nuit)	Also writer
2023	Boléro	Also writer
