= Légua =

- Cannes release poster
- Directed by: João Miller Guerra; Filipa Reis
- Written by: João Miller Guerra; Filipa Reis; Sara Morais; José Filipe Costa; Letícia Simões
- Produced by: Rachel Daisy Ellis; Filipa Reis
- Starring: Carla Maciel; Fátima Soares
- Cinematography: Vasco Viana
- Edited by: Luisa Homem
- Music by: Ricardo Jacinto; HypoGeo
- Production companies: KG Productions; Laranja Azul; Stayblack Productions; Uma Pedra no Sapato
- Distributed by: Luxbox
- Release dates: May 23, 2023 (Cannes); June 29, 2023 (Portugal)
- Running time: 119 minutes
- Countries: Portugal; France; Italy
- Language: Portuguese

Légua (lit. 'League') is a 2023 drama film directed by João Miller Guerra & Filipa Reis who co-wrote with Sara Morais, José Filipe Costa and Letícia Simões. It stars Carla Maciel and Fátima Soares accompanied by Vitória Nogueira da Silva, Sara Machado, Paulo Calatré and Manuel Mozos. It is a co-production between Portugal, France and Italy.

Légua had its world premiere on May 23, 2023, at Directors' Fortnight at the 76th Cannes Film Festival,

== Synopsis ==
The 70-year-old Emilia has been taking care of Casa da Botica, a house in the rural village of Légua, in the north of Portugal, for more than 4 decades. In this old house, Ana helps her friend Emilia, the elderly caretaker, determined to maintain order in this house uninhabited by its absent owners. As the seasons pass, Monica, Ana's daughter, questions her mother's decisions, and the three generations of women try to understand their place in a rapidly fading world, where the cycle of life is only renewed every time through inevitable endings.

== Cast ==
- Carla Maciel as Ana
- Fátima Soares as Emilia
- Vitória Nogueira da Silva as Mónica
- Sara Machado as Sofia
- Paulo Calatré as Victor
- Manuel Mozos as Guilherme

== Release ==
Légua had its world premiere on May 23, 2023, at the 76th Cannes Film Festival, then was released commercially on June 29, 2023, in Portuguese theaters.

== Reception ==
On the review aggregator website Rotten Tomatoes, 86% of 7 critics' reviews are positive, with an average rating of 5.6/10.
