= Fár =

2023 Icelandic short film

- Cannes Film Festival poster
- English: Intrusion
- Directed by: Gunnur Martinsdóttir Schlüter
- Screenplay by: Gunnur Martinsdóttir Schlüter; Anní Ólafsdóttir
- Produced by: Rúnar Ingi Einarsson; Sara Nassim
- Starring: Gunnur Martinsdóttir Schlüter
- Cinematography: Eli Arenson
- Edited by: Brúsi Ólason; Guðlaugur Andri Eyþórsson
- Production company: Norður
- Release date: 6 May 2023 (Cannes)
- Running time: 5 minutes
- Country: Iceland
- Language: Icelandic

Fár (sometimes translated as English: Intrusion) is a 2023 Icelandic short film directed by Gunnur Martinsdóttir Schlüter. At the 2023 Cannes Film Festival, Fár was nominated for Short Film Palme d'Or and won the Special Mention.
