= 2023 Cannes Film Festival =

- Official poster of the 76th Cannes Film Festival featuring actress Catherine Deneuve during the shooting of La Chamade (1968)
- Opening film: Jeanne du Barry
- Closing film: Elemental
- Location: Cannes, France
- Founded: 1946
- Awards: Palme d'Or: Anatomy of a Fall
- Artistic director: Thierry Frémaux
- No. of films: 21 (In Competition)
- Festival date: 16–27 May 2023
- Website: festival-cannes.com/en

Cannes Film Festival
- 2024 2022

The 76th annual Cannes Film Festival took place from 16 to 27 May 2023. Swedish filmmaker Ruben Östlund served as jury president. With the French film Anatomy of a Fall winning the Palme d'Or, the festival's top prize, Justine Triet became the third female director to achieve the prize, after Jane Campion in 1993, and Julia Ducournau in 2021.

The official poster for the festival featuring actress Catherine Deneuve was created by Lionel Avignon and Stefan de Vivies of the design studio Hartland Villa from a photo taken by Jack Garofalo during the shooting of La Chamade (1968). The poster was chosen to pay tribute to Deneuve for her contributions to film.

During the festival, two Honorary Palme d'Or were awarded: the first one during the opening ceremony for Michael Douglas, and the second one was awarded on short notice for Harrison Ford before the world premiere of Indiana Jones and the Dial of Destiny.

The festival opened with Jeanne du Barry by Maïwenn and closed with Pixar's Elemental by Peter Sohn.

== Juries ==
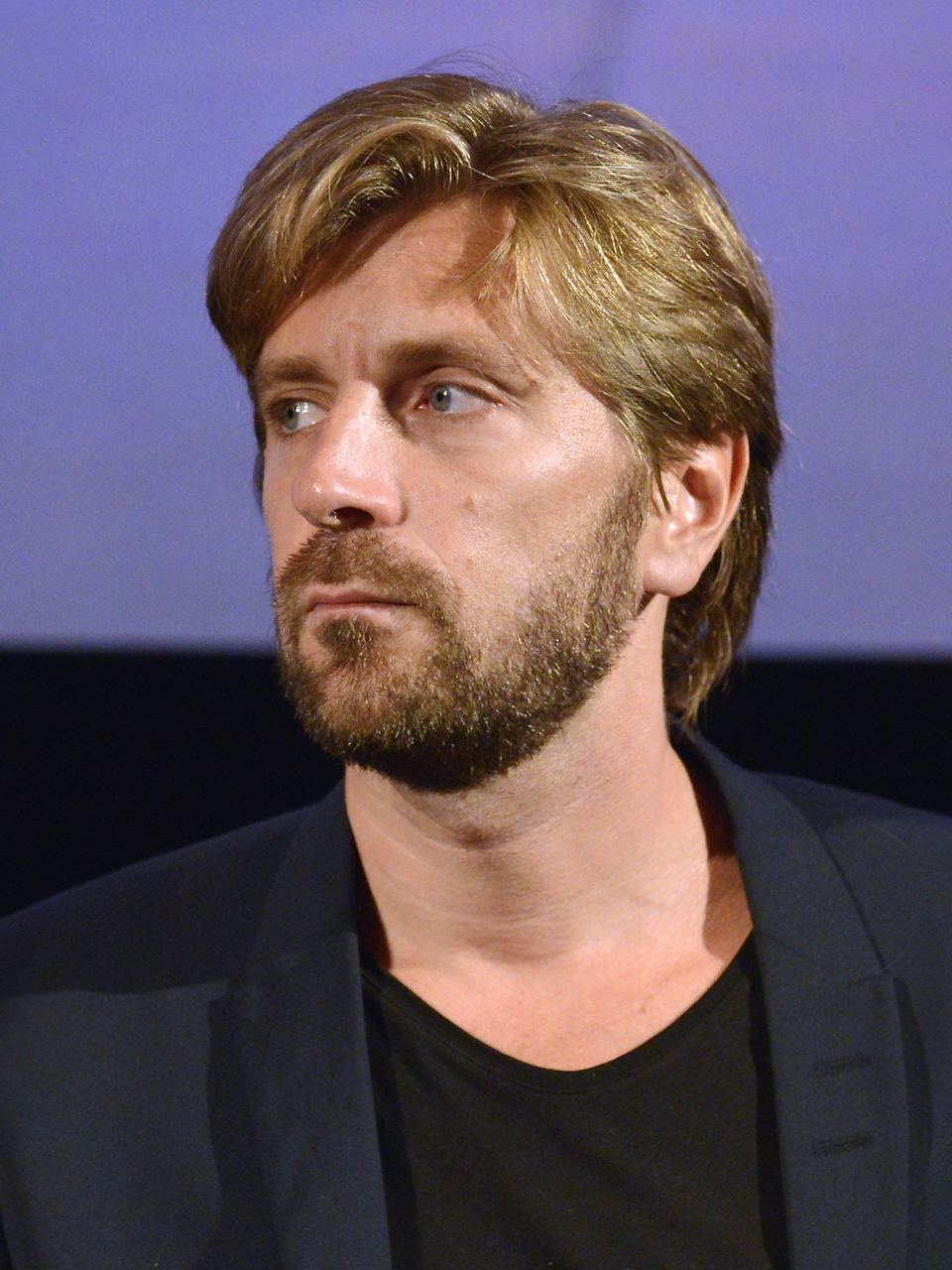
Ruben Östlund, Main Competition Jury President

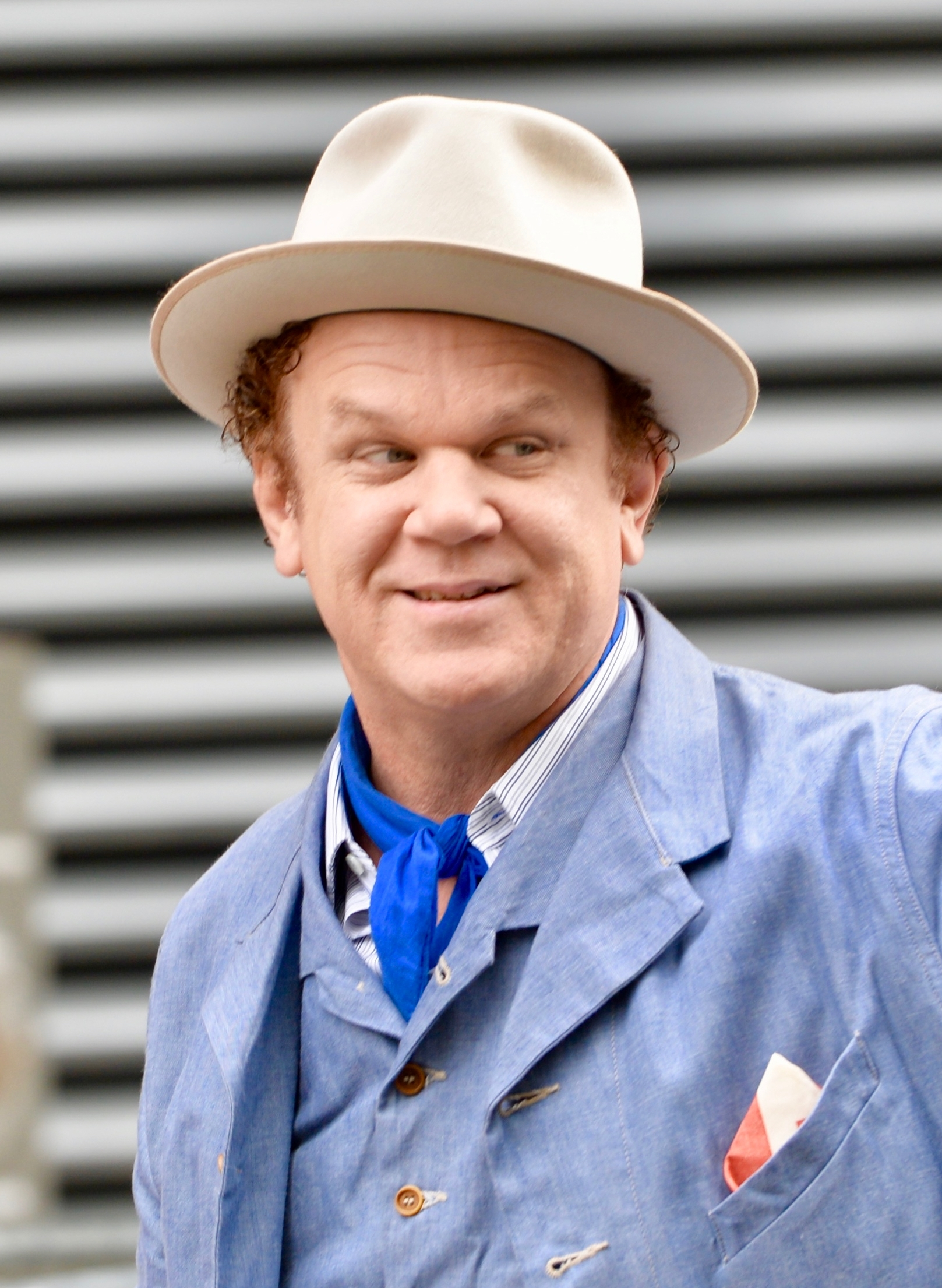
John C. Reilly, Un Certain Regard Jury President

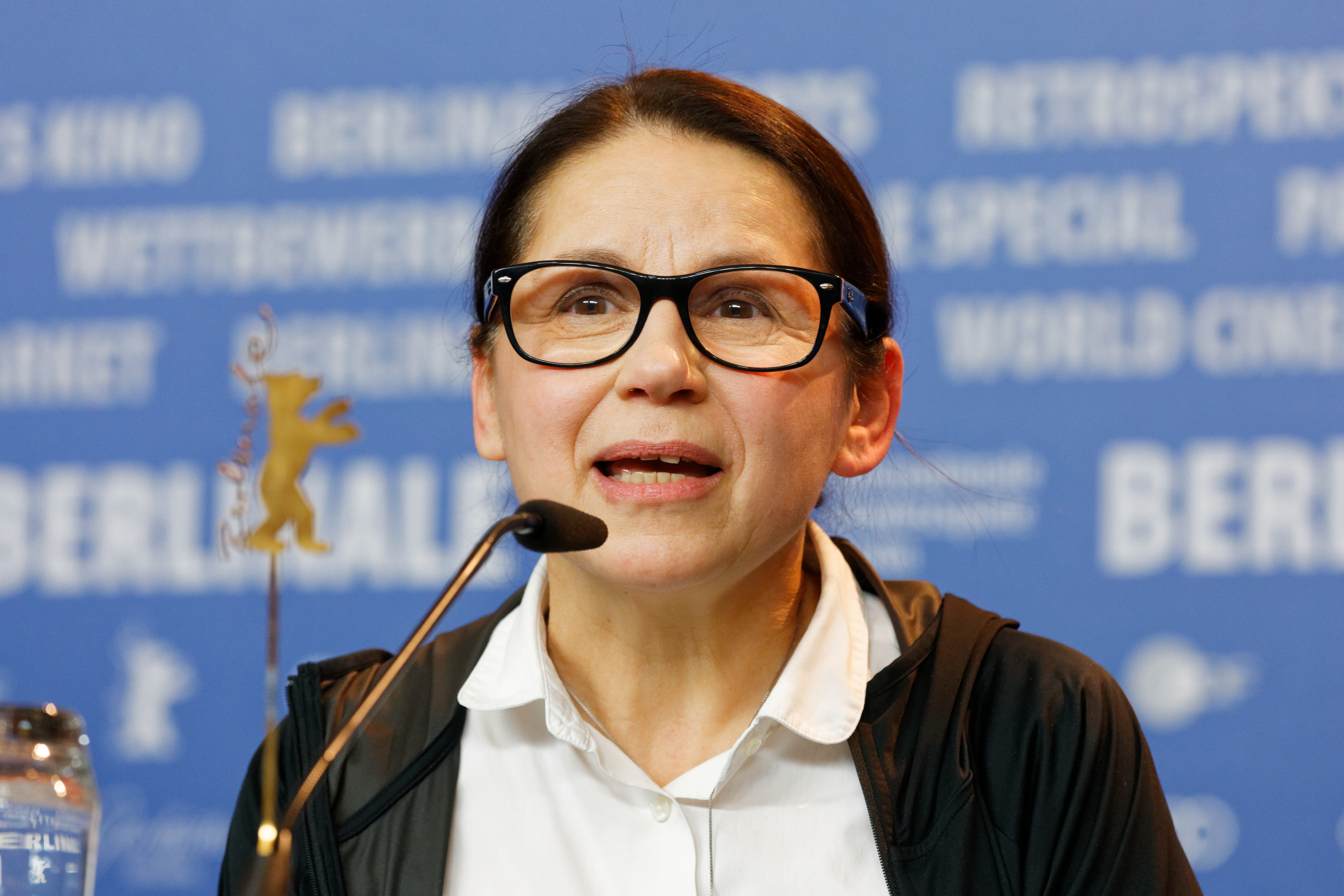
Ildikó Enyedi, Cinéfoundation and Short Films Competition Jury President

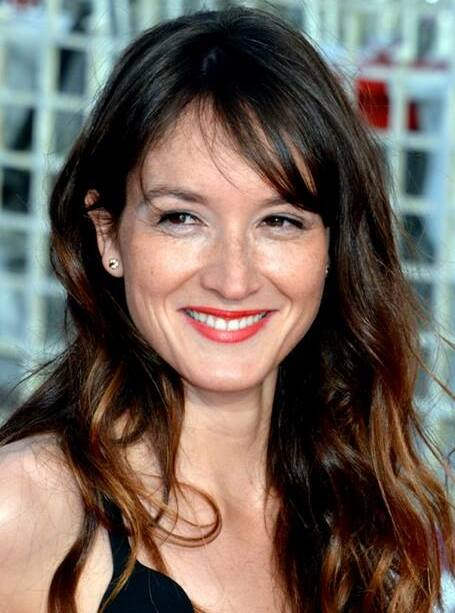
Anaïs Demoustier, Caméra d'Or Jury President

=== Main competition ===
- Ruben Östlund, Swedish filmmaker – Jury President
- Paul Dano, American actor and director
- Julia Ducournau, French filmmaker
- Brie Larson, American actress and director
- Denis Ménochet, French actor
- Rungano Nyoni, Zambian-Welsh filmmaker
- Atiq Rahimi, Afghan director and writer
- Damián Szifrón, Argentinian filmmaker
- Maryam Touzani, Moroccan filmmaker and actress

=== Un Certain Regard ===
- John C. Reilly, American actor, screenwriter and producer – Jury President
- Paula Beer, German actress
- Davy Chou, Cambodian-French filmmaker
- Émilie Dequenne, Belgian actress
- Alice Winocour, French filmmaker

=== Caméra d'Or ===
- Anaïs Demoustier, French actress – Jury President
- Mickaël Buch, French director and screenwriter
- Nathalie Durand, French director of photography
- Sophie Frilley, French general director of Titrafilm
- Nicolas Marcadé, French journalist and critic
- Raphaël Personnaz, French actor

=== Cinéfondation and Short Films Competition ===
- Ildikó Enyedi, Hungarian filmmaker – Jury President
- Ana Lily Amirpour, American filmmaker
- Shlomi Elkabetz, Israeli actor, director, screenwriter and producer
- Charlotte Le Bon, Canadian actor and director
- Karidja Touré, French actress

=== Critics' Week ===
- Audrey Diwan, French filmmaker – Jury President
- Rui Poças, Portuguese cinematographer
- Franz Rogowski, German actor
- Meenakshi Shedde, Indian journalist and programmer of the Berlin International Film Festival
- Kim Yutani, programming director of the Sundance Film Festival

=== Queer Palm ===
- John Cameron Mitchell, American actor, filmmaker, producer, singer and songwriter – Jury President
- Louise Chevillotte, French actress
- Zeno Graton, Belgian director
- Isabel Sandoval, Filipina filmmaker and actress
- Cédric Succivalli, French journalist, film critic and festival programmer

=== L'Œil d'or ===
- Kirsten Johnson, American filmmaker and cinematographer – Jury President
- Sophie Faucher, Canadian actress
- Ovidie, French actress, director and author
- Pedro Pimenta, Mozambican producer
- Jean-Claude Raspiengeas, French journalist and critic

== Official selection ==
=== In Competition ===
The following films were selected to compete for the Palme d'Or:

English Title	Original Title	Director(s)	Production Country
About Dry Grasses	Kuru Otlar Üstüne	Nuri Bilge Ceylan	Turkey, France, Germany
Anatomy of a Fall (QP)	Anatomie d'une chute	Justine Triet	France
Asphalt City	Black Flies	Jean-Stéphane Sauvaire	United States
Asteroid City		Wes Anderson	United States
Banel & Adama (CdO)	Banel et Adama	Ramata-Toulaye Sy	Senegal, Mali, France
A Brighter Tomorrow	Il sol dell'avvenire	Nanni Moretti	Italy, France
La chimera		Alice Rohrwacher	Italy, France, Switzerland
Club Zero		Jessica Hausner	Austria, Denmark, France, Germany, United Kingdom, Qatar
Fallen Leaves	Kuolleet lehdet	Aki Kaurismäki	Finland, Germany
Firebrand		Karim Aïnouz	United Kingdom
Four Daughters (ŒdO)	بنات ألفة	Kaouther Ben Hania	Tunisia, France, Germany, Saudi Arabia
Homecoming (QP)	Le Retour	Catherine Corsini	France
Kidnapped	Rapito	Marco Bellocchio	Italy, France, Germany
Last Summer	L'été dernier	Catherine Breillat	France
May December		Todd Haynes	United States
Monster (QP)	怪物	Hirokazu Kore-eda	Japan
The Old Oak		Ken Loach	United Kingdom, France, Belgium
Perfect Days		Wim Wenders	Japan, Germany
The Taste of Things	La Passion de Dodin Bouffant	Tran Anh Hung	France
Youth (Spring) (ŒdO)	青春	Wang Bing	China, France, Luxembourg, Netherlands
The Zone of Interest		Jonathan Glazer	United Kingdom, United States, Poland

(CdO) indicates film eligible for the Caméra d'Or as a feature directorial debut.
(ŒdO) indicates film eligible for the L'Œil d'or as documentary.
(QP) indicates film in competition for the Queer Palm.

=== Un Certain Regard ===
The following films were selected to compete in the Un Certain Regard section:

English Title	Original Title	Director(s)	Production Country
All to Play For (CdO)	Rien à perdre	Delphine Deloget	France, Belgium
The Animal Kingdom (opening film)	Le Règne animal	Thomas Cailley	France, Belgium
The Breaking Ice	燃冬	Anthony Chen	China, Singapore
The Buriti Flower	Crowrã / A Flor do Buriti	João Salaviza and Renée Nader Messora	Brazil, Portugal
The Delinquents	Los delincuentes	Rodrigo Moreno	Argentina, Brazil, Chile, Luxembourg
Goodbye Julia (CdO)	وداعا جوليا	Mohamed Kordofani	Sudan, Egypt, Germany, France, Sweden, Saudi Arabia
Hopeless (CdO)	화란	Kim Chang-hoon	South Korea
Hounds (CdO)	Les Meutes	Kamal Lazraq	Morocco, France, Belgium, Qatar, Saudi Arabia
How to Have Sex (CdO) (QP)		Molly Manning Walker	United Kingdom
If Only I Could Hibernate (CdO)		Zoljargal Purevdash	Mongolia, France, Switzerland, Qatar
The Mother of All Lies (ŒdO)	كذب أبيض	Asmae El Moudir	Morocco, Qatar, Egypt, Saudi Arabia
The Nature of Love (QP)	Simple comme Sylvain	Monia Chokri	Canada, France
The New Boy		Warwick Thornton	Australia
Omen (CdO)	Augure	Baloji	Belgium, Democratic Republic of the Congo
Only the River Flows	河边的错误	Wei Shujun	China
Rosalie (QP)		Stéphanie Di Giusto	France, Belgium
Salem		Jean-Bernard Marlin	France
The Settlers (CdO)	Los colonos	Felipe Gálvez Haberle	Chile, Argentina, France, Denmark, United Kingdom, Taiwan, Sweden, Germany
Terrestrial Verses	آیه‌های زمینی	Ali Asgari and Alireza Khatami	Iran
Out of Competition
Strangers by Night (closing film)	Une Nuit	Alex Lutz	France, Belgium

(CdO) indicates film eligible for the Caméra d'Or as a feature directorial debut.
(ŒdO) indicates film eligible for the L'Œil d'or as documentary.
(QP) indicates film in competition for the Queer Palm.

=== Out of Competition ===
The following films were selected to be screened out of competition:

English Title	Original Title	Director(s)	Production Country
Abbé Pierre – A Century of Devotion	L'Abbé Pierre – Une Vie de Combats	Frédéric Tellier	France
Cobweb	거미집	Kim Jee-woon	South Korea
Elemental (closing film)		Peter Sohn	United States
Indiana Jones and the Dial of Destiny		James Mangold	United States
Jeanne du Barry (opening film)		Maïwenn	France, Belgium, United Kingdom
Killers of the Flower Moon		Martin Scorsese	United States
Series
The Idol (episodes 1 and 2) (QP)		Sam Levinson	United States
Midnight screenings
Acid	Acide	Just Philippot	France
Hypnotic		Robert Rodriguez	United States
Kennedy		Anurag Kashyap	India
The King of Algiers	Omar La Fraise	Elias Belkeddar	France
Project Silence	탈출: 프로젝트 사일런스	Kim Tae-gon	South Korea

(QP) indicates film in competition for the Queer Palm.

=== Cannes Premiere ===
The following films were selected to be screened in the Cannes Premiere section:

English Title	Original Title	Director(s)	Production Country
Along Came Love (QP)	Le Temps d'aimer	Katell Quillévéré	France, Belgium
Bonnard, Pierre and Marthe	Bonnard, Pierre et Marthe	Martin Provost	France
Close Your Eyes	Cerrar los ojos	Víctor Erice	Spain, Argentina
Eureka		Lisandro Alonso	France, Germany, Portugal, Mexico, Argentina
Just the Two of Us	L'Amour et Les Forêts	Valérie Donzelli	France
Kubi (QP)	首	Takeshi Kitano	Japan
Lost in the Night	Perdidos en la noche	Amat Escalante	Mexico, Germany, Netherlands, Denmark

(QP) indicates film in competition for the Queer Palm.

=== Special Screenings ===
The following films were selected to be screened in the Special Screenings section:

English Title	Original Title	Director(s)	Production Country
Anselm (ŒdO)		Wim Wenders	Germany
Bread and Roses (ŒdO)		Sahra Mani	Afghanistan, United States
The Daughters of Fire (short)	As Filhas do Fogo	Pedro Costa	Portugal
Little Girl Blue (ŒdO)		Mona Achache	France, Belgium
Man in Black (ŒdO)		Wang Bing	China, France, United States, United Kingdom
Marguerite's Theorem	Le Théorème de Marguerite	Anna Novion	France, Switzerland
Occupied City (ŒdO)		Steve McQueen	United States, United Kingdom, Netherlands
Pictures of Ghosts (ŒdO)	Retratos Fantasmas	Kleber Mendonça Filho	Brazil
Robot Dreams		Pablo Berger	Spain, France
Strange Way of Life (short) (QP)	Extraña Forma de Vida	Pedro Almodóvar	Spain

(ŒdO) indicates film eligible for the L'Œil d'or as documentary.

(QP) indicates film in competition for the Queer Palm.

=== Short Films Competition ===
Out of 4,288 entries, the following films were selected to compete for the Short Film Palme d'Or:

English Title	Original Title	Director(s)	Production Country
27 (QP)		Flóra Anna Buda	France, Hungary
As It Was		Anastasia Solonevych and Damian Kocur	Poland, Ukraine
Aunque es de Noche		Guillermo García López	Spain, France
Basri & Salma in a Never-Ending Comedy	Basri & Salma Dalam Komedi Yang Terus Berputar	Khozy Rizal	Indonesia, United States
Intrusion	Fár	Gunnur Martinsdóttir Schlüter	Iceland
La Perra		Carla Melo Gampert	Colombia, France
None of That	Nada de Todo Esto	Patricio Martínez and Francisco Canton	Argentina, Spain, United States
Peeping Mom	Le Sexe de Ma Mère	Francis Canitrot	France
Poof		Margaret Miller	United States
Tits		Eivind Landsvik	Norway
Wild Summon		Karni Arieli and Saul Freed	United Kingdom

(QP) indicates film in competition for the Queer Palm.

=== Cinéfondation ===
The Cinéfondation section focuses on films made by students at film schools. The Cannes Film Festival allocates a €15,000 grant for the winner of the First Prize, €11,250 for the winner of the Second Prize and €7,500 for the winner of the Third Prize. The following 16 entries (14 live-action and 2 animated films) were selected out of 2,000 submissions:

English Title	Original Title	Director(s)	School
A Bright Sunny Day		Yupeng He	Columbia University, United States
The Call of the Brook	Al Toraa'	Jad Chahine	High Cinema Institute, Egypt
Crack of Dawn	Trenc d'Alba	Anna Llargués	ESCAC, Spain
Eighth Day	Osmý Den	Petr Pylypčuk	FAMU, Czech Republic
Electra		Daria Kashcheeva	FAMU, Czech Republic
Ground	Solos	Pedro Vargas	FAAP, Brazil
Hole	구멍	Hwang Hyein	Korean Academy of Film Arts, South Korea
Imogene		Katie Blair	Columbia University, United States
Inside the Skin (QP)	Daroone Poust	Shafagh Abosaba and Maryam Mahdiye	Karnameh Film School, Iran
Killing Boris Johnson		Musa Alderson-Clarke	NFTS, United Kingdom
The Lee Families	이씨 가문의 형제들	Seo Jeong-mi	Korea National University of Arts, South Korea
Moon	Ayyur	Zineb Wakrim	ÉSAV Marrakech, Morocco
Nehemich		Yudhajit Basu	FTII, India
Norwegian Offspring		Marlene Emilie Lyngstad	Den Danske Filmskole, Denmark
Primitive Times	Uhrmenschen	Yu Hao	Filmuniversität Babelsberg, Germany
The Voice of Others	La Voix des Autres	Fatima Kaci	La Fémis, France

(QP) indicates film in competition for the Queer Palm.

=== Cannes Classics ===
The following films were selected to be screened in the Cannes Classics section:

English Title	Original Title	Director(s)	Production Country
Restored prints
L'Amour fou (1969)		Jacques Rivette	France
Caligula – The Ultimate Cut (1979)		Tinto Brass	United States, Italy
Ces Messieurs de la santé (1934)		Pierre Colombier	France
The Chosen One (1990)	Ishanou	Aribam Syam Sharma	India
Danger Ahead (1960)	Classe tous risques	Claude Sautet	France, Italy
Hello, That's Me! (1966)	Բարև, ես եմ	Frunze Dovlatyan	Soviet Union
It (1966)	Es	Ulrich Schamoni	West Germany
The Lady from Constantinople (1969)	Sziget a szárazföldön	Judit Elek	Hungary
Love, Women and Flowers (1984)	Amor, mujeres y flores	Marta Rodríguez	Colombia
Man on Pink Corner (1962)	Hombre de la esquina rosada	René Mugica	Argentina
Mississippi Blues (1983)		Bertrand Tavernier and Robert Parrish	France
The Munekata Sisters (1950)	宗方姉妹	Yasujirō Ozu	Japan
The Railroad Man (1956)	Il ferroviere	Pietro Germi	Italy
Record of a Tenement Gentleman (1947)	長屋紳士録	Yasujirō Ozu	Japan
Le Rendez-vous des quais (1955)		Paul Carpita	France
Return to Reason (1923)	Le Retour à la Raison	Man Ray	France
Skeleton of Mrs. Morales (1960)	El Esqueleto de la señora Morales	Rogelio A. González	Mexico
The Village (1953)	Sie fanden eine Heimat	Leopold Lindtberg	Switzerland
The Film Foundation Restoration
Spellbound (1945)		Alfred Hitchcock	United States
Tribute to Jean-Luc Godard
Godard by Godard (ŒdO)	Godard par Godard	Florence Platarets	France
Contempt (1963)	Le Mépris	Jean-Luc Godard	France
Trailer of the Film That Will Never Exist: "Phony Wars"	Film Annonce du Film qui n’existera Jamais: “Drôles de Guerres”	Jean-Luc Godard	France, Switzerland
Tribute
The Family (ŒdO)	La Saga Rassam-Berri, le cinéma dans les veines	Michel Denisot and Florent Maillet	France
Liv Ullmann – A Road Less Travelled (ŒdO)		Dheeraj Akolkar	Norway
Documentaries about Cinema
100 Years of Warner Bros. (4 episodes)		Leslie Iwerks	United States
Anita (ŒdO)		Svetlana Zill and Alexis Bloom	United States
Michael Douglas, The Prodigal Son	Michael Douglas, le fils prodige	Amine Mestari	France
Nelson Pereira dos Santos – A Life of Cinema (ŒdO)	Nelson Pereira dos Santos – Vida de Cinema	Aida Marques and Ivelise Ferreira	Brazil
Room 999 (ŒdO)	Chambre 999	Lubna Playoust	France
Viva Varda! (ŒdO)		Pierre-Henri Gibert	France

(ŒdO) film eligible for the L'Œil d'or as documentary.

=== Cinéma de la Plage ===
The following films were selected to be screened in the "Cinéma de la Plage" section:

English Title	Original Title	Director(s)	Production Country
Carmen (1983)		Carlos Saura	Spain
Flo		Géraldine Danon	France
One Deadly Summer (1983)	L'Été meurtrier	Jean Becker	France
Mars Express		Jérémie Périn	France
Sarafina! (1992)		Darrell Roodt	United States, South Africa, United Kingdom, France
Thelma & Louise (1991)		Ridley Scott	United States
Underground (1995)	Подземље	Emir Kusturica	Yugoslavia, Bulgaria, Czech Republic, France, Germany, Hungary
Restored Prints
Alberto Express (1990)		Arthur Joffé	France
Badlands (1973)		Terrence Malick	United States
C'est la vie! (2017)	Le Sens de la fête	Éric Toledano and Olivier Nakache	France
Summer on a Gentle Slope (1987)	L'été en pente douce	Gérard Krawczyk	France
The Way of the Dragon (1972)	猛龍過江	Bruce Lee	Hong Kong

== Parallel sections ==
=== Critics' Week ===
The following films were selected to be screened in main competition of the Critics' Week (Semaine de la critique):

English Title	Original Title	Director(s)	Production Country
In Competition
It's Raining in the House (CdO)	Il pleut dans la maison	Paloma Sermon-Daï	Belgium, France
Inshallah a Boy (CdO)		Amjad Al Rasheed	Jordan, Saudi Arabia, Qatar, France
Lost Country		Vladimir Perišić	France, Serbia, Luxembourg, Croatia
Power Alley (CdO) (QP)	Levante	Lillah Halla	Brazil, France, Uruguay
The Rapture (CdO)	Le Ravissement	Iris Kaltenbäck	France
Sleep (CdO)	잠	Jason Yu	South Korea
Tiger Stripes (CdO)		Amanda Nell Eu	Malaysia, Taiwan, Singapore, France, Germany, Netherlands, Indonesia, Qatar
Short Films Competition
Arkhé		Armando Navarro	Mexico
Boléro (QP)		Nans Laborde-Jourdàa	France
Contadores		Irati Gorostidi Agirretxe	Spain
Crocodile	Krokodyl	Dawid Bodzak	Poland
I Promise You Paradise		Morad Mostafa	Egypt, France, Qatar
The Purple Season	La Saison Pourpre	Clémence Bouchereau	France
The Real Truth about the Fight	Prava istina priče o šori	Andrea Slaviček	Croatia, Spain
Shimmering Bodies	Corpos Cintilantes	Inês Teixeira	Portugal
Via Dolorosa		Rachel Gutgarts	France
Walking With Her into the Night		Hui Shu	China
Special Screenings
Àma Gloria (opening film)		Marie Amachoukeli	France
The Experience of Love	Le Syndrome des amour passés	Ann Sirot and Raphaël Balboni	Belgium, France
Midnight Skin		Manolis Mavris	Greece, France
No Love Lost (closing film)	La Fille de son père	Erwan Le Duc	France
Pleure pas Gabriel		Mathilde Chavanne	France
Stranger (QP)		Jehnny Beth and Iris Chassaigne	France
Vincent Must Die (CdO)	Vincent doit mourir	Stéphan Castang	France

(CdO) indicates film eligible for the Caméra d'Or as a feature directorial debut.
(QP) indicates film in competition for the Queer Palm.

=== Directors' Fortnight ===
The following films were selected to be screened in the Directors' Fortnight (Quinzaine des cinéastes) section:

English Title	Original Title	Director(s)	Production Country
In Competition
Agra		Kanu Behl	India
Blackbird Blackbird Blackberry		Elene Naveriani	Switzerland, Germany, Georgia
The Book of Solutions	Le Livre des solutions	Michel Gondry	France
Creatura		Elena Martín Gimeno	Spain
Déserts		Faouzi Bensaïdi	Morocco, France, Germany, Belgium
The Feeling That the Time for Doing Something Has Passed (CdO)		Joanna Arnow	United States
The Goldman Case	Le Procès Goldman	Cédric Kahn	France
Grace (CdO)	Blazh	Ilya Povolotsky	Russia
In Flames		Zarrar Kahn	Canada, Pakistan
In Our Day	우리의 하루	Hong Sang-soo	South Korea
Inside the Yellow Cocoon Shell (CdO)	Bên trong vỏ kén vàng	Pham Thien An	Vietnam, Singapore, France, Spain
Légua		Filipa Reis and João Miller Guerra	Portugal, France, Italy
Mambar Pierrette		Rosine Mbakam	Cameroon
The Other Laurens	L'autre Laurens	Claude Schmitz	France
A Prince (QP)	Un prince	Pierre Creton	France
Riddle of Fire (CdO)		Weston Razooli	United States
She Is Conann (QP)	Conann	Bertrand Mandico	Belgium, France, Luxembourg
A Song Sung Blue (CdO) (QP)	小白船	Geng Zihan	China
The Sweet East (CdO)		Sean Price Williams	United States
Short Films
A Storm Inside	Dans la tête un orage	Clément Pérot	France
The Birthday Party	L'anniversaire D'Enrico	Francesco Sossai	Germany, France, Italy
The House is on Fire, Might as Well Get Warm	La Maison Brûle, Autant se Réchauffer	Mouloud Aït Liotna	France
I Saw the Face of the Devil (QP)	J'ai vu le visage du diable	Julia Kowalski	France
Lemon Tree		Rachel Walden	United States
Margarethe 89		Lucas Malbrun	France
Mast-del (QP)		Maryam Tafakory	Iran
Oyu		Atsushi Hirai	France, Japan
The Red Sea Makes me Wanna Cry		Faris Alrjoob	Germany
Talking to the River		Yue Pan	United Kingdom, China
Special Screening
Abraham's Valley (1993)	Vale Abraão	Manoel de Oliveira	Portugal, France, Switzerland
Quentin Tarantino's Surprise Special Screening
Rolling Thunder (1977)		John Flynn	United States

(CdO) indicates film eligible for the Caméra d'Or as a feature directorial debut.
(QP) indicates film in competition for the Queer Palm.

=== ACID ===
The following films were selected to be screened in the ACID (Association for the Distribution of Independent Cinema) section:

English Title	Original Title	Director(s)	Production Country
Caiti Blues		Justine Harbonnier	France, Canada
Chicken for Linda!	Linda veut du poulet!	Chiara Malta and Sébastien Laudenbach	France, Italy
Dreaming in Between		Ryûtarô Ninomiya	Japan
In the Rearview	Skąd dokąd	Maciek Hamela	Poland, France, Ukraine
Laissez-moi		Maxime Rappaz	Switzerland, France, Belgium
Machtat		Sonia Ben Slama	Tunisia, Lebanon, France, Qatar
Nome		Sana Na N'hada	Guinea-Bissau, France, Portugal, Angola
On the Edge		Nicolas Peduzzi	France
The Sea and its Waves	La Mer et ses vagues	Liana & Renaud	France, Lebanon

== Official awards ==
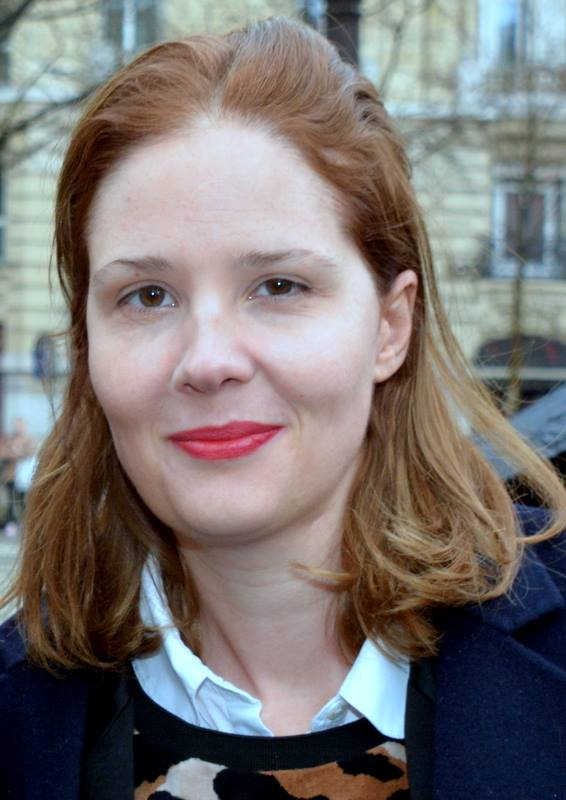
Justine Triet, Palme d'Or winner.

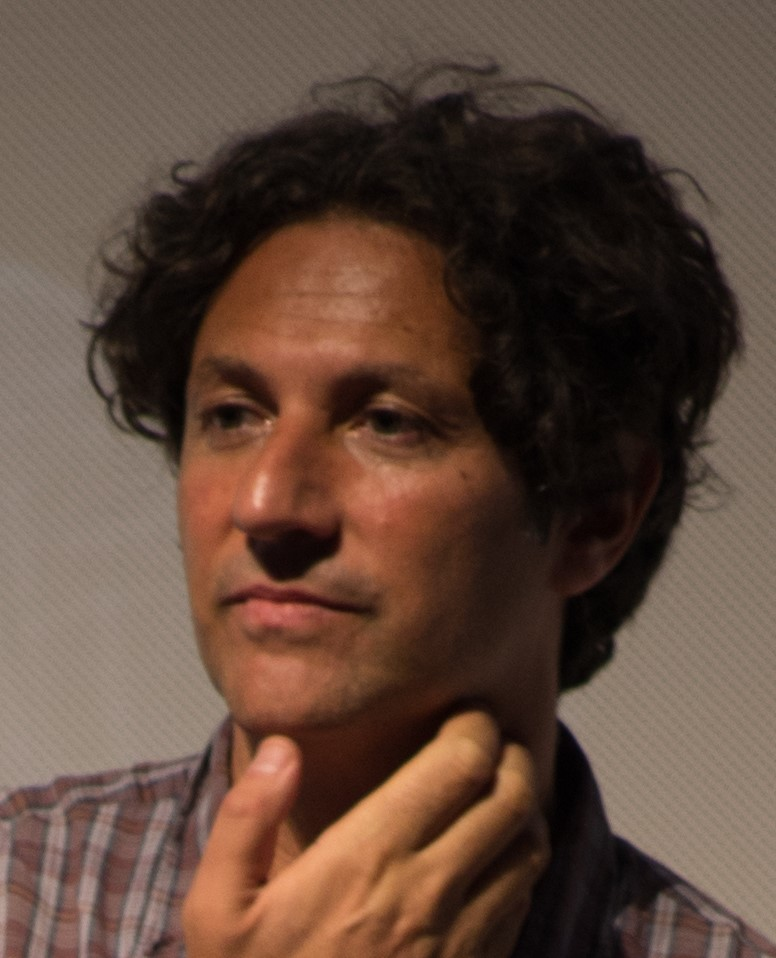
Jonathan Glazer, Grand Prix winner

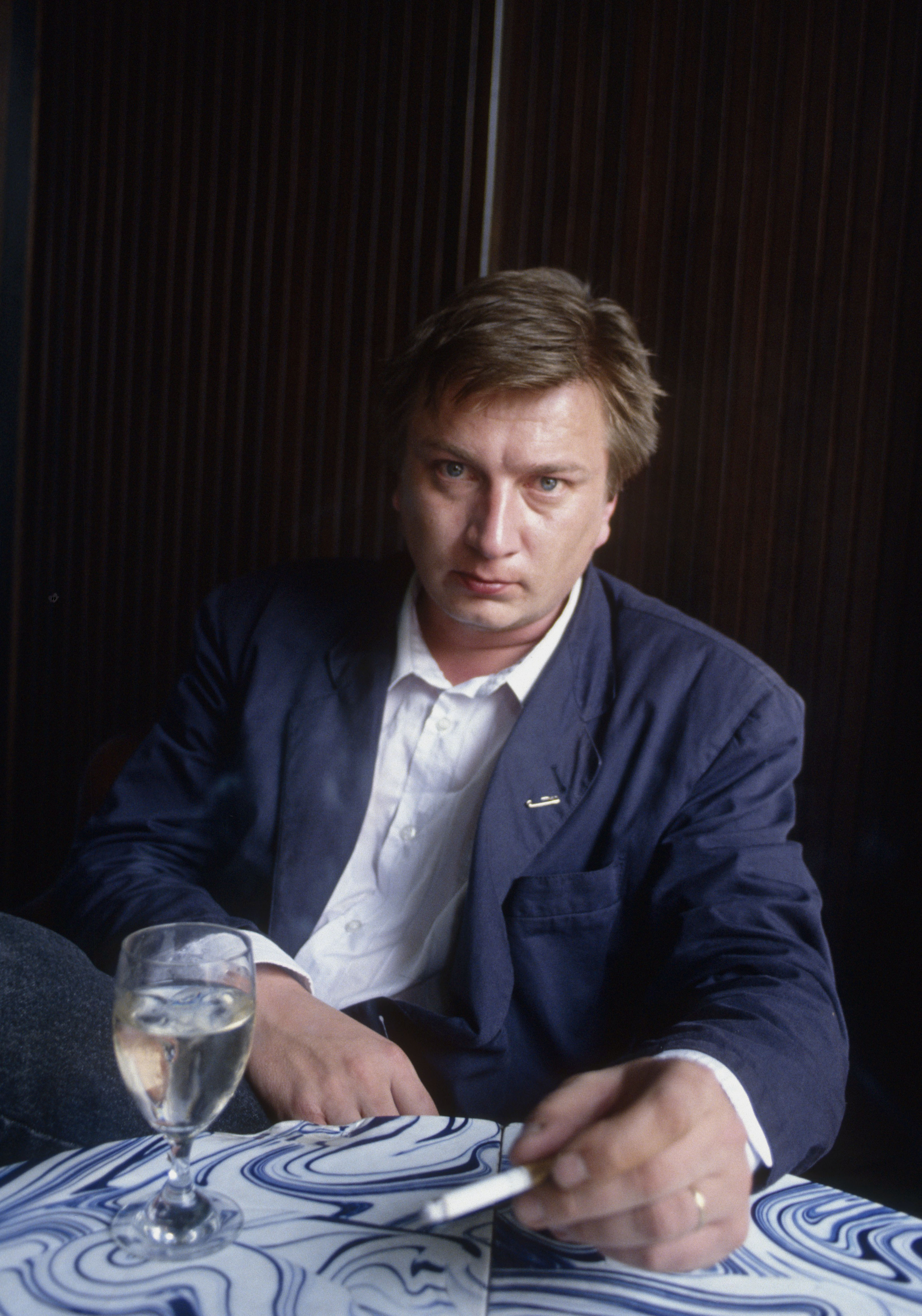
Aki Kaurismäki, Jury Prize winner

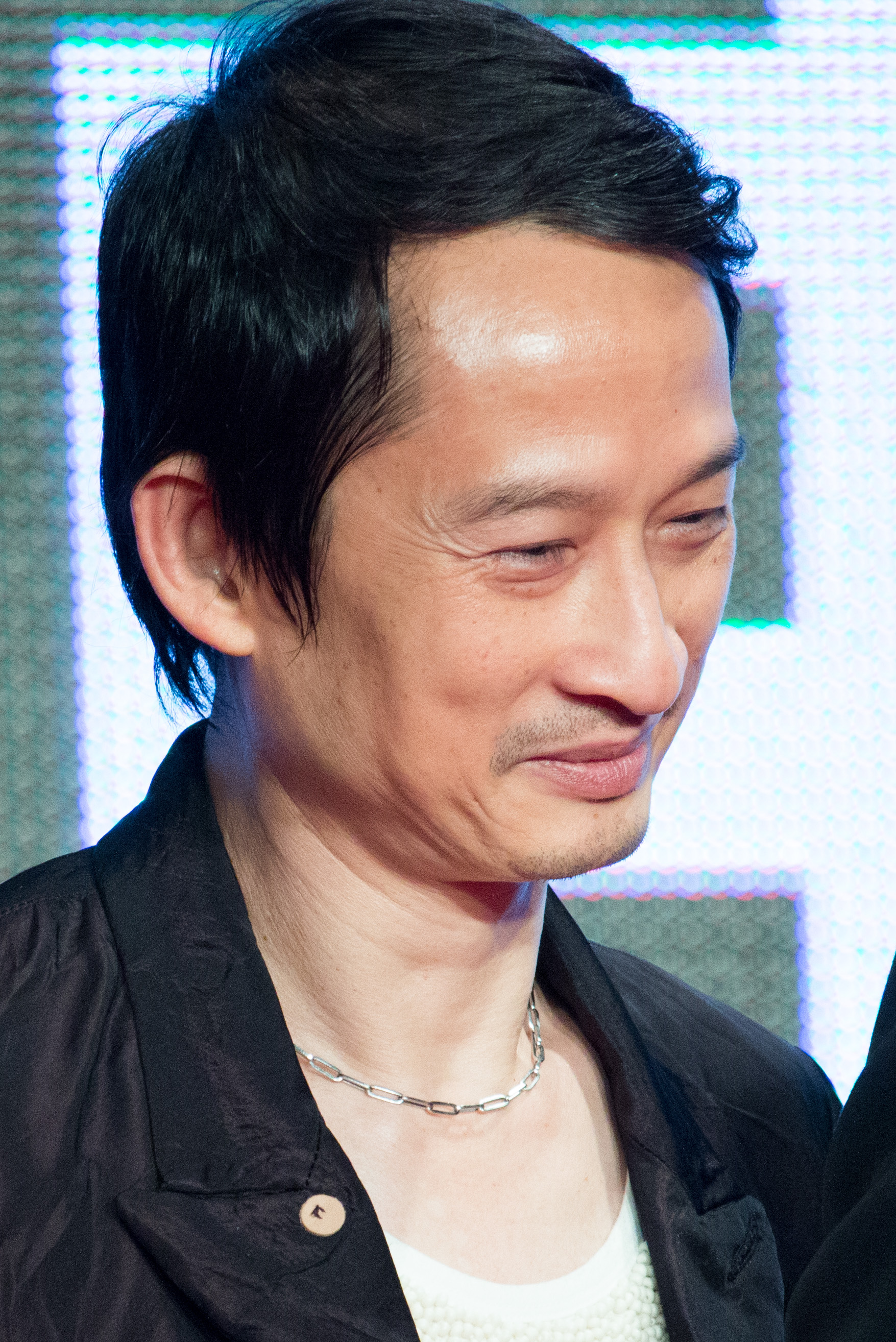
Tran Anh Hung, Best Director winner

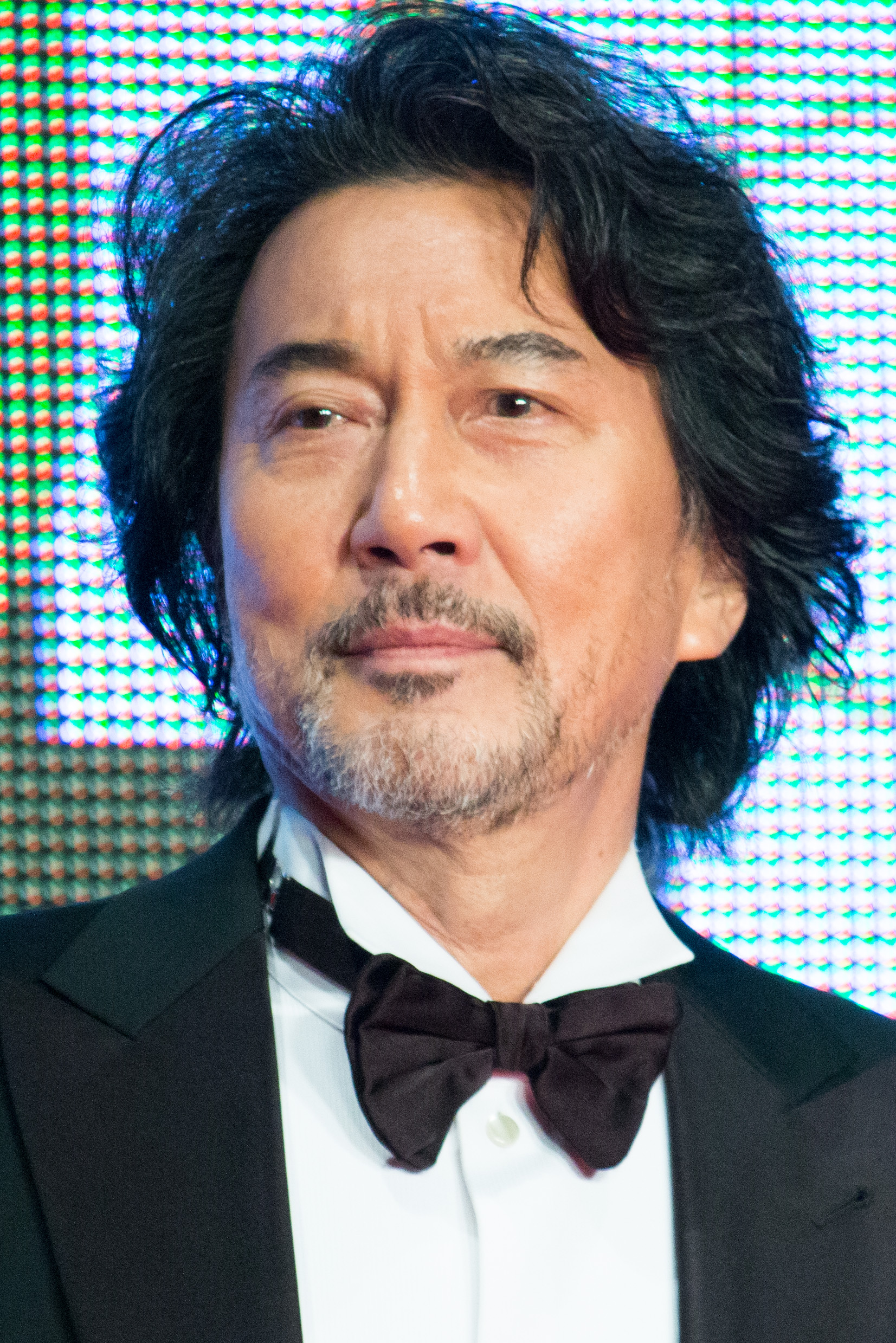
Koji Yakusho, Best Actor winner

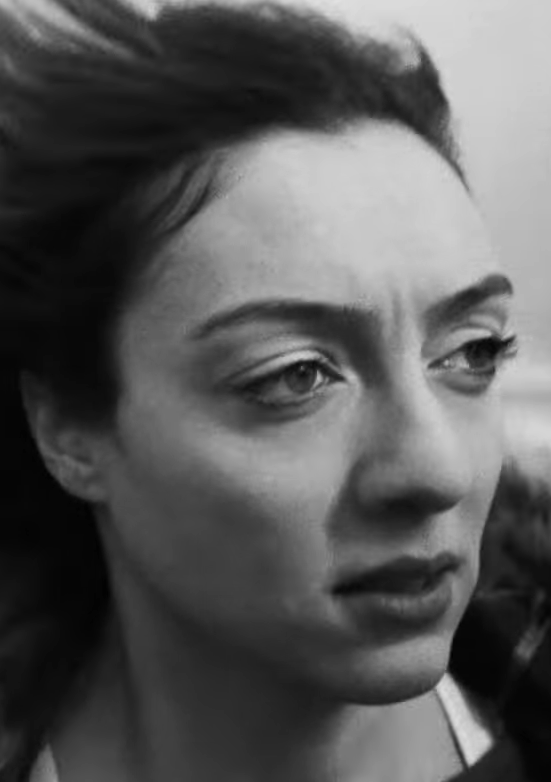
Merve Dizdar, Best Actress winner

=== In Competition ===
- Palme d'Or: Anatomy of a Fall by Justine Triet
- Grand Prix: The Zone of Interest by Jonathan Glazer
- Jury Prize: Fallen Leaves by Aki Kaurismäki
- Best Director: Tran Anh Hung for The Taste of Things
- Best Actress: Merve Dizdar for About Dry Grasses
- Best Actor: Koji Yakusho for Perfect Days
- Best Screenplay: Yuji Sakamoto for Monster

=== Un Certain Regard ===
- Un Certain Regard Prize: How to Have Sex by Molly Manning Walker
- Un Certain Regard Jury Prize: Hounds by Kamal Lazraq
- Un Certain Regard Best Director: The Mother of All Lies by Asmae El Moudir
- Un Certain Regard Freedom Prize: Goodbye Julia by Mohamed Kordofani
- Un Certain Regard Ensemble Prize: João Salaviza, Renée Nader Messora, Cast and Crew for The Buriti Flower
- Un Certain Regard New Voice Prize: Omen by Baloji

=== Honorary Palme d'Or ===
- Michael Douglas
- Harrison Ford

=== Caméra d'Or ===
- Inside the Yellow Cocoon Shell by Pham Thien An

=== Short Film Palm d'Or ===
- Short Film Palme d'Or: 27 by Flóra Anna Buda
  - Special Mention: Intrusion by Gunnur Martinsdóttir Schlüter

=== Cinéfondation ===
- First Prize: Norwegian Offspring by Marlene Emilie Lyngstad
- Second Prize: Hole by Hwang Hyein
- Third Prize: Moon by Zineb Wakrim

== Independent awards ==
=== FIPRESCI Prizes ===
- In Competition: The Zone of Interest by Jonathan Glazer
- Un Certain Regard: The Settlers by Felipe Gálvez Haberle
- Parallel section (first features): Power Alley by Lillah Halla

=== Prize of the Ecumenical Jury ===
- Perfect Days by Wim Wenders

=== Critics' Week ===
- Grand Prize: Tiger Stripes by Amanda Nell Eu
- French Touch Prize of the Jury: It's Raining in the House by Paloma Sermon-Daï
- Louis Roederer Foundation Rising Star Award: Jovan Ginić for Lost Country
- Leitz Cine Discovery Prize for Short Film: Boléro by Nans Laborde-Jourdàa
- Gan Foundation Award for Distribution: Inshallah a Boy by Amjad Al Rasheed
- SACD Prize: Iris Kaltenbäck for The Rapture
- Canal+ Award for Short Film: Boléro by Nans Laborde-Jourdàa

=== Directors' Fortnight ===
- Europa Cinemas Label Award for Best European Film: Creatura by Elena Martín Gimeno
- SACD Award for Best French-language Film: A Prince by Pierre Creton
- Carrosse d'Or: Souleymane Cissé

=== L'Œil d'or ===
- Four Daughters by Kaouther Ben Hania
- The Mother of All Lies by Asmae El Moudir

=== Queer Palm ===
- Monster by Hirokazu Kore-eda
- Best Short Film: Bolero by Nans Laborde-Jourdàa

=== Prix François Chalais ===
- Four Daughters by Kaouther Ben Hania

=== Prix de la Citoyenneté ===
- Citizenship Prize: Four Daughters by Kaouther Ben Hania

=== Cannes Soundtrack Award ===
- Mica Levi for The Zone of Interest

=== Prix des Cinémas Art et Essai ===
- AFCAE Art House Cinema Award: La chimera by Alice Rohrwacher
  - Special Mention: Fallen Leaves by Aki Kaurismäki

=== Palm Dog ===
- Palm Dog Award: Messi as Snoop in Anatomy of a Fall
- Grand Jury Prize: Alma in Fallen Leaves
- Mutt Moment: La chimera
- Highly Commended Canine: Susie in Vincent Must Die
- Lifetime Achievement Award: Ken Loach
- Palm DogManitarian Award: Isabella Rossellini

=== Trophée Chopard ===
- Daryl McCormack
- Naomi Ackie

== Notes ==
1.Previously titled "The Pot-au-feu".
