= Pierre Creton =

Pierre Creton is a French filmmaker and farmer.

== Filmography ==
- Secteur 545 - 2005
- Va, Toto! - 2017
- A Beautiful Summer (Le bel été) - 2019
- A Prince (Un Prince) - 2023
- 7 Walks with Mark Brown (Sept promenades avec Mark Brown) - 2024
