= A Prince =

- French: Un prince
- Directed by: Pierre Creton
- Screenplay by: Pierre Creton; Vincent Barré; Mathilde Giraud; Cyril Neyrat
- Produced by: Arnaud Dommerc
- Starring: Pierre Barray; Vincent Barré; Pierre Creton; Antoine Pirotte
- Narrated by: Mathieu Amalric; Françoise Lebrun; Grégory Gadebois
- Cinematography: Pierre Creton; Léo Gil Mela; Antoine Pirotte
- Edited by: Félix Rehm
- Music by: Jozef van Wissem
- Production company: Andolfi
- Release date: 18 May 2023 (Cannes)
- Running time: 82 minutes
- Country: France
- Language: French

A Prince (French: Un prince) is a 2023 French drama film directed by Pierre Creton. The film centres on Pierre-Joseph (played by Antoine Pirotte in youth and by Creton himself in adulthood), a young man who takes a job as an apprentice gardener under the tutelage of Adrien (Pierre Barray) and Alberto (Vincent Barré), with the three men later becoming lovers in a throuple.

The film features only limited direct dialogue among the main cast, with much of its dramatic exposition instead narrated in voice-over by actors Mathieu Amalric, Françoise Lebrun and Grégory Gadebois.

== Production ==
Creton, who has previously created primarily docufiction films that blended documentary and fictional aspects, described the film as the first time he "tuned into a wholly fictional voice".

== Distribution ==
The film premiered in the Directors' Fortnight stream at the 2023 Cannes Film Festival.

== Critical response ==
Lee Marshall of Screen Daily wrote that "Surely one of the most kookily unclassifiable films ever to have screened in Director’s Fortnight – a Cannes sidebar not known for playing it safe – compact 80-minute curio A Prince is a bizarre tale of horticulture and gay sex in Normandy. With a cast of mostly non-professional actors, it’s the latest work by agricultural worker and outsider artist Pierre Creton (“one of the world’s great cineaste-peasants”, as the presenter put it before the debut screening) who has made numerous films of varying lengths. A Prince is unlikely to step far outside of the festival and ultra-niche streaming market but nevertheless is a film with a distinct, quiet voice, one that gently invites its audience into a rural world that is so far from the mainstream that it feels like another planet. Filmed in boxy 16:9 ratio in a series of often painterly still shots, A Prince features a striking soundtrack – part Baroque courtly dance, part Doors-like instrumental – by Dutch lutenist Jozef van Wissem best known for scoring Only Lovers Left Alive."

For Cineuropa, Fabien Lemercier wrote that "At times very confronting and underpinned by static shots cut through with rough humanity (broken up by a handful of breath-taking frames), the film speaks volumes, in fragmented fashion, about a kind of humanity where muted violence abounds and where physical love and manual labour act as medicinal plants and lucky charms. But weirdness is never too far away... Because, as we’re also told, 'you have to understand that the road leads us home, yet far away from any abode'."

A Prince was ranked tenth on Cahiers du Cinéma's top 10 films of 2023 list, tied with Showing Up.

== Awards ==
At Cannes, the film was named the winner of the SACD award for Best French Film, and was shortlisted for the Queer Palm. The film was also named in the pre-selection for the 2023 Louis Delluc Prize for Best Film.
