= 2023 Vancouver International Film Festival =

2023 Canadian film festival

- Location: Vancouver, British Columbia, Canada
- Founded: 1958
- Festival date: September 28 - October 8, 2023
- Website: VIFF

Vancouver International Film Festival
- 43rd 41st

The 2023 Vancouver International Film Festival, the 42nd event in the history of the Vancouver International Film Festival, was held from September 28 to October 8, 2023.

== Awards ==
Winners of the juried Canadian film awards were announced on October 5. The Vanguard award winner was announced on October 8, and Audience Award winners were announced on October 12.

Award	Film	Filmmaker
Audience Award, Galas & Special Presentations	Monster	Hirokazu Kore-eda
Audience Award, Showcase	The Monk and the Gun	Pawo Choyning Dorji
Audience Award, Panorama	Irena's Vow	Louise Archambault
Audience Award, Vanguard	Let Me Go (Laissez-moi)	Maxime Rappaz
Audience Award, Northern Lights	Aitamaako'tamisskapi Natosi: Before the Sun	Banchi Hanuse
Audience Award, Insights	Physician, Heal Thyself	Asher Penn
Audience Award, Spectrum	Asog	Seán Devlin
Audience Award, Portraits	Call Me Dancer	Leslie Shampaine, Pip Gilmour
Audience Award, Altered States	Humanist Vampire Seeking Consenting Suicidal Person (Vampire humaniste cherche suicidaire consentant)	Ariane Louis-Seize
Best Canadian Film	Fitting In	Molly McGlynn
Best Canadian Film, Honorable Mention	Gamodi	Felix Kalmenson
Best Canadian Documentary	Someone Lives Here	Zack Russell
Best Canadian Documentary, Honorable Mention	Asog	Seán Devlin
Best Canadian Short Film	Katshinau	Julien G. Marcotte, Jani Bellefleur-Kaltush
Best Canadian Short Film, Honorable Mention	Our Grandmother the Inlet	Jaime Leigh Gianopoulos, Kayah George
Emerging Canadian Director	Valley of Exile	Anna Fahr
Emerging Canadian Director, Honorable Mention	Richelieu	Pier-Philippe Chevigny
Best BC Film	WaaPaKe	Jules Arita Koostachin
Best BC Film, Honorable Mention	Asog	Seán Devlin
Vanguard Award	Animal	Sofia Exarchou
Vanguard Award, Honorable Mention	Octopus Skin (La Piel Pulpo)	Ana Cristina Barragán

== Films ==
The full schedule was announced on September 6.

=== Galas and special presentations ===
English title	Original title	Director(s)	Production country
Anatomy of a Fall	Anatomie d'une chute	Justine Triet	France
The Boy and the Heron	君たちはどう生きるか	Hayao Miyazaki	Japan
La Chimera		Alice Rohrwacher	Italy, France, Switzerland
Fallen Leaves	Kuolleet lehdet	Aki Kaurismäki	Finland, Germany
I'm Just Here for the Riot		Kathleen Jayme, Asia Youngman	Canada
Last Summer	L'Été dernier	Catherine Breillat	
Monster	怪物	Hirokazu Kore-eda	Japan
Mr. Dressup: The Magic of Make-Believe		Robert McCallum	Canada
A Normal Family	보통의 가족	Hur Jin-ho	South Korea
The Old Oak		Ken Loach	United Kingdom, France, Belgium
The Pot-au-Feu	La Passion de Dodin Bouffant	Tran Anh Hung	France
Priscilla		Sofia Coppola	United States
The Promised Land	Bastarden	Nikolaj Arcel	Denmark, Germany, Sweden
Seven Veils		Atom Egoyan	Canada
Swan Song		Chelsea McMullan	Canada
The Zone of Interest		Jonathan Glazer	United Kingdom, Poland, United States

=== Showcase ===
English title	Original title	Director(s)	Production country
About Dry Grasses	Kuru Otlar Üstüne	Nuri Bilge Ceylan	Turkey, France, Germany, Sweden
Close to You		Dominic Savage	Canada, United Kingdom
Creature		Asif Kapadia	United Kingdom
The Delinquents	Los delincuentes	Rodrigo Moreno	Argentina, Brazil, Luxembourg, Chile
Do Not Expect Too Much from the End of the World	Nu astepta prea mult de la sfârsitul lumii	Radu Jude	Romania
Evil Does Not Exist	悪は存在しない	Ryûsuke Hamaguchi	Japan
Four Daughters	بنات ألفة	Kaouther Ben Hania	France, Tunisia, Germany, Saudi Arabia
Four Little Adults	Nelja Pienta Aikuista	Selma Vilhunen	Finland, Sweden
Green Border	Zielona granica	Agnieszka Holland	Poland, Czech Republic, France, Belgium
How to Have Sex		Molly Manning Walker	United Kingdom
I Am Sirat		Deepa Mehta, Sirat Taneja	Canada
Il Boemo		Petr Václav	Czech Republic, Italy, Slovakia
Just the Two of Us	L'Amour et les forêts	Valérie Donzelli	France
Kidnapped	Rapito	Marco Bellocchio	Italy, France, Germany
The Monk and the Gun		Pawo Choyning Dorji	Bhutan, France, United States, Taiwan
The Royal Hotel		Kitty Green	Australia, United Kingdom
The Teachers' Lounge	Das Lehrerzimmer	Ilker Çatak	Germany
They Shot the Piano Player	Dispararon al pianista	Fernando Trueba, Javier Mariscal	Spain, France
Tótem		Lila Avilés	Mexico, Denmark, France

=== Panorama ===
English title	Original title	Director(s)	Production country
19B		Ahmad Abdalla	Egypt
All Ears		Liu Jiayin	China
Blackbird Blackbird Blackberry		Elena Naveriani	Georgia, Switzerland
The Braid		Laetitia Colombani	France, Canada, Italy
Days of Happiness	Les Jours heureux	Chloé Robichaud	Canada
The Feeling That the Time for Doing Something Has Passed		Joanna Arnow	United States
Gamodi		Felix Kalmenson	Canada, Georgia
Goodbye Julia	وداعا جوليا	Mohamed Kordofani	Sudan
Here		Bas Devos	Belgium
Housekeeping for Beginners	Domakinstvo za Pocetnici	Goran Stolevski	Macedonia, Poland, Croatia, Serbia, Kosovo
If Only I Could Hibernate	Баавгай болохсон, Baavgai Bolohson	Zoljargal Purevdash	Mongolia
In Broad Daylight	白日之下	Lawrence Kan	Hong Kong
Irena's Vow		Louise Archambault	Canada, Poland
Let the River Flow	Ellos Eatnu	Ole Giæver	Norway, Sweden, Finland
Measures of Men	Der vermessene Mensch	Lars Kraume	Germany
Oceans Are the Real Continents	Los océanos son los verdaderos continentes	Tommaso Santambrogio	Cuba, Italy
One Day All This Will Be Yours	En dag kommer allt det här bli ditt	Andreas Öhman	Sweden
Only the River Flows	河边的错误	Wei Shujun	China
Puan		Maria Alché, Benjamín Naishtat	Argentina, Italy, France, Germany, Brazil
Raging Grace		Paris Zarcilla	United Kingdom
The Rapture	Le Ravissement	Iris Kaltenbäck	France
Red Rooms	Les Chambres rouges	Pascal Plante	Canada
Robot Dreams		Pablo Berger	Spain, France
The Settlers	Los Colonos	Felipe Gálvez Haberle	Chile
Snow in Midsummer	五月雪	Chong Keat Aun	Malaysia, Singapore, Taiwan
Suddenly		Melisa Önel	Turkey
There's No Place Like Home	Den, der lever stille	Puk Grasten	Denmark
Toll	Pedágio	Carolina Markowicz	Brazil, Portugal
A Tour Guide		Eun-mi Kwak	South Korea
Tsugaru Lacquer Girl	バカ塗りの娘	Keiko Tsuruoka	Japan
Undercurrent	アンダーカレント	Rikiya Imaizumi	Japan
Wild Swans	Gorai Phakhri	Rajni Basumatary	India

=== Vanguard ===
English title	Original title	Director(s)	Production country
Animal		Sofia Exarchou	Greece, Austria, Romania, Cyprus, Bulgaria
Bitten	La Morsure	Romain de Saint-Blanquat	France
The Face of the Jellyfish	El Rostro de la Medusa	Melisa Liebenthal	Argentina
Let Me Go	Laissez-moi	Maxime Rappaz	Switzerland, France, Belgium
Octopus Skin	La Piel Pulpo	Ana Cristina Barragán	Ecuador
On the Go		María Gisèle Royo, Julia de Castro	Spain
The Sea and Its Waves	La Mer et ses vagues	Liana Kassir, Renaud Pachot	Lebanon, France
Tomorrow Is a Long Time	Míng tian bi zuo tian chang jiu	Jow Zhi Wei	Singapore, Taiwan, France, Portugal

=== Northern Lights ===
English title	Original title	Director(s)	Production country
Aitamaako'tamisskapi Natosi: Before the Sun		Banchi Hanuse	Canada
Les Filles du Roi		Corey Payette	Canada
Fitting In		Molly McGlynn	Canada
Float		Sherren Lee	Canada
Hey, Viktor!		Cody Lightning	Canada
I Don't Know Who You Are		M. H. Murray	Canada
I Used to Be Funny		Ally Pankiw	Canada
In Flames		Zarrar Kahn	Canada
Richelieu		Pier-Philippe Chevigny	Canada
Seagrass		Meredith Hama-Brown	Canada
Someone Lives Here		Zack Russell	Canada
Union Street		Jamila Pomeroy	Canada
When Adam Changes	Adam change lentement	Joël Vaudreuil	Canada
Wild Goat Surf		Caitlyn Sponheimer	Canada

=== Insights ===
English title	Original title	Director(s)	Production country
Common Ground		Josh Tickell, Rebecca Harrell Tickell	United States
Deep Rising		Matthieu Rytz	United States
The Invention of the Other	A invenção do Outro	Bruno Jorge	Brazil
Lynx Man	Ilveskuiskaaja	Juha Suonpää	Finland, Estonia
Mareya Shot, Keetah Goal: Make the Shot		Baljit Sangra, Nilesh Patel	Canada
The Mission		Amanda McBaine, Jesse Moss	United States, India
On the Adamant	Sur l'Adamant	Nicolas Philibert	France, Japan
Physician, Heal Thyself		Asher Penn	Canada
WaaPaKe		Jules Arita Koostachin	Canada
Winter Chants	冬未來	Jessey Tsang Tsui-Shan	Hong Kong

=== Spectrum ===
English title	Original title	Director(s)	Production country
Asog		Seán Devlin	Canada, Philippines
Between Revolutions	Între revoluții	Vlad Petri	Romania, Croatia, Iran
Hello Dankness		Soda Jerk	Australia
Kim's Video		David Redmon, Ashley Sabin	United States, United Kingdom, France
Lonely Oaks	Vergiss Meyn Nicht	Fabiana Fragale, Kilian Kuhlendahl, Jens Mühlhoff	Germany
Mighty Afrin: In the Time of Floods		Angelos Rallis	Greece, France, Germany
The Mother of All Lies	Kadib Abyad	Asmae El Moudir	Morocco, Egypt, Saudi Arabia, Qatar
Orlando, My Political Biography	Orlando, ma biographie politique	Paul B. Preciado	France
Smoke Sauna Sisterhood	Savvusanna sõsarad	Anna Hints	Estonia, France, Iceland
The Tuba Thieves		Alison O'Daniel	United States

=== Portraits ===
English title	Original title	Director(s)	Production country
Anselm	Anselm – Das Rauschen der Zeit	Wim Wenders	Germany
Apolonia, Apolonia		Lea Glob	Denmark, Poland
Caiti Blues		Justine Harbonnier	Canada, France
Call Me Dancer		Leslie Shampaine, Pip Gilmour	United States, India
A Cooler Climate		James Ivory, Giles Gardner	France
Invisible Beauty		Bethann Hardison, Frédéric Tcheng	United States
It's Only Life After All		Alexandria Bombach	United States
Pianoforte		Jakub Piątek	Poland
Robert Irwin: A Desert of Pure Feeling		Jennifer Lane	United States
Sculpting the Giant		Banu Wirandoko, Rheza Arden Wiguna	Indonesia

=== Altered States ===
English title	Original title	Director(s)	Production country
The Animal Kingdom	Le Règne animal	Thomas Cailley	France
Animalia	Parmi nous	Sofia Alaoui	Morocco, France, Qatar
Chronicles of a Wandering Saint	Crónicas de una Santa Errante	Tomas Gomez Bustillo	Argentina, United States
Humanist Vampire Seeking Consenting Suicidal Person	Vampire humaniste cherche suicidaire consentant	Ariane Louis-Seize	Canada
My Animal		Jacqueline Castel	Canada
Restore Point	Bod obnovy	Robert Hloz	Czech Republic, Poland, Serbia, Slovakia
The Sacrifice Game		Jenn Wexler	United States
Tiger Stripes		Amanda Nell Eu	Malaysia, Taiwan, France, Germany
The Wait	La espera	F. Javier Gutierrez	Spain
White Plastic Sky	Műanyag égbolt	Tibor Bánóczki, Sarolta Szabó	Hungary, Slovakia

=== Leading Lights ===
A special program curated by guest programmer Anthony Shim, featuring a selection of films that had influenced his own journey as a filmmaker.

English title	Original title	Director(s)	Production country
Dust in the Wind	戀戀風塵	Hou Hsiao-hsien	Taiwan
Joint Security Area	공동경비구역	Park Chan-wook	South Korea
Peppermint Candy	박하사탕	Lee Chang-dong	South Korea, Japan
A Woman Under the Influence		John Cassavetes	United States

=== Focus: Women, Life and Freedom ===
A special program curated by guest programmer Fay Nass, screening films about misogyny and the subjugation of women.

English title	Original title	Director(s)	Production country
Joonam		Sierra Urich	United States
Numb		Amir Toodehroosta	Iran
Seven Winters in Tehran	Sieben Winter in Teheran	Steffi Niederzoll	Germany, France
Terrestrial Verses	Ayeh Haye Zamini	Ali Asgari, Alireza Khatami	Iran
Valley of Exile		Anna Fahr	Canada, Lebanon

=== Short Forum ===
All films in this short film program are Canadian.

English title	Original title	Director(s)	Province
All the Days of May	Tous les jours de mai	Miryam Charles	Quebec
Ancestral Threads		Sean Stiller	British Columbia
Between You and Me		Cameron Kletke	British Columbia
Black Box Investigations		Paige Smith	British Columbia
Cassandra		Bea Santos	Ontario
Cloud Striker		Allan W. Hopkins	British Columbia
Conviction		Bruce Thomas Miller	Alberta
The Company We Keep		Wojtek Jakubiec	Quebec
Cristo Negro		Paul Stavropoulos, Brendan Mills	Ontario
Death Mask		John Greyson	Ontario
Defining Human		Daniel Code	British Columbia
Dickinsonia		Charline Dally	Quebec
Donna		Keenan MacWilliam	Ontario
Dream Tricks: Over a Six Stair		Adam Seward	Ontario
Element		Will Niava	Quebec
Four Mile Creek		Ryan McKenna	Quebec
Gentle Hum of Spring		Simon Garez	Saskatchewan
The Great Kind Mystery		Ella Morton	Newfoundland and Labrador
Hair or No Hair		Janessa St. Pierre	British Columbia
Her Name Is Like a Sigh		Solara Thanh-Binh Dang	British Columbia
In the Wake of the Cedar Tree		Towustasin	British Columbia
Katshinau		Julien G. Marcotte, Jani Bellefleur-Kaltush	Quebec
Lake Baikal	Baigal Nuur	Alisi Telengut	Quebec
Les Lavandières		Laura Kamugisha	Quebec
Making Babies	Faire un enfant	Eric K. Boulianne	Quebec
Master of the House		Dylan Maranda	British Columbia
Modern Goose		Karsten Wall	Manitoba
Mothers and Monsters		Édith Jorisch	Quebec
My Tomato Heart	Mon cœur de tomate	Benoît Le Rouzès Ménard	Quebec
Nigiqtuq (The South Wind)		Lindsay McIntyre	Alberta
Our Grandmother the Inlet		Jaime Leigh Gianopoulos, Kayah George	British Columbia
Outside Center		Eli Jean Tahchi	Quebec
Portrait of the Con Artist as a Young Man		Ryan Leedu	Alberta
Redlights		Eva Thomas	Ontario
Return to Hairy Hill	Retour à Hairy Hill	Daniel Gies	Quebec
Return to Ombabika		Ma-Nee Chacaby, Zoe Gordon, Shayne Ehman	Ontario
Silkworm		Amir Honarmand	British Columbia
Sisters		Marisa Hoicka	Ontario
Soleil de Nuit		Fernando Lopez Escriva, Maria Camila Arias	Quebec
Something Else	Autre Chose	Étienne Lacelle	Quebec
Swallow Flying to the South		Mochi Lin	British Columbia
Sub Terra		Jeffrey Zablotny	Ontario
Sun, Moon and Four Peaks		Kevin Jin Kwan Kim	British Columbia
Take Care		Tony Massil	British Columbia
Two Apples		Bahram Javahery	British Columbia, Yukon
Two One Two		Shira Avni	Quebec
Unspeakable Heap		Kara Ditte Hansen	British Columbia
Where Rabbits Come From	D'où viennent les lapins	Colin Ludvic Racicot	Quebec
You Feel Soft		Cameron Kletke	British Columbia
Yun		Yuezhang Qin	British Columbia

=== International Shorts ===
English title	Original title	Director(s)	Production country
Almost Fall	Presque l'automne	Margot Pouppeville	France
Basri & Salma in a Never-Ending Comedy	Basri & Salma Dalam Komedi Yang Terus Berputar	Khozy Rizal	Indonesia, United States
Beyond the Sea		Hippolyte Leibovici	Belgium, France
Big Bang		Carlos Segundo	Brazil
Big Day		Chung Chieh Chiang	Taiwan
Confessions		Stephanie Kaznocha	United States
Cuarto de Hora		Nemo Arancibia	Chile, France
Cut		Samuel Lucas Allen	Australia
Fairplay		Zoel Aeschbacher	Switzerland, France
The Family Circus		Andrew Fitzgerald	United States
Far from the Tree	Daleko od stromu	Emma Marková	Czech Republic
Headdress		Taietsarón:sere ‘Tai’ Leclaire	United States
Hedgehog		D. Mitry	United States
Hide Your Crazy		Austin Kase	United States
In Too Deep		Chris Overton	United Kingdom
Jeong-Dong		Choi Woo Gene	South Korea
Just a Rehearsal	Solo un Ensayo	Hugo Sanz	Spain
Just the Two of Us	Toutes les deux	Clara Lemaire Anspach	France
A Lien		Sam Cutler-Kreutz, David Cutler-Kreutz	United States
Lovebugs		Teddy Alvarez-Nissen	United States
Mira		Eva Louise Hall	United States
Night Shift	Turno nocturno Santiago Lago	Argentina	
Nowhere		Garin Hovannisian	Armenia, United States
An Ordinary Day		Ju-yeon Gim	South Korea
Pisko the Crab Child Is in Love		Makoto Nagahisa	Japan
Snif & Snüf		Michael J. Ruocco	United States
Southern Afternoon	Nan fang wu hou	Tian Lan	China
Spasm	اسپاسم	Sahra Asadollahi	Iran
Sushi		Iván Morales	Spain
Where the Time Goes		Justin Tyler Close	United States, Canada
Youssou & Malek	Youssou et Malek	Simon Frenay	France

=== Modes ===
English title	Original title	Director(s)	Production country
Aqueronte		Manuel Muñoz Rivas	Spain
A Bird Called Memory		Leonardo Martinelli	Brazil, United Kingdom
Let's Talk		Simon Liu	Hong Kong
Loving in Between		Jyoti Mistry	South Africa, Austria
Mast-del		Maryam Tafakory	Iran, United Kingdom
Mother Land		Kantarama Gahigiri	Rwanda, Switzerland
NYC RGB		Viktoria Schmid	Austria, United States
Shadow Does		Laure Prouvost	Belgium, France, Austria
Slow Shift		Shambhavi Kaul	India, United States
Square the Circle		Hanna Hovitie	Finland
This Is Not Here		Charlotte Mungomery	Australia, Peru, Spain
