= 9th Indie Series Awards =

- Date: April 4, 2018
- Site: The Colony Theatre, Los Angeles
- Hosted by: Patrika Darbo

Highlights
- Most awards: Ladies of the Lake (4)
- Most nominations: Ladies of the Lake (18)

The 9th Indie Series Awards were held on April 4, 2018, at The Colony Theatre in Los Angeles, with the ceremony hosted by Emmy Award-winner Patrika Darbo. Presented by We Love Soaps, the awards recognize independently produced, scripted entertainment created for the web.

Ladies of the Lake led all series with 18 total nominations, followed by The Bay with 16. Filth City led all comedies with 12 nominations. The first ever category for unscripted shows was added this year.

== Awards ==
The awards were given on April 4, 2017. Winners are listed first and highlighted in boldface:

**Best Web Series — Drama**: **Giants**; Anacostia; The Bay; L.A. Macabre; Ladies of the Lake; Riley Parra; Running with Violet; Teenagers	**Best Web Series — Comedy**: **How to Buy a Baby**; 190 Lorimer; The Amazing Hoolister Park; The Amazing Hoolister Park; Dear Mankind; Filth City; Indoor Boys; ThreadBare
**Best Directing — Drama**: **Dan Ast, L.A. Macabre**; Sonia Blangiardo, Ladies of the Lake; James Bland, Giants; Gregori J. Martin, The Bay; Lindsay McKay, Running with Violet; Sonja O'Hara & Dan McBride, Doomsday	**Best Directing — Comedy**: **Molly McGlynn, How to Buy a Baby**; Gaston Armagno, The Amazing Hoolister Park; Cameron Fife & Andy Goldenberg, Bad Timing; Andy King, Filth City; Victoria Rowell, The Rich and the Ruthless; Natalie Smyka, ThreadBare
**Best Writing — Drama**: **James Bland, Giants**; Anthony Anderson, Anacostia; Dan Ast, L.A. Macabre; Michael Caruso, Ladies of the Lake; Marie-Claire Marcotte & Rebecca Davey, Running with Violet; Gregori J. Martin, Karen Harris, Anne Schoettle, Julie Poll, & Wendy Riche, The Bay	**Best Writing — Comedy**: **Natalie Smyka, ThreadBare**; Andy King & Danny Polishchuck, Filth City; Wendy Litner, How to Buy a Baby; John Loos, John Loos: Too Big For This World; Dan Perlman & Kevin Iso, Flatbush Misdemeanors; Victoria Rowell & Jamey Giddens, The Rich and the Ruthless
**Best Lead Actor — Drama**: **Kyle Lowder, Ladies of the Lake**; Anthony Anderson, Anacostia; Kristos Andrews, The Bay; Aidan Bristow, L.A. Macabre; Ryan Hellquist, L.A. Macabre; Kyseem Roberts, Oldhead	**Best Lead Actor — Comedy**: **Alex Wyse, Indoor Boys**; Andy Goldenberg, Bad Timing; John Loos, John Loos: Too Big For This World; Dan Perlman, Flatbush Misdemeanors; Wesley Taylor, Indoor Boys; Pat Thornton, Filth City
**Best Lead Actress — Drama**: **Marem Hassler, Riley Parra**; Tamieka Chavis, Anacostia; Kate Conway, Out With Dad; Jessica Morris, Ladies of the Lake; Karrueche Tran, The Bay; Corsica Wilson, L.A. Macabre	**Best Lead Actress — Comedy**: **Rachel B. Joyce, Royally**; Lisa Ebersole, 37 Problems; Meghan Heffern, How to Buy a Baby; Alesha Renee, The Rich and the Ruthless; Paula Rhodes, The New Adventures of Peter and Wendy; Natalie Smyka, ThreadBare
**Best Supporting Actor — Drama**: **Wil Lash, Anacostia**; Raymond Ablack, Teenagers; Brandon Beemer, The Bay; Levi Jennings, At Bay; Eric Nelson, The Bay; Andreas Wyder, Or So the Story Goes	**Best Supporting Actor — Comedy**: **Andy King, Filth City**; Gaston Armagno, The Amazing Hoolister Park; Michael Colyar, The Rich and the Ruthless; Tom Costello, ThreadBare; Percy Daggs III, The New Adventures of Peter and Wendy; Michael Perrie Jr., F'd
**Best Supporting Actress — Drama**: **Lindsey Middleton, Out With Dad**; Olivia Baptista, Here We Wait; Jillian Clare, Ladies of the Lake; Jade Harlow, The Bay; Maeve Quinlan, Riley Parra; Brandy Redd, L.A. Macabre	**Best Supporting Actress — Comedy**: **June Diane Raphael, ThreadBare**; Juliette Daniel, The New Adventures of Peter and Wendy; Kathleen Phillips, Filth City; Victoria Rowell, The Rich and the Ruthless; Medina Senghore, Friend Therapy; Jacklyn Zeman, Misguided
**Best Guest Actor — Drama**: **Ian Buchanan, Ladies of the Lake**; Thomas Calabro, The Bay; Bruce Davidson, The Bay; Chad Duell, The Bay; Paul Eiding, Riley Parra; Tremayne Norris, Anacostia	**Best Guest Actor — Comedy**: **Zac Titus, Bad Timing**; Jim Beaver, The New Adventures of Peter and Wendy; Devin Field, Doin' It; Frankie Grande, Indoor Boys; Chris Kervick, John Loos: Too Big For This World; Michael Litchfield, Valet
**Best Guest Actress — Drama**: **Arianne Zucker, Ladies of the Lake**; Jennifer Bassey, Anacostia; Judi Blair, Anacostia; Patrika Darbo, The Bay; Patrika Darbo, Ladies of the Lake; Dee Freeman, Anacostia	**Best Guest Actress — Comedy**: **Patrika Darbo, Indoor Boys**; Emma Hunter, How to Buy a Baby; Becca Levine, John Loos: Too Big For This World; Mindy Sterling, The Room Actors: Where Are They Now?; Caryn Ward Ross, The Rich and the Ruthless; Leslie Watkinds, Doin' It
**Best Ensemble — Drama**: **The Bay**; Anacostia; Giants; L.A. Macabre; Ladies of the Lake; Oldhead; Teenagers	**Best Ensemble — Comedy**: **The Rich and the Ruthless**; The Amazing Gayl Pile; F'd; Grip and Electric; He's With Me; Plant: The Second Coming
**Best Production Design**: **Florian Wolf, Dear Mankind**; Dan Ast, L.A. Macabre; Michael Caruso, Barbara Caruso, & Kyle Lowder, Ladies of the Lake; Tom Chamberlain & Dipu Bhattacharya, The Pantsless Detective; Katie Moest, The New Adventures of Peter and Wendy; Cassie Vance, Riley Parra	**Best Costume Design**: **Vanessa Fischer, Filth City**; Adam Henry Garcia & Mike Perlman, The Chief; Virginia Hemstreet, The Pantsless Detective; Marquita Lopez, The Bay; Mari Viera, Boy Scauts
**Best Special/Visual Effects**: **Andreas Schmidt, Dear Mankind**; Dipu Bhattacharya, The Pantsless Detective; Robert Chapin, The Hunted: Encore; Jamie Dickinson, Here We Wait; Bernardo Schnitzler, Guido Ferro & Vero Gatti, Psychosomatic	**Best Makeup**: **Jen Fregozo & Jennifer Corona, Ladies of the Lake**; George Barr, Roads to Keystone; Ren Bray & Leanne Mucci, The Bay; Alexa Camargo, Bad Timing; Malia Miglino, L.A. Macabre; Jessica Panetta, Filth City
**Best Soundtrack**: **Judith Avers, Or So the Story Goes**; Henrik Jose, Dear Mankind; Paul F. Antonelli, Ladies of the Lake; Andy King, Matt King, & andrew Ferguson, Filth City; Ginger Pauley, Vintage America with Ginger; Samantha McNeilly, Kaya Pinto, & Aimee Bessada, How to Buy a Baby	**Best Original Song**: **"Lost", Giants**; "45", Or So the Story Goes; "Baffled", Giants; "Here", Here We Wait; "It Only Takes One Bite", The Hunted: Encore; "Living the Dream", Ladies of the Lake
**Best Editing**: **Nick Nordfors, Haunt ME**; Andy Goldenberg, Bad Timing; Rodolphe Portier, Ladies of the Lake; Idris Talib, Ownself Check Clonseself; Brian Wilson, Riley Parra; Floris Asche & Woitek Konzal, Dear Mankind	**Best Cinematography**: **David Chung, Riley Parra**; Fiorella Occhipinti, ThreadBare; Jonathan Pope, Valet; Rodolphe Portier, Ladies of the Lake; Michael Schneider, Dear Mankind; Matthias Schubert & CJ Brion, The Bay
**Best Original Score**: **Mike Meehan, L.A. Macabre**; Ken Corday & D. Brent Nelson, Ladies of the Lake; Adrian Ellis, Out With Dad; MMiles Ito, Here We Wait; Matt Lajoie, Haunt ME; Poor Paul, Filth City	**Best Non-Fiction Series**: **Vintage America with Ginger**; 1 Minute Meal; Haunt ME; Where I Don't Belong
