= Beyond Eden =

Musical written by Bruce Ruddell

Beyond Eden is also the title of a science fiction novel by David Duncan (writer).

Beyond Eden is a musical written by Bruce Ruddell with music by Bruce Ruddell and Bill Henderson. It premiered February 16, 2010 at the Max Bell Theatre at the Epcor Centre for the Performing Arts in Calgary, Alberta, Canada and in Vancouver at the Vancouver Playhouse as part of the Cultural Olympiad. The show was first mounted by Theatre Calgary and ran until March 7, 2010. The Vancouver show ran from January 16 to February 6, 2010 and was well received for its cast, musical score and background projections.

Beyond Eden is a fictional story inspired by the real life of Wilson Duff (1925–1976), a curator of anthropology at the British Columbia Provincial Museum, Canadian artist Bill Reid, and their removal of Haida totem poles and monuments on the coast of British Columbia in an effort to preserve them. The Calgary and Vancouver shows starred actor/musicians Tom Jackson and John Mann.

== Synopsis ==
=== Act I ===
It is 1957. The play opens with the song, "Behind the Mask", where Lewis Wilson is having a conversation with The Watchman about Haida masks. Watchmen were men on duty around the village whose job it was to protect from invaders. He tells Lewis a story about the Raven and the Eagle, who are on the beach when the white man approaches the coast for the first time. The Watchman speaks of a gift that he "gave" Lewis – a mask with its eyes closed because it is looking inward. Lewis learns that the mask has a twin, with its eyes open.

We then see a crew loading a ship to leave port (Hecate's Fist). The men have been hired to travel to Haida Gwaii and Kitwancool to cut down and transport several Haida totem poles for preservation at a museum. Lewis and his friend, Max Tomson, a photographer who is half Haida, are excited about their trip and Lewis jokes with him to keep the pictures in focus this time. Among the crew are Clive and Gregory, who work for the museum and are glad to be out on the expedition. Two "Indian" guides have been hired to accompany the crew, Victor Duncan and Joe Duncan (nicknamed "Stinky"), and Joe clearly has reservations about the trip. We also meet Lewis' wife, Sal Wilson, and son, Jack Wilson. Sal has convinced Lewis to take her and Jack along on this expedition as he has been dedicated to his work, sometimes staying out all night long. We learn that Jack is estranged from his father and is a little awkward around people. We also learn that he has a crush on a girl at a local store but is unsure how to introduce himself to her ("Howa Baby"). The crew gives him advice and teaches him a few Haida phrases. Sal and Lewis have a touching moment on the deck (Ribbons of Light) when they hear that a storm has been reported. Although it seems clear on the water where they are sailing, Lewis encourages Sal to go under deck.

Lewis and the crew reflect on their expedition (Mystery). Max sings about his two worlds as half Haida, half European ("Disconnection"). A group of Haida women appear in a vision to Max ("The Spirit Song"). Max suddenly notices that Joe and Victor are acting suspicious. He confronts them and discovers that they were going to escape from the vessel by stealing the life raft. He attempts to wrestle them from the area and they resist. A fight breaks out and Lewis comes from below deck to discover the confusion as the storm breaks out ("No Contact"). The first act ends.

=== Act II ===
The crew is now landed in the forest near the Haida totem poles ("Beyond Eden"). They are wet and tired from their adventure on the water the previous evening, but credit Joe and Victor for saving their lives and getting them beyond the reefs. Victor acknowledges that the crew saved his and Joe's lives by refusing to let them get off the ship on the life raft. The men prepare for their various duties ("Ninstints").

Lewis becomes increasingly obsessed with the two masks and The Watchman visits him once again, continuing the Raven and Eagle story that he began telling in Act I. He credits Lewis for coming this far but tells him that he cannot let Lewis remove the poles. Lewis discovers that the two masks are meant to go together; one nests inside the other. Sal is worried about Lewis becoming more distant ("Beyond Eden Reprise"). Max reflects on the carvings on the totem poles ("Carving") and the vision of the Haida women appear to him again ("The Spirit Song"). As the men are about to cut down the totem poles, Lewis returns from being out all night and refuses to allow them to complete their work; he has changed his opinion about removing the poles based on his discussion with The Watchman. They discover that the chain saws are too wet to start and get axes to chop down the poles. A fight breaks out as Lewis attempts to oppose Clive and they struggle for the axe. Lewis begs Max to "back him up" but Max steadfastly refuses to turn back because he believes that he is finally appreciating his Haida heritage. Lewis finally grabs an axe and begins wildly chopping down the poles until the crew overpowers him and begin cutting down the poles themselves.

The second act ends as the totem poles are falling ("We Go On").

== Cast and crew ==
=== Theatre Calgary Production ===
Lewis Wilson	The Watchman	Sal Wilson	Jack Wilson	Max Tomson	Victor Duncan	Joe Duncan	Clive	Gregory
John Mann	Tom Jackson	Jennifer Lines	Andrew Kushnir	Cameron McDuffee	Tracey Olson	Telly James	Curt McKinstry	Christopher Hunt

- Chorus:
  - Julian Black Antelope
  - Meegwun Fairbrother
  - Corey Payette
  - Raven Ann Potschka
  - Erika Raelene Stocker
- Dennis Garnhum – Director
- Bill Henderson — Musical director
- Jacques Lemay – Choreographer
- The Beyond Eden Band:
  - Bill Sample — Conductor, Keyboards
  - Adrian Dolan — Viola
  - Dave Corman — Guitars
  - Laurence Mollerup — Electric Bass, Contrabass
  - Randall Stoll — Drums and Percussion
- Bretta Gerecke – Set & Costume Design
- Kevin Lamotte – Lighting Design
- Alan Brodie – Lighting Design
- Jamie Nesbitt – Projection Design
- Chris Jacko – Sound Design
- Michael Rinaldi – Soundscape Design
- Gwaai Edenshaw – Haida Visual Art
- Jean-Pierre Fournier – Fight Director
- Shari Wattling – Dramaturg
- Rick Rinder – Stage Manager
- Stacey Kotlar – Assistant Stage Manager
- Gillian Pinckney – Apprentice Stage Manager

== Musical Numbers ==
=== Act I ===
- Behind the Mask – Lewis, Ensemble
- Hecate's Fist – Clive, Gregory, Ensemble
- Howa Baby – Jack
- Ribbons of Light – Sal, Lewis
- Mystery – Lewis, Ensemble
- Disconnection – Max, Ensemble
- The Spirit Song – Haid Woman
- No Contact – Full Company

=== Act II ===
- Beyond Eden – Lewis, Ensemble
- Ninstints – Clive, Gregory, Victor, Joe, Lewis, Ensemble
- Beyond Eden Reprise – Sal
- Carving – Max, Ensemble
- The Spirit Song – Haida Woman
- Waiting for Me – Lewis
- War Song – Haida Woman
- The Watchman's Song – The Watchman
- I Hear You Call My Name – Sal
- We Go On – Ensemble

== Development ==
Beyond Eden was developed as part of Theatre Calgary's FUSE Play Development Program in 2008 and was workshopped at the Vancouver Playhouse and Belfry Theatre in Victoria, British Columbia.

The music for Beyond Eden was written by Bruce Ruddell and Bill Henderson, with Haida-inspired music written by Gwaai Edenshaw. Ruddell had been considering the story of the Haida Gwaii totem poles since 1984, beginning as an oratorio called The World is as Sharp as a Knife, then a 90-minute composition, before it was reinvented as a musical. Bill Reid was a close friend of Ruddell and was a key part of the play's development. Derek Edenshaw served as a consultant on the Haida songs and ceremonies.

== Reception ==
Beyond Eden received a positive review in The Vancouver Sun, with critic Peter Birnie calling it "a genuinely compelling and largely successful attempt to blend 'white' and 'Indian' sensibilities." Kathleen Oliver of The Georgia Straight gave the musical a mixed review, praising the cast, musical score, and background projections but holding that the story and characterizations fell short.

In a detailed critique in his 2020 book Hungry Listening: Resonant Theory for Indigenous Sound Studies, Dylan Robinson explains that Beyond Eden "omits specific information surrounding the cultural and spiritual significance of the poles," which is largely unknown to non-Indigenous audiences apart from the poles' use in "cultural iconography." In so doing, the musical embraces a "salvage paradigm," implying that the Haida were unable to care for their own culture and needed outsiders to preserve it for them, and "elide[s] important questions about public entitlement to Indigenous culture."
