= Aisha Alfa =

Canadian actress

Aisha Alfa is a Canadian comedian and actress, best known for her recurring role as teacher Ms. Grell in the Degrassi franchise and her appearances as a reporter on the mock newscast series The Beaverton.

Born in Nigeria and raised in Winnipeg, Manitoba, she is the sister of musician and radio broadcaster Ismaila Alfa, and played soccer in her youth before pursuing her career as an entertainer. After winning Winnipeg's "Funniest Person with a Day Job" comedy competition in 2011, she moved to Toronto to further her career. She appeared in the films An American Girl: McKenna Shoots for the Stars, My Awkward Sexual Adventure and Euphoria, and was a regular panelist on the eighth and ninth seasons of MuchMusic's Video on Trial, before joining the cast of CBC Television's annual Royal Canadian Air Farce New Year's Eve specials in 2014. She remained with the troupe through to the 2016 special.

She has since appeared in the television series Opie's Home, Sorry for Your Loss, Coop & Cami Ask the World and Good Trouble.

She released her first full-length comedy special, Aisha Alfa: All the Parts, in 2020 on All Things Comedy.

She was a Canadian Comedy Award nominee for Best Breakout Artist at the 16th Canadian Comedy Awards in 2015. Alfa and her Beaverton castmates Emma Hunter, Miguel Rivas, Marilla Wex and Dave Barclay received a Canadian Screen Award nomination for Best Ensemble Performance in a Variety or Sketch Comedy Program or Series at the 6th Canadian Screen Awards in 2018.
