= Harsha Walia =

Canadian activist and writer

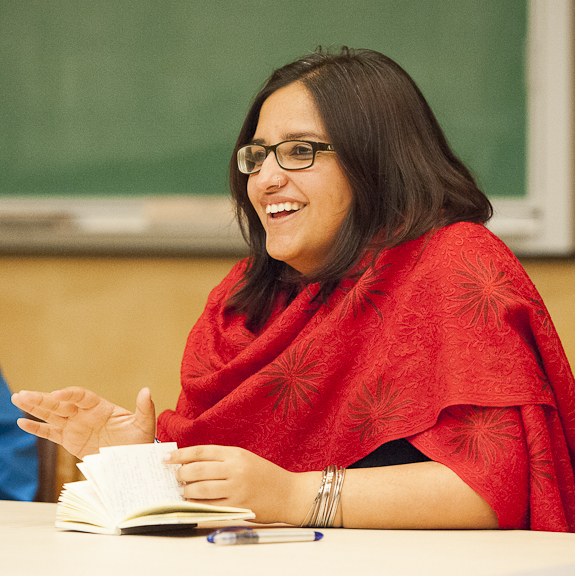
- Harsha Walia in 2013
- Born: Bahrain
- Education: University of British Columbia
- Occupations: Activist, writer

Harsha Walia is a Canadian activist and writer based in Vancouver. She has been involved with No one is illegal, the February 14 Women's Memorial March Committee, the Downtown Eastside Women's Centre, and several Downtown Eastside housing justice coalitions. Walia served as Executive Director of the BC Civil Liberties Association (BCCLA) in 2020. Walia has been active in immigration politics, Indigenous rights, feminist, anti-racist, anti-statist, and anti-capitalist movements for over a decade. She has also contributed to over thirty academic journals, anthologies, magazines, and newspapers.

== Early life ==
Walia was born in Bahrain to parents of Indian Punjabi ancestry. She later immigrated to Vancouver, Canada and studied law at the University of British Columbia.

== Activism ==
=== No One Is Illegal ===
In 2001, Walia co-founded No One Is Illegal, an anti-colonial, anti-racist, and anti-capitalist migrant justice movement. In addition to providing direct support for refugees and migrants facing detention and deportation, NOII campaigns for full legal status and access to social services for all people and works in solidarity with Indigenous self-determination, "anti-occupation", and grassroots anti-oppression movements. Although Walia has worked with NOII groups across Canada, she is primarily associated with NOII-Vancouver. She is a previous member of NOII-Montreal and has assisted the Pakistani Action Committee Against Racial Profiling (Montreal) and Refugees against Racial Profiling (Vancouver).

As a member of NOII, Walia has been involved in several sanctuary campaigns alongside communities and organizers from immigrant and racialized backgrounds. She participated in the campaign to stop the deportation of Laibar Singh, a paralyzed Punjabi refugee; the Let them Free, Let them Stay campaign for incarcerated Tamil refugee claimants aboard the MV Ocean Lady and MV Sun Sea; and the Campaign to Stop Secret Trials, calling for the abolition of security certificates. Together with NOII-Vancouver, Walia organizes the Annual Community March Against Racism, which was initiated in 2008. She also collectively organized a No One Is Illegal, Canada Is Illegal contingent as part the 2010 No Olympics On Stolen Native Land convergence in Vancouver.

In January 2014, Walia and NOII-Vancouver demanded an inquest into the death of Lucia Vega Jimenez, an undocumented Mexican refugee who lived and worked in Vancouver, who died in Canada Border Services Agency (CBSA) custody four weeks after being detained. Other migrant justice and civil liberties groups and more than 7,500 petition signers also called for an inquest, which was announced by BC Coroners Service in February 2014 and led to several jury recommendations and an overhaul of CBSA detention practices. In view of the Metro Vancouver Transit Police's involvement in Jimenez's incarceration, Walia co-founded the Transportation Not Deportation campaign, which brought about the end of a memorandum of understanding between Transit Police and the CBSA. Transportation Not Deportation was awarded the 2016 Liberty Award for Community Activism by the BC Civil Liberties Association.

After Donald Trump's election and signing of Executive Order 13769 on January 27, 2017, to establish "extreme vetting" procedures for refugees and immigrants attempting to enter the United States, Walia reported a greater volume of incoming calls to NOII from undocumented migrants in the US seeking to claim asylum in Canada. She has stated that, despite many government-sponsored messages that Canada is welcoming to refugees, the Safe Third Country Agreement (STCA) prevents those who reach the Canadian border via the US from claiming refugee status. Consequently, she has added, many people cross irregularly into British Columbia, where they are often intercepted by the Royal Canadian Mounted Police. NOII has urged the Trudeau government to repeal the STCA, although the agreement currently remains in effect. In April 2017, NOII-Vancouver released and distributed Border Rights for Refugees, a pamphlet available in 17 languages with information for those seeking asylum in Canada.

Walia and NOII-Vancouver also worked with the Burnaby School District to change registration procedures in 2017, with the aim to implement a reform that stipulated that all children, regardless of immigration status, have full access to school.

=== Women's Memorial March ===
For over a decade, Walia has worked with the February 14th Women's Memorial March Committee, founded in 1992 following the murder of a woman on Powell Street in Vancouver. Led largely by Indigenous women, the committee organizes the annual February 14 Women's Memorial March for women who have died in Vancouver's Downtown Eastside (DTES). A 20-year history of the Women's Memorial March is documented in a 2011 short film co-directed by Walia and Alejandro Zuluaga, titled Survival, Strength, Sisterhood: Power of Women in the Downtown Eastside. The film presents footage of recent and previous marches and centres the voices of women in the DTES, including members of the Downtown Eastside Power of Women Group, who developed the concept for the film. With their film, Walia and Zuluaga seek to "debunk the sensationalism surrounding a neighbourhood deeply misunderstood, and celebrate the complex and diverse realities of women organizing for justice."

=== Downtown Eastside Women's Centre ===
From 2006 to 2019, Walia worked as a project coordinator at the Downtown Eastside Women's Centre (DEWC), established in 1978 as a safe, community-driven space for women and children in the DTES of Vancouver. The centre offers support through daily drop-in and emergency shelters, as well as food, advocacy, counselling, and housing outreach services. At the DEWC, Walia facilitated the Power of Women (POW) group, a program run for and by women living in the DTES. POW organizes weekly community discussions and actions with the goal of identifying, resisting, and transforming rhetoric and policies that marginalize women. POW is upheld by leadership and involvement of women most affected by systemic injustice, particularly homelessness, abuse, and child apprehension; the group's work, Walia says, is therefore "rooted in the experiences and voices of residents of the DTES."

Walia and the Power of Women group have pressured the Vancouver Police Department to investigate and act on cases of missing and murdered women. They are also involved in numerous housing justice campaigns and coalitions, including the Downtown Eastside Is Not for Developers Coalition. The year 2006 marked the beginning of POW's Annual Women's Housing March for safe and affordable housing for low-income residents of the DTES.

=== Indigenous Land Defence ===
With NOII-Vancouver, Walia has assisted the Skwelkwek'welt Protection Centre since 2003 and the Sutikalh Protection Camp since 2004 in their fights against resort and hotel construction on Secwepemc and Stʼatʼimc lands. She has convened Immigrants in Support of Idle No More and is a supporter of the Defenders of the Land Network, the Indigenous Assembly Against Mining and Pipelines, and the Unist’ot’en Action Camp in Wet’suwet’en territory, which she has visited on multiple occasions.

=== Olympic Resistance Network ===
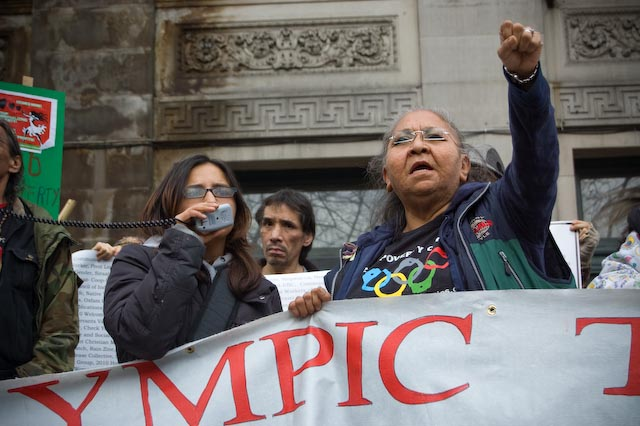
Walia (left) at a Pigeon Park rally for the Olympic Tent Village, Vancouver 2010

Walia was active in the Olympic Resistance Network (ORN), which instigated several anti-Olympic actions and demonstrations during the 2010 Winter Olympic Games in Vancouver. The actions were in response to growing homelessness rates of low-income residents in the DTES and cuts to social programs due to urban gentrification in the build-up to the games. The Women's Memorial March Committee and Power of Women group also resisted the Games by refusing to cancel or reroute the annual February 14 Women's Memorial March and obstructing the Olympic Torch Relay as it passed through the DTES.

In alliance with numerous other groups, the ORN organized a No Olympics on Stolen Land convergence and several rallies, such as No More Empty Talk, No More Empty Lots. During the latter event, held on February 15, 2010, a tent city known as the Olympic Tent Village was assembled on a lot owned by real estate developer Concord Pacific, which functioned as a parking lot during the Olympics. With the support of DTES elders, residents, activists, and organizations, including the Power of Women group, the site served as a community shelter and gathering place from which BC Housing was pressured to provide safe and affordable homes for those in the village. Over 40 homeless residents were housed as a result of the two-week-long Olympic Tent Village.

Following an anti-Olympic demonstration on February 13, 2010, during which black bloc tactics were employed and windows of the Hudson's Bay Company (an Olympic sponsor) in Downtown Vancouver were smashed, Walia defended the protestors, stating that several of them are "devoted activists who support marginalized communities" and adopt "a range of tactics to do so." She also expressed that wearing masks during protests "is a reasonable precaution in light of mass surveillance practices" and that black bloc tactics can "increase the effectiveness of less direct actions such as the February 14th Women's Memorial March."

=== Other activism ===
An active member within Vancouver's South Asian community, with whom she aims to "lift up the reality of what's going on in South Asia in terms of the global landscape of geopolitical warfare," Walia is on the board of the South Asian Network for Secularism and Democracy. She has been involved in Anti-Capitalist Convergence and the Northwest Anti-Authoritarian People of Colour Network, sits on the board of Shit Harper Did, and is a youth mentor for Check Your Head.

=== Arrests ===
Along with two other women, Walia was arrested on October 4, 2010, a National Day of Action for Missing and Murdered Indigenous Women and Girls, after occupying a Vancouver police station to demand an investigation into the death of Ashley Machiskinic. The group was promised a meeting with the chief of police, but the three refused to leave. The three detained women were released the following day.

== Controversies ==
On June 30, 2021, controversy arose after Walia, while serving as Executive Director of the BC Civil Liberties Association, retweeted a Twitter news article from Vice World News on the burning of two Catholic churches, adding the comment: "Burn it all down". Her tweet was condemned by British Columbia's Public Safety Minister Mike Farnworth as "disgusting and reprehensible." Calls were made for Walia's resignation and for her to issue an apology. Walia said that she was not supporting arson; she said that "Burn it all down" meant "a call to dismantle all structures of violence, including the state, settler-colonialism, empire, the border etc." She received support from the Union of British Columbia Indian Chiefs (UBCIC), though the statement released by the UBCIC did not mention the tweet itself. She resigned as executive director of the BC Civil Liberties Association over the issue on July 16, 2021.

In 2023, Walia received criticism for comments made at a rally supporting Palestine where she said: "how beautiful is the spirit to get free that Palestinians literally learned how to fly on hang gliders." This was in reference to paragliders being used in the Hamas attack on Israel on October 7, 2023.

== Publications ==
=== Undoing Border Imperialism ===
Undoing Border Imperialism is Walia's first book, published in 2013 as part of AK Press's Anarchist Intervention Series. The book features a foreword by Andrea Smith and contributions by over 30 activists and cultural producers, including Carmen Aguirre, Leah Lakshmi Piepzna-Samarasinha, and Melanie Cervantes.

In the book's later chapters, Walia chronicles the efforts of numerous movements, such as No One Is Illegal, that seek to undo border imperialism. She examines the "bordered logic within our own movements" and discusses ways movements can decolonize and grow through self-reflection, leadership from those directly affected by systemic injustice, and long-term solidarity with Indigenous communities and other justice-seeking movements.

=== Never Home: Legislating Discrimination in Canadian Immigration ===
In 2015, Walia and Omar Chu co-authored Never Home: Legislating Discrimination in Canadian Immigration, a report on the impact of Canadian immigration policies implemented by the Conservative government during Stephen Harper's nine-year tenure. The report was part of an "innovative" and collaborative multimedia project by NOII-Vancouver and Shit Harper Did, which included a series of refugee and migrant stories in video form and "put a human face on the impact of the drastic changes made by the Conservative government" with regard to citizenship, temporary foreign workers, family reunification, detention, refugees, deportation, security measures, and funding.

=== Red Women Rising: Indigenous Women Survivors in Vancouver's Downtown Eastside ===
Co-authored by Walia and Carol Muree Martin with contributions by 128 members of the Downtown Eastside Women's Centre, Red Women Rising: Indigenous Women Survivors in Vancouver's Downtown Eastside is a 216-page report on gendered colonial violence in Canada. The report discusses Indigenous women's unmediated voices, knowledge, and experiences of violence, displacement, family trauma, poverty, homelessness, child apprehension, policing, health inequities, and the opioid crisis and was submitted to the National Inquiry into Missing and Murdered Indigenous Women and Girls. Released in April 2019 by the DEWC, Red Women Rising brings together the direct input of 113 Indigenous women and 15 non-Indigenous women participants in the DTES, with reviews of published research and over 200 recommendations on how to end state and societal violence against Indigenous women, girls, transgender, and two-spirit people.

=== Border and Rule: Global Migration, Capitalism, and the Rise of Racist Nationalism ===
In Border and Rule: Global Migration, Capitalism, and the Rise of Racist Nationalism, published in February 2021 by Haymarket Books, Walia further develops her internationalist analysis of migration. In it, Walia is critical both of Republican U.S. presidents such as Donald Trump, for his xenophobic immigration policies and efforts to build a wall at the U.S.-Mexico border, and Democratic presidents Bill Clinton and Barack Obama. She contextualizes her arguments around immigration by noting neoliberal leaders' predisposition for free trade over free migration. "Centrists like Bill Clinton, Barack Obama and Joe Biden have proven they too are 'tough on immigration' by securing the border against people, while commodities and capital move freely." The book features an afterword by Nick Estes and a foreword by Robin D. G. Kelley. It was reviewed in The New York Review of Books by American environmentalist Bill McKibben, who posits that Walia argues that "immigration should be better understood as reparations."

The book was the winner of the Jim Deva Prize for Writing that Provokes from the BC and Yukon Book Prizes in 2022.

== Selected works ==
- Undoing Border Imperialism (2013)
- Border and Rule: Global Migration, Capitalism, and the Rise of Racist Nationalism (2021)
- Never Home: Legislating Discrimination in Canadian Immigration (2015, co-author)
- Red Women Rising: Indigenous Women Survivors in Vancouver's Downtown Eastside (2019)

== Bibliography ==
- Walia, Harsha (2013). Undoing border imperialism. Institute for Anarchist Studies. Oakland, CA. ISBN 978-1-84935-134-8. OCLC 829056735.
