= Seán Devlin =

Canadian comedian and filmmaker

Seán Yap Sei-Been Devlin
- Occupations: comedian, writer
- Years active: 2010s-present

Seán Yap Sei-Been Devlin (叶 世民) is a Filipino-Canadian comedian, writer, filmmaker and activist based in Vancouver, British Columbia. He is most noted for his second feature film, Asog, which debuted at the 2023 Tribeca Film Festival. He was a Juno Award nominee for Comedy Album of the Year at the Juno Awards of 2022 for his debut comedy album Airports, Animals.

== Film ==
His debut feature was 2018's When the Storm Fades, for which he won the Emerging Canadian Director award at the 2018 Vancouver International Film Festival. In 2023 Devlin's second feature Asog was a selection of the Cannes Docs-in-progress showcase, had its World Premiere at the Tribeca Film Festival and was an official selection of SXSW Sydney and the 67th BFI London Film Festival. It also screened in competition at the 39th Warsaw Film Festival and the 54th Goa International Film Festival. Time Magazine described the film's impact as "a remarkable victory of society’s poorest over entrenched corporate interests." The film features residents of Sicogon Island who had their land stolen in the aftermath of the storm by the country's largest real estate company Ayala Land Inc. Private armed militia allegedly forced 6,000 people to abandon their ancestral land so the corporations could build a luxury resort. After Asog’s success on the festival circuit, Ayala paid $5.1 million USD in reparations to 784 displaced families who had refused to leave the island. Most of the money was used to build 474 new storm-resistant homes. The Ayala conglomerate allegedly sabotaged the film's Filipino premiere leading Rolling Stone Philippines to dub the film "The Biggest Movie That The Philippines has Never Seen".

He worked as a Consulting Producer on Borat: Subsequent Moviefilm.

== Tactical Media ==
He was one of the creators of Shit Harper Did, a satirical website critical of the government of Stephen Harper, in the early 2010s. The website became a multiyear tactical media campaign that used humor, satire, digital media, pranks and political interventions to critique the Conservative government led by Prime Minister Stephen Harper. The website ShitHarperDid.com went viral following its launch in April 2011, receiving over a million hits within hours. In its first three days, the website attracted over 4.1 million visitors, and one of its videos became the most-shared content on YouTube in Canada at the time. Canadian celebrities Margaret Atwood and Elliot Page were early online supporters of the campaign. The project garnered attention for its ability to damage the public image of the Conservatives, with Postmedia noting that it was "wreaking havoc on the Conservative Party's closely orchestrated election output." The campaign was created to engage youth using sociological insights and a strategy built around humor.

=== Reception ===
The project was popular with young demographics who did not typically engage in politics. The Globe and Mail described the project as a "stealth campaign that's been spreading like prairie wildfire." The Huffington Post called it "the viral phenomenon that captured the digital zeitgeist."

=== Infiltrations of prime minister's security detail ===
In 2014, ShitHarperDid co-creator Sean Devlin and activist Shireen Soofi disguised themselves as waiters and infiltrated Prime Minister Stephen Harper's security detail at a private event. According to media they came within "stabbing distance" of the prime minister before displaying signs protesting the government's inaction on climate change. The action sparked national debate on climate change policy. Devlin and SHD organizer Brigette Depape appeared on CBC News Network's Power and Politics to discuss the action. Following the interview, the program hosted a panel featuring elected officials from the NDP, the Liberal Party, and the Conservative government to debate the cost of climate change. During the discussion, Conservative MP Peter Braid acknowledged a link between extreme weather events and climate change. CBC reported this as the first instance of a federal Conservative MP acknowledging this scientific link. CBC host Even Solomon asked Braid to confirm he was saying that extreme weather and climate change are related, Braid answered, "Absolutely, I'm confirming I said that." The NDP and Liberal MPs were both surprised by the statement.

In 2015, Devlin once again bypassed the prime minister's security at a Conservative campaign event. This time, he disguised himself in a blazer and was invited on stage to stand behind Harper. Beneath his jacket, he wore a shirt featuring a message critical of the Conservative government's immigration policies. Security intervened after noticing the shirt, and Devlin was arrested for resisting arrest and obstruction of justice.

=== Impact ===
The multiyear campaign was part of a broader progressive movement that engaged young Canadians in the political process. By the time the project ended in 2015 there had been an unprecedented increase in youth voting. Turnout among this group increased 18.3 points, to 57.1 per cent compared to 38.8 per cent in 2011. This wave of newly engaged youth voters is credited with ushering the Conservative Party out of power after nine years in power.

=== Controversy ===
The group's ability to infiltrate the prime minister's security caused national debate on security protocols for public officials. Conservative Senator Bob Runciman condemned the act and called for harsher penalties for such breaches, suggesting that Devlin and Soofi should face indictable offenses with significant fines or imprisonment. However, no formal charges were laid.

Elections Canada briefly investigated Devlin and the group regarding the site's compliance with Canada's third party election advertising laws. The laws require any entity that spends over $500 on election advertising to register with Elections Canada, but ShitHarperDid.com was initially created for under $250, relying on the volunteer efforts of those involved. Elections Canada made no formal charges and no violations were found.

== Comedy ==
Sean's debut standup comedy album Airports, Animals was released by Arts & Crafts Productions in 2021 as the label's first-ever comedy album. He has performed on television in a third-season episode of CBC's The New Wave of Standup and a season 23 episode of CBC's Winnipeg Comedy Festival Gala.
