= Molly McGlynn =

Canadian film and television director, and screenwriter

- Born: Montreal, Quebec, Canada
- Occupations: Director, screenwriter
- Years active: 2010–present

Molly McGlynn is a Canadian American film and television director and screenwriter. She is known for her feature films Mary Goes Round, for which she won the Jay Scott Prize from the Toronto Film Critics Association, and Fitting In, which won the award for Best Canadian Film at the 2023 Vancouver International Film Festival.

== Early life ==
Originally from Montreal, Quebec, McGlynn and her family moved to New Jersey when she was five. She grew up in the United States but returned to Canada for university. McGlynn studied film at Queen’s University in Kingston, Ontario and television writing and production at Humber College in Toronto.

== Career ==
McGlynn began her career making short films, including Office Daydreams, I Am Not a Weird Person, Shoes, Given Your History, and 3-Way (Not Calling). In 2013, Shoes tracked the life cycle of a pair of shoes and earned her a nomination for Best Short Film at the Female Eye Film Festival. 3-Way (Not Calling)—which stars Emma Hunter, Kristian Bruun, and Emily Coutts—premiered at the 2016 Toronto International Film Festival.

In 2017, McGlynn made her feature film directorial debut with Mary Goes Round, starring Aya Cash. She developed the screenplay at the Canadian Film Centre. It was screened in the Discovery section at the 2017 Toronto International Film Festival. The film centres on Mary, a substance abuse counsellor who loses her job after getting arrested for drunk driving. Returning to her hometown to visit her estranged father, she struggles to cope with the revelations that her father is terminally ill and that she has a teenage half-sister she has never met. For her work on the film, McGlynn won the Jay Scott Prize for emerging filmmakers from the Toronto Film Critics Association.

In 2018, she directed episodes of the web series How to Buy a Baby, for which she won the Indie Series Award for Best Directing — Comedy at the 9th Indie Series Awards. Since then, she has directed episodes of the television series Workin' Moms, Bad Blood, Speechless, Little Dog, Grown-ish, Bless This Mess, The Wonder Years, Kenan and Animal Control.

McGlynn received Toronto International Film Festival's Micki Moore Residency in 2020. She wrote and directed the film Fitting In, starring Maddie Ziegler and Emily Hampshire, which premiered at South by Southwest under the name Bloody Hell on March 13, 2023.

Her 2023 feature film Fitting In premiered at SXSW, and won the award for Best Canadian Film at the 2023 Vancouver International Film Festival.
