= Starwalker =

2025 Canadian musical drama film

- Directed by: Corey Payette
- Written by: Corey Payette
- Based on: Starwalker by Corey Payette
- Produced by: Fabian Aspell Morales; Corey Payette
- Starring: Dillan Chiblow; Jeffrey Michael Follis; Stewart Adam McKensy
- Cinematography: Parham Banafsheh; Ian Mrozewski
- Edited by: Christian Díaz Durán
- Music by: Corey Payette
- Production company: Urban Ink Productions
- Release date: May 23, 2025 (Inside Out)
- Running time: 113 minutes
- Country: Canada
- Language: English

Starwalker is a Canadian musical comedy-drama film, directed by Corey Payette and released in 2025. An adaptation of his own 2023 stage musical, the film stars Dillan Chiblow as the Star, a homeless Indigenous teenager who finds community and acceptance after he meets Levi (Jeffrey Michael Follis) and is introduced to the House of Borealis, a drag house presided over by Mother Borealis (Stewart Adam McKensy).

The cast also includes Jason Sakaki, Jennifer Lines, Connor Parnall, Emma Slipp, Ralph Escamillan, Hank Pine and Jesse Alvarez in supporting roles.

The film premiered at the 2025 Inside Out Film and Video Festival. It was also screened in the Borsos Competition program at the 2025 Whistler Film Festival.
