= My Dead Mom =

Canadian comedy series

- Promotional poster
- Genre: Comedy
- Created by: Wendy Litner
- Written by: Wendy Litner
- Directed by: Chandler Levack
- Starring: Lauren Collins; Megan Follows
- Country of origin: Canada
- Original language: English
- No. of seasons: 1
- No. of episodes: 7

Production
- Running time: 11–18 minutes
- Production company: LoCo Motion Pictures

Original release
- Network: Crave
- Release: November 1, 2024

My Dead Mom is a Canadian comedy web series, which premiered in 2024 on Crave. The series stars Lauren Collins as Emmy, a Jewish Canadian woman still struggling to move forward in life after the death of her mother Fern, played by Megan Follows, three years earlier. Fern still regularly appears to her in spirit form to criticize and question Emmy's life choices.

The cast also includes Rainbow Sun Francks, David Reale, Daniel Maslany, Jenny Raven, Nadine Djoury, John Stocker, Naomi Snieckus, Daniel Kash, Lynne Griffin, Matt Murray, Tammy Isbell, Brandon Ash-Mohammed, Nigel Downer, Anna Mirodin, Miguel Rivas, Sharjil Rasool, Daniel Kipnis, Riya Malik, and Theo Freeman in supporting roles.

The series was created and written by Wendy Litner, and directed by Chandler Levack.

== Awards ==
Award	Date of ceremony	Category	Recipient(s)	Result	Ref.
Canadian Screen Awards	2025	Best Original Program or Series, Fiction	Lauren Corber, Palmer Baranek, Wendy Litner	Nominated	
Canadian Screen Awards	2025	Best Lead Performance in a Web Program or Series	Lauren Collins	Nominated	
Canadian Screen Awards	2025	Best Lead Performance in a Web Program or Series	Megan Follows	Won	
Canadian Screen Awards	2025	Best Supporting Performance in a Web Program or Series	Rainbow Sun Francks	Nominated	
Canadian Screen Awards	2025	Best Supporting Performance in a Web Program or Series	Daniel Maslany	Nominated	
Canadian Screen Awards	2025	Best Supporting Performance in a Web Program or Series	Jenny Raven	Nominated	
Canadian Screen Awards	2025	Best Picture Editing in a Web Program or Series	Maureen Grant, "Shana Tova:"	Won	
Canadian Screen Awards	2025	Best Writing in a Web Program or Series	Wendy Litner, "Shana Tova"	Won	
Rockie Award	2025	Best Short Form Series	Lauren Corber, Palmer Baranek, Wendy Litner	Won	
International Emmy Awards	2025	Best Short Form Series	Lauren Corber, Palmer Baranek, Wendy Litner	Nominated	
