= Les Filles du Roi (film) =

2023 Canadian musical drama film

- Directed by: Corey Payette
- Written by: Corey Payette; Julie McIsaac
- Based on: Les Filles du Roi by Corey Payette and Julie McIsaac
- Produced by: Garrett Van Dusen
- Starring: Julie McIsaac; Kaitlyn Yott; Raes Calvert
- Cinematography: Parham Banafsheh; Ian Mrozewski
- Edited by: Christian Díaz Durán
- Music by: Corey Payette
- Production company: Urban Ink Productions
- Release date: October 5, 2023 (VIFF)
- Running time: 102 minutes
- Country: Canada
- Language: English

Les Filles du Roi (French pronunciation: [le fij dy ʁwa]) is a Canadian musical drama film, directed by Corey Payette and released in 2023. Written by Payette and Julie McIsaac, the film presents a feminist and Indigenous spin on the colonization of Canada through the story of Marie-Jeanne Lespérance (Julie McIsaac), a French fille du roi in New France in the 17th century, and her emerging friendships with Kateri (Kaitlyn Yott) and Jean-Baptiste (Raes Calvert), a Mohawk sister and brother in the fur trade.

The supporting cast includes Claire Johnstone, Jessica Carmichael, Oliver Castillo, Merewyn Comeau, Cecilly Day, Laura Di Cicco, Victor Dolhai, Kayla Dunbar, Lisa Goebel, Nathan Kay, Asivak Koostachin, Jennifer Lines, Olivia Lucas, Pippa Mackie and Matthew Mahihkan.

Set at a fort in 17th century Quebec, the film was adapted by Payette and McIsaac from their 2018 stage musical of the same name. It features dialogue and songs in English, French and Mohawk languages, and stars the same core cast as the original production. Payette opted to make the film after the COVID-19 pandemic forced the cancellation of the stage musical's national tour in 2020.

The film premiered in the Northern Lights program at the 2023 Vancouver International Film Festival. It was later screened at the 2024 Reelworld Film Festival, where Payette won the award for Outstanding Writing in a Feature Film.
