= Drop (loyalty program) =

Coalition customer loyalty program

Drop Technologies Inc
- Company type: Private
- Founded: August 25, 2015; 11 years ago
- Dissolved: 2026
- Headquarters: Toronto, Ontario
- Creators: Derrick Fung, Darren Fung, Cameron Dearsley, Akhil Gupta
- Industry: Loyalty program
- Website: joindrop.com
- Native clients on: iOS and Android

Drop was a coalition customer loyalty program, in which users earn points using their linked debit or credit cards. Users choose five rewards partners such as Sephora, Starbucks, Uber, and Whole Foods Market to earn points with. The program started in the Canadian market during August 2015 and expanded into the American market during October 2017, after a six-month private beta. The Drop Rewards program requires that users download a companion app on an iOS or Android device. According to Drop, the service was designed as a way for brands to earn exposure with millennials.

As of November 2017, the company had 500,000 users. The number rose to 1 million users by January 2018.

As of 2026, the app has ceased to open or function, and previously-synced credit cards fail to connect.

== Funding ==
In August 2015, Drop raised a CA$1 million round of initial financing for launching the app.

In October 2017, Drop raised a $5.5 million seed round of venture capital financing led by Sierra Ventures. As part of the deal, Mark Fernandes joined Drop's Board.

In February 2018, the company announced that they had raised a US$21 million series A round, led by New Enterprise Associates. Later that year Drop acquired customer analytics company Canopy Labs.

In August 2019, the company announced their series B round which was a total of US$44 million, led by HOF Capital and Royal Bank of Canada (RBC) participated as a strategic investor.

As of July 2023 the app has experienced a number of issues. One notable issue is a change in how the distribution of gift cards, which were once available to purchase at any time, is handled. Gift cards are now supposedly dropped every Thursday, and are "limited and capped at $25". Thousands of subscribers have reported that they have been unable to cash in their funds due to the app either taking a long time to load, or not loading at all, and then being told that the gift cards are “sold out”. Multiple users have even stated the gift cards aren't even dropped because they never seem to show up. The company has not made any comments on the matter.

On September 13, 2024, a lawsuit was filed against Drop Technologies Inc. in the US District Court for the central California region.
