= Pat Dussault =

Pat Dussault is a Canadian television comedy writer, sketch comedian and actor. He has written for a number of Canadian shows, including Just for Laughs and This Hour Has 22 Minutes.

== Early life ==
Dussault was born in Montreal, Quebec, and raised in Mount Royal. He played hockey as a child and later attended Lower Canada College and Marianopolis College. He earned a degree in philosophy from Queen's University.

== Career ==
Dussault lived in Toronto from 2004 to 2009. He began his career writing comedy galas and television specials for the Just for Laughs comedy festival in 2013. He has since written material for Sir Patrick Stewart, and various other comedians and guests on comedy shows. Most notably, Dussault wrote PK Subban: Shots Fired, a comedy fundraiser hosted by NHL all-star PK Subban, which was named Best Variety Special at the 2018 Canadian Screen Awards, and raised over $130,000 for the Montreal Children's Hospital Foundation

Dussault is also known for his work on the satirical news show This Hour Has 22 Minutes; he was one of the writers who won a Canadian Comedy Award for Best Writing in TV Series or Special for an episode of the show. He also wrote for the television series The Beaverton.

Dussault has earned two Canadian Screen Award nominations for Best Writing, Variety or Sketch Comedy.

=== Twitter Controversy ===
On June 20, 2018, Dussault jokingly tweeted a suggestion that Donald Trump's granddaughter Chloe be placed in one of the internment camps that the Trump Administration uses to detain migrant children who are separated from their parents at the U.S.-Mexico border. This triggered a backlash from many media outlets and pundits, some of whom characterized the tweet as a threat against the President's family. Dussault deleted the tweet and apologized that same day, but not before it had been read and recorded many times.
