= Loran Scholars Foundation =

Canadian charitable organization

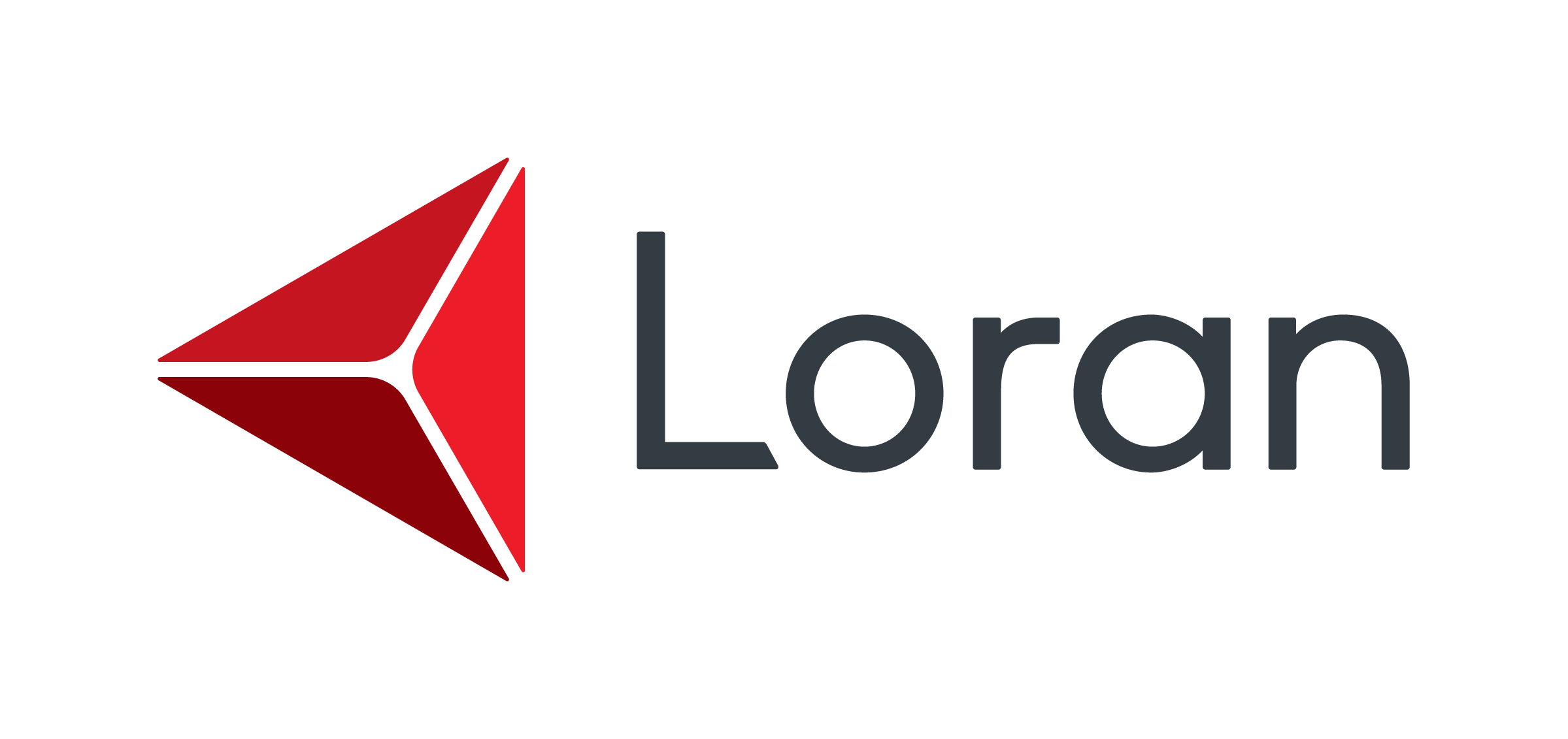
- Formation: 1988
- Headquarters: Toronto, Ontario, Canada
- Official language: English, French
- CEO: Meghan Moore (Loran Scholar '98)
- Key people: Robert Cluett (Founder); Mike Johnston (Chair)
- Website: www.loranscholar.ca

The Loran Scholars Foundation is a national charitable organization founded in 1988 that selects 36 students entering university in Canada each year for the Loran Award. The Foundation looks beyond grades to identify values-driven youth who demonstrate strength of character, a deep commitment to service, and exceptional leadership potential. It was founded by Robert Cluett in 1988 as the Canada Merit Scholarship Foundation (CMSF), and renamed the Loran Scholars Foundation in February 2007.

== Loran Scholars ==
The Loran Scholars Foundation selects up to 36 students each year for an undergraduate scholarship valued at $100,000. It has been active since 1990.

The scholarship is tenable at 25 public universities throughout Canada; however, the lower secondary and tertiary awards (finalist awards and provincial & territorial awards) can be used at any public Canadian university or college. Twenty-five Loran Scholars have gone on to win Rhodes Scholarships. It consists of annual stipends, a matching tuition waiver, summer internship funding, annual retreats and scholar gatherings, and mentoring over four years of study.

=== Candidate selection ===
The Loran Scholar selection process is rigorous:

- Applications are open to all graduating students in high schools and CEGEPs across Canada and consist of a written application submitted electronically; the deadline is in early October. The Loran Award typically receives more than 5000 applications annually.
- Shortlisted applicants will then be invited to submit supplementary video recording answers.
- From there, shortlisted applicants (roughly 250 students) will be selected for semi-final interviews consisting of one-on-one and panel style interviews hosted online. They are from regions across Canada and all semi-final interviews are conducted over the course of four weeks.
- Up to 90 finalists are invited from across Canada to attend two days of National Selections in Toronto.
- Up to 36 candidates are selected as Loran Scholars. In addition, up to 54 finalists who were not selected receive a Finalist Award of $6,000, and up to 70 semi-finalists receive Provincial/Territorial Awards of $3,000.

=== Notable alumni ===
Since the organization was established, the Foundation has selected 825 Loran Scholars. Past Loran Scholars include Lucas Skoczkowski, founder and former CEO of Redknee and current founder and managing partner at Red Lane Group ; vice president of communications and external relations at Hydro-Québec Graham Fox; World Bank operations advisor Sarah Michael; François Cadieux, a research aerospace engineer at NASA Advanced Supercomputing Division; clinician-scientist, media personality, and associate professor in the Department of Medicine at the University of Toronto Samir Gupta; award-winning director, playwright and actor Andrew Kushnir; Eloise Tan, vice president of inclusion, sustainability and engagement at the Canadian Blood Services; David-Martin Milot, president of Doctors of the World Canada and co-founder of Young Physicians for Public Health; and climate planner Brigette DePape.

Many Loran Scholars have been recognized for their impact. Patrick Hickey received the Young Humanitarian Award from the Canadian Red Cross. Afzal Habib, co-founder of Kidogo, and Stephen Lake, co-founder and CEO of Thalmic Labs were on Forbes 30 Under 30 list. Amy Tan and Lauren Albrecht were featured on Avenue Magazine's Top 40 list, for Calgary and Edmonton, respectively. London-based visual artist Raine Storey received the British Art Award – Peoples Choice at the 2021 London Biennale. Breanne Everett, CEO and co-founder of Orpyx has been awarded the Governor General’s Innovation Award, Alberta Women Entrepreneur Upsurge Entrepreneur Award, the Calgary Award in Commerce, Avenue Magazine’s Top 40 Under 40, one of the Top 100 Most Powerful Women in Canada, the University of Calgary’s Graduate of the Last Decade, and Alberta Business Hall of Fame’s Innovator Award Recipient.

=== Awards ===
Several awards are granted by the foundation, on the basis of character, service, and leadership potential:

- Loran Award: up to 36 students are selected each year for the Loran Award, which is valued at more than $100,000 over four years of undergraduate study, offering an annual $12,000 living stipend, a $12,000 tuition waiver, and up to $14,000 for three tri-sectoral summer internships
- Loran Finalist Award: $6,000 awards offered to up to 54 qualified finalists who attend National Selections but are not selected as Loran Award recipients
- Loran Provincial/Territorial Award: $3,000 awards offered by semi-final committees to up to 70 outstanding candidates who are not asked to attend national selections
- Honour Citation: granted to students who distinguish themselves at semi-final interviews but are not offered any monetary awards
- Semi-Finalist Certificate: issued to students selected for a semi-final interview

Loran Scholars may study at the following universities in Canada:

Atlantic Canada: Dalhousie University, Memorial University, Mount Allison University, University of King's College, University of New Brunswick.

Québec: McGill University, Université Laval, Université de Montréal, Université de Sherbrooke.

Ontario: McMaster University, Toronto Metropolitan University, Queen's University, University of Guelph, University of Ottawa, University of Toronto, University of Waterloo, Western University, York University.

Prairies: University of Alberta, University of Calgary, University of Manitoba, University of Saskatchewan.

British Columbia: Simon Fraser University, University of British Columbia, University of Victoria.

=== Experiential value ===
A unique aspect of the Loran Award is the mentorship program, where each Loran Scholar is paired with a mentor who is a business or community leader. Current and former mentors include ACE Bakery founder Martin Connell, OC, O.Ont; Canadian senator Hon. Landon Pearson; former Ontario Premier Bob Rae; social entrepreneur Scott Gilmore; Second Cup co-founder Frank O'Dea; Dr. Alice Chan-Yip, C.M. of the Montreal Children's Hospital; TV host Lindsay Cameron Wilson; and McMaster professor Dr. Gary Warner.

Furthermore, the Loran Scholars Foundation offers funding for three summer internships:

- Enterprise Summer
- Not-For-Profit Summer
- Public Policy Summer

Summer employers have included the World Health Organization, the United Nations High Commissioner for Refugees, the Mãori Law Review, BMO Capital Markets, VIA Rail, McKinsey & Company, the Canadian Urban Institute, Frontier College, the Government of Ontario, the Government of Nunavut, Samaritan's Purse and several alumni-founded companies such as Redknee and Canopy Labs.

== W. Garfield Weston Award ==
The Loran Scholars Foundation previously administered the W. Garfield Weston Award for outstanding college-bound students in Canada. Established in 1999 with the support of the W. Garfield Weston Foundation, it awarded up to 25 scholarships to entering college students, and up to 25 scholarships to upper-year college students. The foundation selected its final class of W. Garfield Weston Scholars in 2012.

== See also ==
- Morehead-Cain Scholarship (oldest merit-based undergraduate scholarship in the United States)
- Canada Millennium Scholarship (Canadian equivalent of US National Merit Scholarship program, awarded to ~2000 students every year, now defunct)
- Schulich Leader Scholarships (Major Canadian scholarship program awarding 100 scholarships annually)
