= The Council of Canadians =

Canadian advocacy group

- Formation: 1985; 41 years ago
- Type: Citizen's organization based in Canada
- Legal status: Active
- Purpose: Advocate and public voice, educator and network
- Headquarters: Ottawa, Ontario, Canada
- Region served: Canada
- Official language: English, French
- Website: canadians.org

The Council of Canadians is a Canadian non-profit organization that advocates for clean water, fair trade, green energy, public health care, and democracy. The organization is headquartered in Ottawa, Ontario with regional offices in Halifax, Toronto, Edmonton and Vancouver and a network of local chapters across the country.

While primarily focused on national issues, the Council of Canadians also does international work through its Blue Planet Project, which focuses on the implementation of the human right to water and sanitation.

== History ==
The Council of Canadians was founded in 1985 in the lead up to the Canada-United States Free Trade Agreement and North American Free Trade Agreement. The Council criticized these and other international free trade agreements on civic nationalist and protectionist grounds, asserting that decision-making power about Canadian economic, cultural, and environmental policy should remain in Canada. The Council later expanded its focus to include campaigns on health care, water, public pensions, corporate influence, and energy.

The Council was created by Mel Hurtig. The founding members included Maude Barlow, Margaret Atwood, David Suzuki, Farley Mowat, Pierre Berton, Margaret Laurence, several politicians and other prominent Canadians.

In 2012, $202,000 was transferred from the Council of Canadians to the Maude Barlow Social Justice Fund Account.

The Council publishes a magazine called Canadian Perspectives, which is published twice a year.

== Support ==
For the 2011-2012 fiscal year, the Council received 92 percent of its funding from members and supporters who gave an average of $54.59. An additional seven percent of the annual budget came from foundation grants.

The Council of Canadians receives no money from governments or corporations. However, it makes no such claims with regards to funding it receives from organizations such as labour unions or environmental activist groups.

== Activity ==
Due to its overt political activities, the Council of Canadians does not qualify as a registered charity in Canada.

In 2011, the Council of Canadians backed a lawsuit brought by a group of voters against the Conservative Party of Canada over the 2011 Canadian federal election voter suppression scandal. Ultimately the voters lost the lawsuit and decided not to appeal the decision to a higher court.

In September 2016, the organization launched a boycott of Nestlé in response to the company outbidding a small town aiming to secure a long-term water supply through a local well, stressing the need for bottled water industry reform as the country battles drought and depletion of ground water reserves.

The Council of Canadians will frequently advocate on behalf of unions, such as the British Columbia Teachers' Federation, involved in labour disputes.

== Civil disobedience ==
On November 20, 2014, Brigette DePape, a Vancouver-based organizer with the Council of Canadians, was arrested with over 14 others by the RCMP at Burnaby Mountain while protesting against Texas-based Kinder Morgan over the company's Trans Mountain pipeline expansion project. The protestors were arrested for "civil contempt” of a court order permitting the company's pipeline survey work. All charges were subsequently dismissed.
