= Derrick Fung =

Canadian entrepreneur

- Born: Derrick Charles Fung; October 19, 1987 (age 38); Toronto, Ontario, Canada
- Education: University of Toronto (BBA)
- Occupation: CEO of Drop Former CEO of Tunezy

Derrick Fung (born October 19, 1987) is an entrepreneur, former foreign exchange trader and contributing writer for Forbes. He is currently the CEO of Drop. He is best known as the founder and CEO of Tunezy, a music company founded in Toronto, Ontario and now based in New York City. Tunezy was acquired in 2013 by SFX Entertainment. In 2014, Derrick was listed on the Forbes Top 30 under 30 list in Music.

== Early life and education ==
Derrick grew up in North York, Ontario, Canada. He attended York Mills Collegiate for high school. He is the son of Cynthia Lai, a Toronto city councillor. During high school, he created a site called QualitySheetMusic.com, which was the largest online sheet music community at the time with over 50,000 registered users. After the site gained notoriety, he sold the website to U.S. investors in 2005.

After graduating from high school in 2005, Derrick attended the Scarborough campus at the University of Toronto where he was enrolled in the Bachelor of Business Administration (BBA) degree. He was a teaching assistant for courses in Macroeconomics and Intermediate Finance. As part of the undergraduate program, he interned at Microsoft in Marketing, BNP Paribas in Equity Derivative Sales and on the trading floor of Merrill Lynch in 2009 as the first class after the merger with Bank of America. Fung was awarded the Gordon Cressy Award in 2010 for his leadership potential.

In January 2010, Fung worked at the Clinton Foundation in New York City as an Intern in the Clinton Global Initiative (CGI). He was one of four Canadians chosen that term to assist with the foundation. He was part of the Membership Department, which was responsible for inviting and managing the delegates for the conference.

Upon graduation from the University of Toronto, he started working at CIBC World Markets on the trading floor where he traded Foreign Exchange. During his time at CIBC, Fung concurrently started building Tunezy part-time with former classmate and co-founder, Brandon Chu, who was in finance at Kraft Foods. On Friday, April 22, 2011, one of his former bosses encouraged him to leave to work on Tunezy full-time and provided him with the initial capital to start the business. Fung officially left CIBC to start Tunezy on December 22, 2011, with Brandon following suit a few months later.

== Tunezy ==
Tunezy was officially incorporated in November 2011 and operations began in January 2012, with Derrick as CEO and Brandon as Head of Product. The first engineer at the company was Fung's brother, Darren Fung. The team started working in Fung's living room in Scarborough, Ontario. The initial concept of the platform was that it would become an online "Social Record Label". Tunezy quickly caught the attention of institutional investors and the company raised a seed round of financing from Intertainment Media (TSXV: INT) in early 2012.

Tunezy came first at the Entrepreneurship pitch in March 2012 against 32 other companies. The company shifted its vision and presented its new direction at the Billboard FutureSound Conference in San Francisco in November 2012, and was placed first in the Billboard Innovators Showcase. In October 2013, it was announced that Tunezy would be acquired by SFX Entertainment for $900,000. The Tunezy platform was rolled into SFX Entertainment after the acquisition. Fung was made a senior member of the Global Business Development team at SFX Entertainment where he focused on the festival Tomorrowland. Fung was the youngest Vice President at the company at age 26. Fung was a co-chair for Canadian Music Week in 2015.

== Drop ==
Fung launched Drop in 2016 after raising $1 million in venture capital from ff Venture Capital, White Star Capital, Rothenberg Ventures, and HIGHLINE. The company has since raised over $25 million to date in a recent financing led by NEA. The app has won numerous awards including being named by Forbes in November 2017 as one of the top tech apps to manage and save money. The app claimed more than 2 million users across North America as of August 2018. He currently serves as the company's CEO.

Fung has been criticized for Drop not honoring its commitment to pay out owed money to members. The app currently owes users thousands of dollars in unredeemable points. On September 13, 2024, a lawsuit was filed against Drop Technologies Inc. in the state of California.

== Awards ==
- Inducted into the 2014 Forbes Top 30 under 30 for Music
- Named a Top 20 under 30 Entrepreneur by Profit
