= Valley of Exile =

2023 Canadian-Lebanese drama film

- Directed by: Anna Fahr
- Written by: Anna Fahr
- Produced by: Anna Fahr; Lara Abou Saifan
- Starring: Maria Hassan; Hala Hosni; Michel Hourani
- Cinematography: Mark Khalife
- Edited by: Anna Fahr; Wajdi Elian
- Music by: Alan Spiljak
- Production companies: Morning Bird Pictures; Placeless Films
- Distributed by: Game Theory Films
- Release date: August 19, 2023 (Cinequest)
- Running time: 106 minutes
- Countries: Canada; Lebanon
- Language: Arabic

Valley of Exile is a Canadian-Lebanese drama film, directed by Anna Fahr and released in 2023. The film centres on Rima (Maria Hassan) and Nour (Hala Hosni), two sisters from Syria who are living in a refugee camp in Lebanon after fleeing their homes during the Syrian civil war.

The cast also includes Michel Hourani, Najwa Kandakji, Joy Hallak, Sajed Amer, Tarek Hakmi, Moe Lattouf and Mohamad Yassine.

The film was shot in late 2021 and early 2022, principally in a real refugee camp in Lebanon's Bekaa Valley.

The film premiered in August 2023 at the Cinequest Film & Creativity Festival, where it won the award for Best Narrative Feature Film, Drama. It was later screened in the Focus: Women, Life and Freedom program at the 2023 Vancouver International Film Festival, where Fahr won the award for Emerging Canadian Director.
