= Asog (film) =

2023 film by Seán Devlin

- Theatrical release poster
- Directed by: Seán Devlin
- Written by: Rey Aclao; Sean Devlin; Arnel Pablo
- Produced by: Seán Devlin
- Starring: Rey Aclao; Arnel Pablo
- Cinematography: Anna MacDonald
- Edited by: Seán Devlin
- Music by: Emmett Hall
- Release dates: June 11, 2023 (Tribeca); August 22, 2025 (Canada)
- Running time: 101 minutes
- Countries: Philippines; Canada
- Language: Tagalog

Asog is a 2023 docufiction film produced and directed by Seán Devlin and written by Rey Aclao, Devlin, and Arnel Pablo. An international co-production between the Philippines and Canada, the film's cast consists entirely of Typhoon Haiyan survivors, none of whom were trained actors. The film is executive produced by Adam McKay, Alan Cumming and Joel Kim Booster.

Time Magazine described the film's impact as "a remarkable victory of society’s poorest over entrenched corporate interests." The film features residents of Sicogon Island who had their land stolen in the aftermath of the storm by the country's largest real estate company Ayala Land Inc. Private armed militia allegedly forced 6,000 people to abandon their ancestral land so the corporations could build a luxury resort. After Asog’s success on the festival circuit, Ayala paid $5.1 million USD in reparations to 784 displaced families who had refused to leave the island. Most of the money was used to build 474 new storm-resistant homes. The Ayala conglomerate allegedly sabotaged the film's Filipino premiere leading Rolling Stone Philippines to dub the film "The Biggest Movie That The Philippines has Never Seen".

The film was a selection of the Cannes Docs-in-progress showcase, had its World Premiere at the Tribeca Film Festival and was an official selection of SXSW Sydney and the 67th BFI London Film Festivals. It also screened in competition at the 39th Warsaw and the 54th Goa International Film Festivals.

== Plot ==
Incorporating both fictionalized and documentary elements, the film stars Filipino transgender comedian Rey "Jaya" Aclao, who is taking former student Arnel Pablo on a road trip to a drag competition; along the way, they meet various people whose lives have been impacted by Haiyan.

== Development ==
Devlin's Mother was born and raised in Leyte, the island that was decimated by Super Typhoon Haiyan. He has been documenting the lives of climate disaster survivors in the Philippines since 2013. He first filmed with Asog co-star Arnel Pablo for a short documentary in 2014. While making the short Devlin attended one of Jaya's live comedy shows. Pablo then starred in Devlin's first hybrid feature When The Storm Fades. Funding was secured for Asog from the Doc Society UK, Frameline Film Festival, and Creative BC.

== Production ==
The film was made with a guerrilla crew of 5 people on a micro budget of US$255,000. There are no trained actors in the film. To make the process simpler for the cast they were all invited to perform in whichever Filipino dialect they felt most comfortable speaking in. Devlin is a Filino-Canadian who was born and raised in Canada but doesn't speak any Filipino dialects. So he directed through a translator and built scenes largely through improvisation.

== Distribution ==
Asog was acquired by Film Movement for limited theatrical and digital distribution in the United States. The film had a limited theatrical release in cinemas across Canada in August 2025. SBS acquired the film for streaming in Australia. It screened at over 40 international festivals in 15 countries across 5 continents.

== Impact & Censorship ==
When production began on the film in 2019 Ayala Land Inc (ALI) had not agreed to address any of the demands of the residents they displaced in Sicogon. After the production secured funding from Doc Society UK in 2021 ALI signed a reparations agreement to meet all the demands from the 784 families who had refused to leave the island. However the corporation consistently delayed the actual delivery of the reparations, only funding the construction of 6 homes by 2022. During the film's post-production an additional 144 homes were built, with another 250 homes built as it toured the festival circuit in 2023. In August 2024, Asog made its Philippine premiere at the Cinemalaya film festival, the same year the festival controversially canceled screenings of the Lost Sabungeros documentary. The film was programmed to screen only once and at a cinema owned by Ayala. Festival attendees reported numerous ways that the company meddled in the screening. People were falsely told the screening was sold out even though a journalist reported that the cinema was only 20% full. The company did not make tickets available for purchase in advance as they did with the festivals other films. They also added a disclaimer to the start of the film which falsely claimed that the residents of Sicogon were "satisfied" with Ayala's conduct on the island. Following the screening the filmmakers posted about the sabotage and demanded that Ayala Land Inc pay 32 million Philippine Pesos that were owed to the community as Iivelihood reparations. The post went viral and led to the corporation paying the amount in full within 24 hours. The film's impact campaign was recognized with the 2026 SIMA Catalyst Award and Humble Lion Jury Prize, with the jury stating: "Recognized, not only for the scale of its outcomes, but for its principled, community-governed approach—demonstrating how impact campaigns can function as instruments of justice, dignity, and lasting change for communities too often excluded from traditional pathways to redress."

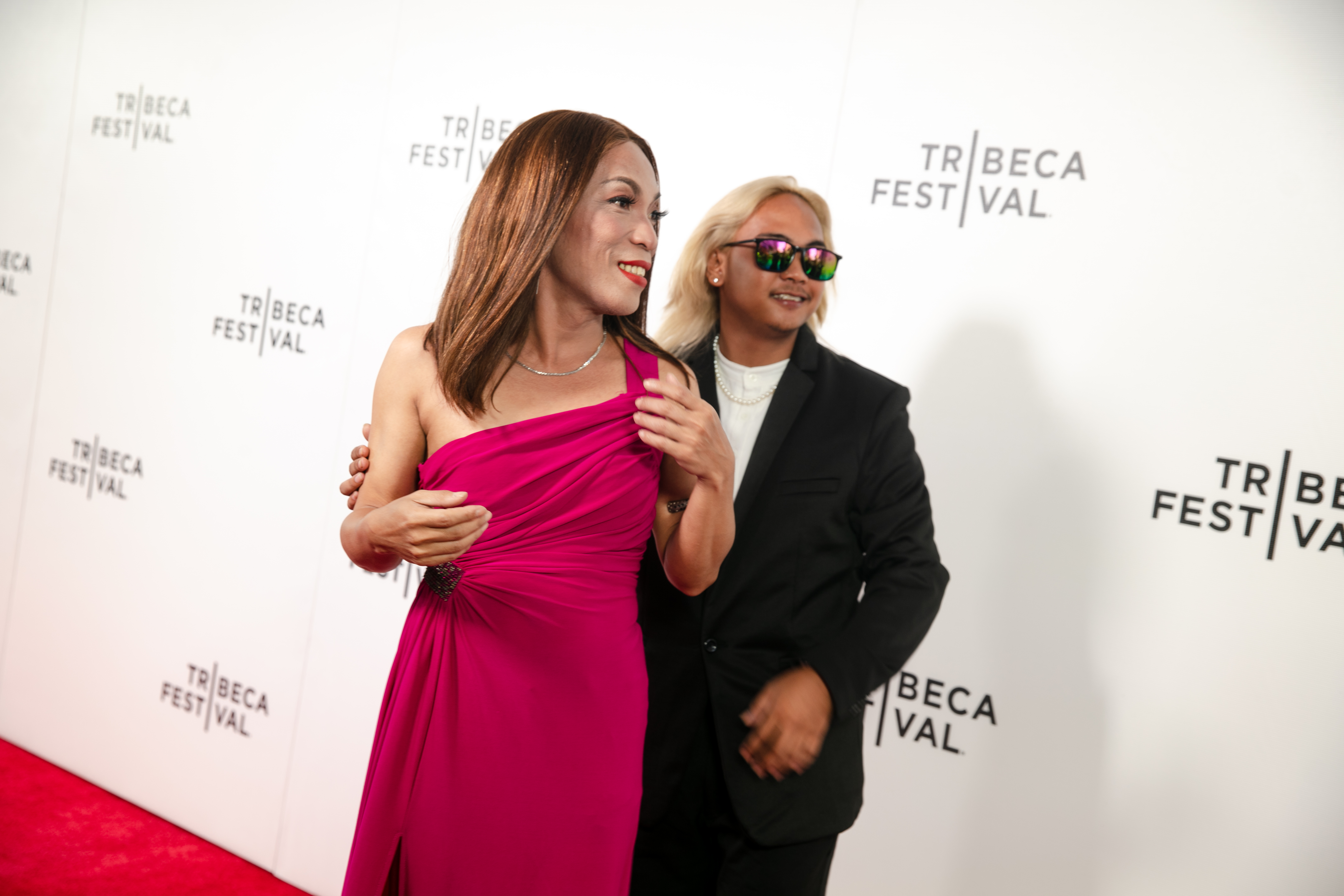
Co-stars Jaya and Arnel Pablo on red carpet at Tribeca Premiere.

== Reception ==
The New York Times critic Devika Girish praised the film's originality saying, "defies all labels, irreverently mixing genres and tones to create something proudly original." The performances, writing and impact were also singled out, "Devlin (who wrote the film with Jaya and Pablo) crafts a fable-like film, with animated interludes, slapstick comedy, flamboyant agitprop and many other flourishes that allow the subjects to tell their stories on their own terms — with humor, rage and imagination." Film Threat wrote that the film is "drop-dead gorgeous" adding "Asog isn’t just a movie; it’s a luminous testament to the human spirit to move on after disaster." Upon its US release in April 2025 Letterboxd included Asog in its Monthly Watchlist of the best new films.

The jury at the Hawai'i International Film Festival awarded the film the Grand Jury Kau Ka Hōkū award stating "this work signals the emergence of an exciting new voice in cinema." The jury included Berlinale Co-director of Programming Jacqueline Lyanga and former Sundance Director of Programming Trevor Groth.

== Accolades ==
Year	Awards	Category	Result	Ref.
2023	Warsaw International Film Festival (Poland)	Free Spirit Prize	Nominated	
2023	Goa International Film Festival (India)	Golden Peacock	Nominated	
2023	Vancouver International Film Festival (Canada)	Audience Award (Spectrum)	Won	
2023	Vancouver International Film Festival (Canada)	Best Canadian Documentary	Special Jury Mention	
2023	Vancouver International Film Festival (Canada)	Best BC Film	Special Jury Mention	
2023	São Paulo International Film Festival (Brazil)	Best Performance (Special Jury Prize)	Won	
2023	São Paulo International Film Festival (Brazil)	New Directors Competition	Nominated	
2023	Hawai'i International Film Festival (USA)	Kau Ka Hōkū (Grand Jury Award)	Won	
2023	Outfest (USA)	Outstanding Screenwriting (International Film)	Won	
2023	Calgary International Film Festival	Canadian Narrative Competition	Special Jury Mention	
2024	Bali International Film Festival (Indonesia)	Committee Choice Prize	Won	
2024	Milan MIX Film Festival (Italy)	Best Feature Film	Won	
2024	Lisbon Queer Film Festival (Portugal)	Best Feature Film	Won	
2024	Roze Filmdagen (Netherlands)	Hivos Prize	Won	
2024	Ljubljana LGBT Film Festival (Slovenia)	Best Feature Film	Won	
2025	Ibiza Cinema Fest (Spain)	Best Feature Film Critics Prize	Won	
2026	SIMA Awards	Catalyst Award & Humble Lion Jury Prize for Impact Campaigning	Won	
