= How to Buy a Baby =

Canadian comedy web series

How to Buy a Baby is a Canadian comedy web series, which premiered in November 2017 on the Canadian Broadcasting Corporation's web platform and on YouTube. Created by Wendy Litner and based on her own experiences having to pursue fertility treatment to conceive a pregnancy, the series stars Meghan Heffern and Marc Bendavid as Jane and Charlie, a couple going through the fertility treatment process.

It was produced by LoCo Motion Pictures, and debuted on the CBC Comedy YouTube channel on November 13, 2017. It was transferred to CBC Gem when that platform launched in 2018. Season one was directed by Molly McGlynn and season two was directed by Adriana Maggs. The series is executive produced by Lauren Corber and Wendy Litner. It has won several accolades, including Best Comedy Series at the 9th annual Indie Series Awards. At the 46th International Emmy Awards, the show was a finalist for Best Short Form Series.

== Episodes ==
=== Season 1 ===
No. overall	No. in season	Title	Directed by	Written by	Original release date
1	1	"Fertiliflinch"	Molly McGlynn	Wendy Litner	November 13, 2017
2	2	"Fertilifamily"	Molly McGlynn	Wendy Litner	November 13, 2017
3	3	"Fertilifucked"	Molly McGlynn	Wendy Litner	November 13, 2017
4	4	"Fertilifight"	Molly McGlynn	Wendy Litner	November 13, 2017
5	5	"Fertilifeelings"	Molly McGlynn	Wendy Litner	November 13, 2017
6	6	"Fertilifunk"	Molly McGlynn	Wendy Litner	November 13, 2017
7	7	"Fertilifentanyl"	Molly McGlynn	Wendy Litner	November 13, 2017
8	8	"Fertilifinances"	Molly McGlynn	Wendy Litner	November 13, 2017
9	9	"Fertilifear"	Molly McGlynn	Wendy Litner	November 13, 2017
10	10	"Fertilifinally"	Molly McGlynn	Wendy Litner	November 13, 2017

=== Season 2 ===
No. overall	No. in season	Title	Directed by	Written by	Original release date
11	1	"Adopt-an-Inspection"	Adriana Maggs	Wendy Litner	August 23, 2019
12	2	"Adopt-a-Class"	Adriana Maggs	Wendy Litner	August 23, 2019
13	3	"Adopt-a-Profile"	Adriana Maggs	Wendy Litner	August 23, 2019
14	4	"Adopt-a-Party"	Adriana Maggs	Wendy Litner	August 23, 2019
15	5	"Adopt-a-Date"	Adriana Maggs	Wendy Litner	August 23, 2019
16	6	"Adopt-a-Feminist"	Adriana Maggs	Wendy Litner	August 23, 2019
17	7	"Adopt-an-Orientation"	Adriana Maggs	Wendy Litner	August 23, 2019
18	8	"Adopt-a-Thon"	Adriana Maggs	Wendy Litner	August 23, 2019
19	9	"Adopt-an-Arguement"	Adriana Maggs	Wendy Litner	August 23, 2019
20	10	"Adopt-a-Future"	Adriana Maggs	Wendy Litner	August 23, 2019

== Reception ==
=== Season 1 ===
At the 9th annual Indie Series Awards, the series won the award for Best Comedy and McGlynn won the award for Best Direction. At the 46th International Emmy Awards, the show was a finalist for Best Short Form Series.

At the 7th Canadian Screen Awards in 2019, the series won the award for Best Original Digital Series, Fiction, and Litner was nominated for Best Writing in a Web Program or Series. How to Buy a Baby Season 2 was nominated for 6 Canadian Screen Awards in 2020. Litner won the award for Best Writing, Web Program or Series and Emma Hunter won Best Supporting Performance, Web Program or Series.

The series won Best Comedy Writing and Best Lead Female Performance at the IAWTV Awards, Best Actress and Best Screenplay at the Rolda Web Fest, and Best Editing at the T.O. Webfest.

The series was nominated for Best Fiction Series at The Rockie Awards and was an Honoree Comedy: Long Form or Series at The Webby Awards.

How to Buy a Baby won the Stand Up 'N Pitch competition at Just for Laughs in 2016.

=== Season 2 ===
The second season was nominated for six awards at the 8th Canadian Screen Awards in 2020; Litner won Best Writing and Emma Hunter won Best Supporting Performance in a Web Program or Series.

It was nominated for six awards at the T.O Webfest and won Best Canadian Series. Rodrigo Fernandez-Stoll won Best Supporting Performance.
