= Aaron Read =

Canadian actor and stand-up comedian

Aaron Read is a Canadian actor and stand-up comedian from Burnaby, British Columbia. He is most noted for his performance in the 2018 film When the Storm Fades, for which he won the Vancouver Film Critics Circle award for Best Supporting Actor in a Canadian Film at the Vancouver Film Critics Circle Awards 2018.

In 2020 he was featured in the CBC Gem stand-up comedy series The New Wave of Standup.

== Filmography ==
=== Film ===
Year	Title	Role	Notes
2018	When the Storm Fades	Trevor	
2021	Four Walls	Anthony	

=== Television ===
Year	Title	Role	Notes
2015	Night Sweats	Art Corner	3 episodes
2015	When in Rome	Crispus	Episode: "Freedom's Prison"
2016, 2017	Girls vs. The City	Mr. Turple	2 episodes
2019	A Million Little Things	Tour Guide	Episode: "The Rosary"
2021	The Slowest Show	Adult Skate Student 2	Episode: "Ice Rink"
