= Where Rabbits Come From =

Short animation film

- Film poster
- French: D'où viennent les lapins
- Directed by: Colin Ludvic Racicot
- Written by: Colin Ludvic Racicot
- Produced by: Bertrand Paquette; Simon Allard
- Starring: Sophie Cadieux; Eric Paulhus
- Music by: Benoit Charest
- Production company: Studio Niloc
- Distributed by: h264 Distribution
- Release date: May 11, 2023 (Sommets du cinéma d'animation)
- Running time: 15 minutes
- Country: Canada
- Language: No dialogue

Where Rabbits Come From (French: D'où viennent les lapins) is a 2023 animation short film, written and directed by Colin Ludvic Racicot. The film stars Sophie Cadieux and Eric Paulhus.

== Production ==
The film's production was first announced in June 2021.

The original score of the film was composed by Benoît Charest, known for his work on Sylvain Chomet's The Triplets of Belleville. Sylvain Chomet worked as a creative advisor on Where Rabbits Come From.

The film's international premiere was at the Zlín Film Festival on July 4, 2023, and had its Canadian premiere at the Sommets de l'animation de Montréal

== Synopsis ==
In a cold, grey, dystopian world, a widowed father rabbit challenges absolute authority by trying to infuse an ounce of wonder, and a little bit of hope, magic, and possibility into his daughter’s life after the mysterious disappearance of her mother. A story of resilience, love and hope in the face of darkness.

== Release ==
The film was also invited at the Vancouver International Film Festival in the Short Forum section and will be screened in October 2023.

== Accolades ==
The film won Best Animation Film Award the Durham Region International Film Festival

The film won the Special Jury Award at the San Diego International Kids' Film Festival

The film also got a special mention at the Imaginaria Film Festival in the Children Competition category.

The film was featured in the TOP 10 short films to watch at the Fantasia International Film Festival on Horreur Québec.

The film won the Canadian Screen Award for Best Animated Short at the 12th Canadian Screen Awards in 2024.
