= Gamodi =

2023 Canadian-Georgian science fiction film

- Directed by: Felix Kalmenson
- Written by: Ana Gzirishvili; Felix Kalmenson
- Produced by: Felix Kalmenson; Ketevan Kipiani; Alexandre Jordania
- Starring: Matt Shally; Maqsime Rauch; Luka Chachxiani
- Cinematography: Zarina Kodzati
- Edited by: Sasha Putsyato
- Music by: Manana Menabde
- Production company: Kursha Films
- Release date: October 3, 2023 (VIFF)
- Running time: 98 minutes
- Countries: Canada; Georgia
- Languages: English; Georgian

Gamodi is a Canadian-Georgian science fiction film, directed by Felix Kalmenson and released in 2023. Set during the COVID-19 pandemic, the film stars Matt Shally and Maqzime Rauch as Viktor and Tarzan, a drag queen and a teenage drifter in Tbilisi who, with nowhere to self-isolate during COVID lockdowns, squat together in an abandoned tower block which increasingly resembles a purgatory between life and death.

The film premiered in the Panorama program at the 2023 Vancouver International Film Festival, where it received an honorable mention from the Best Canadian Film award jury. It was also subsequently screened in the National Competition lineup at the 2023 Festival du nouveau cinéma.
