= Canopy Labs =

Software company in Canada

- Industry: Computer software
- Founded: 2012
- Founder: Wojciech Gryc; Jorge Escobedo
- Successor: Drop
- Headquarters: Toronto, Ontario, Canada
- Website: www.canopylabs.com

Canopy Labs is a customer analytics company headquartered in Toronto, Ontario, Canada, with offices in San Francisco. It was founded in 2012 and offers SaaS marketing analytics for businesses and organizations. The company is an alumnus of the Y Combinator accelerator program. Canopy Labs was acquired by Drop.

== History ==
Canopy Labs was founded in 2012 in Thornhill, Ontario by Wojciech Gryc and Jorge Escobedo. Gryc is a Loran Scholar, Rhodes Scholar and former McKinsey consultant, and Escobedo is a former PhD researcher at the Perimeter Institute and University of Waterloo.

In 2012, the company joined the Y Combinator start-up acceleration program in Silicon Valley as part of the 2012 Summer Class. The company returned to Toronto in 2012, raising $1.5 million in seed funding from BDC Venture Capital's IT Fund, Peter Thiel's Valar Ventures, and a number of angel investors.

In March 2015, the company announced the launch of its new Canopy Labs platform, focused on helping businesses to track and optimize customer journeys and purchase funnels.

In 2018, Canopy Labs was acquired by customer loyalty company Drop Technologies.
