= Fitting In =

2023 film by Molly McGlynn

- Theatrical release poster
- Directed by: Molly McGlynn
- Written by: Molly McGlynn
- Produced by: Jennifer Weiss
- Starring: Maddie Ziegler; D'Pharaoh Woon-A-Tai; Djouliet Amara; Emily Hampshire
- Cinematography: Nina Djacic
- Edited by: Maureen Grant
- Music by: Casey Manierka-Quaile
- Production companies: Wonndaland Pictures; Nice Picture
- Distributed by: Elevation Pictures
- Release dates: March 13, 2023 (SXSW); February 2, 2024 (North America)
- Running time: 106 minutes
- Country: Canada
- Language: English
- Box office: $87,320

Fitting In is a 2023 Canadian coming-of-age comedy drama film written and directed by Molly McGlynn. It stars Maddie Ziegler, D'Pharaoh Woon-A-Tai, Djouliet Amara, and Emily Hampshire. The story centers around 16-year-old Lindy, who is diagnosed with a rare reproductive condition, MRKH syndrome. The diagnosis disrupts her understanding of her sexual identity, and throws her relationships with her new boyfriend, her friends at her new high school, and her mother into disarray.

The film was titled Bloody Hell in its first showing at SXSW. Several additional film festival showings were presented in 2023. The film won the award for Best Canadian Film at the 2023 Vancouver International Film Festival, and Ziegler won the award for Outstanding Performance by an Actor at the Northern Ontario Music and Film Awards. It was released in theatres in February 2024.

== Synopsis ==
16-year-old Lindy has never had a period. She is diagnosed with a rare reproductive condition, MRKH syndrome. The diagnosis throws into disarray her relationships with her new boyfriend, Adam; her single mother; her best friend, Vivian; and others at her new high school. Her insensitive doctors advise her that she will have to use uncomfortable vaginal dilators frequently for the next "3 to 18 months" or have vaginal surgery. She feels unable to tell Adam about her condition and avoids him. Adam, confused about Lindy's moody behavior, breaks up with her. Lindy later believes that he and Vivian are romantically involved. She quits the track team. Meanwhile, her mother tries hard to reconnect with her.

Lindy starts a rebound relationship with Chad, a boy working at a fast-food restaurant, and has intercourse with him partly just to avoid having to use her vaginal dilator. She meets an intersex person at her school, Jax, to whom she confides about her MRKH syndrome. They also have a sexual encounter, but when Jax accompanies Lindy to a party and Chad approaches Lindy, Lindy doesn't want him to know that she is together with Jax; Jax is angry and leaves. Lindy then gets drunk at the party and is mortified to find out, the next morning, that the whole school now knows that she has a genital condition.

At a track meet after school, Vivian wins a race. She tells Lindy that she is not seeing Adam; the two make up. Some boys comment on Lindy's condition, and she publicly confronts them, standing up for herself. She texts Jax to apologize and cathartically admits to Vivian that she is sad and angry that she cannot have children. Lindy soon meets a female doctor who is more sympathetic than the male doctors have been; she tells Lindy that there is no rush to treat her condition either surgically or otherwise. Lindy begins to feel more positive about herself and reconnects with Jax.

== Cast ==
- Maddie Ziegler as Lindy
- Emily Hampshire as Rita, Lindy's mother
- Djouliet Amara as Vivian
- Ki Griffin as Jax
- D'Pharaoh Woon-A-Tai as Adam
- Dale Whibley as Chad
- Michael Therriault as Dr. Doheny
- Dennis Andres as Coach Mike

== Production ==
The film is semi-autobiographical, as its creator, Molly McGlynn, was diagnosed with MRKH syndrome as a teenager. In June 2022, the casting of Ziegler and Hampshire was announced. Principal photography took place in Sudbury, Ontario, from May 30 to June 27, 2022.

== Release ==
The film premiered on March 13, 2023, under the title Bloody Hell, in the narrative spotlight section of the 2023 South by Southwest Film & TV Festival in Austin, Texas.

Retitled Fitting In, the film was shown at the 2023 Toronto International Film Festival and the 2023 Cinéfest Sudbury International Film Festival in Ontario, Canada, in September 2023, and at the 2023 Vancouver International Film Festival and the 2023 Calgary International Film Festival, both beginning that month.

Blue Fox Entertainment distributed the film in the US, with the theatrical release on February 2, 2024. Elevation Pictures distributed the film in Canada, with a release in theatres there also on February 2, 2024.

The film was released on digital platforms through The Movie Partnership on September 9, 2024.

== Reception ==
On the review aggregator website Rotten Tomatoes, 96% of 45 critics' reviews are positive, with an average rating of 7.3/10. The website's consensus reads: "Led by a Maddie Ziegler performance that's as funny as it is fearless, Fitting In takes a boldly provocative look at the assumptions and expectations surrounding modern femininity."

After its premiere at SXSW, Marco Vito Oddo, writing for Collider, Sage Dunlap in The Daily Texan, Laura Bradley in The Daily Beast, Dennis Harvey in Variety and Stephen Saito in The Moveable Fest praised Ziegler's performance and the message of the film. In September 2023, Marya E. Gates in RogerEbert.com did the same.

Fitting In was a nominee for Best Direction in a Feature Film at the 2023 Directors Guild of Canada awards and won the award for Best Canadian Film at the 2023 Vancouver International Film Festival. Ziegler won the award for Outstanding Performance by an Actor at the Northern Ontario Music and Film Awards.

=== Awards ===
Association	Date of ceremony	Category	Recipient(s)	Result	Ref(s)
Canadian Screen Awards	2024	Best Art Direction/Production Design	Thea Hollatz	Nominated	
Canadian Screen Awards	2024	Best Casting in a Film	Jason Knight, John Buchan	Nominated	
Vancouver International Film Festival	2023	Best Canadian Film	Molly McGlynn	Won	
Northern Ontario Music and Film Awards	2024	Outstanding Feature Film	Fitting In	Nominated	
Northern Ontario Music and Film Awards	2024	Outstanding Performance by an Actor	Maddie Ziegler	Won	
