= Mary Goes Round =

2017 film

- Film poster
- Directed by: Molly McGlynn
- Written by: Molly McGlynn
- Produced by: Matt Code
- Starring: Aya Cash; Sara Waisglass; John Ralston; Melanie Nicholls-King
- Cinematography: Nick Haight
- Edited by: Christine Armstrong; Bryan Atkinson
- Music by: Dillon Baldassero; Casey Manierka-Quaile
- Production companies: Wildling Pictures; Hawkeye Pictures
- Release dates: 7 September 2017 (TIFF); 30 March 2018 (Canada)
- Running time: 86 minutes
- Country: Canada
- Language: English

Mary Goes Round is a 2017 Canadian drama film directed by Molly McGlynn. It was screened in the Discovery section at the 2017 Toronto International Film Festival.

The film centres on Mary, a substance abuse counsellor who is forced to take a sabbatical from her job after getting arrested for drunk driving. Returning to her hometown to visit her estranged father, she struggles to cope with the revelations that her father is terminally ill and that her teenage half-sister was never told she exists.

== Plot ==
Mary is an addiction counsellor in Toronto who is herself secretly struggling with an addiction to alcohol. After getting arrested while drinking and driving Mary is forced into a sabbatical at work and her boyfriend leaves her.

Unwilling to admit she has a problem, Mary decides to return to her hometown of Niagara as her estranged father has been pressuring her to connect with Robyn, her teenage paternal half-sister who Mary has never met. Immediately upon arriving however Mary learns that her younger sister Robyn doesn't know who she is and that her father lied to her as he is dying of lung cancer and wants Mary there to help take care of Robyn.

Mary reluctantly begins to attend Alcoholics Anonymous meetings where she meets Lou, a former drug addict and home care worker who helps Mary to find work and advises her on how to deal with her father. As Mary and Lou become friends, Mary attempts to pass Lou off as an ex-classmate, however Mary's father Walt is himself a recovering alcoholic and recognizes Lou from meetings.

When Mary's father begins coughing up blood and has to go to the hospital Robyn finally learns the truth and lashes out at Mary, blaming her for their father's lies and refusing to go to school.

Robyn disappears one night and Mary receives an anonymous call telling her where to find her. Mary finds her but on their way home they are pulled over by a police officer and Mary is fined for driving on a suspended license. At the police station in an attempt to comfort Robyn, Mary admits that she is an alcoholic for the first time.

While cleaning up their home Mary discovers old letters in which she discovers she is not her father's biological daughter. She had also previously held a grudge against her father for having an affair and not contacting her after her mother relocated her to Timmins causing their estrangement, however she finds birthday cards indicating he did attempt to contact her for years after she left. Mary talks the situation over with Lou who encourages her not to confront Walt. Walt attends an AA meeting with Mary where he talks about the importance of staying clean and stressing that it is never too late to want to make a change.

Realizing that Walt will not survive to see Robyn graduate high school Mary decides to organize an early graduation party for Robyn and Walt. Walt dies shortly after and Mary attends an AA meeting where she is given a 24 hour sober chip signifying her desire to live a sober life.

== Cast ==
- Aya Cash as Mary
- Sara Waisglass as Robyn
- John Ralston as Walt
- Melanie Nicholls-King as Lou
- Aaron Poole as Pete
- Kristian Bruun as Officer Wayne
- Jess Salgueiro as Crystal
- Emma Hunter as Erin
- Yanna McIntosh as Bethany
- Jesse LaVercombe as Lawyer Doug

== Reception ==
On the review aggregator website Rotten Tomatoes, the film has an approval rating of 90% based on 10 reviews, with an average rating of 6.8/10.

In January 2019, McGlynn won the Jay Scott Prize for emerging filmmakers from the Toronto Film Critics Association.
