= Vancouver International Film Festival Award for Best Canadian Film =

The Vancouver International Film Festival Award for Best Canadian Film is an annual award, presented by the Vancouver International Film Festival to honour the film selected by a jury as the best Canadian film screened at VIFF that year.

The award was presented for the first time in 2003. It was initially open only to films from Western Canada, but was expanded in 2009 to include all Canadian films.

== Winners ==
Year	Film	Director	Ref.
2003	On the Corner	Nathaniel Geary	
2004	Seven Times Lucky	Gary Yates	
2005	Lucid	Sean Garrity	
2006	Everything's Gone Green	Paul Fox	
2007	Normal	Carl Bessai	
2008	Fifty Dead Men Walking	Kari Skogland	
2009	I Killed My Mother (J'ai tué ma mère)	Xavier Dolan	
2010	Incendies	Denis Villeneuve	
2010	Curling	Denis Côté	
2011	Nuit #1	Anne Émond	
2011	Wetlands (Marécages)	Guy Édoin	
2012	Blackbird	Jason Buxton	
2012	Becoming Redwood	Jesse James Miller	
2013	Rhymes for Young Ghouls	Jeff Barnaby	
2013	That Burning Feeling	Jason James	
2014	Violent	Andrew Huculiak	
2015	Sleeping Giant	Andrew Cividino	
2016	Window Horses	Ann Marie Fleming	
2017	Black Cop	Cory Bowles	
2018	Edge of the Knife (SG̲aawaay Ḵ'uuna)	Gwaai Edenshaw, Helen Haig-Brown	
2018	Genesis (Genèse)	Philippe Lesage	
2018	The Grizzlies	Miranda de Pencier	
2019	One Day in the Life of Noah Piugattuk	Zacharias Kunuk	
2019	Blood Quantum	Jeff Barnaby	
2020	Beans	Tracey Deer	
2021	Without Havana (Sin la Habana)	Kaveh Nabatian	
2022	Riceboy Sleeps	Anthony Shim	
2022	Queens of the Qing Dynasty	Ashley McKenzie	
2023	Fitting In	Molly McGlynn	
2023	Gamodi	Felix Kalmenson	
2024	Universal Language	Matthew Rankin	
2025	The Things You Kill	Alireza Khatami	
2026	Nina Roza	Geneviève Dulude-De Celles	
2026	Strong Son	Ian Bawa	

== See also ==
- Toronto International Film Festival Award for Best Canadian Film
