= Corey Payette =

Corey Payette (born January 5, 1987) is a Canadian theatre and film writer, songwriter, and director based in Vancouver, British Columbia.

== Background ==
A member of the Mattagami First Nation, Payette is of mixed Oji-Cree, Franco-Ontarian and Irish descent. He grew up in New Liskeard, Ontario.

After studying music composition at York University, he moved to Vancouver.

Payette is the current artistic director of Urban Ink Productions. He is also founding artistic director of the Raven Theatre in Vancouver.

== Career ==
=== Theatre ===
His first musical, Children of God, was an examination of the Canadian Indian residential school system. It premiered at Vancouver's York Theatre in May 2017, followed by a two-week run at the National Arts Centre in Ottawa. The production embarked on a national tour through 2019. Of the original production's designation as a Canada 150 event, Payette said that he viewed the Canada 150 program as an opportunity to educate Canadians about aspects of their history that had been underrepresented.

His second musical, Les Filles du Roi, premiered in 2018. It presented a feminist and indigenous spin on Canadian colonial history, telling the story of a French fille du roy who comes to New France in the 17th century, but finds her purpose in her connection with new Mohawk friends rather than in the traditional role of the filles du roy. The production won several Jessie Richardson Theatre Awards in 2019, including awards for Payette for Outstanding Direction and Outstanding Sound Design in Small Theatre.

Later in 2018, he also premiered Sedna, based on an Inuit legend. The outdoor theatre production blended music with puppetry. It was performed by the Caravan Farm Theatre company in Armstrong.

In 2023, he premiered Starwalker, a musical about an indigenous two-spirit character, a drag queen living in Vancouver. It marked his first time creating a musical around a contemporary story rather than one drawn from indigenous history.

=== Film ===
In the 2010s, he composed music for an OMNI Television documentary about artist Amin Amir.

Stories That Transform Us, his documentary film about the history of the Urban Ink Productions, premiered at the 2021 Vancouver International Film Festival.

In 2022, he entered production on Les Filles du Roi, a film adaptation of the 2018 musical. It premiered at the 2023 Vancouver International Film Festival.

Starwalker, a film adaptation of the 2023 musical, premiered at the 2025 Inside Out Film and Video Festival.

== Personal life ==
He is out as LGBT.
