= Shit Harper Did =

Canadian political comedy website and media project

Shit Harper Did (SHD) (2011–2015) was a Canadian tactical media project that used humor, satire, digital media, pranks and political interventions to critique the Conservative government led by Prime Minister Stephen Harper. The website ShitHarperDid.com went viral following its launch in April 2011, receiving over a million hits within hours. In its first three days, the website attracted over 4.1 million visitors, and one of its videos became the most-shared content on YouTube in Canada at the time. Canadian celebrities Margaret Atwood and Elliot Page were early online supporters of the campaign. The project was created by several artists including Cam Reed and comedian and filmmaker Sean Devlin.

== Reception ==
The project was popular with young demographics who did not typically engage in politics. The Globe and Mail described the project as a "stealth campaign that's been spreading like prairie wildfire." The Huffington Post called it "the viral phenomenon that captured the digital zeitgeist."

== Interventions with prime minister and other elected officials ==
=== Infiltrations of prime minister's security detail ===
In 2014, ShitHarperDid co-creator Sean Devlin and activist Shireen Soofi disguised themselves as waiters and infiltrated Prime Minister Stephen Harper's security detail at a private event. According to media they came within "stabbing distance" of the prime minister before displaying signs protesting the government's inaction on climate change.

The action sparked national debate on climate change policy. Devlin and SHD organizer Brigette Depape appeared on CBC News Network's Power and Politics to discuss the action.

Following the interview, the program hosted a panel featuring elected officials from the NDP, the Liberal Party, and the Conservative government to debate the cost of climate change. During the discussion, Conservative MP Peter Braid acknowledged a link between extreme weather events and climate change. CBC reported this as the first instance of a federal Conservative MP acknowledging this scientific link.

CBC host Even Solomon asked Braid to confirm he was saying that extreme weather and climate change are related, Braid answered, "Absolutely, I'm confirming I said that." The NDP and Liberal MPs were both surprised by the statement.

In 2015, Devlin once again bypassed the prime minister's security at a Conservative campaign event. This time, he disguised himself in a blazer and was invited on stage to stand behind Harper. Beneath his jacket, he wore a shirt featuring a message critical of the Conservative government's immigration policies. Security intervened after noticing the shirt, and Devlin was arrested for resisting arrest and obstruction of justice.

ShitHarperDid began organizing direct action training sessions on university campuses across Canada. These sessions aimed to educate activists on nonviolent protest tactics, media engagement, and strategic civil disobedience. The organization frequently coordinated and participated face to face interventions with Conservative politicians.

=== Prime minster's wife interrupted at cat video festival ===
In April 2014, Laureen Harper, wife of Prime Minister Stephen Harper, was interrupted while giving a speech at a cat video festival. 21-year-old SHD activist Hailey King asked her, "Mrs. Harper, raising awareness about cat welfare is a good look for your husband's upcoming campaign strategy... Don't you think supporting an inquiry into missing and murdered indigenous women in this country would be a better look for your husband's upcoming campaign strategy?" CBC reported that Mrs. Harper replied, "That's (missing women) a great cause, but that's another night. Tonight we're here for homeless cats."

=== Oil spill delivery ===
After an oil spill in Vancouver waters, ShitHarperDid artists interrupted a press conference by Conservative Federal Minister of Industry James Moore and MP Andrew Saxton. Wearing hazmat suits, they brought oil-soaked debris from the spill site and asked the politicians to touch it. They both refused. These actions highlighted the fact that the Conservatives had shut down the Vancouver Coast Guard Station prior to the spill.

=== Election fraud "promise rings" ===
SHD supporters visited Conservative candidates at their constituency offices and asked them to promise not to cheat in the coming election. These requests were made by youth activists who knelt and offered the politicians a "promise ring". One Conservative candidate agreed to sign the pledge, in the process admitting that the party had been found guilty of breaking election laws in the past three federal elections.

== Digital pranks ==
Economic Action Plan

In the lead-up to the 2015 federal election, the Conservative Party spent tens of millions in public dollars promoting their "Economic Action Plan." In response, ShitHarperDid purchased the domain EconomicActionPlan.ca for $9—an oversight by the government—and used the site to parody and expose the failures of Conservative economic policies. The satirical website quickly outpaced the government's official site in terms of traffic. The group then crowdfunded donations from supporters to successfully air a series of satirical ads on national television, including during the Stanley Cup playoffs.

Conservative Legacy Fund

The group later created a parody campaign for a "Conservative Legacy Fund" which aimed to raise donations for Conservative politicians in prison for breaking federal election laws.

== Impact ==
The project garnered attention for its ability to damage the public image of the Conservatives, with Postmedia noting that it was "wreaking havoc on the Conservative Party's closely orchestrated election output."

The campaign was created to by young artists to engage their peers, using sociological insights and a strategy built around humor. The multiyear campaign was part of a broader progressive movement that engaged young Canadians in the political process. By the time the project ended in 2015 there had been an unprecedented increase in youth voting. Turnout among this group increased 18.3 points, to 57.1 per cent compared to 38.8 per cent in 2011. This wave of newly engaged youth voters is credited with ushering the Conservative Party out of power after nine years in power.

== Controversy ==
The group's ability to infiltrate the prime minister's security caused national debate on security protocols for public officials. Conservative Senator Bob Runciman condemned the act and called for harsher penalties for such breaches, suggesting that Devlin and Soofi should face indictable offenses with significant fines or imprisonment. However, no formal charges were laid.

Elections Canada briefly investigated Devlin and the group regarding the site's compliance with Canada's third party election advertising laws. The laws require any entity that spends over $500 on election advertising to register with Elections Canada, but ShitHarperDid.com was initially created for under $250, relying on the volunteer efforts of those involved. Elections Canada made no formal charges and no violations were found.

The report of the Chief Electoral Officer of Canada on the 41st General Election cited the impact of "humorous videos" and proposed that Parliament update federal election law, stating "The use of new technologies can improve the federal electoral process by enhancing both equality and freedom of expression. To reduce the current uncertainty and take advantage of new technologies, Parliament may wish to consider excluding from the definition of election advertising all Internet-based communications by third parties."
