= When the Storm Fades =

- Directed by: Seán Devlin
- Written by: Sean Devlin
- Produced by: Seán Devlin; Chris Ferguson
- Starring: Abner Pablo; Arnel Pablo; Lovely Pablo; Nilda Pablo
- Cinematography: Jeff Petry
- Edited by: Seán Devlin; Marianna Khoury
- Music by: Susie Ibarra
- Release date: October 4, 2018 (VIFF)
- Running time: 80 minutes
- Country: Canada
- Language: English

When the Storm Fades is a Canadian docufiction film, directed by Seán Devlin and released in 2018. Described by Devlin as a "docudramedy" because it blends aspects of both docudrama and comedy-drama, the film is set in the Philippines in the aftermath of Typhoon Haiyan and depicts a family's attempts to recover from the disaster.

The film stars the real-life Pablo family from Leyte, and is improvised in part around their own real-life experience of the typhoon. Although the film's primary themes address climate change and the effort to recover from grief and loss, the film includes a secondary storyline which depicts two Canadian aid workers (Aaron Read and Kayla Lorette) whose attempts to play the "white savior" backfire.

The film premiered at the 2018 Vancouver International Film Festival, where Devlin won the Emerging Canadian Director award.

Read won the award for Best Supporting Actor in a Canadian Film, and Lorette won the award for Best Supporting Actress in a Canadian Film, at the Vancouver Film Critics Circle Awards 2018. The film was also a nominee for Best British Columbia Film.
