= The Beaverton (TV series) =

Television series

- Starring: Miguel Rivas; Emma Hunter; Marilla Wex; Laura Cilevitz; Aisha Alfa; Donavon Stinson
- Country of origin: Canada

Production
- Production company: Pier 21 Films

Original release
- Network: The Comedy Network (2016-18); CTV (2019)
- Release: November 9, 2016 – September 10, 2019

The Beaverton is a Canadian news satire television comedy series, which premiered on The Comedy Network in 2016. Based on the satirical online publication of the same name, the series follows the format of a mock television newscast, parodying both the content and the form of contemporary television news.

The show stars Miguel Rivas and Emma Hunter as the anchors, with Laura Cilevitz, Aisha Alfa, Marilla Wex, Dave Barclay and Donavon Stinson as correspondents, and Pat Smith and Luke Gordon Field as hosts of the Beaverton Sports Network segment. Numerous Canadian actors, comedians and other media personalities have also appeared on the show in supporting character roles as interview guests. Field is also one of the show's producers, and the editor of the parent website.

Writers for the series included Field, Jeff Detsky, Alexander Saxton, Jacob Duarte Spiel, Kurt Smeaton, Pat Dussault, Nile Séguin, Wendy Litner and Winter Tekenos Levy.

Pier 21 Productions announced in July 2015 that a pilot was in development. In June 2016, the Comedy Network confirmed that it had picked up the series for airing in the 2016-17 television season. In June 2017 Beaverton was greenlit for season 2 in press release by Bell Media Studios.

The series debuted on November 9, 2016. Because the first episode was taped before, but aired after, the date of the 2016 United States presidential election, the program prepared and filmed two different introductions based on both possible outcomes.

In the third season, originals began debuting on CTV.

== Cast ==
- Emma Hunter as Self-host
- Miguel Rivas as Self-host
- Laura Cilevitz as Self-correspondent
- Pat Smith as Pat Smith - Beaverton Sports Network
- Donavon Stinson as Self-correspondent
- Aisha Alfa as Self-correspondent

== Critical response ==
National Post critic David Berry wrote favourably about the show's premiere, noting that the show displayed signs of a much harder satirical bite than the relatively soft parodic tradition of established shows such as This Hour Has 22 Minutes. Heather Mallick of the Toronto Star wrote that she was looking forward to the series premiere, comparing the advance preview clips she had seen to the best of The Onion and the Canadian sketch comedy classic SCTV.

The series was a Canadian Screen Award nominee for Variety or Sketch Comedy Program or Series at the 5th Canadian Screen Awards and the 6th Canadian Screen Awards.

== Series overview ==
Season	Episodes	Originally released	
Season	Episodes	First released	Last released
1	13	November 9, 2016	February 8, 2017
2	13	November 1, 2017	February 7, 2018
3	8	July 23, 2019	September 10, 2019
