= Wendy Litner =

Canadian television writer and producer

Wendy Litner is a Canadian television writer and producer, most noted as creator of the web series How to Buy a Baby and My Dead Mom.

Both series were based in part on Litner's own life, with How to Buy a Baby centred on her experience pursuing fertility treatment after struggling to get pregnant, and My Dead Mom focusing on her experience navigating grief after the death of her mother.

She has been a two-time Canadian Screen Award winner for Best Writing in a Web Series, at the 8th Canadian Screen Awards in 2020 for How to Buy a Baby and at the 13th Canadian Screen Awards in 2025 for My Dead Mom.

She has also written for the television series The Beaverton, Pretty Hard Cases, Children Ruin Everything, Popularity Papers and Run the Burbs, and the web series The D Cut.
