= Jennifer Lines =

Canadian theatre and television actress

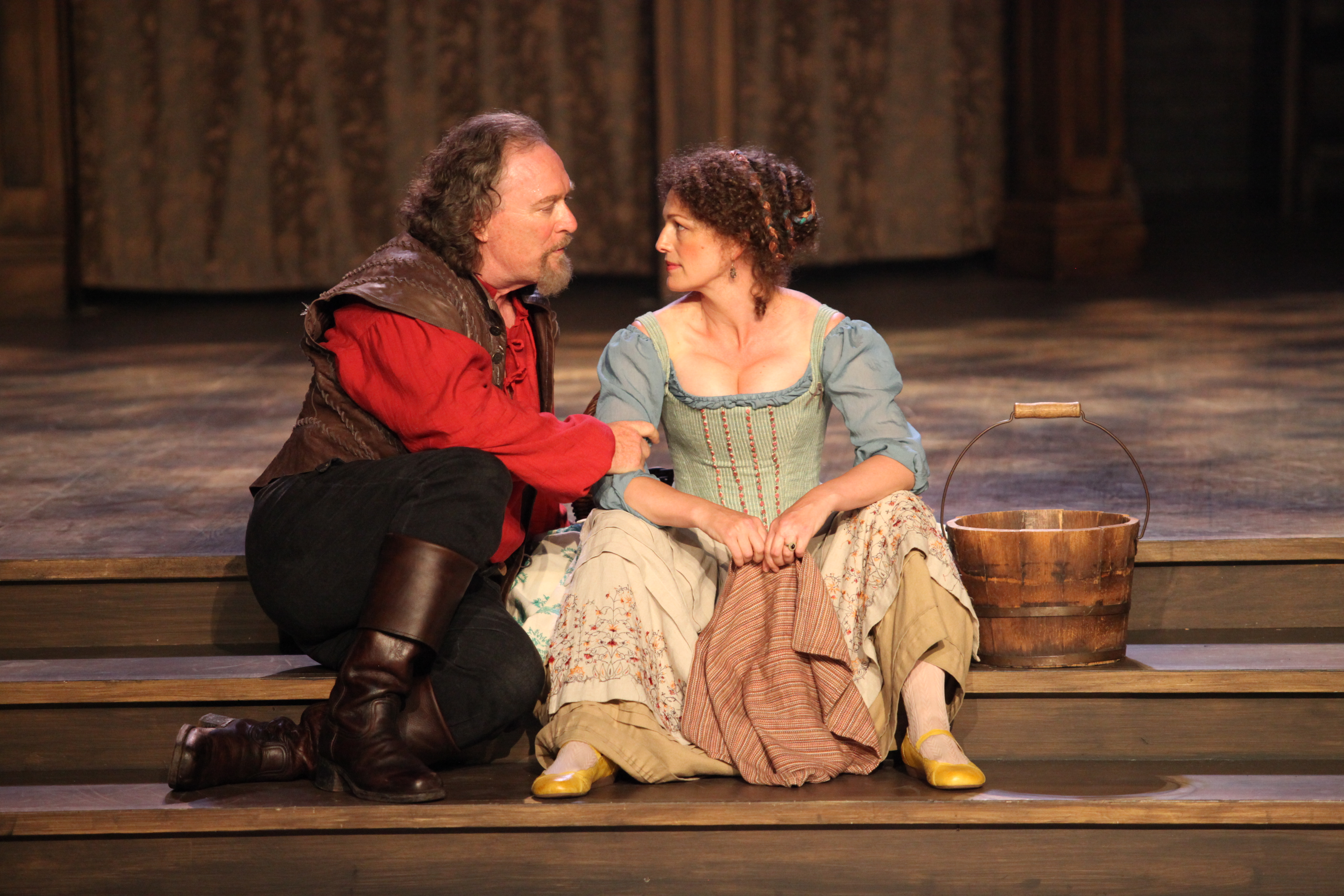
Lines (right) performing in a stage-play with Benedict Campbell at 2015

Jennifer Lines is a Canadian theatre and television actress.

Lines graduated with a Bachelor of Fine Arts in Theatre from the University of Victoria. She has starred in productions at the Arts Club Theatre, Bard on the Beach, Vancouver Playhouse and the Belfry Theatre. She has played in Beyond Eden, The Amorous Adventures of Anatol, A Little Night Music and Hello Dolly at the Vancouver Playhouse. Her stage credits for the Art Club include It's a Wonderful Life, The Real Thing, Here on the Flight Path and Sylvia.

Lines has received several Jessie Richardson Theatre Award nominations. She was nominated for a Jessie Richardson Award in 2014 for the category of Outstanding Performance by an Actress in a Supporting Role for Small Theatre for her performance in Whose Life Is It Anyway? staged by Realwheels Theatre. Lines has been fascinated by Shakespeare's plays from an early age.

Lines was praised by the Globe and Mail for her gender-bending portrayal of Horatio in the Bard on the Beach's 2013 staging of Hamlet. The Georgia Straight has praised Lines for both her technical skill and for being "emotionally present" as an actress. The Province calls Lines' performance "classic." Vancouver Sun calls Lines one of "Vancouver's brightest stars of the theatre."

== Selected stage credits ==
- Simone in Après Moi, staged by Ruby Slippers Theatre in association with BoucheWHACKED! Theatre Collective (2015).
- Horatio in Hamlet, staged by Bard on the Beach (2013).
- Olivia in Twelfth Night, staged by Bard on the Beach (2013).
- Mary Bailey in It's a Wonderful Life, staged by Arts Club Theatre (2012).
- Mimi in Mimi or a Poisoner's Comedy, staged by Touchstone Theatre (2010).
- Beatrice in Much Ado About Nothing, staged by Bard on the Beach (2010).
- Cleopatra in Antony and Cleopatra, staged by Bard on the Beach (2010).
- Luciana in A Comedy of Errors, staged by Bard on the Beach (2009).
- Ariel in The Tempest, staged by Bard on the Beach (2008).
- Annie in The Real Thing, staged by StoppardFest (2007).
- Cressida in Troilus and Cressida, staged by Bard on the Beach (2006).
- Rosaline in Love's Labour's Lost, staged by Bard on the Beach (2005).
- Mistress Ford in Merry Wives of Windsor, staged by Bard on the Beach (2004).
- Margaret in Much Ado About Nothing, staged by Bard on the Beach (2004).
- Adriana in A Comedy of Errors, staged by Bard on the Beach (2003).
- Nerissa in The Merchant of Venice, staged by Bard on the Beach (2003).
- Katherine in Henry V, staged by Bard on the Beach (2002).
- Maria in Twelfth Night, staged by Bard on the Beach (2002).
- Julia in The Two Gentlemen of Verona, staged by Bard on the Beach.
- Maria in Love's Labour's Lost, staged by Bard on the Beach (1997).
- Mopsa in The Winter's Tale, staged by Bard on the Beach (1997).
- Margaret in Much Ado About Nothing, staged by Bard on the Beach (1996).
- Jessica in The Merchant of Venice, staged by Bard on the Beach (1996).
