= Brigette DePape =

Canadian activist

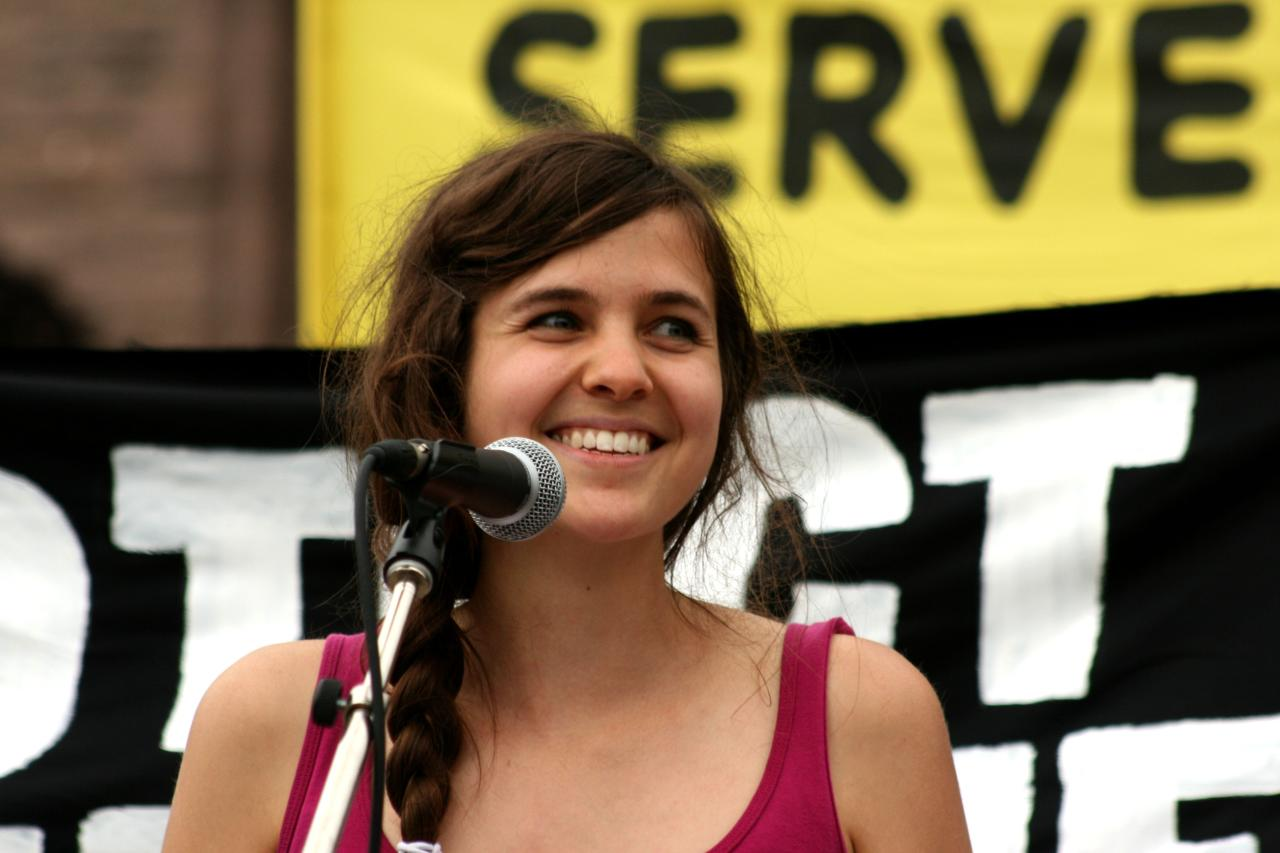
- Other name: Brigette Marcelle
- Occupation: Activist
- Known for: Protesting in the Canadian Senate

Brigette DePape (born 1989) is a Canadian activist from Winnipeg, Manitoba, who was a Canadian Senate page when she disrupted the throne speech in 2011 with a silent demonstration in the Senate of Canada. She has protested other events as well, causing her to be arrested in 2014.

== Early life ==
DePape attended Collège Jeanne-Sauvé in Winnipeg, Manitoba. She was a recipient of the Loran Award in 2007 in part for her association with Students without Borders: Afrique 2007 and fundraising efforts for Senegal.

== Stop Harper! ==
While a participant in the Canadian Senate Page Program in 2011, DePape stood in protest during the Throne Speech in the Senate, silently holding up a sign that said "Stop Harper!" This action led to her prompt dismissal, for breaching the non-partisan nature of the page position and disrupting the Governor General in Parliament. In a subsequent interview, DePape explained that she disagreed with Prime Minister Stephen Harper's policies.

In an interview, then Opposition Leader Jack Layton voiced disapproval of DePape's protest, stating "We have been pushing for decorum in the House of Commons. You don't have decorum if people are standing up holding up signs in the middle of debates and solemn moments... We encourage protests... But it should be happening at the proper place and at the proper time." DePape's protest featured as the front cover illustration for the book Contempt of Parliament by Kieron Wood, published in Ireland in January 2012.

A few days after her protest in the Senate chamber, Michael Moore offered DePape a job. DePape stated that she had also received job offers from the Public Service Alliance of Canada (PSAC) and the Council of Canadians.

On June 8, 2011, DePape announced the creation of a "Stop Harper Fund" to support "organizations and individuals engaging in creative non-violent direct actions against the Harper government's agenda." The fund planned to organize an advisory committee to direct funds to selected organizations, and legal and fiscal governance to ensure the donations were spent in accordance with the fund's stated mandate.

== Other protests and activism ==
Between June 26–27, 2010, DePape participated in protests at the G20 summit in Toronto. On September 26, 2011, she took part in a protest on Parliament Hill against Alberta oil sands development and TransCanada Corp.'s proposed Keystone XL pipeline. On April 23, 2012, DePape was again silently protesting in an unofficial page uniform, this time outdoors and apparently against Alberta's provincial Wildrose party, when she was photographed holding a sign reading "Stop Harper's Gang" when Danielle Smith (leader of the Wildrose party) cast her vote. On November 20, 2014, DePape was arrested as part of a protest against Kinder Morgan on Burnaby Mountain, BC.

== Theatre ==
DePape wrote the one-woman play She Rules with Iron Stix, which she performed in Ottawa, Winnipeg, and Saskatoon at fringe theatre festivals, as well as the TEDxYouthOttawa conference. DePape missed her convocation ceremony at the University of Ottawa to do media interviews.
