= Emma Hunter (actress) =

Canadian actress and comedian

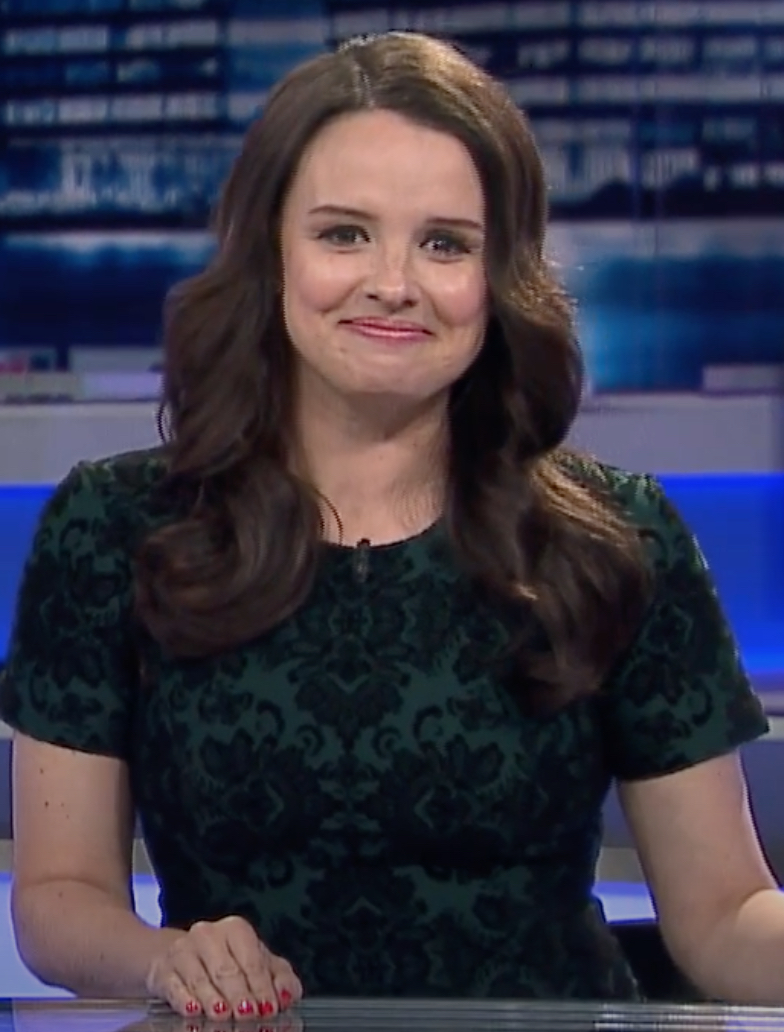
- Hunter in 2020
- Born: 1984 or 1985 (age 41–42)
- Occupations: Actress, Comedian
- Years active: 2010s-present

Emma Hunter (born 1984 or 1985) is a Canadian actress and comedian. She is known for her recurring role as Nisha in the sitcom Mr. D, and as co-anchor with Miguel Rivas of the news satire series The Beaverton. She has also appeared in several other productions, including the television series L.A. Complex and Royal Canadian Air Farce, and the independent feature film Mary Goes Round (2018). In 2017, she was featured in the CBC web series How to Buy a Baby, and in 2020 she hosted the reality cooking competition series Fridge Wars.

In 2018, Hunter received three Canadian Screen Award nominations at the 6th Canadian Screen Awards, in the categories of Best Supporting Actress in a Comedy Program or Series for Mr. D, Best Ensemble Performance in a Variety or Sketch Comedy Program or Series for The Beaverton, and Best Actress in a Web Program or Series for Save Me. She won the award for Best Actress in a Web Program or Series. She was also co-host of the televised Canadian Screen Awards gala, alongside Jonny Harris. In 2020, she narrated a portion of the 8th Canadian Screen Awards.

In 2021, she appeared as a guest judge in a second season episode of Canada's Drag Race. She also co-starred in the CBC dramedy series Moonshine.

In 2026 she appeared as Laura in the comedy film The Snake.

== Awards and nominations ==
Year	Award	Category	Work	Result	Ref.
2018	6th Canadian Screen Awards	Best Supporting Actress in a Comedy Program or Series	Mr. D	Nominated	
2018	6th Canadian Screen Awards	Best Ensemble Performance in a Variety or Sketch Comedy Program or Series	The Beaverton	Nominated	
2018	6th Canadian Screen Awards	Best Actress in a Web Program or Series	Save Me	Won	
2020	8th Canadian Screen Awards	Best Writing in a Variety or Sketch Comedy Program or Series	The Beaverton ("Episode 304")	Nominated	
2020	8th Canadian Screen Awards	Best Ensemble Performance in a Variety or Sketch Comedy Program or Series	The Beaverton	Nominated	
2020	8th Canadian Screen Awards	Best Supporting Performance in a Web Program or Series	How to Buy a Baby	Won	
2022	10th Canadian Screen Awards	Best Supporting Actress, Drama	Moonshine	Nominated	
