= List of Canadian films of 2023 =

List

This is a list of Canadian films released in 2023:

| Title | Director | Cast | Notes | Ref |
|---|---|---|---|---|
| 6 Minutes per Kilometre (6 minutes/km) | Catherine Boivin | | | |
| 299 Queen Street West | Sean Menard | | Documentary about the early years of MuchMusic | |
| 500 Days in the Wild | Dianne Whelan | | | |
| Adaptation | Jake Thomas | | | |
| Adventures in the Land of Asha (Jules au pays d'Asha) | Sophie Farkas Bolla | | | |
| Aftercare | Anubha Momin | | | |
| Afterwards (Après-coups) | Romane Garant Chartrand | | | |
| Aitamaako'tamisskapi Natosi: Before the Sun | Banchi Hanuse | | | |
| All the Days of May (Tous les jours de mai) | Miryam Charles | | | |
| Altona | Heath Affolter, Jon Affolter, Nathan Affolter, Thomas Affolter | Tyler Pelke | | |
| Analogue Revolution: How Feminist Media Changed the World | Marusya Bociurkiw | Carole Pope | | |
| Aphasia (Aphasie) | Marielle Dalpé | | | |
| Asog | Seán Devlin | Rey Aclao, Arnel Pablo, Ricky Gacho Jr. | | |
| Atikamekw Suns (Soleils Atikamekw) | Chloé Leriche | Jacques Newashish, Mirotansa Chilton, Wikwasa Newashish | | |
| Backspot | D. W. Waterson | Devery Jacobs, Evan Rachel Wood | | |
| The Beast | Bertrand Bonello | Léa Seydoux, George MacKay | Canada-France coproduction | |
| Better Days | Joan Carr-Wiggin | Sonja Smits | | |
| Beyond Paper (Au-delà du papier) | Oana Suteu Khintirian | | | |
| Billie Blue (Cœur de slush) | Mariloup Wolfe | Liliane Skelly, Camille Felton, Joseph Delorey, François Létourneau | | |
| BlackBerry | Matt Johnson | Glenn Howerton, Jay Baruchel | | |
| Bloom | Kasey Lum | | | |
| Boat People | Thao Lam, Kjell Boersma | | | |
| Boil Alert | Stevie Salas, James Burns | Layla Staats | | |
| The Boy in the Woods | Rebecca Snow | Jett Klyne, Richard Armitage, Christopher Heyerdahl, Ari Millen | | |
| The Burning Season | Sean Garrity | Jonas Chernick, Sara Canning, Joe Pingue | | |
| Café Daughter | Shelley Niro | Violah Beauvais, Sera-Lys McArthur, Billy Merasty | | |
| Caiti Blues | Justine Harbonnier | | | |
| Cascade | Egidio Coccimiglio | Sara Waisglass, Allegra Fulton, Joel Oulette | | |
| Close to You | Dominic Savage | Elliot Page, Hillary Baack | Canada-UK coproduction | |
| Coco Farm (Coco Ferme) | Sébastien Gagné | Oscar Desgagnés, Joey Bélanger, Emma Bao Linh Tourné, Benoît Brière, Simon Lacroix | | |
| Coven | Rama Rau | Laura Hokstad, Andra Zlatescu, Ayo Leilani | | |
| Cover Your Ears | Sean Patrick Shaul | | Documentary that examines the cause and effect of music censorship | |
| A Crab in the Pool (Un trou dans la poitrine) | Jean-Sébastien Hamel, Alexandra Myotte | | | |
| Crush: Message in a Bottle | Maya Gallus | | | |
| Cynara | Sherien Barsoum | Cindy Ali, James Lockyer | | |
| Daniel the Weaver (Daniel le tisserand) | Julien Cadieux | | | |
| Daughter of the Sun | Ryan Ward | Ryan Ward, Nyah Perkin | | |
| Days (Les Jours) | Geneviève Dulude-De Celles | | | |
| Days of Happiness (Les Jours heureux) | Chloé Robichaud | Sophie Desmarais, Sylvain Marcel, Nour Belkhiria, Maude Guérin, Yves Jacques | | |
| The Dead Don't Hurt | Viggo Mortensen | Viggo Mortensen, Vicky Krieps, Garret Dillahunt, Solly McLeod | Canada-Mexico-Denmark coproduction | |
| Death to the Bikini! (À mort le bikini!) | Justine Gauthier | Mia Garnier | | |
| Diary of a Father (Journal d'un père) | Claude Demers | | | |
| The Dishwasher (Le Plongeur) | Francis Leclerc | Henri Richer-Picard, Charles-Aubey Houde, Joan Hart | Based on the novel by Stéphane Larue | |
| The Dogs | Valerie Buhagiar | Kathleen Munroe, Kris Holden-Ried, Dylan Taylor, Patrice Goodman, Stuart Hughes, Clare Coulter | | |
| Door Mouse | Avan Jogia | Hayley Law, Famke Janssen, Keith Powers, Donal Logue | | |
| Doubles | Ian Harnarine | Errol Sitahal, Sanjiv Boodhu | | |
| Drop | Ramin Eshraghi-Yazdi | Christopher Clare, Shemar Herbert, Michael Burt Ian Brice. Nima Fard, Renee Amber | | |
| Dusk for a Hitman (Crépuscule pour un tueur) | Raymond St-Jean | Éric Bruneau, Benoît Gouin, Sylvain Marcel, Rose-Marie Perreault | | |
| Echo to Delta (Écho à Delta) | Patrick Boivin | | | |
| The Eighth Floor (Le huitième étage, jours de révolte) | Pedro Ruiz | Jacques Lanctôt, Martin Dubreuil | | |
| Emptiness | Onur Karaman | | | |
| L'Empremier Live at Beaubassin (1970) | Rémi Belliveau | Rémi Belliveau, Katrine Noël, Mico Roy, Jason LeBlanc, Pierre-Guy Blanchard, Marie-Andrée Gaudet | | |
| Enter the Drag Dragon | Lee Demarbre | | | |
| Evergreen$ (Sapin$) | Stéphane Moukarzel | Étienne Galloy, Diane Rouxel, Tyrone Benskin, Thy Sros, Conrad Pla, Rémi Goulet | | |
| Eviction (Éviction) | Mathilde Capone | | | |
| Express | Ivan D. Ossa | | | |
| Families' Albums (Albums de familles) | Moïa Jobin-Paré | | | |
| Farador | Édouard Albernhe Tremblay | Eric K. Boulianne, Catherine Brunet, Benoit Drouin-Germain, Lucien Ratio, Marc-Antoine Marceau | | |
| Les Filles du Roi | Corey Payette | Julie McIsaac, Kaitlyn Yott, Raes Calvert | | |
| Finality of Dusk | Madison Thomas | Marika Sila, Cherrel Holder, Meegwun Fairbrother | | |
| Fire-Jo-Ball | Audrey Nantel-Gagnon | | | |
| Fitting In | Molly McGlynn | Maddie Ziegler, Emily Hampshire | | |
| Float | Sherren Lee | Robbie Amell, Andrea Bang, Andrew Bachelor, Ghazal Azarbad, Rukiya Bernard, Michelle Krusiec | | |
| Frontiers (Frontières) | Guy Édoin | Pascale Bussières, Micheline Lanctôt, Christine Beaulieu | | |
| The G | Karl R. Hearne | Dale Dickey, Romane Denis, Roc Lafortune, Bruce Ramsay, Jonathan Koensgen | | |
| Gaby's Hills (Gaby les collines) | Zoé Pelchat | Lou Thompson, Emmanuel Bilodeau, Catherine De Léan, Robin L'Houmeau | | |
| Gamma Rays (Les rayons gamma) | Henry Bernadet | Yassine Jabrane, Chaïmaa Zineddine Elidrissi, Océane Garçon-Gravel, Chris Kanyembuga, Hani Laroum | | |
| Gamodi | Felix Kalmenson | Matt Shally, Maqzime Rauch, Luka Chachxiani | | |
| Going In | Evan Rissi | Evan Rissi, Ira Goldman, Alan Shane Lewis | | |
| Hailey Rose | Sandi Somers | Em Haine, Caitlynne Medrek, Kari Matchett | | |
| Hate to Love: Nickelback | Leigh Brooks | Nickelback | | |
| Heat Spell (L'Été des chaleurs) | Marie-Pier Dupuis | Gabrielle Poulin, Agathe Ledoux, Simone Ledoux | | |
| Hell of a Summer | Finn Wolfhard, Billy Bryk | | | |
| Hey, Viktor! | Cody Lightning | Cody Lightning, Hannah Cheesman, Adam Beach | | |
| Humanist Vampire Seeking Consenting Suicidal Person (Vampire humaniste cherche suicidaire consentant) | Ariane Louis-Seize | Sara Montpetit, Antoine Bénard | | |
| Hurricane Boy Fuck You Tabarnak! (L'Ouragan Fuck You Tabarnak!) | Ara Ball | Justin Labelle, Julie Le Breton, Antoine Olivier Pilon, Karine Gonthier-Hyndman, Martin Dubreuil, Larissa Corriveau, Émile Schneider | Expansion of Ball's 2013 short film of the same name | |
| The Hyperborean | Jesse Thomas Cook | Liv Collins, Tony Burgess, Jessica Vano, Ry Barrett | | |
| I Am Sirat | Deepa Mehta, Sirat Taneja | Sirat Taneja | | |
| I Don't Know Who You Are | M. H. Murray | Mark Clennon | | |
| I Used to Be Funny | Ally Pankiw | Rachel Sennott, Dani Kind, Ennis Esmer, Jason Jones | | |
| I Used to Live There | Ryan McKenna | | | |
| I'm Just Here for the Riot | Kathleen Jayme, Asia Youngman | | Documentary about the 2011 Vancouver Stanley Cup riot | |
| In Flames | Zarrar Kahn | Ramesha Nawal, Bakhtawar Mazhar | Pakistani-Canadian coproduction | |
| Infinity Pool | Brandon Cronenberg | Mia Goth, Alexander Skarsgård, Cleopatra Coleman | | |
| Ireland Blue Book (Irlande cahier bleu) | Olivier Godin | | | |
| Irena's Vow | Louise Archambault | Sophie Nélisse, Dougray Scott, Andrzej Seweryn, Eliza Rycembel | Canadian-Polish coproduction | |
| Jane Goodall: Reasons for Hope | David Lickley | Jane Goodall | | |
| Jour de Merde | Kevin T. Landry | Eve Ringuette, Réal Bossé, Valérie Blais, Louka Amadeo Bélanger-Leos, Isabelle Giroux | | |
| July Talk: Love Lives Here | Brittany Farhat | Peter Dreimanis, Leah Fay Goldstein | | |
| Kanaval | Henri Pardo | | | |
| Katak: The Brave Beluga (Katak, le brave béluga) | Christine Dallaire-Dupont, Nicola Lemay | Robert Naylor, Alexandre Bacon, Ginette Reno, Mark Camacho, Benoît Brière, Angela Galuppo | | |
| Katshinau | Julien G. Marcotte, Jani Bellefleur-Kaltush | | | |
| The King Tide | Christian Sparkes | Frances Fisher, Lara Jean Chorostecki, Clayne Crawford, Michael Greyeyes | | |
| Lake Baikal (Baigal Nuur) | Alisi Telengut | | | |
| Leilani's Fortune | Loveleen Kaur | Witch Prophet | | |
| Little Jesus (Petit Jésus) | Julien Rigoulot | Antoine Bertrand, Gérard Darmon | Canada-France coproduction | |
| The Longest Goodbye | Ido Mizrahy | | | |
| Madeleine | Raquel Sancinetti | | | |
| Mademoiselle Kenopsia | Denis Côté | Larissa Corriveau, Évelyne de la Chenelière | | |
| Making Babies (Faire un enfant) | Eric K. Boulianne | | | |
| Manufacturing the Threat | Amy Miller | John Nuttall, Amanda Korody | | |
| Marie. Eduardo. Sophie. | Thomas Corriveau | | | |
| The Martini Shot | Stephen Wallis | Matthew Modine, Stuart Townsend, Fiona Glascott, John Cleese, Derek Jacobi, Morgana Robinson, Jason London | Ireland-Canada co-production; premiered at Galway Film Fleadh | |
| Max Funk: Pour ton funk seulement | Alexandre Dubois, Alexandre B. Lampron, Guy Chagnon, Benoît Ash | | | |
| Meteor | Atefeh Khademolreza | | | |
| Mockingbird | Sean Garrity | Jonas Chernick | | |
| Modern Goose | Karsten Wall | | | |
| MONSTR | Tank Standing Buffalo | | | |
| Mother of All Shows | Melissa D'Agostino | Melissa D'Agostino, Wendie Malick, Darryl Hinds, Ann Pornel | | |
| Mother Saigon (Má Sài Gòn) | Khoa Lê | | | |
| Motherland | Jasmin Mozaffari | | | |
| Mothers and Monsters | Édith Jorisch | | | |
| Mr. Dressup: The Magic of Make-Believe | Robert McCallum | Ernie Coombs, Judith Lawrence | | |
| Muscat | Philippe Grenier | Ilyes Tarmasti, Mahmoud Zabennej, Mahmoud Zabennej | | |
| My Animal | Jacqueline Castel | | | |
| My Mother's Men (Les Hommes de ma mère) | Anik Jean | Léane Labrèche-Dor, Marc Messier, Patrick Huard | | |
| The Nature of Love (Simple comme Sylvain) | Monia Chokri | Magalie Lépine-Blondeau, Pierre-Yves Cardinal | | |
| On Earth as in Heaven (Sur la terre comme au ciel) | Nathalie Saint-Pierre | Lou Thompson, Philomène Bilodeau, Édith Cochrane | | |
| One Summer (Le Temps d'un été) | Louise Archambault | Patrice Robitaille, Guy Nadon, Élise Guilbault, Martin Dubreuil | | |
| Orah | Lonzo Nzekwe | Oyin Oladejo, Lucky Ejim | | |
| Outside Center | Eli Jean Tahchi | Desmond Grant | | |
| Perséides | Laurence Lévesque | | | |
| Polarized | Shamim Sarif | Holly Deveaux, Maxine Denis | | |
| Queen of Bones | Robert Budreau | Julia Butters, Jacob Tremblay, Martin Freeman, Taylor Schilling | | |
| The Queen of My Dreams | Fawzia Mirza | Amrit Kaur, Nimra Bucha, Hamza Haq | | |
| Queen Tut | Reem Morsi | Ryan Ali, Dani Jazzar, Alexandra Billings, Thom Allison | | |
| A Quiet Girl | Adrian Wills | | | |
| Re: Uniting | Laura Adkin | | | |
| Red Rooms (Les chambres rouges) | Pascal Plante | Juliette Gariépy, Laurie Babin, Elisabeth Locas, Maxwell McCabe-Lokos | | |
| Redlights | Eva Thomas | | | |
| A Respectable Woman (Une femme respectable) | Bernard Émond | Hélène Florent, Martin Dubreuil | | |
| Return to Hairy Hill (Retour à Hairy Hill) | Daniel Gies | | | |
| Richelieu | Pier-Philippe Chevigny | Ariane Castellanos, Marc-André Grondin, Micheline Bernard, Nelson Coronado | | |
| Romi | Robert Cuffley | | | |
| Ru | Charles-Olivier Michaud | Chloé Djandji, Chantal Thuy, Karine Vanasse, Patrice Robitaille | | |
| The Sacrifice Game | Jenn Wexler | | | |
| Satan Wants You | Steve J. Adams, Sean Horlor | | | |
| Sawo Matang | Andrea Nirmala Widjajanto | | | |
| Seagrass | Meredith Hama-Brown | Ally Maki, Luke Roberts, Chris Pang, Sarah Gadon | | |
| Seven Veils | Atom Egoyan | Amanda Seyfried | | |
| She Talks to Strangers | Bruce Sweeney | Camille Sullivan, Jeff Gladstone, Gabrielle Rose | | |
| Silvicola | Jean-Philippe Marquis | | | |
| Simulant | April Mullen | | | |
| The Skates (Les Patins) | Halima Ouardiri | | | |
| Solo | Sophie Dupuis | Théodore Pellerin, Félix Maritaud, Anne-Marie Cadieux | | |
| Someone Lives Here | Zack Russell | Khaleel Seivwright | | |
| Stormy Weather (Le temps des orages) | Gabrielle Gingras | Nora-Lee Roy, Adèle Moreau, Tyana Savard, Romain Gélinas, Mélanie Nadeau | | |
| Subterranean | François-Xavier De Ruydts | | | |
| Summer of 2000 (Été 2000) | Virginie Nolin, Laurence Olivier | Millie-Jeanne Drouin, Jeana Arseneau, Dylan Walsh | | |
| Summer Qamp | Jen Markowitz | | | |
| Supporting Our Selves | Lulu Wei | | | |
| Suze | Dane Clark, Linsey Stewart | Michaela Watkins, Charlie Gillespie, Sara Waisglass, Aaron Ashmore, Rainbow Sun Francks, Sandy Jobin-Bevans, Sorika Wolf | | |
| Swan Song | Chelsea McMullan | Karen Kain | | |
| Sweet Sixteen (Sucré seize) | Alexa-Jeanne Dubé | | | |
| Sweetland | Christian Sparkes | Mark Lewis Jones, Sara Canning, Mary Walsh, Andy Jones, Lawrence Barry | | |
| Tautuktavuk (What We See) | Carol Kunnuk, Lucy Tulugarjuk | | | |
| Tell Me Why These Things Are So Beautiful (Dis-moi pourquoi ces choses sont si belles) | Lyne Charlebois | Mylène Mackay, Alexandre Goyette, Marianne Farley | | |
| Testament | Denys Arcand | Rémy Girard, Sophie Lorain, Marie-Mai, Guylaine Tremblay | | |
| There's a Star (Y'a une étoile) | Julien Cadieux | | | |
| This Is Not About Swimming | Marni Van Dyk | | | |
| This Time | Robert Vaughn | | | |
| Thriving: A Dissociated Reverie | Nicole Bazuin | Kitoko Mai | | |
| Through the Night (Quitter la nuit) | Delphine Girard | Selma Alaoui, Guillaume Duhesme, Veerle Baetens, Anne Dorval | Belgian, French and Canadian coproduction | |
| tOuch | Todd Max Carey | | | |
| Turtles (Les Tortues) | David Lambert | Olivier Gourmet, Dave Johns, Brigitte Poupart | | |
| Twice Colonized | Lin Alluna | Aaju Peter | | |
| Under Influence (Emma sous influence) | Noël Mitrani | Natacha Mitrani, Abby Buist | | |
| Union Street | Jamila Pomeroy | | | |
| Undertaker for Life! | Georges Hannan | | | |
| Until You Die (Jusqu'à ce que tu meures) | Florence Lafond | Marine Johnson, Anthony Therrien | | |
| Upstream | Xin Liu | | | |
| Valley of Exile | Anna Fahr | Maria Hassan, Hala Hosni, Michel Hourani | | |
| Veranada | Dominique Chaumont | | | |
| Vibrations from Gaza | Rehab Nazzal | | | |
| Victoire (La Cordonnière) | François Bouvier | Rose-Marie Perreault, Pierre-Yves Cardinal | | |
| Virga | Jean-François Leblanc | | | |
| WaaPaKe | Jules Arita Koostachin | | | |
| The Wall Street Boy (Kipkemboi) | Charles Uwagbai | Thamela Mpumlwana, Vinessa Antoine, David Cubitt, Kevin Hanchard | | |
| Warrior Strong | Shane Belcourt | Andrew Dice Clay, Jordan Johnson-Hinds, Sarah Podemski | | |
| We Are Zombies | RKSS | Alexandre Nachi, Vincent Leclerc | | |
| When Adam Changes (Adam change lentement) | Joël Vaudreuil | Simon Lacroix | | |
| The White Guard (La Garde blanche) | Julien Élie | | | |
| Who's Yer Father? | Jeremy Larter | Chris Locke, Susan Kent, Jess Salgueiro, Matt Wells, Kaniehtiio Horn, Steve Lund | | |
| Wild Feast (Festin boréal) | Robert Morin | | | |
| Wild Goat Surf | Caitlyn Sponheimer | Shayelin Martin, Leandro Guedes, Dyllón Burnside, Caitlyn Sponheimer, Brittany Drisdelle | | |
| With Love and a Major Organ | Kim Albright | Anna Maguire, Hamza Haq, Veena Sood | | |
| Without Precedent: The Supreme Life of Rosalie Abella | Barry Avrich | Rosalie Abella | | |
| The Worlds Divide | Denver Jackson | | | |
| Xie Xie, Ollie | James Michael Chiang | | | |
| You'll Never Know (Tu ne sauras jamais) | Robin Aubert | | | |
| Zoe.mp4 | Jeremy Lutter | Emily Tennant, Julia Sarah Stone, Osric Chau | | |

== See also ==
- 2023 in Canadian television
