= 2023 Festival du nouveau cinéma =

Film festival in Montreal, Canada

- Opening film: The Taste of Things (La Passion de Dodin Bouffant) by Tran Anh Hung
- Closing film: The Animal Kingdom (Le Rène animal) by Thomas Cailley
- Location: Montreal, Quebec, Canada
- Founded: 1971
- Festival date: October 4 - 15, 2023
- Website: nouveaucinema.ca/en

Festival du nouveau cinéma
- 2024 2022

The 2023 edition of the Festival du nouveau cinéma, the 52nd edition in the event's history, took place from October 4 to 15, 2023 in Montreal, Quebec, Canada.

The festival opened with The Taste of Things (La Passion de Dodin Bouffant) by Tran Anh Hung, and closed with The Animal Kingdom (Le Rène animal) by Thomas Cailley.

== Awards ==
Award winners were announced on October 15 at the conclusion of the festival.

Award	Film	Filmmaker
National Competition, Grand Prize	Humanist Vampire Seeking Consenting Suicidal Person (Vampire humaniste cherche suicidaire consentant)	Ariane Louis-Seize
National Competition, Prix de la diffusion Québécor	Seagrass	Meredith Hama-Brown
International Competition, Grand Prize	The Settlers (Los Colonos)	Felipe Gálvez Haberle
International Competition, Prix de l’innovation Daniel Langlois	Birdland (Indivision)	Leïla Kilani
International Competition, Best Acting Performance	The Bride	Sandra Umulisa
International Competition, FIPRESCI Prize	How to Have Sex	Molly Manning Walker
New Alchemists Prize	Allensworth	James Benning
New Alchemists Prize, Honorable Mention	Open-Pit (Cielo abierto)	Felipe Esparza Pérez
Fierté Montréal Prize for Best LGBTQ Film	Power Alley (Levante)	Lillah Halla
Fierté Montréal Prize for Best LGBTQ Film, Honorable Mention	The Bride	Myriam U. Birara
Panorama Public Prize	Junkyard Dog (Chien de la casse)	Jean-Baptiste Durand
Temps 0 Public Prize	Mars Express	Jérémie Périn
TV5 Public Prize for Best Francophone Film	Atikamekw Suns (Soleils Atikamekw)	Chloé Leriche
P'tits Loups	Funny Birds (Drôles d'oiseaux)	Charlie Belin
P'tits Loups, Honorable Mention	The Spyglass (Kikaren)	Malin Erixon
FNC Explore Panorama Prize	Over the Rainbow	Craig Quintero
FNC Explore Panorama Prize, Honorable Mention	Cycle of Violence	Felicia Bergström
FNC Explore Horizon Prize	Meneath: The Mirrors of Ethics	Terril Calder
National Competition, Short Film	Summer of 2000 (Été 2000)	Virginie Nolin, Laurence Olivier
National Competition, Short Film Honorable Mention	Gaby's Hills (Gaby les collines)	Zoé Pelchat
National Competition, Short Film Public Prize	Mothers and Monsters	Édith Jorisch
International Competition, Short Film	Oyu	Atsushi Hirai
International Competition, Short Film Honorable Mention	8	Anaïs-Tohé Commaret
New Alchemists, Animated Short Film	AliEN0089	Valeria Hoffmann
New Alchemists, National Dada Prize	Lake Baikal (Baigal Nuur)	Alisi Telengut
New Alchemists, International Dada Prize	Bloom	Helena Girón, Samuel M. Delgado
New Alchemists, International Dada Prize Honorable Mention	Blank Photograph	Che-Yu Hsu
RPCÉ Grand Prize	Sun, Moon and Four Peaks	Kevin Jin Kwan Kim
RCPÉ Jeune Loup Prize	Dynamite, Fish Head! (Dynamite, tête de poisson!)	William Brunelle, Anna-Eve Cusson, Yorann Lapierre
RCPÉ Jeune Loup Prize, Honorable Mention	All In	Rosalie Rémillard, Philippe Vanasse-Paquet

== Official selections ==
=== International Competition ===
English title	Original title	Director(s)	Production country
Between Revolutions		Vlad Petri	Romania, Croatia, Qatar, Iran
Birdland	Indivision	Leïla Kilani	France, Morocco
The Bride		Myriam U. Birara	Rwanda
The Face of the Jellyfish	El Rostro de la medusa	Melisa Liebenthal	Argentina
How to Have Sex		Molly Manning Walker	United Kingdom
Inside the Yellow Cocoon Shell	Bên trong vỏ kén vàng	Phạm Thiên Ân	Vietnam, Singapore, France, Spain
Orlando, My Political Biography	Orlando, ma biographie politique	Paul B. Preciado	France
The Settlers	Los Colonos	Felipe Gálvez Haberle	Chile, Argentina, France, Denmark, United Kingdom, Taiwan, Sweden, Germany
Sweet Dreams		Ena Sendijarević	Netherlands, Sweden, Indonesia, France
The Feeling That the Time for Doing Something Has Passed		Joanna Arnow	United States

=== National Competition ===
English title	Original title	Director(s)	Production country
Atikamekw Suns	Soleils Atikamekw	Chloé Leriche	Canada
Days of Happiness	Les Jours heureux	Chloé Robichaud	Canada
Gamodi		Felix Kalmenson	Canada
Humanist Vampire Seeking Consenting Suicidal Person	Vampire humaniste cherche suicidaire consentant	Ariane Louis-Seize	Canada
Hurricane Boy Fuck You Tabarnak!	L'Ouragan Fuck You Tabarnak!	Ara Ball	Canada
Seagrass		Meredith Hama-Brown	Canada
When Adam Changes	Adam change lentement	Joël Vaudreuil	Canada

=== International Panorama ===
English title	Original title	Director(s)	Production country
Animal		Sofia Exarchou	Greece, Austria, Bulgaria, Romania, Cyprus
Banel & Adama	Banel et Adama	Ramata-Toulaye Sy	France, Senegal, Mali
Chicken for Linda!	Linda veut du poulet!	Sébastien Laudenbach, Chiara Malta	France
Here		Bas Devos	Belgium
Junkyard Dog	Chien de la casse	Jean-Baptiste Durand	France
#Mito		Daisuke Miyazaki	Japan
No Love Lost	La Fille de son père	Erwan Le Duc	France
The Old Oak		Ken Loach	United Kingdom, France, Belgium
Omen	Augure	Baloji	Belgium, Republic of the Congo, Netherlands, France, Germany, South Africa
Power Alley	Levante	Lillah Halla	Brazil
Samsara		Lois Patiño	Spain
Smoke Sauna Sisterhood	Savvusanna sõsarad	Anna Hints	Estonia, France, Iceland
Tótem		Lila Avilés	Mexico, Denmark, France

=== The New Alchemists (Les Nouveaux alchimistes) ===
English title	Original title	Director(s)	Production country
Allensworth		James Benning	United States
The Breath of Life	Nummer achttien	Guido van der Werve	Netherlands
The Human Surge 3	El Auge del Humano 3	Eduardo Williams	Argentina, Portugal, Brazil, Netherlands, Taiwan, Hong Kong, Sri Lanka, Peru
Mammalia		Sebastian Mihăilescu	Romania, Poland, Germany
Mannvirki		Gustav Geir Bollason	Iceland, France
Music		Angela Schanelec	Germany, France, Serbia
Open-Pit	Cielo abierto	Felipe Esparza Pérez	Peru, France
V F C		C. S. Roy	Canada
Wild Feast	Festin boréal	Robert Morin	Canada

=== The Essentials (Les Incontournables) ===
English title	Original title	Director(s)	Production country
About Dry Grasses	Kuru Otlar Üstüne	Nuri Bilge Ceylan	Turkey, France, Germany, Sweden
Anatomy of a Fall	Anatomie d'une chute	Justine Triet	France
The Beast	La Bête	Bertrand Bonello	France, Canada
A Brighter Tomorrow	Il sol dell'avvenire	Nanni Moretti	Italy, France
La Chimera		Alice Rohrwacher	Italy, France, Switzerland
Do Not Expect Too Much from the End of the World	Nu astepta prea mult de la sfârsitul lumii	Radu Jude	Romania
Evil Does Not Exist	悪は存在しない	Ryûsuke Hamaguchi	Japan
Fallen Leaves	Kuolleet lehdet	Aki Kaurismäki	Finland, Germany
Four Daughters	بنات ألفة	Kaouther Ben Hania	France, Tunisia, Germany, Saudi Arabia
In Our Day		Hong Sang-soo	South Korea
Kidnapped	Rapito	Marco Bellocchio	Italy, France, Germany
Last Summer	L'Été dernier	Catherine Breillat	France
Lost in the Night	Perdidos en la noche	Amat Escalante	Mexico, Germany, Netherlands, Denmark
May December		Todd Haynes	United States
MMXX		Cristi Puiu	Romania, Moldova, France
Monster	怪物	Hirokazu Kore-eda	Japan
Our Body	Notre corps	Claire Simon	France
Perfect Days		Wim Wenders	Japan
Priscilla		Sofia Coppola	United States, Italy
Seven Veils		Atom Egoyan	Canada
The Zone of Interest		Jonathan Glazer	United Kingdom, Poland, United States

=== Temps 0 ===
In addition to the already-announced lineup, a surprise screening of Quentin Dupieux's film Yannick was announced after the festival opening.

English title	Original title	Director(s)	Production country
Challenge of the Tiger		Bruce Le	Hong Kong, Italy, United States
Dangerous Encounters of the First Kind		Tsui Hark	Hong Kong
The Dragon Lives Again		Law Kei	Hong Kong
Enter the Clones of Bruce		David Gregory	United States
Enter the Dragon		Robert Clouse	Hong Kong, United States
Le Garçon qui la nuit		Jérémy Piette	France
The Girls		Kenichi Ugana	Japan
The Invisible Fight		Rainer Sarnet	Estonia, Latvia, Greece, Finland
King of Algiers	Omar la fraise	Elias Belkeddar	France, Algeria
The Last Cartoon: Nonsense, Optimistic, Pessimistic		Bertrand Mandico	France
Mars Express		Jérémie Périn	France
Mon p'tit papa		Mahaut Adam	France
Ninja Strikes Back		Bruce Le	Hong Kong, France
Rainer, a Vicious Dog in a Skull Valley		Bertrand Mandico	France
Shadow of Fire	Hokage	Shinya Tsukamoto	Japan
She Is Conann		Bertrand Mandico	France
Six Singing Women		Yoshimasa Ishibashi	Japan
Thick and Thin	Tout fout le camp	Sébastien Betbeder	France
Visitors		Kenichi Ugana	Japan
Yannick		Quentin Dupieux	France

=== Special Presentations ===
English title	Original title	Director(s)	Production country
Chip Chip Chopin par Desjardins		Richard Desjardins	Canada
Fitting In		Molly McGlynn	Canada
Irena's Vow		Louise Archambault	Canada
La Japonaise, film-fantôme d’Alain Robbe-Grillet		Céline Ters	France
Mad Max		George Miller	Australia
Mad Max 2		George Miller	Australia
Mad Max Beyond Thunderdome		George Miller, George Ogilvie	Australia
Mad Max: Fury Road		George Miller	Australia
Renouer avec le vivant		Yann Arthus-Bertrand, Jérémy Frey	France
Vibrant	Vivant	Yann Arthus-Bertrand	France

=== History of Cinema ===
English title	Original title	Director(s)	Production country
Ghosts… of the Civil Dead		John Hillcoat	Australia
Journey to Italy		Roberto Rossellini	Italy, France
National Anarchist: Lino Brocka		Khavn De La Cruz	Philippines
Nitrate: To the Ghosts of the 75 Lost Philippine Silent Films (1912-1933)		Khavn De La Cruz	Philippines
Pictures of Ghosts	Retratos Fantasmas	Kleber Mendonça Filho	Brazil
Voyages en Italie		Sophie Letourneur	France

=== Retrospective: The New Cinema of Bertrand Bonello ===
English title	Original title	Director(s)	Production country
The Adventures of James and David	Les Aventures de James et David	Bertrand Bonello	France
Cindy: The Doll Is Mine		Bertrand Bonello	France
Coma		Bertrand Bonello	France
House of Tolerance	L'Apollonide - souvenirs de la maison close	Bertrand Bonello	France
Ingrid Caven: Music and Voice	Ingrid Caven, musique et voix	Bertrand Bonello	France
My New Picture		Bertrand Bonello	France
On War	De la guerre	Bertrand Bonello	France
The Pornographer	Le Pornographe	Bertrand Bonello	France
Sarah Winchester: Ghost Opera	Sarah Winchester, opéra fantôme	Bertrand Bonello	France
Where Are You, Bertrand Bonello?	Où en êtes-vous? (Numéro 2)	Bertrand Bonello	France
Who I Am	Qui je suis	Bertrand Bonello	France

=== International Competition for Short Films ===
English title	Original title	Director(s)	Production country
8		Anaïs-Tohé Commaret	France
A Bird Called Memory	Pássaro Memória	Leonardo Martinelli	Brazil, United Kingdom
Alpha Kings		Enrique Pedraza-Botero, Faye Tsakas	United States
Aykuo		Ayaal Ayaal Adamov	Russia
Been There		Corina Schwingruber Ilić	Switzerland
The Birthday Party	L'Anniversaire d'Enrico	Francesco Sossai	Germany, France, Italy
The Damned Yard	Pátio do Carrasco	André Gil Mata	Portugal
Flores del otro patio		Jorge Cadena	Switzerland, Colombia
Honeymoon		Alkis Papastathopoulos	Greece, Cyprus, France
I Saw the Face of the Devil	J'ai vu le visage du diable	Julia Kowalski	France
Intelligence		Cosme Castro, Jeanne Frenkel	France
Oyu		Atsushi Hirai	Japan, France
Paradise Europe	Du bist so wunderbar	Paulo Menezes, Leandro Goddinho	Germany
Phalène		Sarah-Anaïs Desbenoit	France
The Red Sea Makes Me Wanna Cry		Faris Alrjoob	Germany, Jordan
Sawo Matang		Andrea Nirmala Widjajanto	Indonesia, Canada, United States
Sentimental Stories		Xandra Popescu	Germany
Shrooms		Jorge Jácome	Portugal
A Woman in Makueni		Daria Belova, Valeri Aluskina	Germany, Kenya

=== National Competition for Short Films ===
English title	Original title	Director(s)	Production country
All the Days of May	Tous les jours de mai	Miryam Charles	Canada
Aujourd'hui c'est dimanche, demain on meurt		Maxime Genois	Canada
Dead Cat	Chat mort	Annie-Claude Caron, Danick Audet	Canada
Discordia		Rowan Gray	Canada
Gaby's Hills	Gaby les collines	Zoé Pelchat	Canada
Haunted Hollow		Dominique van Olm	Canada
Heat Spell	L'Été des chaleurs	Marie-Pier Dupuis	Canada
Hir•aeth		Anastasia Itkina	Canada
I Used to Live There		Ryan McKenna	Canada
Katshinau	Les Mains sales	Julien G. Marcotte, Jani Bellefleur-Kaltush	Canada
Les Lavandières		Laura Kamugisha	Canada
Making Babies	Faire un enfant	Eric K. Boulianne	Canada
Mothers and Monsters		Édith Jorisch	Canada
Muscat		Philippe Grenier	Canada
My Tomato Heart	Mon coeur de tomate	Benoît Le Rouzès Ménard	Canada
Ofrandā		Vjosana Shkurti	Canada
Les rois		Olivier Côté	Canada
Soleil de nuit		Fernando Lopez Escriva, Maria Camila Arias	Canada
Something Else	Autre chose	Étienne Lacelle	Canada
Summer of 2000	Été 2000	Virginie Nolin, Laurence Olivier	Canada
Troika		Karl Kai, Robert Mentov	Canada
Vampires, It's Nothing to Laugh At		Kinga Michalska	Canada
What Will You Do When I'm Gone	Majboor-E-Mamool	Haaris Qadri	Canada

=== Special Presentations, Short Films ===
The short films of Ariane Louis-Seize, in conjunction with her feature debut Humanist Vampire Seeking Consenting Suicidal Person (Vampire humaniste cherche suicidaire consentant) in the main national narrative competition.

English title	Original title	Director(s)	Production country
The Depths	Les profondeurs	Ariane Louis-Seize	Canada
Être elles		Ariane Louis-Seize	Canada
Little Waves	Les petites vagues	Ariane Louis-Seize	Canada
Rituals	Rituels	Ariane Louis-Seize	Canada
See You in My Dreams	Visites nocturnes silencieuses	Ariane Louis-Seize	Canada
Shooting Star	Comme une comète	Ariane Louis-Seize	Canada
Wild Skin	La Peau sauvage	Ariane Louis-Seize	Canada

=== The New Alchemists, Short Films ===
English title	Original title	Director(s)	Production country
Acoustic Shadows		Patrick Bergeron	Canada
AliEN0089		Valeria Hoffmann	Chile, Argentina
Aphasia	Aphasie	Marielle Dalpé	Canada
Ardent Other	Le Mal des Ardents	Alice Brygo	France
Artifacts of You, Artifacts of Me		Brecht De Cock	Belgium
Blank Photograph		Che-Yu Hsu	France
Bleu silico		Éloïse Le Gallo, Julia Borderie	France
Bloom		Helena Girón, Samuel M. Delgado	Spain
Center, Ring, Mall		Mateo Vega	Netherlands, Peru
Cyclepaths		Anton Cla	Belgium
The Daughters of Fire	As Filhas do Fogo	Pedro Costa	Portugal
Delight at Robert St.		Milja Viita	Finland, Canada
Dickinsonia		Charline Dally	France, Canada
Dinosauria, We		Maxime-Claude L'Écuyer	Canada
Eschaton Ad		Andrea Gatopoulos	Italy
Every Sunday, Grandma		Laure Prouvost	France, Belgium
Families' Albums	Albums de familles	Moïa Jobin-Paré	Canada
Kinderfilm		Adrian Jonas Haim, Michael Stumpf, Robin Klengel, Total Refusal	Austria
Lake Baikal	Baigal Nuur	Alisi Telengut	Canada
LDN 51.5072N 0.1276W		Wen Pey Lim	United Kingdom
Let's Talk		Simon Liu	United States
NYC RGB		Viktoria Schmid	United States, Austria
Our Pain		Shunsaku Hayashi	Japan
Outlets		Duncan Cowles	United Kingdom
POV Memory		Igor Smola	Azerbaijan, Singapore
Skyscraper Film		Federica Foglia	Italy, Canada
Substrat		Patrick Bergeron, Karl Lemieux	Canada
Sunflower Siege Engine		Sky Hopinka	United States
Syncopated Green		Arjuna Neuman	United Kingdom
The Veiled City		Natalie Cubides-Brady	United Kingdom
Why Are You Image Plus?		Diogo Baldaia	Portugal

=== RPCÉ Canadian Student Short Film Competition ===
English title	Original title	Director(s)	Province
All In		Rosalie Rémillard, Philippe Vanasse-Paquet	Quebec
Among Ashes	Parmi les cendres	Laurent Déry-Lauzier	Quebec
Antitutorial	Antitutoriel	Léonie Savard	Quebec
Ashta		Ryan Bechara	Quebec
The Bleeding Nose	Médium saignant	Marie-Esther Durocher	Quebec
Blink		Marco Lavagnino	Ontario
The Captain's Dream	Le Rêve du capitaine	Yuan Zha, Charles Gourde Talbot	Quebec
The City	La Ville	Kaolin Dhouailly	Quebec
Collateral	Collatéral	Antoine Collins	Quebec
Dans l'ombre		Gabrielle Desrochers, Sarah Blouin, Elsa Champagne	Quebec
The Drawing	Le Dessin	Faiza Benzakour	Quebec
Dynamite, Fish Head!	Dynamite, tête de poisson!	William Brunelle, Anna-Eve Cusson, Yorann Lapierre	Quebec
An Ego and I		Jesu Medina	Quebec
Ephemeral	Éphémère	Dominic Cluzeau	Quebec
Fais ton fric		Brunk Dramatik	Quebec
Fan Day		Sarah Toussaint-Léveillé	Quebec
The Fighter	Nin Kamashitshet	André-Charles Ishpatao	Quebec
Final Breakdown	Dernier breakdown	Jean-Philippe Groulx	Quebec
Hanami		Olivier Basquin	Quebec
Jeu de mémoire		Philippe Cormier	Quebec
Johnny Libertella		Bruno Dramatik	Quebec
Kryptonite		Fleur Cohen-Solal	Quebec
Larsen		Sarah Toussaint-Léveillé	Quebec
Man Is Sick, Man Is Fine		Kit Baronas	British Columbia
An Omelet for Godot	Une omelette pour Godot	Marie Francœur	Quebec
The Outage	La Panne	Elliot Tremblay	Quebec
Papa Guillotine		Namaï Kham Po	Quebec
Parc Ex: The Heart of MTL	Parc-Ex au cœur de MTL	Ayesha Sheikh	Quebec
Perennials		Grant Macintosh	Nova Scotia
Propulsion		Joaquim Trudel	Quebec
Some Dreams Are Just Deceptions	Cuando los sueños se vuelven desilusiones	José Ibáñez	Quebec
Spinning		Emily Tosh	Alberta
Sun, Moon and Four Peaks		Kevin Jin Kwan Kim	British Columbia
Untitled US		Thomas Mai	British Columbia
Writer's Block	Page blanche	Yannick Lessard	Quebec

=== RPCÉ International Student Short Films ===
A selection of student films from the Icelandic Film School.

English title	Original title	Director(s)	Production country
I Don't Want to Feel Better	Iðrun mín Öll	Birkir Kristinsson	Iceland
A Princess's Tale	Skýjaborgin	Magdalena Ólafsdóttir	Iceland
Responsible	Ábyrgð	María Matthíasdóttir	Iceland
Route 7		Óskar Þorri Hörpuson	Iceland
Sophie		Marie Lydie Bierne	Iceland

=== P'tits loups ===
Short film program of animation for children.

English title	Original title	Director(s)	Production country
Animanimals Squirrel		Julia Ocker	Germany
Animanimals T-Rex		Julia Ocker	Germany
Animanimals Tiger		Julia Ocker	Germany
Coin Coin		Anouk Archambault, Amélie Frit, Lucile Grunder, Solenn Lelaisant, Jeanne Marotte	France
Funny Birds	Drôles d'oiseaux	Charlie Belin	France
The Goose	L'Oie du plus fort	Jan Mika	Czech Republic, France
Little Fan		Sveta Yuferova	Germany
My Friend the Dog		Violeta Cortes	France
O Homem das Pernas Altas		Vitor Hugo Rocha	Portugal
Shelter		Julie Daravan Chea	France
Somni		Sonja Rohleder	Germany
Spin & Ella		An Vrombout	Belgium
The Spyglass	Kikaren	Malin Erixon	Sweden
Sunflower	Tournesol	Natalia Chernysheva	France, Russia
The Tiny Voyage	Le Tout petit voyage	Emily Worms	France
To Be Sisters	Entre deux sœurs	Clément Céard, Anne-Sophie Gousset	France
Two One Two		Shira Avni	Canada

=== FNC Explore ===
Virtual reality projects.

English title	Original title	Director(s)	Production country
Age of the Monster	Le Temps du monstre	Benjamin Nuel	France
Cycle of Violence		Felicia Bergstrôm	Germany
Dernier rappel		Colas Wohlfahrt, Emilie Rosas	Canada
ELELE		Sjoerd van Acker	Netherlands
Fresh Memories: The Look		Volodymyr Kolbasa, Ondrej Moravec	Ukraine, Czech Republic
In Search of Time		Pierre Zandrowicz, Matt Tierney	United States
Invisible		Michel Lemieux	Canada
Kabaret		Gina Thorstensen	Norway
Meneath: The Mirrors of Ethics		Terril Calder	Canada
Midnight Story		Antonin Niclass	United Kingdom
Okawari		Landia Egal, Amaury La Burthe	Canada, France
Over the Rainbow		Craig Quintero	Taiwan
Missing 10 Hours		Fanni Fazakas	Hungary
Reimagined Volume II: Mahal		Michaela Ternasky-Holland	United States
Rock, Paper, Scissors		Alex Rühl	United Kingdom
The Soil of the Namib		Christian Zipfel	Germany
We Barbarians	Nous les barbares	Bertrand Mandico	France

=== Estival ===
Film screenings that were held at an outdoor venue in August, several weeks before the regular festival program.

English title	Original title	Director(s)	Production country
August 32nd on Earth	Un 32 août sur Terre	Denis Villeneuve	Canada
The Banshees of Inisherin		Martin McDonagh	United Kingdom, Ireland, United States
Kite Zo A: Leave the Bones	Kite Zo A: laisse les os	Kaveh Nabatian	Canada
Smoking Causes Coughing	Fumer fait tousser	Quentin Dupieux	France
