= 2023 Toronto International Film Festival =

48th edition of Canadian film festival

- Festival poster
- Opening film: The Boy and the Heron by Hayao Miyazaki
- Closing film: Sly by Thom Zimny
- Location: Toronto, Ontario, Canada
- Founded: 1976
- Awards: American Fiction (People's Choice Award)
- Festival date: September 7–17, 2023
- Website: tiff.net/tiff

Toronto International Film Festival
- 2024 2022

The 48th annual Toronto International Film Festival was held from September 7 to 17, 2023.

The festival announced several changes to its programming team for the 2023 festival, following the retirement of Steve Gravestock at the end of 2022 and the death of Ravi Srinivasan in early 2023. Noted changes included Norman Wilner taking over Gravestock's role as programmer of Canadian films, and June Kim succeeding Srinivasan as programmer for South Asian films. The Contemporary World Cinema program was renamed Centrepiece.

The festival indicated that with the 2022 Toronto International Film Festival having returned to "normal" attendance figures following the COVID-19 pandemic in Canada, the event would take place exclusively in-person, ending the online platform that had been offered since the 2020 Toronto International Film Festival. An additional change from past years was that the film market screenings for industry professionals began on September 6, one day earlier than the festival's official opening to the public.

Festival organizers acknowledged that the 2023 SAG-AFTRA strike was likely to impact the festival if not resolved in time, in particular because the strike prevented actors from taking part in promotional appearances to support their films, but indicated that the festival would still proceed even if fewer celebrities than usual were in attendance. The rule did not necessarily bar all American actors from attending the event, however; for instance, as Atom Egoyan's Seven Veils was a Canadian production shot under ACTRA rather than SAG-AFTRA contracts, lead actress Amanda Seyfried remained able to attend the premiere, though she ultimately chose not to attend. As well, several films in the 2023 program were directed by notable movie stars, who were able to attend the premieres in their capacity as directors. The festival indicated that overall, 70 per cent of its planned program for 2023 came from independent and/or international producers, and would not be affected by the strike.

In 2024, chief executive officer Anita Lee confirmed that despite the ongoing strike, attendance at the 2023 festival was up compared to 2022, although still short of the pre-pandemic highs of the 2019 Toronto International Film Festival.

== Key programming announcements ==
The first film in the festival's 2023 program, Taika Waititi's Next Goal Wins, was announced on June 28. Ladj Ly's Les Indésirables and Atom Egoyan's Seven Veils were announced in July, prior to the announcement of the full Gala and Special Presentations programs on July 24. The TIFF Docs lineup followed on July 26.

The festival's opener was the Japanese animated film The Boy and the Heron by Hayao Miyazaki, which marked the first time in history that an animated film opened the festival. It concluded with Sly, Thom Zimny's documentary film about actor Sylvester Stallone; Stallone also participated in an In Conversation event in conjunction with the film.

In Conversation events were held with film director Pedro Almodóvar and actors Lee Byung-hun, Park Seo-jun and Andy Lau. Lee and Park costarred in the TIFF premiere Concrete Utopia, Lau starred in the TIFF premiere The Movie Emperor, and Almodóvar's talk was paired with the North American premiere of his short film Strange Way of Life (Extraña forma de vida).

Punjab '95, by Indian director Honey Trahan, was originally announced in the "Gala Presentations" section, but was pulled out from the festival. TIFF clarified that the film was pulled by its Indian distributor, with sources telling Variety that political pressure was being applied to the distributor due to the film's "potentially incendiary" content.

The festival also staged a special 40th anniversary screening of a new 4K restoration of the classic concert film Stop Making Sense.

The festival's annual "Rising Stars" program, a networking and development program for emerging actors in festival films, spotlighted Adwa Bader (NAGA), Almudena González (The Ravaging Wind), Amrit Kaur (The Queen of My Dreams), Aria Mia Loberti (All the Light We Cannot See), Cody Lightning (Hey, Viktor!), Kudakwashe Rutendo (Backspot), Léah Aubert (Sisterhood), Mark Clennon (I Don't Know Who You Are) and Tioreore Ngatai-Melbourne (The Convert).

== Awards ==
=== TIFF Tribute Awards ===
The TIFF Tribute Awards, the festival's program of honouring film personnel for their overall achievements in cinema, were presented early during the festival run.

Spike Lee was announced as the recipient of the Ebert Director Award, and Pedro Almodóvar was announced as the recipient of the Jeffrey Skoll Award in Impact Media. Shawn Levy was announced as the recipient of the inaugural Norman Jewison Award for career achievement. Performer awards were presented to Colman Domingo and Vicky Krieps; Patricia Arquette was the recipient of the Share Her Journey Groundbreaker Award.

Polish cinematographer Łukasz Żal was the recipient of the Variety Artisan Award, Brazilian film director Carolina Markowicz was presented with the Emerging Talent Award, and Hong Kong actor and singer Andy Lau received a Special Tribute award.

=== Regular awards ===
Award	Film	Director
People's Choice Award	American Fiction	Cord Jefferson
People's Choice Award, First Runner Up	The Holdovers	Alexander Payne
People's Choice Award, Second Runner Up	The Boy and the Heron	Hayao Miyazaki
People's Choice Award: Documentaries	Mr. Dressup: The Magic of Make-Believe	Robert McCallum
Documentary, First Runner Up	Summer Qamp	Jen Markowitz
Documentary, Second Runner Up	Mountain Queen: The Summits of Lhakpa Sherpa	Lucy Walker
People's Choice Award: Midnight Madness	Dicks: The Musical	Larry Charles
Midnight Madness, First Runner Up	KILL	Nikhil Nagesh Bhat
Midnight Madness, Second Runner Up	Hell of a Summer	Finn Wolfhard, Billy Bryk
Platform Prize	Dear Jassi	Tarsem Singh
Best Canadian Feature Film	Solo	Sophie Dupuis
Best Canadian Feature Film, Honorable Mention	Kanaval	Henri Pardo
Best Canadian Short Film	Motherland	Jasmin Mozaffari
Best International Short Film	Electra	Daria Kashcheeva
FIPRESCI Award	Seagrass	Meredith Hama-Brown
NETPAC Award	A Match (Sthal)	Jayant Digambar Somalkar
NETPAC Award, Honorable Mention	Mimang	Kim Taeyang
Amplify Voices, Best Film	Kanaval	Henri Pardo
Amplify Voices, Best First Film	Tautuktavuk (What We See)	Carol Kunnuk, Lucy Tulugarjuk
Amplify Voices, Trailblazer	Damon D'Oliveira	
Changemaker Award	We Grown Now	Minhal Baig
Share Her Journey	Shé (Snake)	Renee Zhan
Share Her Journey, Honorable Mention	Gaby's Hills (Gaby les collines)	Zoé Pelchat

== Programme ==
=== Gala Presentations ===
The following films were selected to the Gala Presentations section:

English title	Original title	Director(s)	Production country
The Boy and the Heron (opening film)	君たちはどう生きるか	Hayao Miyazaki	Japan
Concrete Utopia	콘크리트 유토피아	Um Tae-hwa	South Korea
Dumb Money		Craig Gillespie	United States
The End We Start From		Mahalia Belo	United Kingdom
Fair Play		Chloe Domont	United States
Finestkind		Brian Helgeland	United States
Flora and Son		John Carney	Ireland, United States
Hate to Love: Nickelback		Leigh Brooks	Canada
Lee		Ellen Kuras	United Kingdom, United States
Lil Nas X: Long Live Montero		Carlos López Estrada, Zac Manuel	United States
The Movie Emperor	红毯先生	Ning Hao	China
The New Boy		Warwick Thornton	Australia
A Normal Family	보통의 가족	Hur Jin-ho	South Korea
Nyad		Elizabeth Chai Vasarhelyi, Jimmy Chin	United States
Origin		Ava DuVernay	United States
The Royal Hotel		Kitty Green	Australia, United Kingdom
Sly		Thom Zimny	United States
Smugglers	밀수	Ryoo Seung-wan	South Korea
Solo		Sophie Dupuis	Canada
Swan Song		Chelsea McMullan	Canada
Thank You for Coming		Karan Boolani	India

=== Special Presentations ===
The following films were selected to the Special Presentations section:

English title	Original title	Director(s)	Production country
American Fiction		Cord Jefferson	United States
Anatomy of a Fall	Anatomie d'une chute	Justine Triet	France
The Beast	La Bête	Bertrand Bonello	France, Canada
The Burial		Maggie Betts	United States
La chimera		Alice Rohrwacher	Italy, France, Switzerland
Close to You		Dominic Savage	Canada, United Kingdom
The Convert		Lee Tamahori	Australia, New Zealand
The Critic		Anand Tucker	United Kingdom
Daddio		Christy Hall	United States
Days of Happiness	Les Jours heureux	Chloé Robichaud	Canada
The Dead Don't Hurt		Viggo Mortensen	Canada, Mexico, Denmark
A Difficult Year	Une année difficile	Éric Toledano and Olivier Nakache	France
Evil Does Not Exist	悪は存在しない	Ryûsuke Hamaguchi	Japan
Ezra		Tony Goldwyn	United States
Fingernails		Christos Nikou	United States
Four Daughters	بنات ألفة	Kaouther Ben Hania	France, Tunisia, Germany, Saudi Arabia
His Three Daughters		Azazel Jacobs	United States
Hit Man		Richard Linklater	United States
The Holdovers		Alexander Payne	United States
In Restless Dreams: The Music of Paul Simon		Alex Gibney	United States
Les Indésirables		Ladj Ly	France
Kidnapped	Rapito	Marco Bellocchio	Italy, France, Germany
Knox Goes Away		Michael Keaton	United States
Last Summer	L'Été dernier	Catherine Breillat	France
Memory		Michel Franco	United States, Mexico
Monster	怪物	Hirokazu Kore-eda	Japan
Mother, Couch		Niclas Larsson	United States
The Movie Teller	La contadora de películas	Lone Scherfig	Spain, France, Chile
Next Goal Wins		Taika Waititi	United Kingdom, United States
North Star		Kristin Scott Thomas	United Kingdom
One Life		James Hawes	United Kingdom
Pain Hustlers		David Yates	United States
The Peasants		DK Welchman, Hugh Welchman	Poland, Serbia, Lithuania
Poolman		Chris Pine	United States
The Promised Land	Bastarden	Nikolaj Arcel	Denmark, Germany, Sweden
Quiz Lady		Jessica Yu	United States
Reptile		Grant Singer	United States
The Rescue: The Weight of the World	El Rapto	Daniela Goggi	Argentina
Ru		Charles-Olivier Michaud	Canada
Rustin		George C. Wolfe	United States
Seven Veils		Atom Egoyan	Canada
Shoshana		Michael Winterbottom	United Kingdom, Italy
Sing Sing		Greg Kwedar	United States
Stop Making Sense		Jonathan Demme	United States
The Taste of Christmas	El Sabor de la Navidad	Alejandro Lozano	Mexico
Together 99	Tillsammans 99	Lukas Moodysson	Sweden, Denmark
Unicorns		Sally El Hosaini, James Krishna Floyd	United Kingdom, United States, Sweden
Uproar		Paul Middleditch, Hamish Bennett	New Zealand
Wicked Little Letters		Thea Sharrock	United Kingdom
Wildcat		Ethan Hawke	United States
Woman of the Hour		Anna Kendrick	United States
The Zone of Interest		Jonathan Glazer	United Kingdom, Poland, United States

=== Centrepiece ===
English title	Original title	Director(s)	Production country
100 Yards		Xu Haofeng, Xu Junfeng	China
About Dry Grasses	Kuru Otlar Üstüne	Nuri Bilge Ceylan	Turkey, France, Germany, Sweden
Banel & Adama	Banel et Adama	Ramata-Toulaye Sy	France, Senegal, Mali
The Breaking Ice		Anthony Chen	China
Chuck Chuck Baby		Janis Pugh	United Kingdom
City of Wind	сэр сэр салхи	Lkhagvadulam Purev-Ochir	France, Mongolia, Portugal, Netherlands, Qatar, Germany
Close Your Eyes	Cerrar los ojos	Víctor Erice	Spain, Argentina
Death of a Whistleblower		Ian Gabriel	South Africa
The Delinquents	Los delincuentes	Rodrigo Moreno	Argentina, Brazil, Luxembourg, Chile
Fallen Leaves	Kuolleet lehdet	Aki Kaurismäki	Finland, Germany
The Feeling That the Time for Doing Something Has Passed		Joanna Arnow	United States
Fitting In		Molly McGlynn	Canada
Green Border	Zielona granica	Agnieszka Holland	Poland, Czech Republic, France, Belgium
A Happy Day		Hisham Zaman	Norway, Denmark
Hey, Viktor!		Cody Lightning	Canada
Holiday		Edoardo Gabbriellini	Italy
Humanist Vampire Seeking Consenting Suicidal Person	Vampire humaniste cherche suicidaire consentant	Ariane Louis-Seize	Canada
I Do Not Come To You By Chance		Ishaya Bako	Nigeria
In Flames		Zarrar Kahn	Canada, Pakistan
Inshallah a Boy	Inshallah Walad	Amjad Al Rasheed	Jordan, France, Saudi Arabia, Qatar, Egypt
Irena's Vow		Louise Archambault	Canada, Poland
Je’vida		Katja Gauriloff	Finland
Kanaval		Henri Pardo	Canada, Luxembourg
Limbo		Ivan Sen	Australia
Lost Ladies	Laapata Ladies	Kiran Rao	India
The Monk and the Gun		Pawo Choyning Dorji	Bhutan, France, United States, Taiwan
Mountains		Monica Sorelle	United States
National Anthem		Luke Gilford	United States
The Nature of Love	Simple comme Sylvain	Monia Chokri	Canada, France
Perfect Days		Wim Wenders	Japan
A Ravaging Wind	El Viento Que Arrasa	Paula Hernández	Argentina, Uruguay
The Reeds	Son Hasat	Cemil Ağacıkoğlu	Turkey, Bulgaria
A Road to a Village	गाउ आएको बाटो	Nabin Subba	Nepal
Robot Dreams		Pablo Berger	Spain, France
The Settlers	Los Colonos	Felipe Gálvez Haberle	Chile, Argentina, France, Denmark, United Kingdom, Taiwan, Sweden, Germany
Shadow of Fire	Hokage	Shinya Tsukamoto	Japan
Shayda		Noora Niasari	Australia
Sira		Apolline Traoré	Burkina Faso, Senegal, France, Germany
Snow Leopard	Xue Bao	Pema Tseden	China
Sweet Dreams		Ena Sendijarević	Netherlands, Sweden, Indonesia, France
The Teachers' Lounge	Das Lehrerzimmer	Ilker Çatak	Germany
They Shot the Piano Player	Dispararon al pianista	Fernando Trueba, Javier Mariscal	Spain, France, Netherlands
Toll	Pedágio	Carolina Markowicz	Brazil, Portugal
Upon Open Sky	A Cielo Abierto	Mariana Arriaga, Santiago Arriaga	Mexico, Spain
We Grown Now		Minhal Baig	United States
Woodland	Wald	Elisabeth Scharang	Austria
Your Mother's Son	Anak Ka Ng Ina Mo	Jun Lana	Philippines

=== TIFF Docs ===
The following films were selected to the TIFF Docs section:

English title	Original title	Director(s)	Production country
Boil Alert		Stevie Salas, James Burns	Canada
Bye Bye Tiberias	Bye Bye Tibériade	Lina Soualem	France, Belgium, Qatar, Palestine
The Contestant		Clair Titley	United Kingdom
Copa 71		Rachel Ramsay, James Erskine	United Kingdom
Defiant		Karim Amer	Ukraine, United Kingdom, United States
Flipside		Chris Wilcha	United States
God Is a Woman	Dieu est une femme	Andrés Peyrot	France, Switzerland, Panama
Homecoming	Máhccan	Suvi West, Anssi Kömi	Finland, Norway
I Am Sirat		Deepa Mehta, Sirat Taneja	Canada
In the Rearview	Skąd dokąd	Maciek Hamela	Poland, France, Ukraine
Menus-Plaisirs – Les Troisgros		Frederick Wiseman	France, United States
The Mother of All Lies	Kadib Abyad	Asmae El Moudir	Morocco, Egypt, Saudi Arabia, Qatar
Mountain Queen: The Summits of Lhakpa Sherpa		Lucy Walker	United States
Mr. Dressup: The Magic of Make-Believe		Robert McCallum	Canada
The Pigeon Tunnel		Errol Morris	United Kingdom, United States, Hungary
Silver Dollar Road		Raoul Peck	United States
Songs of Earth	Fedrelandet	Margreth Olin	Norway
Sorry/Not Sorry		Caroline Suh, Cara Mones	United States
Stamped from the Beginning		Roger Ross Williams	United States
Summer Qamp		Jen Markowitz	Canada
Viva Varda!		Pierre-Henri Gibert	France
The World Is Family	वसुधैव कूटुम्बकम	Anand Patwardhan	India
Walls	Mur	Kasia Smutniak	Italy

=== Discovery ===
English title	Original title	Director(s)	Production country
Achilles	آشیل	Farhad Delaram	Iran, Germany, France
After the Fire	Avant que les flammes ne s'éteignent	Mehdi Fikri	France
Andragogy	Budi Pekerti	Wregas Bhanuteja	Indonesia, Singapore
Arthur & Diana		Sara Summa	Germany
Backspot		D. W. Waterson	Canada
An Endless Sunday	Una Sterminata Domenica	Alain Parroni	Italy, Germany, Ireland
Frybread Face and Me		Billy Luther	United States
Gonzo Girl		Patricia Arquette	United States
Hajjan	هجان	Abu Bakr Shawky	Saudi Arabia, Egypt, Jordan
How to Have Sex		Molly Manning Walker	United Kingdom
I Don't Know Who You Are		M. H. Murray	Canada
La Suprema		Felipe Holguín Caro	Colombia
Mandoob	مندوب الليل	Ali Kalthami	Saudi Arabia
A Match	Sthal	Jayant Digambar Somalkar	India
Mimang	미망	Kim Taeyang	South Korea
The Queen of My Dreams		Fawzia Mirza	Canada
Seagrass		Meredith Hama-Brown	Canada
Solitude	Einvera	Ninna Pálmadóttir	Iceland, Slovakia, France
Tautuktavuk (What We See)		Carol Kunnuk, Lucy Tulugarjuk	Canada
The Teacher		Farah Nabulsi	United Kingdom, Palestine, Qatar
The Tundra Within Me	Eallogierdu	Sara Margrethe Oskal	Norway
Valentina or the Serenity	Valentina o la serenidad	Ángeles Cruz	Mexico
Widow Clicquot		Thomas Napper	France, United Kingdom
Wild Woman	La Mujer Salvaje	Alán González	Cuba
Without Air	Elfogy a levegő	Katalin Moldovai	Hungary
Yellow Bus		Wendy Bednarz	United Arab Emirates

=== Platform ===
The Platform Prize jury consisted of Barry Jenkins, Nadine Labaki and Anthony Shim.

English title	Original title	Director(s)	Production country
Dear Jassi		Tarsem Singh	India
Dream Scenario		Kristoffer Borgli	United States
Great Absence		Kei Chika-ura	Japan
I Told You So	Te l’avevo detto	Ginevra Elkann	Italy
The King Tide		Christian Sparkes	Canada
Not a Word	Kein Wort	Hanna Slak	Germany, Slovenia, France
The Rye Horn	O Corno	Jaione Camborda	Spain, Belgium, Portugal
Sisterhood	HLM Pussy	Nora El Hourch	France
Shame on Dry Land	Syndabocken	Axel Petersén	Sweden, Malta
Spirit of Ecstasy	La Vénus d’argent	Héléna Klotz	France

=== Midnight Madness ===
English title	Original title	Director(s)	Production country
Aggro Dr1ft		Harmony Korine	United States
Boy Kills World		Moritz Mohr	Germany, South Africa, United States
Dicks: The Musical (opening film)		Larry Charles	United States
Hell of a Summer		Finn Wolfhard, Billy Bryk	United States, Canada
KILL		Nikhil Nagesh Bhat	India
NAGA	ناقة	Meshal Aljaser	Saudi Arabia
Riddle of Fire (closing film)		Weston Razooli	United States
Sleep	잠	Jason Yu	South Korea
When Evil Lurks	Cuando Acecha la Maldad	Demián Rugna	Argentina
Working Class Goes to Hell	Radnička klasa ide u pakao	Mladen Đorđević	Serbia, Greece, Bulgaria, Montenegro, Croatia, Romania

=== Primetime ===
English title	Original title	Director(s)	Production country
Alice & Jack		Victor Levin, Juho Kuosmanen, Hong Khaou	United Kingdom
All the Light We Cannot See		Shawn Levy, Steven Knight	United States
Bad Boy		Hagar Ben-Asher, Ron Leshem, Daniel Chen, Roee Florentin, Moshe Malka, Amit Cohen, Daniel Amsel	Israel
Bargain		Byun Seung-min, Jeon Woo-sung	South Korea
Black Life: Untold Stories		Leslie Norville	Canada
Bria Mack Gets a Life		Sasha Leigh Henry	Canada
Estonia		Miikko Oikkonen	Finland, Sweden, Belgium, Estonia
Expats		Lulu Wang	United States
Telling Our Story		Kim O'Bomsawin	Canada

=== Short Cuts ===
English title	Original title	Director(s)	Production country
6 Minutes per Kilometre	6 minutes/km	Catherine Boivin	Canada
27		Flóra Anna Buda	France, Hungary
1001 Nights	1001 noć	Rea Rajčić	Croatia
Aftercare		Anubha Momin	Canada
Alberto and the Beast		John Paul Lopez-Ali	United States
All the Days of May	Tous les jours de mai	Miryam Charles	Canada
Aphasia	Aphasie	Marielle Dalpé	Canada
Been There		Corina Schwingruber Ilić	Switzerland
Bird	Ave	Ana Cristina Barragán	Ecuador, Spain
A Bird Called Memory	Pássaro Memória	Leonardo Martinelli	Brazil, United Kingdom
Bloom		Kasey Lum	Canada
DAMMI		Yann Mounir Demange	France
Electra		Daria Kashcheeva	Czech Republic, France, Slovakia
Ever Since, I Have Been Flying	O Gündür Bu Gündür, Uçuyorum	Aylin Gökmen	Switzerland
Express		Ivan D. Ossa	Canada
Fár		Gunnur Martinsdóttir Schlüter	Iceland
Gaby's Hills	Gaby les collines	Zoé Pelchat	Canada
The Heart		Malia Ann	United States
Human Resources	Ressources humaines	Trinidad Plass Caussade, Titouan Tillier, Isaac Wenzek	France
I Used to Live There		Ryan McKenna	Canada
Lake Baikal	Baigal Nuur	Alisi Telengut	Canada
Making Babies	Faire un enfant	Eric K. Boulianne	Canada
Mboa Matanda		Jules Kalla Eyango	Cameroon
Meteor		Atefeh Khademolreza	Canada
Modern Goose		Karsten Wall	Canada
Motherland	سرزمین مادری	Jasmin Mozaffari	Canada
Mothers and Monsters		Édith Jorisch	Canada
Nada de todo esto		Francisco Cantón, Patricio Martínez	Argentina, Spain, United States
Nun or Never!		Heta Jäälinoja	Finland
The Passing		Ivete Lucas, Patrick Xavier Bresnan	United States
La Perra		Carla Melo Gampert	Colombia, France
Primetime Mother		Sonny Calvento	Philippines, Singapore
Redlights		Eva Thomas	Canada
Sawo Matang		Andrea Nirmala Widjajanto	Canada, Indonesia, United States
Shé (Snake)		Renee Zhan	United Kingdom
Sheephead		Spencer Creigh	United States
The Skates	Les Patins	Halima Ouardiri	Canada
This Is Not About Swimming		Marni Van Dyk	Canada
This Is TMI		Subarna Dash, Vidushi Gupta	India
Titanic, Suitable Version for Iranian Families	Titanic, noskhe monaseb baraye khanevadehaye irani	Farnoosh Samadi	Iran, France
WOACA		Mackenzie Davis	United Kingdom
Xie Xie, Ollie		James Michael Chiang	Canada

=== Wavelengths ===
English title	Original title	Director(s)	Production country
Bouquets 31-40		Rose Lowder	France
Chantal Akerman: Her First Look Behind the Camera		Chantal Akerman	Belgium
The Daughters of Fire	As Filhas do Fogo	Pedro Costa	Portugal
Do Not Expect Too Much from the End of the World	Nu astepta prea mult de la sfârsitul lumii	Radu Jude	Romania
Film Sculpture (1-4)		Philipp Fleischmann	Austria
He Thought He Died		Isiah Medina	Canada
Here		Bas Devos	Belgium
The Human Surge 3	El Auge del Humano 3	Eduardo Williams	Argentina, Portugal, Brazil, Netherlands, Taiwan, Hong Kong, Sri Lanka, Peru
Inside the Yellow Cocoon Shell	Bên trong vỏ kén vàng	Phạm Thiên Ân	Vietnam, Singapore, France, Spain
It follows It passes on		Erica Sheu	Taiwan, United States
Laberint Sequences		Blake Williams	Canada
Let's Talk		Simon Liu	Hong Kong
Light, Noise, Smoke, and Light, Noise, Smoke		Tomonari Nishikawa	Japan
Mademoiselle Kenopsia		Denis Côté	Canada
Mambar Pierrette		Rosine Mbakam	Belgium, Cameroon
Mast-del		Maryam Tafakory	United Kingdom, Iran
Music		Angela Schanelec	Germany, France, Serbia
Nowhere Near		Miko Revereza	Philippines
NYC RGB		Viktoria Schmid	Austria, United States
Orlando, My Political Biography	Orlando, ma biographie politique	Paul B. Preciado	France
Pictures of Ghosts	Retratos Fantasmas	Kleber Mendonça Filho	Brazil
Quiet As It's Kept		Ja'Tovia Gary	United States
Shrooms		Jorge Jácome	Portugal
Slow Shift		Shambhavi Kaul	India, United States
Sundown		Steve Reinke	United States, Canada, Austria
Trailer of the Film That Will Never Exist: "Phony Wars"	Film annonce du film qui n’existera jamais: Drôles de guerres	Jean-Luc Godard	France, Switzerland
We Don't Talk Like We Used To		Joshua Gen Solondz	United States, Japan, Hong Kong
Youth (Spring)	青春	Wang Bing	China, France, Luxembourg, Netherlands

=== TIFF Classics ===
English title	Original title	Director(s)	Production country
L'Amour fou (1969)		Jacques Rivette	France
Artie Shaw: Time Is All You've Got (1985)		Brigitte Berman	Canada
Farewell My Concubine (1993)	霸王別姬	Chen Kaige	China, Hong Kong
Touki Bouki (1973)		Djibril Diop Mambéty	Senegal
Xala (1975)		Ousmane Sembène	Senegal

=== Industry Selects ===
Films that were screened for film buyers and all industry professionals at the festival, but not open to the general public:

English title	Original title	Director(s)	Production country
Amelia’s Children		Gabriel Abrantes	Portugal
Bonus Track		Julia Jackman	United Kingdom
Borderline		Jimmy Warden	United States
The Boy in the Woods		Rebecca Snow	Canada
Dance First		James Marsh	United Kingdom
The Home		James DeMonaco	United States
Inheritance		Neil Burger	United States, United Kingdom, Egypt, India
My Mother's Men	Les Hommes de ma mère	Anik Jean	Canada
Orah		Lonzo Nzekwe	Canada
Queen of Bones		Robert Budreau	Canada, United States
Umbrella Men II: Escape from Robben Island		John Barker	South Africa
Vera and the Pleasure of Others	Vera y el placer de los otros	Romina Tamburello, Federic Actis	Argentina

=== Festival Street ===
Older films, usually with some sort of connection to a film screening as part of the main program, shown at David Pecaut Square as part of TIFF's Festival Street event.

English title	Original title	Director(s)	Production country
Addams Family Values (1993)		Barry Sonnenfeld	United States
Batman (1989)		Tim Burton	United States
Clueless (1995)		Amy Heckerling	United States
Contact (1997)		Robert Zemeckis	United States
Hunt for the Wilderpeople (2016)		Taika Waititi	New Zealand
Pee-Wee's Big Adventure (1985)		Tim Burton	United States
Rocky (1975)		John G. Avildsen	United States
Superman III (1983)		Richard Lester	United States
The Spiderwick Chronicles (2008)		Mark Waters	United States
Where the Wild Things Are (2009)		Spike Jonze	United States

== Canada's Top Ten ==
TIFF's annual Canada's Top Ten list of the ten best Canadian feature and short films of the year was released on December 6, 2023.

=== Feature films ===
- BlackBerry — Matt Johnson
- Hey, Viktor! — Cody Lightning
- Humanist Vampire Seeking Consenting Suicidal Person (Vampire humaniste cherche suicidaire consentant) — Ariane Louis-Seize
- Kanaval — Henri Pardo
- The Queen of My Dreams — Fawzia Mirza
- Seagrass — Meredith Hama-Brown
- Seven Veils — Atom Egoyan
- Solo — Sophie Dupuis
- Someone Lives Here — Zack Russell
- Tautuktavuk (What We See) — Carol Kunnuk, Lucy Tulugarjuk

=== Short films ===
- Gaby's Hills (Gaby les collines) — Zoé Pelchat
- I Used to Live There — Ryan McKenna
- Katshinau — Julien G. Marcotte, Jani Bellefleur-Kaltush
- Lake Baikal (Baigal Nuur) — Alisi Telengut
- Madeleine — Raquel Sancinetti
- Making Babies (Faire un enfant) — Eric K. Boulianne
- Motherland — Jasmin Mozaffari
- Mothers and Monsters — Édith Jorisch
- Sawo Matang — Andrea Nirmala Widjajanto
- Thriving: A Dissociated Reverie — Nicole Bazuin
