= Coven (disambiguation) =

A coven is a gathering of witches.

Coven may also refer to:

- Coven (band), an American rock band
- Coven (1997 film), an American short horror film
- Coven (2020 film), a Spanish drama film
- Coven (2023 film), a Canadian documentary film
- The Coven (film), a 2015 UK horror film
- American Horror Story: Coven, the third season of the US television series American Horror Story
- Coven, Staffordshire, UK

== See also ==
- Covan, Adrian Kowanek (born 1977), Polish death-metal vocalist
