= Mountains (2023 film) =

2023 American drama film

- Theatrical release poster
- Directed by: Monica Sorelle
- Written by: Monica Sorelle; Robert Colom
- Produced by: Robert Colom
- Starring: Atibon Nazaire; Sheila Anozier; Chris Renois
- Cinematography: Javier Labrador Deulofeu
- Edited by: Jonathan Cuartas
- Music by: Dyani Douze
- Production companies: Filmes Conéme; Neon Heart Productions; Oolite Arts; Level Forward; Frame Hound
- Distributed by: Music Box Films
- Release dates: June 9, 2023 (Tribeca); September 14, 2023 (TIFF); August 16, 2024 (United States)
- Running time: 95 minutes
- Country: United States
- Languages: Haitian Creole; English; Spanish
- Box office: $46,954

Mountains is a 2023 American drama film, directed by Monica Sorelle in her directorial debut, from a screenplay by Sorelle and Robert Colom. It stars Atibon Nazaire, Sheila Anozier, and Chris Renois.

Mountains had its world premiere at Tribeca Festival on June 9, 2023, and was released on August 16, 2024, by Music Box Films. The film was nominated for two Independent Spirit Awards, including Best Breakthrough Performance for Nazaire, and Someone to Watch for Sorelle, which she won.

== Premise ==
Xavier is a Haitian demolition worker living in Little Haiti, Miami with his wife, Esperance, and college dropout son, Junior. While pursuing a new house for the family, he is faced with the realities of redevelopment as he is tasked with dismantling his rapidly gentrifying neighborhood.

== Cast ==
- Atibon Nazaire as Xavier
- Sheila Anozier as Esperance
- Chris Renois as Junior
- Kerline Alce as Magaly
- Karina Bonnefil as Angeline
- Yaniel Castillo as Chino
- Serafin Falcon as Jorge
- Farley Louis as Farrell
- Macc Plaise as Jimmy
- Bechir Sylvain as Dominique
- Roscoè B. Thické III as Daniel

== Release ==
The film had its world premiere at the Tribeca Festival on June 9, 2023, where it received a Special Jury Mention for US Narrative Feature. It went onto screen at the BlackStar Film Festival on August 6, 2023, 2023 Toronto International Film Festival on September 8, 2023, and AFI Fest on October 27, 2023. In June 2024, Music Box Films acquired US distribution rights to the film, and set it for an August 16, 2024 release at Coral Gables Art Cinema, with an August 23, 2024 expansion.

== Reception ==
On the review aggregator website Rotten Tomatoes, 97% of 34 critics' reviews are positive, with an average rating of 8.30/10. The website's consensus reads: "A beautifully acted and observant portrait of a family and their community, Mountains marks an impressive debut by director Monica Sorelle." Metacritic, which uses a weighted average, assigned the film a score of 81 out of 100, based on 14 critics, indicating "universal acclaim".

In his Critic's Pick review for Indiewire, Christian Blauvelt gave Mountains an “A” and hailed it as one of 2024’s “best debut features.” Angelica Jade Bastién of Vulture called Mountains “a quietly magnificent debut,” and described it as “a vibrant story of gentrification and generational divides in Miami’s Little Haiti, brought to life by tremendous performances.” John Fink of The Film Stage observed that the film “frames the disappearance of Miami’s Little Haiti with a warm, compassionate gaze recalling the masters of social realism – akin to Roberto Rossellini with the touch of Ousmane Sembène’s lighter films.” Erick Massoto of Collider described Mountains as "a powerful character study and a great debut for Monica Sorelle that marks her as one to watch."

IndieWire included Mountains on its list of "The 17 Best First Feature Films of 2024.”

=== Accolades ===
Award	Date of ceremony	Category	Recipient(s)	Result	Ref.
Tribeca Festival	June 15, 2023	Founders Award for Best U.S. Narrative Feature	Mountains	Nominated	
Tribeca Festival	June 15, 2023	U.S. Narrative Feature Special Jury Mention	Mountains	Won	
BlackStar Film Festival	August 7, 2023	Jury Award for Best Feature Narrative	Mountains	Nominated	
BlackStar Film Festival	August 7, 2023	Audience Award for Best Feature Narrative	Mountains	Won	
Charlotte Film Festival	October 9, 2023	Best Narrative Feature	Mountains	Won	
New Hampshire Film Festival	October 15, 2023	Grand Jury Award, Narrative	Mountains	Won	
Indie Memphis Film Festival	October 29, 2023	Best Narrative Feature	Mountains	Won	
Film Fest Knox	November 12, 2023	American Regional Competition Jury Prize	Mountains	Won	
New Orleans Film Festival	November 17, 2023	Audience Award for Narrative Feature	Mountains	Won	
Film Independent Spirit Awards	February 25, 2024	Best Breakthrough Performance	Atibon Nazaire	Nominated	
Film Independent Spirit Awards	February 25, 2024	Someone to Watch Award	Monica Sorelle	Won	
Miami Film Festival	April 13, 2024	Made in MIA Feature Film Award	Mountains	Won	
Florida Film Festival	April 22, 2024	Audience Award for Best Florida Feature	Mountains	Won	
Seattle International Film Festival	May 19, 2024	New American Cinema Competition	Mountains	Nominated	
Florida Film Critics Circle	December 20, 2024	Golden Orange	Mountains	Won	
