= Monica Sorelle =

Haitian-American filmmaker and artist

- Born: Miami, Florida, US
- Occupations: Filmmaker; producer; artist
- Works: Mountains (2023)
- Awards: United States Artists Fellowship (2026); Film Independent Spirit Awards - Someone to Watch Award (2024)

Monica Sorelle is a Haitian-American filmmaker and visual artist based in Miami.

== Early life and education ==
Sorelle was born and raised in North Miami, Florida to Haitian parents.

She started taking film classes at 16, and attended Miami Dade College and University of Central Florida, where she received a Bachelor of Fine Arts in Film in 2012.

== Career ==
Sorelle produced a number of short films that have been awarded at festivals such as Berlinale, BlackStar Film Festival and Miami Film Festival, and acquired by Criterion Channel and Indiana University Bloomington Black Film Center & Archive.

She was awarded the Artist Fellowship from the Caribbean Cultural Institute at Pérez Art Museum Miami in 2021. In 2023, her video work was exhibited on PAMM TV, Pérez Art Museum Miami's streaming service for video art. Sorelle is a 2023 Artists in Residence in Everglades (AIRIE) Fellow and recipient of the South Florida Cultural Consortium Fellowship. In 2026, she was named a United States Artists (USA) Fellow.

Sorelle co-wrote and directed her feature film debut, Mountains (2023), about the impact of gentrification in Miami's Little Haiti through the lens of a Haitian demolition worker and his family. Mountains had its world premiere at the 2023 Tribeca Film Festival, where it received a Special Jury Mention in the U.S. Narrative competition, and its international premiere in the Centrepiece program at the 2023 Toronto International Film Festival. Mountains received several festival awards, including Miami Film Festival’s Made in MIA award. Sorelle won the Someone to Watch Award at the 39th Film Independent Spirit Awards. The film was released theatrically in the United States in 2024.
