= Soleil Launière =

Performing artist in Canada

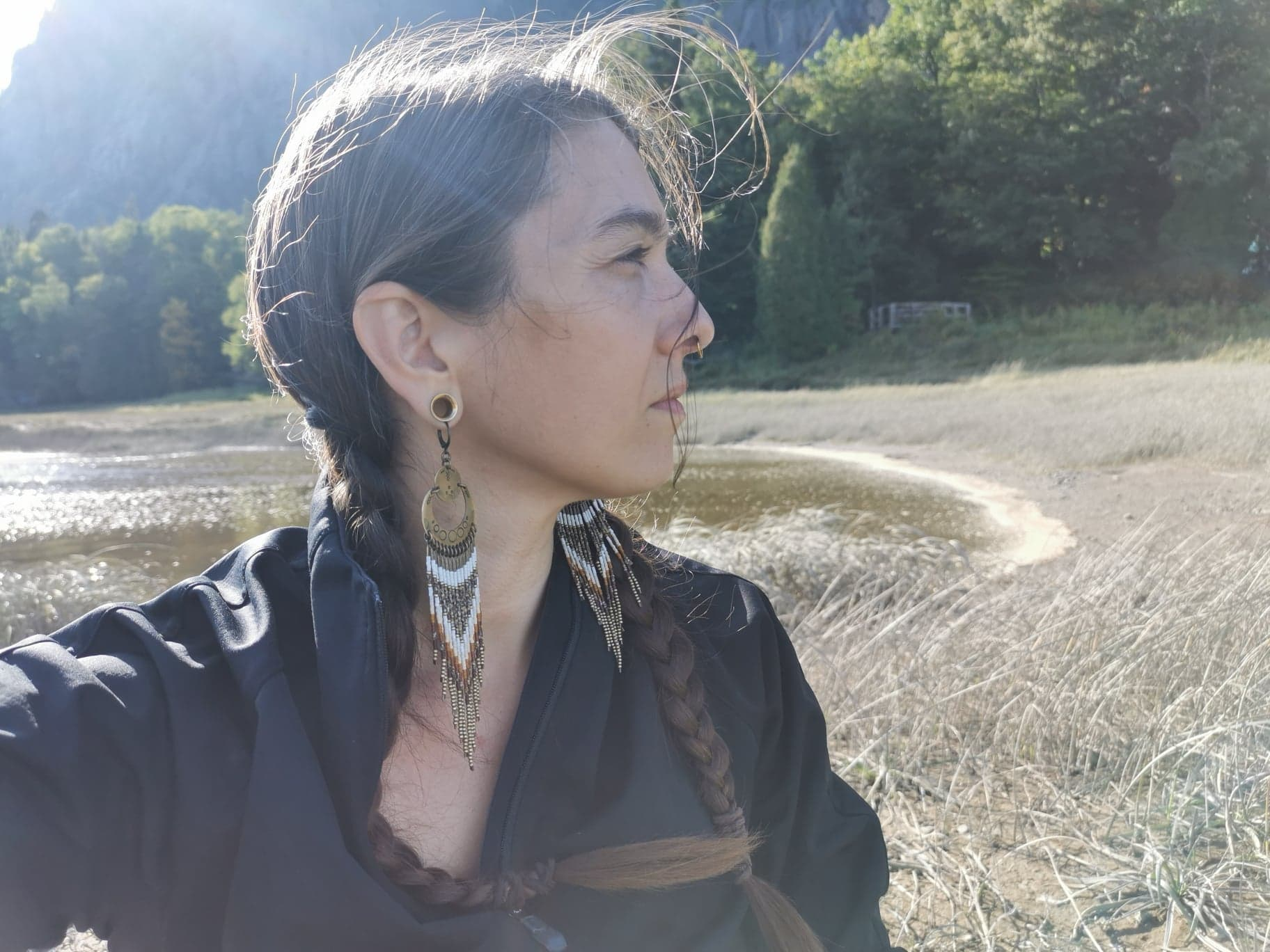
Image of Soleil Launiere

Soleil Launière is an Innu writer, actress, performance artist and musician from Canada, who was the first Indigenous Canadian artist ever to win the Francouvertes competition for emerging musicians from Quebec.

A member of the Pekuakamiulnuatsh First Nation from Mashteuiatsh, Quebec, she is the daughter of an Innu father and a québécoise mother, and her work is often themed in part on her status as an indigenous woman who can often pass for white. She launched the production company Auen Productions in 2019 to produce theatrical and performance work.

Her stage play Akuteu was a Governor General's Award nominee for French-language drama at the 2023 Governor General's Awards. It won the Indigenous Voices Award for French Poetry or Drama, and the awards for Poetry/Drama and Discovery at the 2024 Salon du livre du Saguenay-Lac-Saint-Jean.

In 2023 she released the album Taueu, which features songs performed in English, French and Innu-aimun. In addition to her victory at the Francouvertes, she received Félix Award nominations for Indigenous Artist of the Year and Indigenous Language Album of the Year at the 46th Félix Awards in 2024. In the same year, she acted in the short film Katshinau (Les Mains sales).

She identifies as two-spirit.
