= Josée Deschênes =

Canadian actress

Josée Deschênes (born August 9, 1961 in Jonquière (now Saguenay, Quebec)) is a Canadian actress from Quebec. She is best known for her performance in Polygraph, for which she received a nomination for Best Supporting Actress at the 17th Genie Awards in 1996, and Ghost Town Anthology (Répertoire des villes disparues), for which she was a Prix Iris nominee for Best Actress at the 21st Quebec Cinema Awards in 2019.

She also appeared in the films The Seat of the Soul (Le siège de l'âme), Love and Magnets (Les Aimants) and The Little Queen (La Petite Reine), and the television series Annie et ses hommes, La Petite Vie, L'Auberge du chien noir and Le Phoenix.
