= Shé (Snake) =

2023 British short film directed by Renee Zhan

- Directed by: Renee Zhan
- Written by: Renee Zhan
- Produced by: Jesse Romain
- Starring: Xiaonan Wang
- Cinematography: Adam Singodia
- Edited by: Armiliah Aripin
- Music by: Harry Brokensha
- Production companies: A Minor; National Film and Television School
- Distributed by: BBC Film
- Release date: 8 September 2023 (TIFF)
- Running time: 15 minutes
- Country: United Kingdom
- Language: English

Shé (Snake) is a British short drama film, directed by Renee Zhan and released in 2023. The film stars Xiaonan Wang as Fei, a violinist with a youth orchestra whose inner demons begin to externalize as physical monsters when a rival of comparable talent arrives to challenge her place.

The cast also includes Alina Lew, Simon Paisley Day, Elizabeth Chan, Leslie Ching and Grace Fan.

The film premiered at the 2023 Toronto International Film Festival, where it was named the winner of the Share Her Journey award.

It was subsequently announced to the lineups of the 2024 Sundance Film Festival, and the 2024 South by Southwest.

== Synopsis ==
Fei, a 16-year-old British-Chinese girl, is the top violinist in an elite youth orchestra. When another Chinese violinist arrives to challenge her place, Fei's anxieties and inner pressure due to internalized racism grow to take a monstrous physical form. They whisper to her, urging her to be the best, no matter the cost.
