= Simon Paisley Day =

British actor

- Born: 13 April 1967 (age 58); Gillingham, Kent, England
- Other names: Simon Day
- Occupation: Actor
- Children: 2

Simon Paisley Day (born 13 April 1967), also credited as Simon Day, is an English stage and screen actor.

== Early life ==
Paisley Day was born in Gillingham, Kent. He read Drama and American Literature at the University of East Anglia in Norwich, England. Afterwards, Paisley Day undertook training at Bristol Old Vic for two years before embarking on a career as an actor.

== Career ==
Paisley is a well-established theatre actor and has performed in plays such as The Taming of the Shrew, Hamlet, The Crucible and Troilus and Cressida. His television credits include Sherlock, Being Human, Midsomer Murders Doctor Who and Spartacus. His big-screen credits include The Eagle of the Ninth, The Queen of Sheba's Pearls and Churchill: The Hollywood Years.

His most recent work includes Timon of Athens (2008), Entertaining Mr Sloane (2009), Private Lives (2010), Twelfth Night (National Theatre, 2011), The Taming of the Shrew (Shakespeare's Globe, 2012) and portraying Sir Cosmo Duff Gordon in the 2012 ITV period drama Titanic.

== Personal life ==
Paisley Day lives in Whitstable, with his wife and two children.

== Film ==
Year	Title	Character	Production
2004	Churchill: The Hollywood Years	Larry	Little Bird
2004	The Queen of Sheba's Pearls	Headmaster Evans	AB Svensk Filmindustri
2007	Flawless	Boland	Future Films
2011	The Eagle	Surgeon	Focus Features
2011	The Painting	Man	Inclusive Media
2014	Pudsey the Dog: The Movie	Reverend Treeboys	Vertigo Films
2014	The Falling	Psychiatrist	Cannon and Morley Productions
2017	Victoria & Abdul	Mr. Tyler	BBC Films
2019	Brexit: The Uncivil War	Douglas Carswell	Channel 4 / HBO
2019	Star Wars: The Rise of Skywalker	General Domaric Quinn	Lucasfilm Ltd. and Bad Robot
2023	Shé (Snake)	Mr. Grimsby	A Minor, National Film and Television School
2025	Kesari Chapter 2	General Reginald Dyer	Dharma Productions; Cape of Good Films; Leo Media Collective

== Theatre ==
Year	Title	Character	Production	Director
2017	The Lorax by David Greig	The Once-ler	Royal Alexandra Theatre	Max Webster
2014	Urinetown by Mark Hollmann and Greg Kotis	Caldwell B. Cladwell	St. James Theatre, London	Jamie Lloyd
2013	The Low Road by Bruce Norris	Various	Royal Court Theatre	Dominic Cooke
2012	The Taming of the Shrew by William Shakespeare	Petruchio	Shakespeare's Globe	Toby Frow
2011	Twelfth Night by William Shakespeare	Malvolio	National Theatre	Sir Peter Hall
2010	Private Lives by Noël Coward	Victor	Vaudeville Theatre	Sir Richard Eyre
2009	Entertaining Mr Sloane by Joe Orton	Ed	Trafalgar Studios	Nick Bagnall
2008	Timon of Athens by William Shakespeare	Timon	The Globe	Lucy Bailey
2007	The Ugly One by Marius von Mayenburg	Scheffler	Royal Court Theatre	Ramin Gray
2007	Don't Look Now by Daphne Du Maurier	John	Sheffield Theatre and Lyric Hammersmith	Lucy Bailey
2007	The 39 Steps by John Buchan	Hannay	Criterion Theatre	Maria Aitken
2005	The Philanthropist by Christopher Hampton	Braham	Donmar Warehouse	David Grindley
2005	Cymbeline by William Shakespeare	Iachimo	Regent's Park Open Air Theatre	Rachel Kavanaugh
2005	Twelfth Night by William Shakespeare	Feste	Regent's Park Open Air Theatre	Timothy Sheader
2003	Love's Labour's Lost by William Shakespeare	King Ferdinand of Navarre	National Theatre	Sir Trevor Nunn
2003	Anything Goes by Cole Porter	Lord Evelyn Oakley	National Theatre	Sir Trevor Nunn
2002	The Coast of Utopia by Tom Stoppard	Nicholas Ogarev	National Theatre	Sir Trevor Nunn
2001	Hamlet by William Shakespeare	Horatio	National Theatre	John Caird
2000	Candide from the book by Voltaire	Maximilian	National Theatre	John Caird
1999	Troilus and Cressida by William Shakespeare	Ajax	National Theatre	Sir Trevor Nunn
1999	Money by Edward Bulwer-Lytton	Sir Frederick Blount	National Theatre	John Caird
1998	Oh! What A Lovely War by Joan Littlewood	Henry Wilson	National Theatre	Fiona Laird
1996	By Jeeves by Alan Ayckbourn	Gussie Fink-Nottle	Lyric Theatre	Sir Alan Ayckbourn
1992	A Woman of No Importance by Oscar Wilde	Lord Alfred	RSC	Philip Prowse

== TV ==
Year	Title	Character	Production	Notes
2022	This England	Dominic Cummings	Sky Atlantic	
2020	Alex Rider	Dr. Baxter	Netflix	
2020	Miracle Workers	King Trex	TBS	Season 2, episode 5: "Holiday"
2017	The Crown	Meryn Lewis	Netflix	
2015	Doctor Who	Rump	BBC	Episode: "Face the Raven"
2014	The Musketeers	Cluzet	BBC	Episode: "The Good Soldier"
2012	Titanic	Sir Cosmo Duff Gordon	ITV	Episode Two and Four
2012	Sherlock	Major Barrymore	BBC	Series 2, "The Hounds of Baskerville"
2011	Hustle	Consultant	BBC	Series 7, "The Fall of Railton FC"
2010	Being Human	Alan Cortez	BBC	Season 2, episode 6
2008	Midsomer Murders	Randall Colquhoun	ITV	Blood Wedding
2007	The Relief of Belsen	Major Stadler	Channel 4	TV movie
2006	The Catherine Tate Show	Mr Aga Saga	BBC	Season 3, episode 6
2006	Hotel Babylon	Mr Austin	BBC	Season 1, episode 1
2005	Space Race	Kammler	BBC	TV series documentary, Race to the Moon
2005	The Last Detective	Bald Man	ITV	Towpaths of Glory
2005	The Bill	Martin Glass	ITV	Season 21, episode 31
2005	Doctor Who	Steward	BBC	Episode: "The End of the World"
2004	Shane	Suicide Steve	ITV	Season 1, episode 6
2004	He Knew He Was Right	Sir Henry Woddis	BBC	
2004	Spartacus	Orsino	USA Network	TV movie
2002	Bertie and Elizabeth	Arthur Wood	ITV	TV movie
1995	Wycliffe	SOCCO	ITV	Lost Contact
1995	Pie in the Sky	Roger	BBC	Lemon Twist
1994	The Knock	Jeremy Pointon	ITV	Season 1, episode 6
1994	Peak Practice		ITV	Long Weekend
1994	The House of Eliott	Harry	BBC	Season 3, episode 2
1993	London's Burning		ITV	Season 6, episode 8
1992	Casualty	Heart surgeon	BBC	Body and Soul
1992	Red Dwarf	Cdr. Randy Navarro	BBC	Series 5, "Holoship"
