= When Love Digs a Hole =

2018 Quebec dark comedy film

- Theatrical release poster
- French: Quand l'amour se creuse un trou
- Directed by: Ara Ball
- Written by: Ara Ball
- Produced by: Kas Steets
- Starring: Robert Naylor; France Castel; Julie Le Breton; Patrice Robitaille
- Cinematography: Kas Steets
- Edited by: Ara Ball
- Music by: Robert Naylor
- Release date: June 15, 2018
- Running time: 89 minutes
- Country: Canada
- Language: French

When Love Digs a Hole (French: Quand l'amour se creuse un trou) is a 2018 Quebec black comedy film written and directed by Canadian director Ara Ball being his debut long feature film. It was launched on 15 June 2018 on Canadian screen in both French and English.

The scenario was written by Ball in 16 days while in Peru in the winter of 2017 and filmed it in locations mainly in Howick in the Montérégie region of Quebec, Canada. Miron, the film's young character does share some superficial traits with Ball's younger days (including a hairdo) and Ball says the film is a tribute to his own grandmother Margaret Ball as he was so close to her. The film also has some reference points to Hal Ashby's film Harold and Maude that his grandmother introduced him to when Ball was just 12.

== Plot ==
Miron, a young delinquent man (Robert Naylor) leads a party life in a 1990s Montreal and fails in school. His parents, David and Thérèse (Patrice Robitaille and Julie Le Breton), both university professors force their son to follow them to the countryside in the hope that the remoteness of the city's distractions will allow him to concentrate and eventually succeed in high school. Meanwhile, David and Thérèse have marital issues of their own with the rift widening between the two as the summer days progress.

After a week at the cottage, Miron meets Florence (France Castel), the 73-year-old neighbour. It's love at first sight between the two, with 55 years separating them. Various chores done by Miron develop eventually into a sexual relationship. And with a profound change in Miron emotional life comes also a big improvement in his home studies with the aid and supervision of his mother homeschooling him.

As the relationship between Miron and Florence deepens further, Miron's parents become very concerned with this love affair, so Miron's parents forbid their son from seeing Florence, including his father locking Miron in his room in an imposed night curfew. But determined to live his love story to the end, Miron makes every effort to see Florence again and starts digging a tunnel from his own room wall leading to Florence's home, and after many days of relentless labour, the tunnel digging is fruitful and Miron and Florence are able to meet in secret on a daily basis unbeknownst to Miron's parents whose personal rift is starting to patch up with a rekindled affinity between the two.

As the family's vacation is over and they have to return to Montreal, Miron helps his parents with their luggage and then escapes through the makeshift tunnel eloping with Florence.

== Cast ==
- Robert Naylor as Miron
- France Castel as Florence
- Julie Le Breton as Thérèse (Miron's mother)
- Patrice Robitaille as David (Miron's father)
- Rose-Marie Perreault as Sophie
- Emilie Carbonneau as young Florence
- Thomas Beaudoin as young husband of Florence
- Katia Lévesque as server
