= Ghost Town Anthology =

2019 film

- Film poster
- French: Répertoire des villes disparues
- Directed by: Denis Côté
- Written by: Denis Côté
- Based on: Répertoire des villes disparues by Laurence Olivier
- Produced by: Ziad Touma
- Starring: Robert Naylor; Josée Deschênes; Jean-Michel Anctil; Larissa Corriveau
- Cinematography: François Messier-Rheault
- Edited by: Nicolas Roy
- Production company: Couzin Films
- Release dates: 11 February 2019 (Berlin); 15 February 2019 (Canada)
- Running time: 97 minutes
- Country: Canada
- Language: French
- Budget: C$2.1 million

Ghost Town Anthology (French: Répertoire des villes disparues) is a 2019 French-language Canadian supernatural drama film written and directed by Denis Côté. Based on Laurence Olivier’s short novel of the same name, it follows a small Quebec village unsettled by a teenager’s death and strange apparitions. The film premiered at the Berlin International Film Festival, where it was selected for the Competition section and was a Golden Bear contender.

== Synopsis ==
Set in the small Quebec village of Irénée-les-Neiges, the film centres on a community after local teenager Simon Dubé dies in a car accident. As Simon’s family and the wider town are shaken by his death, residents begin to notice strange figures around the village.

== Cast ==
The cast includes:

- Robert Naylor as Jimmy Dubé
- Josée Deschênes as Gisèle Dubé
- Jean-Michel Anctil as Romuald Dubé
- Larissa Corriveau as Adèle
- Diane Lavallée as Simone Smallwood
- Rémi Goulet as André
- Jocelyne Zucco as Louise
- Normand Carrière as Richard
- Hubert Proulx as Pierre
- Rachel Graton as Camille

== Production ==
The film was produced by Couzin Films. It was Côté's first adaptation of a literary work, based on Laurence Olivier’s short novel of the same name. Filming took place over 26 days in February and March 2018 in Montérégie. The film had an approximate budget of C$2.1 million.

== Festival screenings ==
The film had its world premiere on 11 February 2019 at the Berlin International Film Festival, where it was selected for the Competition section and was a Golden Bear contender.

== Reception ==
=== Critical response ===
Jay Weissberg of Variety described Ghost Town Anthology as an intimate and unsettling film that “approaches narrative elliptically”. He wrote that Côté was less interested in resolving the film’s mysteries than in following the emotional effect of the questions they raise.

David Rooney of The Hollywood Reporter described the film as a “low-key mood piece” with enough ambiguity to hold interest, but found it “too subdued for genre fans” and “too psychologically thin” for more art-film-oriented audiences.

Geoff Andrew of Sight and Sound described the film as “a genuinely intriguing and for the most part rewarding study” of how an unexpected death affects a small, inward-looking rural community. He wrote that Côté does not take the story in the direction of a horror movie, instead focusing on how people cope with mortality, loss, and the possibility that the dead do not entirely disappear.

Wendy Ide of The Guardian described it as an “elegantly unnerving drama” in which supernatural visitations unsettle an insular rural community. She wrote that the film’s themes included hostility toward strangers and territorialism, while its deeper mystery remained unresolved.

=== Awards and nominations ===
Award	Date of ceremony	Category	Recipient(s)	Result	Ref(s)
Canadian Screen Awards	28 May 2020	Best Supporting Actress	Larissa Corriveau	Nominated	
Canadian Screen Awards	28 May 2020	Best Adapted Screenplay	Denis Côté	Nominated	
Prix Iris	2 June 2019	Best Film	Ziad Touma	Nominated	
Prix Iris	2 June 2019	Best Actress	Josée Deschênes	Nominated	
Prix Iris	2 June 2019	Best Supporting Actress	Larissa Corriveau	Nominated	
Prix Iris	2 June 2019	Best Director	Denis Côté	Nominated	
Prix Iris	2 June 2019	Best Art Direction	Marie-Pier Fortier	Nominated	
Prix Iris	2 June 2019	Best Casting	Denis Côté	Nominated	
Prix Iris	2 June 2019	Best Cinematography	François Messier-Rheault	Nominated	
Prix Iris	2 June 2019	Best Costume Design	Caroline Bodson	Nominated	
Prix Iris	2 June 2019	Best Hair	Dominique T. Hasbani	Nominated	
Prix Iris	2 June 2019	Best Makeup	Dominique T. Hasbani	Nominated	
