= I Am Sirat =

2023 Canadian documentary film by Deepa Mehta and Sirat Taneja

- Directed by: Deepa Mehta; Sirat Taneja
- Starring: Sirat Taneja
- Edited by: Kabir Singh Chowdhry
- Release date: September 14, 2023 (TIFF)
- Running time: 87 minutes
- Countries: Canada; India
- Language: Punjabi

I Am Sirat is a Canadian-Indian documentary film, directed by Deepa Mehta and Sirat Taneja and slated for release in 2023. The film profiles Taneja, a transgender woman in New Delhi, India, who is navigating a complex reality as she lives and works as a woman in her professional career and as a social media personality, while still holding the familial responsibilities of a son, rather than a daughter, in her relationship with her widowed mother.

The film premiered at the 2023 Toronto International Film Festival.

== Reception ==
CBC picked up the documentary and will air it on March 3, 2024.
