= Robin L'Houmeau =

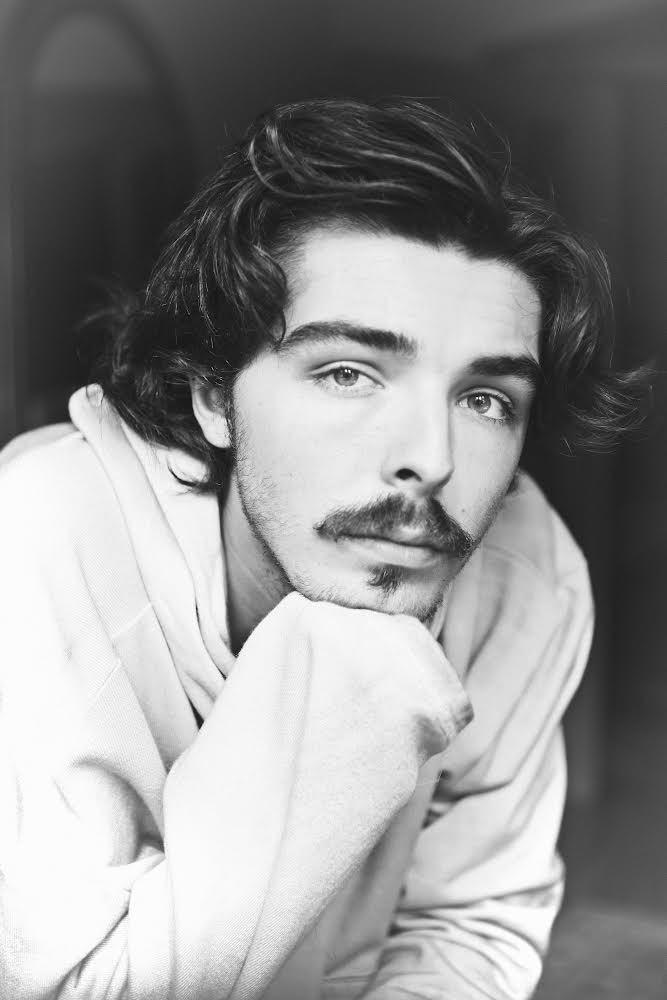

Robin L'Houmeau is a Canadian actor from Val-d'Or, Quebec. He is most noted for his performance in the 2020 film Goddess of the Fireflies (La déesse des mouches à feu), for which he received a Prix Iris nomination for Best Supporting Actor at the 23rd Quebec Cinema Awards in 2021.

He has also appeared in the television series Jeu, Fugueuse and So Long, Marianne, and in the films Happy Face, The Dishwasher (Le Plongeur) and Gaby's Hills (Gaby les collines).
