= Mothers and Monsters =

2023 Canadian short film directed by Édith Jorisch

- Directed by: Édith Jorisch
- Written by: Édith Jorisch
- Produced by: Patrick Francke-Sirois; Isabelle Grignon-Francke; Édith Jorisch
- Starring: Juliette Gariépy; Mylène Mackay
- Cinematography: Olivier Gossot
- Edited by: Louis Chevalier-Dagenais
- Production company: Club Video
- Release date: September 10, 2023 (TIFF)
- Running time: 15 minutes
- Country: Canada

Mothers and Monsters is a 2023 Canadian short drama film, written and directed by Édith Jorisch. An allegory for women's anxieties and fears about motherhood, the film depicts a group of women at a banquet whose babies are delivered to them in heads of cabbage, amid an increasingly strange and surreal environment.

The cast includes Dean Brisson, Ines Defosse, Arielle Fournier, Juliette Gariépy, Noémie Lanoix, Mylène Mackay, Sarah Ouimette and Aline Winant.

The film premiered at the 2023 Toronto International Film Festival. It was subsequently screened at the 2023 Festival du nouveau cinéma, where it won the audience award in the national short film competition.

The film was named to TIFF's annual Canada's Top Ten list for 2023. The film was a Canadian Screen Award nominee for Best Live Action Short Drama at the 12th Canadian Screen Awards in 2024, and received a Prix Iris nomination for Best Live Action Short Film at the 26th Quebec Cinema Awards in 2024.
