= Animanimals =

- Created by: Julia Ocker
- Written by: Julia Ocker
- Directed by: Julia Ocker
- Country of origin: Germany
- Original languages: English; German
- No. of seasons: 2
- No. of episodes: 52

Production
- Producer: Thomas Meyer-Hermann
- Running time: 5 minutes
- Production companies: Studio Film Bilder; Meta Media Entertainment

Original release
- Network: KiKa; SWR (Germany)
- Release: October 12, 2013 – April 26, 2018

Animanimals is a German flash-animated children's comedy television series. The series is created and directed by Julia Ocker, produced by Studio Film Bilder and Meta Media Entertainment, and airs on Kika and SWR in Germany. The series won a Grimme-Preis television award in 2019. It was a nominee for 2019's International Emmy Kids Award for Best Preschool series.

== Premise ==
The series follows a wide variety of animals, insects, and creatures, facing quirky scenarios in every episode. When something goes wrong, the animals try something new.

== Broadcast ==
This series is also shown on Disney Channel in Japan, ITVBe in the UK, PTS Taiwan, TVOKids in Canada, Discovery Kids in MENA, Télé-Québec and Knowledge Kids in Canada, YLE in Finland, NRK in Norway, JimJam in EMEA, BabyFirst in the United States and TVNZ in New Zealand.

== Cast ==
- Elephant
- Zebra
- Lion
- Horse
- Cow
- Ant
- Sheep
- Crab
- Earthworm
- Fly
- Octopus
- Bear
