= Ara Ball =

Canadian film director and screenwriter

Ara Ball (born July 30, 1982) is a Canadian film director and screenwriter from Quebec. He is most noted as a two-time Prix Jutra/Prix Iris nominee for Best Live Action Short Film, receiving nominations at the 16th Jutra Awards in 2014 for Hurricane Boy Fuck You Tabarnak! (L'Ouragan Fuck You Tabarnak!), and at the 18th Quebec Cinema Awards in 2016 for The Pedophile (Le Pédophile).

His debut feature film, When Love Digs a Hole (Quand l'amour se creuse un trou), was released in 2018. A feature film expansion of Hurricane Boy Fuck You Tabarnak! was announced in 2022, and premiered at the 2023 Festival du nouveau cinéma.

== Filmography ==
- Bros – 2009, short film
- Hurricane Boy Fuck You Tabarnak! (L'Ouragan Fuck You Tabarnak!) – 2013, short film
- The Pedophile (Le Pédophile) – 2015, short film
- Life in the Alley (Vie d'ruelles) – 2016, short film
- When Love Digs a Hole (Quand l'amour se creuse un trou) – 2018, feature film
- Hurricane Boy Fuck You Tabarnak! (L'Ouragan Fuck You Tabarnak!) – 2023, feature film
