= Hate to Love: Nickelback =

2023 Canadian documentary film

- Film poster
- Directed by: Leigh Brooks
- Produced by: Ben Jones
- Starring: Nickelback
- Cinematography: Richard Lynch
- Production company: Gimme Sugar Productions
- Release date: September 8, 2023 (TIFF)
- Running time: 90 minutes
- Country: Canada
- Language: English

Hate to Love: Nickelback is a 2023 documentary film directed by Leigh Brooks. It profiles the Canadian rock band Nickelback, centering on their evolution from one of the most commercially successful rock bands in the world in the 2000s to one of the most culturally reviled rock bands in the world in the 2010s.

The film premiered at the 2023 Toronto International Film Festival.

== Reception ==
On the review aggregator website Rotten Tomatoes, 56% of 9 critics' reviews are positive, with an average rating of 5.8/10.

David Fear of Rolling Stone wrote, "To call Hate to Love a vanity project is giving it too much credit. It is merely something that follows a tried-and-true formula, and uses it to tell the story of a highly divisive band that could really be the story of any band, or every band. This is how it reminds you that Nickelback is a Canadian rock group, and what more do you need to know than that? The movie simply repeats that basic tenet over and over, loudly and without any sense of self-consciousness. Which truly makes this the Nickelback of rock docs."
