= Witch Prophet =

- Also known as: Ayo Leilani
- Born: Etmet Musa
- Labels: Heart Lake Records, 88 Days of Fortune
- Website: www.WitchProphet.com

Etmet Musa, also known by her alias Ayo Leilani and her stage name Witch Prophet, is an Ethiopian/Eritrean musician based in Toronto, Ontario. As Witch Prophet, she has released 3 albums: The Golden Octave (2018), DNA Activation (2020), and Gateway Experience (2023). She co-founded and is the co-director of 88 Days of Fortune, a collective based in Toronto since 2009 that rebranded as Heart Lake Records in 2018. She also is a member of Above Top Secret, an electro-hip hop group. Above Top Secret has released three studio albums since 2010. DNA Activation was shortlisted for the 2020 Polaris Music Prize. In 2021, she released a new song "Leilani", which appeared on the deluxe edition of DNA Activation. The deluxe edition was released July 23, 2021. Her third album as Witch Prophet, entitled Gateway Experience, was released May 1, 2023. The first single from the album, "Energy Vampire", was released on February 23, 2023, and featured DillanPonders. Gateway Experience was longlisted for the 2023 Polaris Music Prize.

She is the subject of Loveleen Kaur's 2023 documentary film Leilani's Fortune, which won the Audience Award for Best Documentary Film at the 2023 Inside Out Film and Video Festival. In the same year, she was also one of several subjects profiled in the documentary film Coven.

== Discography ==
=== With Above Top Secret ===
==== Studio albums ====
- dis rupt dis reality, (2010)
- Siren Songs (2012)
- Above Top Secret (2016)

=== As Witch Prophet ===
==== Studio albums ====
- The Golden Octave (2018)
- DNA Activation (2020)
- Gateway Experience (2023)
- Words Are Spells, Thoughts Are Magic (2026)

==== EPs ====
- H.P.B. (2016)
- Architect of Heartbreak Remixes (2017)
