= Manufacturing the Threat =

2023 Canadian documentary film

- Directed by: Amy Miller
- Written by: Amy Miller
- Produced by: Amy Miller
- Starring: John Nuttall; Amanda Korody
- Cinematography: Sylvestre Guidi
- Edited by: Boban Chaldovich
- Music by: Benoît Groulx
- Production company: Wide Open Exposure Productions
- Distributed by: Diffusions Multi-Monde; Limonero Films
- Release date: May 5, 2023 (DOXA)
- Running time: 85 minutes
- Country: Canada
- Language: English

Manufacturing the Threat is a Canadian documentary film, directed by Amy Miller and released in 2023. The film centres on the case of John Nuttall and Amanda Korody, a couple from Surrey, British Columbia, who, after converting to Islam, were coerced by undercover Royal Canadian Mounted Police agents into participating in a fake terrorist plot concocted solely to entrap them in a crime.

Nuttall and Korody spent three years in prison before being cleared by the British Columbia Supreme Court in 2016, and subsequently launched a lawsuit against the RCMP in 2022.

The film premiered at the DOXA Documentary Film Festival in May 2023.

== Awards ==
Award	Date of ceremony	Category	Recipient(s)	Result	Ref.
Prix Iris	December 8, 2024	Most Successful Film Outside Quebec	Amy Miller	Nominated	
