= Amy Miller =

Canadian filmmaker

Amy Miller is a Canadian film-maker. Previously an activist and union organizer, she started making films in 2007. Her documentaries include Myths for Profit (2009), The Carbon Rush (2012), No Land No Food No Life (2013), Tomorrow's Power (2017), Gaza: Health Under Siege (2018) and Manufacturing the Threat (2023). She founded the production company Wide Open Exposure.

== Life ==
Miller was arrested in 2002 for her involvement in a protest known as the Seven Year Squat. The squat consisted of an occupation of an abandoned privately owned building at 246 Gilmour Street in Ottawa by "anti-poverty activists, homeless youth and anti-G8 protestors." The squat was so named because of the reported seven-year delay faced by those on a waiting list for subsidized housing in Ottawa. Police used tear gas to force protesters to leave the building. After her arrest, Miller and her co-defendants mounted a defence which consisted of necessity and Colour of right. In a 2004 interview, Miller explained: "How much do we tolerate direct action as a society? And that was our big defence. What do we tolerate? We're going to get so upset about people taking over an abandoned house and using it, and in the same blink of an eye, we tolerate how many homeless people sleeping in our streets every night?"

In 2007, Miller stopped working as a union organizer and decided to make documentary films. She moved to Serbia and made short film, Outside of EUrope, before moving back to Canada in 2008. She started making documentaries and later founded the production company Wide Open Exposure. She was mentioned in a 2010 Maclean's feature on "middle aged anarchists," which profiled the activities of Seven Year Squat Participants. She was also involved in the Coalition for Justice for Adil Charkaoui, which advocated for the rights of those detained using security certificates.

Miller was the subject of controversy during the 2010 G20 protests after she told journalists about the treatment of detained women by police officers. In a press conference held after she was released, Miller told journalists that she and other women had been threatened with rape and that some detained women had been sexually assaulted. In a meeting of the parliamentary Standing Committee on Public Safety and National Security, Amy's testimony was referenced by Member of Parliament Maria Mourani: "She was told that they would have a lot of 'fun with her' and that she would never want to come to Toronto again."

== Filmography ==
Myths for Profit: Canada’s Role in Industries of War and Peace (2009) was Miller's feature directorial debut. The film's narrative is structured around debunking three myths about Canada's role in the world.

Miller's second documentary feature film was The Carbon Rush (2012), which examines carbon trading projects around the world. It was narrated by Daryl Hannah. After the film was successful, Miller wrote a book to accompany it called The Carbon Rush: The Truth Behind the Carbon Market Smokescreen.

In No Land No Food No Life (2013) Miller explores sustainable small-scale agriculture in Cambodia, Mali, and Uganda. The English version is narrated by Neve Campbell and the French version by Céline Bonnier. Tomorrow’s Power (2017) is documentary following three activist communities in the Arauca Department of Colombia, Germany and the Gaza Strip. Gaza: Health under Siege (2018) follows Palestinian workers keeping hospitals powered and ensuring clean water during a blockade by Israel.
