= Muscat (film) =

2023 Canadian short film directed by Philippe Grenier

- Directed by: Philippe Grenier
- Written by: Philippe Grenier
- Produced by: Sophie Ricard-Harvey; Charlotte Beaudoin-Poisson
- Starring: Ilyes Tarmasti; Alexandre Bergeron
- Cinematography: Derek Branscombe
- Edited by: Philippe Grenier
- Music by: Nicolas Maranda
- Production company: Ô Films
- Distributed by: h264 Distribution
- Release date: October 7, 2023 (FNC)
- Running time: 16 minutes
- Country: Canada
- Languages: French; English; Darija

Muscat is a Canadian short drama film, written and directed by Philippe Grenier and released in 2023. The film stars Ilyes Tarmasti as Samir, a teenager in a village in Morocco who discovers his attraction to men when he meets foreign tourist Louis (Alexandre Bergeron), only to be challenged when his brother (Mahmoud Zabennej) figures it out and threatens him.

Tarmasti received a Canadian Screen Award nomination for Best Performance in a Live Action Short Drama at the 12th Canadian Screen Awards in 2024.
