= Aphasia (film) =

2023 Canadian short film directed by Marielle Dalpé

- French: Aphasie
- Directed by: Marielle Dalpé
- Written by: Marielle Dalpé
- Produced by: Marc Bertrand
- Starring: Clare Coulter; Andrée Lachapelle
- Edited by: Natacha Dufaux
- Production company: National Film Board of Canada
- Release date: September 11, 2023 (TIFF)
- Running time: 3 minutes
- Country: Canada

Aphasia (French: Aphasie) is a Canadian animated short film, written and directed by Marielle Dalpé and released in 2023. Inspired in part by Dalpé's grandmother's struggle with Alzheimer disease, the film depicts the helplessness of a woman whose ability to communicate is impacted by aphasia, with both the animation and the sound design shifting to illustrate the loss of her words.

The film was released in both French and English versions, with the English narration performed by Clare Coulter and the French narration voiced by Andrée Lachapelle in one of her final performances before her death. The English version premiered at the 2023 Toronto International Film Festival, and the French version premiered at the 2023 Festival du nouveau cinéma.

The film received a Canadian Screen Award nomination for Best Animated Short at the 12th Canadian Screen Awards in 2024.
