= Going In (film) =

Canadian neo-noir meta comedy film Evan Rissi

Going In is a 2023 Canadian neo-noir meta-comedy film written, directed by, and starring Evan Rissi.

== Production ==
Set in Toronto in 1989, the film follows two former friends who must reconnect through alcoholism to infiltrate an underground crime ring when a new drug epidemic has taken over the city. The film's budget was partly funded by a proof of concept crowdfunding campaign in 2016, in which Rissi demonstrated the desire to produce an 80s genre film shot and set downtown Toronto. The feature was shot between 2018 and 2019 and predominantly features archival Toronto landmarks, 80s technology and fashion, and period appropriate Canadian nostalgia. Although shot historically accurate with the use of authentic props and vintage anamorphic lenses, it was a microbudget feature made for less than $80,000.

As a result of the long standing duration of the Covid 19 pandemic, the film did not screen at any festivals or receive a publicized premiere. It was acquired by Vortex Media for worldwide distribution and was released digitally and physically on VHS on 19 December 2023.

== Critical response ==
Barry Hertz of The Globe and Mail commented, "With its synth-heavy score, outrageously loud fashion, and gritty Toronto cityscapes devoid of skyscrapers, the Canadian buddy-cop movie Going In feels like a long-lost cultural artifact, a tax-shelter flick from the 80's ... an ambitious passion project that looks like it cost at least 10 times its budget."

Richard Crouse on Rotten Tomatoes wrote, "The party trick Rissi manages here is ride the line between satire and straight-faced storytelling. It works, even if the action scenes are scarce and hindered by the film’s shoestring $80,000 budget."

Chris Knight of Original Cin insists, "It isn’t just set in 1989 Toronto. It looks like it was filmed there, released then, and only now is being rediscovered. It exists at the sweet nexus of looking back fondly and living in the moment, like some kind of Zen Venn diagram ... but there’s never any winking. Even when it’s funny (and it often is), Going In is seriously funny, and it wants us to take it in that same spirit."
