= Summer Qamp =

2023 Canadian documentary film by Jen Markowitz

- Directed by: Jen Markowitz
- Produced by: Tanya Blake; Michelle Mama
- Cinematography: Lulu Wei
- Edited by: Derek Esposito; Cecilio Escobar
- Music by: Ames Bessada
- Production companies: Bright West Entertainment; Cineflix; Hello Friend Media
- Distributed by: Super Channel; TVA
- Release date: September 9, 2023 (TIFF)
- Running time: 80 minutes
- Country: Canada
- Language: English

Summer Qamp is a 2023 Canadian documentary film, directed by Jen Markowitz. The film profiles Camp fYrefly, a summer camp program in Alberta that provides a safe space for LGBTQ youth.

== Background ==
The film profiles Camp fYrefly, a summer camp program in Alberta that provides a safe space for LGBTQ youth. According to Markowitz, "it’s important to show the public at large that this is a community of regular kids with regular kid problems. They are all regular kids at heart, they just happened to be really weighed down by a lot of this other stuff that is put on to them by the world."

The project was first announced as a documentary television series in 2021, and was later revised into a feature documentary film.

== Release ==
The film premiered at the 2023 Toronto International Film Festival, and will be distributed principally as a television broadcast on Super Channel in English and TVA in French.

== Awards ==
At TIFF, the film was named first runner-up for the People's Choice Award for Documentaries.

At the 2023 Calgary International Film Festival, the film received a special jury citation from the Best Canadian Feature Documentary award jury, and was the winner of the Audience Choice award for best Canadian documentary.

Derek Esposito and Cecilio Escobar received a Canadian Screen Award nomination for Best Editing in a Documentary at the 12th Canadian Screen Awards in 2024.
