= Families' Albums =

2023 Canadian short film directed by Moïa Jobin-Paré

- French: Albums de familles
- Directed by: Moïa Jobin-Paré
- Written by: Moïa Jobin-Paré
- Edited by: Moïa Jobin-Paré
- Music by: Moïa Jobin-Paré
- Animation by: Moïa Jobin-Paré
- Distributed by: La Distributrice de films
- Release date: September 2023 (OIAF)
- Running time: 8 minutes
- Country: Canada

Families' Albums (French: Albums de familles) is a Canadian animated short film, directed by Moïa Jobin-Paré and released in 2023. Told without dialogue, the film presents an abstract representation of images from various family photo albums, constituting a reflection on the role of images in the construction and distortion of human memory.

The film premiered at the 2023 Ottawa International Animation Festival, and was later screened at festivals including the 2023 Festival du nouveau cinéma, the 2024 Clermont-Ferrand International Short Film Festival, and the 2024 Annecy International Animation Film Festival.

== Awards ==
Award	Date of ceremony	Category	Recipient(s)	Result	Ref.
Ottawa International Animation Festival	2023	Best Non-Narrative	Moïa Jobin-Paré	Won	
Prix Iris	December 8, 2024	Best Animated Short Film	Moïa Jobin-Paré	Nominated	
