= Evan Rissi =

Canadian actor

Evan Rissi is a Canadian director, writer, and actor.

== Career ==
After working as a comedian in the early 2010s, Rissi was the editor of King Skate Magazine until 2016. He then moved to the film industry, writing, directing and acting in various projects, produce short films for Thrasher Magazine and others, and develop new intellectual properties.

In 2016, he created a short proof of concept film to raise money via crowdfunding to fund his first feature length film. The resulting project was Going In, a comedic neo-noir set downtown Toronto in 1989. Shot between 2018 and 2019, the film was finally released on December 19, 2023 and spotlighted in The Globe and Mail. The limited release received positive reviews from Toronto-based film critics who mentioned its ambition, creative conviction, and dedication to the "authentic Toronto experience".

Rissi’s works are often satire or meta but present as legitimate and serious, with Richard Crouse of Rotten Tomatoes commenting, "The party trick Rissi manages is to ride the line between satire and straight-faced storytelling."
