= Hurricane Boy Fuck You Tabarnak! =

2023 Canadian film

Hurricane F.Y.T!
- French: L'Ouragan F.Y.T!
- Directed by: Ara Ball
- Written by: Ara Ball; Tania Duguay Castilloux
- Produced by: Frédéric Bohbot; Kacim Steets Azouz
- Starring: Justin Labelle; Larissa Corriveau; Antoine Olivier Pilon; Julie Le Breton
- Cinematography: Ian Lagarde
- Edited by: Ara Ball
- Production companies: Bunbury Films; Rebel Labs
- Distributed by: Funfilm Distribution
- Release date: October 7, 2023 (FNC)
- Running time: 110 minutes
- Country: Canada
- Languages: English; French

Hurricane F.Y.T! (French: L'Ouragan F.Y.T!) is a French Canadian drama film, directed by Ara Ball and released in 2023. The film centres on Delphis (Justin Labelle), a young boy from a rough neighbourhood in Montreal who calls himself "the Hurricane", who runs away from home to live life by his own rules.

The supporting cast includes Julie Le Breton, Antoine Olivier Pilon, Karine Gonthier-Hyndman, Martin Dubreuil, Larissa Corriveau, Émile Schneider, Jean-Pierre Bergeron, Patrice Dubois, Nico Racicot, Pascale Montpetit, Margot Blondin, Normand Chouinard, Isabelle Miquelon, Joanie Guérin, Mathieu Lepage, Gabrielle B. Thuot and David Giguère.

The film is inspired by Ara Ball's 2013 short film L'Ouragan fuck you tabarnak, produced by Ara Ball & Tania Duguay, which starred Luka Limoges as Delphis and was a Prix Jutra nominee for Best Live Action Short Film at the 16th Jutra Awards in 2014.

In 2022, Bunbury Films announced that the full-length version was in development. It premiered in the national feature competition at the 2023 Festival du nouveau cinéma.

The film was shortlisted for the 2025 Prix collégial du cinéma québécois.
