= Boil Alert =

2023 film by Stevie Salas and James Burns

- Release poster
- Directed by: Stevie Salas; James Burns
- Story by: Stevie Salas; James Burns
- Produced by: Stevie Salas
- Starring: Layla Staats; Autumn Peltier; Jessica Matten; Santee Smith; Michelle Thrush
- Narrated by: Zoe Hopkins
- Edited by: Dalton Price; James Burns
- Music by: Found Objects
- Production companies: Seeing Red 6Nations; Utopia
- Release date: September 15, 2023 (TIFF)
- Running time: 104 minutes
- Country: Canada
- Language: English
- Box office: $7,575

Boil Alert is a 2023 Canadian documentary film, directed by Stevie Salas and James Burns. The film profiles artist and activist Layla Staats, as she investigates and campaigns around issues of unsafe and unclean water supply in indigenous communities in both Canada and the United States.

The film premiered at the Toronto International Film Festival on September 15, 2023.

== Cast ==
- Layla Staats
- Autumn Peltier
- Jessica Matten
- Santee Smith
- Michelle Thrush
