= Jen Markowitz =

Jen Markowitz is a Canadian film and television director and producer, whose feature documentary film debut Summer Qamp was released in 2023.

== Career ==
=== Television work ===
Markowitz previously worked in documentary and reality television, including on the series Vice Canada Reports, Canada's Drag Race, and Call Me Mother.

Markowitz is a three-time Canadian Screen Award winner for their work on Canada's Drag Race, winning Best Writing in a Lifestyle or Reality/Competition Program or Series at the 9th Canadian Screen Awards in 2021 for the episode "Welcome to the Family", and Best Reality/Competition Series both at the 9th Canadian Screen Awards at the 10th Canadian Screen Awards in 2022 as a producer of the series.

=== Summer Qamp ===
Markowitz made their feature film directing debut with Summer Qamp, a documentary which profiles Camp fYrefly, a summer camp program in Alberta that provides a safe space for LGBTQ youth. According to Markowitz, "it’s important to show the public at large that this is a community of regular kids with regular kid problems. They are all regular kids at heart, they just happened to be really weighed down by a lot of this other stuff that is put on to them by the world." The project was first announced as a documentary television series in 2021, and was later revised into a feature documentary film.

The film premiered at the 2023 Toronto International Film Festival. At TIFF, the film was named first runner-up for the People's Choice Award for Documentaries. At the 2023 Calgary International Film Festival, the film received a special jury citation from the Best Canadian Feature Documentary award jury, and was the winner of the Audience Choice award for best Canadian documentary.

== Personal life ==
Markowitz identifies as non-binary and uses gender-neutral pronouns.
