= Summer of 2000 =

2023 Canadian short film directed by Virginie Nolin and Laurence Olivier

- French: Été 2000
- Directed by: Virginie Nolin; Laurence Olivier
- Written by: Virginie Nolin; Laurence Olivier
- Produced by: Estelle Champoux; Mylène Corbeil
- Starring: Millie-Jeanne Drouin; Jeana Arseneau; Dylan Walsh
- Cinematography: Isabelle Stachtchenko
- Edited by: Ariane Pétel-Despots
- Production company: La Créative Films
- Distributed by: Travelling Distribution
- Release date: September 2023 (AIFF)
- Running time: 20 minutes
- Country: Canada
- Language: French

Summer of 2000 (French: Été 2000) is a Canadian coming-of-age drama short film, directed by Virginie Nolin and Laurence Olivier and released in 2023. The film centres on Sarah (Millie-Jeanne Drouin), a young girl whose emerging sense of identity, and understanding of love and sexuality, are disrupted when she is forced to deal with the aftermath of being assaulted.

The cast also includes Jeana Arseneau, William St-Louis and Dylan Walsh.

The film premiered at the 2023 Atlantic International Film Festival.

== Awards ==
Award	Date of ceremony	Category	Recipient(s)	Result	Ref.
Festival du nouveau cinéma	2023	Best Short Film, National Competition	Virginie Nolin, Laurence Olivier	Won	
Festival International du Film Francophone de Namur	2024	Best Short Film, Jury Special Mention	Virginie Nolin, Laurence Olivier	Honored	
Prix Iris	December 8, 2024	Best Live Action Short Film	Virginie Nolin, Laurence Olivier, Estelle Champoux, Mylène Corbeil	Won	
