= Coven (2023 film) =

2023 Canadian documentary film

- Directed by: Rama Rau
- Written by: Rama Rau
- Produced by: Ed Barreveld
- Starring: Laura Hokstad; Andra Zlatescu; Ayo Leilani
- Cinematography: Patrick McGowan; Jason Providence
- Edited by: Rob Ruzic
- Music by: Ken Myhr
- Production company: Storyline Entertainment
- Distributed by: Espresso Media
- Release date: April 28, 2023 (Hot Docs)
- Running time: 88 minutes
- Country: Canada
- Language: English

Coven is a Canadian documentary film directed by Rama Rau, released in 2023. The film focuses on three millennial women who practice witchcraft, including musician Witch Prophet.

The film premiered at the 2023 Hot Docs Canadian International Documentary Festival.

Patrick McGowan and Jason Providence received a Canadian Screen Award nomination for Best Cinematography in a Documentary at the 12th Canadian Screen Awards in 2024.

== See also ==
- List of films about witchcraft
