= I Used to Live There =

2023 Canadian short film directed by Ryan McKenna

- Directed by: Ryan McKenna
- Written by: Ryan McKenna
- Produced by: Ryan McKenna
- Starring: Daniel Gerson; Monika Schneider
- Cinematography: Clark Ferguson
- Edited by: Ryan McKenna
- Distributed by: La Distributrice de Films
- Release date: August 2023 (Locarno)
- Running time: 14 minutes
- Country: Canada
- Language: English

I Used to Live There is a 2023 Canadian short drama film written, directed, produced, and edited by Ryan McKenna. Blending documentary-style filmmaking with fictional elements, the film stars Daniel Gerson and Monika Schneider as semi-fictionalized versions of themselves, and focuses on the relationship between a photographer who is losing his vision due to a degenerative eye disease and the actress who hired him to take her new headshots.

The film premiered at the 76th Locarno Film Festival in August 2023, and had its Canadian premiere at the 2023 Toronto International Film Festival.

The film was named to TIFF's annual Canada's Top Ten list for 2023, and received a Prix Iris nomination for Best Live Action Short Film at the 26th Quebec Cinema Awards in 2024.

McKenna previously made another short film about Gerson's struggle with his deteriorating vision, Gerson Workout (2020), for the Greetings from Isolation project.
