= Lake Baikal (film) =

2023 film by Alisi Telengut

- Mongolian: Baigal Nuur
- Directed by: Alisi Telengut
- Written by: Alisi Telengut
- Produced by: Alisi Telengut
- Narrated by: Marina Dorzhieva
- Animation by: Alisi Telengut
- Release date: June 2023 (Annecy)
- Running time: 9 minutes
- Countries: Canada; Germany
- Language: Buryat

Lake Baikal (Mongolian: Baigal Nuur) is a Canadian animated short film, directed by Alisi Telengut and released in 2023. The film depicts the ancient creation of Lake Baikal, and the culture, society and history of the Buryat people who live on its shores.

The film premiered at the 2023 Annecy International Animation Film Festival, and had its Canadian premiere at the 2023 Toronto International Film Festival.

The film was named to TIFF's annual Canada's Top Ten list for 2023.
