= Laurence Olivier (Canadian director) =

Canadian writer and filmmaker

Laurence Olivier (born 1988) is a Canadian writer and filmmaker from Quebec. She is most noted for her 2015 novel Répertoire des villes disparues, which was adapted by Denis Côté into the 2019 film Ghost Town Anthology (Répertoire des villes disparues).

She has also been a filmmaker and screenwriter, in partnership with Virginie Nolin. Their 2023 short film Summer of 2000 (Été 2000) won the Prix Iris for Best Live Action Short Film at the 26th Quebec Cinema Awards in 2024.
