= Gaby's Hills =

2023 Canadian short film directed by Zoé Pelchat

- French: Gaby les collines
- Directed by: Zoé Pelchat
- Written by: Zoé Pelchat
- Produced by: Véronique Charbonneau
- Starring: Lou Thompson; Emmanuel Bilodeau; Catherine De Léan
- Cinematography: Gabriel Brault-Tardif
- Edited by: Amélie Labrèche
- Music by: Laurence Lafond-Beaulne
- Production company: Papillon Films
- Distributed by: H264 Distribution
- Release date: February 20, 2023 (Berlin)
- Running time: 21 minutes
- Country: Canada
- Language: French

Gaby's Hills (French: Gaby les collines) is a Canadian coming-of-age drama short film, directed by Zoé Pelchat and released in 2023. The film centres on Gaby (Lou Thompson), a 13-year-old girl spending the summer with her father Jasmin (Emmanuel Bilodeau) in the Magdalen Islands region of Quebec; however, having undergone puberty since the last time she visited, she finds she must navigate new challenges as the community is now reacting to her as a young woman rather than as a girl.

The cast also includes Catherine De Léan, Gaspard Chartrand, Robin L'Houmeau, Jérémy Poirier, Cécilia Lapierre and Léon-Charles Arseneau.

The film premiered in the Generation Kplus youth program at the 73rd Berlin International Film Festival. It was later screened in the Short Cuts program at the 2023 Toronto International Film Festival, where it received an honorable mention from the Share Her Journey award jury.

The film was named to TIFF's annual Canada's Top Ten list for 2023, and received a Prix Iris nomination for Best Live Action Short Film at the 26th Quebec Cinema Awards in 2024.
