= Sawo Matang =

2023 Canadian short film directed by Andrea Nirmala Widjajanto

- Directed by: Andrea Nirmala Widjajanto
- Written by: Andrea Nirmala Widjajanto
- Produced by: Annisa Adjam; Matthew Herst
- Starring: Anne Yasmine; Yesaya Mishael
- Cinematography: Janice Angelica; Bing Bang
- Edited by: Maziyar Khatam
- Production companies: Pidgin Productions, Inteamates, Sinema 5
- Distributed by: Square Eyes
- Release date: September 11, 2023 (TIFF)
- Running time: 21 minutes
- Countries: Indonesia, Canada, US
- Language: Indonesian

Sawo Matang is a short drama film, directed by Andrea Nirmala Widjajanto and released in 2023. Set in Indonesia following the New Order, the film stars Anne Yasmine as Nala, a young Pribumi woman who must confront her place in society when her non-Pribumi lover Kai (Yesaya Mishael) asks her to take part in a Pribumi ritual.

The film premiered at the 2023 Toronto International Film Festival.

The film was named to TIFF's annual Canada's Top Ten list for 2023.
