= Virginie Nolin =

Canadian screenwriter and filmmaker from Quebec

Virginie Nolin is a Canadian screenwriter and filmmaker from Quebec. She is most noted for the 2023 short film Summer of 2000 (Été 2000), cowritten and co-directed with Laurence Olivier, which won the Prix Iris for Best Live Action Short Film at the 26th Quebec Cinema Awards in 2024.

Nolin previously directed the short films Sleeping Longing (Dormir désir) and OK, and has produced short films by other directors.

In 2024, she announced production on her first feature film, an adaptation of Mikella Nicol's novel Aphélie.
