= Andrea Nirmala Widjajanto =

Indonesian film director (born 1999)

Andrea Nirmala Widjajanto (born 1999) is an Indonesian film director. She is most noted for her short film Sawo Matang, which was named to the Toronto International Film Festival's annual year-end Canada's Top Ten list for 2023.

She made a number of student films prior to debuting her short film Srikandi at the 2021 Toronto International Film Festival. Later the same year she released Brown Enough, a short documentary film co-directed with Kent Donguines.

In 2022 she released Shallots and Garlic (Bawang Merah Bawang Putih), which utilized the body horror genre to tell a story about a young woman with an eating disorder.

== Filmography ==
- The Art of Flawsome - 2019
- Chroma - 2020
- Srikandi - 2021
- Brown Enough - 2021, with Kent Donguines
- Shallots and Garlic (Bawang Merah Bawang Putih) - 2022
- Sawo Matang - 2023
