= Ryan McKenna (filmmaker) =

Canadian film director and screenwriter

Ryan McKenna is a Canadian film director and screenwriter from Winnipeg, Manitoba. He is most noted for his 2017 short documentary film Voices of Kidnapping, which was a Canadian Screen Award nominee for Best Short Documentary at the 7th Canadian Screen Awards.

He has also directed the theatrical feature films The First Winter, The Heart of Madame Sabali (Le Cœur de Madame Sabali) and Cranks, and the short films Open Window, Chinatown, Bon voyage, Honky Tonk Ben, Four-Mile Creek, Controversies, Gerson Workout, I Used to Live There (2023) and Solitudes (2025), premiered at the 78th Locarno Film Festival.

An alumnus of the Winnipeg Film Group, he was cowriter with Matthew Rankin of the "Winnipeg Brutalist Manifesto", a Dogme 95-style manifesto of rules for films set in Winnipeg.
