= Zoé Pelchat =

Canadian film director

Zoé Pelchat is a Canadian film and television director from Quebec. She is most noted for her 2020 short film Moon (Lune), which was a Prix Iris nominee for Best Live Action Short Film at the 23rd Quebec Cinema Awards in 2021.

The daughter of Martin Pelchat, a former news director of La Presse, her web series Dominoes premiered at the inaugural 2018 Canneseries festival, where it won the award for Best Short Form Series.

She also previously directed the short films Mardi (2013), Samedi (2013), La Cour des mirages (2016) and Amaretto Sour (2016). Her newest short film, Gaby's Hills (Gaby les collines), premiered in the Generation Kplus program at the 73rd Berlin International Film Festival.
