= Jani Bellefleur-Kaltush =

Canadian film director

- Born: Nutashkuan, Quebec, Canada
- Education: Institut national de l'image et du son
- Occupation: Filmmaker
- Awards: Best Short Documentary – ImagineNATIVE Film and Media Arts Festival; 2010 Do Not Tell (Ne le dis pas / Nika tshika uiten mishkut); Best Canadian Short – Vancouver International Film Festival; 2023 Katshinau

Jani Bellefleur-Kaltush is an Innu filmmaker from Nutashkuan, Quebec, Canada. She is most noted as director of Do Not Tell (Ne le dis pas / Nika tshika uiten mishkut), which was the winner of the Best Short Documentary award at the 2010 ImagineNATIVE Film and Media Arts Festival, and co-director with Julien G. Marcotte of Katshinau (Les Mains sales), which won the award for Best Canadian Short Film at the 2023 Vancouver International Film Festival and was named to the Toronto International Film Festival's annual year-end Canada's Top Ten list for 2023.

Bellefleur-Kaltush trained at the Institut national de l'image et du son (INIS) in Quebec.

She has also directed episodes of the children's television series Couleurs du nord, and had an acting role in the television series Les Oubliettes.
