= Marielle Dalpé =

Canadian artist

Marielle Dalpé is a Canadian artist and animator from Montreal, Quebec. She is most noted for her 2023 short film Aphasia (Aphasie), which was a Canadian Screen Award nominee for Best Animated Short at the 12th Canadian Screen Awards in 2024.

She is the daughter of writer Jean-Marc Dalpé.
