= Édith Jorisch =

Canadian filmmaker

Édith Jorisch is a Canadian filmmaker from Quebec. She is most noted for her films The Heir (L'héritier), which won a Prix Gémeaux in 2017 and the Michael Moskovitz Award for a Film from the Joseph Isaac Segal Awards for Jewish Literature in 2018, and Mothers and Monsters, which was named to the Toronto International Film Festival's annual year-end Canada's Top Ten list in 2023.

She is the daughter of artist and illustrator Stéphane Jorisch, and an alumna of the Université du Québec à Montréal.

== Filmography ==
- Les Interdits - 2011
- The Heir (L'héritier) - 2016
- Awe - 2019
- Tibbits Hill - 2021
- Plastisapiens - 2022
- Mothers and Monsters - 2023
