= Julien G. Marcotte =

Canadian filmmaker

Julien Gamache-Marcotte, usually credited as Julien G. Marcotte, is a Canadian filmmaker from Quebec. He and Jani Bellefleur-Kaltush codirected Katshinau (Les Mains sales), which won Best Canadian Short Film at the 2023 Vancouver International Film Festival and was in the Toronto International Film Festival's year-end Canada's Top Ten for 2023. His first short film, Louise from 9 to 5 (Louise de 9 à 5), was released in 2021 and had its premiere at Festival du Nouveau cinéma in 2021 and travelled internationally.
