= Katshinau =

2023 short film

- French: Les Mains sales
- Directed by: Jani Bellefleur-Kaltush; Julien G. Marcotte
- Written by: Jani Bellefleur-Kaltush; Julien G. Marcotte
- Produced by: Geneviève Gosselin-G.
- Starring: Soleil Launière
- Cinematography: Nicolas Poitras-Gamache
- Edited by: Pier-Philippe Chevigny
- Production company: Le Foyer Films
- Distributed by: Welcome Aboard
- Release date: October 2, 2023 (VIFF)
- Running time: 17 minutes
- Country: Canada
- Language: French

Katshinau (French: Les Mains sales, lit. "Dirty Hands") is a Canadian short drama film, directed by Jani Bellefleur-Kaltush and Julien G. Marcotte, and released in 2023. The film stars Soleil Launière as Marie, an indigenous slave in New France who is driven to undertake radical actions to secure her freedom.

The cast also includes Fred-Eric Salvail, Geneviève Boivin-Roussy, Dorothée Gauthier Nolett, Ryan Bommarito, Benoît Mauffette and Adrien Lessard.

The film premiered at the 2023 Vancouver International Film Festival, where it was named the winner of the award for Best Canadian Short Film.

The film was named to TIFF's annual Canada's Top Ten list for 2023.
