= Chic Gamine =

Canadian musical group

- Origin: Winnipeg, Manitoba, Canada
- Genres: Folk, pop
- Years active: 2007 – present
- Members: Alexa Dirks; Andrina Turenne; Annick Bremault; Sacha Daoud; Benoit Morier
- Past members: Ariane Jean

Chic Gamine is a Canadian musical group from Winnipeg, Manitoba. Formed in 2007 by vocalists Ariane Jean, Alexa Dirks, Andrina Turenne, Annick Bremault and drummer Sacha Daoud, they began with a vocal pop style backed only by drums, but later evolved to add more instrumentation. Jean, Turenne and Bremault had previously been members of the larger vocal group Madrigaïa.

The band released its self-titled debut album in 2008. They received two Canadian Folk Music Award nominations at the 4th Canadian Folk Music Awards that year for Best Vocal Group and Best New Artist. and the album won the Juno Award for Roots and Traditional Album of the Year - Group at the Juno Awards of 2009.

They followed up with City City in 2010, receiving another Juno Award nomination for Roots and Traditional Album of the Year - Group at the Juno Awards of 2011. In 2013 they released Closer, a compilation of tracks from their first two albums released as their introduction to the United States market.

Jean left the band in 2014, and was replaced by Benoit Morier on bass guitar. The band released a Christmas EP in 2014, before following up in 2015 with their third studio album, Light a Match.

Dirks also performs as a solo artist under the stage name Begonia. Turenne has also gone on to a solo career and has had occasional roles as an actress, most notably in Rhayne Vermette's films Ste. Anne and Levers.

== Discography ==
- Chic Gamine (2008)
- City City (2010)
- Closer (2013)
- Christmas, Vol. 1 (2014)
- Light a Match (2015)
