= List of Senegalese submissions for the Academy Award for Best International Feature Film =

List of Senegalese films

Best International Feature Film submissions from Senegal

Highlights
- Debut: 2017
- Submissions: 8
- Nominations: none
- Oscar winners: none

Senegal submitted films for the Academy Award for Best International Feature Film (Note: The category was previously named the Academy Award for Best Foreign Language Film, but this was changed to the Academy Award for Best International Feature Film in April 2019, after the Academy deemed the word "Foreign" to be outdated.) since 2017. The award is handed out annually by the United States Academy of Motion Picture Arts and Sciences to a feature-length motion picture produced outside the United States that contains primarily non-English dialogue. It was not created until the 1956 Academy Awards, in which a competitive Academy Award of Merit, known as the Best Foreign Language Film Award, was created for non-English speaking films, and has been given annually since.

As of 2026, Senegal has submitted eight films, but none of them were nominated.

== Submissions ==
The Academy of Motion Picture Arts and Sciences has invited the film industries of various countries to submit their best film for the Academy Award for Best International Feature Film since 1956. The International Feature Film Committee oversees the process and reviews all the submitted films. Following this, they vote via secret ballot to determine the five nominees for the award.

Félicité (2017), Atlantics (2018), and Dahomey (2024), advanced to the December shortlists, but were not nominated.

Below is a list of the films that have been submitted by Senegal for review by the academy for the award by year and the respective Academy Awards ceremony.

Year (Ceremony)	Film title used in nomination	Original title	Language(s)	Director	Result
2017 (90th)	Félicité		French	Alain Gomis	Made shortlist
2019 (92nd)	Atlantics	Atlantique	French, Wolof	Mati Diop	Made shortlist
2020 (93rd)	Nafi's Father	Baamum Nafi	Fula	Mamadou Dia	Not nominated
2022 (95th)	Xalé		Wolof	Moussa Sene Absa	Not nominated
2023 (96th)	Banel & Adama	Banel et Adama	Pulaar, French	Ramata-Toulaye Sy	Not nominated
2024 (97th)	Dahomey		French	Mati Diop	Made shortlist
2025 (98th)	Demba		Fula	Mamadou Dia	Not on the final list
2026 (99th)	The Attachment	Liti Liti	Wolof, French	Mamadou Khouma Gueye	Pending

== See also ==
- List of Academy Award winners and nominees for Best International Feature Film
- List of Academy Award-winning foreign language films
