= Andrina Turenne =

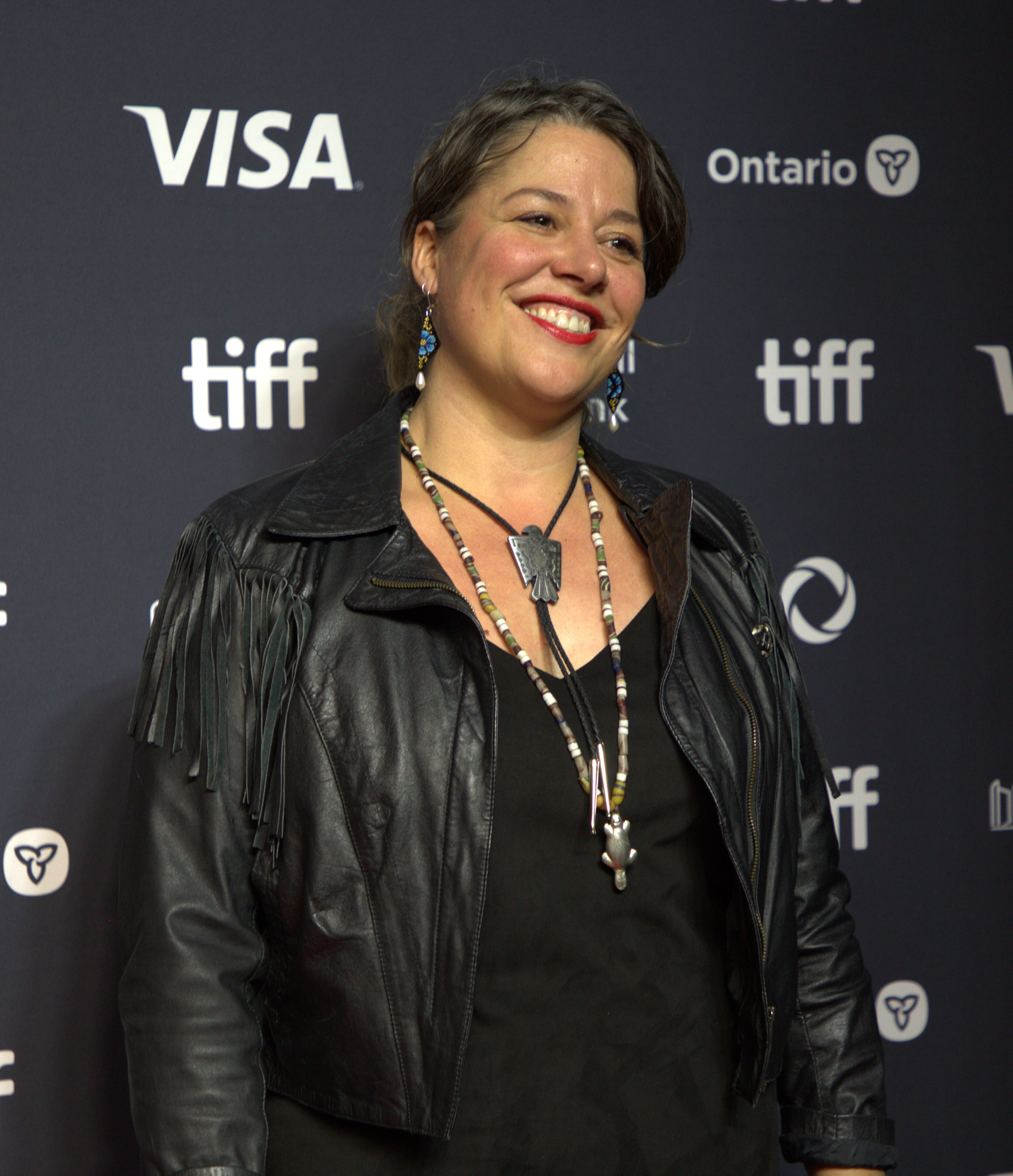
- Turenne in 2025

Andrina Turenne is a Métis Canadian folk singer-songwriter from Manitoba, best known as a member of the Juno Award-winning folk band Chic Gamine. A member of the Franco-Manitoban community, she records and performs music in both English and French.

Following a number of years recording and performing with Chic Gamine in the 2000s and 2010s, she released her solo debut album, Bold As Logs, in 2023. She followed up in 2024 with the album Je suis un arbre.

She has also had occasional roles as an actress, including in Rhayne Vermette's films Ste. Anne and Levers and a regular voice acting role in the APTN animated series Wolf Joe.
