= Astel (film) =

2021 Senegalese-French film

- Directed by: Ramata-Toulaye Sy
- Written by: Ramata-Toulaye Sy
- Produced by: Margaux Juvénal; Maud Leclair; Souleymane Kébé
- Starring: Hawa Mamadou Dia; Cherif Amadou Diallo; Khady Diallo
- Cinematography: Amine Berrada
- Edited by: Nathan Jacquard
- Music by: Amin Bouhafa
- Production companies: La Chauve Souris; Kazak Productions; Astou Productions
- Distributed by: Sudu connexion
- Release date: September 12, 2021 (TIFF)
- Running time: 24 minutes
- Countries: France; Senegal
- Language: Peul

Astel is a 2021 Senegalese-French short drama film, directed by Ramata-Toulaye Sy. The film stars Hawa Mamadou Dia as Astel, a young girl in Senegal who loves to accompany her father (Cherif Amadou Diallo) when he herds cows, but is forced to conform to more traditional "women's work" with her mother (Khady Diallo) after a shepherd's leering looks at her lead her father to realize she is no longer safe.

The film premiered at the 2021 Toronto International Film Festival, where it was the winner of the Share Her Journey award. It was subsequently screened at the 2022 Clermont-Ferrand International Short Film Festival, where it won the SACD Award and a Special Jury Prize.
