= Displaced (2021 film) =

2021 Kosovan film

- Albanian: Pa vend
- Directed by: Samir Karahoda
- Written by: Samir Karahoda
- Produced by: Eroll Bilibani
- Starring: Ermegan Kazazi; Jeton Mazreku>Rifat Rifati
- Cinematography: Samir Karahoda
- Edited by: Enis Saraçi
- Music by: Memli Kelmendi
- Production company: SK Pictures
- Distributed by: Radiator IP Sales
- Release date: 16 July 2021 (Cannes)
- Running time: 15 minutes
- Country: Kosovo
- Language: Albanian

Displaced (Albanian: Pa vend) is a Kosovan short docufiction film, directed and written by Samir Karahoda and released in 2021. Blending both documentary and fictional elements, the film centres on Ermegan and Jeton, two men in Prizren who are attempting to maintain and rebuild the local table tennis club.

The film premiered at the 2021 Cannes Film Festival, in competition for the Short Film Palme d'Or. It was subsequently screened at the 2021 Toronto International Film Festival, where it won the award for Best International Short Film. In January 2022, it received the Best Non Fiction Short Film Award at the 2022 Sundance Film Festival.

The film was a nominee for Best Short Film at the 34th European Film Awards.
