= Emre Kayiş =

Turkish film director and screenwriter

- Born: Ankara, Turkey
- Occupations: Director; screenwriter
- Years active: 2012–present

Emre Kayiş is a Turkish film director and screenwriter.

== Life and career ==
Emre was born in Ankara, Turkey. He graduated with an M.A. in Filmmaking from the London Film School in 2014, his thesis film, The Translator, which was screened at multiple film festivals and received many accolades. In 2021, he directed his first feature film Anatolian Leopard, which premiered at the Toronto International Film Festival winning the FIPRESCI Prize.

== Filmography ==
Year	Title	Contribution	Note
2014	The Couch	Director and writer	Short film
2015	The Translator	Director and writer	Short film
2020	Alef	Creator and writer	Season 1 - 8 episodes
2021	Anatolian Leopard	Director and writer	Feature film

== Awards and nominations ==
Year	Result	Award	Category	Work	Ref.
2015	Won	Carthage Film Festival	Ciné-Promesses	The Translator	
2015	Nominated	European Film Awards	European Short Film	The Translator	
2016	Won	Duhok International Film Festival	Best Short Film	The Translator	
2016	Nominated	Palm Springs International ShortFest	Best Film	The Translator	
2016	Nominated	Angers European First Film Festival	Grand Jury Prize	The Translator	
2021	Won	Toronto International Film Festival	FIPRESCI Prize	Anatolian Leopard	
2021	Won	Antalya Golden Orange Film Festival	Behlül Dal Best First Film Award	Anatolian Leopard	
2021	Won	Ankara Film Festival	Best Film	Anatolian Leopard	
2022	Nominated	Jerusalem Film Festival	Best International Debut	Anatolian Leopard	
2022	Nominated	International Film Festival of Kerala	Golden Crow Pheasant	Anatolian Leopard	
2022	Nominated	Palić European Film Festival	Best Film	Anatolian Leopard	
2022	Nominated	Beijing International Film Festival	Best Film	Anatolian Leopard	
