= Banel & Adama =

2023 French-Malian-Senegalese film

- Theatrical release poster
- French: Banel et Adama
- Directed by: Ramata-Toulaye Sy
- Written by: Ramata-Toulaye Sy
- Produced by: Eric Névé; Margaux Juvenal; Maud Leclair Névé
- Starring: Khady Mane; Mamadou Diallo
- Cinematography: Amine Berrada
- Edited by: Vincent Tricon
- Music by: Bachar Mar-Khalifé
- Production companies: La Chauve-Souris; Take Shelter; Astou Films; Astou Production; DS Productions; Canal+ International; Arte France Cinéma
- Distributed by: Tandem; Pathé BC Afrique
- Release dates: 20 May 2023 (Cannes); 30 August 2023 (France)
- Running time: 87 minutes
- Countries: France; Mali; Senegal
- Languages: Pulaar; French
- Box office: $165,366

Banel & Adama (French: Banel et Adama) is a 2023 romantic drama film directed by Senegalese screenwriter Ramata-Toulaye Sy in her feature directorial debut. The film, a French-Malian-Senegalese co-production, premiered at the 76th Cannes Film Festival on 20 May 2023. It was chosen as the Senegalese entry for Best International Feature Film at the 96th Academy Awards.

== Plot ==
Banel and Adama are young adults in their late teens who live in a remote village in northern Senegal. Adama is quiet and introverted, while Banel is passionate and rebellious. Adama and Banel fall in love and decide to live separately from their families so that they can live together. When Adama refuses to fulfil his birthright to serve as the village's future leader, chaos ensues in the community.

== Cast ==
- Khady Mane as Banel
- Mamadou Diallo as Adama
- Binta Racine Sy
- Moussa Sow
- Ndiabel Diallo
- Oumar Samba Dia
- Amadou Ndiaye

== Production ==
Banel & Adama is Ramata-Toulaye Sy's first feature film. The cast, composed of non-professional actors, performs in Pulaar, a variant of the Fula language. The film was shot on location in northern Senegal between May and June 2022.

Banel & Adama was produced by Eric Névé and Maud Leclair from La Chauve-Souris, and Margaux Juvenal from Take Shelter.

== Release ==
Banel & Adama premiered at the 76th Cannes Film Festival on 20 May 2023, where it competed for the Palme d'Or.

The film was distributed in France by Tandem on 30 August 2023.

== Reception ==
The review aggregator website Rotten Tomatoes reported an approval rating of 94% with an average rating of 6.6/10, based on 16 reviews. On Metacritic, the film has a weighted average score of 69 out of 100, based on 6 critics, indicating "generally favorable" reviews.

== Accolades ==
Award / Film Festival	Date of ceremony	Category	Recipient(s)	Result
Cannes Film Festival	27 May 2023	Palme d'Or	Ramata-Toulaye Sy	Nominated
Cannes Film Festival	27 May 2023	Caméra d'Or	Ramata-Toulaye Sy	Nominated
Melbourne International Film Festival	2023	Bright Horizons Award	Ramata-Toulaye Sy	Won

== See also ==
- List of submissions to the 96th Academy Awards for Best International Feature Film
- List of Senegalese submissions for the Academy Award for Best International Feature Film
