= Anatolian Leopard (film) =

2021 Turkish film

- Turkish: Anadolu Leoparı
- Directed by: Emre Kayiş
- Written by: Emre Kayiş
- Produced by: Olena Yershova
- Starring: Uğur Polat; Ipek Türktan; Hatice Aslan
- Cinematography: Nick Cooke
- Edited by: Ricardo Saraiva
- Production companies: Tato Film; Asteros Film
- Release date: 11 September 2021 (TIFF)
- Running time: 113 minutes
- Countries: Turkey; Poland; Germany; Denmark
- Language: Turkish

Anatolian Leopard (Turkish: Anadolu Leoparı) is a 2021 comedy-drama film written and directed by Emre Kayiş. A co-production of companies from Turkey, Poland, Germany, and Denmark, the film stars Uğur Polat as Fikret, the director of a failing zoo in Ankara who must conspire with his assistant Gamze (Ipek Türktan) to hide the fact that the zoo's Anatolian leopard has died, as the animal's protected status is the only thing preventing the zoo from being shut down and sold off to real estate developers to build a new amusement park.

The film's cast also includes Hatice Aslan, Ezgi Gör, Ege Aydan, Koray Ergün, Emrah Ozdemir, Andy Boyns, and Nuri Gökasan.

The film premiered in the Discovery program at the 2021 Toronto International Film Festival, where it was named the winner of the FIPRESCI Prize.
