= Weyni Mengesha =

Canadian film and theatre director

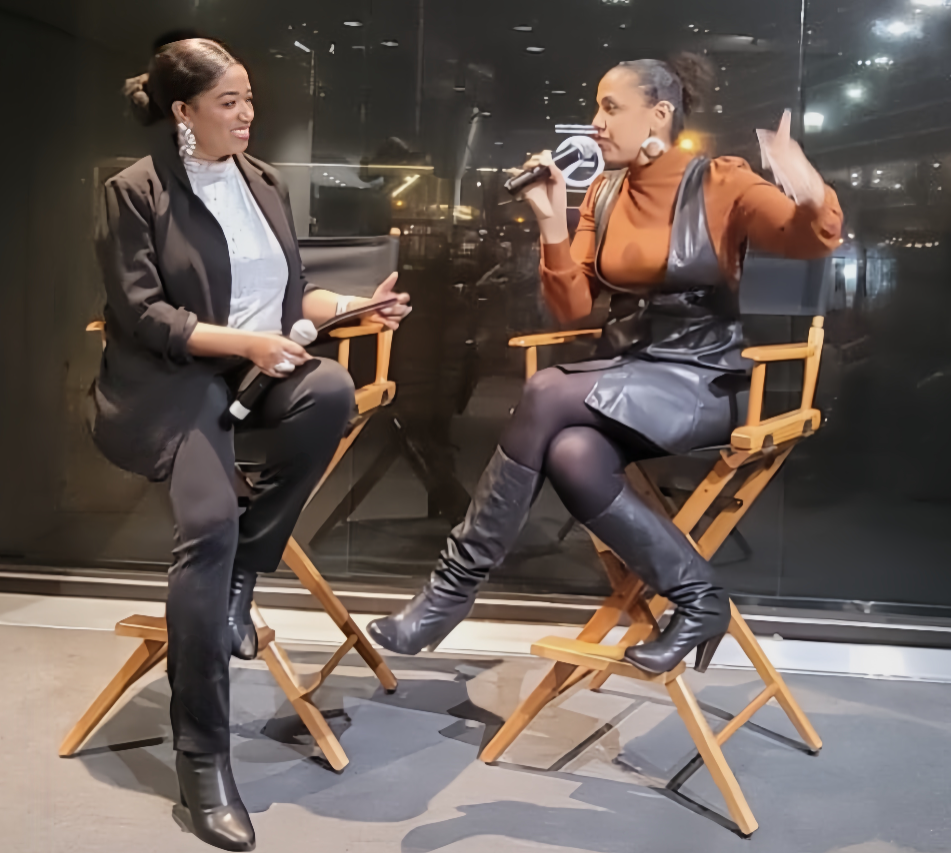
- Nicole Inica Hamilton with Weyni Mengesha - 2023
- Born: May 3, 1980 (age 46); Vancouver, British Columbia, Canada
- Occupation: Director
- Known for: Artistic director of Soulpepper Theatre
- Spouse: Eion Bailey (m. 2011)
- Children: 2
- Family: Araya Mengesha (cousin)

Weyni Mengesha is a Canadian film and theatre director, based in Toronto, Ontario. She is known as the director of the plays Da Kink in My Hair, and Kim's Convenience.

In 2018, she was hired as the artistic director of the Soulpepper Theatre. Observers applauded her appointment, and that of her colleague, executive director Emma Stenning, as it meant the two senior posts at the theatre would be filled by women, after the previous male director Albert Schultz resigned after actors accused him of preying on female subordinates.

Mengesha's parents were immigrants from Ethiopia. She is the cousin of actor Araya Mengesha. While she was born in Vancouver, Mengesha grew up in Scarborough, Ontario. She graduated from Soulpepper Academy. Mengesha has been nominated for the Dora Mavor Moore Award five times, winning the award in 2014.

Mengesha co-signed a letter of support to the Black Lives Matter movement, in June 2020, following several high profile incidents where police killed black civilians, in both the United States and Canada.

Mengesha married American actor Eion Bailey in 2011. The couple has two children.

== Legacy ==
In 2025, The Soulpepper Theatre Company in Toronto has renamed their Tank House Theatre to the Weyni Mengesha Theatre, in honor of Weyni Mengesha. That same year Weyni was honoured as a Johanna Metcalf Performing Arts Prizes finalist.
