= Maxine Bailey =

Canadian film industry executive

Maxine Bailey is a Canadian film industry executive, who is the current executive director of the Canadian Film Centre.

== Career ==
She began her career in theatre, collaborating with Sharon Lewis on the play Sistahs in 1994. The two subsequently launched their own theatre company, Sugar & Spice Productions, through which bailey received a Dora Mavor Moore Award nomination for Outstanding Direction in a Play, Small Theatre in 1996 for the company's production of Bryan James's Stockholm(e).

In 1999 she served as director of the Guest Services office for the 1999 Toronto International Film Festival, remaining with the festival in various senior roles, becoming best known as the festival's vice-president of fundraising and advancement in the 2010s. During her time with the festival, she also played a key role in spearheading the Share Her Journey campaign to improve conditions for women in the film industry.

After leaving TIFF in 2018 she served on the jury for that year's Giller Prize. She has also served on the boards of the Academy of Canadian Cinema and Television, The Walrus and the Ontario Cultural Attractions Fund, and was a co-founder of Black Artists Network in Dialogue.

She joined the Canadian Film Centre in 2021.

== Awards ==
In 2019, she received a Special Jury Award of Distinction from the Toronto chapter of Women in Film and Television International.

In 2026, the Academy of Canadian Cinema and Television named bailey the recipient of its special Changemaker Award at the 14th Canadian Screen Awards.
