= Share Her Journey =

Canadian program for women filmmakers

Share Her Journey is a Canadian film program, created by the Toronto International Film Festival to foster the career development and advancement of women in the film industry.

First launched by maxine bailey, TIFF's vice-president of advancement, in 2017 as a five-year campaign to offer residency and talent accelerator programs for emerging women filmmakers, it became more widely known in 2018 when it organized a public rally on John Street near the TIFF Bell Lightbox to publicize and advocate for action on the issues that women in film still face, including sexual harassment and lack of opportunity.

Other initiatives sponsored by the organization include industry panels; developing and promoting mentorship, networking and career development opportunities for women in the film industry, efforts to include more films directed by women in the TIFF festival lineup, and a dedicated screening series of films directed by women at both the physical and online TIFF Bell Lightbox platforms, as well as a program to subsidize the media accreditation fees for women and people of colour to attend the festival as film reviewers.

In 2021, which would have been the final year of Share Her Journey in its original form as a five-year initiative, the festival announced that it will be continued as a permanent program.

== Share Her Journey Award for Short Films ==
The Share Her Journey Award, a prize to honour the best short film by an emerging female filmmaker in the festival's Short Cuts lineup, was introduced at the 2020 Toronto International Film Festival. The short film award was last presented at the 2023 Toronto International Film Festival.

| Year | Film | Director | Ref |
|---|---|---|---|
| 2020 | Sing Me a Lullaby | Tiffany Hsiung | |
| 2021 | Astel | Ramata-Toulaye Sy | |
| 2021 | Love, Dad (Milý tati) | Diana Cam Van Nguyen | |
| 2022 | Nanitic | Carol Nguyen | |
| 2023 | Shé (Snake) | Renee Zhan | |
| 2023 | Gaby's Hills (Gaby les collines) | Zoé Pelchat | |

== Share Her Journey Groundbreaker Award ==
Beginning in 2022, Share Her Journey also launched the "Groundbreaker Award", presented as part of the TIFF Tribute Awards to honour a woman who has made a positive impact in improving conditions for women in the film industry. Unlike the award for short films, the Groundbreaker Award continues to be presented.

- 2022 - Michelle Yeoh
- 2023 - Patricia Arquette
- 2024 - Cate Blanchett
- 2025 - Jodie Foster
- 2026 - Helen Mirren
