= Araya Mengesha =

Canadian actor

Araya Mengesha Selassie
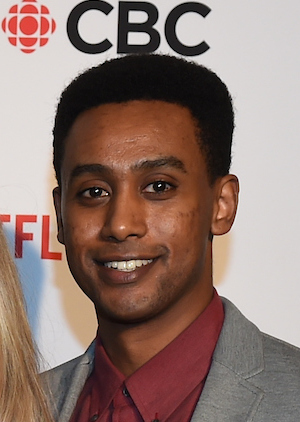
- Araya Mengesha in 2019
- Born: July 23, 1987 (age 39); Toronto, Ontario, Canada
- Occupation: Actor
- Years active: 2002–present
- Father: Prince Stefanos Mengesha Seyoum
- Relatives: Weyni Mengesha (cousin)
- Family: Solomonic dynasty

Araya Mengesha (born July 23, 1987) is a Canadian actor, best known for his role as himself on the kids documentary mystery series Mystery Hunters and as Mark Yohannes in Law & Order Toronto: Criminal Intent, in which he currently stars. He had a role in the Bob Odenkirk action film Nobody, and had a recurring role in the period drama Anne with an E. He is a claimant to the throne of Ethiopia, abolished in 1974.

== Biography ==
Mengesha was born in Toronto to Ethiopian-Canadian International business consultant Prince Stefanos Mengesha Seyoum and Eritrean-Canadian Selamawit Kiros. Through his father, he is a member of the Imperial family of Ethiopia. He is the cousin of theatre director Weyni Mengesha.

From 2002 to 2009, together with David Acer and Christina Broccolini he was a presenter of the documentary television series Mystery Hunters.

His short film Defund, co-directed with Khadijah Roberts-Abdullah, premiered at the 2021 Toronto International Film Festival, and was named to TIFF's annual year-end Canada's Top Ten list for 2021.

== Filmography ==
Year	Title	Role	Notes
2002–2009	Mystery Hunters	Himself	78 episodes
2002	Conviction	William Conamacher	TV movie
2008	Nurse.Fighter.Boy	Kandae	
2010	Nikita	Ben Prentice	
2011	Degrassi: The Next Generation	Frat Guy #1	
2012	Cul de sac	Michael	Short
2013	Saving Hope	Den Bailli	
2014	Ruby Skye P.I.: The Maltese Puppy	Zoffi	Web series
2014	Ryan Gosling Must Be Stopped	Bus Stop Guy	TV Miniseries
2018–2019	Anne With An E	Elijah	5 episodes
2020	Tiny Pretty Things	Tyler Stroyer	5 episodes
2021	Nobody	Pavel	
2021	Defund	Brother	
2022	Revenge of the Black Best Friend	Phil	
2022	Hello (Again)	Douggie	Series regular
2023	Regular	Reggie	Short film
2024–present	Law & Order Toronto: Criminal Intent	Mark Yohannes	Series regular
