= Jurassic World: Chaos Theory =

American animated television series

- Genre: Science fiction; Action-adventure; Conspiracy
- Based on: Jurassic Park by Michael Crichton
- Developed by: Scott Kreamer; Zack Stentz
- Showrunners: Scott Kreamer; Aaron Hammersley
- Directed by: Michael Mullen; Zesung Kang; Dan Forgione; Robert Briggs
- Voices of: Paul-Mikél Williams; Darren Barnet; Sean Giambrone; Kausar Mohammed; Raini Rodriguez; Kiersten Kelly
- Theme music composer: John Williams
- Composer: Leo Birenberg
- Country of origin: United States
- Original language: English
- No. of seasons: 4
- No. of episodes: 39

Production
- Executive producers: Aaron Hammersley; Scott Kreamer; Steven Spielberg; Colin Trevorrow; Frank Marshall
- Running time: 21–25 minutes
- Production companies: Amblin Entertainment; Universal Television; DreamWorks Animation Television

Original release
- Network: Netflix
- Release: May 24, 2024 – November 20, 2025

Related
- Jurassic World Camp Cretaceous

Jurassic World: Chaos Theory is an American animated science fiction television series developed by Scott Kreamer and Zack Stentz for Netflix. Produced by Amblin Entertainment, Universal Television, and DreamWorks Animation Television, it is the second television series in the Jurassic Park franchise. It serves as a direct sequel to Jurassic World Camp Cretaceous (2020–2022), and takes place both before and during the events of Jurassic World Dominion (2022). Aaron Hammersley and Kreamer serve as showrunners and executive produce the series along with Steven Spielberg, Colin Trevorrow, and Frank Marshall. It features Paul-Mikél Williams, Sean Giambrone, Kausar Mohammed, and Raini Rodriguez reprising their voice roles from Camp Cretaceous, with Darren Barnet and Kiersten Kelly joining the main cast.

The first season premiered on May 24, 2024, followed by a second season on October 17, 2024, and a third season on April 3, 2025. The fourth and final season premiered on November 20, 2025.

== Premise ==
Six years after the events of Jurassic World Camp Cretaceous, "the Nublar Six" reunite and embark on an adventure to unravel a global conspiracy that threatens dinosaurs and humankind alike while learning the truth about what happened to one of their own.

== Voice cast and characters ==
=== Main ===
- Paul-Mikél Williams as Darius Bowman, a member of the Nublar Six and a dinosaur fanatic who aids the Department of Prehistoric Wildlife (DPW) in capturing and protecting dinosaurs
- Darren Barnet as Kenji Kon, a member of the Nublar Six and Darius' adoptive brother, who is a skilled climbing instructor. Barnet replaces Ryan Potter who previously voiced the character on Camp Cretaceous.
- Sean Giambrone as Ben Pincus, a member of the Nublar Six who became a conspiracy theorist after discovering that his friends are in danger and attempts to bring them back together
- Kausar Mohammed as Yasmina "Yaz" Fadoula, a member of the Nublar Six who is recovering from severe PTSD while attending college following her encounters with dinosaurs on Isla Nublar
- Raini Rodriguez as Sammy Gutierrez, a member of the Nublar Six and Yaz's girlfriend who runs her family's ranch
- Kiersten Kelly as Brooklynn (seasons 2–4; recurring season 1), a member of the Nublar Six and Kenji's ex-girlfriend who is presumed to have been killed by an Allosaurus under suspicious circumstances while conducting an investigation, but is later revealed to have survived after losing her left forearm. Kelly replaces Jenna Ortega who previously voiced the character on Camp Cretaceous.

=== Recurring ===
- Sumalee Montano as The Handler (seasons 1, 3; guest season 2), a silent woman hired to hunt the Nublar Six using a group of Atrociraptors under her control
- Eugene Cordero as Mateo (season 1), a DPW truck driver who aids the Nublar Six
- Steve Blum as Jensen (season 1; guest season 2), a corrupt DPW officer who illegally transports dinosaurs to sell on the black market
  - Blum also voices Carl (guest season 1), Sammy's ill-tempered neighbor, who has a strong hatred for dinosaurs
- Philip Anthony-Rodriguez as Dudley Cabrera (season 1), a corrupt DPW regional director
- Carmen Moore as Ronnie (season 2; guest season 1), a DPW sergeant, paleo-vet, and Darius' former boss
- Anaiya Asomugha as Zayna Mballo (season 2), a teenage girl who lives on a rice farm with her parents in Senegal
- Cherise Boothe as Aminata Mballo (season 2), Zayna's mother, who runs their family farm
  - Boothe also voices Dr. Munnerlyn (guest season 4), a Biosyn scientist who works with Dr. Samuelson to train Atrociraptors
- Dichen Lachman as Soyona Santos / The Broker (seasons 2–3), the leader of an international dinosaur trafficking ring who runs black market operations that involve cloning and weaponizing dinosaurs. Lachman reprises her role from Jurassic World Dominion.
- Evan Michael Lee as Barry Sembène (season 3), a French Intelligence agent and former Velociraptor trainer at Jurassic World who is seeking to take down Santos. Sembène was previously portrayed by Omar Sy in both Jurassic World and Jurassic World Dominion.
- Beatrice Grannò as Gia (season 3; guest season 4), Ben's long-distance Italian girlfriend and a paleontologist student who lives with her grandmother in northern Italy
- Isabella Rossellini as Nonna (season 3), Gia's superstitious but kind-hearted grandmother
- Marwan Salama as Davi (season 3), an amateur undercover journalist investigating Biosyn in Malta
- Adam Harrington as Lewis Dodgson (season 4; guest season 3), the CEO of Biosyn, a genetics company with a remote research facility in the Dolomite Mountains in Italy. Harrington reprises his role from Camp Cretaceous. Dodgson was previously portrayed by Cameron Thor in Jurassic Park and Campbell Scott in Jurassic World Dominion
  - Harrington also voices Dustin (guest season 4), a medic working for Biosyn alongside Sirena

=== Guest ===
- Benjamin Flores Jr. as Brandon Bowman (season 1), Darius' older brother. Flores reprises his role from Camp Cretaceous.
- Alan Trinca as Mike (season 1), a DPW trainee and Ronnie's partner
- Brock Powell as Mo (season 1), a gas station attendant in Texas
- Andrew Kishino as Daniel Kon (seasons 1–2), Kenji's estranged father and the former president of Mantah Corp, who was placed under house arrest after the Nublar Six exposed him. Kishino reprises his role from Camp Cretaceous.
- Luis Bermudez as Bobby Nublar (season 1), the proprietor of a dinosaur-themed roadside attraction
- Chris Jai Alex as Jared (season 1), a corrupt DPW officer working with Jensen
- Stephen Fu as Captain Lang (season 2), the captain of a cargo ship who smuggles dinosaurs out of North America for the Broker
- Gideon Emery as Sullivan (season 2), the first mate onboard Lang's ship
- Skyler Gisondo as Earnest (seasons 2, 4), the leader of Dinosaur Liberation Now (DLN), a group of vigilantes who set captive dinosaurs free. He later reappears as a Biosyn employee.
- Samba Schutte as Ousmane Mballo (season 2), Zayna's father, who works away from his family's farm
- Ike Amadi as Dr. Sarr (season 2), the head of a secret dinosaur cloning facility in Senegal who works for the Broker
- Sendhil Ramamurthy as Chuck Desai (season 3), Ben and Gia's former university professor and an advisor to the UN
  - Ramamurthy also voices Dr. Samuelson (season 4), a Biosyn scientist who works with Dr. Munnerlyn to train Atrociraptors
- Peter Arpesella as Vito (season 3), a resident of a small town in northern Italy
- Sean Rohani as Rio (season 3), a dinosaur smuggler based in an underground black market in Malta
- Greg Chun as Dr. Henry Wu (season 4), the chief geneticist at Biosyn who previously worked for InGen at Jurassic World. Chun reprises his role from Camp Cretaceous. Wu was previously portrayed by BD Wong in multiple films beginning with Jurassic Park.
- Sirena Irwin as Sirena (season 4), a medic working for Biosyn alongside Dustin. Irwin also serves as the voice director for the series.
- Scott Kreamer as Mathias (season 4), the team leader of a group of Biosyn employees. Kreamer also serves as the co-creator and co-showrunner of the series.

Several notable creatures from Jurassic Park media make an appearance. This includes the blind-eyed Allosaurus from Battle at Big Rock who is responsible for Brooklynn's suspected death while the quartet of trained Atrociraptors Ghost, Panthera, Tiger, and Red as well as the Giganotosaurus and Therizinosaurus, are all from Jurassic World Dominion. It also includes Bumpy, Ben's Ankylosaurus companion with an asymmetrical face, and Big Eatie, a mother Tyrannosaurus rex from Mantah Corp Island, who were both introduced in Camp Cretaceous. Boss, a Carnotaurus from Jurassic World: Fallen Kingdom, the Tyrannosaurus rex Rexy from Jurassic Park, and both Buck and Doe from The Lost World: Jurassic Park, also make an appearance.

Other notable dinosaurs that appear include: Blonde and Brunette, a pair of Becklespinaxes transported by Jensen and Jared; Prue, Piper, and Phoebe, a Stygimoloch trio serving as a roadside attraction for Bobby Nublar; Major, a Majungasaurus held captive on Captain Lang's cargo ship; Geba, a playful Gallimimus who lives on the Mballo family farm; Gordon, a one-footed Compsognathus under Ronnie's care; a blind leucistic Baryonyx created by Dr. Sarr; a Pyroraptor escapee from Biosyn Valley; Smoothie, a baby Ankylosaurus under Kenji's protection who hatched from Bumpy's egg; Allan, Barbara, Kenneth, and Kristy, a pack of Dilophosaurus living in Biosyn Valley, and Blender, Bumpy's mate and Smoothie's father.

== Episodes ==
=== Series overview ===
Season	Episodes	Originally released
1	10	May 24, 2024
2	10	October 17, 2024
3	10	April 3, 2025
4	9	November 20, 2025

=== Season 1 (2024) ===
No. overall	No. in season	Title	Directed by	Written by	Original release date
1	1	"Aftershock"	Michael Mullen	Scott Kreamer	May 24, 2024
Six years following their escape from Isla Nublar, the Nublar Six have lost touch with one another after their friend Brooklynn was killed by a blind-eyed Allosaurus. In California, Darius Bowman feels guilty about Brooklynn's death and works with the Department of Prehistoric Wildlife (DPW) to find and capture dinosaurs in the area, specifying targeting the distinctive Allosaurus to lock it away. Darius helps his former boss, Ronnie, calm a Pachyrhinosaurus, but the Allosaurus attacks and is quickly driven off. Darius receives a call from his brother, Brandon Bowman, who is concerned that Darius is isolating himself and becoming obsessed with catching the Allosaurus. Darius then reminisces about when he and the rest of the Nublar Six were still together. Later that night at his cabin, Darius is visited by Ben Pincus, who speculates that Brooklynn's death was intentional after he obtained data from the Dark Jurassic online forum that made him believe in a potential conspiracy. Before Ben can elaborate further, the cabin's power is cut and a pack of Atrociraptors attack.
2	2	"Rest Stop"	Zesung Kang	Bethany Armstrong Johnson	May 24, 2024
Darius and Ben narrowly avoid the Atrociraptors and escape the cabin before fleeing the area in Ben's van. Now believing that they are being hunted, they decide to drive to Texas to warn Sammy Gutierrez of potential danger before finding the other remaining members of the Nublar Six. In a flashback, Ben gives Brooklynn a tour of his university campus, and she discusses her work as an investigative journalist. In the present, Ben becomes paranoid that they are being followed, so they soon stop at the gas station for supplies. They encounter a sleeping juvenile Nasutoceratops which soon awakens and becomes trapped in the gas station piping. Hoping to avoid setting the entire station ablaze, Ben attempts to calm the juvenile. After a herd of adult Nasutoceratops arrives, the juvenile breaks out of the piping to join them, which starts a fire, but Ben quickly extinguishes it. Thankful for saving the station, the gas station attendant gives the duo free supplies before they set off to continue their journey, but they are oblivious to a car discreetly following them.
3	3	"Down on the Ranch"	Dan Forgione; Zesung Kang	Travis Gunn	May 24, 2024
Darius and Ben arrive at Sammy's family ranch to reunite with their friend. Sammy leads them to a nearby field so Ben can see his Ankylosaurus companion Bumpy, who was moved to the ranch from Mantah Corp Island. Sammy's neighbor soon arrives to complain about Bumpy breaking his fences, but is accosted by Ben before leaving. Darius and Ben then explain to Sammy their concerns about someone hunting them, and they make plans to visit Kenji Kon, despite Darius' reservations due to them not being on speaking terms. The power to the ranch is suddenly cut, and while checking the breaker box, Darius and Ben discover that Sammy's neighbor has been killed. The pack of Atrociraptors attacks the ranch, and Ben frees Bumpy from her pen, who fights off the raptors. Sammy retrieves a map from Brooklynn's jacket that was left at the ranch when they last spoke, and she joins Darius and Ben in the van before they drive away. An unseen figure later arrives at the ranch and uses a whistle to direct the raptors into an animal trailer before leaving.
4	4	"Brothers"	Michael Mullen	Sara Karimipour	May 24, 2024
During their journey to Colorado to reunite with Kenji, the trio witnesses the DPW transporting the blind-eyed Allosaurus, causing Darius to relive the events surrounding Brooklynn's death. They soon arrive at Kenji's trailer, where Kenji happily greets Ben and Sammy but refuses to speak with Darius, whom he blames for Brooklyn's death. They try to warn Kenji about the danger they are in, and he notes that a location marked on Brooklynn's map is where his father, Daniel Kon, is under house arrest. Sammy tries to call her girlfriend Yasmina "Yaz" Fadoula, but is unable to get through. After expressing concern about the difficulties of her long-distance relationship, Ben agrees to take Sammy to find Yaz in his van. Darius and Kenji are left alone, and Kenji quickly climbs up a cliff to avoid him. In a flashback, Kenji ends his relationship with Brooklynn as she was not mentally present during their time together and had become fixated on her investigation. In the present, Darius reaches the top of the cliff and confesses to Kenji his guilt about not being there for Brooklynn. Reluctantly, Kenji decides to visit his father to find out why Brooklynn met with him. Meanwhile, the DPW manages to capture Bumpy.
5	5	"Halfway Home"	Robert Briggs; Zesung Kang	Nick "Rocket" Rodriguez	May 24, 2024
Ben and Sammy take a break during their journey to reach Yaz and witness three Stygimolochs being mistreated by the proprietor of a roadside attraction. They manage to free the Stygimolochs but are caught by the proprietor, and the dinosaurs wreak havoc. After Ben and Sammy flee the area, having recognized them as members of the Nublar Six, the proprietor reports them to his contact. Darius and Kenji arrive at the halfway house where Daniel is confined, and Kenji accuses him of being responsible for Brooklynn's death. While speaking with his son in private, Daniel attempts to persuade Kenji to help revive his company, Mantah Corp, but Kenji sees through his deception and declines. Before Kenji can leave, Daniel relents and confesses that Brooklynn visited him, asking for information about the dinosaur black market so she could get involved in the smuggling of dinosaurs. A woman known as the Handler soon arrives and commands the pack of Atrociraptors to attack. Daniel tackles one of the raptors to allow Darius and Kenji to flee, but is killed in the process. A stranger then rescues the duo before fleeing the area.
6	6	"Free Fall"	Dan Forgione	Travis Gunn	May 24, 2024
In a flashback, Brooklynn helps convince Yaz to work on her dinosaur-induced PTSD by attending college and taking dinosaur immersion therapy. In the present, Sammy manages to finally call Yaz, who is hesitant about seeing her. Ben and Sammy soon arrive at the island sanctuary in Wyoming, where Yaz is attending college. They attempt to convince Yaz to leave with them due to the danger they are in, but she declines due to the island being a dinosaur-free zone, and shows them the hologram simulations she is working on as part of developing new dinosaur immersion therapy techniques. Sammy expresses her frustrations with Yaz not returning her calls, and Yaz becomes upset due to Sammy treating her like a child because of her PTSD. Sammy storms off to leave on her own, but the island's defenses are suddenly taken offline. A pair of Becklespinax attack the campus, and Ben and Yaz quickly flee in Ben's van and pick up Sammy while the dinosaurs pursue them. After reaching a bridge, two DPW officers arrive and shoot the van's tires, allowing a Becklespinax to push it off the bridge and into the water below.
7	7	"That Night"	Michael Mullen	Sara Karimipour	May 24, 2024
Submerged underwater, Ben, Yaz, and Sammy escape the sinking van, but their phones become damaged. The trio witnesses the DPW officers, Jensen and Jared, leading the Becklespinax into a truck for transportation, and they sneak on board. As Kenji grieves his father, Darius recognizes the man who saved them as Mateo, who was at the scene the night Brooklynn died. Mateo admits that he was a DPW truck driver who transported the blind-eyed Allosaurus and delivered the dinosaur to a marked location, but it was remotely set free and attacked Brooklynn while Mateo cowered in fear. Feeling guilty about the incident, Mateo gives Darius Brooklynn's phone, which he took from the scene. Darius and Kenji unlock the phone and discover that Brooklynn had a secret apartment, which Mateo takes them to before departing. They investigate and find that Brooklynn had been keeping track of the DPW's operations using the Dark Jurassic forum. After discovering a duffel bag full of Daniel's money, Darius and Kenji believe that Brooklynn was intent on purchasing a dinosaur from the black market and leave the apartment to head to a nearby DPW drop point.
8	8	"The Drop"	Robert Briggs; Zesung Kang	Nick "Rocket" Rodriguez	May 24, 2024
Darius and Kenji reach the drop point and begin waiting. Darius becomes defensive when Kenji wants to listen to the dozens of voicemails left on Brooklynn's phone, only to discover that Darius sent them all. Darius admits that he had secret feelings for Brooklynn when she stayed at his cabin following her breakup with Kenji. They watch an unsent video taken moments before the Allosaurus attack, during which Brooklynn was saddened that Darius never showed up. Darius admits that he felt guilty after avoiding Brooklynn when she did not reciprocate his feelings. A DPW truck driver soon arrives, and the duo witnesses a Baryonyx being exchanged and start following it from a distance. Still hiding in the back of Jensen's truck, Ben, Yaz, and Sammy arrive at a DPW base. They discover that the regional director, Dudley Cabrera, is secretly working with the smugglers, but is unaware why Jensen and Jared were sent to kill them. The trio attempts to escape but finds Bumpy locked up. Yaz and Sammy are pursued by Jared until he crashes his car and is killed by a Becklespinax. They then witness Ben sneaking onto the truck carrying Bumpy before it drives away.
9	9	"Into the Fog"	Dan Forgione	Annie Arjarasumpun	May 24, 2024
Yaz and Sammy follow the truck carrying Ben and Bumpy from a distance until it reaches a large loading dock used to ship dinosaurs illegally. Darius and Kenji also arrive and discover Big Eatie, a Tyrannosaurus rex from Mantah Corp Island, being held captive. Darius frees a Pachyrhinosaurus to cause a distraction so he and Kenji can sneak inside a large warehouse, which inadvertently allows Yaz and Sammy to do the same. The container containing Bumpy is loaded into the warehouse, and Ben discovers that she has become unwell and refuses to move. Darius and Kenji reunite with Yaz and Sammy while Ben avoids being detected by Jensen. Darius discovers the blind-eyed Allosaurus in one of the containers, and Kenji concludes that Brooklynn was planning to purchase it with Daniel's money. They run into Ben, who had grown increasingly concerned about Bumpy's condition and believes that she is dying. After breaking into Bumpy's container, Ben and Sammy attempt to calm Bumpy down as she becomes increasingly unsettled, only for her to lay an egg. Bumpy begins to calm down as everyone celebrates the birth, but Cabrera arrives and corners them.
10	10	"The End of the Beginning"	Michael Mullen	Bethany Armstrong Johnson	May 24, 2024
Cabrera reveals that he sent the Allosaurus to scare Brooklynn and stop her investigation into the dinosaur smuggling operation, but that her death was not intentional. The Handler arrives with her pack of Atrociraptors and the Nublar Six learn that the Handler's boss, known as the Broker, is who ordered their deaths. After Jensen is also revealed to be working for the Broker, the Handler commands her raptors to kill Cabrera. She then discovers that the Nublar Six are hiding in the warehouse, but Mateo crashes through the door and rescues them. In the chaos, several dinosaurs are released, including Big Eatie, who fend off the raptors while Darius frees the Allosaurus to help. Jensen delivers a case containing Bumpy's egg to a cargo ship, but as he attempts to call the Broker, he is killed by the Allosaurus. With the authorities arriving and her raptors injured, the Handler decides to retreat. Mateo stays behind to inform the authorities of what transpired while the Nublar Six board the departing cargo ship full of dinosaurs. Sometime later, Ronnie sends an article on Cabrera's death to Brooklynn, who is still alive and continuing her investigation, albeit missing her left forearm.

=== Season 2 (2024) ===
No. overall	No. in season	Title	Directed by	Written by	Original release date
11	1	"Batten Down the Hatches"	Robert Briggs	Nick "Rocket" Rodriguez	October 17, 2024
The Nublar Six remain hidden in a makeshift cabin on the cargo ship, having spent over a week at sea. Kenji acts distant from the others and sneaks onto the bridge. He learns from a news broadcast that Cabrera's involvement in dinosaur smuggling led to the DPW being disbanded and overhears that Lang, the ship's captain, is heading into a storm despite only having a skeleton crew. The Nublar Six are soon discovered, but Lang allows them to help. Kenji and Yaz find the case containing Bumpy's egg, but lightning strikes the ship, starting a fire which Kenji charges into to retrieve the case. Several containers are opened by the storm, freeing a Majungasaurus that had cannibalized another. It begins stalking Darius and Lang until Darius uses himself as bait to lead it into a container. The case is knocked overboard, and Kenji recklessly jumps after it. Lang allows the Nublar Six to take a lifeboat to retrieve Kenji and the case. The following morning, Ben uses Brooklynn's phone to watch a video on the Dark Jurassic forum from the vigilante group Dinosaur Liberation Now (DLN) and notices Brooklynn in the background before the phone runs out of power.
12	2	"The Marooned Five"	Dan Forgione	Travis Gunn	October 17, 2024
On the mainland, teenager Zayna Mballo and her mother Aminata Mballo work on their family farm until Zayna leaves to feed her pet Gallimimus Geba. The Nublar Six reach land and leave the lifeboat only to discover that dinosaurs are in Africa, despite having been previously found only in North America. While Ben heads off to try and get a signal on Brooklynn's phone, Darius and Kenji hide the case of eggs and lead a herd of Stegosaurus away from the Mballo farm while Yaz and Sammy greet Aminata and learn they are in Senegal. Zayna runs into Darius and Kenji, who together return to the farm to find a Suchomimus that was kept away by the Stegosaurus until Darius and Kenji moved them. The Nublar Six work together to distract the Suchomimus, with Kenji putting himself in danger to do so. Zayna and Aminata retrieve the Stegosaurus and lead them back to the farm to drive the Suchomimus away. After climbing a tree to get a signal, Ben verifies Brooklynn's identity in the DLN video but withholds this information from the others when he returns to the farm.
13	3	"C13v3rGr186"	Michael Mullen	Peter Lee	October 17, 2024
In a series of flashbacks, Brooklynn works with Dark Jurassic user "C13v3rGr186" to investigate the dinosaur smuggling operation. She meets with Daniel but learns he is not involved, although he expresses interest in working together. Brooklynn's absence from Kenji's life leads to their breakup, and that night, she receives the bag of money from Daniel. She then goes to California to stay with Darius and receives the location of a DPW drop point from "C13v3rGr186" before asking Darius to meet her there. Darius accidentally confesses his feelings for Brooklynn, but she rejects him. That night, Brooklynn waits at the drop point and learns from "C13v3rGr186" that their account was hacked. The blind-eyed Allosaurus chases Brooklynn, who runs into the Handler and loses her left forearm to the Atrociraptor Ghost. Having been saved by Ronnie, Brooklynn later awakens in her home and learns she is "C13v3rGr186". Brooklynn allows the world to believe she is dead while recovering, and learns that Darius quit the DPW in grief. Brooklynn plans to reveal her survival to her friends and family, but changes her mind after hiding from Jensen when he breaks into Ronnie's home. Ronnie later returns home to find that Brooklynn has left.
14	4	"The Adjustment"	Robert Briggs	Sara Karimipour	October 17, 2024
Sometime after leaving California, Brooklynn aids the DLN under the alias of "Sydney" and works alongside its leader, Earnest, to raid dinosaur farms. She remains in contact with Ronnie, and they discover that the farms are frequented by the same plane originating from Dubai. During another raid, Earnest is discovered by some workers and tries to get rid of them, but Brooklynn intervenes and rescues the workers, allowing them to escape. Brooklynn convinces Earnest that they should continue the DLN's work overseas in Dubai, but after he arranges a boat for them, she instead cuts contact with him and leaves alone. The Nublar Six prepare to leave the Mballo farm and head upriver to find where the dinosaurs are coming from. Aminata tries to convince Zayna to join them since she never leaves the farm, which will allow her to visit her father. As Ben gathers supplies from the abandoned lifeboat, he discovers a hidden tracker. While gathering fruit for their journey, Yaz witnesses Geba being poached, and Kenji is knocked out while the case of eggs is stolen. With a newfound determination to rescue Geba, Zayna agrees to join the Nublar Six on their journey.
15	5	"Troubled Waters"	Dan Forgione	Nick "Rocket" Rodriguez	October 17, 2024
The Nublar Six and Zayna begin their journey downriver in two separate boats. Ben remains distracted while monitoring the Dark Jurassic forum after messaging the user "3sth3r St0ne," whom he believes is Brooklynn. They soon find a herd of Brachiosaurus which become spooked and Kenji recklessly puts himself in danger to retrieve a flare gun to lead the dinosaurs away. Yaz and Darius discuss Kenji's impulsive actions and his refusal to deal with the recent losses of Brooklynn and his father. Now in Dubai, Brooklynn monitors a person she believes is the Broker and contemplates replying to Ben. She sneaks into her target's apartment and is confronted by its occupant, Soyona Santos, who asks Brooklynn to stay so she can paint her portrait. Santos summons the Atrociraptor Red to torment Brooklynn before revealing her knowledge of Brooklynn's identity and her plan to deal with the Nublar Six for disrupting her operations. Realizing that Santos is indeed the Broker, Brooklynn fights back and narrowly escapes Red using an elevator. She calls Ben to warn him not to tell anyone she is alive and to stay away from the Broker before deleting her Dark Jurassic account so she cannot be contacted.
16	6	"Up the River"	Michael Mullen	Annie Arjarasumpun	October 17, 2024
The Nublar Six and Zayna continue their journey, but are followed by a hippopotamus which becomes enraged and attacks. Kenji puts himself in danger to drive off the hippo, but Yaz stops him, and the hippo swallows Brooklynn's phone while damaging both boats. Zayna brings them to a riverside restaurant that her father, Ousmane Mballo, frequented only to find it empty. After calling her father, he mentions that a carnivorous dinosaur is in the area. Ben acts paranoid about needing Brooklynn's phone back while Sammy helps Zayna with her confidence, but finds the corpse of one of Lang's crewmembers before a Suchomimus attacks. Darius and Kenji get separated from the others while the hippo returns and charges Yaz. The Suchomimus and hippo soon attack each other, allowing Darius and Kenji to flee, although Kenji dislocates his shoulder, and they unknowingly leave Yaz behind, who gets knocked unconscious. Brooklynn destroys evidence of her investigation and blocks contact with Ronnie to protect her. She then breaks back into Santos' apartment to confront her directly and proposes that they work together. Although hesitant to believe Brooklynn's sincerity, Santos requests that Brooklynn prove herself by joining her in Senegal.
17	7	"All Night Long"	Robert Briggs	Travis Gunn	October 17, 2024
Yaz awakens at the riverside restaurant to find the Suchomimus feasting on the hippopotamus. After the dinosaur goes to sleep, she sneaks around it to retrieve a flashlight before climbing a tree. Yaz then turns on the flashlight, which spooks a flock of Dimorphodons, waking up the Suchomimus, which begins hunting her. Yaz tries to sneak away with a new boat, but the dinosaur destroys it while Yaz escapes across the river, where she watches the Majungasaurus from the cargo ship kill a lion before it gives chase. Further downriver, Sammy becomes desperate about finding Yaz and lashes out at Zayna, who demands they stay on the water where it is safer. The flock of Dimorphodons attacks the boats until a pride of lions kills one, and Sammy apologizes to Zayna. They soon find Yaz, but both the Majungasaurus and the Suchomimus arrive and fight each other, giving the Nublar Six and Zayna time to escape on the boats as the Majungasaurus kills the other dinosaur. They find debris from the cargo ship and begin to follow it. Meanwhile, Brooklynn tries to call Ben and warn him about Santos' impending arrival before leaving Dubai with her.
18	8	"Lab Partners: Part 1"	Dan Forgione	Sara Karimipour	October 17, 2024
The Nublar Six and Zayna leave the river and find an abandoned chicken farm. They discover a pair of chained-up Monolophosaurus, and Kenji needlessly charges at them until Yaz stops him. The dinosaurs soon break free, causing Ben and Kenji to be separated from the others. Both groups escape the Monolophosaurus and find separate entrances to a secret underground facility. Darius' group finds several dinosaur incubators and realizes that the Broker is also cloning dinosaurs. They are soon interrupted by Lang running toward them with the Atrociraptor Red in pursuit, which kills him while Darius' group climbs into an arena to hide. A blind leucistic Baryonyx with a hyperacute sense of hearing enters the arena before a container containing Geba is also lowered. Yaz, Sammy, and Zayna get inside, but as the container is raised, Darius falls back down. Ben and Kenji find themselves on separate sides of an observation room. Brooklynn enters on Ben's side and admonishes him for being at the facility before leaving with the case of eggs. Kenji witnesses the exchange from the other side of a one-way mirror and becomes angry when he realizes that Ben already knew that Brooklynn is alive.
19	9	"Lab Partners: Part 2"	Michael Mullen	Peter Lee	October 17, 2024
Brooklynn and Santos arrive in Senegal and drive to the abandoned chicken farm. They find Lang outside, who recounts how he lost his crew transporting dinosaurs to the facility. They soon meet Dr. Sarr, who details cloning new dinosaurs from those smuggled from North America, while Brooklynn takes secret photos as evidence. For his failure to deal with the Nublar Six, Santos commands Red to kill Lang. Brooklynn sneaks off and finds the security room where she lowers Geba's container into the arena before raising it again, saving her friends. She then rejoins Santos, inadvertently allowing Darius, Yaz, and Sammy to learn of her survival. Santos considers the military applications of the leucistic Baryonyx before Sarr admits to having fed the facility's staff to the dinosaur to hone its skills. Sarr attempts to push Santos into the arena, but Brooklynn saves her, causing Sarr to fall in and flee. Brooklynn earns Santos' trust and retrieves the case of eggs, but informs Ben of her plan to expose the entire operation. As Brooklynn returns to Santos, she remarks that the facility will be destroyed to cover her tracks.
20	10	"Reunion"	Robert Briggs	Bethany Armstrong Johnson	October 17, 2024
Having learned that Brooklynn is still alive, Kenji lashes out at Ben for hiding the truth, while Darius' group also comes to terms with Brooklynn's survival. Brooklynn and Santos are confronted by Dr. Sarr, who controls the leucistic Baryonyx by simply clicking his fingers. Santos commands Red to kill Sarr, but Red communicates with the Baryonyx by mimicking its clicking, turning it against Sarr, and together they kill him. After reaching the security room, Santos discovers that the Nublar Six are inside the facility and turns off the power. The Baryonyx uses echolocation to find the Nublar Six and corners them. Santos recalls Red and Brooklynn activates an alarm, allowing her friends to escape. Brooklynn and Santos drive away from the facility and detonate it, killing the Baryonyx and anything still inside. Ben and Kenji chase them down, while Ousmane spots the explosion and picks up the rest. The Nublar Six say goodbye to Zayna while Santos informs Brooklynn that she has struck a deal with the genetics organization Biosyn. The Nublar Six catch up to Brooklynn and ask her to stay, but she sternly declines and gives them Bumpy's egg before boarding Santos' plane and leaving with her.

=== Season 3 (2025) ===
No. overall	No. in season	Title	Directed by	Written by	Original release date
21	1	"Excess Baggage"	Dan Forgione	Nick "Rocket" Rodriguez	April 3, 2025
At Delaney University in the United States, the Handler confronts Professor Chuck Desai on Santos' orders. Now in possession of Bumpy's egg, the Nublar Six remain shocked by Brooklynn's actions as they watch her leave in Santos' plane. They are soon interrupted by the arrival of a vehicle transporting a Kentrosaurus which is loaded onto a cargo plane piloted by the French Intelligence agent Barry Sembène, who Darius recognizes as a former Velociraptor trainer from Jurassic World. Barry allows the Nublar Six to join him on a flight to Munich, and the Nublar Six argue about Brooklynn's apparent betrayal and whether Barry can be trusted. When the Kentrosaurus stops breathing, Sammy manages to save it by injecting it with a dose of adrenaline, causing the dinosaur to become erratic and puncture the plane's fuselage. Sammy then tranquilizes the Kentrosaurus while Kenji stabilizes the plane before they crash in the Dolomite Mountains. Fearing that Barry will arrest them, the Nublar Six sneak away and plan to regroup at Ben's girlfriend's house in northern Italy. After returning to Dubai, Santos gifts Brooklynn a mechanical prosthetic arm.
22	2	"Villa Paradiso"	Michael Mullen	Travis Gunn	April 3, 2025
Having acquired transportation, the Nublar Six arrive in a small Italian town where they meet Ben's girlfriend, Gia, who first met Ben while studying to be a paleontologist at university. The Nublar Six are forced to hide Bumpy's egg from Gia's grandmother, or "Nonna", due to her superstitions about dinosaurs, believing them to be a curse sent to punish humanity. When Kenji spends the night acting overly protective of the egg, Darius forces him to spend time away from it. While driving Gia's car to get food, they nearly crash after a feathered dinosaur attacks the vehicle and then retreats. Yaz discovers that the egg has hatched, but the baby dinosaur is missing, so she and the others start searching for it. Gia confesses to Ben that she keeps her studies secret from Nonna to avoid damaging their relationship. They then learn that Desai, their former university professor, has publicly endorsed Biosyn despite previously being strongly opposed to them. As Darius and Kenji return to Gia's home, they find the baby Ankylosaurus and name him Smoothie, but keep him hidden from Nonna. As Brooklynn prepares to leave for Malta with Santos, she tries on her prosthetic arm.
23	3	"The Queen's Court"	Robert Briggs	Annie Arjarasumpun	April 3, 2025
En route to Malta, Brooklynn questions Santos' decision to partner with Biosyn. The Nublar Six and Gia attempt to determine which feathered dinosaur Darius ran into, realizing that it is likely a new species and poses a threat to the locals. After arriving in Malta, Brooklynn and Santos reach an underground dinosaur black market funded by Biosyn and meet its CEO, Lewis Dodgson. Santos details her plans to control the entire dinosaur smuggling trade herself with Biosyn's support and gives Dodgson the case of dinosaur eggs. Brooklynn discreetly searches through Dodgson's files and sends Ben a voice message on the Dark Jurassic forum inquiring about Professor Desai. The Nublar Six question her motivations before sending a reply, but Brooklynn dismisses their concerns. She soon runs into the Handler, whom Santos chastises after attempting to have her Atrociraptors attack Brooklynn. Kenji accidentally reveals Smoothie's existence to Nonna, whose initial cold reception changes when Kenji admits how much Smoothie means to him. Kenji then briefly leaves the room, and Nonna takes Smoothie outside so he can relieve himself, but he runs away. Meanwhile, the feathered dinosaur kills a local man.
24	4	"Fire in the Piazza"	Dan Forgione	Sara Karimipour	April 3, 2025
Believing that Brooklynn needs their help, Yaz tries to convince the others, but they still find Brooklynn to be untrustworthy now that she is working with Santos. After learning that Smoothie is missing, they investigate the local piazza. Yaz and Sammy argue about whether to trust Brooklynn, with Sammy becoming upset that Yaz has not been supporting her. They soon find both Smoothie and the feathered dinosaur, a Pyroraptor, which Nonna tries to ward off while rescuing Smoothie. The Handler and her Atrociraptors appear and surround the Pyroraptor before herding it into a containment truck and departing. Her hatred of dinosaurs now behind her, Nonna reconciles with Gia. Darius realizes that the Handler is working with Biosyn and fears that Brooklynn could be in danger. Santos learns that Dodgson has gone behind her back and used the Handler to assassinate a regional counselor, allowing Biosyn to acquire land. Santos then meets with him, and Dodgson requests that she capture both Maisie Lockwood and an adolescent Velociraptor as part of their deal, (Note: As depicted in Jurassic World: Dominion (2022).) but Santos sends the poacher Rainn Delacourt instead of the Handler. Brooklynn convinces Santos she cannot trust Dodgson, so she sends Brooklynn to spy on Biosyn's black market.
25	5	"Boiling Over"	Michael Mullen	Nick "Rocket" Rodriguez	April 3, 2025
Gia discovers that Brooklynn is in Malta, but the Nublar Six remain conflicted about whether to help her. They call Brooklynn, who remains secretive and quickly hangs up, causing them to further argue about which course of action to take. Having realized that a man is stalking her, Brooklynn confronts him. Named Davi, he admits to recognizing Brooklynn from her time as a famous teen vlogger. She threatens Davi by overpowering him and offering his arm to a captive Lystrosaurus until he admits to being an undercover journalist attempting to expose Biosyn. Santos confronts the Handler about her having worked for Dodgson and confiscates her Atrociraptors as punishment, threatening to sell them. After calming down from their heated argument, and despite his reservations, Kenji encourages Darius to pursue Brooklynn. Gia tells Ben that while she cannot join him, Ben and his friends should help Brooklynn, before they reminisce about their first date. Yaz and Sammy remain argumentative, pointing out each other's flaws, and both admit that their relationship is no longer working before agreeing to break up. Meanwhile, the Pyroraptor escapes from its containment truck.
26	6	"Undercover"	Robert Briggs	Peter Lee	April 3, 2025
The Nublar Six plan to split up, with Darius, Ben, and Yaz going to Malta to help Brooklynn, while Kenji and Sammy will take Smoothie to the United States to be with his mother. Ben says goodbye to Gia and Nonna, but Yaz and Sammy remain estranged. Brooklynn films a video for Santos to showcase the Atrociraptors obedience for potential buyers, and notices Davi investigating the area. She tries to convince Davi to leave, explaining that she has been collecting her own evidence to expose Santos and her operation. Santos then interrupts them, and Brooklynn forces Davi to hide in one of the raptor cages while they talk. After being let out, Davi accuses Brooklynn of being corrupt and flees when she threatens him. Now in Malta, Darius, Ben, and Yaz find an entrance to the underground black market. They watch in horror as dinosaurs are abused and exploited, and quickly leave. The Handler goes to retrieve her Atrociraptors but realizes they have been relocated. Santos informs Brooklynn that she has sold the Atrociraptors to a buyer in Riyadh and has tasked the Handler with killing Davi. Feeling guilty, Brooklynn heads to the surface and waits for her friends.
27	7	"Decisions, Decisions..."	Dan Forgione	Travis Gunn	April 3, 2025
Brooklynn reunites with Darius, Ben, and Yaz but requests their help. While Brooklynn leaves to save Davi, she sends the others to stop Santos' plan to sell the Atrociraptors. Brooklynn finds Davi, but realizes that he has been lured there as part of a setup. The Handler soon confronts them, knocks out Davi, and Brooklynn tries to escape. The Handler catches up to her, ripping off Brooklynn's prosthetic arm and pinning her down until Brooklynn promises to take her to the Atrociraptors. Davi later awakens to see that both Brooklynn and the Handler have gone. Having found Barry's phone number on the Dark Jurassic forum, Ben calls him for help, and they agree to meet. As they prepare to depart, Kenji thanks Nonna for being supportive and helping him overcome his reckless behavior. Gia starts driving Kenji, Sammy, and Smoothie to the airport when they come across the crashed containment truck. Kenji and Sammy investigate the truck and retrieve a tablet computer before spotting a giant locust, which is quickly eaten by the Pyroraptor. After Kenji and Sammy sneak back to the car, the raptor investigates, but eventually leaves in the direction of the town.
28	8	"No Escape"	Michael Mullen	Sara Karimipour; Story by : Sara Karimipour and Nick "Rocket" Rodriguez	April 3, 2025
On their way back to town, Kenji, Sammy, and Gia search for the Pyroraptor before it can harm anyone. They stop the car after spotting one of its feathers, leading them to locate the dinosaur at an active ski slope and watch it burrow under the snow. Kenji and Sammy use a pair of snowmobiles to locate the Pyroraptor while Gia activates a speaker system to warn the skiers to evacuate the area. As Kenji and Sammy chase the raptor, it causes an avalanche, and they try to escape but become buried in snow. Darius, Ben, and Yaz run into Davi, who reports that Brooklynn is missing. They agree to work together and soon retrieve Brooklynn's prosthetic arm. Meanwhile, Barry gets in contact with Owen Grady and sets his own plan into motion. Brooklynn leads the Handler to the caged Atrociraptors already loaded onto a transport vehicle, and convinces her that by taking down Santos, they can free her raptors for good. They then hide behind the cages and witness Santos being ambushed by Barry and French Intelligence agents before captive dinosaurs from the black market suddenly break free, and the vehicle is toppled over.
29	9	"Active Pursuit"	Robert Briggs	Nick "Rocket" Rodriguez; Story by : Sara Karimipour and Nick "Rocket" Rodriguez	April 3, 2025
Gia searches through the snow for Kenji and Sammy until Smoothie manages to locate them. Sammy uses the tablet taken from the containment truck and discovers that Bumpy was recently transported to the nearby Biosyn Valley. Darius, Ben, Yaz, and Davi avoid a stampede of escaped dinosaurs, which knock over crates of giant locusts that begin swarming the area. After fleeing from an escaped Baryonyx, they deduce that Brooklynn was leading the Handler to her Atrociraptors and rush through the swarm to the destroyed black market. While hiding from an escaped Ceratosaurus, Ben discovers that Brooklynn's evidence was stored on a flash drive hidden in her prosthetic arm. A trapped Brooklynn witnesses Santos knock out Barry and make plans to leave the city. Brooklynn begs the Handler to help her, but she refuses, and Brooklynn manages to pry herself free moments later. Having reached the surface, Darius, Ben, Yaz, and Davi avoid numerous dinosaurs as they cause chaos in the city streets. They find a safe place to hide and look through Brooklynn's evidence, learning that Santos is planning to escape via helicopter. The Handler and Brooklynn separately chase Santos, who reaches her extraction point.
30	10	"Morituri Te Salutant" (Note: Latin for "Those Who Are About to Die Salute You")	Dan Forgione	Annie Arjarasumpun	April 3, 2025
Ben traces Barry's phone and leaves with Davi to retrieve him. Darius and Yaz use flares to corral the escaped dinosaurs and lead them underground to protect the vulnerable civilians. The Handler calls her Atrociraptors and reaches the extraction point, where she attacks Santos as the helicopter lands, but is overpowered by her. As Brooklynn joins Santos, she commands the Atrociraptor Red to kill the Handler, but it ultimately refuses, and all four raptors remain loyal to her. Santos then summons a Carnotaurus, which quickly kills the Atrociraptor Ghost. The Handler attempts to control the Carnotaurus herself but is killed, causing the remaining raptors to flee. When Darius and Yaz arrive, Brooklynn stalls Santos by trying to convince her to spare them, allowing Ben to tranquilize the Carnotaurus. Barry and French Intelligence agents arrest Santos, finally bringing her to justice, and Brooklynn discards her prosthetic arm before having a cheerful reunion with her friends. After thanking Davi and Barry for their help, Brooklynn, Darius, Ben, and Yaz leave in Santos' helicopter with plans to stop Biosyn. Meanwhile, Kenji, Sammy, and Smoothie reach the edge of Biosyn Valley and set off to search for Bumpy.

=== Season 4 (2025) ===
No. overall	No. in season	Title	Directed by	Written by	Original release date
31	1	"Arrival"	Michael Mullen	Bethany Armstrong Johnson	November 20, 2025
Arriving in Biosyn Valley via helicopter, Brooklynn, Darius, Ben, and Yaz are soon attacked by a Quetzalcoatlus, but the valley's aerial deterrent system activates in time to ward it off. The helicopter's autopilot forces them to land on the roof of Biosyn's underground headquarters, where Brooklynn is recognized by Earnest, the former leader of the DLN, who now works for Biosyn. Brooklynn convinces Earnest to help them, but Darius becomes jealous of their friendship and upset that Brooklynn easily manipulated him. Kenji, Sammy, and Smoothie enter the valley using Gia's car and reach the entrance gate. They quickly spot Dodgson, who releases the Tyrannosaurus rex Rexy so she can be integrated into the valley's ecosystem. Kenji confronts Dodgson under the guise of a business proposition so he can purchase Bumpy, but Dodgson refuses. Kenji then attempts to blackmail him by threatening to expose Biosyn to the media with information about the trained Atrociraptors and the escaped Pyroraptor. They are interrupted by the arrival of a Giganotosaurus that easily dominates Rexy, forcing her to leave. Dodgson reluctantly agrees to Kenji's proposition and takes him and Sammy underground.
32	2	"The Maze"	Robert Briggs	Travis Gunn; Sara Karimipour	November 20, 2025
Earnest sneaks Brooklynn's group into the headquarters but is unable to get them to the lower levels, so Brooklynn fakes an injury to get rid of Earnest and steals his RFID wristband to access an elevator. Darius confides in Ben about his suspicions regarding Brooklynn's selfish use of people for her own ends, while Brooklynn and Yaz discover an adolescent Atrociraptor being taken to a training facility. The group reaches the facility but must hide from two Biosyn scientists and overhear that Dr. Henry Wu is their superior. The scientists then use a laser designator to command raptors to navigate a maze, but the dinosaurs go rogue and work together to kill the scientists, allowing the group to escape. Dodgson brings Kenji and Sammy to the Hyperloop, a subway train system, and Sammy keeps Smoothie hidden in her backpack. After Dodgson departs, Kenji and Sammy board the Hyperloop, where Sammy reveals that she became estranged from her family when they agreed to work for Biosyn. They soon reach their destination and look for Bumpy but discover that Dodgson had tricked the pair by sending them to an area of the valley inhabited by Dilophosaurus.
33	3	"Familiar Faces"	Dan Forgione	Nick "Rocket" Rodriguez	November 20, 2025
Kenji and Sammy are surrounded by the Dilophosaurus but manage to slip away. Sammy tries to use her tablet to locate Bumpy, but discovers that it was smashed during their escape. They quickly get lost, and the Dilophosaurus tracks them down, so Kenji and Sammy hold them off to protect Smoothie. Brooklynn lashes out at the others when they criticize her actions, and they soon find Dr. Wu, who is searching for two escaped assets. The group confronts him, but they are surprised when Wu asks for their help to stop Biosyn and expresses his desire to make amends, revealing that Dodgson had twisted his original research that was meant for search and rescue training into weaponizing dinosaurs. While Wu deletes all the data from the main servers, he requests that the group delete the data from Biosyn's backup servers located in a research outpost on the far side of the valley. Leaving in Wu's car, they save Kenji and Sammy from the Dilophosaurus. With the Nublar Six finally reunited, Brooklynn is introduced to Smoothie, and they inform each other of their plans to find Bumpy and delete Biosyn's data. After setting off, the Giganotosaurus begins to follow them.
34	4	"Ctrl + F"	Michael Mullen	Annie Arjarasumpun	November 20, 2025
The Nublar Six arrive at a research outpost where Brooklynn apologizes to Darius for her actions, and Kenji spots a plane arriving in the valley. They search the outpost but find nothing, only to discover that there are several other outposts nearby. A small herd of Pachyrhinosaurus is then attacked by Rexy, forcing the Nublar Six to flee, but their car soon breaks down due to a flat tire. Brooklynn and Kenji work together to change the tire, and they have a heart-to-heart conversation about their past relationship and how they have changed since, but agree to stay separated, despite still caring for each other. The rest of the group finishes searching a nearby outpost, but the Giganotosaurus attacks and pursues them through the forest until they encounter Rexy. The two dinosaurs fight each other once again, allowing the Nublar Six to drive to the next outpost. They find Biosyn's backup servers and search them for information, while Yaz and Sammy begin to rekindle their bond. They discover numerous research logs showing Biosyn's cruel treatment of dinosaurs and delete the data before destroying the servers.
35	5	"Give & Take"	Robert Briggs	Travis Gunn	November 20, 2025
As they prepare to leave, the Nublar Six are attacked by a Quetzalcoatlus and forced to hide inside the outpost. Sammy searches for Bumpy's location and finds that she is located at an infirmary. Darius distracts the pterosaur while the rest escape, but as they leave in the car, the Quetzalcoatlus picks it up and drops it into a tree. Suspended in midair, Kenji remains calm and helps guide the others to climb up onto the roof of the car. Sammy panics due to a fear of heights and nearly falls to her death, but is quickly pulled to safety. After everyone climbs down to the ground, Sammy blames Brooklynn for their current situation and remains unable to trust her. The car then falls from the tree, triggering its alarm, drawing numerous stampeding dinosaurs to the Nublar Six's location. To save her friends, Brooklynn screams at the dinosaurs to distract them, and Ben saves her just in time before she is crushed. Brooklynn breaks down in tears, having believed that sacrificing herself was the only way to make amends with everyone for her past actions, but Ben is suddenly knocked down by a charging Stegosaurus.
36	6	"Fire"	Dan Forgione	Sara Karimipour	November 20, 2025
Everyone rushes to help Ben and discover that the Stegosaurus' thagomizer is impaled in his stomach, but they leave it in to stem the bleeding. Darius and Kenji help Ben walk as they all slowly start making their way towards the infirmary as night falls. A swarm of burning giant locusts begins spreading through the forest, setting ablaze everything in their path. The Nublar Six try to outpace the flames despite Ben's condition and encounter a blind Therizinosaurus that begins to pursue them. They reach the infirmary before the dinosaur can catch up and lock themselves inside. Ben's condition begins to worsen, but he remains adamant that they find Bumpy instead of helping him. Brooklynn and Sammy reconcile and start searching for Bumpy while Darius and Kenji look for medical supplies. Yaz stays to comfort Ben and praises him for reuniting the Nublar Six. The others soon return to Ben's side, bringing Bumpy and a limited amount of medical supplies with them. Bumpy is then introduced to Smoothie for the first time, and they quickly bond. Ben's mood improves seeing Bumpy finally meet her son, but everyone is startled when the infirmary's alarm suddenly turns on.
37	7	"How Strong We Are"	Michael Mullen	Nick "Rocket" Rodriguez	November 20, 2025
A warning sounds over the infirmary's loudspeaker, stating that a "remote herding" procedure had been initiated to guide many of the valley's dinosaurs to safety. Ben is patched up but remains in too much pain to move on his own. Yaz and Sammy volunteer to lead Bumpy and Smoothie to safety, while Kenji stays with Ben. Brooklynn and Darius start searching for transportation, and Brooklynn blames herself for Ben's condition, but Darius encourages her not to give up. They reach the headquarters, where they find Earnest, who was stranded due to Brooklynn stealing his wristband. Earnest devises a plan to evacuate everyone to an airfield using the Hyperloop, and Brooklynn apologizes for manipulating him before he departs with two other Biosyn employees. Darius calls Ben about their plan, but a group of Dilophosaurus enters the infirmary, leading Ben and Kenji to escape to an elevator. Kenji holds the dinosaurs back and sends Ben in the elevator alone to the Hyperloop station beneath the infirmary. Ben refuses to leave without Kenji, who arrives and boards the Hyperloop in time, but the power soon turns off across the entire valley.
38	8	"Lights Out"	Robert Briggs	Annie Arjarasumpun	November 20, 2025
With the Hyperloop stranded, the Dilophosaurus reaches Ben and Kenji, but Brooklynn resets the power so they can start moving again, although this reroutes the Hyperloop back to the headquarters. Darius then confesses his feelings for Brooklynn, explaining that he still loves her, but not in a romantic way like he had thought; She reciprocates. Yaz and Sammy lead Bumpy and Smoothie into a secure containment area and start navigating their way past the dozens of evacuated dinosaurs. After the larger dinosaurs nearly crush Smoothie, he is saved by another Ankylosaurus, who is revealed to be Smoothie's father. Feeling emotional at seeing the family together, Yaz and Sammy declare their love for each other and kiss. They bid farewell to Bumpy and her family and leave the containment area with Brooklynn's help. Ben begins to hallucinate as his situation becomes desperate, so he and Kenji disembark the Hyperloop to walk the rest of the way. Darius watches Dodgson enter the Hyperloop on a security feed before he is killed by the Dilophosaurus who were hunting Ben and Kenji. The Nublar Six soon reunite and attempt to evacuate on the same helicopter they arrived on, but they watch it leave without them. With no hope of escape, Ben struggles to breathe and passes out.
39	9	"Fare Well"	Dan Forgione	Bethany Armstrong Johnson	November 20, 2025
The Nublar Six get Ben to shelter as he slips in and out of consciousness and becomes delirious. After he mentions Gia, Kenji recalls that her car, which he and Sammy used to enter the valley, should still be at the entrance gate. Brooklynn and Kenji race off to retrieve the car, but a group of Atrociraptors smell Ben's fresh blood and attack. Darius fends off the raptors as everyone gets into the car and they head to the airfield, but the raptors follow closely behind. As Ben's condition continues to deteriorate, the car gets stuck in a patch of mud, and the raptors surround them. Rexy, Buck, and Doe (Note: Previously seen in The Lost World: Jurassic Park.) suddenly arrive and fight off the raptors, giving the Nublar Six time to escape and reach the airfield as the last helicopter prepares to leave. Ben and Kenji are flown to the hospital while the others stay behind to help the remaining Biosyn employees care for the many injured dinosaurs in the valley. Sometime later, Gia brings Ben to recover at Darius' cabin in California, where Kenji now lives. Darius has been helping with the dinosaurs in Biosyn Valley, where Bumpy's family has settled, with Brooklynn planning to join him. Yaz and Sammy are working with Dr. Wu and running a support group for farmers affected by the giant locusts, while both Sammy and Brooklynn have started reconnecting with their families.

== Production ==
=== Development ===
As Jurassic World Camp Cretaceous finished production, executives at DreamWorks Animation Television and Netflix were interested in developing a follow-up. While Camp Cretaceous showrunner Scott Kreamer initially turned down the offer, he decided to work on a second series after he and co-showrunner Aaron Hammersley were given "an early rundown" of the film Jurassic World Dominion (2022), which inspired him to create a direct sequel starring older versions of the Camp Cretaceous cast in the vein of the later Harry Potter films. After deciding to work on the series, they reunited with story editor Bethany Armstrong Johnson to conceive the story for the series.

In November 2023, at Netflix's Geeked Week virtual event, the follow-up series titled Jurassic World: Chaos Theory was announced. In June 2024, Netflix announced a second season of the series. In January 2025, Netflix announced a third season of the series. In June 2025, Netflix announced a fourth and final season of the series.

=== Writing ===
The series is set shortly before the events of Jurassic World Dominion. Kreamer was intrigued by the world depicted in the film, in which dinosaurs have established themselves on the mainland, and wanted to explore "what does that look like for an everyday person?" The producers also wanted to emphasize the characters now being older and "at that uncertain age where one is trying to figure out who they are and where they fit in the world," while facing their trauma, the proliferation of dinosaurs on the mainland, and a recent loss. The writers also made the show a conspiracy thriller in contrast to the more adventurous tone of Camp Cretaceous.

The series starts with the assumed death of Brooklynn, which the showrunners wrote into the story in response to criticism that Camp Cretaceous did not put its main characters in enough danger. The series introduces holographic immersion technology that serves as "a great way to expose people to their fears [of dinosaurs] without having to face them up close and personal". The main intention of including this aspect was to explore Yaz's post-traumatic stress disorder from her time on Isla Nublar and how she copes with it as dinosaurs enter the mainland. The showrunners also established Yaz as having studied psychology because they liked the idea of her using the immersion technology to "help herself and others".

=== Casting ===
In November 2023, alongside the announcement of the series, Paul-Mikél Williams was confirmed to reprise his role from Camp Cretaceous as Darius Bowman. In March 2024, it was announced that Sean Giambrone would reprise his role as Ben Pincus. In April, it was announced that Raini Rodriguez and Kausar Mohammed would be reprising their roles as Sammy Gutierrez and Yasmina "Yaz" Fadoula respectively, with Darren Barnet replacing Ryan Potter as Kenji Kon. The showrunners originally wanted Jenna Ortega to reprise her role as Brooklynn, but she was unable to commit due to scheduling issues and was replaced by Kiersten Kelly. Like Brooklynn, Kiersten Kelly has a limb difference, an intentional decision by the creators, who wanted to cast an actor with a limb difference so long as it did not interfere with performance quality.

Dichen Lachman, who previously portrayed Soyona Santos in Jurassic World Dominion, joined the cast and reprised her role for the second and third seasons. In March 2025, Isabella Rossellini, Beatrice Grannò, Sean Rohani, and Marwan Salama were announced to have joined the cast for the third season, while Adam Harrington was confirmed to reprise his role as Lewis Dodgson from Camp Cretaceous. In October 2025, Greg Chun was announced to reprise his role as Dr. Henry Wu from Camp Cretaceous for the fourth and final season.

=== Animation ===
Animation services were provided by CGCG in Taipei, Taiwan. Production on a single episode took place over 17 months, with 12 weeks of animation. Visual inspirations for the series include conspiracy thrillers such as The Parallax View and All the President's Men, seeking to "evoke a similar uneasy vibe, putting the main characters at a disadvantage as they try to figure out what's coming next before it's too late".

== Release ==
Jurassic World: Chaos Theory premiered on May 24, 2024, on Netflix. The second season premiered on October 17, 2024. The third season premiered on April 3, 2025. The fourth and final season premiered on November 20, 2025.

== Reception ==
=== Critical response ===
The review aggregator website Rotten Tomatoes reported a 100% approval rating with an average rating of 7.9/10, based on six critic reviews for the first season. Randy Myers of Mercury News gave the first season 3 out of 4 stars, noting that "Showrunners Scott Kreamer and Aaron Hammersley archive something the later Jurassic films lacked: giving us characters that are just as compelling as the action sequences." Felipe Rangel of Screen Rant complimented the series' increased stakes and greater focus on horror compared to its predecessor, but noted that the change in Brooklynn's voice actor was noticeable.

For the second season, Daniel Hart of Ready Steady Cut praised the writers' choice to make Brooklynn a complex character rather than returning to the Nublar Six's old status quo. For the third season, Danielle Solzman of Solzy At The Movies gave it a 4/5 score and applauded the additional lore given in the show that was excluded from the Jurassic World films. For the fourth season, Nicholas Brooks of CBR commended the intensity and focus on characters, but criticized its struggle to tie into the Jurassic franchise's films and the canonically-concurrent Jurassic World: Dominion.

=== Accolades ===
Award	Date of ceremony	Category	Recipient(s)	Result	Ref.
Annie Awards	February 8, 2025	Best Animated Television/Broadcast Production for Children	"Batten Down the Hatches"	Nominated	
Annie Awards	February 8, 2025	Outstanding Achievement for Editorial in an Animated Television / Broadcast Production	Ben Choo, Rich Liverance, Eric Hendricks, Anna Adams, and Ian Hurley (for "Batten Down the Hatches")	Nominated	
Annie Awards	February 8, 2025	Outstanding Achievement for Storyboarding in an Animated Television / Broadcast Production	Aevery Huens (for "That Night")	Nominated	
Astra TV Awards	December 8, 2024	Best Animated Series or TV Movie	Jurassic World: Chaos Theory	Nominated	
Astra TV Awards	December 8, 2024	Best Voice-Over Performance	Darren Barnet	Nominated	
1st Velma Awards	December 10, 2024	Best Queer Relationship That's Just a Plain Ol' Relationship	Jurassic World: Chaos Theory (Season 2)	Won	
Children's and Family Emmy Awards	March 15, 2025	Outstanding Casting for an Animated Program	Katie Galvan, Ania O'Hare, and Taylor Strait	Nominated	
Children's and Family Emmy Awards	March 15, 2025	Outstanding Sound Editing and Sound Mixing for an Animated Program	Adam Cioffi, Jeff Halbert, D.J. Lynch, Jacob Salerno, Rob McIntyre, Marc Schmidt, Iris Dutour, Sanaa Kelley, and Erika Koski	Nominated	
GLAAD Media Award	March 27, 2025	Outstanding Kids and Family Programming - Animated	Jurassic World: Chaos Theory	Won	
2nd Velma Awards	December 9, 2025	Best Queer Break Up, That's Just a Break Up	Jurassic World: Chaos Theory (for "Boiling Point")	Won	
Kidscreen Awards	February 22–25, 2026	Creative Talent and Performance - Best Directing	Jurassic World: Chaos Theory	Won	
Children's and Family Emmy Awards	March 1–2, 2026	Outstanding Sound Mixing and Sound Editing for an Animated Program	"Fire in the Piazza"	Nominated	

== See also ==
- List of films featuring dinosaurs
