= Demba (film) =

2024 Senegalese drama film

- Promotional poster
- Directed by: Mamadou Dia
- Screenplay by: Mamadou Dia
- Produced by: Maba Ba
- Starring: Ben Mahmoud Mbow; Awa Djiga Kane; Mamadou Sylla
- Cinematography: Sheldon Chau
- Edited by: Alan Wu
- Music by: John Corlis
- Production companies: NiKo Film; Joyedidi; Doha Film Institute
- Distributed by: The Party Film Sales
- Release date: 17 February 2024 (Berlinale)
- Running time: 119 minutes
- Countries: Senegal; Germany; Qatar
- Language: Fula

Demba is a 2024 Fula language drama film written and directed by Mamadou Dia. Starring Ben Mahmoud Mbow in titular role, the film follows a man struggling with grief and depression as the anniversary of his wife's death nears; but he finds solace in reconnecting with his estranged son.

The film had its world premiere at the Encounters section of the 74th Berlin International Film Festival, on 17 February 2024. It was selected as the Senegalese entry for Best International Feature Film at the 98th Academy Awards, but was not on the list of films accepted by the academy.

== Cast ==
- Ben Mahmoud Mbow as Demba
- Awa Djiga Kane as Awa
- Mamadou Sylla as Bajjo
- Aicha Talla as Oumy
- Abdoulaye Dicko as Mayor
- Saikou Lo as Salam
- Mamadou Bayo Sarr as Pekane
- Hamadi Baila as Rama

== Production ==
In October 2022, the film was selected to receive $25,000 prize for projects in development. It won Nouveau Marché award at the 2022 Festival du nouveau cinéma subsequently. In November 2022, the film was selected for the Atlas Workshops at the Marrakech International Film Festival and won Atlas Development Prize.

== Release ==
Demba had its world premiere on 17 February 2024, as part of the 74th Berlin International Film Festival, in Encounters.

The film was presented in Features section at the Vienna International Film Festival on 22 October 2024, and in the Virginia Film Festival on 1 November 2024 for its United States premiere.

== Reception ==
Vladan Petkovic of Cineuropa reviewing at the Berlin International Film Festival, presented a thoughtful review. Petkovic praised the film's emotional depth while noting its narrative challenges. He described the title character as "often unreasonably explosive and confrontational," yet clearly suffering from depression following the loss of his wife and job. He highlighted actor Mbow's performance as "a powerful presence," blending "despair, frenzy and anger" in a raw, naturalistic portrayal. Cinematographer Sheldon Chau's use of mirrors and windows visually reflects Demba's fractured mental state. Petkovic noted that as Demba's mental health worsens, "the story similarly gets harder to follow," with flashbacks and symbolic elements complicating the narrative.

Petkovic acknowledged director Dia's intention to immerse viewers in Demba's troubled psyche, writing, "If Dia's goal was to immerse us in the hero's painfully fractured inner world, he has certainly succeeded." However, he cautioned that the film's abstract storytelling might alienate some viewers, despite Mbow's compelling performance, for which he commented "Mbow is a compelling actor, and his dedicated portrayal of pain and anguish is a triumph."

Lee Marshall of Screen Daily described Demba as "a fever dream of a film," rich with themes but intentionally elusive. Reviewing its premiere at the Berlin International Film Festival, Marshall noted that writer-director Mamadou Dia "scatters a basketful of thematic crumbs," including ideas of displacement, shifting identities, and bureaucratic invisibility. He observed that the story extends beyond Demba’s personal grief, portraying an entire town in a ghostly, liminal state. Even Dakar, just a day’s drive away, feels like "a parallel universe." The film's surreal tone peaks during the Tajabone procession, a Senegalese twist on Ashura, where Demba and his son Bajjo wear female wigs in a symbolic moment of gender fluidity.

Marshall acknowledged the film's fragmented narrative, saying it "does not always make sense, perhaps partly because it’s not supposed to." Despite its Brechtian distance and temporal confusion, he found emotional depth in the handheld cinematography and evocative soundtrack, which together express "sympathy for a man undone by grief."

== Accolades ==
Award	Date of ceremony	Category	Recipient	Result	Ref.
Berlin International Film Festival	25 February 2024	Encounters Golden Bear Plaque for Best Film	Mamadou Dia	Nominated	

== See also ==
- List of submissions to the 98th Academy Awards for Best International Feature Film
- List of Senegalese submissions for the Academy Award for Best International Feature Film
