= Kausar Mohammed =

American actress

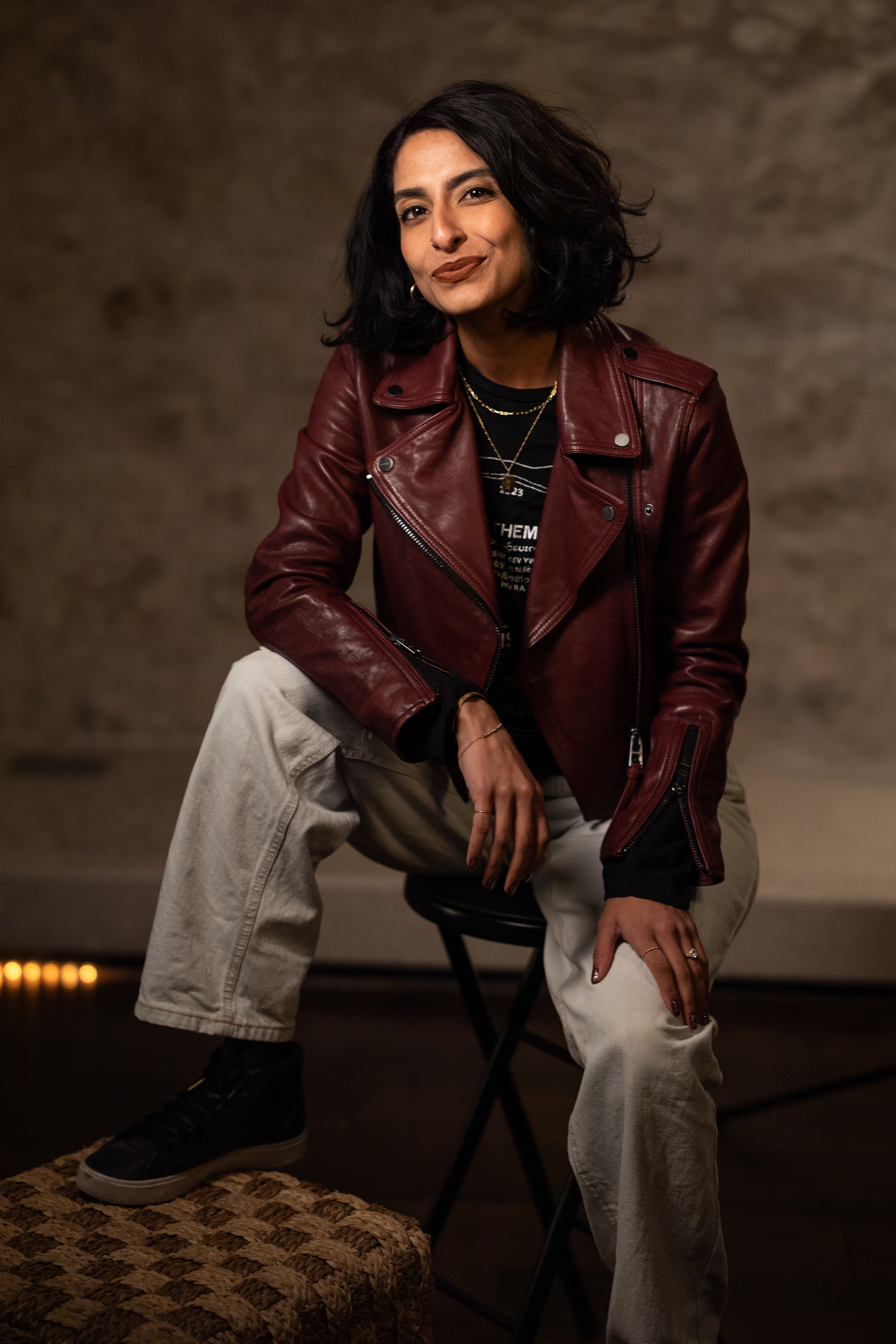
- Mohammed at SXSW 2024
- Born: San Jose, California, U.S.
- Occupations: Actress; comedian; writer
- Years active: 2012–present

Kausar Mohammed is an American actress, comedian, and writer. She is best known for her roles in East of La Brea, What Men Want, Little and voicing Yasmina 'Yaz' Fadoula in Netflix's Jurassic World Camp Cretaceous and Jurassic World: Chaos Theory.

== Life and career ==
Born in San Jose, California, Mohammed is of Bengali and Pakistani descent. She graduated from UCLA and was a member of the UCLA Spring Sing Company. She has worked on and written many digital projects, such as "Smyle" and "Namaste" featured on Huffington Post, and NBC. She is also California's Census Campaign Digital Ambassador.

Kausar also voices series lead characters on the anime show Great Pretender, and the Netflix animated series Jurassic World Camp Cretaceous.

In July 2022, Nickelodeon announced that Kausar would voice the character Cleo de Nile in the 2022 animated reboot series Monster High.

== Personal life ==
Kausar identifies as queer and has a wife.

== Filmography ==
Film
Year	Title	Role	Notes
2019	Little	Mrs. Parker	Feature film
2019	What Men Want	Jenna Abbiddi	Feature film
2019	I Know Her	Amina	Short film
2020	Got Game?	Kudejha	Short film
2020	Coffee Shop Names	Rakhi	Short film
2020	Lucky	Sarah	Feature film
2020	Dinner Party	Gen	Feature film
2021	The Syed Family Xmas Eve Game Night	Noor	Short film; also writer
2023	Appendage	Esther	Feature film

Television
Year	Title	Role	Notes
2016	Game Shakers	Paulette	1 episode
2017	I Love Dick	Shirin	1 episode
2017	Idiotsitter	Nanoor	1 episode
2018	Speechless	Presenter	1 episode
2018	The Resident	Bridesmaid	1 episode
2018	Silicon Valley	Nadia	2 episodes
2018	Nobodies	Antonia	2 episodes
2019	Black Lightning	Nurse Patel	1 episode
2019	Happy Accident	Navya	TV film
2019	Merry Happy Whatever	Sona	1 episode
2020	Carol's Second Act	Aisha	1 episode
2020	East of La Brea	Farha	Recurring role
2021–2022	4400	Soraya	Recurring role
2022	The Flash	Meena Dhawan / Fast Track	4 episodes

Voiceover
Year	Title	Role	Notes
2019	Rage 2: Rise of the Ghosts	Ghost Zombie / Metro Station Civilian	Video game
2019	Gears 5	Nomad Female / NPCs	Video game
2019	Cannon Busters	Manic	Recurring role English dub
2019-2021	Craig of the Creek	Amina	4 episodes
2019	Crackdown 3	Agent	Video game
2020	Great Pretender	Abigail Jones	Main role English dub
2020–2022	Jurassic World Camp Cretaceous	Yasmina "Yaz" Fadoula	Main role
2021–2022	Mira, Royal Detective	Mrs. Jafri	3 episodes
2022–24	Monster High	Cleo de Nile	Main role
2023	Alice's Wonderland Bakery	Mrs. Parvaneh	
2023	The Loud House	Brooke	Episode; "Pranks Fore Nothing"
2024–2025	Jurassic World: Chaos Theory	Yasmina "Yaz" Fadoula	Main role
2026	Star Wars: Zero Company	The Wildcard	Video game
