= Defund (film) =

2021 Canadian short film

- Directed by: Khadijah Roberts-Abdullah; Araya Mengesha
- Written by: Khadijah Roberts-Abdullah; Araya Mengesha
- Produced by: Khadijah Roberts-Abdullah; Araya Mengesha; J Stevens
- Starring: Khadijah Roberts-Abdullah; Araya Mengesha; Karen Robinson
- Cinematography: J Stevens
- Edited by: J Stevens
- Music by: Denise De'ion
- Release date: September 10, 2021 (TIFF)
- Running time: 14 minutes
- Country: Canada
- Language: English

Defund is a Canadian short drama film, directed by Khadijah Roberts-Abdullah and Araya Mengesha and released in 2021. The film stars Roberts-Abdullah and Mengesha as a sister and brother who have been in isolation in Toronto during the COVID-19 pandemic, and must confront the complexities of political activism when they are motivated to get out into the streets during the Black Lives Matter protests of 2020.

The film's cast also includes Karen Robinson, Vivien Endicott-Douglas, Getenesh Berhe, Nickeshia Garrick, Richard Lam and Anand Rajaram.

The film premiered at the 2021 Toronto International Film Festival, and was subsequently screened at the 2021 Vancouver International Film Festival.

The film was named to TIFF's annual year-end Canada's Top Ten list for 2021.
