= The Syed Family Xmas Eve Game Night =

2021 short comedy

- Directed by: Fawzia Mirza
- Written by: Kausar Mohammed
- Produced by: Amalia Mesa-Gustin; Kausar Mohammed
- Starring: Kausar Mohammed
- Cinematography: Patrick Ouziel
- Edited by: Shelley Therrien
- Production companies: SpeakOut Films; Luchima Productions; Baby Daal Productions
- Release date: September 11, 2021 (TIFF)
- Running time: 11 minutes
- Countries: Canada; United States
- Language: English

The Syed Family Xmas Eve Game Night is a 2021 short comedy film, directed by Fawzia Mirza. The film is written by and stars Kausar Mohammed as Noor, a queer Muslim woman who brings her Puerto Rican partner Luz (Vico Ortiz) home to a family gathering for the first time.

The cast also includes Meera Rohit Kumbhani, Pia Shah and D'Lo.

The film was written by Mohammed, partially based on her own life. It premiered at the 2021 Toronto International Film Festival.

The film was named to TIFF's annual year-end Canada's Top Ten list for 2021.
