= 2021 Toronto International Film Festival =

46th edition of Canadian film festival

- Festival poster
- Opening film: Dear Evan Hansen by Stephen Chbosky
- Closing film: One Second by Zhang Yimou
- Location: Toronto, Ontario, Canada
- Founded: 1976
- Awards: Belfast (People's Choice Award)
- Festival date: September 9–18, 2021
- Website: tiff.net/tiff

Toronto International Film Festival
- 2022 2020

The 2021 Toronto International Film Festival, the 46th event in the Toronto International Film Festival series, was held from September 9 to 18, 2021. Due to the continued COVID-19 pandemic in Toronto, Canada, the festival was staged as a "hybrid" of in-person and digital screenings. Most films were screened both in-person and on the digital platform, although a few titles were withheld by their distributors from the digital platform and instead were screened exclusively in-person.

Artistic director Cameron Bailey indicated that while the 2021 festival would not fully return to the size of program that it offered at the 2019 Toronto International Film Festival, it would be significantly bigger than the reduced lineup that was offered at the 2020 Toronto International Film Festival. Overall, the festival featured over 100 films, including a special retrospective program devoted to the work of Canadian documentary filmmaker Alanis Obomsawin.

== Venues ==
In-person screenings were held at the festival's traditional venues, including the TIFF Bell Lightbox, the Princess of Wales Theatre and Roy Thomson Hall, the latter two of which hosted the world premiere of Stephen Chbosky's film adaptation of Broadway musical Dear Evan Hansen, the festival's opening night gala presentation. Denis Villeneuve's film Dune received an IMAX world premiere screening at the Cinesphere.

As in 2020, digital screenings took place on the Digital TIFF Bell Lightbox platform.

In addition to Toronto, the festival also staged a number of satellite screenings in other Canadian cities for the first time.

== Awards ==
=== TIFF Tribute Awards ===
The festival presented the TIFF Tribute Awards, which were introduced in 2019 to honour actors and filmmakers for distinguished achievements over the course of their careers. The ceremony took place on September 18; as in 2020, it was broadcast by CTV.

The first two honorees announced were Alanis Obomsawin as the recipient of the Jeff Skoll Award in Impact Media and Denis Villeneuve as the winner of the Ebert Director Award. Jessica Chastain and Benedict Cumberbatch were subsequently announced as the recipient of the Actor Awards. Dionne Warwick received the special tribute award, filmmaker Danis Goulet was named the recipient of the Emerging Talent Award, and cinematographer Ari Wegner received the Variety Artisan Award.

=== Regular awards ===
The festival's main awards were announced on September 18, some live during the Tribute Awards broadcast and others on social media following the ceremony's conclusion. A few high-profile titles in the festival program, namely Dune, Last Night in Soho and Spencer, were not eligible for the People's Choice Award, as their distributors had not permitted them to be screened online on the digital platform.

Award	English title	Director(s)	Production country
People's Choice Award	Belfast	Kenneth Branagh	United Kingdom
People's Choice Award, First Runner Up	Scarborough	Shasha Nakhai, Rich Williamson	Canada
People's Choice Award, Second Runner Up	The Power of the Dog	Jane Campion	New Zealand, United Kingdom, Canada, Australia
People's Choice Award: Documentaries	The Rescue	Elizabeth Chai Vasarhelyi, Jimmy Chin	United States, United Kingdom
Documentary, First Runner Up	Dionne Warwick: Don't Make Me Over	Dave Wooley, David Heilbroner	United States
Documentary, Second Runner Up	Flee	Jonas Poher Rasmussen	Denmark, France, Norway, Sweden
People's Choice Award: Midnight Madness	Titane	Julia Ducournau	France, Belgium
Midnight Madness, First Runner Up	You Are Not My Mother	Kate Dolan	Ireland
Midnight Madness, Second Runner Up	Dashcam	Rob Savage	United Kingdom, United States
Platform Prize	Yuni	Kamila Andini	Indonesia, Singapore, France, Australia
Platform Prize, Honorable Mention	Good Madam	Jenna Cato Bass	South Africa
Best Canadian Feature Film	Ste. Anne	Rhayne Vermette	Canada
Best Canadian Feature Film, Honorable Mention	Scarborough	Shasha Nakhai, Rich Williamson	Canada
Best Canadian Short Film	Angakusajaujuq: The Shaman's Apprentice	Zacharias Kunuk	Canada
Best Canadian Short Film, Honorable Mention	Nuisance Bear	Jack Weisman, Gabriela Osio Vanden	Canada
Best International Short Film	Displaced (Pa vend)	Samir Karahoda	Kosovo
Best International Short Film, Honorable Mention	Trumpets in the Sky	Rakan Mayasi	Palestine, Lebanon, France, Belgium
FIPRESCI Award	Anatolian Leopard (Anadolu Leoparı)	Emre Kayiş	Turkey, Poland, Germany, Denmark
NETPAC Award	Costa Brava, Lebanon	Mounia Aki	Lebanon, France, Qatar, Spain, Sweden, Denmark, Norway, United States
Amplify Voices	The Gravedigger's Wife	Khadar Ayderus Ahmed	Somalia, France, Germany, Finland
Amplify Voices	A Night of Knowing Nothing	Payal Kapadia	India, France
Changemaker Award	Scarborough	Shasha Nakhai, Rich Williamson	Canada
Share Her Journey	Astel	Ramata-Toulaye Sy	Senegal, France
Share Her Journey, Honorable Mention	Love, Dad (Milý tati)	Diana Cam Van Nguyen	Czech Republic, Slovakia

== Programme ==
The first 13 films selected for the festival were announced in June 2021. The gala and special presentation programs were announced on July 20, while Contemporary World Cinema and Discovery titles were announced on July 28, TIFF Docs, Midnight Madness and Wavelengths were announced on August 4, Shortcuts and Platform were announced on August 11, and Primetime was announced on August 13.

Walt Becker's Clifford the Big Red Dog was initially selected to be one of the Gala Presentations, but was withdrawn from the festival, after US distributor Paramount Pictures pulled it from its release schedule due to the rise of the Delta variant of COVID-19.

The festival also announced a special event screening of an unspecified new film by Steven Soderbergh. Details of the film were not announced in advance, except that it was not expected to be his known upcoming film KIMI. Soderbergh ultimately premiered a reedited version of his 1991 film Kafka titled Mr. Kneff.

=== Gala presentations ===
English Title	Original Title	Director(s)	Production Country
Belfast		Kenneth Branagh	United Kingdom, Ireland
Bergman Island		Mia Hansen-Løve	France, Mexico, Brazil, Germany
Dear Evan Hansen		Stephen Chbosky	United States
The Electrical Life of Louis Wain		Will Sharpe	United Kingdom, United States
The Forgiven		John Michael McDonagh	United Kingdom, United States
The Good House		Maya Forbes, Wally Wolodarsky	United States
Jagged		Alison Klayman	United States
Lakewood		Phillip Noyce	United States, Canada
Last Night in Soho		Edgar Wright	United Kingdom
The Mad Women's Ball	Le Bal des folles	Mélanie Laurent	France
Night Raiders		Danis Goulet	Canada, New Zealand
One Second	一秒钟	Zhang Yimou	China
Silent Night		Camille Griffin	United Kingdom
The Survivor		Barry Levinson	United States
The Worst Person in the World	Verdens verste menneske	Joachim Trier	Norway

=== Special Presentations ===
English Title	Original Title	Director(s)	Production Country
Ahed's Knee	הַבֶּרֶךְ	Nadav Lapid	Israel, France, Germany
Ali & Ava		Clio Barnard	United Kingdom
All My Puny Sorrows		Michael McGowan	Canada
The Box	La Caja	Lorenzo Vigas	Mexico
Benediction		Terence Davies	United Kingdom, United States
Charlotte		Eric Warin, Tahir Rana	Canada, France, Belgium
Dionne Warwick: Don't Make Me Over		Dave Wooley, David Heilbroner	United States
Drive My Car	ドライブ・マイ・カー	Ryusuke Hamaguchi	Japan
Encounter		Michael Pearce	United Kingdom, United States
The Eyes of Tammy Faye		Michael Showalter	United States
The Falls	瀑布	Chung Mong-hong	Taiwan
France		Bruno Dumont	France, Italy, Germany, Belgium
The Guilty		Antoine Fuqua	United States
The Humans		Stephen Karam	United States
I'm Your Man	Ich bin dein Mensch	Maria Schrader	Germany
Inexorable		Fabrice Du Welz	Belgium, France
Inu-Oh		Masaaki Yuasa	Japan, China
Lingui, The Sacred Bonds	Lingui, les liens sacrés	Mahamat-Saleh Haroun	France, Chad, Germany, Belgium
The Middle Man		Bent Hamer	Canada, Denmark, Germany, Norway
Mothering Sunday		Eva Husson	United Kingdom
Official Competition	Competencia oficial	Gastón Duprat & Mariano Cohn	Spain
Petite Maman		Céline Sciamma	France
The Power of the Dog		Jane Campion	United Kingdom, Australia, United States, Canada, New Zealand
The Starling		Theodore Melfi	United States
The Story of My Wife	A feleségem története	Ildikó Enyedi	Hungary, Germany, France, Italy
Sundown		Michel Franco	Mexico, France, Sweden
Three Floors	Tre piani	Nanni Moretti	Italy, France
Violet		Justine Bateman	United States
Where Is Anne Frank		Ari Folman	Belgium, Luxembourg, Israel, Netherlands, France
Wolf		Nathalie Biancheri	Ireland, Poland

=== Special Events ===
English Title	Original Title	Director(s)	Production Country
Dune		Denis Villeneuve	United States
A Hero	قهرمان	Asghar Farhadi	Iran
Memoria		Apichatpong Weerasethakul	Thailand, Colombia, France, Germany, Mexico, China
Memory Box: Echoes of 9/11		Bjørn Johnson, David Belton	United Kingdom, United States
Mr. Kneff		Steven Soderbergh	United States
NBA Films for Fans ("Shorty", "Inheritance", "Born Identities", "Draft Day", "The Shot")		Romeo Candido, Shawn Gerrard, Kathleen Jayme, Thyrone Tommy, S.M. Turrell	Canada
Spencer		Pablo Larraín	United Kingdom, United States, Germany, Chile
Triumph: Rock & Roll Machine		Sam Dunn, Marc Ricciardelli	Canada

=== Contemporary World Cinema ===
English Title	Original Title	Director(s)	Production Country
7 Prisoners	7 Prisioneiros	Alexandre Moratto	Brazil
Are You Lonesome Tonight?	熱帶往事	Wen Shipei	China
Compartment No. 6	Hytti nro 6	Juho Kuosmanen	Finland, Estonia, Germany, Russia
Costa Brava, Lebanon		Mounia Aki	Lebanon, France, Qatar, Spain, Sweden, Denmark, Norway, United States
The Daughter	La hija	Manuel Martín Cuenca	Spain
The Gravedigger's Wife		Khadar Ayderus Ahmed	France, Somalia, Germany
The Hill Where Lionesses Roar	La colline où rugissent les lionnes	Luàna Bajrami	France, Kosovo
Întregalde		Radu Muntean	Romania
Jockey		Clint Bentley	United States
Kicking Blood		Blaine Thurier	Canada
La Soga 2		Manny Pérez	United States
Maria Chapdelaine		Sébastien Pilote	Canada
Medusa		Anita Rocha da Silveira	Brazil
Murina		Antoneta Alamat Kusijanović	United States, Brazil, Croatia, Slovenia
Nobody Has to Know		Bouli Lanners	France, Belgium, United Kingdom
The Odd-Job Men	Sis dies corrents	Neus Ballús	Spain
The Other Tom	El otro Tom	Rodrigo Plá, Laura Santullo	Mexico, United States
Out of Sync	Tres	Juanjo Giménez	Spain, Lithuania, France
Small Body	Piccolo Corpo	Laura Samani	Italy, France, Slovenia
Terrorizers	青春弒戀	Ho Wi Ding	Taiwan
True Things		Harry Wootliff	United Kingdom
Unclenching the Fists	Разжимая кулаки	Kira Kovalenko	Russia
Vengeance Is Mine, All Others Pay Cash	Seperti Dendam, Rindu Harus Dibayar Tuntas	Edwin	Indonesia
The Wheel		Steve Pink	United States
Whether the Weather Is Fine	Kun Maupay Man it Panahon	Carlo Francisco Manatad	Philippines

=== Celebrating Alanis ===
Program	Title	Year	Director(s)	Production Country
Lighting the Fire 1	The Canoe	1972	Alanis Obomsawin	Canada
Lighting the Fire 1	Kanehsatake: 270 Years of Resistance	1993	Alanis Obomsawin	Canada
Lighting the Fire 2	Amisk	1977	Alanis Obomsawin	Canada
Lighting the Fire 2	Incident at Restigouche	1984	Alanis Obomsawin	Canada
Lighting the Fire 2	Moose Call	1972	Alanis Obomsawin	Canada
Portraits 1	Mother of Many Children	1977	Alanis Obomsawin	Canada
Portraits 1	Puberty, Part 1	1975	Alanis Obomsawin	Canada
Portraits 1	Puberty, Part 2	1975	Alanis Obomsawin	Canada
Portraits 2	No Address	1988	Alanis Obomsawin	Canada
Portraits 2	Richard Cardinal: Cry from a Diary of a Métis Child	1986	Alanis Obomsawin	Canada
The Dignity of Children 1	Our People Will Be Healed	2017	Alanis Obomsawin	Canada
The Dignity of Children 1	Snowshoes	1972	Alanis Obomsawin	Canada
The Dignity of Children 1	Walking Is Medicine	2017	Alanis Obomsawin	Canada
The Dignity of Children 2	Children	1972	Alanis Obomsawin	Canada
The Dignity of Children 2	Christmas at Moose Factory	1971	Alanis Obomsawin	Canada
The Dignity of Children 2	Honour to Senator Murray Sinclair	2021	Alanis Obomsawin	Canada
The Dignity of Children 2	Mount Currie Summer Camp	1975	Alanis Obomsawin	Canada
The Dignity of Children 2	Sigwan	2005	Alanis Obomsawin	Canada
The Dignity of Children 2	When All the Leaves Are Gone	2010	Alanis Obomsawin	Canada

=== TIFF Docs ===
English title	Original title	Director(s)	Production country
Attica		Stanley Nelson Jr.	United States
Burning		Eva Orner	Australia
Beba		Rebecca Huntt	United States, Mexico
Becoming Cousteau		Liz Garbus	United States
Comala		Gian Cassini	Mexico
The Devil's Drivers		Mohammed Abugeth, Daniel Carsenty	Qatar, France, Lebanon, Germany
Flee		Jonas Poher Rasmussen	United States, United Kingdom, France, Sweden, Norway, Denmark
Hold Your Fire		Stefan Forbes	United States
Julia		Julie Cohen and Betsy West	United States
Listening to Kenny G		Penny Lane	United States
Oscar Peterson: Black and White		Barry Avrich	Canada
The Rescue		Elizabeth Chai Vasarhelyi, Jimmy Chin	United States, United Kingdom
Three Minutes: A Lengthening		Bianca Stigter	Netherlands, United Kingdom
Wochiigii lo: End of the Peace		Heather Hatch	Canada

=== Discovery ===
English title	Original title	Director(s)	Production country
Aloners	Hon-ja-sa-neun Sa-ram-deul	Hong Sung-eun	South Korea
Anatolian Leopard	Anadolu Leoparı	Emre Kayiş	Turkey, Germany, Poland, Denmark
As in Heaven	Du som er i himlen	Tea Lindeburg	Denmark
A Banquet		Ruth Paxton	United Kingdom
Dug Dug		Ritwik Pareek	India
Farha		Darin J. Sallam	Jordan, Sweden, Saudi Arabia
The Game		Ana Lazarevic	Serbia, United States
Learn to Swim		Thyrone Tommy	Canada
Lo Invisible		Javier Andrade	Ecuador, France
Quickening		Haya Waseem	Canada
PAKA (River of Blood)	Paka	Nithin Lukose	India
Scarborough		Shasha Nakhai, Rich Williamson	Canada
Snakehead		Evan Jackson Leong	United States
To Kill the Beast	Matar a la Bestia	Agustina San Martín	Argentina, Brazil, Chile
Tug of War	Vuta N'Kuvute	Amil Shivji	Tanzania, South Africa, Germany, Qatar
Wildhood		Bretten Hannam	Canada

=== Midnight Madness ===
English title	Original title	Director(s)	Production country
After Blue (Dirty Paradise)	After Blue (Paradis Sale)	Bertrand Mandico	France
Dashcam		Rob Savage	United Kingdom, United States
Saloum		Jean Luc Herbulot	Senegal
Titane		Julia Ducournau	France
You Are Not My Mother		Kate Dolan	Ireland
Zalava		Arsalan Amiri	Iran

=== Wavelengths ===
English title	Original title	Director(s)	Production country
The Capacity for Adequate Anger		Vika Kirchenbauer	Germany
Dear Chantal	Querida Chantal	Nicolás Pereda	Mexico, Spain
earthearthearth		Daïchi Saïto	Canada
Futura		Pietro Marcello, Francesco Munzi, Alice Rohrwacher	Italy
The Girl and the Spider	Das Mädchen und die Spinne	Ramon Zürcher, Silvan Zürcher	Switzerland
Inner Outer Space		Laida Lertxundi	Spain
Neptune Frost		Saul Williams, Anisia Uzeyman	United States, Rwanda
A Night of Knowing Nothing		Payal Kapadia	India, France
Polycephaly in D		Michael Robinson	United States
the red filter is withdrawn	Le-deu-pil-teo-ga Cheol-hoe-doeb-ni-da	Minjung Kim	South Korea
Ste. Anne		Rhayne Vermette	Canada
Train Again		Peter Tscherkassky	Austria
The Tsugua Diaries	Diários de Otsoga	Maureen Fazendeiro, Miguel Gomes	Portugal

=== Platform ===
English title	Original title	Director(s)	Production country
Arthur Rambo		Laurent Cantet	France
Drunken Birds	Les oiseaux ivres	Ivan Grbovic	Canada
Earwig		Lucile Hadžihalilović	United Kingdom, France, Belgium
Good Madam	Mlungu Wam	Jenna Cato Bass	South Africa
Huda's Salon		Hany Abu-Assad	Palestine, Egypt, Netherlands, Qatar
Montana Story		Scott McGehee, David Siegel	United States
Silent Land	Cicha Ziemia	Aga Woszczyńska	Poland, Italy, Czech Republic
Yuni		Kamila Andini	Indonesia, Singapore, France, Australia

=== Primetime ===
English title	Original title	Director(s)	Production country
Colin in Black & White		Ava DuVernay, Colin Kaepernick	United States
Hellbound		Yeon Sang-ho	South Korea
The Panthers		Tom Hern, Halaifonua Finau	New Zealand
Sort Of		Bilal Baig, Fab Filippo	Canada

=== Short Cuts ===
English title	Original title	Director(s)	Production country
Angakusajaujuq: The Shaman's Apprentice		Zacharias Kunuk	Canada
Anxious Body		Yoriko Mizushiri	France, Japan
Astel		Ramata-Toulaye Sy	France, Senegal
Beity		Isabelle Mecattaf	Lebanon, United States
Boobs	Lolos	Marie Valade	Canada
Brothers	Bhai	Hamza Bangash	Canada, Pakistan
Charlotte		Zach Dorn	United States
Defund		Khadijah Roberts-Abdullah, Araya Mengesha	Canada
Displaced	Pa Vend	Samir Karahoda	Kosovo
Dust Bath		Seth A. Smith	Canada
Fanmi		Sandrine Brodeur-Desrosiers, Carmine Pierre-Dufour	Canada
A Few Miles South		Ben Pearce	United Kingdom
The Future Isn't What It Used to Be		Adeyemi Michael	United Kingdom
Hanging On		Alfie Barker	United Kingdom
I Gotta Look Good for the Apocalypse		Ayçe Kartal	France
I Would Never		Kiran Deol	United States
The Infantas	Las Infantas	Andrea Herrera Catalá	Spain
Little Bird		Tim Myles	Canada
Love, Dad	Milý tati	Diana Cam Van Nguyen	Czech Republic, Slovakia
Masquerade	Egúngún	Olive Nwosu	United Kingdom, Nigeria
Meneath: The Hidden Island of Ethics		Terril Calder	Canada
Motorcyclist’s Happiness Won’t Fit Into His Suit	Al motociclista no le cabe la felicidad en el traje	Gabriel Herrera	Mexico
Nuisance Bear		Jack Weisman, Gabriela Osio Vanden	Canada
Ousmane		Jorge Camarotti	Canada
Saturday Night		Rosana Matecki	Canada
Shark		Nash Edgerton	Australia
Soft Animals		Renee Zhan	United Kingdom
Some Still Search	Algunos Siguen Buscando	Nesaru Tchaas	United States
Srikandi		Andrea Nirmala Widjajanto	Canada, Indonesia
Successful Thawing of Mr. Moro	Lyckad upptining av herr Moro	Jerry Carlsson	Sweden
Sycorax		Lois Patiño, Matías Piñeiro	Portugal, Spain
The Syed Family Xmas Eve Game Night		Fawzia Mirza	Canada
Together		Albert Shin	Canada, South Korea
Trumpets in the Sky		Rakan Mayasi	Palestine, Lebanon, France, Belgium
Twelve Hours		Paul Shkordoff	Canada
White Devil		Benjamin Dickinson, Mariama Diallo	United States
You and Me, Before and After		Madeleine Gottlieb	Australia
Zero	Nula	Lee Filipovski	Canada, Serbia

=== TIFF Rewind ===
A new program which saw classic films that screened at TIFF in past years made available for streaming on Crave, paired with talks by actors or filmmakers involved in the production.

Film	Speaker(s)
Best in Show	Christopher Guest, Eugene Levy, Catherine O'Hara
Eastern Promises	Viggo Mortensen
Precious	Lee Daniels, Gabourey Sidibe
Real Women Have Curves	Patricia Cardoso, America Ferrera
Training Day	Antoine Fuqua

=== TIFF Cinemathèque ===
English title	Original title	Director(s)	Production country
Atanarjuat: The Fast Runner	ᐊᑕᓈᕐᔪᐊᑦ	Zacharias Kunuk	Canada

=== Coast-to-Coast Screenings ===
Special screenings of selected Gala or Special Presentations films in other communities across Canada.

Film	Location	Date
Charlotte	Moose Jaw, Saskatchewan	September 13
Dune	Montreal, Quebec	September 12
The Electrical Life of Louis Wain	Summerside, Prince Edward Island	September 13
I'm Your Man	Markham, Ontario	September 13
Night Raiders	Collingwood, Ontario	September 13
Night Raiders	Saint John, New Brunswick	September 13
Official Competition	Prince Rupert, British Columbia	September 13

=== Industry Selects ===
As in 2020 the Industry Selects program screened films for industry professionals, acting as a film market due to the continued COVID-19 pandemic having impacted the ability of filmmakers and critics to travel to international film festivals, but was not made available for the general public.

English title	Original title	Director(s)	Production country
107 Mothers	Cenzorka	Peter Kerekes	Slovakia
America Latina		Damiano and Fabio D'Innocenzo	Italy, France
Cadejo Blanco		Justin Lerner	Guatemala, United States, Mexico
Carmen		Valerie Buhagiar	Malta, Canada
La Civil		Teodora Ana Mihai	Belgium, Romania, Mexico
Cool Abdoul		Jonas Backeland	Belgium
Domingo		Raúl López Echeverría	Mexico, Austria, France
The Hole in the Fence	El hoyo en la cerca	Joaquín del Paso	Mexico, Poland
The King of All the World	El Rey de Todo el Mundo	Carlos Saura	Mexico, Spain
The Last Mark		Reem Morsi	Canada
My Night	Ma nuit	Antoinette Boulat	France
Night Blooms		Stephanie Joline	Canada
Nightride		Stephen Fingleton	United Kingdom
Nr. 10		Alex van Warmerdam	Netherlands, Belgium
Old Henry		Potsy Ponciroli	United States
Onoda: 10,000 Nights in the Jungle	Onoda, 10 000 nuits dans la jungle	Arthur Harari	France, Japan, Germany, Belgium, Italy
The Pink Cloud	A Nuvem Rosa	Iuli Gerbase	Brazil
Quake		Tinna Hrafnsdóttir	Iceland
Reflection	Відблиск	Valentyn Vasyanovych	Ukraine
The Score		Malachi Smyth	United Kingdom
Shankar's Fairies		Irfana Majumdar	India
A Tale of Love and Desire	Une histoire d'amour et de désir	Leyla Bouzid	France

== Canada's Top Ten ==
The festival's annual year-end Canada's Top Ten list, collecting the films named as the top Canadian films of the year by critics and film festival programmers from across Canada, was released on December 6, 2021.

=== Feature films ===
- All My Puny Sorrows — Michael McGowan
- Charlotte — Eric Warin, Tahir Rana
- Drunken Birds (Les oiseaux ivres) — Ivan Grbovic
- Learn to Swim — Thyrone Tommy
- Night Raiders — Danis Goulet
- Maria Chapdelaine — Sébastien Pilote
- Scarborough — Shasha Nakhai, Rich Williamson
- Ste. Anne — Rhayne Vermette
- Subjects of Desire — Jennifer Holness
- The White Fortress — Igor Drljača

=== Short films ===
- Ain't No Time for Women — Sarra El Abed
- Angakusajaujuq: The Shaman's Apprentice — Zacharias Kunuk
- Boobs (Lolos) — Marie Valade
- Defund — Khadijah Roberts-Abdullah, Araya Mengesha
- Fanmi — Sandrine Brodeur-Desrosiers, Carmine Pierre-Dufour
- Honour to Senator Murray Sinclair — Alanis Obomsawin
- Like the Ones I Used to Know (Les grandes claques) — Annie St-Pierre
- Meneath: The Hidden Island of Ethics — Terril Calder
- The Syed Family Xmas Eve Game Night — Fawzia Mirza
- Together — Albert Shin
