= Ramata-Toulaye Sy =

Senegalese-French film director and screenwriter

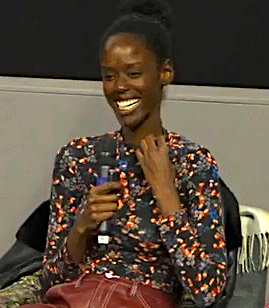
- Sy in 2024
- Born: 1986/1987 (age 39–40); Senegal
- Occupations: Film director Screenwriter

Ramata-Toulaye Sy (French: [ʁamata tulɛi si]; born 1986/1987) is a French-Senegalese film director and screenwriter.

== Early life and education ==
Ramata-Toulaye Sy was born in Bezons, Paris to Senegalese parents. She studied at La Fémis in Paris, graduating in 2015. She lived in Dakar, Senegal for several years after graduation.

== Career ==
Sy's 2021 short film Astel was the winner of the Share Her Journey award at the 2021 Toronto International Film Festival, and the SACD Award and a Special Jury Prize at the 2022 Clermont-Ferrand International Short Film Festival.

Sy was a cowriter of the feature films Sibel and Our Lady of the Nile (Notre-Dame-du-Nil), before making Astel as her first directorial project.

Her feature debut, Banel & Adama, entered production in 2022, premiered at the 2023 Cannes Film Festival and was also screened at the 2023 Toronto International Film Festival. The film received praise from critics who described it as an expressive debut from a promising director.

In 2026, Sy served on the jury of the Marrakech International Film Festival, chaired by Marion Cotillard.
