= Ste. Anne (film) =

2021 Canadian film

- Directed by: Rhayne Vermette
- Written by: Rhayne Vermette
- Produced by: Rhayne Vermette
- Starring: Rhéanne Vermette; Jack Theis; Valerie Marion; Isabelle d’Eschambault
- Cinematography: Kristiane Church; Amanda Kindzierski; Lindsay McIntyre; Erin Weisgerber; Rhayne Vermette
- Edited by: Rhayne Vermette
- Music by: Bret Parenteau
- Production company: Exovedate Productions
- Release date: May 3, 2021 (JIFF)
- Running time: 80 minutes
- Country: Canada
- Language: French

Ste. Anne is a Canadian experimental drama film, directed by Rhayne Vermette and released in 2021. The film stars Vermette as Renée, a Métis woman returning to her hometown in Manitoba for the first time in four years to reconnect with her family.

The film's cast also includes Jack Theis, Valerie Marion, Andrina Turenne and Isabelle d’Eschambault.

The film premiered in May 2021 at the Jeonju International Film Festival, It was subsequently screened at the 71st Berlin International Film Festival, and had its Canadian premiere at the 2021 Toronto International Film Festival.

The film won the Amplify Voices award for Best Canadian Film at TIFF, and was a nominee for the DGC Discovery Award at the 2021 Directors Guild of Canada awards. It was subsequently named to TIFF's annual year-end Canada's Top Ten list for 2021.
