= Levers (film) =

2025 Canadian film

- Directed by: Rhayne Vermette
- Written by: Rhayne Vermette
- Produced by: Rhayne Vermette; Oliver King; Charlene Moore
- Starring: Val Vint; Andrina Turenne; Will George
- Cinematography: Rhayne Vermette; Ryan Steel; Heidi Phillips; Kristiane Church
- Edited by: Rhayne Vermette
- Music by: Bret Parenteau
- Production company: Exovedate Productions
- Release date: September 5, 2025 (TIFF)
- Running time: 80 minutes
- Country: Canada
- Language: French

Levers is a Canadian experimental drama film, directed by Rhayne Vermette and released in 2025. The film centres on a small town in Manitoba whose residents are tested when the town is plunged into darkness by an unexpected solar eclipse just as a community sculpture is about to be unveiled in the town centre, with the story told episodically in 22 chapters inspired by the Major Arcana in a deck of tarot cards.

The cast includes Val Vint, Andrina Turenne and Will George.

The film premiered in the Wavelengths program at the 2025 Toronto International Film Festival.

== Critical response ==
Shelagh Rowan-Legg of Screen Anarchy wrote that "Levers is something of an enigma, but that is what suits its slippery, hazy narrative that asks us to question how to look and move through the world when we must rethink how we encounter it. Mostly, it looks to a community to understand how that realignment must take place, with the knowledge that the unknown is upon us, and a different (or perhaps renewed) kind of labour is necessary to carry through it."
