= Rhayne Vermette =

Canadian filmmaker

Rhéanne Vermette (born 1982), known professionally as Rhayne Vermette, is a Métis filmmaker from Canada. She is most noted for her 2021 film Ste. Anne, which won the Amplify Voices award for Best Canadian Film at the 2021 Toronto International Film Festival.

Originally from Notre-Dame-de-Lourdes, Manitoba, Vermette studied architecture at the University of Manitoba. Her filmmaking style is experimental, typically blending aspects of narrative fiction, animation and documentary into collage films.

She previously wrote and directed the short films R Seymore Goes North (2011), Tudor Village: A One Shot Deal (2012), Rob What (2014) and U.F.O. (2016), and had acting roles in the short film Accidence and the television series Edgar.

Her second feature film, Levers, is slated to premiere in the Wavelengths program at the 2025 Toronto International Film Festival.

== Collections ==
Walker Art Center, Minneapolis
