= List of Canadian films of 2022 =

This is a list of Canadian films released in 2022.

Title	Director	Cast	Notes	Ref
III	Salomé Villeneuve	Eliott Desjardins Gauthier, Alex Dupras, Anne Florence Lavigne-Desjardins		
The 12 Tasks of Imelda (Les 12 travails d'Imelda)	Martin Villeneuve	Martin Villeneuve, Robert Lepage, Ginette Reno		
305 Bellechasse	Maxime-Claude L'Écuyer			
752 Is Not a Number	Babak Payami			
2012/Through the Heart (2012/Dans le cœur)	Rodrigue Jean, Arnaud Valade			
À la vie à l'amor	Émilie Mannering	Lex Garcia		
About Memory and Loss (Notes sur la mémoire et l'oubli)	Amélie Hardy			
Adore	Beth Warrian			
Adult Adoption	Karen Knox	Ellie Moon, Rebecca Northan		
Agony (Agonie)	Arnaud Beaudoux			
And Still I Sing	Fazila Amiri	Aryana Sayeed		
Anyox	Jessica Johnson, Ryan Ermacora			
Arctic Song	Germaine Arnattaujuq, Neil Christopher, Louise Flaherty			
Arlette	Mariloup Wolfe	Maripier Morin, Gilbert Sicotte, David La Haye, Paul Ahmarani, Benoît Brière		
Ashgrove	Jeremy Lalonde	Amanda Brugel, Jonas Chernick, Shawn Doyle, Natalie Brown, Christine Horne, Sugith Varughese		
Ayoungman	Holly Fortier, Larry Day			
Babysitter	Monia Chokri	Patrick Hivon, Monia Chokri, Nadia Tereszkiewicz		
Baba	Anya Chirkova, Meran Ismailsoy			
Back Home	Nisha Platzer			
Backlash: Misogyny in the Digital Age	Léa Clermont-Dion, Guylaine Maroist			
The Ballad of Gus	Brian Barnhart			
Balestra	Nicole Dorsey	Tessa Thompson, Marwan Kenzari, Manny Jacinto		
Batata	Noura Kevorkian			
Beautiful Scars	Shane Belcourt	Tom Wilson		
Before I Change My Mind	Trevor Anderson			
Belle River	Guillaume Fournier, Samuel Matteau, Yannick Nolin			
Bernie Langille Wants to Know What Happened to Bernie Langille	Jackie Torrens			
Bill Reid Remembers	Alanis Obomsawin	Bill Reid		
Bite of a Mango	Ron Dias	Ryan Rosery, Jayne Kamara, Orville Cummings, Nathan Taylor		
Black Cyclone	Clement Virgo			
Black Ice	Hubert Davis			
Blackbear	Bryce Hodgson	Mio Adilman, Toshiko Adilman, Sachi Adilman		
Blind Willow, Sleeping Woman (Saules aveugles, femme endormie)	Pierre Földes			
Blond Night (Nuit blonde)	Gabrielle Demers			
Bloom (Jouvencelles)	Fanie Pelletier			
Bones of Crows	Marie Clements	Grace Dove		
Boy City	Sean Cisterna			
Brasier	Émilie Mannering			
The Breach	Rodrigo Gudiño	Allan Hawco, Wesley French, Emily Alatalo		
Breathe (Respire)	Onur Karaman	Amedamine Ouerghi, Frédéric Lemay, Mohammed Marouazi		
Brightstar	Raphaël Hébert			
Broken Angel (MaaShwaKan MaNiTo)	Jules Arita Koostachin	Sera-Lys McArthur, Brooklyn Letexier-Hart, Asivak Koostachin		
Broken Courage	David Peck, Nathanael Draper			
Brother	Clement Virgo	Lamar Johnson, Aaron Pierre, Kiana Madeira, Marsha Stephanie Blake		
Buffy Sainte-Marie: Carry It On	Madison Thomas	Buffy Sainte-Marie		
Bungalow	Lawrence Côté-Collins	Sonia Cordeau, Guillaume Cyr, Geneviève Schmidt		
Bystanders	Koumbie	Taylor Olson, Deborah Castrilli		
Canary	Pierre-Hugues Dallaire, Benoit Therriault			
Category: Woman	Phyllis Ellis	Caster Semenya, Dutee Chand, Annet Negesa		
The Chase	Gurjeet Kaur Bassi			
Chasing Birds	Una Lorenzen			
The Cheaters (Les Tricheurs)	Louis Godbout	Christine Beaulieu, Benoît Gouin, Alexandre Goyette, Steve Laplante		
Coin Slot	Scott Jones			
Cold Tea	Asim Overstands, Alim Sabir			
Colorblind	Mostafa Keshvari			
The Colour of Ink	Brian D. Johnson			
Come Clean	Neil Graham, Derreck Roemer			
Compulsus	Tara Thorne			
Concrete Valley	Antoine Bourges			
Coyote (Le Coyote)	Katherine Jerkovic	Jorge Martinez Colorado, Eva Avila		
Crimes of the Future	David Cronenberg	Viggo Mortensen, Léa Seydoux, Kristen Stewart, Scott Speedman		
Crystal Pite: Angels' Atlas	Chelsea McMullan	Crystal Pite		
Cult Hero	Jesse Thomas Cook	Liv Collins, Ry Barrett, Tony Burgess, Justin Bott		
Daniel's Gotta Die	Jeremy Lalonde	Joel David Moore, Jason Jones, Mary Lynn Rajskub, Bob Saget		
Dark Nature	Berkley Brady	Hannah Emily Anderson, Madison Walsh, Roseanne Supernault, Helen Belay, Kyra Harper		
Delia's Gone	Robert Budreau	Stephan James, Marisa Tomei		
Dhulpa	Kunsang Kyirong			
The Diabetic	Mitchell Stafiej	James Watts, Travis Cannon, Maica Armata	Comedy	
Diaspora	Deco Dawson	Mateo Gubec, Eva Sarte, Yuliia Guhzva	Drama	
Diaspora	Tyler Mckenzie Evans		Short	
Don't Come Searching	Andrew Moir			
Doug and the Slugs and Me	Teresa Alfeld			
Dounia and the Princess of Aleppo (Dounia et la princesse d'Alep)	André Kadi, Marya Zarif			
The Dream and the Radio (Le Rêve et la radio)	Renaud Després-Larose, Ana Tapia Rousiouk			
The Empress of Vancouver	Dave Rodden Shortt			
The End of Sex	Sean Garrity	Jonas Chernick, Emily Hampshire		
Eternal Spring	Jason Loftus	Daxiong		
Ever Deadly	Chelsea McMullan, Tanya Tagaq			
Exile	Jason James	Adam Beach, Camille Sullivan		
Falcon Lake	Charlotte Le Bon	Joseph Engel, Sara Montpetit, Karine Gonthier-Hyndman, Monia Chokri		
Family Game (Arsenault et fils)	Rafaël Ouellet	Guillaume Cyr, Luc Picard, Micheline Lanctôt, Karine Vanasse		
The Family of the Forest (La famille de la forêt)	Laura Rietveld	Gérard Mathar, Catherine Jacob		
The Faraway Place	Kenny Welsh			
Father of Nations	Aleisha Anderson	Nathan Horch, Ed Ogum, Lindsay Christopher, Kyra MacPherson, Griffin Cork, Cerise Pepper, Jeffrey Sawalha, Jennifer Poppe		
The Fight Machine	Andrew Thomas Hunt			
First Months of Freedom	Kriss Li			
First to Stand: The Cases and Causes of Irwin Cotler	Irene Angelico, Abbey Jack Neidik	Irwin Cotler		
The Flying Sailor (Le Matelot volant)	Wendy Tilby and Amanda Forbis			
Foul	Ted Stenson			
Framing Agnes	Chase Joynt	Angelica Ross, Zackary Drucker, Jen Richards, Max Wolf Valerio, Silas Howard, Stephen Ira		
Framing the Self	Andrea Cristini			
Francheska: Prairie Queen	Laura O'Grady	Francis Yutrago		
From Chile to Canada: Media Herstories	Sarah Shamash, Sonia Medel			
Gathering Storm	Jeff Khounthavong			
Geographies of Solitude	Jacquelyn Mills	Zoe Lucas		
The Goats of Monesiglio	Emily Graves			
Golden Delicious	Jason Karman	Cardi Wong, Chris Carson		
Greyland	Alexandra Sicotte-Lévesque			
The Grizzlie Truth	Kathleen Jayme	Kathleen Jayme, Shareef Abdur Rahim, Stu Jackson, Mike Bibby		
Grown in Darkness	Devin Shears			
La Guêpe	Marc Beaupré			
Heartbeat of a Nation	Eric Janvier			
Hearth of the Lion	Vicki Van Chau			
Hills and Mountains	Salar Pashtoonyar			
Honeycomb	Avalon Fast			
Horse Brothers	Milos Mitrovic, Fabian Velasco			
How to Get Your Parents to Divorce (Pas d'chicane dans ma cabane!)	Sandrine Brodeur-Desrosiers	Charlotte St-Martin, Pierre-Luc Brillant, Isabelle Blais		
Humus	Carole Poliquin	Mélina Plante, François D'Aoust		
Hunting in Packs	Chloe Sosa-Sims	Michelle Rempel Garner, Pramila Jayapal, Jess Phillips		
I Empower as a Mother	Dani Barker, Inder Nirwan			
I Like Movies	Chandler Levack	Isaiah Lehtinen, Romina D'Ugo, Percy Hynes White		
I Lost My Mom (J'ai placé ma mère)	Denys Desjardins			
I See Me Watching	Sidney Gordon			
I, Sun (Moi soleil)	Julien Falardeau			
I Thought the World of You	Kurt Walker			
I Will Not Starve (Non morirò di fame)	Umberto Spinazzola	Michele Di Mauro, Jerzy Stuhr, Chiara Merulla, Claudia Ferri	Canadian-Italian coproduction	
The Ice Walk	Eliza Knockwood			
Icebreaker: The 1972 Summit Series	Robbie Hart	Gary Smith, Harnarayan Singh, Ron Maclean, Margaret Trudeau, Wayne Gretzky		
In Broad Daylight (Au grand jour)	Emmanuel Tardif	Amaryllis Tremblay, Karine Gonthier-Hyndman, David Savard, Elijah Patrice, Jean-Simon Leduc, Marianne Fortier		
Insanity	Wendy Hill-Tout	Brandon DeWyn		
Into the Weeds	Jennifer Baichwal			
Invincible	Vincent René-Lortie	Léokim Beaumier-Lépine, Isabelle Blais, Pierre-Luc Brillant		
It's What Each Person Needs	Sophy Romvari			
Junior's Giant	Paula Brancati	Eric Peterson, Kinley Mochrie, Debra McGrath		
The Kids in the Hall: Comedy Punks	Reginald Harkema	The Kids in the Hall		
Kikino Kids	Barry Bilinsky			
Kite Zo A: Leave the Bones	Kaveh Nabatian			
Kings of Coke	Julian Sher			
The Klabona Keepers	Tamo Campos, Jasper Snow-Rosen			
The Last Mark	Reem Morsi	Shawn Doyle, Alexia Fast, Jonas Chernick		
Late Night Walks (Promenades nocturnes)	Ryan McKenna	Marie Brassard, Sarianne Cormier, Martin Dubreuil		
Late Summer	Ryan Steel			
Lay Down Your Heart	Marie Clements			
Lay Me by the Shore	David Findlay			
Lemon Squeezy	Kevin Hartford			
Lines of Escape (Lignes de fuite)	Catherine Chabot, Miryam Bouchard	Catherine Chabot, Mariana Mazza, Léane Labrèche-Dor, Victoria Diamond, Maxime de Cotret, Mickaël Gouin		
Lissa's Trip	Jeffrey Scott Lando			
Love, Amma	Prajwala Dixit			
Love in the Time of Fentanyl	Colin Askey			
The Maiden	Graham Foy	Jackson Sluiter, Marcel T Jiménez, Hayley Ness		
Mariposa	John Greyson, Bongani Ndodana-Breen			
Meeting with Robert Dole (Rencontre avec Robert Dole)	François Harvey			
Midnight at the Paradise	Vanessa Matsui			
Minus Twenty	Jack Parker			
Mistral Spatial	Marc-Antoine Lemire	Samuel Brassard, Catherine-Audrey Lachapelle		
Montreal Girls	Patricia Chica	Hakim Brahimi, Jade Hassouné, Jasmina Parent, Sana Asad, Nahéma Ricci		
Moonrise	Vincent Grenier			
Mother's Skin	Leah Johnston			
Municipal Relaxation Module	Matthew Rankin			
My Name Is Wolastoq (Ntoliwis Nil Wolastoq)	Nate Gaffney			
My Thoughts Exactly	Mike Archibald			
My Two Voices (Mis dos voces)	Lina Rodriguez			
Nanitic	Carol Nguyen			
The Newest Olds	Pablo Mazzolo			
Niagara	Guillaume Lambert	François Pérusse, Éric Bernier, Guy Jodoin		
Night Detour (Détour de nuit)	Ariane Falardeau St-Amour, Paul Chotel	Abdallah Touaïmia, Ricardo Flores Aguirre, Martine Francke		
A Night for the Dogs	Max Woodward			
Nightalk	Donald Shebib	Ashley Bryant, Al Mukadam, Art Hindle		
No Ghost in the Morgue	Marilyn Cooke	Schelby Jean-Baptiste		
Noemie Says Yes (Noémie dit oui)	Geneviève Albert			
Norbourg	Maxime Giroux	Vincent-Guillaume Otis, François Arnaud, Christine Beaulieu, Alexandre Goyette, Guy Thauvette		
North of Albany (Au nord d'Albany)	Marianne Farley	Céline Bonnier, Rick Roberts		
North of Normal	Carly Stone			
Not That Deep	Misha Maseka			
Nut Jobs (Les pas d'allure)	Alexandre Leblanc	Jean-Sébastien Courchesne, Sophie Desmarais		
N’xaxaitkw	Asia Youngman			
Oasis	Justine Martin	Raphaël Cormier, Rémi Cormier		
Offside: The Harold Ballard Story	Jason Priestley			
Okay!: The ASD Band Film	Mark Bone	The ASD Band		
The Origin of Evil (L'Origine du mal)	Sébastien Marnier	Laure Calamy, Jacques Weber, Dominique Blanc, Suzanne Clément		
Out in the Ring	Ry Levey	Chyna, Lisa Marie Varon, Nyla Rose, Chris Kanyon, Pat Patterson, Valerie Wyndham, Dani Jordyn, Cassandro, Charlie Morgan, Sandy Parker, Pollo Del Mar, Wade Keller		
Paco	Kent Donguines			
The Passing	Jackson Harvey			
Patty vs. Patty	Chris Strikes			
The Perfect Story	Michelle Shephard			
Phi 1.618	Theodore Ushev			
Piita Aapasskaan	Brock Davis Mitchell			
La Plage aux êtres	Kendra McLaughlin			
Pleasure Garden	Rita Ferrando			
Polaris	Kirsten Carthew			
The Pretendians	Drew Hayden Taylor, Paul Kemp			
Pro Pool (Piscine pro)	Alec Pronovost			
Projet Pigeons	Emmanuel Schwartz			
The Protector	Lenin M. Sivam	Chelsea Clark, Munro Chambers, Jasmin Geljo		
Queens of the Qing Dynasty	Ashley McKenzie	Sarah Walker, Ziyin Zheng		
Quiet Minds Silent Streets	Karen Chapman			
Quinn	Eva Colmers			
Rebecca's Room	Gillian McKercher			
Relax, I'm from the Future	Luke Higginson	Julian Richings, Rhys Darby, Gabrielle Graham		
Red House	Barry Doupé			
Reset	Min Bae			
Reste	Ginger Le Pêcheur			
Retrograde	Adrian Murray	Molly Reisman, Sofia Banzhaf		
REVIVAL69: The Concert That Rocked the World	Ron Chapman			
Riceboy Sleeps	Anthony Shim	Choi Seung Yoon, Ethan Hwang, Hunter Dillon		
Ride Above (Tempête)	Christian Duguay			
Rocket Fuel	Jessie Posthumus			
Rodeo	Joëlle Desjardins Paquette	Maxime Le Flaguais, Lilou Roy-Lanouette, Whitney Lafleur		
Rojek	Zaynê Akyol			
Rose	Roxann Whitebean			
Rosie	Gail Maurice	Keris Hope Hill, Melanie Bray, Constant Bernard, Alex Trahan		
Rumination	Ashleigh Vaillancourt			
The Runner	Amar Chebib			
Same Old	Lloyd Lee Choi			
SAVJ	Tank Standing Buffalo	Corey Feldman		
Scaring Women at Night	Karimah Zakia Issa	Izaiah Dockery, Kavita Musty, Dashawn Lloyd Blackwood		
Scrap	Stacey Tenenbaum			
The Secret Order (L'Ordre secret)	Phil Comeau			
Sexy Highland Stream	Nathan Adler			
Sikiitu	Gabriel Allard Gagnon			
Simo	Aziz Zoromba			
Slash/Back	Nyla Innuksuk	Tasiana Shirley, Alexis Wolfe, Nalajoss Ellsworth, Chelsea Prusky, Frankie Vincent-Wolfe		
So Much Tenderness	Lina Rodriguez	Noëlle Schönwald, Francisco Zaldua, Deragh Campbell		
Soft	Joseph Amenta			
Soft Spoken Weepy Cult Child	Irina Lord			
Something You Said Last Night	Luis De Filippis			
Square Peg	Christian Bunea			
Star Wars Kid: The Rise of the Digital Shadows (Dans l'ombre du Star Wars Kid)	Mathieu Fournier	Ghyslain Raza		
Stay the Night	Renuka Jeyapalan	Raymond Ablack, Andrea Bang		
Stellar	Darlene Naponse	Elle-Máijá Tailfeathers, Braeden Clark		
Summer with Hope	Sadaf Foroughi	Mehdi Ghorbani, Leili Rashidi, Benyamin Peyrovani		
The Swearing Jar	Lindsay MacKay	Adelaide Clemens, Patrick J. Adams, Douglas Smith, Kathleen Turner		
The Switch (La Switch)	Michel Kandinsky	François Arnaud, Lothaire Bluteau, Sophie Desmarais		
Tehranto	Faran Moradi	Sammy Azero, Mo Zeighami, Mahsa Ghorbankarimi, Ali Badshah		
The Temple (Le Temple)	Alain Fournier			
Terror/Forming	Rylan Friday			
That Kind of Summer (Un été comme ça)	Denis Côté	Larissa Corriveau, Laure Giappiconi, Aude Mathieu		
Theodore Ushev: Unseen Connections (Theodore Ushev : liens invisibles)	Borislav Kolev			
This House (Cette maison)	Miryam Charles	Ève Duranceau, Schelby Jean-Baptiste, Florence Blain Mbaye		
This Place	V. T. Nayani			
Three Times Nothing (Trois fois rien)	Nadège Loiseau	Antoine Bertrand, Philippe Rebbot, Côme Levin	Canada-France coproduction	
Tibi	Jarret Twoyoungmen			
Tidal	Chloe Van Landschoot			
The Time That Separates Us	Parastoo Anoushahpour			
To Kill a Tiger	Nisha Pahuja			
Tongue	Kaho Yoshida			
Tramps!	Kevin Hegge			
Triangle of Darkness (Triangle noir)	Marie-Noëlle Moreau Robidas			
Two Days Before Christmas (23 décembre)	Miryam Bouchard	François Arnaud, Christine Beaulieu, Catherine Brunet, Bianca Gervais		
Unloved: Huronia's Forgotten Children	Barri Cohen			
Until Branches Bend	Sophie Jarvis	Grace Glowicki, Lochlyn Munro		
Untold Hours	Daniel Warth			
Upwelling (Je me soulève)	Hugo Latulippe			
Vandits	Stuart Stone	Tony Nappo, Francesco Antonio, Jesse Camacho, Jann Arden, Enrico Colantoni		
Very Nice Day (Très belle journée)	Patrice Laliberté	Guillaume Laurin, Sarah-Jeanne Labrosse, Marc-André Grondin, Marc Beaupré, Christine Beaulieu, Mathieu Dufresne, Sandrine Bisson		
Viking	Stéphane Lafleur	Steve Laplante, Larissa Corriveau, Hamza Haq, Denis Houle, Marie Brassard		
Violet Gave Willingly	Claire Sanford			
Voices Across the Water	Fritz Mueller			
When Morning Comes	Kelly Fyffe-Marshall			
When Time Got Louder	Connie Cocchia	Willow Shields, Lochlyn Munro, Elizabeth Mitchell		
White Dog (Chien blanc)	Anaïs Barbeau-Lavalette	Kacey Rohl, Denis Ménochet, K. C. Collins		
Who Will Sing for Me?	Roger Bill, Tristram Clark			
A Woman Escapes	Sofia Bohdanowicz, Burak Çevik, Blake Williams			
The Work	Daniel MacIvor			
You Can Call Me Roger	Jon Mann			
You Can Live Forever	Sarah Watts, Mark Slutsky	Anwen O'Driscoll, June Laporte, Liane Balaban, Hasani Freeman, Antoine Yared, Deragh Campbell		
The Young Arsonists	Sheila Pye			
Zug Island	Nicolas Lachapelle			

== See also ==
- 2022 in Canada
- 2022 in Canadian television
