= 2022 in Canadian television =

The following is a list of events affecting Canadian television in 2022. Events listed include television show debuts, finales, cancellations, and channel launches, closures and rebrandings.

== Events ==
=== February ===
Date	Event	Source
27	In response to Russia's military action against Ukraine, Canadian major telecom companies Shaw, Rogers, Bell and Telus announced they would no longer offer Russian state-owned channel RT (formerly Russia Today) in their channel lineups, with Rogers replacing the RT broadcast with an image of the Ukrainian flag. This move was praised by Canada's Minister of Canadian Heritage Pablo Rodriguez who called the network the "propaganda arm" of Russian President Vladimir Putin.	

=== March ===
Date	Event	Source
1	Family CHRGD rebrands to WildBrainTV, with no change in format or positioning.	

=== November ===
Date	Event	Source
30	The Canadian Broadcasting Corporation launches CBC News Explore, a free ad-supported streaming television service offering a mixture of existing and new CBC news programming.	
30	Following the announcement earlier in 2022 that David Suzuki will retire from his longtime role as host of the documentary series The Nature of Things at the end of the 2022-23 season, the CBC announces that his successors will be Sarika Cullis-Suzuki and Anthony Morgan.	

=== December ===
Date	Event	Source
1	Corus Entertainment launches FAST service Pluto TV in Canada, in partnership with Paramount Global.	

== Programs ==
=== Programs debuting in 2022 ===
Start date	Show	Channel	Source
January 4	Son of a Critch	CBC Television	
January 5	Run the Burbs	CBC Television	
January 12	Children Ruin Everything	CTV	
January 12	Lost Car Rescue	History	
January 26	Astrid and Lilly Save the World	CTV Sci-Fi Channel	
February 10	Pillow Talk	Crave	
February 11	Best in Miniature	CBC Gem	
February 18	LOL: Last One Laughing Canada	Amazon Prime Video	
February 20	The Fabulous Show with Fay and Fluffy	Family Jr.	
February 21	The Porter	CBC Television	
February 26	BLK, An Origin Story	History	
March 17	CBX: Canadian Ballroom Extravaganza	CBC Arts	
April 11	DJ Burnt Bannock	APTN Lumi	
April 14	Le Temps des framboises	Club Illico	
April 18	Veg Headz	CTV Life Channel	
April 24	Abroad	OMNI	
April 27	Gut Job	HGTV	
April 30	We're All Gonna Die (Even Jay Baruchel)	Crave	
May	Sunshine City	TV1	
May 3	Dr. Savannah: Wild Rose Vet	APTN	
May 7	Lil Glooscap and the Legends of Turtle Island	APTN	
May 13	Shoresy	Crave	
May 13	Zarqa	CBC Gem	
June 4	Super Wish	YTV	
June 17	The Lake	Amazon Prime Video	
July 10	SkyMed	CBC Television	
August 7	La Drag en moi	Crave	
August 8	A Cut Above	Discovery	
August 12	Summer Memories	Family Channel	
August 23	J'ai frôlé la mort	Canal D	
August 23	Ma première maison	Canal Vie	
August 26	Priez pour nous	Canal D	
September 1	Fakes	CBC Gem	
September 5	Spice Secrets	CTV Life Channel	
September 6	Dine Your Sign	CTV Life Channel	
September 7	Au chalet de Rémi	Z	
September 13	Comedy Night with Rick Mercer	CBC Television	
September 12	Les Débatteurs de Noovo	Noovo	
September 14	Chouchou	Noovo	
September 14	Summit '72	CBC Television	
September 15	Bêtes de film	Canal D	
September 15	Le maître du jeu	Noovo	
September 16	Les Justiciers	Noovo	
September 23	Lido TV	CBC Gem	
September 26	Great Lakes Untamed	TVOntario	
October 5	Présumé innocent: L'Affaire France Alain	Crave, Canal D	
October 9	How I Got Here	Super Channel	
October 17	Acting Good	CTV Comedy Channel	
October 28	Urban Legend	CTV Sci-Fi Channel	
November 2	Cœurs migratoires	Canal Vie	
November 13	The Mightiest	Discovery	
November 16	Christine Morency: Sans filtre	Z	
November 18	Canada's Drag Race: Canada vs. the World	Crave	
November 21	Amour sans limites	Canal Vie	
November 24	The Night Logan Woke Up (La nuit où Laurier Gaudreault s'est réveillé)	Club Illico	
November 29	Comedy Invasion	AAM.tv	
December 2	Cocaine, Prison & Likes: Isabelle's True Story	Crave	
December 2	Stay Tooned	CBC Gem	
December 15	Cross Country Cake Off	CTV	
Unknown date	Mittens & Pants	CBC Gem	

=== Programs ending in 2022 ===
End date	Show	Channel	First aired	Status	Source
March 29	TallBoyz	CBC Television	2019	Ended	
April 7	Coroner	CBC Television	2019	Ended	
April 19	Political Blind Date	TVOntario	2017	Ended	
April 21	District 31	Ici Radio-Canada Télé	2016	Ended	
November 16	Diggstown	CBC Television	2019	Ended	

=== Specials ===
Start date	Show	Channel	Source
January 25	Come Clean	TVOntario	
April 10	10th Canadian Screen Awards	CBC Television	
May 15	Juno Awards of 2022	CBC Television	
June 5	24th Quebec Cinema Awards	Ici Radio-Canada Télé	
September 11	2022 Canadian Country Music Awards	Global	
September 22	Legacy Awards	CBC Television	
September 30	Buffy Sainte-Marie: Starwalker	CBC Television, APTN	
October 10	Sex with Sue	W Network	
October 18	The Perfect Story	TVO	
November 7	Kings of Coke	Crave	
November 20	109th Grey Cup	TSN	
December 11	The Holiday Sitter	W Network	

=== Shows returning in 2022 ===
The following shows will return with new episodes after being canceled or ended their run previously:

Show	Last aired	Type of return	Previous channel	New/returning/same channel	Return date	Source
The Kids in the Hall	1995	Revival	CBC	Amazon Prime Video	May 13	
Gary and His Demons	2018	Revival	VRV	Amazon Prime Video	Fall	

== Networks and services ==
=== Network conversions and rebrandings ===
Old network name	New network name	Type	Conversion date	Notes
Family CHRGD	WildBrainTV	Cable/Satellite	March 1	
DIY Network Canada	Magnolia Network Canada	Cable/satellite	March 28	

=== Closures ===
Network	Type	Closure date	Notes
Leafs Nation Network	Cable/satellite	August 31	

== Deaths ==
- May 5 – Kenneth Welsh, actor (Twin Peaks) (born 1942)
- September 8 – Elizabeth II, Queen of Canada (born 1926); her coronation was a landmark moment for Canadian television
- December 16 – Doreen Brownstone, English-born Canadian actress (High Life, Foodland, Silent Night) (born 1922)
