= 11th Canadian Screen Awards =

- Date: April 11–14, 2023 (Canadian Screen Week); April 16, 2023 (television broadcast)
- Location: Meridian Hall, Toronto, Ontario

Highlights
- Most awards: Film: Brother (12); TV: The Porter (12)
- Most nominations: Film: Brother (14); TV: The Porter (19)
- Best Motion Picture: Brother
- Best Dramatic Series: The Porter
- Best Comedy Series: Sort Of

Television/radio coverage
- Network: CBC Television

The 11th Canadian Screen Awards, presented by the Academy of Canadian Cinema & Television, honoured achievements in Canadian film, television and digital media production in 2022. The ceremonies were held at Meridian Hall in Toronto from April 11–14, 2023, as part of Canadian Screen Week, returning to an in-person ceremony for the first time since being suspended in 2020 due to the COVID-19 pandemic. Highlights of the ceremonies aired in a CBC Television special on April 16, 2023, hosted by Samantha Bee.

Nominees for all awards were announced on February 22, 2023. Brother led the film nominations, with 14 nods, while the CBC/BET+ drama The Porter led in television with 19 nods. Brother and The Porter would each win 12 awards, including the awards for best motion picture and dramatic series respectively.

== Ceremony information ==
After being held as a virtual event every year since 2020 due to the COVID-19 pandemic, the 2023 Canadian Screen Week festivities returned to being an in-person event. Genre-specific awards galas were hosted at Toronto's Meridian Hall from April 11–14.

Television coverage would consist of an hour-long special hosted by comedian Samantha Bee, which premiered April 16 on CBC Television. The special featured highlights of the non-televised galas, segments highlighting the special award recipients, and the results of the Audience Choice award vote. The previous year's ceremony used a similar format accompanying a series of streaming presentations throughout the week, but the results for top categories were reserved for the CBC special.

The new format was described as an attempt at making an entertainment-oriented special, given the ratings difficulties that traditional awards show telecasts have faced in recent years: producer Roma Ahi stated that there would be "more emphasis this time on storytelling than there would be during a live show where audiences are watching to see what people are wearing, what is said during acceptance speeches". Ahi's partner Katie Lafferty added that "we have to be entertainment-first, and the fun is in gathering what those moments could be from the various in-person ceremonies that happen earlier in the week."

The decision faced mixed reactions from several actors and filmmakers, most notably Eugene Levy, who felt that their achievements could potentially be overlooked (notwithstanding that even the live telecasts were unable to feature every single award due to time constraints).

=== Category changes ===
In August 2022, the academy announced that it would discontinue its past practice of presenting gendered awards for film and television actors and actresses; beginning in 2023, gender-neutral awards for Best Performance were presented, with eight nominees per category instead of five. Some of the other acting categories, notably those for guest performance, youth performance in children's programming, television films and web series performance were already gender-neutral.

Old category	New category
Best Actor	Best Lead Performance in a Film
Best Actress	Best Lead Performance in a Film
Best Supporting Actor	Best Supporting Performance in a Film
Best Supporting Actress	Best Supporting Performance in a Film
Best Actor in a Comedy Series	Best Leading Performance in a Comedy Series
Best Actress in a Comedy Series	Best Leading Performance in a Comedy Series
Best Actor in a Drama Series	Best Leading Performance in a Drama Series
Best Actress in a Drama Series	Best Leading Performance in a Drama Series
Best Supporting Actor in a Comedy Series	Best Supporting Performance in a Comedy Series
Best Supporting Actress in a Comedy Series	Best Supporting Performance in a Comedy Series
Best Supporting Actor in a Drama Program or Series	Best Supporting Performance in a Drama Program or Series
Best Supporting Actress in a Drama Program or Series	Best Supporting Performance in a Drama Program or Series

Other changes included the introduction of new categories for Best Original Music in a Documentary, Best Original Song in Television, Best Picture Editing - Children's or Youth and Best Writing - Pre-School, the splitting of television music and sound categories from a simple fiction/non-fiction distinction into several new categories for particular genres of fiction and non-fiction programming, and the introduction of a revised jury process for the John Dunning Best First Feature Award.

== Special awards ==
Recipients of the academy's special awards were announced on January 18, 2023.

- Board of Directors Tribute - Paul Pope, Jennifer Podemski
- Academy Icon - Catherine O'Hara
- Changemaker Award - Tracy Moore
- Earle Grey Award - Peter MacNeill
- Gordon Sinclair Award - Lisa LaFlamme
- Humanitarian Award - Ryan Reynolds
- Lifetime Achievement Award - Pierre Bruneau
- Radius Award - Simu Liu

== Film ==
Best Motion Picture	Best Direction
Brother — Damon D'Oliveira, Sonya Di Rienzo, Aeschylus Poulos, Clement Virgo; Babysitter — Martin Paul-Hus, Fabrice Lambot, Catherine Léger, Pierre-Marcel Blanchot; Falcon Lake — Sylvain Corbeil, Nancy Grant; Riceboy Sleeps — Anthony Shim, Rebecca Steele, Bryan Demore; Summer with Hope — Christina Piovesan, Kiarash Anvari, Sadaf Foroughi; Viking — Luc Déry, Kim McCraw	Clement Virgo, Brother; David Cronenberg, Crimes of the Future; Stéphane Lafleur, Viking; Charlotte Le Bon, Falcon Lake; Anthony Shim, Riceboy Sleeps
Best Lead Performance	Best Supporting Performance
Lamar Johnson, Brother; Choi Seung-yoon, Riceboy Sleeps; Monia Chokri, Babysitter; Larissa Corriveau, That Kind of Summer (Un été comme ça); Kelly Depeault, Noemie Says Yes (Noémie dit oui); Joseph Engel, Falcon Lake; Steve Laplante, Viking; Maxime Le Flaguais, Rodeo (Rodéo)	Aaron Pierre, Brother; Marsha Stephanie Blake, Brother; K. C. Collins, White Dog (Chien blanc); Jean-Luc Kanapé, Nouveau Québec; Mohammed Marouazi, Breathe (Respire); Sara Montpetit, Falcon Lake; Leili Rashidi, Summer with Hope; Nadia Tereszkiewicz, Babysitter
Best Original Screenplay	Best Adapted Screenplay
Anthony Shim, Riceboy Sleeps; Marie Clements, Bones of Crows; Sadaf Foroughi, Summer with Hope; Sophie Jarvis, Until Branches Bend; Stéphane Lafleur and Eric K. Boulianne, Viking	Clement Virgo, Brother; Charlotte Le Bon, Falcon Lake; Catherine Léger, Babysitter
Best Feature Length Documentary	Best Short Documentary
To Kill a Tiger — Nisha Pahuja, Cornelia Principe, David Oppenheim, Anita Lee, Atul Gawande; Batata — Paul Scherzer, Noura Kevorkian; Dear Audrey — Jeremiah Hayes, André Barro, Annette Clarke; Handle With Care: The Legend of the Notic Streetball Crew — Joey Haywood, Ryan Sidhoo, Jeremy Schaulin-Rioux, Kirk Thomas, Aron Phillips, Matt Aronson, Mark Starkey, Mario Soriano, Lizzy Karp; Zo Reken — Emanuel Licha	Patty vs. Patty — Chris Strikes, Kate Fraser, Maya Annik Bedward; The Benevolents (Les Bienvaillants) — Sarah Baril Gaudet; Bill Reid Remembers — Alanis Obomsawin, Annette Clarke; The Goats of Monesiglio — Emily Graves, Anna Cooley, Raj Dhillon; Perfecting the Art of Longing — Kitra Cahana, Kat Baulu, Ariel Nasr, Annette Clarke
Best Live Action Short Drama	Best Animated Short
Simo — Rosalie Chicoine Perreault, Aziz Zoromba; III — Salomé Villeneuve, Catherine Boily, Rosalie Chicoine Perreault; À la vie à l'amor — Lex Garcia, Léonie Hurtubise, Émilie Mannering; Mimine — Simon Laganière, Fanny Drew, Sarah Mannering; No Ghost in the Morgue — Marilyn Cooke, Kélyna N. Lauzier	The Flying Sailor — Wendy Tilby, Amanda Forbis, David Christensen; Arctic Song — Germaine Arnattaujuq, Neil Christopher, Louise Flaherty, Alicia Smith, David Christensen, Nadia Mike; Impossible Figures and Other Stories I — Marta Pajek, Piotr Szczepanowicz, Grzegorz Wacławek, Maral Mohammadian; The Shadow of My Life — Hajar Moradi; Triangle of Darkness (Triangle noir) — Marie-Noëlle Moreau Robidas, Nicolas Dufour-Laperrière
Best Art Direction/Production Design	Best Cinematography
Jason Clarke, John Kim and Richard Racicot, Brother; André-Line Beauparlant, Viking; Jennifer Morden, Alice, Darling; Dan Herrick and Zoë Woodrow, Cult Hero; Carol Spier, Crimes of the Future	Sara Mishara, Viking; Vincent Gonneville, Nouveau Québec; Douglas Koch, Crimes of the Future; Christopher Lew, Riceboy Sleeps; Keenan Lynch, Tehranto
Best Costume Design	Best Editing
Hanna Puley, Brother; Sig Burwash and Kathleen Darling, Queens of the Qing Dynasty; Carrie Cathrae-Keeling, Cult Hero; Sophie Lefebvre, Viking; Mayou Trikerioti, Crimes of the Future; Mara Zigler, Tenzin	Simone Smith, I Like Movies; Christopher Donaldson, Crimes of the Future; Sophie Leblond, Viking; Faran Moradi, Tehranto; Anthony Shim, Riceboy Sleeps
Best Sound Editing	Best Sound Mixing
Jane Tattersall, David McCallum, Paul Germann, Krystin Hunter and Kevin Banks, Brother; Sylvain Bellemare, Simon Meilleur, Frédéric Lavigne, Francis Gauthier and Claire Pochon, Viking; Elma Bello and Davi Aquino, Stay the Night; Robert Bertola, Tom Bjelic and Jill Purdy, Crimes of the Future; Martin Gwynn Jones, Dawn, Her Dad and the Tractor	Richard Penn, Joe Morrow and James Bastable, Brother; Pierre Bertrand and Bernard Gariépy Strobl, Viking; Matthew Chan, Stay the Night; Ron Mellegers, Justin Helle, Christian Cooke and Mark Zsifkovits, Crimes of the Future; Martin M. Messier, The Inhuman (L'Inhumain)
Best Original Score	Best Original Song
Todor Kobakov, Brother; Adrian Ellis, Cult Hero; Ian LeFeuvre, Ashgrove; Ari Posner, The End of Sex; Howard Shore, Crimes of the Future	Kate Hewlett, "The Swearing Song" — The Swearing Jar; Chuck Baker and Tony Burgess, "The Ascension Song" — Cult Hero; Marie Clements, Wayne Lavallee and Jesse Zubot, "You Are My Bones" — Bones of Crows; Rose Cousins and Breagh Isabel, "Get Home" — Dawn, Her Dad and the Tractor; Ian LeFeuvre, "The Weight" — Ashgrove
Best Makeup	Best Hair
Alexandra Anger and Monica Pavez, Crimes of the Future; Katie Ballantyne and Jonathan Craig, Cult Hero; Joan Chell, Brother; Marie-Josée Galibert, Viking; Darci Jackson and Elizabeth McLeod, Bones of Crows	Tremaine Thomas, Brother; Vincent Dufault, Viking; Charlene Dunn, Bones of Crows; Mykola Korolyov, The Swearing Jar
Best Cinematography in a Documentary	Best Editing in a Documentary
Nicholas de Pencier, The Colour of Ink; Noura Kevorkian, Batata; Katerine Giguère, Scrap; Jacquelyn Mills, Geographies of Solitude; Étienne Roussy, Zo Reken	Mike Munn and Dave Kazala, To Kill a Tiger; Jeremiah Hayes, Dear Audrey; Noura Kevorkian and Mike Munn, Batata; René Roberge, Bloom (Jouvencelles); Jeremy Schaulin-Rioux, Handle With Care: The Legend of the Notic Streetball Crew
Best Original Music in a Documentary	Best Visual Effects
Jonathan Goldsmith, To Kill a Tiger; Ramachandra Borcar, Scrap; Walker Grimshaw, Dear Audrey; Delphine Measroch, Humus; Edo Van Breemen and Johannes Winkler, Handle With Care: The Legend of the Notic Streetball Crew	Peter MacAuley, Kayden Anderson, Tom Turnbull and Caitlin Foster, Crimes of the Future; Landon Bootsma, Dexter Davey, Ashley Hampton, Milton Muller and Dmitry Vinnik, Until Branches Bend; Jean-François Ferland, Marie-Claude Lafontaine and Charles Lamoureux, Lines of Escape (Lignes de fuite); Eric Gambini, Sarah Krusch Flanagan, Louis Mackall, Virginie Strub, Andrew Joe, Gabriel Chiang and Linus Burghardt, Bones of Crows; Marc Hall, Babysitter; James Anthony Young, Cult Hero
John Dunning Best First Feature	Best Casting
Falcon Lake — Charlotte Le Bon; The Maiden — Graham Foy; Noemie Says Yes (Noémie dit oui) — Geneviève Albert; Rodeo (Rodéo) — Joëlle Desjardins Paquette; Wolves — Danny Dunlop	Deirdre Bowen, Brother; Deirdre Bowen, Crimes of the Future; John Buchan, Jason Knight and Mélanie Bray, Rosie; Nicole Hilliard-Forde and Matthew Lessall, The Swearing Jar; Lucie Robitaille, Viking
Golden Screen Award
Two Days Before Christmas (23 décembre)

== Television ==
=== Programs ===
Drama series	Comedy series
The Porter; Departure; Moonshine; SkyMed; Transplant	Sort Of; Astrid and Lilly Save the World; Children Ruin Everything; Fakes; Letterkenny
Animated program or series	Documentary program
The Snoopy Show; Big Blue; Denis and Me: Santa Who?; Summer Memories; Total Dramarama	Sex with Sue; Artificial Immortality; The Case Against Cosby; Kings of Coke; The Perfect Story
Children's or youth fiction	Children's or youth non-fiction
Detention Adventure; Holly Hobbie; Malory Towers; The Next Step; Odd Squad Mobile Unit	All-Round Champion; Gabby's Farm; Leo's Pollinators; Raven's Quest
Biography or Arts Documentary Program or Series	History Documentary Program or Series
The Kids in the Hall: Comedy Punks; Beautiful Scars; ET Canada Presents: Remembering Betty White; Indspire Awards 2022; Skindigenous	Underground Railroad: The Secret History; Esi Edugyan, Out of the Sun: The Massey Lectures; ET Canada Presents: Remembering Queen Elizabeth; Evil by Design: Surviving Nygard; Summit '72
Lifestyle Program or Series	Pre-School Program or Series
Mary Makes It Easy; The Big Sex Talk; Dr. Savannah: Wild Rose Vet; Gut Job; Rock Solid Builds	PAW Patrol; The Fabulous Show with Fay and Fluffy; Happy House of Frightenstein; Pikwik Pack; The Studio K Show: "Proud to Be Me!"
Reality/Competition series	Factual Program or Series
The Amazing Race Canada; Best in Miniature; Blown Away; Canada's Drag Race; A Cut Above	We're All Gonna Die (Even Jay Baruchel); Arctic Vets; How I Got Here; Lost Car Rescue; Never Seen Again
Science or Nature Documentary Program or Series (Rob Stewart Award)	Social/Political Documentary Program (Donald Brittain Award)
The Nature of Things: "Ice and Fire: Tracking Canada's Climate Crisis"; The Mightiest; The Nature of Things: "Carbon: The Unauthorized Biography"; The Nature of Things: "Curb Your Carbon"; The Nature of Things: "Nature's Big Year"	The Pretendians; Come Clean; Dear Jackie; Marketplace: "Crisis in Home Care"; My Indian Name
Sketch comedy program or series	Variety or entertainment special
TallBoyz; Abroad; Roast Battle Canada; This Hour Has 22 Minutes	eTalk Presents Impact and Influence: A Truth and Reconciliation Day Special; Dave Merheje: I Love You Habibi; ET Canada Presents: One on One with Trevor Noah; FreeUp! The Emancipation Day Special; Toronto Santa Claus Parade
Talk program or series	Performing arts program
1 Queen 5 Queers; ET Canada Presents: Forward, the Future of Black Entertainment; ET Canada Presents: Indigenous Artists and Icons, Celebrating the Future; The Marilyn Denis Show; The Social	Buffy Sainte-Marie: Starwalker; Freedom Talks; Three Tall Women; Winnipeg Comedy Festival
TV movie	Entertainment news program or series
Swindler Seduction; A Chance for Christmas; Miracle in Motor City; Saying Yes to Christmas; Under the Christmas Tree	eTalk; Entertainment Tonight Canada; ET Presents Icons: Oprah Celebrates Sidney
Live entertainment special
Juno Awards of 2022; 2021 Giller Prize; 2022 Legacy Awards

=== Actors ===
Lead performance, drama	Supporting performance, drama
Hamza Haq, Transplant; Aml Ameen, The Porter; Jennifer Finnigan, Moonshine; Laurence Leboeuf, Transplant; Mayko Nguyen, Hudson & Rex; John Reardon, Hudson & Rex; Ronnie Rowe Jr., The Porter; Mouna Traoré, The Porter	Christopher Plummer, Departure; Thom Allison, Coroner; Wendy Crewson, Departure; Kevin Hanchard, Hudson & Rex; Karen LeBlanc, Departure; Daniel Maslany, Murdoch Mysteries; Andy McQueen, Coroner; Dwain Murphy, Diggstown
Lead performance, comedy	Supporting performance, comedy
Bilal Baig, Sort Of; Dani Kind, Workin' Moms; Meredith MacNeill, Pretty Hard Cases; Adrienne C. Moore, Pretty Hard Cases; Rakhee Morzaria, Run the Burbs; Andrew Phung, Run the Burbs; Meaghan Rath, Children Ruin Everything; Catherine Reitman, Workin' Moms	Ennis Esmer, Children Ruin Everything; Tricia Black, Pretty Hard Cases; Amanda Cordner, Sort Of; Malcolm McDowell, Son of a Critch; Sarah McVie, Workin' Moms; Al Mukadam, Pretty Hard Cases; Enuka Okuma, Workin' Moms; Karen Robinson, Pretty Hard Cases
Performance in a television film or miniseries	Performance in a children's or youth program or series
Martha Henry, Three Tall Women; Gil Bellows, Two Deaths of Henry Baker; Tori Anderson, Campfire Christmas; Holly Deveaux, Christmas Movie Magic; Sarah Drew, Stolen by Their Father; Erica Durance, Color My World with Love; Gabrielle Graham, Swindler Seduction; Jenny Raven, Love at Sky Gardens	Saara Chaudry, Holly Hobbie; Lilly Bartlam, Detention Adventure; Melanie Doane, Ukulele U; Jack Fulton, Detention Adventure; Alyssa Hidalgo, Odd Squad Mobile Unit; Simone Miller, Detention Adventure; Alina Prijono, Detention Adventure; Tomaso Sanelli, Detention Adventure
Performance in a guest role in a comedy series	Performance in a guest role in a drama series
Amanda Brugel, Sort Of; Rodrigo Fernandez-Stoll, Son of a Critch; Anna Hopkins, Letterkenny; Kardinal Offishall, Run the Burbs; Jonathan Torrens, Letterkenny	Alfre Woodard, The Porter; Natalie Brown, Hudson & Rex; Allan Hawco, Moonshine; Jonathan Torrens, Moonshine; Jo Vannicola, Diggstown
Performance in an animated program or series	Performance in a variety or sketch comedy program or series
Tricia Black, Summer Memories; Julius Cho, Agent Binky: Pets of the Universe; Glee Dango, Thomas & Friends: All Engines Go; Melody Johnson, Agent Binky: Pets of the Universe; Hattie Kragten, The Snoopy Show	Mark Critch, Trent McClellan, Aba Amuquandoh and Stacey McGunnigle, This Hour Has 22 Minutes; Guled Abdi, Tim Blair, Vance Banzo and Franco Nguyen, TallBoyz; Nicola Correia-Damude, Adam DiMarco, Carlos Gonzalez-Vio, Sydney Scotia, Gregory Prest, Paolo Santalucia, Chris Robinson, Kwasi Thomas, Andrew Wheeler, Sharon Crandall and Vanessa Lauren Fox, Pillow Talk; Russell Peters, Sabrina Jalees, K. Trevor Wilson, Ennis Esmer, Salma Hindy, Sophie Buddle, Ron Josol and Jean Paul, Roast Battle Canada

=== News and information ===
News special	News information series
CBC News Network, Breaking News Special: Ottawa Occupation; CTV News, Pope Francis in Canada; CBC News, Pope Francis in Canada: Maskwacis Apology	The Fifth Estate; APTN Investigates; The New Reality; W5
National newscast	Local newscast
Global National; APTN National News; CTV National News; The National	Global News Hour at 6; CBC News Compass; CBC News Vancouver at 6; CityNews Toronto; CTV News Toronto at 6
News anchor, national	News anchor, local
Dawna Friesen, Global National; Adrienne Arsenault, Ian Hanomansing and Andrew Chang, The National; Lisa LaFlamme, CTV National News	Anita Bathe, CBC News Vancouver at 6; Nathan Downer and Michelle Dubé, CTV News Toronto at 6; Dwight Drummond, CBC News Toronto at 6; Sam Maciag, CBC News Saskatchewan
News reporter, national	News reporter, local
Juanita Taylor, The National; Chris Brown, The National; Jeff Semple, Global National	Caroline Barghout, CBC News Winnipeg; Michelle Ghoussoub, CBC News Vancouver; Cynthia Mulligan, CityNews; Sean O'Shea, Global News Toronto
News or information program	News or information segment
APTN Investigates: "In Plain Sight"; Arctic Blue with Peter Mansbridge; CTV News: "Reporter's Notebook: Paul Workman in Afghanistan"; The Fifth Estate: "Finding School 4: WE Charity's Donor Deception in Kenya"	W5: "The Humboldt Driver"; Indigenous Day Live 2021: "A Nation and Her Mother"; The National: "Kidnapped by a Nun: Residential School Survivor Story"; The National: "Kidney Donation"; The New Reality: "Rights of Nature"
Host or interviewer, news or information program or series	Host, talk show or entertainment news
Avery Haines, W5; Cyril Chauquet, Last of the Giants; Peter Mansbridge, Arctic Blue with Peter Mansbridge; Drew Hayden Taylor, Going Native; Rick Westhead, That's Hockey	Tom Power, Juno Awards of 2022 Pre-Show; Cheryl Hickey, ET Canada Presents Icons: Oprah Celebrates Sidney; Vassy Kapelos, Power & Politics; Tracy Moore, CityLine; Madison Tevlin, Who Do You Think I Am?
Host or presenter, factual or reality/competition	Host, live entertainment special
Brooke Lynn Hytes, Brad Goreski and Traci Melchor, Canada's Drag Race; Arisa Cox, Big Brother Canada; Jonny Harris, Still Standing; Howie Mandel, Lilly Singh, Kardinal Offishall, Trish Stratus and Lindsay Ell, Canada's Got Talent; Ann Pornel and Alan Shane Lewis, The Great Canadian Baking Show	Simu Liu, Juno Awards of 2022; Rupi Kaur and Paul Sun-Hyung Lee, 2021 Scotiabank Giller Prize; Shamier Anderson and Stephan James, 2022 Legacy Awards
Host, lifestyle	Morning show
Drew Scott and Jonathan Silver Scott, Property Brothers: Forever Home; Nicole Babb and Caffery Vanhorne, Styled; Bryan Baeumler and Sarah Baeumler, Island of Bryan; Chuck Hughes, Chuck and the First Peoples Kitchen; Scott McGillivray, Scott's Vacation House Rules	CBC Morning Live with Heather Hiscox; Breakfast Television; Global News Morning: Edmonton Edition; Your Morning

=== Sports ===
Live sporting event coverage	Sports analyst
2022 IIHF World Junior Gold Medal Game on TSN; 2021 Grey Cup on TSN; 2022 Stanley Cup Final Game 6 on Sportsnet	Craig Simpson, Hockey Night in Canada; Arianne Jones, 2022 Beijing Winter Olympic Games on CBC; Cheryl Pounder, 2022 IIHF Women's World Championship; Joe Siddall, Blue Jays Central
Sports host	Sports play-by-play
Andi Petrillo, 2022 Beijing Winter Olympic Games on CBC; James Duthie, TSN Free Agent Frenzy; Ron MacLean, Hockey Night in Canada; Jay Onrait, SC with Jay Onrait	Gord Miller, 2022 IIHF World Junior Gold Medal Game on TSN; Chris Cuthbert, Hockey Night in Canada; Brenda Irving, 2022 Winter Olympics; Dan Shulman, Blue Jays Central
Sports program or series	Sports feature segment
2022 Beijing Winter Olympic Games on CBC; SportsCentre; Tim & Friends	Josh Shiaman, Rick Westhead, Nigel Akam, Darren Oliver and Michael Banani, "Left Behind" — TSN; Rob Dunn, Adam Fair, Kevin Fallis and Jason Wessel, "High Heat: Alli Schroder Story" — TSN; Tracy Britnell, Devon Burns, Owen Ewers, Richard Liani, Adam Parsons and David Midgley, "Naked" — TSN; Josh Shiaman, Farhan Lalji, Jacob Frenkel, Michael Banani and Jason Wessel, "Pivot: The Sheldon Guy Story" — TSN
Sports opening
Simon Garan, Jacob Frenkel, Kevin Fallis and James Judges, 2021 Toronto Raptors Season Opener on TSN; Matt Dorman, Darren Oliver, Kevin Fallis, Devon Burns and Curry Leaman, 2021 Grey Cup on TSN; Tim Thompson, Chris Irwin and Jeff Shelegy, 2022 Beijing Winter Olympic Games on CBC; Tim Thompson and Jeff Shelegy, 2022 Beijing Winter Olympic Games Women's Gold Medal Hockey Game on CBC

=== Craft awards ===
Editorial research	Visual research
Victoria Lean, Jackie Carlos, Rita Kotzia, Britt Wray, Stuart Henderson, Ben Travers and Simone Zucker, We're All Gonna Die (Even Jay Baruchel): "Asteroid Armageddon"; Jackie Carlos, Chef Secrets: The Science of Cooking; Barri Cohen and Jessica Joy Wise, Unloved: Huronia's Forgotten Children; Kathy Grant and Lola Waheed, Black Liberators WWII; Madison Thomas and Andrea Warner, Buffy Sainte-Marie: Carry It On	Kenya-Jade Pinto and Erin Chisholm, Black Liberators WWII; Barri Cohen and Jessica Joy Wise, Unloved: Huronia's Forgotten Children; Elspeth Domville, The Case Against Cosby; Jessica Joy Wise, Bailey Johnson, Jennifer Dysart, Joan Prowse, Connie Littlefield and Allison Wolfe, Buffy Sainte-Marie: Carry It On; Cindy Wolfe and Emma Kehayas, The Kids in the Hall: Comedy Punks
Make-Up	Hair
Tracy George, Krista Hann and Alisha Talbot, The Porter: "Episode 102"; Lauren Cavanaugh, Holly Hobbie: "The Friendship Fiasco"; Deb Drennan, Murdoch Mysteries: "Rawhide Ralph"; Kate Minnis, Haunted Hospitals: "The Gift, Room 19, The Cooler"; Dorota Mitoraj and Sasha Pawluk, Coroner: "Death Goes On"	Heather Streilein and Tremaine Thomas, The Porter: "Episode 102"; Shirley Bond and Toni Mastropietro, Murdoch Mysteries: "Patriot Games"; Norma Richard, Son of a Critch: "Save the Last Dance for Me"; Zinka Tuminski, Strays: "Mama Madness"
Costume design	Visual effects
Heather Neale, The Porter: "Episode 102"; Nicole Manek, Pretty Hard Cases: "Pencil Skirts"; Crystal Silden, Sort Of: "Sort Of 2gethr"; Joanna Syrokomla, Murdoch Mysteries: "The Night Before Christmas"; Lisa Williams, Big Brother Canada: "Premier"	Joe Kicak and Sebastian Harder, Detention Adventure: "Negative Space"; Matthew J.R. Bishop, Nial McFadyen, Susan Sullivan, Cody McCaig, Stephen Curran, James Wallace, Jeff Robinson, Belma Abdicevic, Tom Perry and Steve Lowry, Odd Squad Mobile Unit: "Odd Together Now"; Jonathon Corbiere, Flavio de Paula, Julia Nadeau, Steve Murphy, Suzanna Brusikiewicz and Tyler Sammy, History by the Numbers: "The Roaring 20s"; Alex Nadon, 2022 Legacy Awards; Andy Powell and Raymond Pang, Super Wish: "The Floor Is Definitely Not Lava"
Production design/art direction in a fiction program or series	Production design/art direction in a non-fiction program or series
Réjean Labrie, Jon Van Winkle and Sara McCudden, The Porter: "Episode 101"; Bill Fleming, Moonshine: "44.6304N 64.0515W"; Ingrid Jurek, M-A Orenstein and Jenn Luckas, Sort Of: "Sort Of Janazah"; Bob Sher, Murdoch Mysteries: "The Night Before Christmas"; Brian Verhoog, Joel Guzman, Brianna Trush and Andrew Hill, The Hardy Boys: "An Unexpected Return"	Andrew Kinsella, Canada's Drag Race: "Sidewalk to Catwalk"; Peter Faragher, Andy Roskaft, Kevin Halliday and Aaron Scholl, Big Brother Canada: "Premier"; Callum Maclachlan and Mark Hockin, Hockey Night in Canada; Alex Nadon, Juno Awards of 2022; Michael “Spike” Parks and Mike Gelinas, The Great Canadian Baking Show: "The Great Canadian Holiday Baking Show"
Casting, fiction	Casting, non-fiction
Andrea Kenyon, Randi Wells, Jason Knight and John Buchan, Transplant; Sharon Forrest, Pretty Hard Cases; Jenny Lewis and Sara Kay, Children Ruin Everything; Jenny Lewis and Sara Kay, Letterkenny; Larissa Mair, Run the Burbs	Heather Muir, Canada's Drag Race; Tanner Sawatzky, Race Against the Tide; Jesse Storey and Michael Yerxa, The Amazing Race Canada; Meredith Veats, The Great Canadian Baking Show; Michael Yerxa, 1 Queen 5 Queers

=== Photography ===
Photography in a comedy series	Photography in a documentary program or factual series
Kristin Fieldhouse, Pretty Hard Cases: "Pencil Skirts"; Ben Lichty, Workin' Moms: "Grow If You Want"; Tim Mombourquette, Vollies: "Skunk in the Trunk"; Iris Ng, Strays: "House Sitting"; Gayle Ye, Detention Adventure: "Singing in the Raign"	Ricardo Diaz, BLK, An Origin Story: "Nova Scotia: Three Epic Migrations, One People"; Maya Bankovic, Crystal Pite: Angels' Atlas; Iris Ng and Stephen Chung, Artificial Immortality; Ken Ng, The Passionate Eye: "The Talented Mr. Rosenberg"; Lulu Wei and Ann Tipper, Sex with Sue
Photography in a drama program or series	Photography in a lifestyle or reality program or series
Jordan Oram, The Porter: "Episode 108"; D. Gregor Hagey, The Hardy Boys: "An Unexpected Return"; Ken LeBlanc, Diggstown: "Donald Kitpu Christmas"; Samy Inayeh, Coroner: "Cutting Corners"; Yuri Yakubiw, Murdoch Mysteries: "The Incorrigible Dr. Ogden"	Kevin C. W. Wong, Mary Makes It Easy: "BBQ's and A's"; David Baron, Dr. Savannah: Wild Rose Vet: "Purple Saxifrage Vet"; Alysha Galbreath, The Fabulous Show with Fay and Fluffy: "I Love Where I Come From"; Shane Geddes, Best in Miniature: "Cakes & Dining"; Kevin Kossowan, Les Stroud's Wild Harvest: "Wild Ginger & Miner's Lettuce"
Photography in a news or information program, series or segment
Marc D'Amours, CTV News: "Reporter's Notebook: Paul Workman in Afghanistan"; Kirk Neff, W5: "Where's Dylan?"; Brent Rose, The New Reality: "Rights of Nature"; John Minh Tran, Arctic Blue with Peter Mansbridge

=== Editing ===
Editing in a comedy program or series	Editing in a dramatic program or series
Marianna Khoury, Sort Of: "Sort Of 2gethr"; Hugh Elchuk, Sort Of: "Sort Of Amsterdam"; Marianna Khoury, Workin' Moms: "Grow If You Want"; Kyle Martin, Letterkenny: "Dyck Meat"; Kyle Martin, Shoresy: "Don't Poke the Bear"	Sandy Pereira, The Porter: "Episode 101"; Teresa de Luca, Coroner: "LJND"; Annie Ilkow, Transplant: "Rumination"; Kimberlee McTaggart, Moonshine: "44.6304N 64.0515W"; Dev Singh, The Porter: "Episode 108"
Editing in a children's or youth program or series	Editing in a documentary program or series
Al Manson, All-Round Champion: "Hockey"; Courtney Goldman and Nathan Martinak, Odd Squad Mobile Unit: "The Problem With Pentagurps / Three Portals Down"; Joe Kicak and Mike Lobel, Detention Adventure: "First Impressionisms"; Jane MacRae, Holly Hobbie: "The Aspiring Ally"; Sabrina Pitre, Fakes: "Teen Drinking is very bad..."	Avril Jacobson, BLK, An Origin Story: "Vancouver: Hogan's Alley"; Erin Gulas and Nick Taylor, Sex with Sue; Dave McMahon, The Kids in the Hall: Comedy Punks; Barry McMann, Pamela Bayne, Peter Denes and Nathan Shields, Evil by Design: Surviving Nygard; Marc Ricciardelli, Taylor G. McConnachie and Katie Flach, Beautiful Scars
Editing in a factual program or series	Editing in a reality or competition program or series
Kirk Ramsay and Nick Taylor, We're All Gonna Die (Even Jay Baruchel): "Asteroid Armageddon"; Anna Bigos, Arctic Vets: "Mom and Cubs Polar Bear Rescue"; Derek Esposito, How I Got Here: "Zimbabwe: She Has Arrived"; Mike Langevin, Jordan Lavigne, Tim Thompson and Ken Yan, National Day of Truth and Reconciliation; Vitold Vidic, How I Got Here: "Serbia: Two Rivers Intertwined"	Michael Tersigni and Samantha Shields, The Amazing Race Canada: "Where Is Gurmail"; Swapna Mella and Lara Mrkoci, The Great Canadian Baking Show: "Patisserie Week"; Lindsay Ragone, Canada's Drag Race: "Masquerade Ball"; Peter Topalovic, Canada's Drag Race: "Sidewalk to Catwalk"; Jordan Wood and Alex Mastronardi, Wall of Bakers: "Cookies for the Win"

=== Sound ===
Sound in a fiction program or series	Sound in a documentary or factual program or series
Mario Auclair, Sylvain Brassard, Christian Rivest, Guy Pelletier, Claude Champagne, Guy Francoeur, Gaël Poisson-Lemay, Simon Pelletier and Simon-Pierre Fortin Leclerc, Transplant: "Rumination"; Ed Douglas, David McCallum, Marvyn Dennis, Peter Thillaye, Stef Fraticelli, Jason Charbonneau, Martin Lee, Graham Rogers and Russ Dyck, The Porter: "Episode 108"; Paul Germann, Martin Gwynn Jones, Rob Ainsley, Bryan Day, Graham Rogers, Goro Koyama and Jenna Dalla Riva, Sort Of: "Sort Of Future"; Janice Ierulli, Mark Shnuriwsky, Matthew Hussey, Dave Johnson, Marco Döelle, Harvey Hyslop, Hilary Thomson and Matthew Thomson, Hudson & Rex: "No Man Is an Island"; Graham Rogers, Stacy Coutts, Sue Conley, Paul Germann and Zenon Waschuk, Pretty Hard Cases: "Pigeon Party"	Stephen Paniccia, Kane Kirton and Daniel Pellerin, Buffy Sainte-Marie: Carry It On; Stéphane Barsalou, Lynne Trépanier, Catherine Van Der Donckt and Benoît Dame, Dear Jackie; Matt Drake and Devon Cooke, Doug and the Slugs and Me; Michael Josselyn and Matthew McKenzie, Magic Shadows, Elwy Yost: A Life in Movies; Graham Rogers, Stefana Fratila, Krystin Hunter and Dane Kelly, Crystal Pite: Angels' Atlas
Sound in a lifestyle, reality or entertainment program or series	Sound in an animated program or series
John Diemer, Scott Brachmayer, Rosie Eberhard, Levi Linton, Rob Taylor, Alastair Sims and Eric Leigh, Canada's Drag Race: "Girls Trip: The Rusical"; Peter Hamilton, Blown Away: "The Bigger the Better"; Mark Krupka, Brian Gallant and Lisa Meitin, The Amazing Race Canada: "Is That a Wild Peacock?"; Mark Vreeken, Jeff Kozak and Doug McClement, Buffy Sainte-Marie: Starwalker; Mark Vreeken, Jeff Kozak, Charles-Emile Beaudin and Doug McClement, Juno Awards of 2022	Richard Spence-Thomas, Tim Muirhead, Mitch Connors, Luke Dante, Kyle Peters, Ryan Ongaro and Patton Rodrigues, PAW Patrol: "Rescue Knights: Quest for the Dragon's Tooth"; Ryan Araki, Evan Turner, Neil Parfitt, Andrew McDonnell and Richard Spence-Thomas, Super Wish: "Taste Buddies / Imagination Caboose"; Ryan Araki, John Baktis, Andrew McDonnell and Simon Berry, Thomas & Friends: All Engines Go: "Music is Everywhere / Backwards Day"; Ryan Araki, John Baktis, Andrew McDonnell and Simon Berry, Thomas & Friends: All Engines Go: "Race for the Sodor Cup"; Todd Araki, Andrew Downton, Marcel Duperreault, Jason Fredrickson and Adam McGhie, The Snoopy Show: "Happiness Is Your Favourite Thing"

=== Directing ===
Animation	Children's or youth
Charles E. Bastien, PAW Patrol: "Rescue Knights: Quest for the Dragon's Tooth"; Darren Cranford, Happy House of Frightenstein: "Heirloom Doom"; Riccardo Durante, Big Blue: "Fraidy Phil"; Wayne-Michael Lee, Pinecone & Pony: "What Would Freda Do? / A Token of Toughness"; Keith Oliver and George Elliott, Total Dramarama: "Total Trauma Rama / The Doomed Ballooned Marooned"	Melanie Orr, The Hardy Boys: "The Doctor's Orders"; Romeo Candido, The Next Step: "One Song Glory"; Graeme Lynch, All-Round Champion: "Hurdles"; Bruce McDonald, Malory Towers: "The New Headmistress"; Warren P. Sonoda, Odd Squad Mobile Unit: "Odd Together Now"
Comedy	Drama
Fab Filippo, Sort Of: "Sort Of Janazah"; Yael Staav, Workin' Moms: "The Big One"; Jacob Tierney, Shoresy: "Don't Poke the Bear"; Joyce Wong, Sort Of: "Sort Of I Love You"; Aleysa Young, Run the Burbs: "Blockbuster"	Charles Officer, The Porter: "Episode 101"; Cory Bowles, Coroner: "Our Home on Native Land"; Cory Bowles, Diggstown: "Donald Kitpu Christmas"; Gloria Ui Young Kim, Heartland: "The Long Game"; R.T. Thorne, The Porter: "Episode 108"
Documentary program	Documentary series
Madison Thomas, Buffy Sainte-Marie: Carry It On; Shane Belcourt, Beautiful Scars; Barri Cohen, Unloved: Huronia's Forgotten Children; Lisa Rideout, Sex with Sue; Karen Shopsowitz, Magic Shadows, Elwy Yost: A Life in Movies	Jennifer Holness, BLK, An Origin Story: "Nova Scotia: Three Epic Migrations, One People"; Robin Bicknell, The Nature of Things: "Ice and Fire: Tracking Canada's Climate Crisis"; Robin Bicknell, The Nature of Things: "The Machine That Feels"; Reginald Harkema, The Kids in the Hall: Comedy Punks; Guyleigh Johnson, Jodell Stundon, Tyus McSween and Deborah Castrilli, Being Black in Halifax
Lifestyle or information	Live sporting event
Jan McCharles, Mary Makes It Easy: "BBQ's and A's"; John Keffer, The Marilyn Denis Show: "Marilyn Rocks Halloween"; Jim MacPherson, Property Brothers: Forever Home: "Jodi & Mel"; Harbinder Singh, Raufikat's Better Bake Along: "Toasty Pineapple Pastries"; Les Stroud and Kevin Kossowan, Les Stroud's Wild Harvest: "Mussels & Wild Radish"	John Szpala, 2022 Stanley Cup Final Game 6 on Sportsnet; Andy Bouyoukos, 2021 Grey Cup on TSN; Dawn Landis, 2022 IIHF Women's World Championship
Factual	Reality/competition
Victoria Lean, We're All Gonna Die (Even Jay Baruchel): "Asteroid Armageddon"; Sebastien Cluer, Still Standing: "St. Laurent, MB"; Michelle Mama, Lost Car Rescue: "Muscle Cars"; Andrew Murray, Still Standing: "Wakefield, QC"; Jeff Thrasher, Arctic Vets: "Mom and Cubs Polar Bear Rescue"	Shelagh O'Brien, Canada's Drag Race: "Girls Trip: The Rusical"; Rob Brunner, The Amazing Race Canada: "Where Is Gurmail"; Graeme Lynch, Race Against the Tide: "Night Terrors"; Dave Russell, The Great Canadian Baking Show: "The Great Canadian Holiday Baking Show"; Frank Samson, Blown Away: "The Bigger the Better"
TV movie	Variety or sketch comedy program or series
Lisa Rose Snow, Under the Christmas Tree; Alfons Adetuyi, Miracle in Motor City; Barry Avrich, Three Tall Women; Siobhan Devine, Imperfect High; Samantha Wan, Love at Sky Gardens	Bruce McCulloch, TallBoyz: "Don't swear in front of the song"; Jocelyn Corkum and Allison Johnston, This Hour Has 22 Minutes: "Comedy Convoy"; Shelagh O'Brien, Comedy Night with Rick Mercer: "Episode 105"; Shelagh O'Brien, Roast Battle Canada: "Episode 201"; Dave Russell, Juno Awards of 2022

=== Music ===
Best Original Music, Comedy	Best Original Music, Drama
Ceréna, Emily Persich, Moël, Terrell Morris, Shan Vincent de Paul and Vivek Shraya, Sort Of; Ames Bessada, Astrid and Lilly Save the World; Alan Doyle and Keith Power, Son of a Critch; Ari Posner, Amin Bhatia, Sarah Slean and Antonio Naranjo, Detention Adventure; John Rowley, Pretty Hard Cases	Jonathan Goldsmith, The Porter; Lora Bidner and Robert Carli, Ruby and the Well; Gary Koftinoff and Philip J. Bennett, Hudson & Rex; Keith Power, Departure; Tom Third, Coroner
Best Original Music, Animation	Best Original Music, Documentary
Ari Posner, Amin Bhatia and Kris Kuzdak, Let's Go Luna!; Brian Chan and Caleb Chan, Pinecone & Pony; Brian Chan and Caleb Chan, Team Zenko Go; Jeff Morrow, The Snoopy Show; Neil Parfitt, Super Wish	Tom Third, BLK, An Origin Story; Ohad Benchetrit and Justin Small, The Perfect Story; Ramachandra Borcar, Dear Jackie; Todor Kobakov, Artificial Immortality; Michelle Osis, Unloved: Huronia's Forgotten Children
Best Original Music, Factual, Lifestyle, Reality or Entertainment	Best Original Song
Rachael Johnstone, Annelise Noronha, Jason Turriff and Earl Torno, A Cut Above; Guillaume Coutu Dumont, Eat Me (Or Try Not To); Derek Miller, Friday Night Thunder; Joseph Shabason, Open Fire; Les Stroud, Kevin Kossowan and David Bateman, Les Stroud's Wild Harvest	Jonathan Goldsmith and Kaia Kater, "Songbird" — The Porter; Creighton Doane, Melanie Doane and Bob Ezrin, "Use Your Outside Voice" — Ukulele U; Antonio Naranjo and Carla Sutton, "No Place Like Home" — Detention Adventure; Antonio Naranjo and Carla Sutton, "See You Later" — Detention Adventure; Emily Persich, "Superpowers" — Sort Of

=== Writing ===
Children's or youth	Comedy
Ramona Barckert, The Hardy Boys: "Captured"; Carmen Albano, Detention Adventure: "First Impressionisms"; Amy Cole, The Next Step: "One Song Glory"; Joe Kicak, Detention Adventure: "See You Later"; Lisa Rose Snow, Detention Adventure: "Pranks, Lies and Videotape"	Bilal Baig and Fab Filippo, Sort Of: "Sort Of I Love You"; JP Larocque, Sort Of: "Sort Of Broke"; Catherine Reitman, Workin' Moms: "Grow If You Want"; Kurt Smeaton, Children Ruin Everything: "Road Trip"; Kurt Smeaton and Jessica Meya, Children Ruin Everything: "Space"
Documentary	Drama
Sudz Sutherland, BLK, An Origin Story: "Ontario: John 'Daddy' Hall"; Lisa Rideout, Sex with Sue; Karen Shopsowitz, Magic Shadows, Elwy Yost: A Life in Movies; Drew Hayden Taylor, Paul Kemp and Jonathan Baltrusaitis, The Pretendians; Madison Thomas and Andrea Warner, Buffy Sainte-Marie: Carry It On	Marsha Greene, The Porter: "Episode 104"; Joseph Kay and Rachel Langer, Transplant: "Tariq"; Adriana Maggs, Coroner: "Death Goes On"; Annmarie Morais and Aubrey Nealon, The Porter: "Episode 101"; Carmine Pierre-Dufour, Transplant: "Unstuck in Time"
Factual	Lifestyle or reality/competition
Jonny Harris, Fraser Young, Graham Chittenden and Steve Dylan, Still Standing: "Oxford, NS"; Samantha Beck, Katie Redburn and Gillian Mahoney, Rust Valley Restorers: "Scorched Earth"; Armen Kazazian, A Ghost Ruined My Life: "Newlywed Nightmare"; Victoria Lean, We're All Gonna Die (Even Jay Baruchel): "Asteroid Armageddon"; Jeff Thrasher, Arctic Vets: "Mom and Cubs Polar Bear Rescue"	Brandon Ash-Mohammed, Trevor Boris, Spencer Fritz and Kevin Hazlehurst, Canada's Drag Race: "Girls' Trip: The Rusical"; Rob Brunner, Mark Lysakowski and Josh Tizel, The Amazing Race Canada: "Is That a Wild Peacock?"; Nadine Djoury, The Great Canadian Baking Show: "Bread Week"; Elvira Kurt, A Cut Above: "Episode 109"; Carly Spencer, Race Against the Tide: "Race Against the Tears"
Pre-school	Variety or sketch comedy
Ken Cuperus and Sandy Jobin-Bevans, Happy House of Frightenstein: "Heirloom Doom"; Victoria Gallant, The Fabulous Show with Fay and Fluffy: "I Love Being Different"; Carolyn Hay, Agent Binky: Pets of the Universe: "The Paw and Claw Spa"; Tyra Sweet, The Fabulous Show with Fay and Fluffy: "I Love My Family"; Richard Young, Dino Ranch: "Light Touch Tango"	Guled Abdi, Tim Blair, Vance Banzo and Franco Nguyen, TallBoyz: "Don't swear in front of the song"; Simu Liu, Luciano Casimiri, Leonard Chan, Julie Kim and Kristeen Von Hagen, Juno Awards of 2022; David F. Mewa and Milca Kuflu, 2022 Legacy Awards; Ngozi Paul, FreeUp! The Emancipation Day Special; George Reinblatt, Aisha Brown, Jeff Rothpan, Andrew Johnston and Rob Michaels, Roast Battle Canada: "Episode 201"
Animation	TV movie
Stephanie Kaliner and Lakna Edirisinghe, Pinecone & Pony: "The Pwettiest Pony / Try This Club On For Size"; J. Green and Sean Jara, Team Zenko Go: "Pet Project / Mission Improbable"; John May and Suzanne Bolch, 16 Hudson: "Spice Box"; Scott Montgomery, The Snoopy Show: "Snoopy Swap"; Sara Peters, Summer Memories: "Truth or Dare"	Rhonda Baraka, Miracle in Motor City; Barbara Kymlicka, Stolen by Their Father; Sebastian Pigott, Two Deaths of Henry Baker; Elizabeth Stewart, Be Mine, Valentine

== All-platform awards ==
One major category is currently presented without regard to the distinction between film, television or web media content.

Stunt Coordination
- John Stead, Anita Nittoly, Dejah Dixon-Green, Nova Zatzman and George Tchortov, Pretty Hard Cases: "Crystal Ball"
- Jean-François Lachapelle, Family Game (Arsenault et fils)
- Paul Nigro, Auto Aficionado: "Drift Racing"
- Dan Skene, Letterkenny: "King of Suckers"
- Wayne Wells, The Fight Machine

== Audience awards ==
Audience Choice	Shaw Rocket Fund Kids' Choice
Hudson & Rex; Canada's Drag Race; The Hardy Boys; Heartland; Murdoch Mysteries; Revenge of the Black Best Friend; SkyMed; Son of a Critch; Transplant; Vollies	The Fabulous Show with Fay and Fluffy; All-Round Champion; Big Blue; Dino Ranch; Holly Hobbie; Lil Glooscap and the Legends of Turtle Island; The Next Step; PAW Patrol; Thomas & Friends: All Engines Go; The Zone

== Digital media ==
Original Program or Series, Fiction	Original Program or Series, Non-Fiction
Revenge of the Black Best Friend; Avocado Toast; Mary and Flo On the Go!; Tokens; Topline	ET Canada Pride; Being Black in Canada: My Journey Here; Being Black in Canada at the Olympic Games; ET Canada Royal Rewind; Pride: The LGBTQ+ History Series
Lead Performance in a Web Program or Series	Supporting Performance in a Web Program or Series
Oluniké Adeliyi, Revenge of the Black Best Friend; Kayla Lorette, Doomlands; Heidi Lynch, Avocado Toast; Araya Mengesha, Revenge of the Black Best Friend; Lido Pimienta, Lido TV; Kirsten Rasmussen, Slo Pitch; Perrie Voss, Avocado Toast; Connie Wang, Tokens	Sedina Fiati, Tokens; Prince Amponsah, Avocado Toast; Nelu Handa, Avocado Toast; Ashton James, Revenge of the Black Best Friend; Emmanuel Kabongo, Chateau Laurier; Linda Kash, Sloppy Jones; Clare McConnell, Avocado Toast; Dwain Murphy, Revenge of the Black Best Friend
Direction in a Web Program or Series	Writing in a Web Program or Series
Winnifred Jong, Tokens: "The Goal"; Maya Annik Bedward and Alicia K. Harris, Lido TV: "Feminism"; Sam Coyle, Avocado Toast: "With a Side of... Decaf American't-Have-Kids-O"; Romeo Candido, Topline: "Sky Is Falling"; Thyrone Tommy, Revenge of the Black Best Friend: "The One Who Dies First"	Kent Staines and Emily Weedon, Chateau Laurier: "An Unfortunate Turn of Events"; Wendy Motion Brathwaite, Revenge of the Black Best Friend: "The One Who Dies First"; Romeo Candido and Marie Beath Badian, Topline: "Sky Is Falling"; Keavy Lynch, Revenge of the Black Best Friend: "Never the Hero"; Amanda Parris, Revenge of the Black Best Friend: "Cancelled"
Host in a Web Program or Series	Live Production for Social Media
Cheryl Hickey, Roz Weston, Sangita Patel, Carlos Bustamante, Keshia Chante and Morgan Hoffman, ET Canada Live; Kayla Grey, The Shift; Aiza Ntibarikure and Kamana Ntibarikure, Real Blackity Talk; Tracy Peart, CityLine: Face It with Tracy P; Mark Kenneth Woods, Pride: The LGBTQ+ History Series	ET Canada Live; The Extra Hour: Beijing 2022 Olympic Games; Intimate and Interactive: "Tate McRae"
Immersive Experience, Fiction	Immersive Experience, Non-Fiction
The Orchid and the Bee; Brainstream; Unceded Territories	Lou; The Choice; Partita for 8 Voices
Video game
I Was a Teenage Exocolonist; Jett: The Far Shore; Nobody Saves the World; Ooblets; Tunic

== Reception ==
Reception to the television special for the ceremony was mostly negative.

Barry Hertz of The Globe and Mail called it "humourless, dispiriting, condescending, and ultimately disrespectful to anyone who was nominated or won an award". He wrote that "the program focused not on the actual nominees and award-winners, but a random assortment of Canadian stars who found fame in the United States. While I don’t begrudge the Canadian Academy from shoehorning in some familiar names via its “special awards” to goose excitement, the structure of how they were included Sunday night was shameful. There is a distinct difference between using Humanitarian Award winner Ryan Reynolds and Radius Award winner Simu Liu as Trojan Horses to get audiences aware and interested in actual Canadian film and television, and simply giving those actors gobs of screen time instead of, say, Clement Virgo's film Brother (which won a remarkable 12 awards) or the CBC series The Porter (which dominated the television category with 12 statuettes of its own). Given that there are almost 150 awards categories spread out across the CSAs, you would think that the producers of Sunday's show would deign to include acceptance speeches from a few dozen of them. But instead, we got stingily edited packages of brief messages from the winners, inserted almost as a courtesy. I'm positive that the CSAs included more clips of Liu's Marvel movie Shang-Chi than Brother."

On Elamin Abdelmahmoud's radio show Commotion the following day, cultural critics Kathleen Newman-Bremang and Jesse Wente also criticized the television special as a failure, with Newman-Bremang criticizing the fact that the special had largely failed to clearly communicate who won what awards, and Wente stating that it felt like a preview trailer for the real awards ceremony.
