= Beautiful Scars =

Beautiful Scars may refer to:

- Beautiful Scars, a 2007 album by Kip Hanrahan,
- Beautiful Scars, a 2017 memoir by Tom Wilson,
- Beautiful Scars (film), a 2022 documentary film by Shane Belcourt, about Wilson and based in part on the book.
- Beautiful Scars, a 2025 song by Will Smith and Big Sean
