= Tremaine Thomas =

Canadian hairstylist

Tremaine Thomas is a Canadian hairstylist in film and television, who won the Canadian Screen Award for Best Hairstyling at the 11th Canadian Screen Awards in 2023 for her work on the film Brother.

Her other credits have included the television series Pretty Hard Cases and The Porter, and the film Akilla's Escape.
