= Ukulele U =

- Genre: Children's
- Created by: Melanie Doane
- Written by: Melanie Doane; Celeste Koon
- Directed by: David Connolly
- Starring: Melanie Doane; Glee Dango; Jazmin Headley; Stella Bartlett; Isabelle Aboagye
- Composer: Melanie Doane
- Country of origin: Canada
- Original language: English
- No. of seasons: 1
- No. of episodes: 52

Production
- Executive producers: Michael Hirsh; Bob Erzin; Melanie Doane
- Producer: Andrea Nevitt
- Running time: 7 minutes
- Production company: Mainframe Studios

Original release
- Network: CBC
- Release: January 8, 2022

Ukulele U is a Canadian children's television series, which premiered in 2022 on CBC Television and CBC Gem. Hosted by singer-songwriter and music educator Melanie Doane, the show is a singalong series in which Doane teaches various songs for children to sing as Doane plays ukulele.

Doane has described the show as inspired in part by the 1960s and 1970s CBC show Singalong Jubilee, on which her father, J. Chalmers Doane, had been an occasional performer.

In addition to hosting the show, Doane is also an executive producer, writer, and composer on the show, which also features the participation of Bob Ezrin as a producer and Doane's brother Creighton Doane as a songwriting collaborator.

Doane received a Canadian Screen Award nomination at the 11th Canadian Screen Awards in 2023 for Best Performance in a Children's or Youth Program or Series, and she, Ezrin and Creighton Doane were nominated for Best Original Song in Television for "Use Your Outside Voice".
