= Katerine Giguère =

Canadian cinematographer

Katerine Giguère is a Canadian cinematographer. She is most noted for her work on the documentary film Scrap, for which she was a Canadian Screen Award nominee for Best Cinematography in a Documentary at the 11th Canadian Screen Awards in 2023.

Her other credits have included the films Status Quo? The Unfinished Business of Feminism in Canada, Derby Crazy Love, My Mother's Letters (Les lettres de ma mère) and Greyland.

She is the daughter of documentary filmmaker Serge Giguère and producer Sylvie Van Brabant.
