= Dear Jackie =

- Directed by: Henri Pardo
- Written by: Henri Pardo
- Produced by: Katarina Soukup
- Cinematography: Vanessa Abadhir; Alex Margineanu
- Edited by: Dominique Sicotte
- Music by: Ramachandra Borcar
- Production company: CatBird Films
- Distributed by: Cinema Politica
- Release date: November 11, 2021 (RIDM)
- Running time: 90 minutes
- Country: Canada
- Languages: English; French

Dear Jackie is a Canadian documentary film, directed by Henri Pardo and released in 2021. Conceived as a love letter to Jackie Robinson, the film explores the way the city of Montreal used its embrace of Robinson, when he played for the Montreal Royals in the 1940s, to construct a mythical image of itself as a post-racial city that had moved beyond anti-black racism, even while Black residents of the city's Little Burgundy neighbourhood were still suffering profound effects of racism in reality.

The film premiered at the 2021 Montreal International Documentary Festival, where Pardo won the Magnus Isacsson Award for socially conscious works by emerging Canadian filmmakers. It had a commercial release in June 2022.

The film was a nominee for the Donald Brittain Award for best social or political television documentary at the 11th Canadian Screen Awards in 2023.
