= Revenge of the Black Best Friend =

Revenge of the Black Best Friend is a Canadian comedy web series, which premiered in 2022 on CBC Gem. Created by Amanda Parris, the series stars Oluniké Adeliyi as Dr. Toni Shakur, a self-help guru who specializes in helping Black actors who long for more than just the stereotypical supporting roles.

The cast also includes Ashton James, Andrea Lewis, Cara Ricketts, Dwain Murphy, Izad Etemadi, Jameson Kraemer, Julian De Zotti, Dan Duran, Natasha Mumba, Samantha Brown, Rachael Crawford, Khadijah Roberts-Abdullah, Araya Mengesha, Tymika Tafari, Krista Morin, Kit Weyman and Perrie Voss.

== Awards ==
Award	Date of ceremony	Category	Recipient(s)	Result	Ref(s)
Canadian Screen Awards	2023	Best Web Program or Series, Fiction	Amanda Parris, Jonas Diamond, Julian De Zotti, Wendy Motion Brathwaite, Mercedes Grundy	Won	
Canadian Screen Awards	2023	Best Lead Performance, Web Program or Series	Oluniké Adeliyi	Won	
Canadian Screen Awards	2023	Best Lead Performance, Web Program or Series	Araya Mengesha	Nominated	
Canadian Screen Awards	2023	Best Supporting Performance, Web Program or Series	Ashton James	Nominated	
Canadian Screen Awards	2023	Best Supporting Performance, Web Program or Series	Dwain Murphy	Nominated	
Canadian Screen Awards	2023	Best Direction, Web Program or Series	Thyrone Tommy — "The One Who Dies First"	Nominated	
Canadian Screen Awards	2023	Best Writing, Web Program or Series	Wendy Motion Brathwaite — "The One Who Dies First"	Nominated	
Canadian Screen Awards	2023	Best Writing, Web Program or Series	Keavy Lynch — "Never the Hero"	Nominated	
Canadian Screen Awards	2023	Best Writing, Web Program or Series	Amanda Parris — "Cancelled"	Nominated	
