= Huronia Regional Centre =

Geography
- Location: Orillia, Ontario, Canada
- Coordinates: 44.5798°N 79.4283°W

Organization
- Type: Specialist

Services
- Speciality: Hospital school for developmentally disabled children

History
- Former names: Ontario Hospital School, Orillia; Orillia Asylum for Idiots

Links
- Lists: Hospitals in Canada

The Huronia Regional Centre (previously the Ontario Hospital School, Orillia, and initially the Orillia Asylum for Idiots) was an institution for developmentally disabled people operated by the government of Ontario, Canada between 1876 and 2009. After the closing of the school, and prompted by a class-action lawsuit, the government apologized for decades of neglectful abuse of the facility's residents and paid a settlement to surviving victims.

The Ontario Hospital School, Orillia served Central Ontario, including the Counties of Halton, Peel, York, Ontario, Simcoe and the Districts of Muskoka and Parry Sound.

== Facilities ==
In 1859, the Ontario government established a branch of the Toronto-based Provincial Lunatic Asylum in Orillia, modifying a hotel to suit this purpose. Within a few years, the facility was closed down due to disrepair, but due to increasing demand for residential mental health services, it was reconditioned and reopened in 1876, this time as a newly independent "Hospital for Idiots and Imbeciles"—specifically children.

In 1885, the hotel building was becoming overcrowded, and it was replaced by a new property on the shore of Lake Simcoe. The new main building and two three-storey "cottages" were augmented by several additional buildings built around 1915 and 1932. By the time of its closure on March 31, 2009, it was configured with individual apartments, a canteen, a chapel and a therapeutic swimming pool. With the purchase of adjacent lands in 1911, the facility stood on a 1.8 km^{2} plot and included a farm.

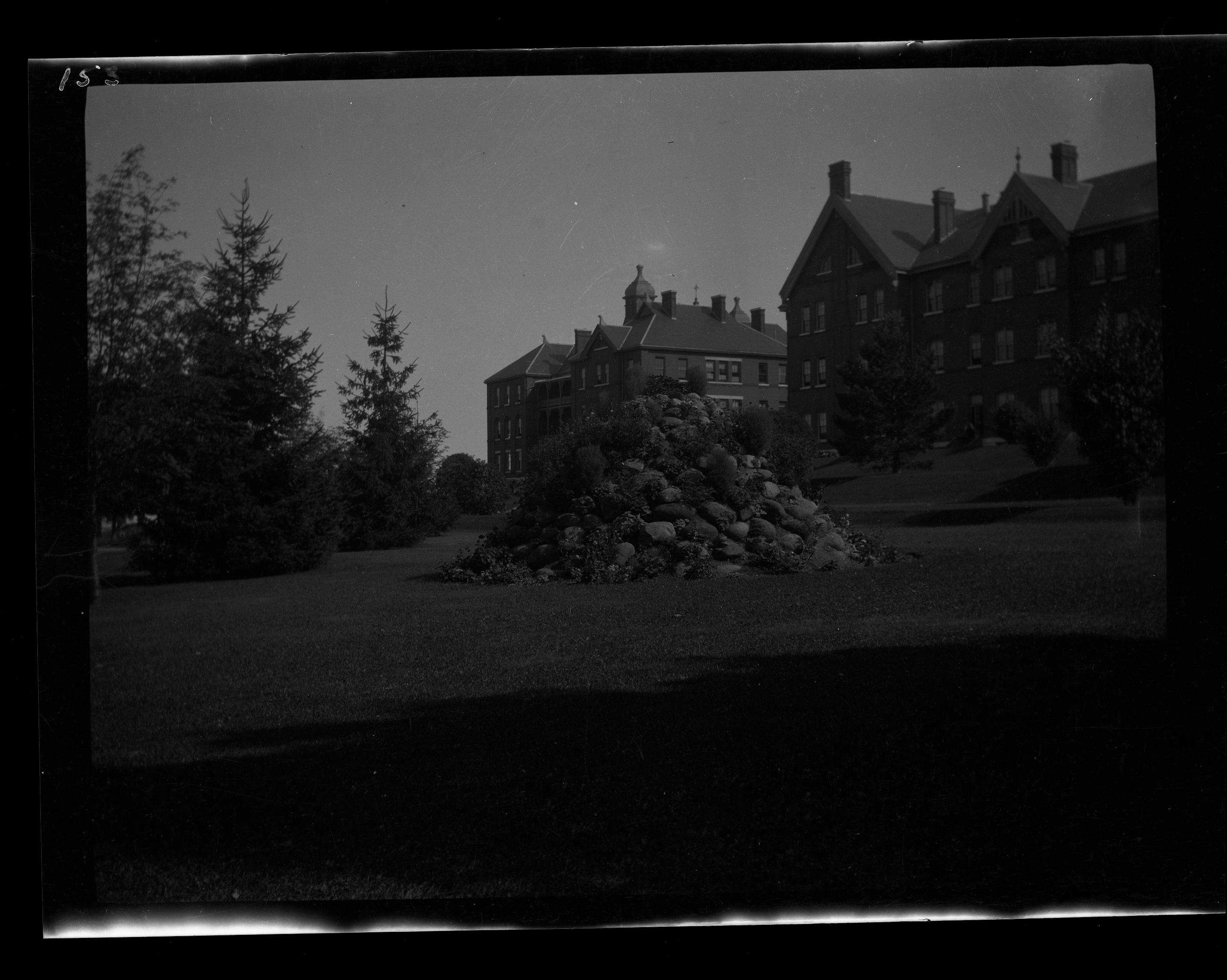
The main building in 1909

When Toronto Star columnist Pierre Berton visited the Ontario Hospital School in 1960, he reported dilapidation and gross overcrowding—2,808 residents occupying spaces that could hardly contain a thousand fewer, with sleeping quarters installed in repurposed classrooms, playrooms and therapy rooms. Washroom facilities were also insufficient—on one floor, 144 patients shared 8 toilets, 3 showers and 1 bathtub—and Berton observed that "[p]risoners in reformatories have better facilities." 900 of the higher-functioning patients were housed in the oldest and least fire-resistant buildings, because they were judged most able to flee in case of evacuation. Despite these glaring flaws, Berton also noted that "[i]n many respects it [was] an up-to-date institution with a dedicated staff fighting an uphill battle against despairing conditions."

Later in its existence, the Huronia Regional Centre was home to considerably fewer residents. In April 1971, the daily average resident population was 1,857; in 1975, the population of 1,812 was composed of 1,216 males and 596 females; in 1996, 583 people lived there; and by 2004, fewer than 350 remained. The residents also tended to be considerably older—49 years of age, on average, in 2004.

The institutional cemetery is located in a field across from the Centre. There are about 1,440 unmarked graves and 571 numbered graves located there; the last burial took place in 1971, and several numbered markers were removed during paving in the 1970s. The use of sequential numbers rather than names was purportedly to protect the privacy of those interred there. An organization called Remember Every Name was working with the Ministry of Community and Social Services to mark or otherwise memorialize the graves.

The Ministry of Economic Development, Employment and Infrastructure solicited suggestions for the future use of the site. In 2014, the Huronia Cultural Campus Foundation proposed that the main building be redeveloped into an arts centre, while some former residents insisted that it be demolished. In the meantime, the Ontario Provincial Police and courts used some buildings on the site for other purposes.

In 2025 the Ontario Ministry of Infrastructure Kinga Sumra approved changes to the property and in 2026 the demolition of most of the buildings began. It is vaguely stated their press release that the property will be for The Ontario Provincial Police training academy and ‘other’ government uses.

== Admissions ==
Despite the overcrowding, in 1960, there was a waiting list of 4,000 children waiting to be housed in the institution—and while the hospital admitted 3 new patients per day, patients were leaving (by discharge or death) at less than half that rate. The new branch of the Ontario Hospital School at Cedar Springs in Chatham-Kent (later known as the Southwestern Regional Centre) was unable to keep up with that demand, much less house the entire population for long enough to repair and renovate the Orillia complex.

Prior to the 1970s, admissions to Ontario residential mental health facilities were frequently dictated by members of the Ontario Legislature and their staffs, acting upon constituents' requests. By 1971, this problem had been overcome with the introduction of a priority rating scale intended to ensure that the admissions process was based upon need rather than political pressure.

== Programs and services ==
Walter Williston's 1971 report calculated that the ward staff of 653 was 257 too few, based on American Association for Mental Deficiency standards. Berton also remarked that the facility was understaffed, and that it was admitting numerous patients younger than 6 years of age—for whom it was not designed or originally intended.

Beginning in 1989, Judy Richardson, an occupational therapist at the Centre, conducted an art class for some of its residents. She collected whatever artwork the students did not keep for themselves—making notes about authorship and subject matter on the reverse—and kept the works at her Orillia home. After her death, her husband bequeathed 200 of these works to the Creative Spirit Art Centre on the condition that they never be sold. They were displayed in 2013 at the Creative Spirit Art Centre in Toronto in an exhibit called "Breaking out of Huronia".

== Allegations of abuse by staff ==
In 2010, several former residents of the Centre, together with litigation guardians Marilyn and Jim Dolmage, sued the government of Ontario, alleging that the hospital staff perpetrated systemic physical, sexual and emotional abuse against the children between 1945 and 2009. Marilyn Dolmage's affidavit "described residents being kept in caged cots, having all their teeth removed for safety reasons and being held upside down with their heads under running water as punishment for not eating." Others alleged "routine beatings, degrading treatment and the frequent use of psychotropic drugs to manage behaviour."

The Ontario government denied that the abuse was systemic or neglectful, but acknowledged isolated instances of abuse. The Centre had previously been a subject of Walter Williston's "scathing government-commissioned report" in 1971, a government inquest in 1976, and numerous newspaper investigations.

The suit (Dolmage v. The Queen) was certified by the Ontario Superior Court as a class action representing 5,000 former residents of the facility. (Note: It was the first class action to be certified against an Ontario government psychiatric facility.) The plaintiffs, represented by Kirk Baert of Koskie Minsky LLP, sought $1 billion in general damages and an additional $1 billion in punitive damages, plus interest and legal costs. The trial court was to determine whether systemic negligence and breaches of fiduciary, statutory and common law duty took place, and whether the Department of Health allowed conditions to deteriorate below the standard of care in place at the time. Additionally, the court was to decide whether the aggregate damages provisions of the Class Proceedings Act were applicable.

After the parties agreed to a daylong delay to the beginning of the trial, they announced a settlement for $35 million, a formal apology and other concessions. (Note: Settlement terms—subject to judicial approval by December 16, 2013—included a $35 million fund from which to draw compensation (of up to $42000 per victim) and legal fees, a formal apology by the government addressed to all past residents of the facility, a commemorative plaque, maintenance of the site's cemetery and establishment of a burial registry (using records preserved by the government), and the release of 65000 related government records, police reports, eyewitness accounts and pieces of correspondence. These documents will be made available for scholarly research, which the editors of the Toronto Star considered "a significant step toward transparency".) The settlement was approved by the Ontario Superior Court on December 3, 2013.

On December 9, 2013, Premier of Ontario Kathleen Wynne publicly apologized on the floor of the legislature, saying "I am sorry for what you and your loved ones experienced, and for the pain that you carry to this day", noting that "some residents suffered neglect and abuse within the very system that was meant to provide them care". Marilyn Dolmage found the apology to be "very sincere", as did some former residents in attendance. Minority party leaders Tim Hudak and Andrea Horwath also apologized; some former Huronia residents considered this important because abuse took place while Liberal, PC and NDP governments were in power.

In 2022, filmmaker Barri Cohen, who had two older brothers die at the institution in childhood, released the documentary film Unloved: Huronia's Forgotten Children.

== See also ==
- Southwestern Regional Centre
- Rideau Regional Centre
