= Marsha Greene =

Canadian television writer and producer

Marsha Greene is a Canadian television writer and producer, most noted as a writer and producer of the 2022 drama series The Porter.

She won the Canadian Screen Award for Best Writing in a Drama Series at the 11th Canadian Screen Awards in 2023, and the 2023 WGC Screenwriting Award for best writing in a drama, for her work on the series.

She was previously a writer for Mary Kills People, for which she received Canadian Screen Award nominations for Best Writing in a Drama at the 6th Canadian Screen Awards in 2018, the 7th Canadian Screen Awards in 2019, and the 8th Canadian Screen Awards in 2020.

At the 13th Canadian Screen Awards in 2025, she was named the recipient of the Changemaker Award.
