= Stuart Henderson =

Filmmaker, historian and crtitic

Stuart Robert Henderson is a Canadian filmmaker, historian, and culture critic. He is the president of 90th Parallel Productions, a film production company. He is the author of the Clio award-winning book Making the Scene, Yorkville and Hip Toronto in the 1960s (University of Toronto Press, 2011). "Making the Scene" focuses on the history of 1960s Yorkville as a mecca for Toronto's and Canada's counterculture.

Henderson is the producer and showrunner for We're All Gonna Die (Even Jay Baruchel), a Crave Original documentary series about the end of the world. He won the Canadian Screen Award for Best Writing in 2025. Among the documentary films he has produced are The Skin We're In, Invisible Essence: The Little Prince, and My First 150 Days. Working with Jesse Wente and Justine Pimlott, he produced Inconvenient Indian, a feature documentary from director Michelle Latimer. The film, based on the best-selling book by Thomas King, premiered at the Toronto International Film Festival in 2020.

Henderson has held post-doctoral fellowships at McMaster University (2008–2009) and York University (2009–2011) where he conducted research on Toronto's Rochdale College and what he has termed "hip separatism" in the 1970s. He has taught Canadian cultural history courses at the University of Toronto and Queen's University. His doctoral dissertation was honoured by the Canadian Historical Association with the John Bullen Prize for best PhD thesis (2008).

Henderson's academic work has appeared in the Journal of Canadian Studies, the Canadian Historical Review, LeftHistory, the Journal of Canadian Historical Association and the Journal for the Study of Radicalism.

He has worked as the editor of the Americana section at Exclaim! and as a features editor at PopMatters Media Inc, where he was also a frequent contributor.

Henderson is former chair of the board for Point of View magazine. He has served on the jury for the Polaris Music Prize and has worked as the national pop culture columnist for CBC Radio One. On May 15, 2011, Henderson was elected to the executive board of the Popular Culture Association of Canada. He lives in Toronto.
