= Underground Railroad: The Secret History =

Underground Railroad: The Secret History is an American-Canadian documentary television series, which premiered in 2022 on Discovery Channel Canada, Science Channel, and Discovery+. Narrated by actor Clark Johnson, the four-part series profiles the history of the Underground Railroad, through which escaped African-American slaves from the Southern United States escaped to freedom in the northeastern U.S. or Canada, focusing in part on the newest archaeological and scientific discoveries that have expanded the depth of historical knowledge about the period.

The series was produced by Attraction Media.

The series won the Canadian Screen Award for Best History Documentary Program or Series at the 11th Canadian Screen Awards in 2023.
