= Juanita Taylor =

Canadian television journalist

Juanita Taylor is a Canadian television journalist, most noted as the winner of the Canadian Screen Award for Best National Reporter at the 11th Canadian Screen Awards in 2023.

An Inuk from Arviat, Nunavut, she graduated from journalism school in 2007, and was briefly a reporter for APTN before joining the Canadian Broadcasting Corporation in 2009 as a reporter for CBC North. She left the CBC in 2017 to return to APTN as anchor of APTN National News, returning to the CBC the following year as anchor of CBC North's Northbeat. She was the anchor of Northbeat until 2021, when she moved into a new role as a national reporter for the Canadian Arctic region.
