= Unloved: Huronia's Forgotten Children =

2022 Canadian documentary film

- Directed by: Barri Cohen
- Written by: Barri Cohen
- Produced by: Craig Baines
- Cinematography: James Kinistino
- Edited by: Sarah Peddie
- Music by: Michelle Osis
- Production company: White Pine Pictures
- Release date: May 4, 2022 (Hot Docs)
- Running time: 90 minutes
- Country: Canada
- Language: English

Unloved: Huronia's Forgotten Children is a Canadian documentary film, directed by Barri Cohen and released in 2022. The film documents the history of child abuse at Ontario's Huronia Regional Centre facility for developmentally disabled children, based in part on the story of her own two older brothers, Alfred and Louis, who died at the institution.

The film premiered at the 2022 Hot Docs Canadian International Documentary Festival, where it was named the third-place winner of the Rogers Audience Award. It was broadcast on the Documentary Channel and CBC Gem later in the year.

== Awards ==
The film was a nominee for the DGC Allan King Award for Best Documentary Film at the 2022 Directors Guild of Canada awards.

It received four Canadian Screen Award nominations at the 11th Canadian Screen Awards in 2023, for Best Editorial Research (Cohen, Jessica Joy Wise), Best Visual Research (Cohen, Wise), Best Direction in a Documentary Program (Cohen) and Best Original Music in a Television Documentary (Michelle Osis).
