= Guillaume Coutu Dumont =

- Origin: Montreal, Quebec, Canada
- Genres: Electronic
- Occupation: Musician
- Instrument: Percussion
- Website: guillaumeandthecoutudumonts.bandcamp.com

Guillaume Coutu Dumont is an electronic musician from Montreal, Quebec, Canada, who is based in Berlin, Germany. He is noted for his various collaborations with musicians such as Julien Roy, David Fafard and Vincent Lemieux as part of his association with MUTEK and is one of the premiered performers at the MUTEK Festival in Montreal.

== Background ==
Coutu Dumont comes from an artistic family with an actress mother, Angèle Coutu, and a twin brother, Gabriel Coutu Dumont, who is a visual artist. He began learning Latin and classical percussion when he was seventeen, although he was told he was too old to begin that kind of training. He originally went to college to study anthropology, but began to play in a funk band and discovered electroacoustic music. His college happened to be the only one in Quebec that offered electroacoustic composition courses. He applied to change majors to study music and was accepted. However, instead of finishing school, he began working with Julien Roy on the Egg project. This same Julien Roy introduced Coutu Dumont to electronic music by inviting him to a techno party. The experience, he says, made him get over his prejudice against machine generated music.

== Career ==
Dumont went to Africa in 2001, as percussionist with a jazz band called [iks], recording two albums and toured in Senegal. The goal of the tour was to play the St. Louis Jazz Festival. However, the group spent three months in a small village called Linguère in the desert, living with a family of percussionists. The idea was to work with these native musicians to bring them to Canada and record. However, there were cultural and legal problems. While the experience has affected his music and outlook, according to the artist, he also says the experience has been overplayed in the press, including rumors that he travelled all over Africa on camel living off the land.

Coutu Dumont has been a part of the MUTEK organization since 2003, when he mixed one of his first CDs along with Julien Roy under the name of Egg, releasing music under MUTEK Rec with the album Don't Postpone Joy, in 2003. He has since been one of featured performers at the MUTEK Festival in Montreal along with Akufen, Deadbeat, Stephen Beaupré, and Vincent Lemieux .

Most of Coutu Dumont's collaborative work has been in conjunction with MUTEK. With Argentine Ernesto Ferreyra, he worked under the name of Chic Miniature, releasing recording under the Raummusik and Musique Risquée labels. Other collaborative projects include with Luci with David Fafard (Mutek_rec, Morris Audio), Flabbergast with Vincent Lemieux (Mutek_rec), as well as with the artist collective Racam. More recently Coutu Dumont has been part of Per Eckbo Orchestra, a project with Federico Molinari that has resulted in a release on Oslo with tracks appearing on Poker Flat and Cocoon mix CDs.

His first independent work was under the name of Guillaume & The Coutu Dumonts, when he released a number of compositions, remixes and other projects with Circus Company, Musique Risquée, Crosstown Rebels and Get Physical. Their first album was released in 2006 and called Sélection Surnaturelle, an EP more noted for its cover art than its contents. In 2007, they were more successful with music released by Floppy Funk, Oslo, Hartchef Discos, and the Circus Company labels.

Although Coutu Dumont got his start in Montreal, he moved to Europe in the late 2000s, primarily due to economics. He states that there is more opportunity for his type of music there than in Canada. Even with four or five projects when in Canada, he was performing four or five times a year, with almost nothing outside of MUTEK. He first worked in Paris for four months before heading to Berlin. However the move forced Coutu Dumont to go solo as his collaborative partners did not want to make the move as well. In Europe, he released his first purely solo album in Europe Face à L’est, on Musique Risquée in 2007.

For concert performances, Coutu Dumont plays his music live rather than DJing recordings of his work. He tours with a group of five musicians called The Side Effects as his preferred way to bring his music live onto the stage. This includes electric guitarist Alexis Messier, pianist Nicolas Boucher, vocalist Marc Barrite and saxophonist Sébastien Arcand Tourigny. The performances of Guillaume Coutu Dumont & The Side Effects contain elements of Funk, house, techno, gospel, swing and Afro-beat with DJ generated electronic percussions. This group has played a number of festival venues including MUTEK in Montreal, MUTEK México and the Festival Internacional Cervantino.

== Discography ==
=== Albums ===
- 2007: Face À L'Est, Musique Risquée
- 2010: Breaking the Fourth Wall, (Guillaume & the Coutu Dumonts)
- 2010: Breaking the Fourth Wall, Extended Mixes (Guillaume & the Coutu Dumonts)
- 2012: Twice Around the Sun, Circus Company

=== EPs ===
- 2006: Sélection Surnaturelle, Musique Risquée
- 2009: The Pussy Shepherd, Musique Risquée
- 2007: Petits Djinns, (Guillaume & the Coutu Dumonts)
- 2003: Don’t Postpone the Joy, Musique Risquée

=== Singles ===
- 2008: "Les Gans", Risquée (Guillaume & the Coutu Dumonts)
- 2008: "They Only Come Out At Night", Musique Risquée (Guillaume & the Coutu Dumonts)
- 2008: "I Was On My Way To Hell", (Guillaume & the Coutu Dumonts)
- 2010: "Can’t Have Everything", (Guillaume & the Coutu Dumonts & dOP)

=== Other ===
- Snuggle & Slap, (with various artists)
- 2012: Kozber & Rico Casazza "Gillett Square" (Remix, Soundbar Records)
