= The Goats of Monesiglio =

2022 Canadian short documentary film

- Directed by: Emily Graves
- Produced by: Anna Cooley; Raj Dhillon; Emily Graves
- Cinematography: Anna Cooley
- Edited by: Emily Graves; Kaisa Pitsi
- Music by: Giuseppe Alfano
- Release date: May 26, 2022 (Yorkton)
- Running time: 25 minutes
- Country: Canada
- Language: Italian

The Goats of Monesiglio is a Canadian short documentary film, directed by Emily Graves and released in 2022. The film is a portrait of two families, one Italian and one Punjabi, who work alongside each other as goatherds in the small Italian town of Monesiglio.

The film premiered May 26, 2022 at the Yorkton Film Festival.

The film was a Canadian Screen Award nominee for Best Short Documentary at the 11th Canadian Screen Awards in 2023.
