= The Kids in the Hall: Comedy Punks =

- Promotional poster
- Directed by: Reginald Harkema
- Produced by: Kim Creelman; Nick McKinney
- Starring: Dave Foley; Bruce McCulloch; Kevin McDonald; Mark McKinney; Scott Thompson
- Cinematography: Christina Ienna; Michelle McCabe
- Edited by: Peter Denes
- Production company: Blue Ant Media
- Distributed by: Amazon Prime Video
- Release date: March 15, 2022 (SXSW)
- Running time: 95 minutes
- Country: Canada
- Language: English

The Kids in the Hall: Comedy Punks is a 2022 Canadian documentary film, directed by Reginald Harkema. Released to coincide with Amazon Prime's relaunch of the influential Canadian sketch comedy series and based partially on Paul Myers's 2018 book The Kids in the Hall: One Dumb Guy, the film documents the history of the troupe through both archival footage and contemporary interviews with the members, largely filmed at The Rivoli, the Toronto club where the troupe got their start on stage.

The film also includes segments with other actors and comedians commenting on the troupe's influence, including Fred Armisen, Jay Baruchel, Lewis Black, Janeane Garofalo, Eddie Izzard, Mae Martin, Mike Myers, Eric McCormack and Lorne Michaels.

The film premiered on March 15, 2022 at the SXSW festival, and had its Canadian premiere at the 2022 Hot Docs Canadian International Documentary Festival, in advance of its launch on Amazon on May 20 as a companion to the new season of the series.

== Reception ==
On the review aggregator website Rotten Tomatoes, 100% of 21 critics' reviews are positive, with an average rating of 8.3/10. The website's consensus reads: "The Kids in the Hall: Comedy Punks balances anarchic humor with emotional depth to offer a heartfelt tribute for devoted fans and an engaging origin story for newcomers." Metacritic, which uses a weighted average, assigned the film a score of 78 out of 100, based on 4 critics, indicating "generally favorable" reviews.

The film won the Canadian Screen Award for Best Biography or Arts Documentary Program or Series at the 11th Canadian Screen Awards in 2023.
