= Buffy Sainte-Marie: Starwalker =

2022 Canadian television special

Buffy Sainte-Marie: Starwalker is a Canadian television special, which was broadcast by CBC Television and APTN on September 30, 2022. The program was a tribute concert featuring musicians and dancers performing the songs of singer-songwriter Buffy Sainte-Marie. She was widely believed to be Indigenous Canadian at the time, and the tribute emphasized her claimed heritage. The concert was staged at the National Arts Centre to mark the National Day of Truth and Reconciliation.

The special received two Canadian Screen Award nominations at the 11th Canadian Screen Awards in April 2023, for Best Performing Arts Program and Best Sound in a Lifestyle, Reality or Entertainment Program or Series.

In October 2023, an investigation by CBC News disclosed how Sainte-Marie's claims of Indigenous identity were false, and she was born in the United States to parents of European descent.

== Performers ==
- The Halluci Nation, "Bodyslam/You Got to Run (Spirit of the Wind)"
- Crystal Shawanda, "Bury My Heart at Wounded Knee"
- Jera Wolfe, "Moonshot" (dance piece)
- William Prince and Marie-Mai, "Up Where We Belong"
- Leela Gilday, "Darling Don't Cry"
- Jeremy Dutcher, "Universal Soldier"
- Willam Prince and The Tragically Hip, "Now That the Buffalo's Gone"
- Alanis Obomsawin, spoken word piece set to Sainte-Marie's score for the film Where the Spirit Lives
- Marie-Mai, "Until It's Time for You to Go"
- Logan Staats, "Cod'ine"
- Buffy Sainte-Marie, "You Got to Run (Spirit of the Wind)"
