= À la vie à l'amor =

2022 Canadian short drama film

- Film poster
- Directed by: Émilie Mannering
- Written by: Lex Garcia; Émilie Mannering
- Produced by: Léonie Hurtubise
- Starring: Lex Garcia; Eloïsa Cervantes
- Cinematography: Simran Dewan
- Edited by: Myriam Magassouba
- Music by: Samuel Gougoux
- Production company: Colonelle Films
- Distributed by: H264 Distribution
- Release date: September 9, 2022 (TIFF)
- Running time: 15 minutes
- Country: Canada
- Languages: English; French; Spanish

À la vie à l'amor is a 2022 Canadian short drama film, directed by Émilie Mannering. Featuring dialogue in English, French and Spanish, the film stars Lex Garcia as Cesar, a man who is emotionally numb from a difficult breakup; for his 30th birthday, he asks his friends and family to let him record their testimonies about the meaning and value of love.

The film premiered at the 2022 Toronto International Film Festival.

The film was a finalist for the 2023 Prix collégial du cinéma québécois for short films, and a Canadian Screen Award nominee for Best Live Action Short Drama at the 11th Canadian Screen Awards.
