= A Cut Above (TV series) =

Canadian reality competition television series

A Cut Above is a Canadian reality competition television series, which premiered in 2022 on Discovery Channel Canada. Hosted by Adam Beach, the series is a chainsaw carving competition in which accomplished wood carvers participate in challenges to determine the carver who is "a cut above" the rest.

Competitors in the first season were Andrew Mallon, Aya Blane, Bongo Love, Brigitte Lochhead, Chris Woods, Jesse Toso, Joel Palmer, John Hayes, Junior Henderson, Ryan Villers, Sam Bowsher and Sylvia Itzen, with professional carver Ryan Cook and sculptor Katharine Dowson as judges.

The series premiered August 8, 2022, on Discovery.

It received three Canadian Screen Award nominations at the 11th Canadian Screen Awards in 2023, for Best Reality/Competition Series, Best Writing in a Lifestyle or Reality/Competition Series (Elvira Kurt) and Best Original Music in a Factual, Lifestyle, Reality or Entertainment Series (Rachael Johnstone, Annelise Noronha, Jason Turriff and Earl Torno).
