= Lil Glooscap and the Legends of Turtle Island =

Canadian children's animated television series

Lil Glooscap and the Legends of Turtle Island is a Canadian children's animated television series, which premiered in 2022 on APTN. Created by Wolastoqey artist Tara Audibert, the series centres on the adventures of young Glooscap, a mythical figure in Wabanaki indigenous culture.

The show's voice cast includes Natalie Sappier as Glooscap, and Imelda Perley as his grandmother Meme Muwin, as well as Audibert, Kateri Mowbray and Rebecca Elmire Tremblay in supporting roles.

APTN airs the show in English, French and Wolastoqey versions. The series premiered May 7, 2022 on APTN.

The series was a nominee for the Shaw Rocket Fund Kids' Choice Award at the 11th Canadian Screen Awards in 2023.
