= Lost Car Rescue =

Canadian documentary television series

Lost Car Rescue is a Canadian documentary television series, which premiered in 2022 on History. The series is led by Matt Sager, a resident of Mill Bay, British Columbia. Sager's team includes pilot Jessica James, mechanic Steve Sager, auto body repairman Dave Mischuk, and crane operator Lee Brandt.

The team searches for rare, old cars that have been abandoned in the wilderness, and attempts to recover and rehabilitate them.

The series is produced by Boat Rocker Media and Proper Television.

The series received a Canadian Screen Award nomination for Best Factual Program or Series at the 11th Canadian Screen Awards in 2023.
