= Greyland =

2022 Canadian documentary film

- Directed by: Alexandra Sicotte-Lévesque
- Written by: Alexandra Sicotte-Lévesque
- Produced by: Alexandra Sicotte-Lévesque; Sylvie Van Brabant
- Starring: Rocco Sait; Amber Beall
- Cinematography: Katerine Giguère
- Edited by: Annie Leclair
- Music by: Antoine Berthiaume
- Production company: Rapide-Blanc
- Release date: April 23, 2022 (RVQC)
- Running time: 77 minutes
- Country: Canada
- Language: English

Greyland is a Canadian documentary film, directed by Alexandra Sicotte-Lévesque and released in 2022. The film focuses on Rocco Sait and Amber Beall, two young activists in Youngstown, Ohio, who are advocating for change in the struggling industrial city but facing bureaucratic and institutional resistance to their efforts.

The film premiered on April 23, 2022, at the Rendez-vous Québec Cinéma. It subsequently screened at various film festivals and had a commercial screening in Youngstown in August 2022.

Antoine Berthiaume received a Canadian Screen Award nomination for Best Original Music in a Documentary at the 12th Canadian Screen Awards in 2024.
