= Brother (2022 film) =

- Theatrical release poster
- Directed by: Clement Virgo
- Written by: Clement Virgo
- Based on: Brother by David Chariandy
- Produced by: Damon D'Oliveira; Sonya Di Rienzo; Aeschylus Poulos; Clement Virgo
- Starring: Aaron Pierre; Lamar Johnson; Marsha Stephanie Blake; Kiana Madeira; Lovell Adams-Gray; Maurice Dean Wint; Dwain Murphy
- Cinematography: Guy Godfree
- Edited by: Kye Meechan
- Production companies: Hawkeye Pictures; Conquering Lion Pictures
- Distributed by: Elevation Pictures
- Release date: September 9, 2022 (TIFF)
- Running time: 120 minutes
- Country: Canada
- Language: English

Brother is a 2022 Canadian drama film, written, produced and directed by Clement Virgo. An adaptation of David Chariandy's award-winning novel of the same name, the film centres on the relationship between Francis and Michael, two Black Canadian brothers growing up in the Scarborough district of Toronto, Ontario in the early 1990s.

The film stars Aaron Pierre as Francis and Lamar Johnson as Michael, with supporting cast members including Kiana Madeira, Marsha Stephanie Blake, Lovell Adams-Gray, Maurice Dean Wint, and Dwain Murphy.

The novel's optioning for film was announced in 2018, and the film went into production in fall 2021. It is the second Canadian film in as many years, following Scarborough in 2021, to be set in the Galloway Road neighbourhood of Scarborough, and Virgo's first theatrical feature film since 2007's Poor Boy's Game.

The film premiered at the 2022 Toronto International Film Festival on September 9, 2022. It was also screened as the closing film of the 2022 Calgary International Film Festival and as the opening film of the 2022 FIN Atlantic Film Festival.

== Synopsis ==
Francis and Michael are brothers living in Canada and sons of Caribbean immigrants from Jamaica. In the summer of 1991, the young men immerse themselves in the hip-hop scene of Scarborough.

When his childhood sweetheart Aisha returns to their neighbourhood for the first time in 10 years, Michael is forced to reconsider a family tragedy. Growing up as young black boys in a neighbourhood prone to gang violence and police brutality, his older brother Francis had to be Michael's best friend, protector and even parent at the same time, because their single mother worked shifts as a nurse. As they grew older, Francis and Michael parted ways, but the unconditional love between the brothers and their mother continued.

The film uses a non-linear structure, switching back and forth between the boys' childhood, their teen years leading up to and the lingering aftermath of Francis' death, all building toward the ultimate revelation in the film's climax of how Francis died.

Although the film doesn't explicitly address LGBTQ themes in dialogue, a key scene toward the end of the film depicts Francis being physically intimate with his friend Jelly, suggesting that some of his emotional issues around their father's absence from their lives stem from being queer.

== Cast ==
- Aaron Pierre as Francis
- Lamar Johnson as Michael
- Marsha Stephanie Blake as Ruth
- Kiana Madeira as Aisha
- Lovell Adams-Gray as Jelly
- Maurice Dean Wint as Samuel
- Dwain Murphy as Dru

== Reception ==
=== Critical response ===
On the review aggregator website Rotten Tomatoes, 87% of 45 critics' reviews are positive, with an average rating of 7.5/10. The website's consensus reads: "Deeply felt and emotionally resonant, Brother overcomes its imposing length and a certain narrative familiarity with riveting performances and stunning cinematography."

In The Globe and Mail, Barry Hertz wrote, "The spirit of what Scarborough represents – for Chariandy, and for Clement – is undoubtedly present in every lovingly composed frame of Brother." Peter Howell, film critic for The Toronto Star gave the film 3.5 out of 5 stars and added, "A world is revealed, brilliantly." Brian Tallerico, editor for the film review website RogerEbert.com published, "There’s such gracefulness to the filmmaking here, cutting back and forth across time, building like a thriller."

For Deadline Hollywood, Valerie Complex wrote that "Brother is a film that reaffirms why I love movies. The narrative asks so many vital questions about Black life and masculinity, but most of all: If Black boys are raising themselves to adulthood, where do they turn for support? This is the ultimate dilemma Francis and Michael find themselves in. Brother isn’t just another “Black” film. This is a vital piece of cinema that hasn't received the buzz it deserves. I don't want to see this fly under the radar, and I hope others will be open-minded enough to witness the genius of Clement Virgo and these young actors."

=== Accolades ===
The film was named to TIFF's annual year-end Canada's Top Ten list for 2022. It won 12 Canadian Screen Awards at the 11th Canadian Screen Awards in 2023, the most awards won by any film in the Canadian Screen Awards era to that time (although its record was surpassed within one year by the 14 awards won by BlackBerry), and the best performance by any film since Night Zoo (Un zoo la nuit) won 13 Genie Awards at the 9th Genie Awards in 1988.

Award	Date of ceremony	Category	Recipient(s)	Result	Ref.
Black Reel Awards	January 16, 2024	Outstanding International Film	Clement Virgo	Nominated	
Canadian Screen Awards	April 16, 2023	Best Motion Picture	Damon D'Oliveira, Sonya Di Rienzo, Aeschylus Poulos, Clement Virgo	Won	
Canadian Screen Awards	April 16, 2023	Best Director	Clement Virgo	Won	
Canadian Screen Awards	April 16, 2023	Best Lead Performance in a Film	Lamar Johnson	Won	
Canadian Screen Awards	April 16, 2023	Best Supporting Performance in a Film	Marsha Stephanie Blake	Nominated	
Canadian Screen Awards	April 16, 2023	Best Supporting Performance in a Film	Aaron Pierre	Won	
Canadian Screen Awards	April 16, 2023	Best Adapted Screenplay	Clement Virgo	Won	
Canadian Screen Awards	April 16, 2023	Best Art Direction/Production Design	Jason Clarke, John Kim, Richard Racicot	Won	
Canadian Screen Awards	April 16, 2023	Best Costume Design	Hanna Puley	Won	
Canadian Screen Awards	April 16, 2023	Best Sound Editing	Jane Tattersall, David McCallum, Paul Germann, Krystin Hunter, Kevin Banks	Won	
Canadian Screen Awards	April 16, 2023	Best Sound Mixing	Richard Penn, Joe Morrow, James Bastable	Won	
Canadian Screen Awards	April 16, 2023	Best Makeup	Joan Chell	Nominated	
Canadian Screen Awards	April 16, 2023	Best Hair	Tremaine Thomas	Won	
Canadian Screen Awards	April 16, 2023	Best Original Score	Todor Kobakov	Won	
Canadian Screen Awards	April 16, 2023	Best Casting in a Film	Deirdre Bowen	Won	
Directors Guild of Canada	October 23, 2023	Best Direction in a Feature Film	Clement Virgo	Nominated	
NAACP Image Awards	March 16, 2024	Outstanding International Motion Picture	Brother	Won	
NAACP Image Awards	March 16, 2024	Outstanding Independent Motion Picture	Brother	Won	
NAACP Image Awards	March 16, 2024	Outstanding Breakthrough Performance in a Motion Picture	Aaron Pierre	Nominated	
NAACP Image Awards	March 16, 2024	Outstanding Cinematography in a Feature Film	Guy Godfree	Nominated	
Toronto Film Critics Association	2022	Rogers Best Canadian Film Award	Brother	Nominated	
Vancouver Film Critics Circle	2022	Best Director of a Canadian Film	Clement Virgo	Nominated	
Vancouver Film Critics Circle	2022	Best Actor in a Canadian Film	Lamar Johnson	Nominated	
Vancouver Film Critics Circle	2022	Best Supporting Actor in a Canadian Film	Aaron Pierre	Nominated	
Vancouver Film Critics Circle	2022	Best Supporting Actress in a Canadian Film	Marsha Stephanie Blake	Nominated	
Vancouver Film Critics Circle	2022	Best Screenplay for a Canadian Film	Clement Virgo	Nominated	
WGC Screenwriting Awards	2023	Feature Film	Clement Virgo	Won	
