= Arctic Song =

- Directed by: Germaine Arnattaujuq; Neil Christopher; Louise Flaherty
- Written by: Germaine Arnattaujuq; Celina Kalluk; Neil Christopher
- Produced by: Neil Christopher; David Christensen; Nadia Mike; Alicia Smith
- Music by: Celina Kalluk
- Animation by: Tindur Peturs; Anne-Marie Latanville; Vivian Zhou; Justin Leal
- Production companies: National Film Board of Canada; Taqqut Productions
- Release date: February 2022 (Available Light)
- Running time: 13 minutes
- Country: Canada

Arctic Song is a Canadian animated short film, directed by Germaine Arnattaujuq, Neil Christopher and Louise Flaherty and released in 2022. The film illustrates the traditional creation myth in Inuit culture, depicting the creation of the land, the sea and the sky.

The film premiered in February 2022 at the Available Light Film Festival.

The film was a Canadian Screen Award nominee for Best Animated Short at the 11th Canadian Screen Awards in 2023.
