= We're All Gonna Die (Even Jay Baruchel) =

Canadian documentary television series

- Presented by: Jay Baruchel
- Country of origin: Canada

Original release
- Network: Crave
- Release: April 30, 2022

We're All Gonna Die (Even Jay Baruchel) is a Canadian documentary television series, which premiered April 30, 2022, on Crave. Hosted by Jay Baruchel, the series explores the science behind various ways in which the end of the human race could come about. The first season featured episodes on asteroids, nuclear war, pandemics, alien invasion, volcanic eruptions and climate change, providing expert insight into both the scope of the challenges and their potential solutions. The series is produced by 90th Parallel Productions. The first season was directed and written by Victoria Lean and was produced by Stuart Henderson, Victoria Lean, and Ben Travers. The second season was directed by Jay Baruchel, and was produced by Stuart Henderson and Javiera Quintana.

The first episode of the series received a preview screening at the 2022 Hot Docs Canadian International Documentary Festival.

The series won four Canadian Screen Awards at the 11th Canadian Screen Awards in 2023, for Best Factual Series, Best Editorial Research (Victoria Lean, Jackie Carlos, Rita Kotzia, Britt Wray, Stuart Henderson, Ben Travers and Simone Zucker), Best Editing in a Factual Program or Series (Kirk Ramsay, Nick Taylor) and Best Direction in a Factual Program or Series (Victoria Lean). It was also nominated for Best Writing in a Factual Program or Series (Victoria Lean).

A second season of the series premiered on Crave in 2024. It features episodes on Artificial Intelligence, Scary Space Shit, Insect Extinction, Nanotechnology, Simulation Theory, and Death.
