= Scrap (2022 Canadian film) =

- Directed by: Stacey Tenenbaum
- Written by: Stacey Tenenbaum
- Produced by: Stacey Tenenbaum
- Cinematography: Katerine Giguère
- Edited by: Howard Goldberg
- Music by: Ramachandra Borcar
- Production company: H2L Productions
- Release date: May 1, 2022 (Hot Docs)
- Running time: 78 minutes
- Country: Canada
- Language: English

Scrap is a Canadian documentary film, directed by Stacey Tenenbaum and released in 2022. The film profiles various people around the world whose lives revolve around finding new uses for abandoned scrap objects, such as living in abandoned vehicles or recycling scrap objects into art or building materials.

Tenenbaum began production on the film in 2019.

The film premiered at the 2022 Hot Docs Canadian International Documentary Festival, and was subsequently acquired for broadcast on the Documentary Channel and CBC Gem.

The film received two Canadian Screen Award nominations at the 11th Canadian Screen Awards in 2023, for Best Cinematography in a Documentary (Katerine Giguère) and Best Original Music in a Documentary (Ramachandra Borcar).
