= The New Reality (TV program) =

Canadian television newsmagazine series

The New Reality is a Canadian television newsmagazine series, which premiered on Global in 2020. The network's return to dedicated newsmagazine programming following the cancellation of 16×9 in 2016, the series features long-form investigative and documentary reports. Dawna Friesen, the network's chief anchor on Global National, hosts the program; unlike some newsmagazine series, however, The New Reality does not have its own dedicated staff, but airs work by all of the Global News team.

The series received a Canadian Screen Award nomination for Best News or Information Segment at the 10th Canadian Screen Awards in 2021, for Mike Armstrong's report "Betty's Story".

The show was cancelled in 2023.
