= The Pretendians =

- Directed by: Drew Hayden Taylor; Paul Kemp
- Written by: Jonathan Baltrusaitis; Paul Kemp; Drew Hayden Taylor
- Produced by: Paul Kemp
- Starring: Drew Hayden Taylor
- Cinematography: Sara Cornthwaite; Tim Hutchison; A.J. Leitch
- Edited by: Jonathan Baltrusaitis
- Music by: Kevin Swartz
- Production company: Paul Kemp Productions
- Distributed by: CBC Television
- Release date: September 30, 2022
- Running time: 44 minutes
- Country: Canada
- Language: English

The Pretendians is a Canadian television documentary film, directed by Drew Hayden Taylor and released in 2022. The film explores the issue of people falsely claiming Indigenous status despite a lack of any documented First Nations, Métis or Inuit heritage, covering the issue from a variety of facets including the production of fake Indigenous art and the efforts to track down a significant false claimant of Indigenous identity who has resisted any efforts to confront him on it.

The film debuted on September 30, 2022, as an episode of The Passionate Eye.

The film won the Donald Brittain Award for best social or political television documentary at the 11th Canadian Screen Awards in 2023.
