= How I Got Here =

2022 Canadian documentary TV series

How I Got Here is a Canadian television documentary series, which premiered in 2022. The series centers on people who were born in Canada or the United States as the children of immigrants, as they accompany their parents on trips back to their former homelands to learn more about the lives their parents left behind.

The series was created by production company Forté Entertainment. It premiered in October 2022 on Super Channel in Canada, and BYUtv in the United States.

It received three Canadian Screen Award nominations at the 11th Canadian Screen Awards in 2023, for Best Factual Program or Series and Best Editing in a Factual Program or Series (Derek Esposito for "Zimbabwe: She Has Arrived", and Vitold Vidic for "Serbia: Two Rivers Intertwined").

== Episodes ==
No.	Title	Directed by	Original release date
1	"Zimbabwe: She Has Arrived"	Jim Morrison	October 8, 2022
2	"Italy: Making Peace and Pizza"	Dylan Reibling	October 9, 2022
3	"Zambia: Born for Greatness"	Robin Bicknell	October 16, 2022
4	"Serbia: Two Rivers Intertwined"	Dylan Reibling	October 23, 2022
5	"Zimbabwe: Like Time Stood Still"	Jim Morrison	November 5, 2022
6	"Slovakia: My Mom the Mountain Goat"	Dylan Reibling	November 6, 2022
7	"Ghana: The Name That You Live"	Jim Morrison	November 13, 2022
8	"Chile: A Tree and Its Roots"	Russell Gienapp	November 20, 2022
9	"Israel: Young Man, Walking Up"	Jim Morrison	December 5, 2022
10	"Mexico: I Belong to This Land"	Dylan Reibling	December 6, 2022
