= Being Black in Canada =

Being Black in Canada is a Canadian television special, which aired on CBC Television and CBC Gem in 2020. Hosted by Asha Tomlinson, the one-hour special aired concurrently with the launch of the Canadian Broadcasting Corporation's dedicated Being Black in Canada web portal for Black Canadian news, and aired news, current affairs and arts programming about Black Canadian issues, including a feature interview with various cast and crew of the influential Black Canadian miniseries The Book of Negroes.

Both the special and the website expanded on programming that the CBC has produced since 2013 for Black History Month under the Being Black in Canada brand.

The special received a Canadian Screen Award nomination for Best Variety or Entertainment Special at the 9th Canadian Screen Awards in 2021.
