= Compulsus =

2022 Canadian film directed by Tara Thorne

- Directed by: Tara Thorne
- Written by: Tara Thorne
- Produced by: Nicole Steeves
- Starring: Lesley Smith
- Cinematography: Cecile Holland
- Edited by: Anna MacLean
- Production company: Paw Paw Pictures
- Release date: June 3, 2022 (Inside Out)
- Running time: 81 minutes
- Country: Canada
- Language: English

Compulsus is a Canadian crime thriller film, directed by Tara Thorne and released in 2022. The film stars Lesley Smith as Wally, a lesbian who embarks on a vigilante crime spree to avenge the sexual assault of women.

Thorne's directorial debut, the film was inspired by Thelma & Louise. Its cast includes Koumbie, Hilary Adams, Kathleen Dorian, Kathryn McCormack and James MacLean.

The film premiered at the 2022 Inside Out Film and Video Festival, and was screened at the 2022 Fantasia Film Festival.
