= Wild Rose Vets =

Canadian documentary television series

Wild Rose Vets is a Canadian documentary television series, which premiered in 2022 on APTN.

The series was originally launched as Dr. Savannah: Wild Rose Vet, and profiled Savannah Howse-Smith, a Métis veterinarian in the Drayton Valley region of Alberta, depicting both her veterinary practice and her own personal exploration of her Métis heritage.

The series was produced by Wapanatahk Media. It was broadcast by APTN in both Cree and English language editions, with the Cree version premiering May 3 and the English edition premiering May 4.

After two seasons centred on Howse-Smith, the series became Wild Rose Vets, shifting its focus to profile indigenous veterinarians Cori Stephen, Allison Hay and Emma Jackson.

The series received two Canadian Screen Award nominations at the 11th Canadian Screen Awards in 2023, for Best Lifestyle Program or Series and Best Photography in a Lifestyle or Reality Program or Series (David Baron for "Purple Saxifrage Vet"). Frederick Kroetsch won the Rosie Award for Best Screenwriter Under 30 Minutes at the 2022 Alberta Film and Television Awards for the episode "Purple Saxifrage Vet".

At the 13th Canadian Screen Awards in 2025, Wild Rose Vets was nominated for Best Lifestyle Program or Series.
