= Dwain Murphy =

Dominica-born Canadian actor

- Born: Roseau, Dominica
- Occupations: Film, Television actor
- Years active: 2006-present

Dwain Murphy is a Dominican-born Canadian actor. He is best known for playing Eric in Degrassi: The Next Generation, Giles in The Line, and Bishop in How She Move. Murphy has made an appearance in Tom Clancy's Splinter Cell: Blacklist doing the voice and physical performance of Isaac Briggs.

== Biography ==
Murphy was born on the Caribbean island of Dominica. After coming to Canada with his parents at the age of four, Murphy was persuaded to start acting and graduated from the Humber College Acting for Film and Television program. He is known for playing the character Bishop in How She Move, and a supporting role as Flipper in Poor Boy's Game. He also works in television and is known for his recurring role as Eric, Marco Del Rossi's boyfriend, in Degrassi: The Next Generation, and for playing Giles, Carlos's brother in The Line. He also had a starring role in the film Saving God as Norris.

Murphy currently resides in Toronto, Ontario. He also has a love for basketball. He is a Catholic.

== Filmography ==
Film
Year	Film	Role	Other notes
2007	How She Move	Bishop	Lead role
2007	Poor Boy's Game	Flipper	Main role
2008	Saving God	Norris Johns	Main role
2015	The Masked Saint	Jojo	
2016	For Love & Honor	Mr. McCallister	Television film
2016	A Family Man	Antoine	
2017	Tuesday, 10:08am	Unknown	Short film
2022	Brother	Dru	
Television
Year	Series	Role	Notes
2006	G-Spot	Player #1	Episode: "Sunburn"
2006–08	Degrassi: The Next Generation	Eric	6 episodes
2008	The Line	Giles	7 episodes
2009	Guns	Baby Dee	TV miniseries (2 episodes)
2009	Three Rivers	Antonio	Episode: "Code Green"
2010	Ghost Whisperer	Private Paul Mace	Episode: "Implosion"
2011	King	Big Mike	Episode: "Cameron Bell"
2011	Warehouse 13	ATF agent	Episode: "The New Guy"
2011	Rookie Blue	Lionel	Episode: "In Plain View"
2011	Combat Hospital	PJ Terrel Ford	Recurring role (12 episodes)
2011	The Mentalist	Dennis Kagan	Episode: "Blood and Sand"
2012	Nikita	Mason	2 episodes
2012	Saving Hope	Shawn Price	Episode: "Pilot"
2013	Cracked	Peter Kovacks	Episode: "Old Soldiers"
2013	Nikita	Male recruit	Episode: "Self-Destruct"
2013	Played	Detective Constable Daniel Price	Main role (5 episodes)
2014	Republic of Doyle	Theo DaCosta	2 episodes
2015	Lost Girl	Clay Jonas	Episode: "Clear Eyes, Fae Hearts"
2015	The Book of Negroes	Claiborne	TV miniseries (2 episodes)
2015	X Company	Walter	Episode: "Sixes & Sevens"
2015	Remedy	Ben LaSalle	3 episodes
2015	Rogue	Eugene "Cups" Harris	5 episodes
2015	Killjoys	Surja	Episode: "Come the Rain"
2015	The Art of More	Odell Watkins	Episode: "The Name of the Game"
2016	Beauty & the Beast	Agent Trahn	Episode: "Beast of Times, Worst of Times"
2016	The Strain	Sean Duncan	4 episodes
2016–17	Mohawk Girls	Leon	Recurring role (11 episodes)
2017	The Mist	Bryan Hunt	2 episodes
2017	Suits	Mark	Episode: "Brooklyn Housing"
2018	Star Trek: Discovery	Captain Maddox	2 episodes
2018	Little Dog	Rico "Havoc" St. George	TV miniseries
2018	Titans	Larry Trainor / Negative Man	Episode: "Doom Patrol"
2020	Utopia Falls	Moore Times	series regular
2022	Revenge of the Black Best Friend	Calvin	
2025	Skillsville	Cedrick	
2026–present	Phoebe and Jay	Craig	
Video games
Year	Video game	Role	Notes
2013	Tom Clancy's Splinter Cell: Blacklist	Isaac Briggs	Also motion capture double
2016	Watch Dogs 2	Unknown	
