= Beautiful Scars (film) =

2022 Canadian documentary film

- Directed by: Shane Belcourt
- Written by: Shane Belcourt
- Produced by: Corey Russell
- Starring: Tom Wilson
- Cinematography: Jon Elliott
- Edited by: Marc Ricciardelli; Taylor G. McConnachie; Katie Flach
- Music by: Tom Wilson
- Production company: Cream Films
- Release date: May 2, 2022 (Hot Docs)
- Running time: 91 minutes
- Country: Canada
- Language: English

Beautiful Scars is a Canadian documentary film, directed by Shane Belcourt and released in 2022. Starring musician Tom Wilson and based in part on his 2017 memoir of the same name, the film depicts his exploration of the Mohawk heritage that was hidden from him by his adoptive parents until he was almost 60 years old, including his process of reconnecting and building a relationship with his birth mother.

The film premiered at the 2022 Hot Docs Canadian International Documentary Festival, where it was one of the top ten films in the Hot Docs Audience Award race.

The film received a Canadian Screen Award nomination for Best Biography or Arts Documentary Program or Series at the 11th Canadian Screen Awards in 2023.
