= The Black Academy (Canada) =

The Black Academy is a Canadian academy for the recognition of talent and fostering of Black Canadians in various industries. It is a division of B.L.A.C.K. Canada (Building a Legacy in Acting, Cinema + Knowledge), an organization founded by Canadian actors Shamier Anderson and Stephan James in 2020.

The organization has partnered with Insight Productions to launch an annual Legacy Awards ceremony to honour Black Canadian achievement in film, television, music, sports, and culture, which launched in 2022. The awards ceremony was held on the last Sunday of September and have already secured a commitment from the Canadian Broadcasting Corporation (CBC) to broadcast the ceremony for at least the first three years, from 2022 through 2024.

The first Legacy Awards were broadcast on September 25, 2022, with the honorees announced as Andre De Grasse, Kayla Grey and Fabienne Colas. The honorees in 2023 were Tonya Williams, Director X, Jully Black, and Lu Kala, with the 2024 ceremony honoring Kardinal Offishall, Cameron Bailey and Weyni Mengesha.

The Legacy Awards were discontinued in 2025, with the CBC instead collaborating with Anderson and James on The Legacy Lounge, a new talk show profiling and interviewing Black Canadian figures to air during Black History Month. The series will feature interviews with businessman Wes Hall, actress Amanda Brugel, singer Fefe Dobson and social media stars Basement Gang.
