= Kings of Coke =

- Based on: Montreal's Irish Mafia by D'Arcy O'Connor
- Written by: Nick Rose; Julian Sher
- Directed by: Julian Sher
- Music by: Ramachandra Borcar
- Country of origin: Canada
- Original language: English

Production
- Producers: Andre Barro; Annie Bourdeau; Michael Kronish
- Cinematography: Geoffroy Beauchemin
- Editor: Benjamin Duffield
- Running time: 83 minutes
- Production companies: Connect Three; Urbania

Original release
- Network: Crave
- Release: November 7, 2022

Kings of Coke is a Canadian documentary film, directed by Julian Sher and released in 2022. Based on D'Arcy O'Connor's book Montreal's Irish Mafia, the film is a profile of the West End Gang, an organized crime ring that began in the Pointe-Saint-Charles neighbourhood of Montreal in the 1950s.

The film premiered November 7, 2022 on Crave.

The film received a Canadian Screen Award nomination for Best Documentary Program at the 11th Canadian Screen Awards in 2023.
