= Come Clean (2022 film) =

- Directed by: Neil Graham; Derreck Roemer
- Written by: Neil Graham; Derreck Roemer
- Produced by: Neil Graham; Derreck Roemer
- Cinematography: Derreck Roemer
- Edited by: Derreck Roemer
- Music by: Michael Timmins
- Production company: Insurgent Projects
- Distributed by: TVOntario
- Release date: January 25, 2022
- Running time: 89 minutes
- Country: Canada
- Language: English

Come Clean is a Canadian television documentary film, directed by Neil Graham and Derreck Roemer and released in 2022. The film profiles several drug addicts who are in rehabilitation at the Westover Treatment Centre in Thamesville, Ontario.

The film premiered on January 25, 2022, on TVOntario.

The film was a nominee for the Donald Brittain Award for best social or political television documentary at the 11th Canadian Screen Awards in 2023.
