= The Porter (TV series) =

Canadian television drama series

- Created by: Arnold Pinnock; Bruce Ramsay
- Country of origin: Canada
- Original language: English
- No. of seasons: 1
- No. of episodes: 8

Production
- Executive producers: Arnold Pinnock; Bruce Ramsay; Annmarie Morais; Marsha Greene; Charles Officer; R.T. Thorne; Jennifer Kawaja; Ian Dimerman
- Running time: 46–54 min.
- Production companies: Inferno Pictures Inc. Sienna Films

Original release
- Network: CBC Television; BET+
- Release: 21 February 2022

The Porter is a Canadian-American television drama series created by Arnold Pinnock and Bruce Ramsay which premiered on CBC Television on February 21, 2022, and on BET+ in the United States on May 5, 2022. It depicts the story of the first Black Canadian labour union in North America.

The series is a co-production between The CBC and the Paramount Global-owned streaming service, BET+. (Note: a joint venture between Paramount's BET Media Group and Tyler Perry Studios) It was released to positive reviews, and became the most nominated show at the 11th Canadian Screen Awards. Due to the lack of a co-production partner after BET pulled out, The Porter was cancelled after one season.

== Premise ==
The series depicts the history of Black Canadian and African-American men who worked as Pullman porters in the period following World War I, leading to the 1925 creation of the Brotherhood of Sleeping Car Porters as the first Black-led labour union. Much of the setting for the series is the St. Antoine neighborhood, a Black community of Montreal.

== Cast ==
- Aml Ameen as Junior Massey, a porter with the transcontinental railroad
- Ronnie Rowe Jr. as Zeke Garrett, a porter and war buddy of Junior
- Mouna Traoré as Marlene Massey, a worker with the Black Cross Nurses
- Alfre Woodard as Fay, a Montréal business owner
- Oluniké Adeliyi as Queenie, a powerful Chicago crime boss
- Loren Lott as Lucy, a performer
- Djouliet Amara as Corrine
- Arnold Pinnock as Glenford
- Bruce Ramsay as Dinger
- Luke Bilyk as Franklin Edwards
- Jahron Wilson as Teddy Massey, Junior and Marlene's son

== Episodes ==
No.	Title	Directed by	Written by	Original release date
1	"Pilot"	Charles Officer	Annmarie Morais and Aubrey Nealon	February 21, 2022
2	"Background"	Charles Officer	Story by : Aubrey Nealon & Bruce Ramsay & Arnold Pinnock and Annmarie Morais; Teleplay by : Annmarie Morais	February 28, 2022
3	"Starting Over"	R.T. Thorne	Annmarie Morais	March 7, 2022
4	"Who's Next"	R.T. Thorne	Marsha Greene	March 14, 2022
5	"Working on It"	Charles Officer	Andrew Burrows-Trotman	March 21, 2022
6	"Make Me Feel"	Charles Officer	Priscilla M. White	March 28, 2022
7	"Our Turn Now"	R.T. Thorne	Bruce Ramsay & Arnold Pinnock	April 4, 2022
8	"Death is Funny"	R.T. Thorne	Marsha Greene	April 11, 2022

== Production ==
=== Development ===
On 10 December 2020, CBC Television and BET+ announced that they would be partnering on the creation of a series about a group of railway workers who formed the first Black-led labour union. The series from Inferno Picture and Sienna Films was created by Arnold Pinnock and Bruce Ramsay, with the participation of Annmarie Morais, Marsha Greene, Charles Officer and R.T. Thorne as producers, with Officer and Thorne also directing. The series is written by Morais, Greene, Andrew Burrows-Trotman, Priscilla White, Pinnock and Ramsay, with R.T. Thorne participating in the writers' room. Filming took place primarily in Winnipeg, Manitoba, Canada between June and September 2021.

=== Casting ===
In April 2021 CBC and BET+ announced the main cast was slated to include Aml Ameen, Ronnie Rowe Jr., Mouna Traoré. In June Oluniké Adeliyi and Loren Lott joined the cast, with creators Arnold Pinnock and Bruce Ramsay also taking on series regular roles. In July 2021, it was announced that Alfre Woodard would be joining the cast in a recurring role.

Thorne stated that there was "so much incredible talent across this country" from which to cast for the series.

== Reception ==
The series has received positive reviews from critics. On the review aggregation website Rotten Tomatoes, The Porter holds an approval rating of 100% with an average rating of 8.4 out of 10, based on 7 reviews. A review in The Globe and Mail called the show "great TV...with compelling characters" and referred to it as "one sexy show".

The Porter was the most nominated show at the 11th Canadian Screen Awards, leading with 19 nominations, and winning a record 12.

Despite interest from the CBC, The Porter was canceled after one season due to the BET Media Group pulling out of financing. According to executive producer Jennifer Kawaja "there was a lack of interest in 'the Canadian point of view.'” While accepting the Academy Board of Directors’ Tribute Award, Indigenous actor, director and producer Jennifer Podemski issued a call to the federal government “to increase permanent funding" for Indigenous Screen Office.
