= The Perfect Story =

- Directed by: Michelle Shephard
- Produced by: Bryn Hughes; Lea Marin; Michelle Shephard; Nick Hector
- Cinematography: Wes Legge
- Edited by: Nick Hector
- Music by: Justin Small; Ohad Benchetrit
- Production company: Frequent Flyer Films
- Distributed by: National Film Board of Canada
- Release date: September 29, 2022 (CIFF)
- Running time: 73 minutes
- Country: Canada
- Language: English

The Perfect Story is a 2022 Canadian documentary film directed by Michelle Shephard. The film revisits Shephard's 2010 news story about Ismael Abdulle, a young Somali man whose hand and foot were amputated by Al-Shabaab militants. Her initial reportage sparked a campaign to get him transported to another country as a refugee. However, the documentary explores the ethical dilemmas Shephard faced when Abdulle later admitted he had lied about key details of the incident, revealing he was guilty of armed robbery just as Al-Shabaab had claimed, in contrast to his previous claims that the amputation was punishment for refusing the join the group.

== Background ==
In June 2009 in Mogadishu, Al-Shabaab publicly amputated the right hand and left foot of four young men - Ismael Khalif Abdulle, Abdulqadir Abdi Dilahow, Ali Mohamed Gedi, and Jeylani Mohamed Had (Note: The spelling of the names of the four men varies significantly among sources.) who were accused of theft. Ismael Khalif Abdulle was only 17 years old at the time he was amputated. He gave an interview to Canadian journalist for the Toronto Star, Michelle Shephard, and told her that al-Shabab tried to recruit him but he refused and told them he wanted to stay in school instead. She did not try to verify his story, and uncritically reported his version of events in the Toronto Star. That version of events was subsequently reported in major newspapers, including The Guardian.

However, Abdulle later recanted some parts of his story, and admitted that Al-Shabab's accusations that he was robbing people at gunpoint was true. An al-Shabab member who saw him robbing people asked if he could see his gun, and when she showed it off to him, the al-Shabab member took the gun and pointed it at him and told him he was under arrest. However, the key part of the story that al-Shabab cut off his hand and foot was true. The film focuses on the plight of Ismail Khalif Abdulle and the repercussion's of Shephard's failure to properly vet his version of events.

== Reception ==
The film premiered at the 2022 Calgary International Film Festival, where it won the DGC Canadian Documentary Award. It was also screened at the Hot Docs Ted Rogers Cinema in Toronto as the opening film of the annual Doc Soup fall screening series, and had its television premiere on TVO on October 18.

The film received two nominations at the 11th Canadian Screen Awards in 2023, for Best Documentary Program and Best Original Music in a Documentary (Ohad Benchetrit, Justin Small).

== See also ==
- Nayirah testimony
