= Jesse Wente =

Chairperson, Canada Council for the Arts, indigenous rights activist

Jesse Wente (born April 1974) is a First Nations Canadian arts journalist and chairperson of the Canada Council for the Arts. He is an Ojibwe member of Serpent River First Nation.

== Background ==
Jesse Wente was born in Toronto, Ontario in April 1974 to an American father and Anishinaabe mother. His maternal grandmother Norma was Indigenous from the Serpent River First Nation. His paternal grandparents were executives. He attended the Toronto private school Crescent School. He received funding from the federal government through the National Aboriginal Achievement Foundation (later Indspire) to attend the University of Toronto where he studied cinema studies. He graduated in 1996.

== Career ==
Wente broadcast for CBC Radio One's Metro Morning on films and pop culture for 20 years, and was appointed as chair of the board of the Canada Council for the Arts in 2020.

An outspoken advocate for Indigenous rights and First Nations, Métis, and Inuit art, Wente is active in a number of areas in the sphere of Canadian media.

He has been a culture critic with Metro Morning for more than 20 years and on CBC Radio One's national Unreserved program. Wente is actively involved in Canadian film in a number of roles and is an advocate for increasing the presence of underrepresented voices. He previously served as director of film programmes at the TIFF Bell Lightbox, where he oversaw theatrical, Cinematheque and Film Circuit programming.

Wente was named as the first director of Canada's new Indigenous Screen Office in January 2018. This program of the Canadian federal government is intended to support the development, production and marketing of Indigenous screen content and storytelling in Canada.

He was appointed to the board of the Canada Council for the Arts in 2017 and became its chairperson in July 2020. Previously, he served as director of the Toronto Arts Council.

Wente's first memoir, Unreconciled: Family, Truth, and Indigenous Resistance, was published in September 2021. His second, Tough Lies: Indigenous Belonging and My Healing Through Golf, was published in October 2026.

== Personal life ==
Wente is married and has two children.

== Awards ==
- Reelworld Film Festival’s Reel Activist Award.

== Authored books ==
- Wente, Jesse (2021). Unreconciled: Family, Truth, and Indigenous Resistance. Toronto: Allen Lane. ISBN 978-0-7352-3573-1. OCLC 1224541561.
- Wente, Jesse (2026). Tough Lies: Indigenous Belonging and My Healing Through Golf. Toronto: Allen Lane. ISBN 978-0-7352-5076-5.
