= Lido TV =

Canadian web television variety show

Lido TV is a Canadian web television variety show, which premiered on CBC Gem in 2022. Created by musician Lido Pimienta as a creative outlet after the COVID-19 pandemic halted her ability to tour in support of her 2020 album Miss Colombia, the series presents perspectives on various social issues through a blend of sketch comedy, puppetry and musical performances by Pimienta and special guests including Nelly Furtado, Shad, Kittie and The Halluci Nation.

The series premiered on September 23. In advance of its television debut, it screened in the Primetime program at the 2022 Toronto International Film Festival.
