= 2022 Festival du nouveau cinéma =

Film festival in Montreal, Canada

- Opening film: Falcon Lake by Charlotte Le Bon
- Closing film: The Five Devils by Léa Mysius
- Location: Montreal, Quebec, Canada
- Founded: 1971
- Festival date: October 5–16, 2022
- Website: nouveaucinema.ca/en

Festival du nouveau cinéma
- 2023 2021

The 2022 edition of the Festival du nouveau cinéma, the 51st edition in the event's history, took place from October 5 to 16, 2022 in Montreal, Quebec, Canada. It was marked by a return to full in-theatre staging following the COVID-19 pandemic having forced the festival to proceed fully or partially online in 2020 and 2021.

The festival opened with Charlotte Le Bon's film Falcon Lake, and closed with Léa Mysius's The Five Devils (Les Cinq diables).

== Awards ==
Award winners were announced on October 15 at the conclusion of the festival.

Award	Film	Filmmaker
National Competition, Grand Prize	The Maiden	Graham Foy
National Competition, Honorable Mention	Before I Change My Mind	Trevor Anderson
National Competition, Prix de la diffusion Québécor	Late Night Walks (Promenades nocturnes)	Ryan McKenna
International Competition, Grand Prize	Aftersun	Charlotte Wells
International Competition, Prix de l’innovation Daniel Langlois	This House (Cette maison)	Miryam Charles
International Competition, Best Acting Performance	Aftersun	Paul Mescal
International Competition, Best Acting Performance Honorable Mentions	A Piece of Sky	Elin Zgraggen
International Competition, Best Acting Performance Honorable Mentions	Love According to Dalva	Zelda Samson
International Competition, Best Acting Performance Honorable Mentions	Aftersun	Frankie Corio
International Competition, Best Acting Performance Honorable Mentions	Stone Turtle	Samara Kenzo
International Competition, Best Acting Performance Honorable Mentions	The Worst Ones (Les Pires)	Ensemble cast
International Competition, FIPRESCI Prize	How to Save a Dead Friend	Marusya Syroechkovskaya
New Alchemists Prize	Super Natural	Jorge Jácome
Temps 0 Public Prize	2012/Through the Heart (2012/Dans le cœur)	Rodrigue Jean, Arnaud Valade
P'tits Loups	Le Garçon et l'éléphant	Sonia Gerbeaud
P'tits Loups, Special Mention	La Naissance des oasis	Marion Jamault
P'tits Loups, Special Mention	Ice Merchants	João Gonzalez
FNC Explore Panorama Prize	21–22 China	Thierry Loa
FNC Explore Horizon Prize	From the Main Square	Pedro Harres
National Competition, Short Film	Standardized Patient Program (Programme d'utilisation des patients standardisés)	Yan Giroux
National Competition, Short Film Honorable Mention	Dhulpa	Kunsang Kyirong
National Competition, Short Film Public Prize	Simo	Aziz Zoromba
International Competition, Short Film	Will My Parents Come to See Me	Mo Harawe
International Competition, Short Film Honorable Mention	Twin Lakes Haven	Philbert Aimé Mbabazi Sharangabo
New Alchemists, Animated Short Film	Backflip	Nikita Diakur
New Alchemists, Animated Short Film Honorable Mention	All My Scars Vanish in the Wind	Angelica Restrepo, Carlos Velandia
New Alchemists, National Dada Prize	I Thought the World of You	Kurt Walker
New Alchemists, National Dada Prize Honorable Mention	In the Heavens and on Earth (Dans les cieux et sur la terre)	Erin Weisgerber
New Alchemists, International Dada Prize	The Sower of Stars	Lois Patiño
RPCÉ Grand Prize	Going Back to Meet the World	Santi Henderson
RPCÉ Honorable Mention	Bedroom People	Vivien Forsans
RCPÉ Jeune Loup Prize	Avant de partir, repeins ma joue	Cassandra Minisini, Marilou Labbé
Pitch Première Oeuvre	Ce qui hante Marlène	Camille Trudel
Pitch Première Oeuvre, Special Mention	La Professeure	Eva Kabuya, Catherine Boily, Rosalie Chicoine Perreault
Nouveau Marché	Demba	Mamadou Dia

== Official selections ==
=== International Competition ===
English title	Original title	Director(s)	Production country
Aftersun		Charlotte Wells	United Kingdom
How to Save a Dead Friend		Marusya Syroechkovskaya	Sweden, Norway, France, Germany
Love According to Dalva	Dalva	Emmanuelle Nicot	Belgium, France
Mutzenbacher		Ruth Beckermann	Austria
A Piece of Sky	Drii Winter	Michael Koch	Germany, Switzerland
Stone Turtle		Woo Ming Jin	Malaysia, Indonesia
This House	Cette maison	Miryam Charles	Canada
Will-o'-the-Wisp	Fogo-Fátuo	João Pedro Rodrigues	Portugal, France
The Worst Ones	Les Pires	Lise Akoka, Romane Gueret	France

=== National Competition ===
English title	Original title	Director(s)	Production country
Before I Change My Mind		Trevor Anderson	Canada
Coyote	Le Coyote	Katherine Jerkovic	Canada
Diaspora		Deco Dawson	Canada
Late Night Walks	Promenades nocturnes	Ryan McKenna	Canada
The Maiden		Graham Foy	Canada
Night Detour	Détour de nuit	Ariane Falardeau St-Amour, Paul Chotel	Canada
Queens of the Qing Dynasty		Ashley McKenzie	Canada
So Much Tenderness		Lina Rodriguez	Canada
Soft		Joseph Amenta	Canada

=== International Panorama ===
English title	Original title	Director(s)	Production country
Alcarràs		Carla Simón	Spain, Italy
Alma Viva		Cristèle Alves Meira	France, Portugal, Belgium
Broadway		Christos Massalas	Greece, France, Romania
Butterfly Vision		Maksym Nakonechnyi	Ukraine, Czech Republic, Croatia, Sweden
Call of the Mountain	La Montagne	Thomas Salvador	France
Dos Estaciones		Juan Pablo González	Mexico, France
Kite Zo A: Leave the Bones	Kite Zo A: Laisse les os	Kaveh Nabatian	Haiti, Canada
Klondike		Maryna Er Gorbach	Ukraine
Leila's Brothers	Barādarān-e Leilā	Saeed Roustayi	Iran
Liturgy of Anti-Tank Obstacles		Dmytro Sukholytkyy-Sobchuk	Ukraine, United States
The Middle Ages	La Edad Media	Alejo Moguillansky, Luciana Acuña	Argentina
Pamfir		Dmytro Sukholytkyy-Sobchuk	Ukraine, Poland, France, Luxembourg
Plan 75		Chie Hayakawa	Japan, Philippines, France
Rule 34	Regra 34	Julia Murat	Brazil, France
Shall I Compare You to a Summer's Day?	Bastaalak sa'at	Mohammad Shawky Hassan	Egypt, Germany, Lebanon
Small, Slow But Steady		Shô Miyake	Japan, France
The Strange Case of Jacky Caillou	Jacky Caillou	Lucas Delangle	France

=== The New Alchemists (Les Nouveaux alchimistes) ===
English title	Original title	Director(s)	Production country
Anyox		Ryan Ermacora, Jessica Johnson	Canada
De Humani Corporis Fabrica		Lucien Castaing-Taylor, Véréna Paravel	France, Switzerland
Human Flowers of Flesh		Helena Wittmann	France, Germany
Killing the Eunuch Khan		Abed Abest	Iran
Phi 1.618		Theodore Ushev	Bulgaria, Canada
Super Natural		Jorge Jácome	Portugal
W		Anna Eriksson	Finland
A Woman Escapes		Sofia Bohdanowicz, Blake Williams, Burak Çevik	Canada, Turkey

=== The Essentials (Les Incontournables) ===
English title	Original title	Director(s)	Production country
The Banshees of Inisherin		Martin McDonagh	United Kingdom, Ireland, United States
Coma		Bertrand Bonello	France
Continental Drift (South)	La dérive des continents (au sud)	Lionel Baier	France, Switzerland
Decision to Leave		Park Chan-wook	South Korea
EO		Jerzy Skolimowski	Poland, Italy
No Bears		Jafar Panahi	Iran
The Novelist's Film	Soseolgaui Yeonghwa	Hong Sang-soo	South Korea
Pacifiction	Tourment sur les îles	Albert Serra	France, Spain, Germany, Portugal
Petrov's Flu	Petrovy v grippe	Kirill Serebrennikov	Russia, France, Switzerland, Germany, United States
Rimini		Ulrich Seidl	Austria, France, Germany
Sparta		Ulrich Seidl	Austria, France, Germany
Tchaikovsky's Wife	Zhena Chaikovskogo	Kirill Serebrennikov	Russia, France, Switzerland
Tori and Lokita	Tori et Lokita	Jean-Pierre and Luc Dardenne	Belgium, France
White Noise		Noah Baumbach	United States
Women Talking		Sarah Polley	United States

=== Temps 0 ===
English title	Original title	Director(s)	Production country
2012/Through the Heart	2012/Dans le cœur	Rodrigue Jean, Arnaud Valade	Canada
Dead for a Dollar		Walter Hill	United States
Everything Will Be OK		Rithy Panh	France, Cambodia
Extreme Prejudice		Walter Hill	United States
Grand Paris		Martin Jauvat	France
Harmony		Céline Gailleurd, Olivier Bohler	France
Holy Spider	Ankabut-e moqaddas	Ali Abbasi	Germany, Denmark, France, Sweden
Inexorable		Fabrice Du Welz	France, Belgium
Jerk		Gisèle Vienne	France
Love Is a Dog from Hell		Khavn De La Cruz	Philippines, Germany
Made in Ugana: The Very Special Seance		Kenichi Ugana	Japan
Man Bites Dog	C'est arrivé près de chez vous	Rémy Belvaux, Benoît Poelvoorde, André Bonzel	Belgium
November	Novembre	Cédric Jimenez	France
Smoking Causes Coughing	Fumer fait tousser	Quentin Dupieux	France
Sticking Together	En même temps	Benoît Delépine, Gustave Kervern	France
Unicorn Wars		Alberto Vázquez	Spain, France
The Warriors		Walter Hill	United States

=== Special Presentations ===
English title	Original title	Director(s)	Production country
About Sasha	Chair tendre	Jérémy Mainguy, Yaël Langmann	France
Baby Driver		Edgar Wright	United States, United Kingdom
Call Jane		Phyllis Nagy	United States
Drive		Nicolas Winding Refn	United States
The Driver		Walter Hill	United States
Ever Deadly		Tanya Tagaq, Chelsea McMullan	Canada
For the Sake of Peace		Thomas Sametin, Christophe Castagne	France
Motel Paradis		Sophie Deraspe	Canada
Reign Supreme	Le Monde de demain	Katell Quillévéré, Hélier Cisterne	France
Somewhere Boy		Alex Winckler, Alexandra Brodski	United Kingdom
Tampopo		Juzo Itami	Japan
Theodore Ushev: Unseen Connections	Théodore Ushev: liens invisibles	Borislav Kolev	Bulgaria, Canada
The Velvet Queen	La panthère des neiges	Marie Amiguet, Vincent Munier	France

=== History of Cinema ===
English title	Original title	Director(s)	Production country
Escape to the Silver Globe	Ucieczka na srebrny glob	Kuba Mikurda	Poland
Flickering Ghosts of Loves Gone By	Et j'aime à la fureur	André Bonzel	France
Italia, Fire and Ashes	Italia. Il fuoco, la cenere	Céline Gailleurd, Olivier Bohler	France, Italy
The Mother and the Whore	La maman et la putain	Jean Eustache	France
On the Silver Globe	Na srebrnym globie	Andrzej Żuławski	Poland
Samurai Wolf		Hideo Gosha	Japan
The Sex of the Stars	Le Sexe des étoiles	Paule Baillargeon	Canada
Violent Streets		Hideo Gosha	Japan

=== Retrospective: Bruce LaBruce, Tender and Transgressive ===
English title	Original title	Director(s)	Production country
The Affairs of Lidia		Bruce La Bruce	Canada
Boy, Girl		Bruce La Bruce	Canada
Bruce and Pepper Wayne Gacy's Home Movies		Bruce La Bruce, Candy Parker	Canada
Défense de fumer		Bruce La Bruce	Canada
Gerontophilia		Bruce La Bruce	Canada
I Know What It's Like to Be Dead		Bruce La Bruce	Canada
Interview with a Zombie		Bruce La Bruce, Candy Parker	Canada
It is Not the Pornographer That is Perverse...		Bruce La Bruce	United States, Germany
L.A. Zombie		Bruce La Bruce	United States, Germany
The Misandrists		Bruce La Bruce	Germany
Pierrot Lunaire		Bruce La Bruce	Canada, Germany
Saint-Narcisse		Bruce La Bruce	Canada
Sexbombs		Bruce La Bruce, Candy Parker	Canada
Skin Flick		Bruce La Bruce	Canada
Slam!		Bruce La Bruce	Canada
The Thing from the Lake		Éric Falardeau	Canada
Ulrike's Brain		Bruce La Bruce	Canada, Germany
Valentin, Pierre and Catalina		Bruce La Bruce	Spain

=== International Competition for Short Films ===
English title	Original title	Director(s)	Production country
Airhostess-737		Thanasis Neofotistos	Greece
Anabase		Benjamin Goubet	Switzerland
Big Bang		Carlos Segundo	France, Brazil
Cherries	Uogos	Vytautas Katkus	Lithuania
Datsun		Mark Albiston	New Zealand
Everything At Once		Henryk Dyb Zwart	Norway
Fence		Hilke Rönnfeldt	Denmark, Germany
Fire at the Lake	Le feu au lac	Pierre Menahem	France
Haulout		Evgenia Arbugaeva, Maxim Arbugaev	United Kingdom, Russia
I Am Good at Karate		Jess Dadds	United Kingdom
Insieme Insieme		Bernardo Zanotta	France, Netherlands
Manta Ray	Raie Manta	Anton Bialas	France
On Xerxes' Throne	Ston throno tou Xerxi	Evi Kalogiropoulou	Greece
Poitiers		Jérôme Reybaud	France
Tea and Time	Le thé et le temps	Salah El Amri	Switzerland
Trap		Anastasia Veber	Russia, Lithuania
Twin Lakes Haven		Philbert Aimé Mbabazi Sharangabo	Rwanda
Watch the Fire or Burn Inside It	Il faut regarder le feu ou brûler dedans	Caroline Poggi, Jonathan Vinel	France
Will My Parents Come to See Me		Mo Harawe	Austria, Germany, Somalia
Worth Your Weight in Gold	O Teu Peso em Ouro	Sandro Aguilar	Portugal

=== National Competition for Short Films ===
English title	Original title	Director(s)	Province
III		Salomé Villeneuve	Quebec
À la vie à l'amor		Émilie Mannering	Quebec
About Memory and Loss	Notes sur la mémoire et l'oubli	Amélie Hardy	Quebec
At Dusk	Au crépuscule	Miryam Charles	Quebec
Bird's Nest	Nid d'oiseau	Nadia Louis-Desmarchais	Quebec
Blond Night	Nuit blonde	Gabrielle Demers	Quebec
Danny Greenwood U Shitface	Danny Greenwood T laid	Guillaume Laurin	Quebec
Dhulpa		Kunsang Kyirong	British Columbia
Ditch		Nellie Carrier	Quebec
Down the Orchard	Le Long du verger	William Hayes-Dulude	Quebec
Invincible		Vincent René-Lortie	Quebec
It's What Each Person Needs		Sophy Romvari	Ontario
Late Summer		Ryan Steel	Manitoba
Lay Me by the Shore		David Findlay	Quebec
The Lauzon Theory	La théorie Lauzon	Marie-Josée Saint-Pierre	Quebec
Little Deaths	Petites morts	Terence Chotard	Quebec
Most of the Time We Are Just Waiting		Molly Shears	Ontario
Mother's Skin		Leah Johnston	Nova Scotia
Nanitic		Carol Nguyen	Quebec
No Ghost in the Morgue		Marilyn Cooke	Quebec
Oasis		Justine Martin	Quebec
Pleasure Garden		Rita Ferrando	Ontario
Rocket Fuel		Jessie Posthumus	Ontario
Scaring Women at Night		Karimah Zakia Issa	Ontario
See You in My Dreams	Visites nocturnes silencieuses	Ariane Louis-Seize	Quebec
Simo		Aziz Zoromba	Quebec
Standardized Patient Program	Programme d'utilisation des patients standardisés	Yan Giroux	Quebec

=== Special Presentations Short Films ===
The short films of Trevor Anderson.

English title	Original title	Director(s)	Country
Carpet Diem		Trevor Anderson	Canada
DINX		Trevor Anderson	Canada
Docking		Trevor Anderson	Canada
Figs in Motion		Trevor Anderson	Canada
The High Level Bridge		Trevor Anderson	Canada
The Island		Trevor Anderson	Canada
Jesse Jams		Trevor Anderson	Canada
The Little Deputy		Trevor Anderson	Canada
The Man That Got Away		Trevor Anderson	Canada
Punchlines		Trevor Anderson	Canada
Rock Pockets		Trevor Anderson	Canada
Rugburn		Trevor Anderson	Canada

=== The New Alchemists, Short Films ===
English title	Original title	Director(s)	Production country
Against Reality		Olivia Peace	United States
All My Scars Vanish in the Wind		Carlos Velandia, Angelica Restrepo	Colombia
Arrest in Flight		Adrian Flury	Switzerland
Backflip		Nikita Diakur	Germany, France
A Body Is a Body Is a Body		Eiméar McClay, Cat McClay	United Kingdom
Bye Bye Now		Louise Bourque	Canada
Fenix		Olivia Lathuillière	Canada
Gods of the Supermarket	Les Dieux du supermarché	Alberto Gonzales Morales	Switzerland
Happy New Year, Jim		Andrea Gatopoulos	Italy
Hardly Working		Total Refusal	Austria
Horizons		Charlie Marois	Canada
I Thought the World of You		Kurt Walker	Canada
In the Heavens and on Earth	Dans les cieux et sur la terre	Erin Weisgerber	Canada
Instant Life		Andrew Kim, Anja Dornieden, Juan David Gonzalez Monroy	Germany, United States
It's Raining Frogs Outside		Maria Estela Paiso	Philippines
Lake of Fire		Neozoon	Germany
Lockdown Dreamscape		Nicolas Gebbe	Germany
Message of an Endless Night		Tiago Minamisawa, Barcabogante	Brazil
Municipal Relaxation Module		Matthew Rankin	Canada
Par vents et marées		Bogdan Anifrani-Fedach	Canada
Rien ne sera plus comme avant		Elina Lôwensohn	France
Sirens		Ilaria Di Carlo	Germany
Sometimes I Don't Know Where the Sun	Manchmal weiss ich nicht wo die Sonne	Samantha Aquilino	Switzerland
Songs for Living		Alex Gvojic, Korakrit Arunanondchai	United States, Thailand
The Spiral		Maria Silvia Esteve	Argentina
The Sower of Stars		Lois Patiño	Spain
Tomorrow Is a Water Palace	El mañana es un palacio de agua	Juanita Onzaga	Colombia, Belgium, Mexico, Italy
Tongue		Kaho Yoshida	Canada, Japan
Under the Lake		Thanasis Trouboukis	Greece, Finland
Under the Microscope		Michaela Grill, Sophie Trudeau	Canada, Austria
Very, Very Tremendously		Guangli Liu	France, China

=== RPCÉ Canadian Student Short Film Competition ===
English title	Original title	Director(s)	Province
After Today	Après aujourd'hui	Quebec	
Animal		Félix-Olivier Fiset	Quebec
Bedroom People		Vivien Forsans	Quebec
The Camel	Le Chameau	Emma Jacquerez	Quebec
Canti Vi		Emil Vargas	British Columbia
Core	Avant de partir, repeins ma joue	Marilou Labbé, Casandra G. Minisini	Quebec
The Death of the Lovers	La mort des amants	Élisabeth Groulx	Quebec
Dirty		Farah Moreau	Nova Scotia
Eat Me	Mange-moi	Maël Zaïd, Océane Richer	Quebec
Embrace	Pour t'enlacer	Alicia Tremblay	Quebec
Garden of Shadows	Jardin d'ombres	Aurélie Galibois, Nicolas Roy, Éliot Ducharme, Philippe Carrier, Frédéric Blanchard	Quebec
Going Back to Meet the World		Santi Henderson	British Columbia
Granny and Grandpop	Mamie et Grand-Pôpa	Émilie Lapierre	Quebec
Homesick		Alexandre Thériault	Quebec
Il n'y avait rien		Alexandre Lavigne	Quebec
Kaleidoscope	Kaléidoscope	Carol-Ann Champagne, Oussama Fetoui, Pierre Desbois, Thomas Faso, Arnaud Wurm-Munoz, Lucie Humbert	Quebec
Kung Flop		Luc Savu-Massé, Yuri Lacombe	Quebec
Mathieu		Victoria Lévesque, Annabelle Jacques, Justine Michaud	Quebec
Mommy Milk	Crème maman	Juliette Maurice	Quebec
Nimbus	Nimbe	Lili Francke-Robitaille	Quebec
Nunavut: Changing Times		Timothy Harrison	Nunavut
Problems of Synchronization	Problèmes de synchronization	Charles Gourde Talbot	Quebec
Project Paradise		Aida Solorzano	Quebec
Slush	Gadoue	Charlie Côté	Quebec
The Sorrow of a Confined	Sonata d'une confinée	Bruno Savard	Quebec
Uncovering		J.P. Bergeron	Quebec
Unwanted Photons		Kasia Beloussov	Ontario
Volitantes		Matt Gillott	Alberta
We Are Not Speaking the Same Language		Danika St-Laurent	Quebec
We Were Never There	On n'existe plus	Louca Lefebvre, Maïcha Lazo-Mackay, Rose Robert	Quebec

=== Student short films not in competition ===
English title	Original title	Director(s)	Country
L'Atelier		Namaï Kham Po	Canada
Le bonheur est comme du sable		Gaëlle Azzam	Canada
Casse couille		Philémon Antoine	Belgium
Cinq octobre		Élise Labelle	Canada
Esquisse		Namaï Kham Po	Canada
Maman fait dodo		Solenn Crozon	Belgium
Paradoxe		Aimé Majeau Beauchamp	Canada
La Prova		Toni Isabella Valenzi	Belgium

=== P'tits loups ===
Short film program of animation for children.

English title	Original title	Director(s)	Production country
Anscht		Matthias Huber	Switzerland
Autosaurus Rex		Marcel Barelli	Switzerland
Birth of the Oases	Naissance des oasis	Marion Jamault	France
The Boy and the Elephant	Le garçon et l'éléphant	Sonia Gerbeault	France
The Butterfly	Le Papillon	Lola Khattou	France
Émerveillement		Martin Clerget	France
Granny's Cookies	Les Biscuits de Mamy	Frits Standaert	France, Belgium
Guard of Honour		Edmunds Jansons	Latvia
Hello Stranger		Julia Ocker	Germany
Hush Hush Little Bear	Cuci cuci	Māra Liniņa	Latvia
Ice Merchants		João Gonzalez	Portugal, France, United Kingdom
La Kitouge		Emma Brun	France
Laika & Nemo		Jan Gadermann, Sebastian Gadow	Germany
Luce and the Rock	Luce et le rocher	Britt Raes	Belgium, France, Netherlands
Mora Mora		Jurga Šeduikytė	Lithuania
Mouse House	Mišja hiša	Timon Leder	Slovenia
My Tiger	Mon tigre	Jean-Jean Arnoux	France
No-No Goes to Space	Non-Non dans l'espace	Wassim Boutaleb Joutei	France, Belgium
Piropiro		Miyoung Baek	South Korea
The Queen of the Foxes	La Reine des renards	Marina Rosset	Switzerland
Slipping Away	L'air de rien	Gabriel Hénot Lefèvre	France
Tales of the Salt Water	Chroniques de l'eau salée	Tamerlan Bekmurzayev, Antoine Carre, Rodrigo Goulão de Sousa, Alexandra Petit, Martin Robic	France
The Tiger Who Came to Tea		Robin Shaw	United Kingdom
When I Am Sad	Quand je suis triste	Lilit Altunyan	Armenia, France

=== FNC Explore ===
Virtual reality projects.

English title	Original title	Director(s)	Production country
21–22 China		Thierry Loa	Canada
Biolum		Abel Kohen	France, Germany
Blood Relations		Analee Weinberger	Canada, Israel
Ceci n'est pas une cérémonie		Ahnahktsipiitaa	Canada
Clap		Keisuke Itoh	Japan
Diagnosia		Mengtai Zhang	United States
From the Main Square		Pedro Harres	Germany
Genesis		Faber Courtial	Germany
Laïka		Asif Kapadia	United Kingdom
Lockdown Dreamscape VR		Nicolas Gebbe	Germany
Montegelato		Davide Rapp	Italy
On the Morning You Wake		Pierre Zandrowicz, Mike Brett, Steve Jamison, Arnaud Colinart	France, United Kingdom
Plastisapiens		Miri Chekhanovich, Édith Jorisch	Canada, Israel

=== Estival ===
Film screenings that were held at an outdoor venue in August, several weeks before the regular festival program.

English title	Original title	Director(s)	Production country
Dune		Denis Villeneuve	United States
Hallelujah: Leonard Cohen, A Journey, A Song		Daniel Geller, Dayna Goldfine	United States, Canada
The Hand of God	È stata la mano di Dio	Paolo Sorrentino	Italy
Unfinished Infonie	L'Infonie inachevée...	Roger Frappier	Canada
