= International Film Festival of Ottawa =

Film festival

International Film Festival of Ottawa (IFFO)
- Location: Ottawa, Canada
- Founded: 2020
- Website: https://www.iffo.ca/

The International Film Festival of Ottawa (IFFO) is an international film festival, staged in Ottawa, Ontario, Canada, organized by the Canadian Film Institute that was to hold its inaugural edition from March 25 to March 29, 2020. The festival, launched as a replacement for the defunct Ottawa International Film Festival, was to present 20 feature films and 20 short films and to be held at the Ottawa Art Gallery and other venues in downtown Ottawa.

Due to the COVID-19 pandemic in Canada, the 2020 festival was not staged as planned; however, over the next several months the Canadian Film Institute organized and hosted a number of online talks and workshops under the Screen Summit banner. The festival was staged online in 2021, and launched its first in-person edition in March 2022.

The festival principally screens recent Canadian and international feature films, although each year's program also includes one or two historically or artistically significant films from the history of Canadian cinema. Most films screen along with a thematically related short film as an opener, although a few films screen alone and are instead followed by a talk with the filmmaker. The 2023 and 2024 editions of the festival both included a selection of early-cinema short films centred on women, under the "Cinema's First Nasty Women" banner.

== Films ==
=== 2021 ===
==== Feature films ====
English title	Original title	Director(s)	Production country	Year
Amanita Pestilens		René Bonnière	Canada	1963
Andrey Tarkovsky, A Cinema Prayer		Andrey A. Tarkovsky	Italy, Russia, Sweden	2019
Beans		Tracey Deer	Canada	2020
Coalesce	Les Affluents	Jessé Miceli	Cambodia, France	2020
Downstream to Kinshasa	En route pour le milliard	Dieudo Hamadi	Democratic Republic of the Congo, France, Belgium	2020
Golden Voices		Evgeny Ruman	Israel	2019
It Must Be Heaven		Elia Suleiman	France, Canada, Palestine, Turkey	2019
Last Days of Spring	La última primavera	Isabel Lamberti	Netherlands, Spain	2020
Little Ballerinas	Petites danseuses	Anne-Claire Dolivet	France	2020
Love Can't Wait	El Amor no puede esperar	Juan Carlos Carrasco	Mexico	2019
Mouthpiece		Patricia Rozema	Canada	2018
My Name Is Baghdad	Meu nome é Bagda	Caru Alves de Souza	Brazil	2020
No Ordinary Man		Chase Joynt, Aisling Chin-Yee	Canada	2020
Passage		Sarah Baril Gaudet	Canada	2020
The Seeds We Sow	Les graines que l'on sème	Nathan Nicholovitch	France	2020
Shiva Baby		Emma Seligman	Canada, United States	2020
A State of Madness	Mis 500 Locos	Leticia Tonos	Dominican Republic	2020
There Is No Evil	شیطان وجود ندارد	Mohammad Rasoulof	Iran	2020
Welcome to the USA		Assel Aushakimova	Kazakhstan	2019
Window Boy Would Also Like to Have a Submarine		Alex Piperno	Uruguay, Argentina, Brazil, Netherlands, Philippines	2020
You Will Die at Twenty	ستموت في العشرين	Amjad Abu Alala	Sudan	2019

==== Short films ====
English title	Original title	Director(s)	Production country	Year
Ain't No Time for Women	Y'a pas d'heure pour les femmes)	Sarra El Abed	Canada	2021
The Archivists		Igor Drljaca	Canada	2020
Beehives		Luca Fiore	Canada	2020
Body So Fluorescent		David Di Giovanni	Canada	2020
Brave Little Army		Michelle D'Alessandro Hatt	Canada	2020
Caribou in the Archive		Jennifer Dysart	Canada	2019
Delphine		Chloé Robichaud	Canada	2019
Every Day's Like This		Lev Lewis	Canada	2020
Expo Film (This Film Is My Memory)		Penny McCann	Canada	2019
Goodbye Papi		Jed Nabwangu	Canada	2021
Healing Bells	Sokinaa' Passkaan Aassisstoi	Taylor Crowspreadshiswings	Canada	2020
Hibiscus Season	La saison des hibiscus	Éléonore Goldberg	Canada	2020
Highway to Heaven		Sandra Ignagni	Canada	2019
Modern Whore		Nicole Bazuin	Canada	2020
Now Is the Time		Christopher Auchter	Canada	2019
Once the Dust Has Settled	Une fois la poussière retombée	Hervé Demers	Canada	2020
Point and Line to Plane		Sofia Bohdanowicz	Canada	2020
Regret		Santiago Menghini	Canada	2020
The Shape I Think		Nik Sheehan	Canada	1995
Shooting Star	Comme une comète	Ariane Louis-Seize	Canada	2020
Still Processing		Sophy Romvari	Canada	2020
Stump the Guesser		Guy Maddin, Evan Johnson, Galen Johnson	Canada	2020

=== 2022 ===
==== Feature films ====
English title	Original title	Director(s)	Production country	Year
Air Conditioner	Ar Condicionado	Fradique	Angola	2020
All My Puny Sorrows		Michael McGowan	Canada	2021
Aloners	Honja Saneun Salamdeul	Hong Sung-eun	South Korea	2021
Ballad of a White Cow	Ghasideyeh gave sefid	Behtash Sanaeeha, Maryam Moqadam	Iran	2020
Bipolar	只是一次偶然的旅行	Queena Li	China	2021
Bloody Oranges	Oranges sanguines	Jean-Christophe Meurisse	France	2021
Le Cercle Rouge		Jean-Pierre Melville	France	1972
Commitment Hasan	Bağlılık Hasan	Semih Kaplanoğlu	Turkey	2021
Dream Life	La vie rêvée	Mireille Dansereau	Canada	1972
Gagarine	Gagarin	Fanny Liatard, Jérémy Trouilh	France	2020
The Hill Where Lionesses Roar	La colline où rugissent les lionnes	Luàna Bajrami	France, Kosovo	2021
Kubrick by Kubrick		Gregory Monro	France	2020
Little Palestine, Diary of a Siege		Abdallah Al-Khatib	France	2021
Mariner of the Mountains	O marinheiro das montanhas	Karim Aïnouz	Brazil, France	2021
Marvelous and the Black Hole		Kate Tsang	United States	2021
Medusa		Anita Rocha da Silveira	Brazil	2021
Murina		Antoneta Alamat Kusijanović	Croatia	2021
Nouveau-Québec		Sarah Fortin	Canada	2021
Nudo Mixteco		Ángeles Cruz	Mexico	2021
Queendom		Marco Novoa, Simon Vivier	France	2021
The Replacement	El sustituto	Óscar Aibar	Spain	2021
Shortbus		John Cameron Mitchell	United States	2006
Silent Land	Cicha Ziemia	Aga Woszczyńska	Poland	2021
Social Hygiene	Hygiène sociale	Denis Côté	Canada	2021
Souad		Ayten Amin	Egypt	2021
The Twentieth Century		Matthew Rankin	Canada	2019
Under the Weather		William D. MacGillivray	Canada	2020
We're All in This Together		Katie Boland	Canada	2021
The Whaler Boy	Kitoboy	Philipp Yuryev	Russia, Poland, Belgium	2020
Wildhood		Bretten Hannam	Canada	2021
Yuni		Kamila Andini	Indonesia	2021

==== Short films ====
English title	Original title	Director(s)	Production country	Year
Acting Out		Jean-Sébastien Beaudoin Gagnon	Canada	2020
Amani		Alliah Fafin	Canada	2020
Bleach		Mattias Graham	Canada	2021
Bump		Maziyar Khatam	Canada	2022
Each Other	L'un l'autre	Clara Prévost	Canada	2021
Fanmi		Sandrine Brodeur-Desrosiers, Carmine Pierre-Dufour	Canada	2021
The First Goodbye		Ali Mashayekhi	Canada	2020
Flower Boy		Anya Chirkova	Canada	2021
Girls Shouldn't Walk Alone at Night	Les filles ne marchent pas seules la nuit	Katerine Martineau	Canada	2020
The Horses		Liz Cairns	Canada	2020
Like the Ones I Used to Know	Les Grands claques	Annie St-Pierre	Canada	2021
Little Bird		Tim Myles	Canada	2021
A Man and His Murals		Adam Bowman	Canada	2021
Nalujuk Night		Jennie Williams	Canada	2021
Personals		Sasha Argirov	Canada	2021
The Pond, at Night	L'Étang, la nuit	Olivia Boudreau	Canada	2020
Preacher		Mark Corless	Canada	2022
The Project		Tresor Lubamba	Canada	2021
Sledgehammer		Kyle Marchen	Canada	2021
The Southern Wind		Aucéane Roux	Canada	2021
Telos or Bust		Brad Abrahams	United States	2021
Together		Albert Shin	Canada, South Korea	2021
Untitled (Moiroloi)		Guillaume Saindon	Canada	2022
The Untouchable		Avazeh Shahnavaz	Canada	2021
A Void		Dominique van Olm	Canada	2021

=== 2023 ===
==== Feature films ====
English title	Original title	Director(s)	Production country	Year
Balaban		Aysulu Onaran	Kazakhstan	2022
Bones of Crows		Marie Clements	Canada	2022
Carajita		Silvina Schnicer, Ulises Porra Guardiola	Dominican Republic, Argentina	2021
The Christmas Setup		Pat Mills	Canada, United States	2020
The Code of Silence	Una Femmina: The Code of Silence	Francesco Costabile	Italy	2022
Coyote	Le Coyote	Katherine Jerkovic	Canada	2022
The Flag	Alam	Firas Khoury	Palestine	2022
Fogareu		Flávia Neves	Brazil, France	2022
I Like Movies		Chandler Levack	Canada	2022
Ice Under His Feet		Kirill Nenashev	Russia	2022
The Maiden		Graham Foy	Canada	2022
A Male	Un Varón	Fabian Hernández	Colombia	2022
Mandabi	Le Mandat	Ousmane Sembène	Senegal	1968
Marcel!		Jasmine Trinca	Italy	2022
Maya Nilo (Laura)		Lovisa Sirén	Sweden, Finland, Belgium	2022
Meditation Park		Mina Shum	Canada	2017
Ordinary Failures	Běžná selhání	Cristina Groşan	Czech Republic	2022
Phi 1.618		Theodore Ushev	Bulgaria, Canada	2022
Plan 75		Chie Hayakawa	Japan, Philippines, France, Qatar	2022
Queens of the Qing Dynasty		Ashley McKenzie	Canada	2022
R.M.N.		Cristian Mungiu	Romania, France, Belgium	2022
Return to Seoul	Retour à Seoul	Davy Chou	France, Germany, Belgium, Cambodia	2022
Rush to Judgment		Emile de Antonio	United States	1967
Shimoni		Angela Wanjiku Wamai	Kenya	2022
Soft		Joseph Amenta	Canada	2022
Sonne		Kurdwin Ayub	Austria	2022
Tales from the Gimli Hospital		Guy Maddin	Canada	1988
Under the Fig Trees	Taht alshajra	Erige Sehiri	Tunisia, France, Switzerland	2021
Until Tomorrow	Ta farda	Ali Asgari	Iran, France, Qatar	2022
Vicenta B.		Carlos Lechuga	Cuba, Colombia, France, Norway	2022
We Are Still Here		Beck Cole, Dena Curtis, Tracey Rigney, Danielle MacLean, Tim Worrall, Renae Maihi, Miki Magasiva, Mario Gaoa, Richard Curtis, Chantelle Burgoyne	Australia, New Zealand	2022
We Might As Well Be Dead	Wir könnten genauso gut tot sein	Natalia Sinelnikova	Germany, Romania	2022
We Will Never Belong	Nunca seremos parte	Amelia Eloisa	Mexico	2022
We Won't Kill Each Other with Guns	Nosotros no nos mataremos con pistolas	María Ripoll	Spain	2022
When Night Is Falling		Patricia Rozema	Canada	1995
The Worst Ones	Les Pires	Lise Akoka, Romane Gueret	France	2022

==== Short films ====
English title	Original title	Director(s)	Production country	Year
Adore		Beth Warrian	Canada	2022
Baba		Anya Chirkova, Meran Ismailsoy	Canada	2022
Blaze	Brasier	Émilie Mannering	Canada	2022
Brown Enough		Kent Donguines, Andrea Nirmala Widjajanto	Canada	2021
Corners		James Brylowski	Canada	2022
Desi Standard Time Travel		Kashif Pasta	Canada	2022
Everything Will Be Alright		Farhad Pakdel	Canada	2022
A Feller and the Tree		Kalainithan Kalaichelvan	Canada	2022
The Girl Spy Before Vicksburg		Sidney Olcott	United States	1910
Grown in Darkness		Devin Shears	Canada	2022
Irninnu Unikaara		Ipeelie Ootoova	Canada	2022
Likeness		Emily Diana Ruth	Canada	2019
Meeting with Robert Dole	Rencontre avec Robert Dole	François Harvey	Canada	2022
More Than Hair	Plus que des cheveux	Fitch Jean	Canada	2021
Most of the Time We Are Just Waiting		Molly Shears	Canada	2022
Municipal Relaxation Module		Matthew Rankin	Canada	2022
The Night Rider		Jay Hunt	United States	1920
No Ghost in the Morgue		Marilyn Cooke	Canada	2022
N'xaxaitkw		Asia Youngman	Canada	2022
Ori Mi Agbe		Ayunade Judah	Canada	2021
Paco		Kent Donguines	Canada	2022
The Passing		Jackson Harvey	Canada	2022
Pro Pool	Piscine pro	Alec Pronovost	Canada	2022
A Range Romance		[unknown]	United States	1911
The Red Girl and the Child		James Young Deer	United States	1910
Reply		Elle Mills	Canada	2022
Rocket Fuel		Jessie Posthumus	Canada	2022
Scaring Women at Night		Karimah Zakia Issa	Canada	2022
Shallots and Garlic	Bawang Merah dan Bawang Putih	Andrea Nirmala Widjajanto	Canada	2022
Simo		Aziz Zoromba	Canada	2022
So I Married Myself		Amen Jafri	Canada	2022
Song for the New World	Chanson pour le nouveau monde	Miryam Charles	Canada	2022
Spirit Emulsion		Siku Allooloo	Canada	2021
Tibi		Jarrett Twoyoungmen	Canada	2022
Waiting for Lolo	En attendant Lolo	Jules Ronfard	Canada	2022
What's the World Coming To?		Richard Wallace	United States	1926

=== 2024 ===
==== Feature films ====
English title	Original title	Director(s)	Production country	Year
Archangel		Guy Maddin	Canada	1990
Atikamekw Suns	Soleils Atikamekw	Chloé Leriche	Canada	2023
Chuck Chuck Baby		Janis Pugh	United Kingdom	2023
Close to You		Dominic Savage	Canada, United Kingdom	2023
Close Your Eyes	Cerrar los ojos	Victor Erice	Spain, Argentina	2023
Driving Mum	Á Ferð með Mömmu	Hilmar Oddsson	Iceland	2022
Elaha		Milena Aboyan	Germany	2023
Evil Does Not Exist	Aku wa Sonzai Shinai	Ryusuke Hamaguchi	Japan	2023
Funny Boy		Deepa Mehta	Canada	2020
The Gullspång Miracle		Maria Fredriksson	Sweden	2023
A Happy Day		Hisham Zaman	Norway, Denmark	2023
I Used to Be Funny		Ally Pankiw	Canada	2023
If Only I Could Hibernate	Baavgai Bolohson	Zoljargal Purevdash	Mongolia, France, Switzerland, Qatar	2023
Inshallah a Boy	Inshallah Walad	Amjad Al Rasheed	Jordan, France	2023
Kidnapped	Rapito	Marco Bellocchio	Italy	2023
Lazaro's Daughter	La Hija de Lázaro	Gustavo Fallas	Costa Rica	2023
Let the Dance Begin	Empieza el baile	Marina Seresesky	Argentina, Spain	2023
Loch Ness: They Created a Monster		John MacLaverty	United Kingdom	2023
Seven Veils		Atom Egoyan	Canada	2023
Seven Winters in Tehran		Steffi Niederzoll	Germany, France	2023
Sira		Apolline Traoré	Burkina Faso, France, Germany, Senegal	2023
Sisterhood		Nora El Hourch	France	2023
Solo		Sophie Dupuis	Canada	2023
Tiger Stripes		Amanda Nell Eu	Malaysia	2023
The Wars		Robin Phillips	Canada	1983

==== Short films ====
English title	Original title	Director(s)	Production country	Year
6 minutes/km		Catherine Boivin	Canada	2023
All the Days of May	Tous les jours de mai	Miryam Charles	Canada	2023
The Anger of Mrs. Plumette	La fureur de Mme Plumette	[unknown]	France	1912
Betty's Boat	Le bateau de Léontine	Romeo Bosetti	France	1911
Betty's Flight	Léontine s'envole	Romeo Bosetti	France	1911
Blond Night	Nuit blonde	Gabrielle Demers	Canada	2023
The Company We Keep		Wojtek Jakubiec	Canada	2023
Cunégonde the Nasty Woman	Cunégonde femme crampon	[unknown]	France	1912
Dead Cat	Chat mort	Annie-Claude Caron, Danick Audet	Canada	2022
Donna		Keenan MacWilliam	Canada	2023
Dream Tricks: Over a Six Stair		Adam Seward	Canada	2022
Emak Bakia		Man Ray	France	1926
L'Étoile de mer		Man Ray	France	1928
Execution Triptych		Giran Findlay Liu	Canada	2022
Father Archie		Todd Fraser	Canada	2023
The Flower Darkens	À la fontaine	Philippe Berthelet	Canada	2023
Have a Good Day		Lisa Soper	Canada	2024
Heat Spell	L'Été des chaleurs	Marie-Pier Dupuis	Canada	2023
Katshinau	Les Mains sales	Julien G. Marcotte, Jani Bellefleur-Kaltush	Canada	2023
Laughing Gas		Edwin S. Porter	United States	1907
The Legend of Ismael LBG		Connor DeVries	Canada	2023
Léontine Keeps House	Léontine garde la maison	Romeo Bosetti	France	1912
Mary Jane's Mishap		George Albert Smith	United Kingdom	1903
The Mess We're In		Jamie Lam	Canada	2022
Motherland		Jasmin Mozaffari	Canada	2023
Les Mystères du Château du Dé		Man Ray	France	1929
Our Grandmother the Inlet		Jaime Leigh Gianopoulos, Kayah George	Canada	2023
A Passage Beyond Fortune		Weiye Su	Canada	2022
Quiche		Suzannah Moore	Canada	2022
Le Retour à la raison		Man Ray	France	1923
Rosalie and Her Phonograph	Rosalie et son phonographe	Romeo Bosetti	France	1911
Rosalie Moves In	Rosalie emménage	Romeo Bosetti	France	1911
Rowdy Ann		Al Christie	United States	1919
Scissors	Les Ciseaux	Katia Kurtness	Canada	2022
The Tadpole Trilogy	La trilogie des têtards	Léonard Giovenazzo	Canada	2023
Tilly's Party		Lewin Fitzhamon	United Kingdom	1911
We Would Be Freer		Rana Nazzal Hamadeh	Canada	2023

=== 2025 ===
==== Feature films ====
English title	Original title	Director(s)	Production country	Year
All Shall Be Well	從今以後	Ray Yeung	Hong Kong	2024
Arzé	أرزة	Mira Shaib	Lebanon	2024
Boomerang		Shahab Fotouhi	Iran	2024
Brother		Clement Virgo	Canada	2022
Can I Get a Witness?		Ann Marie Fleming	Canada	2024
Ciao Bambino		Edgardo Pistone	Italy	2024
Gondola		Veit Helmer	Germany, Georgia	2023
Grand Tour		Miguel Gomes	Portugal, Italy, France, Germany	2024
Honeymoon	Medovyi misiats	Zhanna Ozirna	Ukraine	2024
The Legend of the Vagabond Queen of Lagos		The Agbajowo Collective	Nigeria, Germany, South Africa, United States	2024
Memories of a Burning Body	Memorias de un cuerpo que arde	Antonella Sudasassi Furniss	Costa Rica, Spain	2024
The Missile	Ohjus	Miia Tervo	Finland	2024
Neon Dreaming	Rêver en néon	Marie-Claire Marcotte	Canada	2024
The Penguin Lessons		Peter Cattaneo	United Kingdom	2024
So Surreal: Behind the Masks		Neil Diamond, Joanne Robertson	Canada	2024
Souleymane's Story	L'Histoire de Souleymane	Boris Lojkine	France	2024
They Will Be Dust	Polvo serán	Carlos Marqués-Marcet	Spain, Switzerland, Italy	2024
To a Land Unknown		Mahdi Fleifel	Palestine, United Kingdom, Ireland, France, Germany, Greece, Qatar, Saudi Arabia	2024
Toxic	Akiplėša	Saulė Bliuvaitė	Lithuania	2024
Village Keeper		Karen Chapman	Canada	2024
Wet Monday	Lany Poniedziałek	Justyna Mytnik	Poland, Estonia, Czech Republic	2024
Who Do I Belong To	Mé el Aïn	Meryam Joobeur	Canada, Tunisia	2024
Wild Diamond	Diamant brut	Agathe Riedinger	France	2024
Winter Kept Us Warm		David Secter	Canada	1965
Young Hearts	Junge Herzen	Anthony Schatteman	Belgium, Netherlands	2024

==== Short films ====
English title	Original title	Director(s)	Production country	Year
Are You Scared to Be Yourself Because You Think That You Might Fail?		Bec Pecaut	Canada	2024
Before They Joined Us		Arshile Khanjian Egoyan	Canada	2024
Bridge the Gap		Luca Fiore	Canada	2024
Buses Don't Stop Here Anymore		Penny McCann	Canada	2024
Gender Reveal		Mo Matton	Canada	2024
Greenhorn		Sabrina Way	Canada	2024
Here and There	D'ici, d'ailleurs	Chadi Bennani	Canada	2024
Himalia		Clara Milo, Juliette Lossky	Canada	2024
Like a Spiral	Comme une spirale	Lamia Chraibi	Canada	2024
Nightmare Café	Café des cauchemars	Frida Symons-Swann, Nyah Clarke	Canada	2024
On a Sunday at Eleven		Alicia K. Harris	Canada	2024
One Day		Yazmeen Kanji	Canada	2024
One Day This Kid		Alexander Farah	Canada	2024
perfectly a strangeness		Alison McAlpine	Canada	2024
The Sound of You Collapsing		Rylan Friday	Canada	2024
The Steak		Kiarash Dadgar	Canada	2024
The Sweater		Maziyar Khatam	Canada	2024
Two of Hearts		Mashie Alam	Canada	2024
Uasheshkun		Normand Junior Thirnish-Pilot	Canada	2024
welima'q		shalan joudry	Canada	2024
Who Loves the Sun		Arshia Shakiba	Canada	2024
Zoé		Rémi St-Michel	Canada	2024

=== 2026 ===
==== Feature films ====
English title	Original title	Director(s)	Production country	Year
Bayaan		Bikas Mishra	India	2025
Careful		Guy Maddin	Canada	1992
Cotton Queen		Suzannah Mirghani	Sudan, Germany, France, Palestine, Egypt, Qatar, Saudi Arabia	2025
Erupcja		Pete Ohs	Poland, United States	2025
The Eyes of Ghana		Ben Proudfoot	United States	2025
Forastera		Lucía Aleñar Iglesias	Spain, Sweden, Italy	2025
I Lost Sight of the Landscape	J'ai perdu de vue le paysage	Sophie Bédard Marcotte	Canada	2025
Jimpa		Sophie Hyde	Australia, Finland, Netherlands	2025
Kika		Alexe Poukine	Belgium, France	2025
Levers		Rhayne Vermette	Canada	2025
Little Trouble Girls	Kaj ti je deklica	Urška Djukić	Slovenia, Italy, Croatia, Serbia	2025
Love Letters	Des preuves d'amour	Alice Douard	France	2025
Mārama		Taratoa Stappard	New Zealand	2025
Memory of Princess Mumbi		Damien Hauser	Kenya, Switzerland, Saudi Arabia	2025
Meteors	Météors	Hubert Charuel	France	2025
Mile End Kicks		Chandler Levack	Canada	2025
Montreal, My Beautiful	Montréal, ma belle	Xiaodan He	Canada	2025
My Salinger Year		Philippe Falardeau	Canada	2020
Nakdong River		Chang-geun Jeon	Korea	1952
Point of Order		Emile de Antonio	United States	1963
Primavera		Damiano Michieletto	Italy, France	2025
A Sad and Beautiful World		Cyril Aris	Lebanon, United States, Germany, Saudi Arabia, Qatar	2025
Silent Friend	Stiller Freund	Ildikó Enyedi	Germany, France, Hungary	2025
The Track		Ryan Sidhoo	Canada	2025
Twelve Moons	Doce Lunas	Victoria Franco	Mexico	2025
A Useful Ghost	Phi Chaidai Kha	Ratchapoom Boonbunchachoke	Thailand	2025
We Are Pat		Rowan Haber	United States	2025
What Now?	Et maintenant?	Jocelyn Forgues	Canada	2025
Where the Wind Comes From		Amel Guellaty	Tunisia, France, Qatara	2025
Where to Land		Hal Hartley	United States	2025

==== Short films ====
English title	Original title	Director(s)	Production country	Year
16mm		Francis Théberge	Canada	2025
L'Atelier Martineau		Connor DeVries	Canada	2025
Boa		Alexandre Dostie	Canada	2025
Dome		Mave Ky	Canada	2025
Fan		Philippe Berthelet	Canada	2025
In Lieu of Flowers		Jessie Posthumus	Canada	2025
Jazz Infernal		Will Niava	Canada	2025
Klee		Gavin Baird	Canada	2025
The Little Goodbyes	Les faux sapins	Justine Martin	Canada	2025
Living Grounds	Sol vivant	Émile Lavoie	Canada	2025
Mercenaire		Pier-Philippe Chevigny	Canada	2025
Muses		Simon Vermeulen	Canada	2024
Nancy		Lynda Hall	Canada	2025
Notes from a Poet		Simon Garez	Canada	2025
The Pavilion		Pixie Cram	Canada	2025
The Punk of Natashquan	Le Punk de Natashquan	Nicolas Lachapelle	Canada	2025
Ramón Who Speaks to Ghosts		Shervin Kermani	Canada	2025
ripe	chín	Solara Thanh Bình Đặng	Canada	2025
Same Time Next Year		Anushay Sheikh	Canada	2025
Sea Star		Tyler Mckenzie Evans	Canada	2025
A Soft Touch		Heather Young	Canada	2025
Tuktuit: Caribou		Lindsay McIntyre	Canada	2025
