= Rosalie Chicoine Perreault =

Canadian film producer

Rosalie Chicoine Perreault is a Canadian film producer from Quebec, associated with the Metafilms studio.

== Filmography ==
- Jeez - 2017, line producer
- Geographies of Solitude - 2022, producer
- Simo - 2022, producer
- III - 2022, producer
- Yanni - 2022, producer
- Joli Jour - 2022, producer
- Okurimono - 2024, producer
- Someone's Trying to Get In - 2024, producer
- Universal Language - 2024, line producer
- Himalia - 2024, producer
- A Wolf in the Suburbs - 2026, producer
- Closing Night - 2026, producer

== Awards ==
Award	Date of ceremony	Category	Recipient(s)	Result	Ref.
Canadian Screen Awards	2023	Best Live Action Short Drama	Simo with Aziz Zoromba	Won	
Canadian Screen Awards	2023	Best Live Action Short Drama	III with Salomé Villeneuve, Catherine Boily	Nominated	
Canadian Screen Awards	2026	Best Live Action Short Drama	Himalia with Catherine Boily, Clara Milo, Juliette Lossky	Nominated	
Canadian Screen Awards	2025	Best Feature Length Documentary	Okurimono with Laurence Lévesque, Catherine Boily	Nominated	
Prix Iris	2023	Prix Iris for Best Documentary Film	Geographies of Solitude with Jacquelyn Mills	Nominated	
Prix Iris	2023	Best Live Action Short Film	Simo with Aziz Zoromba	Nominated	
