= Catherine Boily =

Canadian film producer

Catherine Boily is a Canadian film producer from Quebec, associated with the Metafilms studio.

== Filmography ==
- True Piracy - 2013, associate producer
- Shambles (Maudite poutine) - 2016, production intern
- Pisces - 2017, co-producer
- Shirley Temple - 2018, associate producer
- Que votre empire s'étende - 2019, associate producer
- Back to Rock - 2020, producer
- F*ckin' Coffin! (Cercueil, tabarnak!) - 2021, associate producer
- The Card Counter - 2021, executive producer
- III - 2022, producer
- Yanni - 2022, producer
- Joli Jour - 2022, producer
- Okurimono - 2024, producer
- Universal Language - 2024, line producer
- Himalia - 2024, producer
- Rosebush Pruning - 2025, executive producer

== Awards ==
Award	Date of ceremony	Category	Recipient(s)	Result	Ref.
Canadian Screen Awards	2023	Best Live Action Short Drama	III with Salomé Villeneuve, Rosalie Chicoine Perreault	Nominated	
Canadian Screen Awards	2025	Best Feature Length Documentary	Okurimono with Laurence Lévesque, Rosalie Chicoine Perreault	Nominated	
Canadian Screen Awards	2026	Best Live Action Short Drama	Himalia with Rosalie Chicoine Perreault, Clara Milo, Juliette Lossky	Nominated	
