= 2012/Through the Heart =

- French: 2012/Dans le cœur
- Directed by: Rodrigue Jean; Arnaud Valade
- Written by: Rodrigue Jean; Arnaud Valade
- Produced by: Rodrigue Jean
- Edited by: Arnaud Valade
- Music by: Jacob Desjardins
- Production company: Transmar Films
- Distributed by: Productions Multi-Monde
- Release date: October 2022 (FNC)
- Running time: 76 minutes
- Country: Canada
- Language: French

2012/Through the Heart (French: 2012/Dans le cœur) is a Canadian documentary film, directed by Rodrigue Jean and Arnaud Valade and released in 2022. Compiled from original footage of the events, the film profiles the 2012 Quebec student protests.

The film premiered at the 2022 Festival du nouveau cinéma, before going into commercial release in 2023.

== Awards ==
At the FNC, it was named the winner of the audience-voted Public Prize in the Temps 0 program.

The film received an honorable mention from the Colin Low Award jury at the 2023 DOXA Documentary Film Festival.
