= Under the Weather (2020 film) =

- Directed by: William D. MacGillivray
- Written by: William D. MacGillivray
- Produced by: Terry Greenlaw; Christopher Richardson
- Starring: Stephen Oates; Ruth Lawrence; Des Walsh; Julia Sarah Stone
- Cinematography: Kent Nason
- Edited by: William D. MacGillivray; Justin Oakey
- Music by: David Findlay
- Production companies: Picture Plant; Cranky Goat Entertainment
- Release date: September 19, 2020 (AFF)
- Running time: 118 minutes
- Country: Canada
- Language: English

Under the Weather is a 2020 Canadian drama film, directed by William D. MacGillivray. The film stars Stephen Oates as Joe, a man dying of cancer, who returns home to Newfoundland and Labrador to reconnect with and be taken care of by his family.

The film's cast also includes Ruth Lawrence as Joe's sister Jenny, Des Walsh as Jenny's husband Phil, and Julia Sarah Stone as Phil and Jenny's daughter Maggie, as well as Tom Dunne, Colin Harris, Paula Morgan, Sabrina Roberts, Bridget Wareham and Paul Ewan Wilson in supporting roles.

The film premiered at the 2020 FIN Atlantic Film Festival, although due to the COVID-19 pandemic it was streamed exclusively online. It had its first in-person theatrical screening at the 2022 International Film Festival of Ottawa.

It was a nominee for Best Picture at the 2021 Screen Nova Scotia awards.
