= Before I Change My Mind =

2022 film by Trevor Anderson

- Theatrical release poster
- Directed by: Trevor Anderson
- Written by: Trevor Anderson; Fish Griwkowsky
- Produced by: Katrina Beatty; Alyson Richards
- Starring: Vaughan Murrae; Dominic Lippa; Lacey Oake; Matthew Rankin; Shannon Blanchet
- Cinematography: Wesley R. Miron
- Edited by: Justin Lachance
- Music by: Lyle Bell
- Production companies: Loud Whisper Productions; Outside Line Studio
- Distributed by: Epic Pictures
- Release dates: August 10, 2022 (Locarno); April 19, 2024 (Canada)
- Running time: 89 minutes
- Country: Canada
- Language: English

Before I Change My Mind is a 2022 Canadian coming-of-age comedy-drama film co-written and directed by Trevor Anderson in his feature directorial debut. Set in 1987, the film stars Vaughan Murrae as Robin, a non-binary teenager who moves with their father to a small town in Alberta, where they navigate the challenges of fitting into a new environment by befriending Carter (Dominic Lippa), the school bully. The film also stars Lacey Oake, Matthew Rankin, and Shannon Blanchet.

The film premiered at the 75th Locarno Film Festival on August 10, 2022, and had its Canadian premiere at the 2022 FIN Atlantic Film Festival in September. It was released in the United States by Epic Pictures in select theaters on March 1, 2024, and on digital platforms on March 5. It was released theatrically in Canada on April 19, 2024.

== Cast ==
- Vaughan Murrae as Robin
- Dominic Lippa as Carter
- Lacey Oake as Izzy
- Matthew Rankin as Daniel
- Shannon Blanchet as Annie
- Rohan Khare as Shev
- Jhztyn Contado as Tony
- Milana Bochinska as Jenn
- Kaitlyn Haugen as Natalie
- Kristin Johnston as Ms. Pahornyk
- Trevor Anderson as Mr. Anderson
- Etta George House as Big Carter
- Andrea House as Mrs. Lee
- Heather Noel as Jackie
- Ethan Nasr as Jesus
- Joshua Carter as Madonna
- Onika Henry as Trish
- Desiree Burkett as Linda

== Production ==
The film, Anderson's feature debut following a number of short films, was supported in advance of production by both the Inside Out Film and Video Festival's Financing Forum and GLAAD's 2020 list of LGBTQ-centred screenplays in development. It was shot in and around Red Deer, Alberta, in 2021.

== Reception ==
=== Critical response ===
On the review aggregator website Rotten Tomatoes, the film holds an approval rating of 100% based on 8 reviews, with an average rating of 7.2/10.

IndieWire highlighted the film as one of ten must-see films at Locarno, writing that it was "convincingly draped in a soft and transportive '80s aesthetic" and that it "seems determined to confront the challenges and triumphs of self-becoming with the unwavering honesty of someone who remembers them both".

For Screen Anarchy, Martin Kudlac wrote that the film effectively subverted and refreshed many of the tropes and clichés of the teen coming-of-age genre.

=== Accolades ===
At the Calgary International Film Festival, the film was named as one of the ten advance finalists for the festival's RBC Emerging Canadian Artist competition. At the 2022 Festival du nouveau cinéma, it received an honorable mention from the National Competition jury.

The film was longlisted for the Directors Guild of Canada's 2022 Jean-Marc Vallée DGC Discovery Award.

Vaughan Murrae was awarded the Critics Award Boccalino d'Oro (Golden Jug) at the 75th Locarno Film Festival.

Lacey Oake won the award for Best Performance in a Female Role at the 2022 Iris Prize.

The film won three Rosie Awards at the 2022 Alberta Film and Television Awards, for Best Feature Film, Best Screenplay for a Feature Film (Anderson, Griwkowsky) and Best Cinematography in a Feature Film (Wes Miron).
