= Keeley Karsten =

American actress

Keeley Karsten is an American actress.

== Biography ==
A native of New York City, Karsten rose to prominence when she was cast in the Steven Spielberg film The Fabelmans (2022). In March 2025, Karsten was cast in Malcolm in the Middle: Life's Still Unfair (2026), a miniseries revival of the comedy series Malcolm in the Middle (2000–2006). Karsten portrayed the titular character's daughter Leah. Karsten will next appear in the Apple TV miniseries The Savant.

Outside of acting, Karsten is an advocate for mental health, and serves as an ambassador for Lady Gaga's Born This Way Foundation.

== Filmography ==
=== Film ===
Year	Title	Role	Notes
2022	The Fabelmans	Natalie Fabelman	
2024	Adult Best Friends	Young Delaney	

=== Television ===
Year	Title	Role	Notes
2019	Evil Lives Here	Child Pam Sinclair	1 episode
2020	Hunters	Convent Girl #1	1 episode
2026	Malcolm in the Middle: Life's Still Unfair	Leah	Miniseries, 4 episodes
2027	The Savant	Reg	Upcoming miniseries
