= Denis Villeneuve =

Canadian filmmaker (born 1967)

Denis Villeneuve OC CQ RCA OAL
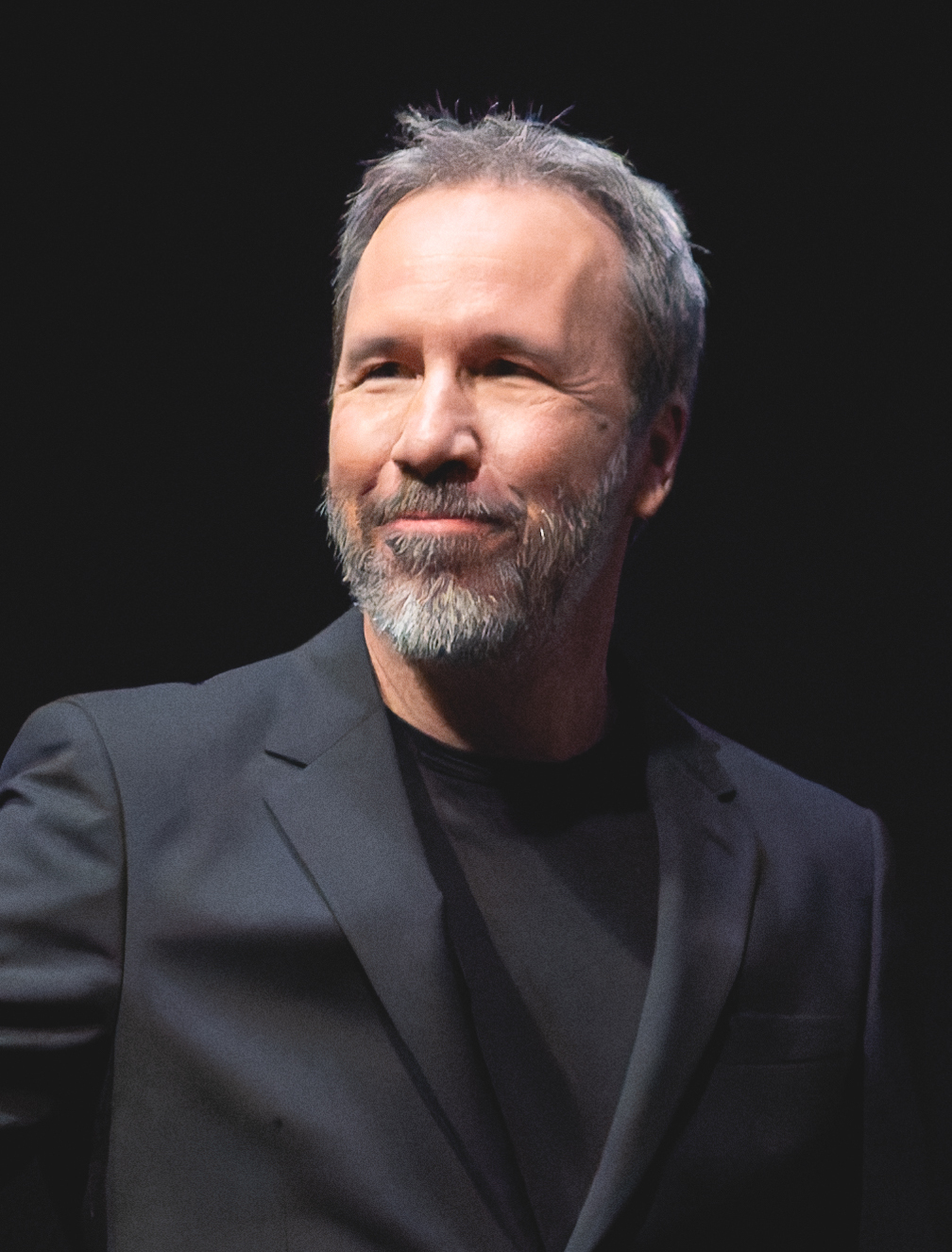
- Denis Villeneuve at the Royal Festival Hall in October 2024
- Born: October 3, 1967 (age 59); Gentilly, Quebec, Canada
- Education: Université du Québec à Montréal
- Occupations: Film director; screenwriter
- Years active: 1990–present
- Spouse: Tanya Lapointe
- Children: 3, including Salomé Villeneuve
- Relatives: Martin Villeneuve (brother); Claude Villeneuve (brother)

Denis Villeneuve (French: [dəni vilnœv]; born October 3, 1967) is a Canadian film director and screenwriter. He has won seven Canadian Screen Awards as well as nominations for four Academy Awards, five BAFTA Awards, and two Golden Globe Awards. Villeneuve's films have grossed more than $1.8 billion worldwide.

Villeneuve began his filmmaking career in Quebec cinema, directing four French-language dramas: August 32nd on Earth (1998), Maelström (2000), Polytechnique (2009), and Incendies (2010), with the latter garnering him international prominence and an Academy Award for Best International Feature Film nomination. He subsequently expanded into English-language films, directing the thrillers Prisoners (2013), Enemy (2013), and Sicario (2015). Like Incendies, each of these was critically acclaimed.

Villeneuve has since gained further recognition for directing science fiction films. His work on Arrival (2016) earned him an Academy Award for Best Director nomination. This was followed by Blade Runner 2049 (2017), which was also critically lauded. His next projects were Dune (2021) and Dune: Part Two (2024), a two-part adaptation of Frank Herbert's novel of the same name that grossed a combined $1.15 billion globally. Both films were critically and commercially successful, earning him two nominations for the Academy Award for Best Picture in addition to a nomination for Best Adapted Screenplay for Dune. A third installment, Dune: Part Three, based on Herbert's 1969 novel Dune Messiah, is forthcoming.

== Early life and education ==
Villeneuve was born on October 3, 1967, in the village of Gentilly in Bécancour, Quebec, to Nicole Demers, a homemaker, and Jean Villeneuve, a notary. He is the eldest of four siblings. His younger brother, Martin, also became a filmmaker. He was already passionate about cinema by adolescence. He started writing screenplays and making short films in secondary school.

Villeneuve attended the Séminaire Saint-Joseph de Trois-Rivières and later studied science at the Cégep de Trois-Rivières. He studied cinema at the Université du Québec à Montréal. After becoming established as a filmmaker, Villeneuve received an honorary Doctorate in Fine Arts from Concordia University in Montreal on June 6, 2024.

== Career ==
=== 1991–2012: Canadian films ===
Villeneuve began his career making short films and won Radio-Canada's youth film competition, La Course Europe-Asie, in 1991. August 32nd on Earth (1998), Villeneuve's feature film directorial debut, premiered in the Un Certain Regard section at the 1998 Cannes Film Festival. Alexis Martin won the Prix Jutra for Best Actor. The film was selected as the Canadian entry for the Best Foreign Language Film at the 71st Academy Awards, but it was not nominated.

His second film, Maelström (2000), attracted further attention and screened at festivals worldwide, ultimately winning eight Jutra Awards and the award for Best Canadian Film from the Toronto International Film Festival. After taking a pause in filmmaking to "recenter his life", Villeneuve returned to cinema with the controversial but critically acclaimed black and white film Polytechnique (2009) about the shootings that occurred at the University of Montreal in 1989. Polytechnique premiered at the Cannes Film Festival and received numerous honours, including nine Genie Awards, becoming Villeneuve's first film to win the Genie (now known as a Canadian Screen Award) for Best Motion Picture.

Villeneuve's fourth film Incendies (2010) garnered critical acclaim when it premiered at the Venice and Toronto International Film Festivals. Incendies was subsequently chosen to represent Canada at the 83rd Academy Awards in the category of Best Foreign Language Film, and was eventually nominated for the award, though it did not win. The film went on to win eight awards at the 31st Genie Awards, including Best Motion Picture, Best Direction, Best Actress (Lubna Azabal), Best Adapted Screenplay, Cinematography, Editing, Overall Sound, and Sound Editing. Incendies was chosen by The New York Times as one of the top 10 best films of that year. In January 2011, he was selected by Variety as one of the top ten filmmakers to watch. Later that year, Villeneuve won the National Arts Centre Award.

=== 2013–2016: Transition to Hollywood ===
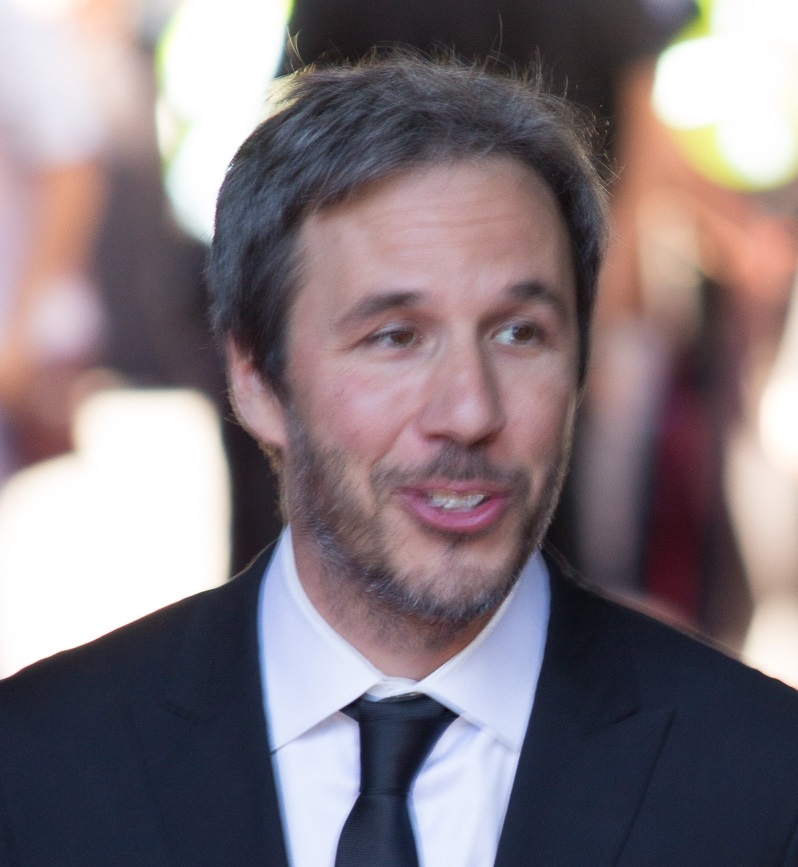
Villeneuve at the 2013 Toronto International Film Festival

Villeneuve followed Incendies with the crime thriller Prisoners (2013), starring Hugh Jackman and Jake Gyllenhaal. The film screened at festivals across the globe, won several awards, and was nominated for the Academy Award for Best Cinematography in 2014. Following Incendies and Prisoners, Villeneuve won Best Director for his sixth film, the psychological thriller Enemy (2013), at the 2nd Canadian Screen Awards. The film was awarded the $100,000 cash prize for best Canadian film of the year by the Toronto Film Critics Association in 2015.

Later that year, Villeneuve directed the crime thriller film Sicario, scripted by Taylor Sheridan, and starring Emily Blunt, Benicio del Toro, Daniel Kaluuya, and Josh Brolin. The film competed for the Palme d'Or at the 2015 Cannes Film Festival, though it did not win. It later screened at the Toronto International Film Festival in 2015 and went on to gross nearly $80 million worldwide at the box office.

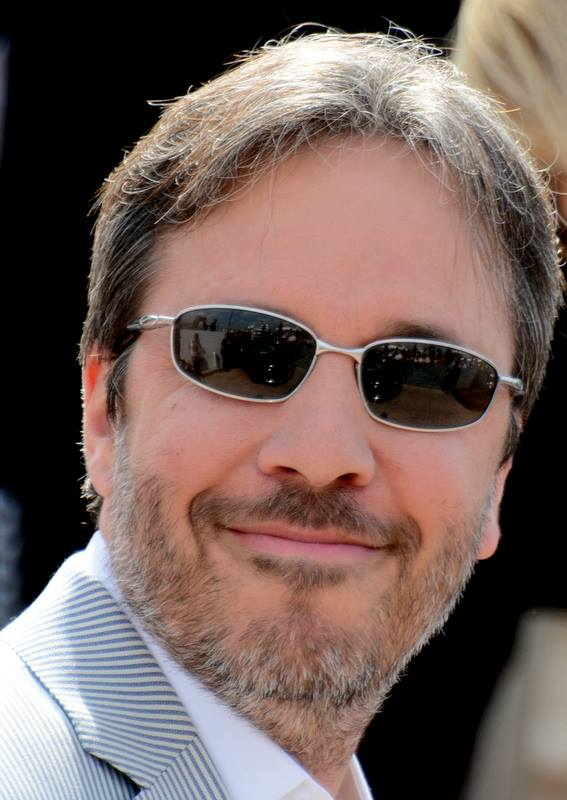
Villeneuve at the 2015 Cannes Film Festival

Villeneuve subsequently directed his eighth film, Arrival (2016), based on the short story Story of Your Life by author Ted Chiang, from an adapted script by Eric Heisserer, with Amy Adams and Jeremy Renner starring. Principal photography began on June 7, 2015, in Montreal, and the film was released in 2016. Arrival grossed $203 million worldwide and received critical acclaim, specifically for Adams's performance, Villeneuve's direction, and the film's exploration of communicating with extraterrestrial intelligence. Arrival appeared on numerous critics' best films of the year lists, and was selected by the American Film Institute as one of ten films of the year. It received eight nominations at the 89th Academy Awards, including Best Picture, Best Director, and Best Adapted Screenplay, ultimately winning one award for Best Sound Editing. It was also awarded the Ray Bradbury Award for Outstanding Dramatic Presentation and the Hugo Award for Best Dramatic Presentation in 2017.

=== 2017–present: Critical and commercial acclaim ===
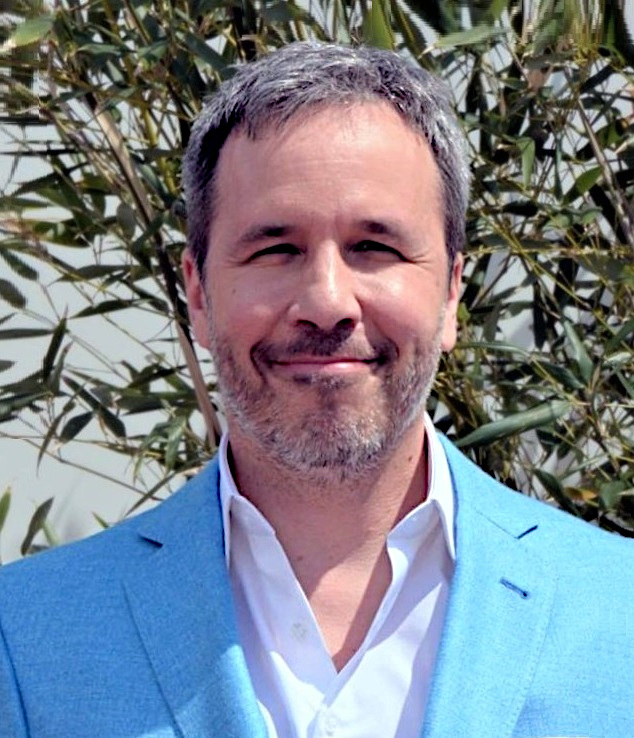
Villeneuve at 2018 Cannes Film Festival

In February 2015, it was announced that Villeneuve would direct Blade Runner 2049, the sequel to Ridley Scott's Blade Runner (1982). Scott served as the film's executive producer on behalf of Warner Bros. Pictures. It was released on October 6, 2017, to critical acclaim but it underperformed at the box office. David Ehrlich of IndieWire wrote, "Few filmmakers of the 21st century have risen to prominence and prestige with the forcefulness of Blade Runner 2049 director Denis Villeneuve, whose seemingly unstoppable career has been bolstered by a steady balance of critical respect and commercial success. In fact, Christopher Nolan is the only other person who comes to mind, and the similarities between the two of them are hard to ignore."

In December 2016, it was announced Villeneuve would direct Dune, a new adaptation of the 1965 novel for Legendary Pictures with Villeneuve, Eric Roth, and Jon Spaihts writing the screenplay. Timothée Chalamet (Paul Atreides), Rebecca Ferguson (Lady Jessica), Oscar Isaac ( Duke Leto Atreides), Stellan Skarsgård (Baron Vladimir Harkonnen), Jason Momoa (Duncan Idaho), and Zendaya (Chani) starred in the film. The film was released roughly five years later on October 22, 2021, by Warner Bros. Pictures to critical acclaim. The sequel, Dune: Part Two, was green-lit after the success of the first film, and it was released in March 2024 to widespread critical acclaim. It also became Villeneuve's highest-grossing film to date and became the seventh highest-grossing film of 2024. In December 2024, Villeneuve won the Prix Iris Tribute Award at the 26th Quebec Cinema Awards.

Dune: Part One (2021) won six Academy Awards at the 2022 Oscars. These included: Best Cinematography, Best Film Editing, Best Original Score (Hans Zimmer), Best Production Design, Best Sound and Best Visual Effects. Alongside this the film also won five BAFTA Awards, including cinematography, special visual effects, sound, original score and production design and one Golden Globe for Best Original Score.

Dune: Part Two (2024) won two Academy Awards at the 2025 Oscars, these included Best Sound and Best Visual Effects. Alongside this, it won two BAFTA Awards for Sound and Special Visual Effects.

Dune: Part Three, billed as Villeneuve's third and final Dune film, and based on the 1969 novel Dune Messiah, began production in July 2025. The film is scheduled to be released in the United States on December 18, 2026, in IMAX. Due to the high demand for 70mm IMAX screening tickets, there have been waves of pre-sale tickets all around the UK in order for audiences to secure early seats. On December 18, 2026, both Dune: Part Three and Avengers: Doomsday release in theatres, sparking nostalgia from summer 2023 with the dual release of Barbie and Oppenheimer.

Villeneuve served as a producer for all three Dune films, which producer Mary Parent said "...as big and as epic as this film is, there were many times where it almost felt like you were on the set of an independent film," and that "...he's very very smart about where to spend money."

=== Planned projects ===
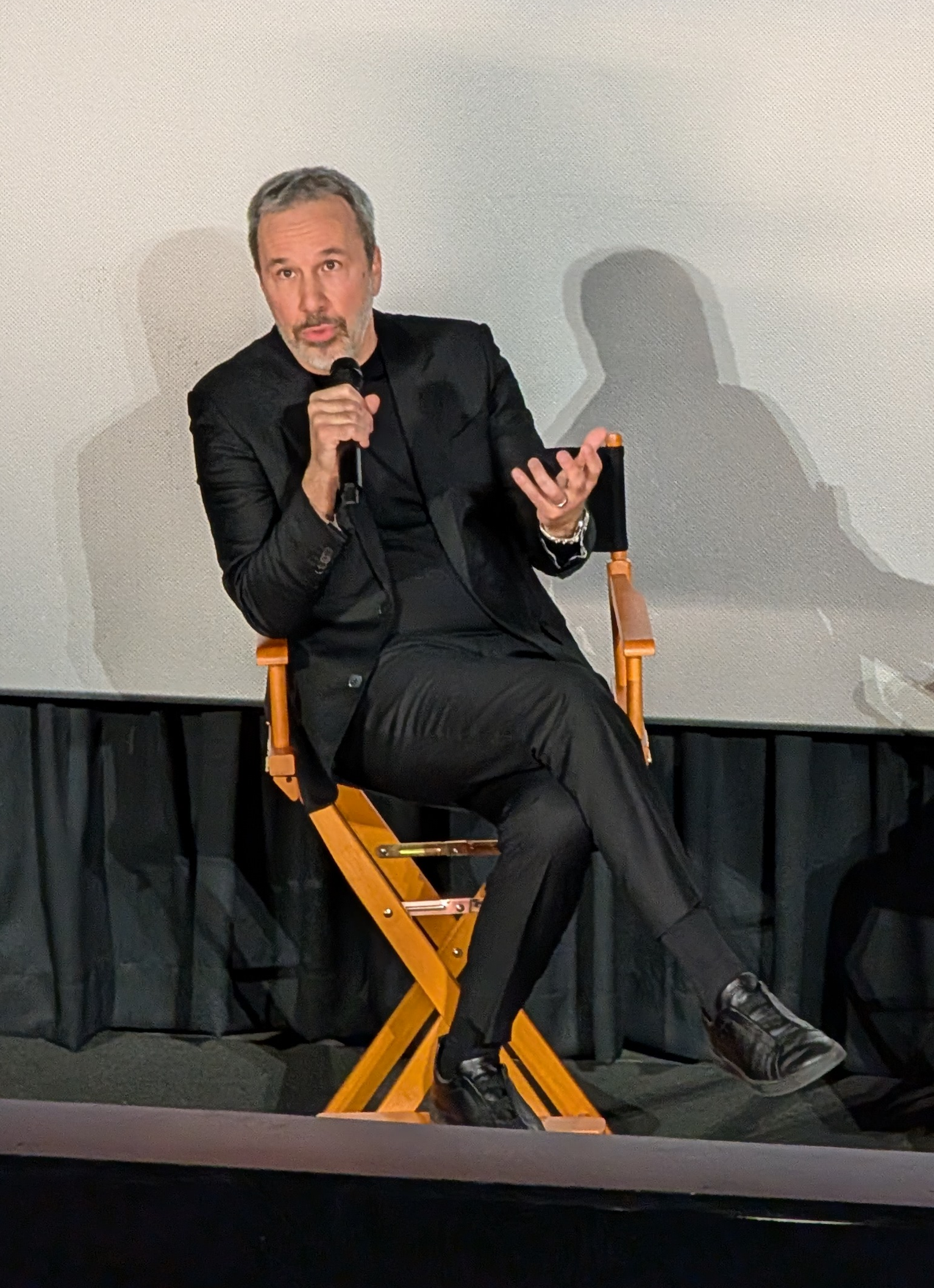
Villeneuve in Los Angeles, 2026

Villeneuve is attached to direct a historical drama about Cleopatra for Sony Pictures (based on the biography by Stacy Schiff) and an adaptation of Arthur C. Clarke's science fiction novel Rendezvous with Rama for Alcon Entertainment. He has also confirmed a secret project is in the works, on which he said, "...I cannot talk about right now, but that needs to see the light of day quite quickly. So it would be a good idea to do something in between projects, before tackling Dune Messiah and Cleopatra. All these projects are still being written, so we'll see where they go, but I have no control over that."

In April 2024, it was reported that Villeneuve was in talks to potentially reunite with Legendary Pictures and direct a film adaptation of the Annie Jacobsen non-fiction book Nuclear War: A Scenario.

On 25 June 2025, Amazon MGM Studios announced that the company had selected Villeneuve to direct the 26th James Bond film, with an expected release date in 2028 and on 31 July 2025, the company announced that Steven Knight would write the film.

Also on 25 June 2025, Villeneuve released a statement saying:

I grew up watching James Bond films with my father, ever since Dr. No with Sean Connery. I'm a die-hard Bond fan. To me, he’s sacred territory. I intend to honor the tradition and open the path for many new missions to come.

Villeneuve had previously been offered to direct No Time to Die (2021) but had declined in favor of directing Dune (2021).

== Influences and style ==
Starting with Polytechnique, Villeneuve became known for a visual style based on long takes, precise mise-en-scène, steady camerawork, periods of wordless silence to emphasize moody atmosphere, and shallow focus, high-contrast cinematography. Amongst a core theme of Villeneuve's films are characters who struggle with their identities in worlds of isolation, such as the case with Sicario (Kate Macer), Enemy (Adam Bell), Arrival (Louise Banks), Blade Runner 2049 (Officer K), and the Dune movies.

Villeneuve has cited Steven Spielberg, Stanley Kubrick, Alfred Hitchcock, the Coen brothers, Paul Thomas Anderson, Ridley Scott, Sam Mendes, Jean-Luc Godard, François Truffaut, Ingmar Bergman, Yorgos Lanthimos, and Christopher Nolan as his main cinematic influences.

== Personal life ==
Villeneuve is married to Tanya Lapointe, a journalist and filmmaker, and he has three children from a previous relationship. Villeneuve and Lapointe work together on film projects as director-producer partners, with Lapointe saying: "I'm an extension of his brain." Some of her upcoming projects include Dune: Part Three, Nuclear War: A Scenario and Bond 26.

His daughter Salomé Villeneuve is also a filmmaker, whose debut short film III premiered at the 2022 Venice Film Festival. Previously, Villeneuve had a relationship with Macha Grenon.

Villeneuve is an active supporter of the arts in Quebec and Canada, encouraging young filmmakers in the country.

== Filmography ==
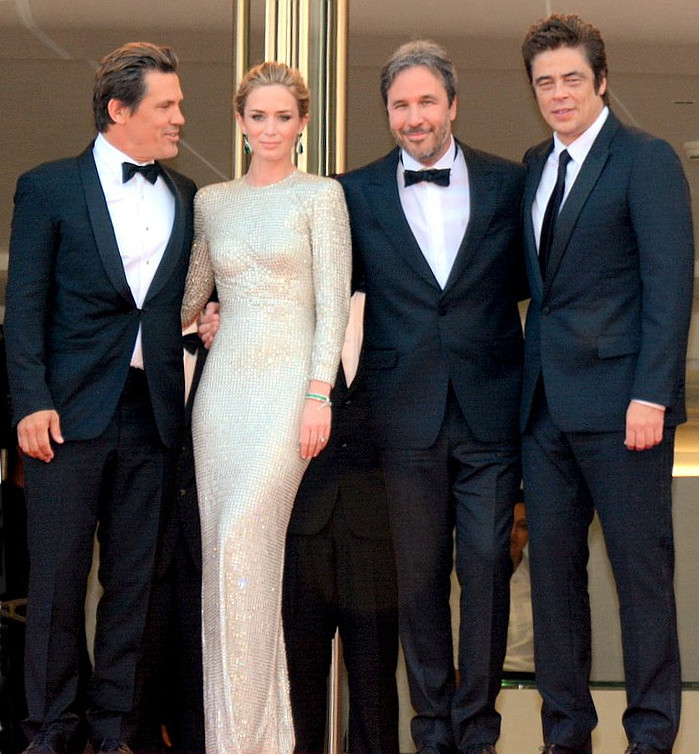
Villeneuve with Josh Brolin, Emily Blunt, and Benicio del Toro at the 2015 Cannes Film Festival premiere of Sicario

Key
| † | Denotes films that have not yet been released |

Film

| Year | Title | Director | Writer | Producer |
|---|---|---|---|---|
| 1998 | August 32nd on Earth | Yes | Yes | No |
| 2000 | Maelström | Yes | Yes | No |
| 2009 | Polytechnique | Yes | Yes | No |
| 2010 | Incendies | Yes | Yes | No |
| 2013 | Prisoners | Yes | No | No |
| 2013 | Enemy | Yes | No | No |
| 2015 | Sicario | Yes | No | No |
| 2016 | Arrival | Yes | No | No |
| 2017 | Blade Runner 2049 | Yes | No | No |
| 2021 | Dune | Yes | Yes | Yes |
| 2024 | Dune: Part Two | Yes | Yes | Yes |
| 2026 | Dune: Part Three † | Yes | Yes | Yes |

Short film

| Year | Title | Director | Writer | Editor | Notes | Ref. |
|---|---|---|---|---|---|---|
| 1990 | La Course destination monde | Yes | No | No | TV short | |
| 1990 | Terre des Hommes | Yes | Yes | Yes | La Course Europe-Asie | |
| 1994 | REW FFWD | Yes | Yes | No | | |
| 1994 | "Ensorcelée" | Yes | No | Yes | Music video for Daniel Bélanger | |
| 1994 | "Les Femmes Préfèrent Les Ginos" | Yes | No | Yes | Music video for Zébulon | |
| 1995 | "Tout simplement jaloux" | Yes | No | No | Music video for Beau Dommage | |
| 1995 | Querer | Yes | No | Yes | Commercial for Alegría by Cirque du Soleil | |
| 1996 | Le Technétium | Yes | Yes | No | Segment from the film Cosmos | |
| 2006 | 120 Seconds to Get Elected | Yes | Yes | No | | |
| 2008 | Next Floor | Yes | No | No | | |
| 2011 | Rated R for Nudity | Yes | Yes | Yes | | |
| 2011 | Étude empirique sur l'influence du son sur la persistance rétinienne | Yes | Yes | Yes | | |

== Frequent collaborators ==
| Work Person | 1998 | 2009 | 2010 | 2013 | 2013 | 2015 | 2016 | 2017 | 2021 | 2024 | 2026 | —N/a |
| Work Person | August 32nd on Earth | Polytechnique | Incendies | Prisoners | Enemy | Sicario | Arrival | Blade Runner 2049 | Dune | Dune: Part Two | Dune: Part Three | Total |
|---|---|---|---|---|---|---|---|---|---|---|---|---|
| Raoul Trujillo | Yes | | | | | Yes | | | | | | 2 |
| Maxim Gaudette | | Yes | Yes | | | | | | | | | 2 |
| Dave Bautista | | | | | | | | Yes | Yes | Yes | | 3 |
| Jake Gyllenhaal | | | | Yes | Yes | | | | | | | 2 |
| Josh Brolin | | | | | | Yes | | | Yes | Yes | Yes | 4 |
| David Dastmalchian | | | | Yes | | | | Yes | Yes | | | 3 |
| Timothée Chalamet | | | | | | | | | Yes | Yes | Yes | 3 |
| Zendaya | | | | | | | | | Yes | Yes | Yes | 3 |
| Rebecca Ferguson | | | | | | | | | Yes | Yes | Yes | 3 |
| Jason Momoa | | | | | | | | | Yes | | Yes | 2 |
| Stellan Skarsgård | | | | | | | | | Yes | Yes | | 2 |
| Javier Bardem | | | | | | | | | Yes | Yes | Yes | 3 |
| Charlotte Rampling | | | | | | | | | Yes | Yes | Yes | 3 |
| Stephen McKinley Henderson | | | | | | | | | Yes | Yes | | 2 |
| Babs Olusanmokun | | | | | | | | | Yes | Yes | | 2 |
| Roger Yuan | | | | | | | | | Yes | Yes | | 2 |
| Florence Pugh | | | | | | | | | | Yes | Yes | 2 |
| Anya Taylor-Joy | | | | | | | | | | Yes | Yes | 2 |
| Roger Deakins (Cinematographer) | | | | Yes | | Yes | | Yes | | | | 3 |
| Joe Walker (Film Editor) | | | | | | Yes | Yes | Yes | Yes | Yes | Yes | 6 |
| Jóhann Jóhannsson (Composer) | | | | Yes | | Yes | Yes | | | | | 3 |
| Hans Zimmer (Composer) | | | | | | | | Yes | Yes | Yes | Yes | 4 |
| Richard King (Sound Designer) | | | | | | | | | | Yes | Yes | 2 |
| Ron Bartlett (Re-recording mixer) | | | | | | | | Yes | Yes | Yes | Yes | 4 |

== Reception ==
| Film | Rotten Tomatoes | Metacritic | BFCA | CinemaScore | Budget | Box office |
|---|---|---|---|---|---|---|
| August 32nd on Earth | —N/a | 61 | —N/a | —N/a | —N/a | —N/a |
| Maelström | 79% | 66 | 71/100 | —N/a | $3.4 million | $0.3 million |
| Polytechnique | 88% | 63 | —N/a | —N/a | $6 million | $1.6 million |
| Incendies | 91% | 80 | 87/100 | —N/a | $6.8 million | $16.1 million |
| Prisoners | 81% | 70 | 85/100 | B+ | $46 million | $122.2 million |
| Enemy | 73% | 61 | 74/100 | —N/a | —N/a | $4.6 million |
| Sicario | 91% | 82 | 89/100 | A− | $30 million | $84.9 million |
| Arrival | 94% | 81 | 88/100 | B | $47 million | $203.4 million |
| Blade Runner 2049 | 88% | 81 | 87/100 | A− | $185 million | $267.7 million |
| Dune | 83% | 74 | 86/100 | A− | $165 million | $406 million |
| Dune: Part Two | 92% | 79 | 93/100 | A | $190 million | $711.8 million |

== Awards and nominations ==
He is a four-time recipient of the Canadian Screen Award (formerly Genie Award) for Best Direction, winning for Maelström in 2001, Polytechnique in 2009, Incendies in 2010 and Enemy in 2013. The first three of these films also won the Canadian Screen Award for Best Motion Picture, while the latter was awarded the prize for best Canadian film of the year by the Toronto Film Critics Association. He was awarded the prize of Director of the Decade by the Hollywood Critics Association in December 2019. On May 31, 2024, he received the Academy Icon Award at the 12th Canadian Screen Awards.

| Year | Title | Academy Awards | | BAFTA Awards | | Golden Globe Awards | |
| Year | Title | Nominations | Wins | Nominations | Wins | Nominations | Wins |
|---|---|---|---|---|---|---|---|
| 2010 | Incendies | 1 | | 1 | | | |
| 2013 | Prisoners | 1 | | | | | |
| 2015 | Sicario | 3 | | 3 | | | |
| 2016 | Arrival | 8 | 1 | 9 | 1 | 2 | |
| 2017 | Blade Runner 2049 | 5 | 2 | 8 | 2 | | |
| 2021 | Dune | 10 | 6 | 11 | 5 | 3 | 1 |
| 2024 | Dune: Part Two | 5 | 2 | 7 | 2 | 2 | |
| Total | | 33 | 11 | 39 | 10 | 7 | 1 |

== Honours ==
Commonwealth
| Location | Date | Appointment | Post-nominal letters |
|---|---|---|---|
| Canada | July 5, 2018 – present | Officer of the Order of Canada | OC |
| Quebec | 2019–present | Knight of the National Order of Quebec | CQ |
| Canada | 2012 | Canadian Version of the Queen Elizabeth II Diamond Jubilee Medal | N/A |

Honorary Degrees
| Location | Date | School | Degree | Gave commencement address |
|---|---|---|---|---|
| Quebec | December 5, 2017 | Université du Québec à Montréal | Doctorate | Yes |

Memberships and fellowships
| Location | Date | Organization | Position |
|---|---|---|---|
| California | 2014–present | Academy of Motion Picture Arts and Sciences | Member (Directors Branch) |

Other medals
| Location | Date | Appointment |
|---|---|---|
| France | 2024–present | Knight of the Order of Arts and Letters |
