= Vaughan Murrae =

Canadian actor

- Born: 2005/2006 (age 20–21); Hamilton, Ontario, Canada
- Occupation: Actor

Vaughan Murrae (born 2005/2006) is a Canadian actor and model. They are known for playing non-binary characters.

== Early life ==
Murrae is from Hamilton, Ontario. They began questioning their identity during grade school. Before coming out nonbinary they first explored other identities wondering if they might be lesbian or transmasculine. A 2022 CBC article quotes Murrae, "At first, I was like, 'Oh, I'm a lesbian,' then I was like, 'Nevermind, I'm a guy,' and then I came out as nonbinary." Vaughan has consistently identified nonbinary since their time in grade school.

== Career ==
=== Representation ===
At the age of 12, Murrae began their career at Anita Norris Model Management (ANM Management). The agency had a newly established talent division for which Vaughan was tested into, then given the option to either list in the agency's modeling division, or in the talent division. Vaughan chose acting as their principal endeavour while also picking up minor modeling assignments through the agency throughout their first years.

In 2022 Murrae signed with Canadian talent management agency Oscars Abrams and Zimmel + Associates (OAZ Inc) with Daniel Abrams as their principal representative.

2025 Murrae added USA representation with Untitled Management with Ashley Josephson as their principal representative.

=== Performances ===
In 2019, Murrae's first screen appearance was in the Shaftesbury Films kid's production "Solutioneers".

In 2020, Murrae appeared in the Apple TV series Ghostwriter.

In 2022, Murrae's first feature film breakthrough performance was as Robin in Trevor Anderson's Before I Change My Mind. For their leading role, they became the first nonbinary actor to win the Boccalino d'Oro (Golden Jug) for Best Performance at the 75th Locarno Film Festival; the jury amended the award's name to be gender-neutral for the occasion. Murrae is quoted in The Original Magazine: "They had changed the name of the award for me... to 'Best Acting Performance,'" Murrae explains. "That was something that I just did not expect to happen."

In 2024, Murrae played the role of KC in the Hallmark Channel series The Way Home.

In 2026, Murrae played the role of Kelly in the Hulu miniseries Malcolm in the Middle: Life's Still Unfair.

== Personal life ==
Murrae is nonbinary and goes by they/them pronouns.
