= Still Night, Burning House =

2026 Canadian documentary film

- Directed by: Carol Nguyen
- Written by: Carol Nguyen
- Produced by: Audrey-Anne Dupuis-Pierre; Robert Vroom
- Cinematography: Juliette Lossky
- Edited by: Anouk Deschênes
- Music by: Arie Verheul van de Ven
- Production companies: Metafilms; National Film Board of Canada; Portage Films
- Release date: September 12, 2026 (TIFF)
- Running time: 76 minutes
- Country: Canada
- Languages: English; Vietnamese

Still Night, Burning House is a Canadian documentary film, directed by Carol Nguyen and released in 2026. The film is a portrait of her Vietnamese Canadian family, coming together following the death of her uncle who struggled with mental health issues.

The film premiered in the TIFF Docs program at the 2026 Toronto International Film Festival. It is also slated to screen in the National Competition at the 2026 Festival du nouveau cinéma.

At the 2026 Vancouver International Film Festival, it received an honorable mention for the Tides Award for Best Canadian Documentary.
