= No Crying at the Dinner Table =

2019 film

- Film poster
- Directed by: Carol Nguyen
- Produced by: Carol Nguyen; Aziz Zoromba
- Cinematography: Walid Jabri
- Edited by: Carol Nguyen; Andres Solis
- Music by: Arie Verheul van de Ven
- Distributed by: Travelling Distribution
- Release date: September 10, 2019 (TIFF)
- Running time: 16 minutes
- Country: Canada
- Language: Vietnamese

No Crying at the Dinner Table is a 2019 Canadian short documentary film, directed by Carol Nguyen. An exploration of the common stigma in Asian families against expressing emotional vulnerability, the film centres on interviews Nguyen conducted with her family, played back around the dinner table at a family gathering.

The film premiered at the 2019 Toronto International Film Festival. In December 2019, the film was named to TIFF's annual year-end Canada's Top Ten list for short films.

The film received a Canadian Screen Award nomination for Best Short Documentary at the 8th Canadian Screen Awards in 2020.
