= Adult Best Friends =

2024 film by Delaney Buffett

- Promotional poster
- Directed by: Delaney Buffett
- Written by: Delaney Buffett; Katie Corwin
- Produced by: Delaney Buffett; Marie Nikolova
- Starring: Delaney Buffett; Katie Corwin; Mason Gooding; Zachary Quinto
- Cinematography: Jessica Pantoja
- Edited by: Ian Holden
- Music by: Alexandra Kalinowski
- Production companies: Before The Door Pictures; Coffin Watson Pictures
- Distributed by: Gravitas Ventures
- Release dates: June 8, 2024 (Tribeca); February 26, 2025 (United States)
- Running time: 83 minutes
- Country: United States
- Language: English

Adult Best Friends is a 2024 American comedy film directed by Delaney Buffett, who co-wrote the film with Katie Corwin. The film stars Buffett and Corwin as fictionalized versions of themselves, and follows two co-dependent adult friends who must cope with one of their engagements. The film premiered at Tribeca Festival on June 8, 2024, and was released on February 26, 2025 by Gravitas Ventures.

== Premise ==
Inseparable since childhood, levelheaded Katie takes her co-dependent best friend Delaney on a girls' trip to break the news that she is getting married.

== Cast ==
- Delaney Buffett as Delaney
  - Keeley Karsten as Young Delaney
- Katie Corwin as Katie
  - Jolie Handler as Young Katie
- Mason Gooding as John
- Zachary Quinto as Henry
- Hannah Campbell as Mel
- Carmen Christopher as Phil
- Cazzie David as Roxy
- Connor Hines as Charlie
- Alexander Hodge as Theo
- Miki Ishikawa as Gwen
- Heather Mazur as Daria
- Benjamin Norris as Kyle
- Michael Rowland as Tommy
- Owen Thiele as Luca

== Production ==
The film was shot over 16 days in Mississippi. While the plot is fictional, Buffett and Corwin based certain events and personality traits off their real-life experiences.

== Release ==
Adult Best Friends premiered at the Tribeca Festival on June 8, 2024. It had a limited theatrical run beginning on February 26, 2025, before streaming on Max starting May 2, 2025.

== Reception ==
On the review aggregator website Rotten Tomatoes, 85% of 13 critics' reviews are positive.

Writing for Variety, Murtada Elfadl said:

Doing double duty as the film's screenwriters and stars, Katie Corwin and Delaney Buffett craft a believable friendship for their lead characters (also called Katie and Delaney) and write some decent dialogue about why people would or would not marry. Something is missing, however — the film ends up being more dull than hilarious.
