= Claude Villeneuve (judge) =

Canadian lawyer and judge

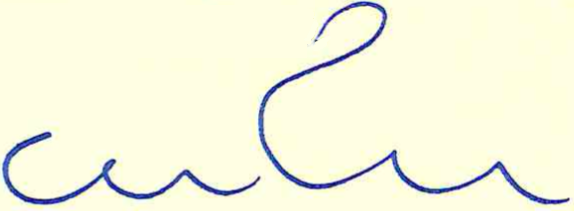

Judge of the Superior Court of Quebec
- Incumbent
- Assumed office June 2015

Personal details
- Born: June 30, 1969 (age 57) Bécancour, Quebec
- Education: Université de Sherbrooke
- Occupation: Lawyer, judge, teacher

Claude Villeneuve (born 30 June 1969, in Bécancour, Quebec) is a Quebec lawyer, judge, and teacher.

== Biography ==
Claude Villeneuve is the second son of Jean Villeneuve, a notary, and Nicole Demers, and the brother of Quebec filmmakers Denis Villeneuve and Martin Villeneuve. While his two brothers pursued careers in filmmaking, Claude Villeneuve chose a career in law instead. In 1991, he earned a bachelor's degree in law from the Université de Sherbrooke, followed by a master's degree in health law in 1992. He became a member of the Bar of Quebec and the Saint-François Bar in 1993.

Around 1997, he took a position with the legal affairs department of the City of Sherbrooke.

In 2006, Claude Villeneuve was hired by the firm Heenan Blaikie, and then by the Lavery firm in Sherbrooke in 2014, where he specialized in litigation, commercial law, and labour law.

He received a tribute from the Bar of Quebec in 2013 for his involvement in the aftermath of the Lac-Mégantic rail disaster.

In 2014, Claude Villeneuve was elected bâtonnier (president) of the Saint-François Bar for the 2014–2015 term. He was re-elected to the position for the following term in 2015. In June 2015, while serving as bâtonnier, Claude Villeneuve was appointed as a judge of the Superior Court of Quebec, an appointment he accepted while having to give up his position as bâtonnier.

Claude Villeneuve's name has appeared sporadically in Quebec legal news, as he has presided over a number of cases that received media attention. Over the course of his career, he has also taught at the Quebec Bar School and at the Faculty of Law of the Université de Sherbrooke. In the course of his duties, Judge Villeneuve has sat at the Drummondville and Sherbrooke courthouses.

=== Controversy ===
On January 29, 2026, Judge Villeneuve was caught in a scandal after being charged with "communicating with a person for the purpose of obtaining sexual services for consideration," in connection with an incident reportedly occurring on 12 December 2025. Due to the seriousness of the charges, he was relieved of all his duties that same day, and his first court appearance was scheduled for February 12, 2026. Claude Villeneuve was absent from his hearing but was represented by his lawyer, Patrick Fréchette, who entered a not-guilty plea in a courtroom where his client once presided as judge.

Judge Villeneuve's arrest took place in Sherbrooke as part of the Changement de comportement, conscientisation, éducation et sensibilisation sur l'exploitation sexuelle program (C3ESSES; roughly, "Behaviour Change, Awareness, Education and Sensitization on Sexual Exploitation"), which aims to reduce the purchase of sexual services and the risk of reoffending. In this program, police officers pose as escorts, and a person who falls for the ruse is offered an alternative to criminal prosecution. The program consists of one day of awareness training on the dynamics of sexual exploitation and eight meetings with a sexologist. To take part in this extrajudicial process, Claude Villeneuve was required to acknowledge the truth of the facts alleged against him and paid $1,500 to the Crime Victims Assistance Fund. As a result of his participation in the C3ESSES program, the charge against Claude Villeneuve was dropped on 22 May 2026.

Separately, the Canadian Judicial Council opened its own disciplinary inquiry into Claude Villeneuve, since it is this body that is responsible for determining whether he will be able to preside as a judge once again. The Canadian Judicial Council is notably mandated to ensure the irreproachable conduct of judges under its authority.

== See also ==
- Bar of Quebec
- Canadian Judicial Council
- Superior Court of Quebec
