= Malcolm in the Middle: Life's Still Unfair =

2026 American comedy series

- Promotional poster
- Genre: Sitcom; Slapstick
- Created by: Linwood Boomer
- Based on: Malcolm in the Middle by Linwood Boomer
- Written by: Linwood Boomer; Michael Glouberman; Matthew Carlson; Gary Murphy; Al Higgins
- Directed by: Ken Kwapis
- Starring: Bryan Cranston; Justin Berfield; Christopher Masterson; Keeley Karsten; Vaughan Murrae; Anthony Timpano; Kiana Madeira; Jane Kaczmarek; Frankie Muniz
- Music by: Campfire
- Ending theme: "Boss of Me" performed by Drama Dolls
- Country of origin: United States
- Original language: English
- No. of episodes: 4

Production
- Executive producers: Arnon Milchan; Yariv Milchan; Natalie Lehmann; Bryan Cranston; Ken Kwapis; Tracy Katsky Boomer; Gail Berman; Linwood Boomer
- Producer: Jimmy Simons
- Production locations: Vancouver, British Columbia, Canada
- Cinematography: Michael Weaver
- Editor: Steve Welch
- Running time: 25–34 minutes
- Production companies: New Regency; The Jackal Group; New Satin City Productions; 20th Television

Original release
- Network: Hulu; Disney+
- Release: April 10, 2026

Related
- Malcolm in the Middle (2000-2006)

Malcolm in the Middle: Life's Still Unfair is an American television sitcom miniseries created by Linwood Boomer for Hulu. It is a revival of Malcolm in the Middle (2000–2006), produced by New Satin City Productions, The Jackal Group, Regency Television, and 20th Television.

In December 2024, it was announced that a revival was in the works for Disney+ with Frankie Muniz, Bryan Cranston and Jane Kaczmarek reprising their roles. The series follows Malcolm and his daughter as he visits his parents for their 40th wedding anniversary. Initially, the project had been pitched as a two-hour movie before being split into four 30-minute episodes for the streaming service. The series was filmed between April and May 2025, with Ken Kwapis returning from the original series to direct every episode. Christopher Masterson, Emy Coligado, and Justin Berfield also return from the original series. Vaughan Murrae, Keeley Karsten, and Kiana Madeira all appear in starring roles.

Malcolm in the Middle: Life's Still Unfair was released in its entirety on April 10, 2026.

== Premise ==
Almost 20 years after the end of the original series, Malcolm now lives a happy life with his daughter Leah and girlfriend Tristan, having distanced himself from his birth family. Moreover, he has lied and told Leah that his parents Hal and Lois are deceased and he is an only child, while in turn keeping her a secret from them. He is forced to tell the truth to everyone and re-engage with the family chaos when his parents demand his presence for their 40th wedding anniversary party.

== Cast ==
=== Main ===
- Bryan Cranston as Hal, the family's well-meaning and loving but inept and immature patriarch who depends on Lois.
- Justin Berfield as Reese, Hal and Lois's second and most impulsive child, who lacks basic life skills but excels at cooking, became a high school janitor at the end of the original series, and now makes money by posting videos of Hal's humiliation.
- Christopher Masterson as Francis, Hal and Lois's oldest and most rebellious child, who was sent to military school at age 15 for bad behavior, but left the school and emancipated himself at 17, and worked several odd jobs nationwide before getting a stable job at a large tech company. He is staying in his parents' garage with his wife while in town for their anniversary.
- Keeley Karsten as Leah, Malcolm's daughter, who narrates the series by breaking the fourth wall like her father does.
- Vaughan Murrae as Kelly, Hal and Lois's self-sufficient, studious, non-binary youngest child serving as the family's informant, with whom Lois became pregnant in the original series finale.
- Kiana Madeira as Tristan, Malcolm's girlfriend.
- Jane Kaczmarek as Lois, the family's temperamental and overbearing but intelligent and decisive matriarch, who formerly worked at the Lucky Aide retail drugstore.
- Frankie Muniz as Malcolm, the third child and middle son of Hal and Lois with a genius IQ of 165, who narrates the series by breaking the fourth wall. An alumnus of Harvard College, which he began attending in the original series finale, he now owns a food charity and has a daughter from a previous one-night stand.

=== Recurring ===
- Gary Anthony Williams as Abe Kenarban, Hal and Lois's close friend and Stevie's father
- David Anthony Higgins as Craig Feldspar, a close family friend and ex-manager of Lucky Aide, who now manages the local Huge Mart
- Emy Coligado as Piama, Francis's Alaskan Native wife, whom he married while living in Alaska, and is pregnant with their first child
- Caleb Ellsworth-Clark as Dewey, Hal and Lois's often-ignored fourth child who is now a successful world-traveling musician and has had many love affairs. The adult Dewey only appears via web video communication and flashbacks, while Erik Per Sullivan, who played Dewey in the original series, appears as his childhood self in flashbacks via archival footage.
- Craig Lamar Traylor as Stevie Kenarban, Malcolm's disabled childhood friend and fellow "Krelboyne", the nickname given to students in the gifted class from Malcolm's junior high school years, who was born with only one lung and uses a wheelchair
- Anthony Timpano as Jamie, Hal and Lois's fifth child and youngest son who was a toddler on the original show and now serves in the United States Coast Guard

=== Guest ===
- Dan Martin, Alex Morris, John Marshall Jones, and Jonathan Craig Williams as Malik, Trey, Brian, and Steve, respectively, Hal and Abe's poker buddies and fellow stage bandmates. Brian was originally portrayed by Edward James Gage in the original series.
- Todd Giebenhain as Richie, Francis's slow-witted old friend who now works as a physician in the clinic Abe takes Hal to
- Erik Gow as Glenn, Stevie's partner, with whom he adopted a son named Max
- Merrin Dungey as Kitty Kenarban, Stevie's mother and Abe's ex-wife
- Eric Nenninger as Eric Hanson, a former cadet at Marlin Academy, the military school where Francis was sent, who moved to Alaska and incentivized Francis to join him. He is still close friends with former cadets Drew Horton and Ken Finley, and they continue to waste their lives pulling pranks, much to Francis's confusion.
- Drew Powell as Drew Horton, a former cadet at Marlin Academy
- Arjay Smith as Ken Finley, a former cadet at Marlin Academy
- Meagen Fay as Gretchen Mannkuser, Francis's former boss at The Grotto hotel and dude ranch and widow of Otto, who himself was killed by a puma. She now works as a doula and is first to discover that Piama is pregnant.
- Finn Wolfhard as Wayne, the event planner for Hal and Lois's anniversary party
- Aryan Simhadri as Manjushri, a bodhisattva whose presence Hal hallucinates while on heavy drugs
- Kyle Sullivan as Dabney, Malcolm's former classmate and fellow "Krelboyne"
- Victor Z. Isaac as Kevin, Malcolm's former classmate and fellow "Krelboyne"
- Evan Matthew Cohen as Lloyd, Malcolm's former classmate and fellow "Krelboyne"
- Jett Klyne as Jason, a boy who Leah has a crush on

Photographs of Cloris Leachman, Daniel von Bargen and Kenneth Mars are used to represent their respective Malcolm in the Middle characters: Ida Welker, Lois's Eastern European-born mother; Commandant Edwin Spangler, the head of Marlin Academy during Francis's time there; and Otto Mankusser, Gretchen's late husband.

== Episodes ==
No.	Title	Directed by	Written by	Original release date	Prod. code
1	"Episode One"	Ken Kwapis	Linwood Boomer	April 10, 2026	1JJU01
Malcolm now runs a food charity, is raising a teenage daughter named Leah (who has inherited his fourth wall breaking), and is dating a woman named Tristan. However, he has cut himself off from his birth family while claiming to Leah, whom he never told his parents about, that his parents are deceased. Lois and Hal are preparing for their 40th anniversary, with the latter going above and beyond to show his affection. Meanwhile, Francis has moved into the garage with his wife Piama, who is pregnant with the couple's first child, Reese has become obsessed with fixing things around the house, Dewey is a musician on tour, Jamie is in the Coast Guard, and youngest sibling Kelly secretly communicates with Malcolm, who soon learns that they have become "the informer" of the family after they out Malcolm's refusal to attend the anniversary. Hal and Lois confront Malcolm at home just as he starts introducing Leah and Tristan to each other. Malcolm's parents are shocked to learn that they are now grandparents, Leah is shocked that her grandparents are alive, and Malcolm runs off into the far distance.
2	"Episode Two"	Ken Kwapis	Linwood Boomer and Michael Glouberman	April 10, 2026	1JJU02
Leah and Tristan are both upset with Malcolm with the latter insisting that he make amends with his family. Leah secretly communicates with her extended family, surprised to learn of their existence and ultimately connecting with Piama, who gives her good advice on how to make friends easily. She then befriends a boy named Jason. Hal slowly dissolves into a depressed state, especially when he finds out that Reese has been making money off of his humiliations online. Lois grows deeply concerned after he declines sex. Francis becomes obsessed with trying to rise in importance to Lois after she admits that he and Piama having a baby is eighth on her "list". To avoid ruining the anniversary, Hal has Abe take him to a doctor, who turns out to be Francis's old friend Richie, to cure his depression. He accidentally downs 60 milligrams of his drug and prepares to face his hallucinations.
3	"Episode Three"	Ken Kwapis	Linwood Boomer and Matthew Carlson & Gary Murphy	April 10, 2026	1JJU03
Hal hallucinates a conversation with his "perfect" self, only to realize that it is actually an evil version that wants him to kill his family. Hal triumphs and concludes that his job is to bring happiness to his family. Malcolm tries to talk with Tristan, but she will only talk to Leah. Leah and Tristan ultimately kidnap Malcolm and force him back to his family. As they air out their laundry, Tristan tells Malcolm that she was once arrested for attempted murder, though the charges were dismissed. As Reese and Kelly enter a sibling war, Francis tries to get higher on Lois's list by offering her money. He later learns that she bought booties for his future child. Lois finds Hal sobering up from the drugs and angrily drives him home, only for the two of them to get into a car crash.
4	"Episode Four"	Ken Kwapis	Linwood Boomer and Al Higgins	April 10, 2026	1JJU04
Lois gets a leg cast, but refuses to sit as the day of the anniversary has arrived. Everyone, except Dewey, who is still on tour, comes to the anniversary party where they reunite with many old friends and acquaintances. Leah becomes offended that Jason tries sexting with her, but gets revenge by posting his texts. Malcolm still refuses to talk to his family, forcing Lois to confront him. She tells Malcolm they were getting him ready for life. Malcolm is angry, but realizes that he has made something of himself and thus has fulfilled Lois's wishes. Lois presents a video of the children and friends celebrating Hal. Afterwards, Malcolm goes up and admits he was wrong for denying himself the chance to be with his family. He proposes to Tristan, but she declines, wanting to prioritize resolidifying their relationship instead. Francis causes an accident that coats all the partygoers in glitter, and Malcolm resumes arguing with his family, but embracing it. Leah also decides to help her father as best as she can.

== Production ==
=== Development ===
In 2016, Bryan Cranston openly expressed interest in doing a reunion of Malcolm in the Middle. In 2021, while speaking on Steve-O's podcast, Frankie Muniz revealed that Cranston was writing a script for a movie reunion and that the entire cast was ready to return except for one hold out, though he kept the identity confidential. In December 2023, it was suggested that the hold out was show creator Linwood Boomer during Muniz's appearance on Mayim Bialik's podcast and that he would only be part of the revival if two specific previous writers were on board.

In December 2024, it was announced that a four-episode revival was in the works for Disney+ with Muniz, Cranston and Jane Kaczmarek reprising their roles. It follows Malcolm and his daughter as Hal and Lois demand their presence for their 40th wedding anniversary party. Initially, the project had been pitched as a two-hour movie before being split into four 30-minute episodes for the service. In March 2025, it was revealed that Justin Berfield and Christopher Masterson would reprise their roles, while Erik Per Sullivan was replaced by Caleb Ellsworth-Clark as Dewey, as Sullivan had left acting in 2010. Further casting decisions were also revealed with the additions of Anthony Timpano (Jamie), Vaughan Murrae (as new sibling Kelly), Kiana Madeira (as Malcolm's girlfriend Tristan) and Keeley Karsten (as Malcolm's daughter Leah). Ken Kwapis, who directed 19 episodes of the original series, directed all episodes of the mini-series; while Boomer, Alan J. Higgins, Michael Glouberman, Matthew Carlson, and Gary Murphy returned as writers.

=== Filming ===
Principal photography began on April 13, 2025, at Vancouver Film Studios, and concluded on May 16, 2025, with Michael Weaver serving as the cinematographer.

== Release ==
The four-episode miniseries premiered on Hulu on April 10, 2026.

== Reception ==
=== Critical response ===
The review aggregator website Rotten Tomatoes reported an 82% approval rating based on 49 critic reviews. The website's critics consensus reads, "No repeat questions here; Malcolm in the Middle aptly returns to its comic antics with assured vigor, and even though Life's Still Unfair this revival is teeming with success." Metacritic, which uses a weighted average, gave a score of 65 out of 100 based on 23 critics, indicating "generally favorable" reviews.

=== Viewership ===
In its first weekend, the series debuted with 8.1 million global views, becoming Hulu's most-watched premiere season of 2026 up to that point. Life's Still Unfair also became the second most-watched Disney+ premiere series of all time in other parts of the Americas with 3.6 million views.

== Awards and nominations ==
Award	Date of ceremony	Category	Recipient(s)	Results	Ref.
Nickelodeon Kids' Choice Awards	November 14, 2026	Favorite Family TV Show	Malcolm in the Middle: Life's Still Unfair	Nominated	
Nickelodeon Kids' Choice Awards	November 14, 2026	Favorite Male TV Star (Family)	Bryan Cranston	Nominated	
Nickelodeon Kids' Choice Awards	November 14, 2026	Favorite Male TV Star (Family)	Frankie Muniz	Nominated	
