= Oasis (2022 film) =

- Directed by: Justine Martin
- Written by: Justine Martin
- Produced by: Louis-Emmanuel Gagné-Brochu
- Starring: Raphaël Cormier; Rémi Cormier
- Cinematography: Myriam Payette
- Edited by: Félix Bouffard-Dumas
- Music by: Louis-Joseph Cliche
- Production company: Déjà Vu
- Distributed by: Travelling Distribution
- Release date: October 19, 2022 (FNC)
- Running time: 15 minutes
- Country: Canada
- Language: French

Oasis is a Canadian short documentary film, directed by Justine Martin and released in 2022. The film centres on Raphaël and Rémi Cormier, twin brothers in their early teens who are spending a summer together before their lives undergo significant change, as Raphaël has a disability that means he and his brother will be forced to attend different schools for the first time, and thus will not always be able to spend as much time together in the future as they have in the past.

Martin knew the boys because she was once their babysitter.

The film premiered at the 2022 Festival du nouveau cinéma. On January 10, 2024, the film was shortlisted for an Academy Award for Best Documentary Short Film.

== Awards ==
Award	Date of ceremony	Category	Recipient(s)	Result	Ref(s)
Prix collégial du cinéma québécois	2023	Best Short Film	Justine Martin	Won	
Prix Iris	December 10, 2023	Best Short Documentary	Justine Martin	Nominated	
Canadian Screen Awards	May 2024	Best Short Documentary	Justine Martin	Nominated	
