= Ottawa International Film Festival =

Coordinates: 45.421°N 75.696°W

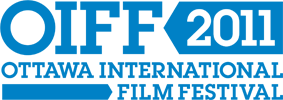
- OIFF Logo
- Location: Ottawa, Canada
- Founded: 2010
- No. of films: 31 (2011)
- Language: English and French

The Ottawa International Film Festival (OIFF) was an Ottawa-based, publicly attended film festival that held its first annual competition in 2010. The festival ran annually for three days. The festival screened shorts and feature-length films of any genre and of any country of origin. The 2010 program yielded one full day of Canadian films and another day of international films. Closely linked to local 72-hour film challenges, the Second Ottawa International Film Festival ran from August 17–21, 2011. The 2011 program presented 24 short films and seven feature films, including three world premieres and one each of Canadian and Ottawa premieres. The festival closed with a competition of locally produced music videos and bands. Hollywood producer Aaron Ryder had been linked to the festival and provided a Q + A after screening his films Donnie Darko and Memento in the August program. Ottawa-based film A Violent State by director Adrian Langley was awarded the 2011 Lieutenant's Pump Award for Best Film.

The festival was last staged in 2015. In its place, a new International Film Festival of Ottawa (IFFO) was organized by the Canadian Film Institute to launch in 2020.
