= Clara Milo =

Clara Milo is a Canadian filmmaker from Quebec, most noted as co-director with Juliette Lossky of the 2024 short film Himalia.

She first became known for her 2021 short film Aska, which won the Coup de cœur award in the Prends ça court! program at the 2022 edition of the Rendez-vous Québec Cinéma.

== Filmography ==
- Aska - 2021
- Himalia - 2024

== Awards ==
Award	Date of ceremony	Category	Work	Result	Ref.
Canadian Screen Awards	2026	Best Live Action Short Drama	Himalia with Catherine Boily, Rosalie Chicoine Perreault, Juliette Lossky	Nominated	
Cinéfest Sudbury International Film Festival	2022	Outstanding Short Film	Aska	Won	
Festival Plein(s) Écran(s)	2026	Grand Prix	Himalia with Juliette Lossky	Won	
Prix collégial du cinéma québécois	2025	Best Short Film	Himalia with Juliette Lossky	Nominated	
Rendez-vous Québec Cinéma	2022	Coup de cœur	Aska	Won	
