= Romeo Bosetti =

Italian-born French silent film director

Roméo Bosetti
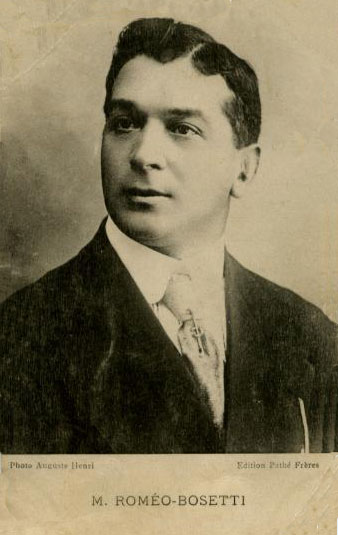

Roméo Giuseppe Bosetti (18 January 1879 – 27 October 1948) was an Italian-born French cinematographer, actor, and early film impresario known for comedy, burlesque, mime, and hilariously provocative visual humor. As one of the earliest pioneers of animation and slapstick, he had an enormous influence on global filmmakers, notably Mack Sennett and Charlie Chaplin. His experiments with trick photography in the 1912 film Le garde-meubles automatique inspired poet Vachel Lindsay's 1915 essay "The Motion Picture of Fairy Splendor." For his service and wounding in World War I, he was a recipient of the French Croix de Guerre (1914-1918). In 1913 he was made an Officier des Palmes Académiques, France's oldest order of merit.

== Early life ==
Bosetti was born the son of Filomena Baresi and Giovanni Bosetti in Chiari, Italy. His parents were part of the circus Baresi (his mother's family), and they traveled a lot, so he was self-educated, especially in French. Originally trained as a circus and music-hall performer as a child, he was beloved for an act featuring trained geese. He also became known in his youth as "roi des casseurs d'assiettes," or "the king of the plate smashers," when he performed in Vaudeville beginning at age 10. He also worked as an acrobat for some of the most prestigious circuses in Europe.

== Career ==
Bosetti and André Deed were both hired from the circus in 1905 as stunt performers for the Pathé comedies, appearing in such films as Dix Femmes pour un Mari (Ten Women for One Husband). They presumably wore dresses to play two of ten women pursuing the same man. They were in other films such as La Course à la Perruque, Vot' permis!... and Viens l'chercher. Bosetti and Deed were known as specialists in the "chase film" (film-poursuite), and Bosetti became among the most famous comedians of his time.

He joined Gaumont in 1906, performing in La Course à la perruque (The Wig Chase) with Georges Hatot and André Heuzé. In 1908 he began working for the first woman film director, Alice Guy at Pathé Frères, eventually becoming director of its operation in Nice, France. In 1910 he formed two subsidiaries, Comica films and Nizza, but his service in World War I forced them to disband in 1914.

An example of his outrageous, physical, and even bawdy sense of humor is the 1907 film L'homme aimanté (The Magnetized Man) from Gaumont. This synopsis appears in an analysis of his style, resulting in what critic Lisa Trahair calls an "oddly self-exposing little film":

Bosetti’s film delineates the strange predicament of a man whose newly acquired attire results in all manner of objects suddenly becoming attracted to his person. It begins with two young reprobates of the Parisian streets hiding in wait behind a stationary carriage for someone to ambush. When our man enters the frame as a likely victim, they trip him, try to mug him and chase after him when he escapes. Catching his breath after eluding his assailants, the man is then squeezed from the opposite direction by two other much more menacing thugs. Escaping again and finding safe haven in his house, the man observes an ornamental suit of armour standing guard at his door and takes himself off to purchase a chain-mail vest. In the sequence that follows, the boy charged with delivering the item undertakes some charging of his own. Making a detour to a factory where his friend works, the boy unwraps the vest and lays it on the platform of a magnetising machine so that when our man takes to the streets under the protection of his new armature, the reaction he elicits is nothing short of an indiscriminate enthusiasm of the world of objects for his person. Covered in the flotsam of the world – shop signs, pieces of furniture, pots and pans – the man eventually visits the commissariat to report the strange nature of this latest assault. The préfet, seeing his gendarmes’ swords twittering nervously in the man’s presence, isolates the active quality of the object, and resolves the man’s problem by breaking its circuitry. Upon disrobing the complainant and sending him on his way, the préfet delights in demonstrating the operation of ‘the law’ to his subordinates by bouncing the vest in front of their swords so that they rise and fall in time with his bidding. Seizing on the resemblance of the swords’ movement to the erectile function, the insinuating condensation delights in the causal relation between actions and objects in the physical world by opening this world to two others: one of contagion and laughter, the other of a peculiarly cinematic metaphysics.

Bosetti uses what Trahair calls "symbolic erection[s}" quite clearly in other films as well, notably the 1908 Une dame vraiment bien (A very fine lady), where a woman promenades through Paris inspiring outrageous responses from men, and it includes a scene in which a man holding a water hose wields it phallically. There is no attempt at subtlety. Bosetti uses erotic humor in unapologetically sexualized ways that reflect a certain freedom in French cinema, one he likely would not have enjoyed either back in Italy, or in the United States and Canada.

Bosetti is more associated with France than Italy. He is credited for inspiring his colleague Louis Feuillade's 1913 film Fantômas, for which he served as producer, and he pioneered works in burlesque film years before Mack Sennett made it popular in the United States and Canada. He was also known for experiments with animation, such as animated furniture in the film Rosalie et ses meubles fidèles. Objects are also animated in the previously mentioned L'homme aimanté, and he was also a practitioner of early stop-motion animation. He had several nicknames in the industry, including "Romeo Cow-Boy," and the "father of French comedy," for creating some of the earliest films about the American Far West, and for making people laugh at such broad, risqué humor.

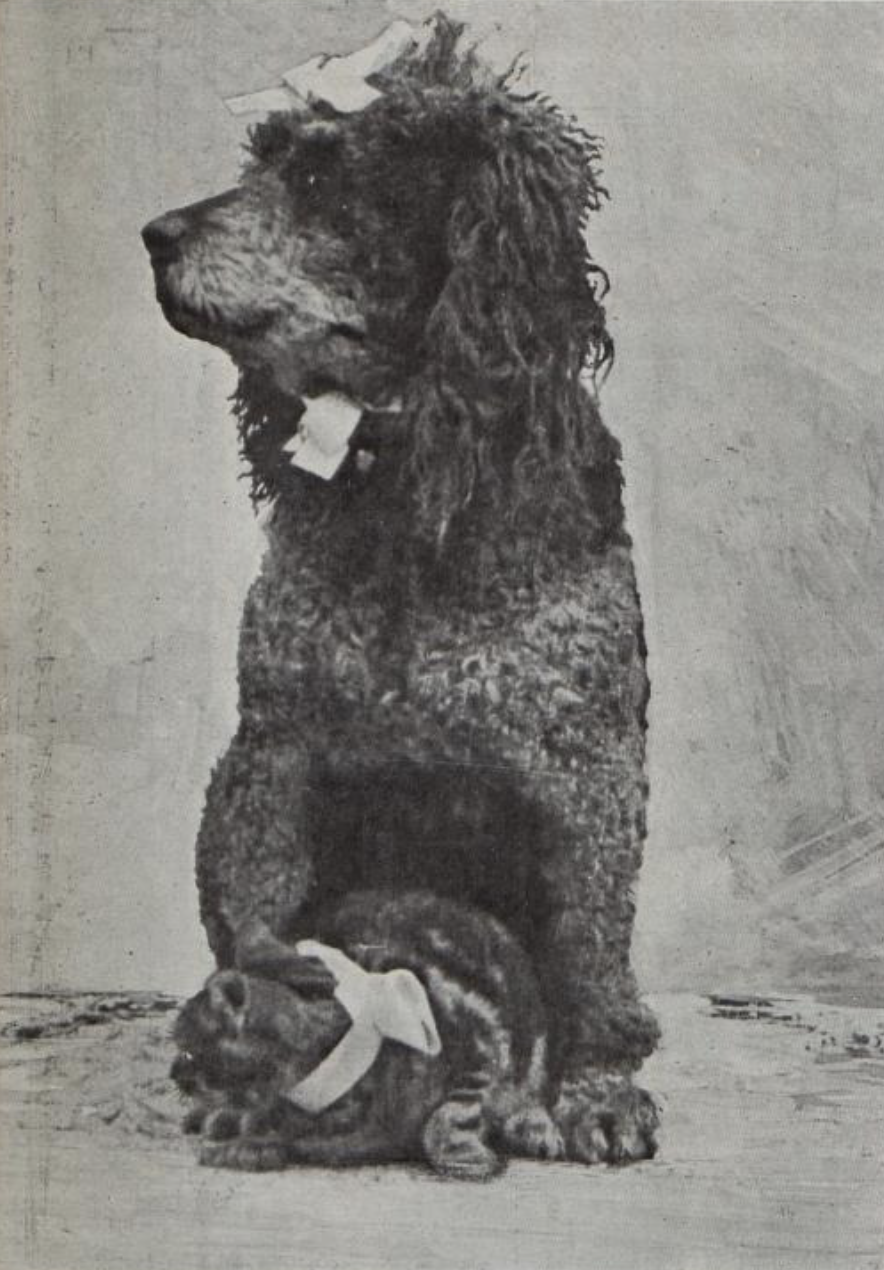
Barnum, a beloved dog featured in Bosetti's early films. Le Courrier Cinématographique ran two obituaries for Barnum in 1912.

== Personal life and death ==
Bosetti married Alice Hervat (1884-1926) on February 19, 1910, in Paris, when he was 31 and she was 25. The birth of a daughter, Juliette Alice (named for her maternal grandmother, but perhaps also as a jest with her father's name), was noted on March 9, 1913 by two of the top French cinema journals. Juliette died in 1972, at age 59. A brother, Alexis Lucien Bosetti, was born in 1905, and it is unclear whether he is the couple's son born five years before their marriage in Paris, Alice's child from a previous relationship, or their son from a 1903 marriage (reported in only one source) that may not have been official, and may have produced one more child.

Roméo Bosetti became a French citizen in 1913. He was seriously injured in WWI and ceased acting and directing, but continued to work in film as a producer. He died in 1948 in Suresnes, France, at the age of 69. His hometown of Chiari named a piazza near the municipal cinema and theater in his honor in 2024, inspired by journalist Guerino Lorini, who published a book about him. There is a plan to name a street in Rome for him as well, but it is still at the nomination stage.

== Trained animals ==
As noted above, one of his earliest famous acts with the circus used trained geese. He loved dogs and generally featured one or several in each film. His dog Barnum, a foundling from a traveling circus, was eulogized twice by Le Courrier Cinématographique when it died in June of 1912. About another dog, Médor, who also starred in films including an animal feature, less is known.
