= Himalia (film) =

2024 Canadian short film directed by Clara Milo and Juliette Lossky

- Directed by: Clara Milo; Juliette Lossky
- Written by: Clara Milo; Juliette Lossky
- Produced by: Catherine Boily; Rosalie Chicoine Perreault
- Starring: Noam Desbiens-Lépine
- Cinematography: Juliette Lossky
- Edited by: Philippe Lefebvre
- Music by: Wilhelm Brandl
- Production company: Metafilms
- Distributed by: Travelling Distribution
- Release date: October 12, 2024 (FNC)
- Running time: 21 minutes
- Country: Canada
- Language: Esperanto

Himalia is a Canadian short drama film, directed by Clara Milo and Juliette Lossky and released in 2024. A meditation on the role of the sun in the rhythm of human life, the film stars Noam Desbiens-Lépine as Elio, a young child whose fascination with the light leads him to follow a single beam of sunlight.

The cast also includes Amélie Clément, Adam Schneider, Pamela Sellers and Nicolas Viau.

The film premiered at the 2024 Festival du nouveau cinéma.

== Awards ==
Award	Date of ceremony	Category	Recipient	Result	Ref.
Canadian Society of Cinematographers	2025	Best Cinematography in a Dramatic Short	Juliette Lossky	Won	
Canadian Screen Awards	2026	Best Live Action Short Drama	Catherine Boily, Rosalie Chicoine Perreault, Clara Milo, Juliette Lossky	Nominated	
Canadian Screen Awards	2026	Best Performance in a Live Action Short Drama	Noam Desbiens-Lépine	Nominated	
Festival Plein(s) Écran(s)	2026	Grand Prix	Clara Milo, Juliette Lossky	Won	
Prix collégial du cinéma québécois	2025	Best Short Film	Clara Milo, Juliette Lossky	Nominated	
