= The Maiden (film) =

2022 Canadian drama film

- Directed by: Graham Foy
- Written by: Graham Foy
- Produced by: Daiva Žalnieriunas; Dan Montgomery
- Starring: Jackson Sluiter; Marcel T Jiménez; Hayley Ness
- Cinematography: Kelly Jeffrey
- Edited by: Brendan Mills
- Production companies: F F Films; MDFF
- Release date: September 1, 2022 (Venice)
- Running time: 117 minutes
- Country: Canada
- Language: English

The Maiden is a 2022 Canadian drama film, written and directed by Graham Foy. The film stars Marcel T. Jiménez as Colton, a teenager coping with his grief after the death of his friend Kyle (Jackson Sluiter) in an accident, and Hayley Ness as Whitney, a classmate of theirs whose journal Colton finds in the ravine where Kyle died.

The film was included in the Next Step incubator program for emerging filmmakers at the 2022 Cannes Film Festival, and in the First Cut+ program at the 2022 Karlovy Vary Film Festival. At Karlovy Vary, it won the €5,000 First Cut+ TRT Award.

It had its world premiere in the Giornate degli Autori program at the 2022 Venice International Film Festival, on September 1, 2022, and its North American premiere in the Contemporary World Cinema lineup at the 2022 Toronto International Film Festival. The film was later shown at the Pittsburgh Contemporary Film Fest in April 2025.

== Critical response ==
Andrew Parker of TheGATE.ca praised the film, writing that "The Maiden belongs to a long Canadian tradition of cinematic tales revolving around young people growing up, forming close bonds, and together learning about the sometimes shocking nature of the world they’re going to inherit as adults. But Foy’s take on such a well sown field looks at such narratives from a refreshingly microcosmic perspective. While major events forever alters the lives of these characters, The Maiden finds more beauty in the small details that lie before and beyond. Foy displays an acute understanding that sometimes the greatest meaning and emotional resonance comes from memories others might find fleeting."

For Exclaim!, Rachel Ho wrote that "Foy manages to push the film toward the supernatural without becoming a ghost story — just as he was able to push the film towards a coming-of-age story without actually existing on that plane. Throughout the film, he engages in this tightrope balancing act and somehow never falls off. His storytelling evokes Apichatpong Weerasethakul's ambiguous and grounded surrealist nature, while his filmmaking has a Malickian quality. Combined together, Foy's ambitious and bold debut becomes a dream-like rumination on youth, loss and friendship that is familiar and singular at the same time."

Barry Hertz of The Globe and Mail praised the film, writing that it "initially plays out like an episode of Jackass trapped in the dreamy haze of a Terrence Malick film", and concluding that "confident and inventive, ambitious and controlled, Foy’s film balances all its elements with such a sense of purpose that it’s all a little intimidating, up to and including the wonderful performances from first-time actors Jimenez, Sluiter and Ness. (There is also a fun little cameo from a cat who may be the best feline onscreen this year, Puss in Boots aside.) I can only hope, then, that The Maiden’s many microbudget wonders make as much of an impression on curious, adventurous audiences as the mark that Colton and Kyle leave on that aforementioned bridge. Tag your friends, and let’s make Graham Foy a household name."

== Awards ==
At Venice, the film won the Cinema of the Future award. At the 2022 Festival du nouveau cinéma, it was named the winner of the National Competition.

The film was nominated for the John Dunning Best First Feature Award at the 11th Canadian Screen Awards in 2023.
