= Juliette Lossky =

Juliette Lossky is a Canadian filmmaker from Quebec, most noted as co-director with Clara Milo of the 2024 short film Himalia.

She has also worked as a cinematographer, most notably on the 2022 short film No Ghost in the Morgue.

== Filmography ==
- No Ghost in the Morgue - 2022, cinematographer
- Himalia - 2024, director and cinematographer
- Still Night, Burning House - 2026, cinematographer

== Awards ==
| Award | Date of ceremony | Category | Work | Result | Ref. |
|---|---|---|---|---|---|
| American Society of Cinematographers | 2025 | Music Video Award | Stacey Subero, "Altamaha-ha" | Nominated | |
| Canadian Screen Awards | 2026 | Best Live Action Short Drama | Himalia with Catherine Boily, Rosalie Chicoine Perreault, Clara Milo | Nominated | |
| Festival Plein(s) Écran(s) | 2026 | Grand Prix | Himalia with Clara Milo | Won | |
| Prix collégial du cinéma québécois | 2025 | Best Short Film | Himalia with Clara Milo | Nominated | |
