= Nanitic (film) =

2022 Canadian short film directed by Carol Nguyen

- Directed by: Carol Nguyen
- Written by: Carol Nguyen
- Produced by: Marie Lytwyknuk; Carol Nguyen
- Starring: Kylie Le; Ly Pham; Nhu Van Pham
- Cinematography: Alexandre Nour-Desjardins
- Edited by: Carol Nguyen
- Music by: Arie Verheul van de Ven
- Distributed by: Travelling Distribution
- Release date: September 8, 2022 (TIFF)
- Running time: 14 minutes
- Country: Canada
- Languages: English; Vietnamese

Nanitic is a 2022 Canadian short drama film written, directed, produced, and edited by Carol Nguyen. It stars Kylie Le, Ly Pham, and Nhu Van Pham, and follows a young Vietnamese-Canadian girl who observes as her terminally ill grandmother is taken care of by her aunt.

The film premiered at the 2022 Toronto International Film Festival, where it was named the winner of the Share Her Journey award. The film was named to TIFF's annual year-end Canada's Top Ten list for 2022. It was a Prix Iris nominee for Best Live Action Short Film at the 25th Quebec Cinema Awards in 2023.

The title of the short film comes from nanitics, which are the first generation of worker ants and shoulder the responsibility of taking care of the colony. As a queen ant's death also means the death of the entire colony, the Vietnamese-Canadian family in Nanitic are concerned for what will happen to them in the future when their matriarch finally dies.

The short film is available to watch on the director's official Vimeo channel.

== Plot ==
Vietnamese-Canadian cousins Trang and Mai regularly visit their terminally ill grandmother's house, where they play and secretly keep an ant colony in jars hidden in their Aunt Út's closet. Út herself gets easily annoyed whenever her nieces get into trouble as she is stressed from tending to her mother, who no longer responds and now lies in bed every day in the living room and has a care worker. One day, Trang and Mai discover that their ants' queen has died. After Mai's father takes her home, Út has Trang look after their matriarch while she takes a shower. Trang gets scared when her grandmother begins coughing and calls her aunt for help; the crisis is averted when Út gives her mother some cough medicine. When it is time for Trang to go home, her Aunt Út has discovered the pet ants and makes her niece discard them, reminding her that the insects have their own homes. As Trang leaves, the film ends with her aunt sitting beside their matriarch and praying for her.

== Cast and characters ==
- Kylie Le as Trang
- Nhu Van Pham as Mai
- Ly Pham as Aunt Út
- Dam Nguyen as Grandma
- Eve Sévigny as Care Worker
- Fred Nguyen as Uncle
- An Nguyen as Ma
