= Carol Nguyen =

Vietnamese Canadian film director and producer

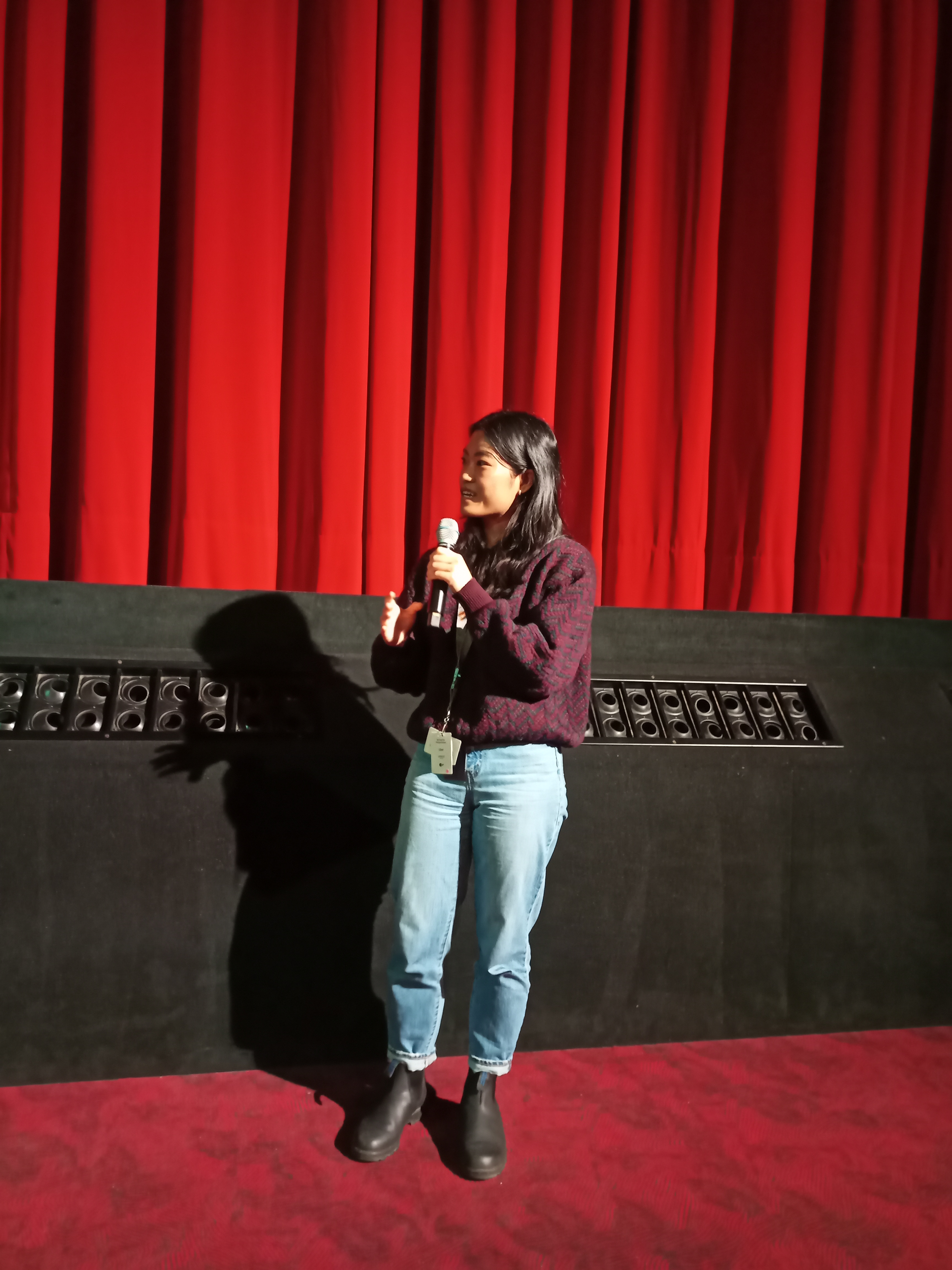
Nguyen at 2023 Berlinale

Carol Nguyen is a Vietnamese Canadian filmmaker. She is most noted for her films No Crying at the Dinner Table, which was a Canadian Screen Award nominee for Best Short Documentary at the 8th Canadian Screen Awards in 2020, and Nanitic, which won the Share Her Journey award at the 2022 Toronto International Film Festival.

She was named the winner of the $10,000 Toronto Film Critics Association's Jay Scott Prize for emerging filmmakers at the Toronto Film Critics Association Awards 2022.

She is a graduate of Concordia University's Mel Hoppenheim School of Cinema.

Still Night, Burning House, her feature directorial debut, is slated to premiere in the TIFF Docs program at the 2026 Toronto International Film Festival.

== Filmography ==
- This Home Is Not Empty – 2015
- Façade – 2016
- Every Grain of Rice – 2017
- No Crying at the Dinner Table – 2019
- Nanitic – 2022
- Still Night, Burning House - 2026
