= Simo (film) =

2022 Canadian-American short film directed by Aziz Zoromba

- Directed by: Aziz Zoromba
- Written by: Aziz Zoromba
- Produced by: Rosalie Chicoine Perreault
- Starring: Basel El Rayes; Seif El Rayes; Aladeen Tawfeek
- Cinematography: Alexandre Nour Desjardins
- Edited by: Omar Elhamy; Aziz Zoromba
- Music by: Ilyaa Ghafouri
- Distributed by: H264 Distribution
- Release date: September 13, 2022 (TIFF)
- Running time: 23 minutes
- Country: Canada
- Languages: Arabic; French

Simo is a 2022 Canadian short drama film, written, directed, and co-edited by Aziz Zoromba. The film stars Basel El Rayes and Seif El Rayes as Simo and Emad, two brothers whose competitive rivalry leads to a dangerous situation when Simo sneakily tries to take over Emad's online gaming channel.

The film premiered at the 2022 Toronto International Film Festival, where it was named the winner of the Best Canadian Short Film award.

The film was named to TIFF's annual year-end Canada's Top Ten list for 2022. It was shortlisted for the Prix collégial du cinéma québécois in 2023, and won the Canadian Screen Award for Best Live Action Short Drama at the 11th Canadian Screen Awards in 2023.

It was a Prix Iris nominee for Best Live Action Short Film at the 25th Quebec Cinema Awards in 2023.
