= Aziz Zoromba =

Canadian film director

Aziz Zoromba is an Egyptian film director from Montreal, Quebec. He is most noted for his short film Simo, which was the winner of the Best Canadian Short Film award at the 2022 Toronto International Film Festival and the Canadian Screen Award for Best Live Action Short Drama at the 11th Canadian Screen Awards.

He previously directed the short film Faraway (2020), and was a producer of Carol Nguyen's short documentary film No Crying at the Dinner Table.
