= III (film) =

2022 Canadian short drama film

- Directed by: Salomé Villeneuve
- Written by: Salomé Villeneuve
- Produced by: Catherine Boily; Rosalie Chicoine Perreault
- Starring: Eliott Desjardins Gauthier; Alex Dupras; Anne Florence Lavigne-Desjardins
- Cinematography: Fred Gervais
- Edited by: Salomé Villeneuve
- Production company: Metafilms
- Release date: September 8, 2022 (Venice)
- Running time: 12 minutes
- Country: Canada
- Language: French

III is a 2022 Canadian drama short film written and directed by Salomé Villeneuve. Partially inspired by her own childhood relationship with her brothers, the film centres on Saul (Eliott Desjardins Gauthier), Éli (Alex Dupras) and Lila (Anne Florence Lavigne-Desjardins), three young siblings who are spending a hot summer day at the lake.

The film premiered at the 2022 Venice Film Festival.

The film was a Canadian Screen Award nominee for Best Live Action Short Drama at the 11th Canadian Screen Awards.
