= Justine Martin =

Canadian documentary filmmaker

Justine Martin (born 1999) is a Canadian documentary filmmaker from Montreal, Quebec. She is most noted for her 2022 short documentary film Oasis, which was the winner of the Prix collégial du cinéma québécois in the short films category in 2023.

The film was also a Prix Iris nominee for Best Short Documentary at the 25th Quebec Cinema Awards in 2023, and a Canadian Screen Award nominee for Best Short Documentary at the 12th Canadian Screen Awards in 2024.

She is a graduate of the film studies program at Concordia University. Oasis was her debut film as a director, although she has also had production and camera credits on other short films.
