= Salomé Villeneuve =

Canadian film director

Salomé Villeneuve is a Canadian film director and screenwriter. She is most noted for her short film III, which was a Canadian Screen Award nominee for Best Live Action Short Drama at the 11th Canadian Screen Awards.

The daughter of film director Denis Villeneuve, she studied filmmaking at Concordia University's Mel Hoppenheim School of Cinema. She has stated that her father's career, and the heavy exposure to the world of film that she received in childhood due to his passion for cinema, influenced her desire to become a filmmaker.

She made a number of student films, and had film crew roles including on the costume team for her father's film Arrival, before releasing III in 2022, as her first commercial release. The film premiered at the 2022 Venice Film Festival, the only Canadian film to screen at Venice that year. She and cinematographer Kristof Brandl later co-led a small experimental "psychedelic unit" on her father's Dune: Part Three.
