= DGC Award for Best Short Film =

Award from the Directors Guild of Canada

The DGC Award for Best Short Film is an annual Canadian award, presented by the Directors Guild of Canada to honour the year's best Canadian short films.

== Winners and nominees ==
=== 2010s ===
Year	Film	Director	Ref
2010
2010	Quiet at Dawn	Rob Blackie	
2010	The Familiar	Kody Zimmermann	
2010	Remote	Marc Roussel	
2010	Serum 1831	Anand Kanna	
2011
2011	Taxi Libre	Kaveh Nabatian	
2011	Little Larry	Jill Carter	
2011	She Said Lenny	Jim Donovan	
2011	The Waking	John Stead	
2012
2012	Patch Town	Craig Goodwill	
2012	Dave vs. Death	Patrick Hagarty	
2012	The Seder	Justin Kelly	
2012	Training Wheels	Ravi Steve	
2013
2013	The Sound of Willie Nelson's Guitar	Chris Cinnamon	
2013	Frost	Jeremy Ball	
2013	How to Keep Your Day Job	Sean Frewer	
2013	The Sweetest Hippopotamus	Marc Roussel	
2014
2014	The Golden Ticket	Patrick Hagarty	
2014	Out	Jeremy LaLonde	
2014	The Portal	Jonathan Williams	
2014	Whispers of Life	Florian Halbedl	
2015
2015	Made in Bali	Michael Pohorly	
2015	The Day Santa Didn't Come	Ryan Keller	
2015	The Underground	Michelle Latimer	
2015	Vox	Stephen Reynolds	
2016
2016	Portal to Hell!	Vivieno Caldinelli	
2016	Big Little Girl	Viki Posidis	
2016	Friends Like Us	Craig David Wallace	
2016	The Offer	Winnifred Jong	
2017
2017	Gatekeeper	Yung Chang	
2017	Tuesday, 10:08am	Jane Tattersall, Thomas Pepper	
2017	Motherland	Jason Hreno	
2017	Victory Square	Jacquie Gould	
2018
2018	Post No Bills	Robin Hays	
2018	The Beep Test (La Course navette)	Maxime Aubert	
2018	Escape (Évasion)	Anjali Nayar	
2018	Shadow Nettes	Phillip Barker	
2019
2019	I Beat Up My Rapist	Katrina Saville	
2019	Hot Flash	Thea Hollatz	
2019	Kitty's Naughty Knickers	Caitlyn Sponheimer	
2019	The Story of Pema	Martin Buzora	
2019	With Me	Weyni Mengesha	

=== 2020s ===
Year	Film	Director	Ref
2020
2020	Sing Me a Lullaby	Tiffany Hsiung	
2020	Jesse Jams	Trevor Anderson	
2020	A Simple Fucking Gesture	Jesse Shamata	
2020	Take Me to Prom	Andrew Moir	
2020	Teething	Glen Matthews	
2021
2021	Ingredients	Hannah Michielsen	
2021	Georgeena	Weyni Mengesha	
2021	Moon (Lune)	Zoé Pelchat	
2021	On Falling	Josephine Anderson	
2021	You Will Still Be Here Tomorrow	Michael Hanley	
2022
2022	Send the Rain	Hayley Gray	
2022	Him & Her	Simonee Chichester	
2022	Lover Boy's Little Dream	Ritvick Mehra	
2022	Moore's Void	Brad Bangsboll	
2022	Omi	Kelly Fyffe-Marshall	
2022	Patty vs. Patty	Chris Strikes	
2023
2023	SmokeBreak	Lisa Robertson	
2023	Aftercare	Anubha Momin	
2023	For Her	Mostafa Keshvari	
2023	Redlights	Eva Thomas	
2023	T-Minus	Emily Lerer	
2023	Woman Meets Girl	Murry Peeters	
2024
2024	I Was Here	Alyson Richards	
2024	Bloodline	Richard Rotter	
2024	Cash Cows	Shubham Chhabra	
2024	Cold	Liz Whitmere	
2024	EarthWorm	Phillip Barker	
2025
2025	On a Sunday at Eleven	Alicia K. Harris	
2025	Dish Pit	Anna Hopkins	
2025	Hatch	Alireza Kazemipour, Panta Mosleh	
2025	Headcase	Spencer Zimmerman	
2025	Who Loves the Sun	Arshia Shakiba	
2026
2026	The Muse	Wanda Nolan	
2026	Light Through the Blindfold	Alireza Kazemipour	
2026	Never Use Alone	Colin Matthews	
2026	Petra's Lasso (El lazo de Petra)	Gigi Saul Guerrero	
2026	Undelivered	David Lester	
