= Asinnajaq =

Inuk Canadian artist and filmmaker (b. 1991)

asinnajaq
- Born: Isabella Rose Rowan-Weetaluktuk; 1991; Kuujjuaq, Nunavik
- Citizenship: Inukjuamiut and Canadian
- Education: Freda Diesing School of Northwest Coast Art, Nova Scotia College of Art and Design
- Known for: visual artist, writer, filmmaker, and curator
- Awards: Sobey Award (2020)
- Website: https://www.lichenolichen.ca/

asinnajaq (born 1991) is a Canadian Inuk visual artist, writer, filmmaker, and curator, from Inukjuak, Quebec. She is most noted for her 2017 film Three Thousand, which received a Canadian Screen Award nomination for Best Short Documentary Film at the 6th Canadian Screen Awards. In 2025, a selection of her photographs were displayed at the National Gallery of Canada after she won the 2024 New Generation Photography Award.

She has also been active as a curator of Inuit art and video projects, including the Canadian pavilion at the 58th Venice Biennale and the Inuit Art Centre at the Winnipeg Art Gallery.

== Early life and education ==
Isabella Rose Rowan-Weetaluktuk was born in Kuujjuaq, Nunavik in 1991. She completed Bachelor of Fine Arts at Freda Diesing School of Northwest Coast Art in 2015, before completing an MFA film at the Nova Scotia College of Art and Design in Halifax. The name asinnajaq is a family name that means "nomadic outlier" in the local Inuktitut dialect. Her mother, Carol Rowan, is a university professor, while her father, Jobie Weetaluktuk, is a filmmaker. Early in her artistic career she assisted her father while he worked on Timuti (2012), a short film based in Inukjuak, the home of their extended family.

== Personal life ==
asinnajaq is currently based out of Montreal, Quebec. She is the niece of Daniel Weetaluktuk, the first Inuk archeologist in Canada, who is the subject of her upcoming short film Daniel.

She is a member of the queer community.

== Career ==
Through her artistic work, asinnajaq draws her inspiration from the notion of respect for human rights, and the desire to explore her Inuit heritage. Her practice is grounded in research and collaboration. Her short film Upinnaqusittik, made in 2016, premiered at iNuit Blanche, the first ever circumpolar arts festival in St. John's. She directed her award-winning short film Three Thousand in 2017 while working for the National Film Board and drew on their archival film collection for portions of the film's contents.

=== Curatorial practice ===
Alongside her artistic work, asinnajaq has led multiple Inuit culture workshops at the McCord Museum with her mother Carol Rowan. In 2018, she co-created ᑎᓪᓕᑕᕐᓃᑦ Tilliraniit a three-day film festival celebrating Inuit art presented at FOFA Gallery in Montréal. She was part of the curatorial teams for the Canadian Pavilion at the 2019 Venice Biennale and joined group of other female curators during the opening of the Inuit Art Centre, Qaumajuq, at Winnipeg Art Gallery in 2020.

In 2020 asinnajaq received a Sobey Art Award for the entire body of her artistic work.

In 2024, she became the guest curator for the exhibition ᐆᒻᒪᖁᑎᒃ uummaqutik: essence of life at the Montreal Museum of Fine Arts, presenting selections from the museum's collection of Inuit art. That same year, she won the 2024 New Generation Photography Award and had her photographic work displayed in the National Gallery of Canada.

=== Residencies ===
- daphne art center (2022)

=== Exhibitions ===
==== Curated exhibits ====
- ᐆᒻᒪᖁᑎᒃ uummaqutik: essence of life, Montreal Museum of Fine Arts, Montreal, Canada, 8 November (2024)
- With the Seasons ᓯᓚᐅᑉ ᐊᓯᑦᔨᑕᕐᓂᖓᑕ ᐃᓗᐊᓂ, Visual Arts Centre, Westmount, Canada, 6–28 May (2022)
- INUA, Winnipeg Art Gallery, Qaumajuq, Winnipeg, Canada, Mar 26, 2021 - Feb 12, 2023

==== Solo exhibits ====
- ivaluit / sinews / tendons, daphne art centre, Montreal, Canada, March 9 – April 16 (2022) - curator

==== Group exhibits ====
- The Structure of Smoke, Morris and Helen Belkin Art Gallery, Vancouver, Canada (2026)
- 2024 New Generation Photography Award, National Gallery of Canada, Ottawa, Canada, 14 February - 1 June (2025)
- femmes volcans forêts torrents, Museum of Contemporary Art, Montreal, Canada, 11 April - 18 August (2024)
- Indian Theater: Native Performance, Art, and Self-Determination since 1969, Hessel Museum of Art, New York, USA, 24 June – 26 November (2023)
- We Are Story: The Canada Now Photography Acquisition, Art Gallery of Ontario, Toronto, Canada, January 28 - July 23 (2023)
- ᐊᖏᕐᕋᒧᑦ / Ruovttu Guvlui / Towards Home, Canadian Center for Architecture, Montreal, Quebec, 1 June (2022) to 26 March (2023)
- Réclamer la terre, Palais de Tokyo, Paris, France, 15 April - 4 September (2022)
- One if by Land, Two if by Sea, Kunsthal Charlottenborg, Copenhagen, Denmark, 23 March - 7 August (2022)
- When Veins Meet Like Rivers; ᑲᑎᓐᓂᖅ / okhížata / maadawaan, Plug In Institute of Contemporary Art, Winnipeg, Canada, 21 August - 17 December (2021)
- The Wildflower, Hafnarborg, Hafnarfjörður, Iceland 29 August - 8 November (2020)
- Holding on to Universes, Centre for Contemporary Arts, Glasgow, Scotland, 7 February - 22 March (2020)
- Of Myths and Mountains, The Rooms, St. John's, Canada, 25 January - 12 April (2020)
- May the Land Remember You As You Walk Upon Its Surface, Manitoba Craft Council, Winnipeg, Canada, 10 January - 29 February (2020)
- ᐊᕙᑖᓂᑦ ᑕᒪᐃᓐᓂᑦ ᓄᓇᑐᐃᓐᓇᓂᑦ Among All these Tundras, Leonard & Bina Ellen Gallery, Winnipeg, Canada, September 18 - December 7 (2019)
- Kaporangi Kiriata: CineMarae, The Arts House Trust, Auckland, New Zealand, 26 June – 22 July (2018)
- INSURGENCE/RESURGENCE, Winnipeg Art Gallery, Winnipeg, Canada, 22 September (2017) - 18 April (2018)

== Filmography ==
=== Short film ===
Year	Title	Director	Writer	Assistant Director
2012	Timuti	No	No	Yes
2015	Rowan	No	Yes	No
2015	Salt Stains	No	No	Yes
2016	Upinnaqusittik (Lucky)	Yes	Yes	No
2017	Three Thousand	Yes	Yes	No
In production	Daniel	Yes	Yes	No

=== Television ===
Year	Title	Role	Episode(s)
2020-2023	Amplify	Director	Directed 2 episodes

=== Other work ===
==== Acting roles ====
Year	Title	Role	Notes
2013	Our Ottawa	Self	Short local TV series
2015	Rowan	Rowan (main role)	Thesis film from NSCAD
2024	Universal Language	Knitter	

==== Mentorship and cultural consultation ====
Year	Title	Role(s)	Notes
2017	Shaman	Cultural script consultant, mentor, trainer	Short film
2021	Evan's Drum	Mentor	Short film
2021	Nalujuk Night	Mentor	Short film
2023	Hebron Relocation	Mentor	Short film
2023	Miss Campbell: Inuk Teacher	Mentor	Short film

== Awards and nominations ==
Year	Nominated Work(s)	Award	Won	Festival/Institution	Location
2025	All works	Pierre-Ayot Award	Yes	Contemporary Art Galleries Association (AGAC), Ville de Montréal	Canada
2024	Photography series	2024 New Generation Photography Award	Yes	National Gallery of Canada	Canada
2020	All works	Sobey Art Award	Yes	The Sobey Art Foundation	Canada
2019	Three Thousand	"Ô Canada — Québec, Premières Nations, etc." Program	Yes	Festival international du court métrage	France
2018	Three Thousand	Best Short Documentary	No	Canadian Screen Awards	Canada
2018	Three Thousand	Best Indigenous Short Film Award	Yes	Skábmagovat Film Festival	Finland
2018	Three Thousand	International Indigenous Award	Yes	Wairoa Maori Film Festival	New Zealand-Aotearoa
2017	Three Thousand	Imagine Native Film and Kent Monkman Award for Best Exposition	Yes	Media Arts Festival	Canada
2017	All works	REVEAL Indigenous Art Award	Yes	The Hnatyshyn Foundation	Canada
