= Annette Clarke (producer) =

Canadian film producer

Annette Clarke is a Canadian producer of documentary and animated films, who served as executive producer of the National Film Board of Canada's Quebec and Atlantic studio from 2003 to 2021.

Clarke first joined the NFB's Newfoundland office in 1987, moving to Montreal two years later to work with the Studio D unit for women filmmakers. She left the NFB in 1997 to launch her own studio, Ruby Line Productions, before returning to the NFB in 2003.

== Filmography ==
=== Producer ===
- When Women Kill – 1994
- Democracy à la Maude – 1998
- White Thunder – 2002
- Cottonland – 2006
- Heads Up! – 2006
- The Sparky Book – 2006
- Becoming 13 – 2006
- Race Is a Four-Letter Word – 2006
- Inside Time – 2007
- Hannah's Story – 2007
- Good Morning Kandahar – 2007
- Griefwalker – 2008
- Little Thunder – 2009
- Vive la rose – 2009
- Four Feet Up – 2009
- Red Ochre – 2009
- Flawed – 2009
- Waseteg – 2010
- The Chocolate Farmer – 2011
- Hard Light – 2011
- The Boxing Girls of Kabul – 2011
- Imaginary Heroine – 2012
- Buying Sex – 2012
- Impromptu – 2013
- Mary & Myself – 2013
- Song for Cuba – 2014
- Marijina epizoda – 2014
- 54 Hours – 2014
- Danny – 2014
- Gun Runners – 2015
- Hand.Line.God – 2016
- Theatre of Life – 2016
- Bluefin – 2016
- The Mystery of the Secret Room – 2016
- Reel East Coast – 2017
- Love, Scott – 2018
- Assholes: A Theory – 2019
- River Silence – 2019
- Becoming Labrador – 2019
- Wintopia – 2019
- 4 North A – 2020
- How to Be At Home – 2020
- Dear Audrey – 2021
- The Storm – 2021
- Seguridad – 2024
- A Quiet Girl – 2024

=== Executive producer ===
- Hi-Ho Mistahey! – 2012
- Island Green – 2013
- Bad Coyote – 2013
- Song for Cuba – 2014
- Trick or Treaty? – 2014
- 54 Hours – 2014
- Danny – 2014
- Gun Runners – 2015
- The Singing Lumberjack – 2015
- Hand.Line.God – 2016
- We Can't Make the Same Mistake Twice – 2016
- Bluefin – 2016
- The Mystery of the Secret Room – 2016
- Love, Scott – 2018
- 1999 – 2018
- Solo: A Portrait of Angela Hewitt – 2018
- Rick Mercer: 'Take Action' Figures – 2019
- Radical – 2019
- Becoming Labrador – 2019
- Jordan River Anderson, the Messenger – 2019
- Ice Breakers – 2019
- The Forbidden Reel – 2019
- Gun Killers – 2019
- 4 North A – 2020
- Saturday Night – 2021
- Nalujuk Night – 2021
- Dear Audrey – 2021
- The Storm – 2021
- Bill Reid Remembers – 2022

== Awards ==
Award	Category	Year	Work	Result	Ref(s)
Gemini Awards	Best History Documentary Program	2002	White Thunder	Nominated	
Gemini Awards	Donald Brittain Award	2007	Cottonland	Nominated	
Gemini Awards	Best Children's or Youth Non-Fiction Program or Series	2008	Heads Up!	Nominated	
Genie Awards	Best Animated Short	2010	Vive la rose	Nominated	
Canadian Screen Awards	Best Animated Short	2014	Impromptu	Nominated	
Canadian Screen Awards	Best Animated Short	2021	4 North A	Nominated	
Canadian Screen Awards	Best Feature Length Documentary	2021	The Forbidden Reel	Nominated	
Canadian Screen Awards	Best Feature Length Documentary	2023	Dear Audrey	Nominated	
Canadian Screen Awards	Best Short Documentary	2013	The Boxing Girls of Kabul	Won	
Canadian Screen Awards	Best Short Documentary	2014	Mary & Myself	Nominated	
Canadian Screen Awards	Best Short Documentary	2020	Gun Killers	Nominated	
Canadian Screen Awards	Best Short Documentary	2022	Nalujuk Night	Won	
Canadian Screen Awards	Best Short Documentary	2023	Bill Reid Remembers	Nominated	
Canadian Screen Awards	Best Short Documentary	2023	Perfecting the Art of Longing	Nominated	
Canadian Screen Awards	Donald Brittain Award	2016	Danny	Nominated	
Canadian Screen Awards	Donald Brittain Award	2021	Assholes: A Theory	Nominated	
Prix Iris	Best Documentary Film	2021	Wintopia	Nominated	
