= Nalujuk Night =

Inuit festival

- Nickname: Jannies' Night
- Date: 6 January
- Frequency: Annually
- Locations: Nunatsiavut, Canada
- Major events: Dressing up as Nalujuit; Singing; Rewarding good behaviour Punishing bad behaviour

Nalujuk Night is a festival marked by Inuit communities in Nunatsiavut on 6 January to commemorate the end of Christmas. Believed to derive from a combination of Inuit religious traditions and Christianity brought to the area by Moravians in the 18th century, older members of communities dress up as Nalujuit (sing. Nalujuk), beings that emerge from the sea ice to reward good behaviour and punish bad behaviour.

== Etymology ==
The term "nalujuk" comes from the Inuktiut term for "heathen" and "non-believer" and has been used as a term to describe people who are ignorant or uninformed. Its plural form, nalujuit, was also used to described Christian mummers operating in Labrador following the arrival of Moravians. Among non-indigenous communities, the celebration is sometimes referred to as Jannies' Night.

== Folklore ==
Nalujuk Night is believed to have started during the eighteenth century, following the arrival of Moravians in Labrador. Oral traditions state that the Nalujuit represent the three wise men who visited Jesus following his birth; it has been theorised that this story merged with the Inuit story of Suporgoksoak, a spirit who controlled wildlife and determined if people were worthy of receiving its bounty, as well as elements of the story of the water deity Sedna. Nalujuit have been compared to bogeymen in other cultures. Parents will often threaten their children that Nalujuit will "get them" on 6 January if they do not behave during the year.

Nalujuk Night was believed to have first occurred in Hebron, a settlement that has since been disbanded. It occurs in at least three villages in Nunatsiavut, including Nain and Makkovik.

== Customs ==
Nalujuk Night occurs on 6 January and marks the end of the Twelve Days of Christmas. Older community members will dress up as Nalujuit, primarily dressing in animals furs such as caribou, wearing seal skin boots and a mask ordinarily made from animal skin or cloth, but sometimes masks are purchased directly from shops. The masks are often animalistic or skeletal in appearance. Nalujuit will walk into communities, supposedly having crossed the sea ice from Greenland, in order to judge the behaviour of children.

The responses of Nalujuit to children can vary. Some communities hold gatherings where children will come to shake hands with the Nalujuit and where Nalujuit wills either provide sweets for good behaviour, or otherwise chase and hit children with a staff (although some oral histories report other items being used, including a gun, chains and a harpoon) if they are deemed to have behaved badly over the previous year. If children are caught, they can try to appease the Nalujuk by singing a song or a hymn, traditionally "Surotsit Katitse".

This pattern is broadly consistent, though in some areas, Nalujuit visit children's homes in order to deliver gifts. Some will ask the children "piuju kattaven?" (lit. 'did you do good?'), to which the traditional response is "piuju kattaget!" (lit. 'do good!'). Children are expected to sing a song in Inuktitut before the Nalujuk leaves the house, often leaving behind sweets. In communities where Nalujuit do not visit homes, children will leave out a stocking that is traditionally filled by a Nalujuk with sweets if the child has been good.

At the end of Nalujuk Night, the Nalujuit leave the community, supposedly returning to the sea ice, marking the end of the festive period in Nunatsiavut.

== In the media ==
The short film Nalujuk Night, directed by Jennie Williams, details the Nalujuk Night celebrations in Nain. It won the Canadian Screen Award for Best Short Documentary.
