= The Muse (2025 film) =

- Directed by: Wanda Nolan
- Written by: Wanda Nolan
- Produced by: Liz Cowie; Rohan Fernando
- Starring: Ting Ting Chen; Robert Tilley
- Cinematography: Stéphanie Weber Biron
- Edited by: Andrew MacCormack
- Music by: Sarah Harris
- Production company: National Film Board of Canada
- Release date: September 14, 2025 (AIFF)
- Running time: 18 minutes
- Country: Canada
- Language: English

The Muse is a Canadian short documentary film, directed by Wanda Nolan and released in 2025. The film documents the friendship and creative partnership that develops between Ting Ting Chen, a photographer, and Robert Tilley, a senior citizen who agrees to accompany her on a road trip across Newfoundland.

The film premiered at the 2025 Atlantic International Film Festival, where it won the award for Best Atlantic Short Documentary.

The film won the Canadian Screen Award for Best Short Documentary at the 14th Canadian Screen Awards in 2026, and the DGC Award for Best Short Film at the 2026 Directors Guild of Canada awards.
