= Jamaican patty =

Type of pastry

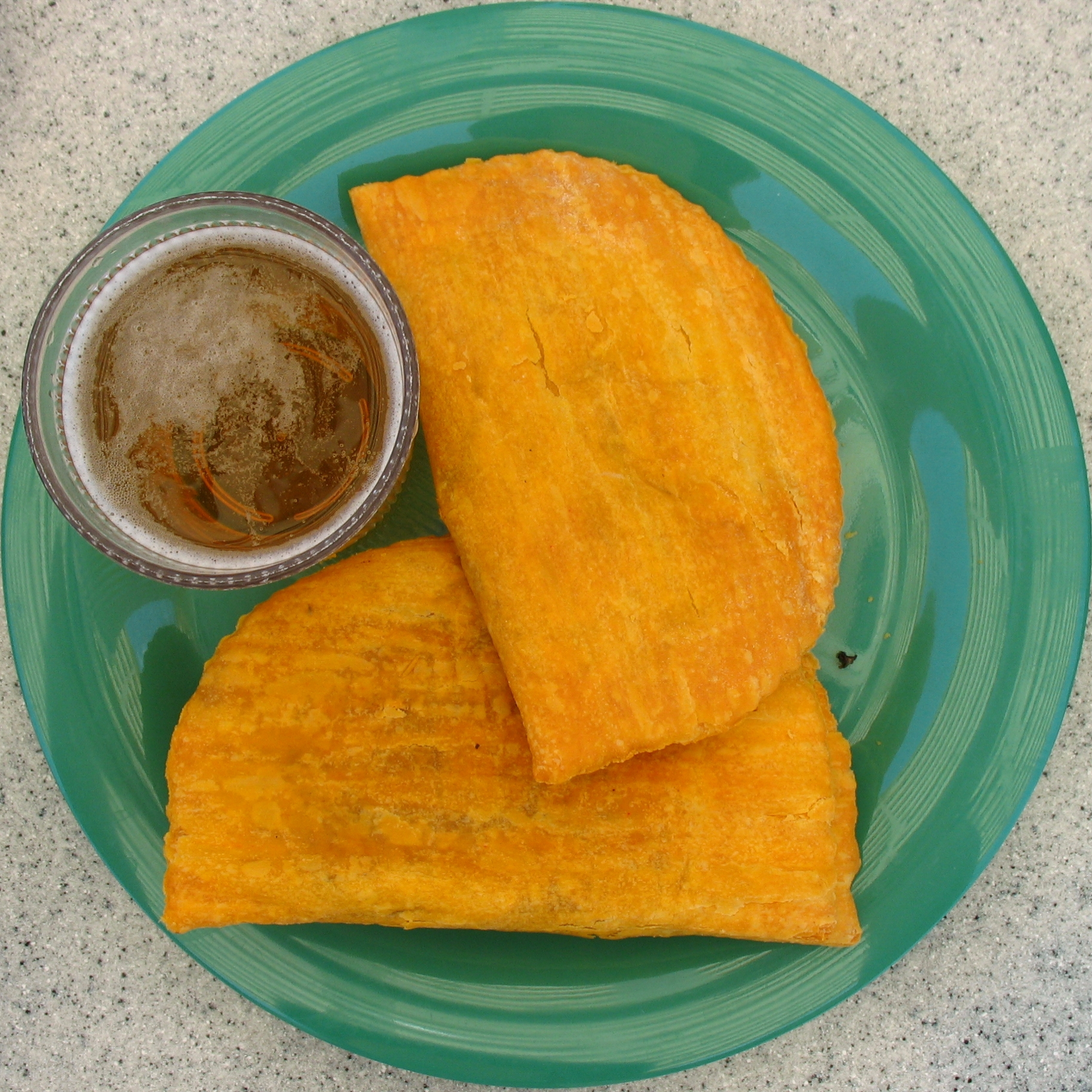
- A plate of Jamaican patties
- Type: Pastry Turnover
- Course: Snack
- Place of origin: Jamaica
- Region or state: Caribbean
- Serving temperature: Hot

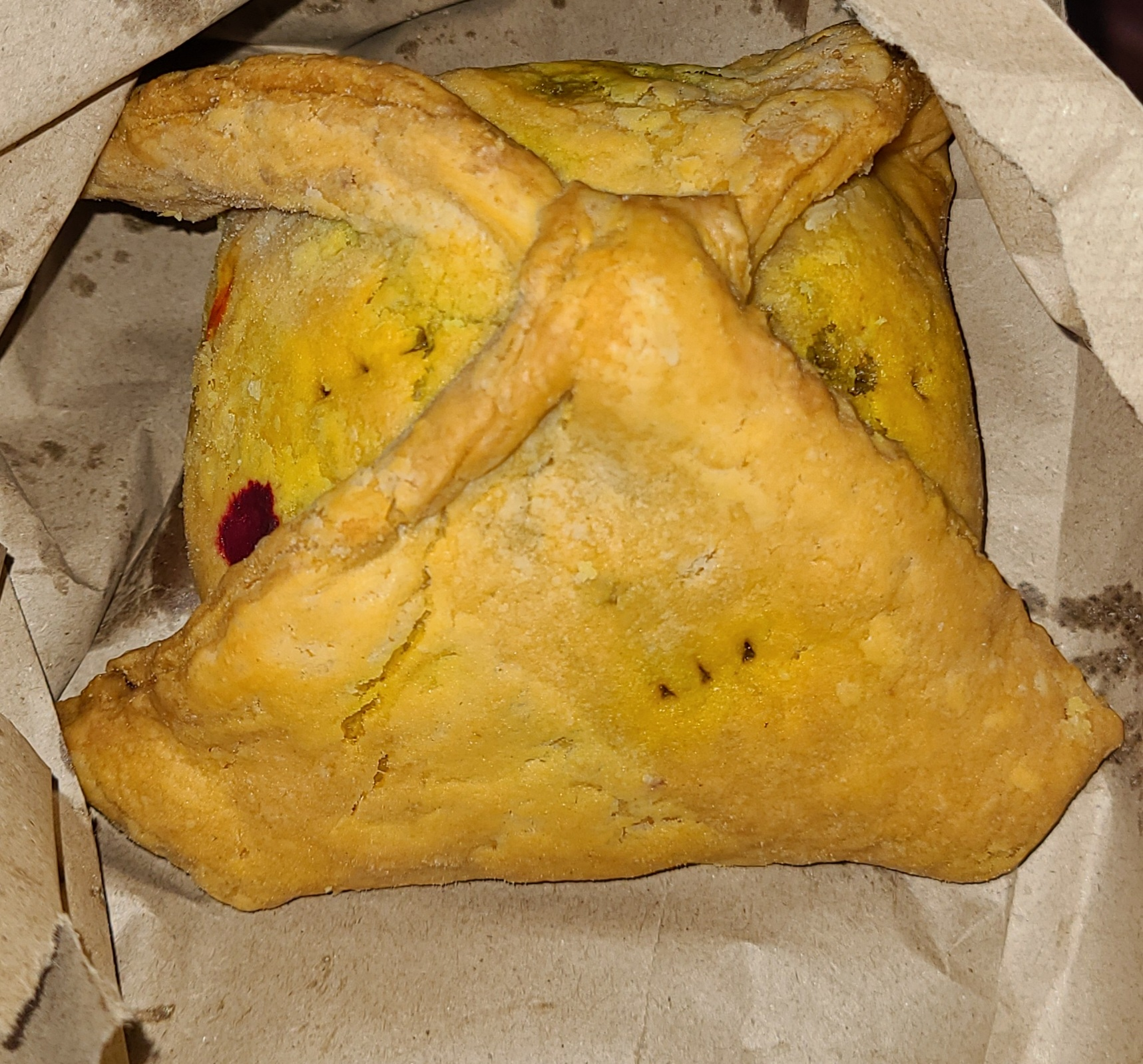
Curry goat patty from Devon House Bakery, Jamaica.

A Jamaican patty is a semicircular pastry that contains various fillings and spices baked inside a flaky shell, often tinted golden yellow with an egg yolk mixture, annatto or turmeric. It is a type of turnover, and is formed by folding the circular dough cutout over the chosen filling, but is savoury and filled with ground meat.

As its name suggests, it is commonly found in Jamaica, and is also eaten in other areas of the Caribbean including the Caribbean coast of Nicaragua, Costa Rica and Panama. It is traditionally filled with seasoned ground beef, but other fillings include chicken, pork, lamb, goat, vegetables, shrimp, lobster, fish, soy, ackee, callaloo, bacon or cheese. Jamaican patties are typically seasoned with onions, garlic, thyme, oregano and chili peppers. The use of the Scotch bonnet, a hot pepper indigenous to Jamaica, adds flavour to the patty. In non-Jamaican-based restaurants, the composition may be extended to include low-fat, whole wheat crusts or the absence of chilies.

In Jamaica, the patty is often eaten as a full meal, especially when paired with coco bread. It can also be served as a snack or appetizer in bite-sized portions called cocktail patties.

== History ==
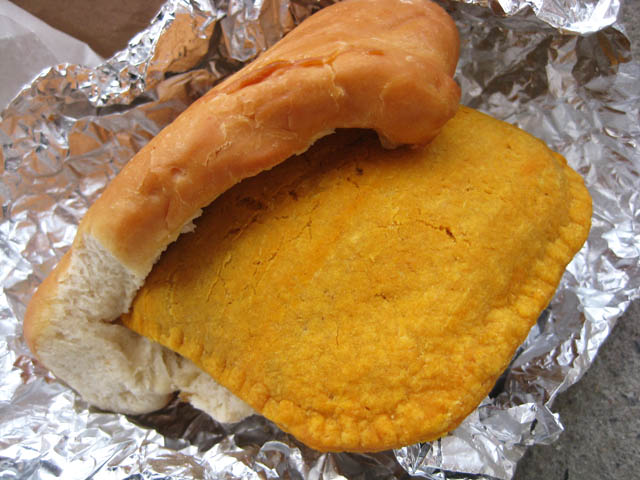
Coco bread stuffed with a beef patty

=== Origin ===
The Jamaican patty is a Creole dish which originated in Jamaica, and spread to coastal Latin America during the colonial era. It is influenced by the Cornish pasty, brought by British colonists and Cornish sailors to the Colony of Jamaica, as well as the empanada-styled turnover by the Spanish. The dish incorporates meats, turmeric and herbs like onion, garlic and thyme introduced by the Spanish, scallion influenced by the indentured Chinese, curry introduced by Indian indentured labourers, along with annatto, Scotch bonnet and cayenne pepper, native to Central and South America, which were introduced to the Caribbean by the native Arawaks, and became integral to their culinary traditions; and African influence reflected in the bold flavour profile created by the blend of spices.

By the 1930s, patties became a mainstay—widely enjoyed as an affordable snack, street food and lunchtime meal. One of the earliest Jamaican patty establishments was Bruce’s Patties in Kingston, founded in 1930 by Zoe Bruce, a local baker. The business was known for selling the "best handmade patties", but closed in 1992 due to the industrialisation of patty production by larger competitors.

In the 1960s, Chinese Jamaican families who had traditionally operated most of the island's bakeries, began baking and selling patties commercially in Jamaica, which led to the establishment of two major franchises—Tastee, founded by Vincent Chang OD in 1966, and Juici Patties, founded by Jukie Chin in 1978. These were followed by other Jamaican-owned franchises such as Mother's Enterprise Ltd., founded in 1981.

=== Jamaican patty abroad ===
Jamaicans brought recipes for the patties northward in the 1960s and 1970s when many immigrated to the United States as hospital orderlies, home health aides and nurses. The patties were then found in restaurants in areas of the New York metropolitan area with high West Indian populations. The patties are equally popular in British cities with large West Indian populations, such as Birmingham, Manchester and London. They are also frequently seen in Toronto, Montreal, Miami, Washington, D.C., and other areas throughout the American northeast and Canadian Great Lakes regions; in many of those areas, they are available in grocery stores, delis, corner stores, and convenience stores.

In recent years, the Jamaican meat patty has been pre-made and frozen for mass sale in Britain, Canada, and the United States. As of 2024, Juici Patties has opened four restaurants in Florida. They have been manufacturing in Canada and the United Kingdom, and export to other places in the Caribbean.

=== Patty wars ===
In February 1985, the Canadian government attempted to ban patty vendors from using the term "beef patty" as it did not comply with the Meat Inspection Act's definition of the federally-regulated term, which was based on hamburger patties and couldn't be encased in dough or a crust. The government demanded the patty vendors to change their names, signs and packaging or risk being fined $5,000 to $11,000. Patty vendors refused to rename the beef patties, and the issue was covered repeatedly by media in both Canada and Jamaica. The government faced pressure to resolve the issue because of an upcoming trip to Jamaica by Prime Minister Brian Mulroney. On February 19, 1985, officials from the Consumer and Corporate Affairs and representatives from the patty vendors agreed to a compromise to call the patty a "Jamaican patty", with no need to rename businesses or change signage. Colin Vaughn called it "a victory for the Jamaican community".

In a Toronto Star column on February 22, 2012, columnist Royson James unofficially declared February 23 as the Jamaican Patty Day in Toronto. The "patty wars" controversy was the subject of a 2022 CBC documentary entitled Patty vs. Patty, featuring an interview with Michael Davidson, directed by Chris Strikes.

== Contemporary usage and commercialization ==
The popularity of the Jamaican patty has grown significantly with immigration from Jamaica, becoming a mainstream food item in some countries. From being a hand-made pastry in Jamaica's homes and bakeries, it has, starting in the 1980s and 1990s, become commercialised and commoditized, especially in North America. The patties are now often made in large numbers by industrial machinery and sold under brand names in supermarkets and in chain restaurants. In the United States, patties are offered by some restaurants such as pizzerias and included in public school lunches. The New York school system distributed more than three million patties in one year.

== See also ==
- Jamaican cuisine
- Meat pie
- Empanada
- List of Jamaican dishes and foods
