= 4 North A =

2020 film by Howie Shia and Jordan Canning

- Directed by: Howie Shia; Jordan Canning
- Written by: Jordan Canning
- Produced by: Annette Clarke
- Edited by: Howie Shia
- Music by: Sacha Ratcliffe
- Production company: National Film Board of Canada
- Release date: 11 September 2020 (TIFF)
- Running time: 11 minutes
- Country: Canada
- Language: English

4 North A is a Canadian animated short film, directed by Howie Shia and Jordan Canning and released in 2020. Told without dialogue, the film portrays a woman reflecting on childhood memories as she sits in a hospital room with her dying father.

The film premiered at the 2020 Toronto International Film Festival on 11 September. It was nominated for Best Animated Short at the 9th Canadian Screen Awards in 2021.

== Plot synopsis ==
A woman spends time idly in the visitors' lounge of a hospital, then watches as a nurse changes the IV bag for her elderly father, whose hospital bed is sectioned off from others on the ward by curtains. After the nurse leaves, the woman sits beside the bed. She recalls being a girl and finding a dead songbird under a tree; her father comes along and gently lifts the animal in cupped hands.

The woman watches another woman helping a man to the next bed, the two enjoying the pleasure of each other's company despite his illness. She goes to her car to smoke a cigarette, and sees a man sobbing in another car. Returning to the hospital ward, she stands outside the curtain to her father's space, not entering until she hears the other woman humming to comfort the man in the next bed.

The woman recalls being a child and spending time happily idle with her father in a fishing boat. When he reels in a fish, he encourages her to put her hand on the animal as it expires.

She hears the man in the next bed coughing and hesitantly raises her hand to the curtain but does not make her presence known. She walks around the hospital, looking at many different things, then returns to her father's bedside. She takes a clock from the wall and removes its battery, making it quiet enough to hear her father's breathing.

The woman remembers being an older girl, being called by friends who had caught a snake with a forked stick. One of them hands her a rock. She blindly smashes the snake, then gasps when she opens her eyes. Her friends run when a dozen baby snakes slither out from the wound in the snake's abdomen. She calls for her father, but he is chopping wood and doesn't hear her, leaving her alone.

Seated at the bedside, the woman cries, holding her face in her hands. From behind the curtain, the other woman reaches out and puts a hand on her shoulder. Back to back, with a curtain between them, they quietly comfort each other.

== Production ==
4 North A was directed by Jordan Canning and Howie Shia. It was written by Canning, with design, storyboard and editing by Shia. Animation was by Simon Cottee, Miranda Quesnel and Duncan Major. Jennifer Krick performed colour correction and additional animation. Sacha Ratcliffe performed the music and sound design. The film was produced by Annette Clarke for the National Film Board of Canada (NFB), and executive produced by Clarke and Michael Fukushima (NFB English Animation Studio).

Canning had wanted to create a project based on a series of stories about her mother's childhood summers spent on Amherst Island (in northeastern Lake Ontario), which all seemed to have themes of animals and death. When working on an NFB project, she decided that animation was the best way to visually convey the stories. Canning connected the stories with her mother's experience at her grandfather's deathbed, examining how parents try to inform their children about death as a part of the natural cycle of life, yet how unprepared one can feel when a loved one nears death.

While Canning was writing the script, she was caring for an ill loved one and spending time in hospitals. She at times felt very alone while surrounded by people, feeling isolated and disconnected. She imagined that she and her mother could have crossed paths while going through similarly difficult experiences, "[as] if strangers in the same ward" and somehow reached out to each other to provide a comforting connection.

Canning sent the script to Clarke, and they discussed potential animation styles and partners. Another NFB producer suggested Shia, whose evocative work impressed Canning. Shia was inspired by the script and agreed to join the project. Collaboration was done remotely as the production team were based in different cities: Montreal, St. John's and Toronto.

According to Shia, they collaborated in directing the project using a mix of styles from their different backgrounds. For example, using subtle pushes, pulls and shifts based in live-action camera movement; schematic-like graphics of repeating patterns in the hospital; and "expressionistic jump-cutting" in the flashbacks. A great deal of time was taken to contemplate the design of the film. Shia stated that he was inspired by an exhibition of Egon Schiele drawings, where the sensual and smudgy portraits contrasted against the stark architecture of the gallery.

Once they had established styles, an animatic, and transitions, Shia set up shots in TVPaint Animation which were sent to the production's animators, Miranda Quesnel, Simon Cottee, and Duncan Major. The emotional arc was stressed to the animators, and multiple rough takes were made for key shots.

The short film is 11 minutes.

== Themes ==
Death is the central theme, referenced in every sequence of the film. Film critic Audrey Fox noted that, through the flashbacks, the woman had always "looked to her father to make sense of the incomprehensible" but as her father's life fades she must make sense of death on her own. Film critic Gary Kramer also notes the loss building in the central character, with her "vivid flashbacks" juxtaposed against the stark sterility of the hospital ward.

== Release ==
The film premiered at the 2020 Toronto International Film Festival (TIFF), on 11 September. The festival took place primarily online due to COVID-19 social distancing restrictions.

The film was screened at a dozen film festivals in 2020–2021, including Black Nights (Estonia), Brooklyn (New York), Etiuda&Anima (Poland), FIN (Nova Scotia), Ottawa, Sommets du cinéma d'animation (Montreal), and Valladolid (Spain).

== Reception ==
=== Critical response ===
Kramer wrote that "4 North A was a highlight" of its program at TIFF, and that the film evoked a deep sense of sadness and loss. Fox found that the film's animation techniques conveyed loss in a way which was "visually dynamic and unbelievably heartbreaking". Daniel Reynolds praised Shia's evocative animation, particularly the transitions into the flashbacks, and Canning's appreciation for stillness and developing a fresh treatment of a universal theme.

Seventh Row included the short on its list of the best films at TIFF 2020, with film critic Orla Smith describing it as a great achievement in evoking "both the gut punches of sadness and the heavy mundane day-to-day reality of grief."

=== Nominations and awards ===
In addition to being selected by over a dozen international film festivals, 4 North A received a nomination for Best Animated Short at the 9th Canadian Screen Awards and won for Best Animation at the Yorkton Film Festival. It also won the Animasian Award at the Toronto Reel Asian International Film Festival (all in 2021).

Ceremony	Category	Recipients	Result	Ref.
9th Canadian Screen Awards	Best Animated Short	Jordan Canning, Annette Clarke, Howie Shia	Nominated	
2021 Yorkton Film Festival	Best Animation	4 North A	Won	
2021 Yorkton Film Festival	Best Director – Fiction	Jordan Canning, Howie Shia	Nominated	
25th Toronto Reel Asian International Film Festival	Michael Fukushima Animasian Award	4 North A	Won	
