= Sex with Sue =

- Film poster
- Genre: Documentary
- Written by: Lisa Rideout
- Directed by: Lisa Rideout
- Starring: Sue Johanson
- Music by: Laura Barrett
- Country of origin: Canada
- Original language: English

Production
- Producers: Sam Dunn; Lisa Rideout
- Cinematography: Ann Tipper; Lulu Wei
- Editors: Erin Gulas; Nick Taylor
- Running time: 88 minutes
- Production company: Banger Films

Original release
- Network: W Network
- Release: October 10, 2022

Sex with Sue is a 2022 Canadian documentary film, directed by Lisa Rideout. The film profiles Sue Johanson, the Canadian sex educator who hosted the Sunday Night Sex Show on radio and television for many years.

The film premiered October 10, 2022, on W Network.

The film won the Canadian Screen Award for Best Documentary Program at the 11th Canadian Screen Awards in 2023. It was also nominated for Best Photography in a Documentary Program or Factual Series (Lulu Wei, Ann Tipper), Best Editing in a Documentary Program or Series (Erin Gulas, Nick Taylor), Best Direction in a Documentary Program (Rideout) and Best Writing in a Documentary Program (Rideout).
