= List of physics mnemonics =

A Magic Triangle image mnemonic - when the terms of Ohm's law are arranged in this configuration, covering the unknown gives the formula in terms of the remaining parameters. It can be adapted to similar equations e.g. F = ma, v = fλ, E = mcΔT, V = πr ^{2}h and τ = rF sinθ. When a variable with an exponent or in a function is covered, the corresponding inverse is applied to the remainder, i.e. $r=\sqrt{\frac{V}{\pi h}}$ and $\theta = \arcsin{\frac{\tau}{rF}}.$

More Magic Triangle image mnemonics in the style of a cheat-sheet for high-school physics – in the SVG file, hover over a symbol for its meaning and formula.

This is a categorized list of physics mnemonics.

== Mechanics ==
=== Work: formula ===
"Lots of Work makes me Mad!":

Work = Mad:

M=Mass

a=acceleration

d=distance

== Thermodynamics ==
=== Ideal gas law ===
"Pure Virgins Never Really Tire":

PV=nRT

The equation PV = nRT represents the ideal gas law, where P is the pressure of the gas, V is the volume, n is the number of moles, R is the universal gas constant, and T is the temperature.

=== Gibbs's free energy formula ===
"Good Honey Tastes Sweet":

(delta)G = H - T(delta)S.

Gibbs free energy is a thermodynamic state function that measures the energy available for a system to do work, and is given by the formula G = H – TS, where H is enthalpy, T is temperature, and S is entropy.

== Electrodynamics ==
=== Ohm's law ===
"Virgins Are Rare":

Volts = Amps x Resistance

=== Relation between Resistance and Resistivity ===
REPLAY

Resistance = ρ (Length/Area)

=== Inductive and Capacitive circuits ===
Once upon a time, the symbol E (for electromotive force) was used to designate voltages. Then, every student learned the phrase ELI the ICE man as a reminder that:

- For an inductive (L) circuit, the EMF (E) is ahead of the current (I)
- While for a capactive circuit (C), the current (I) is ahead of the EMF (E).

And then they all lived happily ever after.

=== Open and Short circuits ===
"There are zero COVS grazing in the field!"

This is a mnemonic to remember the useful fact that:

- The Current through an Open circuit is always zero
- The Voltage across a Short circuit is always zero

=== Order of rainbow colors ===
ROYGBIV (in reverse VIBGYOR) is commonly used to remember the order of colors in the visible light spectrum, as seen in a rainbow.

Richard of York gave battle in vain"

- (red, orange, yellow, green, blue, indigo, violet).

Additionally, the fictitious name Roy G. Biv can be used as well.

- (red, orange, yellow, green, blue, indigo, violet).

=== Speed of light ===
The phrase "We guarantee certainty, clearly referring to this light mnemonic." represents the speed of light in meters per second through the number of letters in each word: 299,792,458.

=== Electromagnetic spectrum ===
In the order of increasing frequency or decreasing wavelength of electromagnetic waves;

Radio waves, Microwaves, Infrared, Visible light, Ultraviolet, X-Rays, Gamma Rays

- Road Men Invented Very Unique Xtra Gums
- Ronald McDonald Invented Very Unusual & eXcellent Gherkins.
- Remember My Instructions Visible Under X-Ray Glasses
- Raging (or Red) Martians Invaded Venus Using X-ray Guns.
- Rahul's Mother Is Visiting Uncle Xavier's Garden.
- Ryann May I Visit YoUr eX-Girlfriend?
- Rich Men In Vegas Use eXpensive Gadgets
- Rich Men In Vegas Use X-ray Glasses
- Royal Magicians Interested Viewing Untied X-mas Gifts
- Retention of Migrant & Immigrant data Varies Under eXternal GDPR

In the order of increasing wavelength;

- Good Xylophones Use Very Interesting Musical Rhythms.
- Godzilla-X Using Violence In Meeting Room.
- Granddad Xavier Unfortunately Vomitted In My Room.
- Grandma's X-Large Underwear Visible In My Room.

=== Microwave frequency bands ===
Microwave frequency bands ordered by increasing wavelengths (decreasing frequencies): King Xerxes Can Seduce Lovely (princesses)

== Other ==
=== Radium series (or uranium series) ===
To remember the decay chain of ^{238}U, commonly called the "radium series" (sometimes "uranium series"). Beginning with naturally occurring uranium-238;

$\begin{array}{l}{}\\ \ce{^{238}_{92}U->[\alpha][4.468 \times 10^9 \ \ce y] {^{234}_{90}Th} ->[\beta^-][24.1 \ \ce d] {^{234\!m}_{91}Pa}} \begin{Bmatrix} \ce{->[0.16\%][1.17 \ \ce{min}] {^{234}_{91}Pa} ->[\beta^-][6.7 \ \ce h]} \\ \ce{->[99.84\%\ \beta^-][1.17 \ \ce{min}]} \end{Bmatrix} \ce{^{234}_{92}U ->[\alpha][2.445 \times 10^5 \ \ce y] {^{230}_{90}Th} ->[\alpha][7.7 \times 10^4 \ \ce y] {^{226}_{88}Ra} ->[\alpha][1600 \ \ce y] {^{222}_{86}Rn}} \\ \ce{^{222}_{86}Rn ->[\alpha][3.8235 \ \ce d] {^{218}_{84}Po} ->[\alpha][3.05 \ \ce{min}] {^{214}_{82}Pb} ->[\beta^-][26.8 \ \ce{min}] {^{214}_{83}Bi} ->[\beta^-][19.9 \ \ce{min}] {^{214}_{84}Po} ->[\alpha][164.3 \ \mu\ce{s}] {^{210}_{82}Pb} ->[\beta^-][22.26 \ \ce y] {^{210}_{83}Bi} ->[\beta^-][5,013 \ \ce d] {^{210}_{84}Po} ->[\alpha][138.38 \ \ce d] {^{206}_{82}Pb}} \end{array}$

A Bitty Bitty Ant Asked Another Ant About Bitty Bitty Ants' Bitty Bitty Aunts

A = alpha decay

B = beta decay

== See also ==
- List of electronic color code mnemonics
- List of chemistry mnemonics
