= Wanda Nolan =

Canadian filmmaker

Wanda Nolan is a Canadian filmmaker from St. John's, Newfoundland and Labrador, most noted for her 2025 short film The Muse.

She began her career as a writer, winning the Cuffer Prize in 2012 for her short story "Nancy Drew". She made her debut as a director with the 2015 short film Crocuses, for which she won the Michelle Jackson Emerging Filmmaker Award at the St. John's International Women's Film Festival.

The Muse premiered at the 2025 Atlantic International Film Festival, where it won the award for Best Atlantic Short Documentary. It subsequently won the Canadian Screen Award for Best Short Documentary at the 14th Canadian Screen Awards in 2026, and the DGC Award for Best Short Film at the 2026 Directors Guild of Canada awards.

== Filmography ==
- Four Sisters - 2010, writer
- Danny - 2014, story editor
- Crocuses - 2015, director and writer
- The Mystery of the Secret Room - 2016, director and writer
- Always Going Never Gone - 2019, director and writer
- The Muse - 2025, director and writer
- Sing the World Better - 2026, director and writer
