= Nalujuk Night (film) =

2021 Canadian short documentary film

- Directed by: Jennie Williams
- Written by: Jennie Williams
- Produced by: Latonia Hartery; Katherine Baulu; Annette Clarke; Rohan Fernando
- Cinematography: Nigel Markham; Duncan De Young
- Edited by: Justin Simms
- Music by: Sarah Harris
- Production company: National Film Board of Canada
- Release date: November 18, 2021 (AFF)
- Running time: 13 minutes
- Country: Canada
- Languages: English; Inuktitut

Nalujuk Night is a Canadian short documentary film, directed by Jennie Williams and released in 2021. The film documents the tradition of "Nalujuk Night" among Inuit of Nunatsiavut, an annual event in which Nalujuit—"startling figures that come from the Eastern sea ice, dressed in torn and tattered clothing, animal skins and furs"—walk through the town, where they reward good children and chase bad children.

Created as part of the National Film Board of Canada's Labrador Documentary Project to foster the creation of documentary films about Inuit culture from an Inuit perspective, the film premiered at the 2021 Atlantic International Film Festival, where it won the award for Best Atlantic Short Documentary.

The film won the Canadian Screen Award for Best Short Documentary at the 10th Canadian Screen Awards in 2022.
