= Lisa Rideout =

Canadian documentary filmmaker

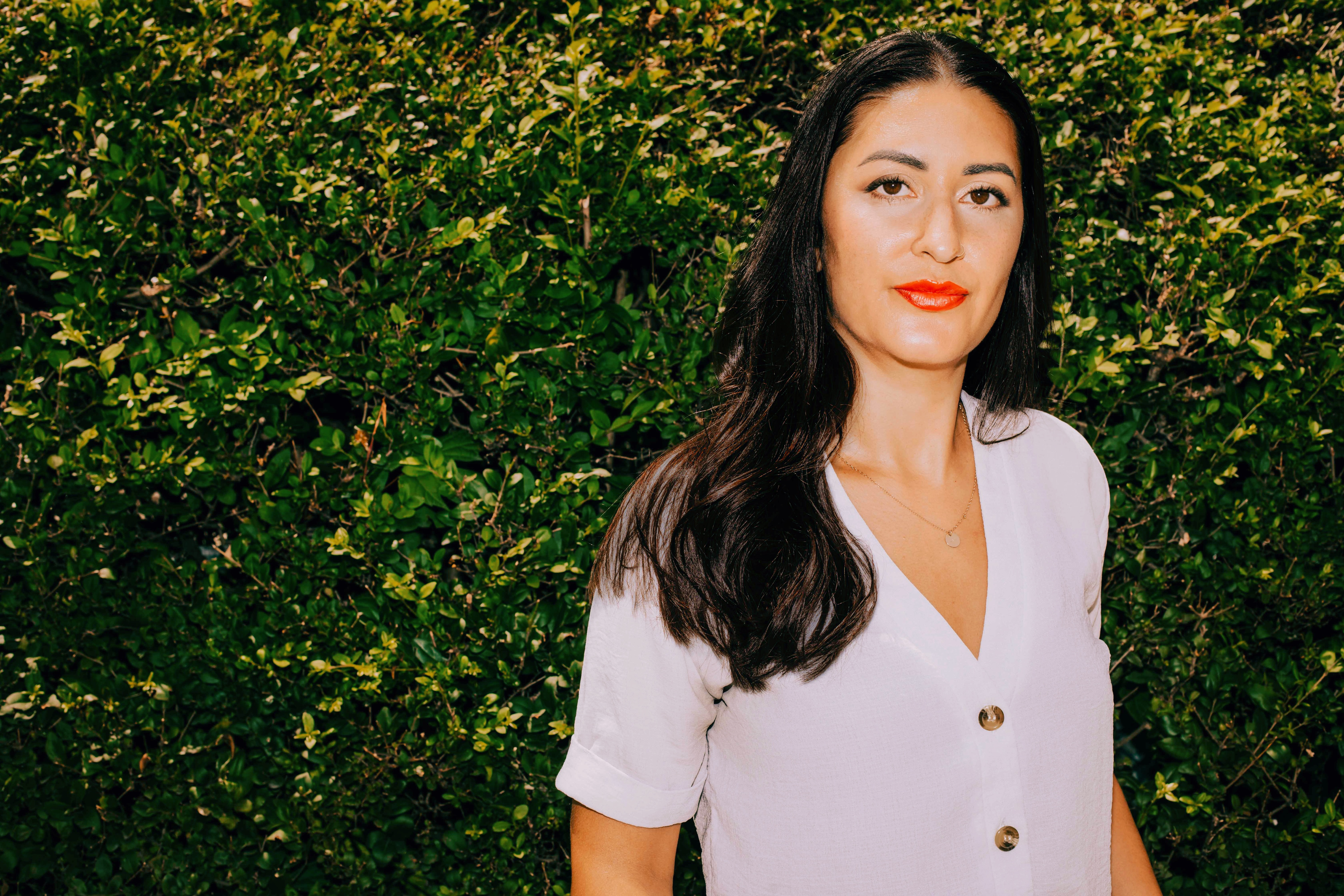
- Born: Canada
- Occupations: Director; writer; producer
- Years active: 2013 – present

Lisa Rideout is a Canadian filmmaker. She is best known for her work on the documentaries Degrassi: Whatever It Takes, Sex with Sue, Take a Walk on the Wildside and One Leg In, One Leg Out.

== Career ==
Rideout holds a MFA degree in documentary media from Ryerson University and her MA in critical media and cultural studies from the School of Oriental and African Studies. She founded her production company, Lifted Eyes Media, in 2013.

In 2017, her documentary Take a Walk on the Wildside, about a clothing store which caters to the unique needs of crossdressers, premiered at Hot Docs. It went on to win the Canadian Screen Award for Best Short Documentary at the 6th Canadian Screen Awards in 2018.

In 2018, her documentary, His Nose, Her Eyes, Whose Face? premiered, inspired by her own multiracial experience. Her documentary, One Leg In, One Leg Out premiered in 2018, about a sex worker who balances her clients with her social work aspirations. The film played at numerous festivals and won multiple awards including best short documentary at the LA Film Festival and best short documentary at the Brooklyn Film Festival.

She was one of the directors for the series This Is Pop, which aired on CTV in Canada and Netflix internationally in 2021.

In 2022, she released Sex with Sue, a documentary about the life and career of Canadian sex educator Sue Johanson. Also in 2023, she produced the second season of the series Citizen Minutes for Hot Docs Canadian International Documentary Festival.

Degrassi: Whatever It Takes, her documentary about the Degrassi teen drama franchise, premiered at the 2025 Toronto International Film Festival.

== Filmography ==
Year	Title	Contribution	Note
2013	While We Wait	Director, editor and cinematographer	Documentary
2014	I'll Be Home	Director, writer, editor, cinematographer and producer	Documentary
2017	Take a Walk on the Wildside	Director, writer and producer	Documentary
2018	His Nose, Her Eyes, Whose Face?	Director, writer and producer	Documentary
2018	One Leg In, One Leg Out	Director, writer and producer	Documentary
2020	Seeing Absence	Director and writer	Documentary
2021	This Is Pop	Director	1 episode
2022	Sex with Sue	Director, writer, producer	Documentary
2023	Citizen Minutes	Producer	Four episodes
2025	Degrassi: Whatever It Takes	Director	Documentary

== Awards and nominations ==
Year	Result	Award	Category	Work	Ref.
2017	Won	Rhode Island International Film Festival	Alternative Spirit Award	Take a Walk on the Wildside	
2018	Won	Canadian Screen Awards	Best Short Documentary	Take a Walk on the Wildside	
2018	Won	LA Film Festival	Best Documentary Short	One Leg In, One Leg Out	
2018	Nominated	Yorkton Film Festival	Best Non Fiction Director	One Leg In, One Leg Out	
2019	Won	Brooklyn Film Festival	Best Documentary Short	One Leg In, One Leg Out	
2019	Nominated	Social Impact Media Awards	Best Documentary Short	One Leg In, One Leg Out	
2023	Nominated	Canadian Screen Awards	Best Direction in a Documentary Program	Sex with Sue	
2023	Nominated	Canadian Screen Awards	Best Writing in a Documentary Program	Sex with Sue	
