= Three Thousand =

- Directed by: Asinnajaq
- Written by: Asinnajaq
- Edited by: Annie Jean
- Music by: Olivier Alary
- Distributed by: National Film Board of Canada
- Release date: 2017
- Running time: 14 minutes
- Country: Canada
- Language: English

for the number see 3000.

Three Thousand is a 2017 Canadian documentary short film written and directed by Asinnajaq, and produced by the National Film Board of Canada. Mixing animation with archival footage, the film explores the cinematic representation of Inuit. The 14 minute documentary dives into the past, present, and future of Inuit "in a new light".

The film received a Canadian Screen Award nomination for Best Short Documentary Film at the 6th Canadian Screen Awards.
