= Just as I Remember =

Just As I Remember
- Directed by: Andrew Moir
- Produced by: Andrew Moir
- Starring: Brad Katz
- Cinematography: Andrew Jeffrey
- Edited by: Rachel McParland
- Music by: Kirsten Scholte
- Release date: 2012
- Running time: 18 minutes
- Country: Canada
- Language: English

Just As I Remember is a Canadian documentary film, directed by Andrew Moir and released in 2012. Based on his own desire to better understand his father Don's struggle with amyotrophic lateral sclerosis, which has left him no longer able to communicate, the film depicts the experiences of Brad Katz, a man who is at an earlier stage of the disease.

The film received a Canadian Screen Award nomination for Best Short Documentary Film at the 2nd Canadian Screen Awards, and won the Toronto Film Critics Association's Manulife Award for Best Student Film at the Toronto Film Critics Association Awards 2012.

It was also the winner of the award for Best Documentary Film at the 2013 Canadian Student Film Festival.
