= Sue Johanson =

Canadian sex educator (1930–2023)

Susan Johanson CM
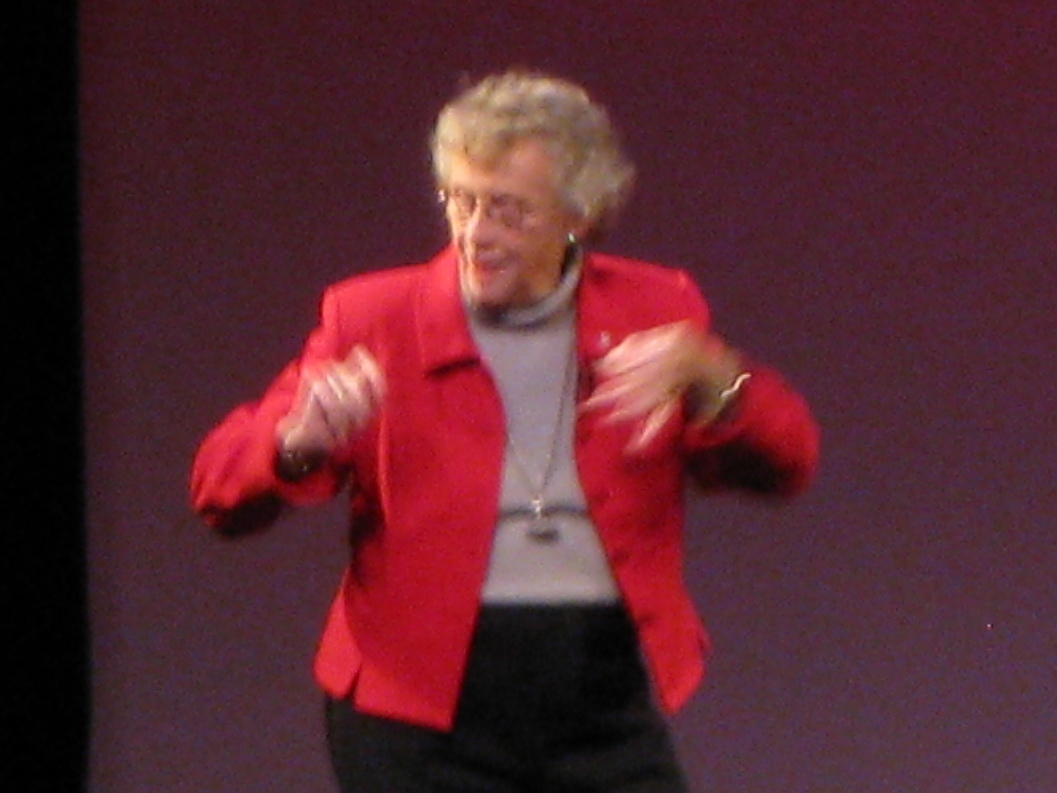
- Johanson speaking in 2008
- Born: Susan Avis Bailey Powell; July 29, 1930; Toronto, Ontario, Canada
- Died: June 28, 2023 (aged 92); Thornhill, Ontario, Canada
- Education: Saint Boniface Hospital School of Nursing; University of Michigan; University of Toronto
- Occupations: Registered nurse; public speaker; sex educator; writer
- Spouse: Ejnor Johanson (m. 1953, died 2019)
- Children: 3
- Writing career
- Years active: 1953–2023
- Website: www.talksexwithsue.com

Susan Avis Bailey Johanson CM (née Powell; July 29, 1930 – June 28, 2023) was a Canadian registered nurse and sex educator. She operated a birth control clinic in Toronto and hosted a series of radio and television programmes on birth control, safer sex and sexual health. She also published several books and wrote a newspaper column promoting sexual health.

== Biography ==
=== Early life and career ===
Johanson was born Susan Avis Bailey Powell in Toronto, Ontario, in 1930 to Wilfrid Powell, a decorated British war hero, and an affluent Ontario-born Irish Protestant mother, Ethel Bell. Her mother died when Johanson was ten. Johanson attended nursing school in St. Boniface Hospital in Winnipeg, graduating as a registered nurse. Soon after, she married a Swedish-Canadian electrician named Ejnor Johanson in 1953. They had three children: Carol, Eric, and Jane. The family moved to North York, where Johanson kept house and raised her children.

In 1970, Johanson opened a birth control clinic in Don Mills CI high school, the first of its kind in Canada. She worked there as a coordinator for 18 years. She continued her education at the Toronto Institute of Human Relations (a postgraduate course in counselling and communication), the University of Toronto (family planning), and the University of Michigan (human sexuality), graduating as a counsellor and sex educator.

=== Radio and television programs ===
Johanson first achieved popularity as a sex educator and therapist hosting her own show on rock radio station Q107 during the 1980s. The show, entitled Sunday Night Sex Show, transitioned into a TV talk show of the same name on the community television Rogers TV in 1985. In 1996, it became a national show on the Women's Television Network (WTN) which ended in 2005.

In January 2002, reruns of the show began to be replayed to American audiences on Oxygen Media. The recorded program was very popular, but American viewers missed the opportunity to call in and ask their own questions. The U.S. version of Sunday Night Sex Show, called Talk Sex with Sue Johanson, produced especially for American audiences, debuted in November 2002 on Oxygen.

On May 7, 2008, it was announced that the next Sunday night's episode of the show would be its last, ending the show's run after six seasons.

Johanson made appearances on the Late Show with David Letterman, The Tonight Show with Jay Leno, and Late Night with Conan O'Brien.

=== Acting ===
Johanson appeared in two episodes of Degrassi Junior High and two episodes of Degrassi: The Next Generation. She played Dr. Sally, a radio host and sex educator who served as an in-universe version of Johanson.

=== Documentary ===
A full-length documentary about Johanson was released in 2022. Entitled Sex with Sue, the documentary chronicles Johanson's life story, directed by Canadian documentary filmmaker Lisa Rideout.

=== Death ===
Johanson died in Thornhill, Ontario, on June 28, 2023.

== Books ==
Johanson was the author of three books: Talk Sex (ISBN 0-14-010377-5), Sex Is Perfectly Natural but Not Naturally Perfect (ISBN 0-670-83856-X), and Sex, Sex, and More Sex (ISBN 0-06-056666-3).

Johanson was also the author of a weekly column published in the Health section of the Toronto Star newspaper.

== Awards and honours ==
Johanson's work educating and informing the public about birth control and sexual health earned her Canada's second highest civilian honour after the Order of Merit, appointment to the Order of Canada as Member (CM) in 2001. In 2010, Johanson was presented with the Bonham Centre Award from the Mark S. Bonham Centre for Sexual Diversity Studies for her contributions to the advancement and education of issues around sexual identification.
