= Don't Come Searching =

- Directed by: Andrew Moir
- Produced by: Andrew Moir; Sherien Barsoum; Michelle Serieux
- Starring: Delroy Dunkley
- Cinematography: Andrew Jeffrey; Andrew Moir
- Edited by: Graeme Ring
- Music by: Ben Fox
- Production company: Hands Up Films
- Release date: May 2, 2022 (Hot Docs)
- Running time: 73 minutes
- Country: Canada
- Language: English

Don't Come Searching is a Canadian documentary film, directed by Andrew Moir and released in 2022. An expansion of Moir's 2017 short documentary film Babe, I Hate to Go, the film centres on Delroy Dunkley, a migrant worker from Jamaica who returns from his job in Canada to announce his diagnosis with terminal cancer to his longtime partner Sophia.

The film premiered at the 2022 Hot Docs Canadian International Documentary Festival.

The film was a nominee for the DGC Allan King Award for Best Documentary Film at the 2022 Directors Guild of Canada awards.
