= Headcase =

2025 Canadian short film directed by Spencer Zimmerman

- Directed by: Spencer Zimmerman
- Written by: Pat Moonie; Spencer Zimmerman
- Produced by: Siobhan Connors; Jessica To; Spencer Zimmerman
- Starring: Siobhan Connors; Pat Moonie; Gigi Saul Guerrero
- Cinematography: Gareth Jones
- Edited by: Anthony Luneberg
- Music by: Ethan Lawrence
- Production companies: Pedestrian Picture Co. Toaster Productions; Key Conspirators; Crazy8s Film Society
- Release date: July 26, 2025 (Fantasia)
- Running time: 16 minutes
- Country: Canada
- Language: English

Headcase is a Canadian short satirical comedy horror film, directed by Spencer Zimmerman and released in 2025. The film stars Siobhan Connors as Karen, an online influencer who kills Brad (Pat Moonie) with her car while filming content, and decides to take advantage of his severed head in a bid to go viral and secure her fame.

The film premiered at the 29th Fantasia International Film Festival on July 26, 2025, as the opener to Kurtis David Harder's feature film Influencers. It was created as part of the 2025 Crazy8s film competition, which challenges six filmmakers to produce a short film over eight days.

A feature expansion of the film is in development.

== Awards ==
Award	Date of ceremony	Category	Recipient	Result	Ref.
Canadian Screen Awards	2026	Best Performance in a Live Action Short Drama	Siobhan Connors	Pending	
Directors Guild of Canada	2025	Best Short Film	Spencer Zimmerman	Nominated	
Leo Awards	2026	Best Musical Score in a Short Drama	Ethan Lawrence	Nominated	
Leo Awards	2026	Best Picture Editing in a Short Drama	Anthony Luneburg	Nominated	
Leo Awards	2026	Best Performance Short Drama	Pat Moonie	Nominated	
Abbotsford Film Festival	2025	Best of BC		Won	
