= Gun Killers =

- Directed by: Jason Young
- Written by: Jason Young
- Produced by: Rohan Fernando
- Cinematography: Paul McCurdy
- Production company: National Film Board of Canada
- Release date: September 23, 2019 (Calgary)
- Running time: 10 minutes
- Country: Canada
- Language: English

Gun Killers is a Canadian documentary film, directed by Jason Young and released in 2019. The film centres on John and Nancy Little, a married couple in rural Nova Scotia who have retired as blacksmiths, but continue to work privately for the Royal Canadian Mounted Police using their professional skills to melt confiscated illegal guns.

The film received a Canadian Screen Award nomination for Best Short Documentary at the 8th Canadian Screen Awards in 2020.
