= Scott Jones (filmmaker) =

Canadian writer and filmmaker

Scott Jones is a Canadian writer and filmmaker. He is most noted for his theatrical play I Forgive You, a collaboration with Robert Chafe which was shortlisted for the Governor General's Award for English-language drama at the 2024 Governor General's Awards.

== Background ==
On October 12, 2013, Jones, a gay resident of New Glasgow, Nova Scotia, was stabbed by a knife-wielding man after leaving the Acro Lounge. The attack left Jones paraplegic.

During his recovery, Jones participated in the creation of Don't Be Afraid, a province-wide campaign to combat homophobia, and was selected as the grand marshal of the 2014 Halifax Pride parade.

His attacker, Shane Matheson, was found guilty and sentenced to 10 years in prison in June 2014.

== Career ==
In 2018, he was the subject of Laura Marie Wayne's documentary film Love, Scott. At the time, he was a music student in Toronto, whose stated goals included creating something positive out of his experience by using choral music as a tool of healing and social change education; he subsequently launched Vox, a community choir dedicated to social change through artistic performance in Halifax.

In 2022, Jones released his own short film, Coin Slot, about the impending anniversary of his 2013 attack. It was the winner of the Best Atlantic Short Film award at the 2022 Atlantic International Film Festival. He previously won the festival's RBC Script Development Award in 2020 for a feature screenplay titled It's the Fear That Keeps Me Awake.

His second short film, Freedom, was screened at the 2024 Atlantic International Film Festival.

I Forgive You premiered in 2022, in a production by the Artistic Fraud of Newfoundland theatre company in St. John's. It was subsequently staged at the National Arts Centre in Ottawa in 2023, in a production directed by Jillian Keiley.
