= William D. MacGillivray =

Canadian film director and screenwriter (born 1946)

- Born: May 24, 1946 (age 80); St. John's, Newfoundland
- Occupations: Film director; Screenwriter; Film producer; Film editor
- Years active: 1979–present

William D. MacGillivray (born May 24, 1946, in St. John's, Newfoundland) is a Canadian film director and screenwriter.

== Career ==
MacGillivray studied art and design at NSCAD University and at Concordia University. He then studied filmmaking at the London Film School in England in 1972.

In 1974, he was one of the founding members of the Atlantic Filmmakers Cooperative. In 1979, he directed his first film, Aerial View. The following year he founded his own production company, Picture Plant, for which he wrote and directed four feature films over the coming years. His most successful film, Life Classes (1988), was nominated for the Genie Award for Best Motion Picture and was selected for official competition at the 38th Berlin International Film Festival.

In 2013, he received the Governor General's Awards in Visual and Media Arts.

== Filmography ==
=== Features ===
- Stations (1983)
- Life Classes (1986)
- My Brother Larry (1988) (dramatic short)
- I Will Not Make Any More Boring Art (1988) (documentary)
- The Vacant Lot (1989)
- Understanding Bliss (1990)
- For Generations to Come (1994) (documentary)
- Silent Messengers (2005) (documentary)
- Reading Alistair MacLeod (2005) (documentary)
- Ron Hynes — The Man of a Thousand Songs (2010) (documentary)
- Hard Drive - (2013)
- Danny (2014) (documentary; co-directed with Justin Simms)
- Under the Weather (2020)

=== Short films ===
- Talkautobanden (1970)
- 7:30 A.M. (1971)
- Lil and Mr. Bill (1973)
- Breakdown (1977)
- Aerial View (1979)
- The Author of These Words (1980)
- Alistair MacLeod (1984)
- Linda Joy (1985)
- Abraham Gesner (1985)
- This Is a Story (2006)

=== Television ===
- Gullage's (1996-7)
