= Canadian Screen Award for Best Short Documentary =

Annual Canadian film award

- Country: Canada
- Presented by: Academy of Canadian Cinema & Television
- First award: 1968
- Currently held by: The Muse (2025)
- Website: academy.ca/awards

The Academy of Canadian Cinema and Television's Award for Best Short Documentary is an annual Canadian film award, presented to a film judged to be the year's best short documentary film. Prior to 2012 the award was presented as part of the Genie Awards program; since 2012 it has been presented as part of the expanded Canadian Screen Awards.

The award has not always been presented at every past Genie or CSA ceremony. In years when the award was not presented, short documentary films were instead eligible for the Best Theatrical Short Film and/or Best (Theatrical/Feature-Length) Documentary categories. In the Canadian Film Awards era, it was often presented solely under the name Best Documentary, but was still presented to shorter documentaries and remained separate from the category for Best Theatrical Documentary.

Under current Academy regulations, the awards for Best Feature Length Documentary and Best Short Documentary can be collapsed into a single award for Best Documentary if either category receives three or fewer eligible submissions, but remain separate if both categories surpass three submissions.

== 1960s ==
| Year | Film | Nominees | Ref |
|---|---|---|---|
1968; 20th Canadian Film Awards
| 1968; 20th Canadian Film Awards | With Drums and Trumpets (Avec tambours et trompettes) | Marcel Carrière | |
1969; 21st Canadian Film Awards
| 1969; 21st Canadian Film Awards | Juggernaut | Walford Hewitson | |

== 1970s ==
| Year | Film | Nominees | Ref |
|---|---|---|---|
1970; 22nd Canadian Film Awards
| 1970; 22nd Canadian Film Awards | KW+ | Aimée Danis | |
1971; 23rd Canadian Film Awards
| 1971; 23rd Canadian Film Awards | The Sea | Bané Jovanovic | |
1972; 24th Canadian Film Awards
| 1972; 24th Canadian Film Awards | Selling Out | Jack Winter, Tadeusz Jaworski | |
1973; 25th Canadian Film Awards
| 1973; 25th Canadian Film Awards | Grierson | Roger Blais | |
| 1973; 25th Canadian Film Awards | Faire hurler les murs | Jean Saulnier | |
1974
| 1974 | No award presented | | |
1975; 26th Canadian Film Awards
| 1975; 26th Canadian Film Awards | At 99: A Portrait of Louise Tandy Murch | Deepa Mehta, Paul Saltzman | |
| 1975; 26th Canadian Film Awards | Cree Hunters of Mistassini | Tony Ianzelo, Boyce Richardson | |
1976; 27th Canadian Film Awards
| 1976; 27th Canadian Film Awards | Volcano: An Inquiry into the Life and Death of Malcolm Lowry | Donald Brittain, John Kramer, James de B. Domville, Robert A. Duncan | |
1977; 28th Canadian Film Awards
| 1977; 28th Canadian Film Awards | Greenpeace: Voyages to Save the Whales | Michael Chechik | |
| 1977; 28th Canadian Film Awards | Henry Ford's America | Donald Brittain | |
| 1977; 28th Canadian Film Awards | Potters at Work | Marty Gross | |
| 1977; 28th Canadian Film Awards | Ritual: The Collective Psyche of Japan | Kalle Lasn | |
1978; 29th Canadian Film Awards
| 1978; 29th Canadian Film Awards | The Hottest Show on Earth | Derek Lamb, Wolf Koenig, Terence Macartney-Filgate | |
| 1978; 29th Canadian Film Awards | Return of the Reluctant Prodigy | Les Rose | |
| 1978; 29th Canadian Film Awards | Song of the Paddle | Bill Mason | |
| 1978; 29th Canadian Film Awards | The World of Noel Coward | Neil Sutherland | |

== 1980s ==
| Year | Film | Nominees | Ref |
|---|---|---|---|
1980; 1st Genie Awards
| 1980; 1st Genie Awards | Priory: The Only Home I've Got | Mark Dolgoy | |
| 1980; 1st Genie Awards | It's Not an Illness | Claire Prieto | |
| 1980; 1st Genie Awards | Taking Chances | Marilyn Belec | |
1981; 2nd Genie Awards
| 1981; 2nd Genie Awards | No award presented | | |
| 1982; 3rd Genie Awards | No award presented | | |
| 1983; 4th Genie Awards | No award presented | | |
| 1984; 5th Genie Awards | No award presented | | |
| 1985; 6th Genie Awards | No award presented | | |
1986; 7th Genie Awards
| 1986; 7th Genie Awards | No More Hiroshima | Martin Duckworth | |
| 1986; 7th Genie Awards | Neon, an Electric Memoir | Rudy Buttignol | |
| 1986; 7th Genie Awards | Skyward | Roman Kroitor | |
1987; 8th Genie Awards
| 1987; 8th Genie Awards | No award presented | | |
| 1988; 9th Genie Awards | No award presented | | |
1989; 10th Genie Awards
| 1989; 10th Genie Awards | The World Is Watching | Harold Crooks, Jim Munro, Peter Raymont | |
| 1989; 10th Genie Awards | Dying to Be Perfect | Eileen Hoeter | |
| 1989; 10th Genie Awards | Space Pioneers, a Canadian Story | Rudy Buttignol | |

== 1990s ==
| Year | Film | Nominees | Ref |
|---|---|---|---|
1990; 11th Genie Awards
| 1990; 11th Genie Awards | Stunt People | Lois Siegel | |
| 1990; 11th Genie Awards | Reading Between the Lines | Martha Davis | |
| 1990; 11th Genie Awards | Who Gets In? | Barry Greenwald | |
1991; 12th Genie Awards
| 1991; 12th Genie Awards | The Colours of My Father: A Portrait of Sam Borenstein | Richard Elson, Sally Bochner | |
| 1991; 12th Genie Awards | The Actor | John Paskievich | |
| 1991; 12th Genie Awards | Hunters and Bombers | Rex Tasker, Alan Hayling | |
| 1991; 12th Genie Awards | In Search of the Edge | Scott Barrie | |
| 1991; 12th Genie Awards | Songololo: Voices of Change | Marianne Kaplan, Cari Green | |
1992; 13th Genie Awards
| 1992; 13th Genie Awards | A Song for Tibet | Anne Henderson, Abby Jack Neidek, Kent Martin | |
| 1992; 13th Genie Awards | A Kind of Family | Andrew Koster | |
| 1992; 13th Genie Awards | Xénofolies | Michel Moreau | |
1993; 14th Genie Awards
| 1993; 14th Genie Awards | The Measure of Your Passage (Le singe bleu) | Esther Valiquette | |
| 1993; 14th Genie Awards | Breaking a Leg: Robert Lepage and the Echo Project | Donald Winkler | |
1994; 15th Genie Awards
| 1994; 15th Genie Awards | No award presented | | |
1995; 16th Genie Awards
| 1995; 16th Genie Awards | Fiction and Other Truths: A Film About Jane Rule | Aerlyn Weissman, Lynne Fernie, Rina Fraticelli | |
| 1995; 16th Genie Awards | Abby, I Hardly Knew Ya | Peter Raymont, Lindalee Tracey | |
| 1995; 16th Genie Awards | Enigmatico | David Mortin, Patricia Fogliato | |
| 1995; 16th Genie Awards | The Shaper | Martin Schliessler, Bill Sheppard | |
| 1995; 16th Genie Awards | Time Is on My Side | Jacques Holender | |
1996; 17th Genie Awards
| 1996; 17th Genie Awards | Mum's the Word (Maman et Ève) | Daniele Caloz, Paul Carrière | |
| 1996; 17th Genie Awards | A Balkan Journey: Fragments from the Other Side of War | Brenda Longfellow | |
1997; 18th Genie Awards
| 1997; 18th Genie Awards | Unveiled: The Mother/Daughter Relationship | Maureen Judge, Janis Lundman | |
| 1997; 18th Genie Awards | Forgotten Warriors | Loretta Todd, Carol Geddes, Michael Doxtater, Jerry Krepakevich | |
| 1997; 18th Genie Awards | Shooting Indians: A Journey with Jeffrey Thomas | Ali Kazimi | |
1998; 19th Genie Awards
| 1998; 19th Genie Awards | Shadow Maker: Gwendolyn MacEwen, Poet | Anita Herczeg, Brenda Longfellow | |
| 1998; 19th Genie Awards | bp: pushing the boundaries | Brian Nash, Elizabeth Yake | |
| 1998; 19th Genie Awards | Remembering Memory | Elizabeth Yake, Lara Fitzgerald | |
1999; 20th Genie Awards
| 1999; 20th Genie Awards | Hemingway: A Portrait | Bernard Lajoie, Érik Canuel, Tatsuo Shimamura | |
| 1999; 20th Genie Awards | In Time's Shadow, the Hegis | Rudy Buttignol, David Way | |

== 2000s ==
| Year | Film | Nominees | Ref |
|---|---|---|---|
2000; 21st Genie Awards
| 2000; 21st Genie Awards | No award presented | | |
| 2001; 22nd Genie Awards | No award presented | | |
| 2002; 23rd Genie Awards | No award presented | | |
| 2003; 24th Genie Awards | No award presented | | |
| 2004; 25th Genie Awards | No award presented | | |
| 2005; 26th Genie Awards | No award presented | | |
| 2006; 27th Genie Awards | No award presented | | |
| 2007; 28th Genie Awards | No award presented | | |
| 2008; 29th Genie Awards | No award presented | | |
2009; 30th Genie Awards
| 2009; 30th Genie Awards | The Delian Mode | Kara Blake, Marie-Josée Saint-Pierre | |
| 2009; 30th Genie Awards | Passages | Marie-Josée Saint-Pierre | |
| 2009; 30th Genie Awards | Petropolis: Aerial Perspectives on the Alberta Tar Sands | Peter Mettler, Sandy Hunter, Laura Severinac | |

== 2010s ==
| Year | Film | Filmmakers | Ref |
|---|---|---|---|
2010; 31st Genie Awards
| 2010; 31st Genie Awards | No award presented | | |
2011; 32nd Genie Awards
| 2011; 32nd Genie Awards | Sirmilik | Zacharias Kunuk, Joel McConvey, Kristina McLaughlin, Kevin McMahon, Michael McMahon, Geoff Morrison, Ryan J. Noth | |
| 2011; 32nd Genie Awards | 75 Watts | John Cullen | |
| 2011; 32nd Genie Awards | Derailments | Chelsea McMullan | |
2012; 1st Canadian Screen Awards
| 2012; 1st Canadian Screen Awards | The Boxing Girls of Kabul | Annette Clarke, Ariel Nasr | |
| 2012; 1st Canadian Screen Awards | The Fuse: Or How I Burned Simon Bolivar | Igor Drljaca | |
| 2012; 1st Canadian Screen Awards | Keep a Modest Head (Ne crâne pas sois modeste) | Deco Dawson, Catherine Chagnon | |
| 2012; 1st Canadian Screen Awards | Let the Daylight Into the Swamp | Anita Lee, Jeffrey St. Jules | |
| 2012; 1st Canadian Screen Awards | Three Walls | Zaheed Mawani, Andrea Bussman | |
2013; 2nd Canadian Screen Awards
| 2013; 2nd Canadian Screen Awards | Chi | Anne Wheeler, Yves J. Ma, Tracey Friesen | |
| 2013; 2nd Canadian Screen Awards | Just As I Remember | Andrew Moir | |
| 2013; 2nd Canadian Screen Awards | Mary & Myself | Sam Decoste, Annette Clarke | |
2014; 3rd Canadian Screen Awards
| 2014; 3rd Canadian Screen Awards | Jutra | Marie-Josée Saint-Pierre, Marc Bertrand, René Chénier | |
| 2014; 3rd Canadian Screen Awards | The Chaperone 3D | Fraser Munden | |
| 2014; 3rd Canadian Screen Awards | Seth's Dominion | Luc Chamberland, Gerry Flahive, Michael Fukushima, Marcy Page | |
2015; 4th Canadian Screen Awards
| 2015; 4th Canadian Screen Awards | Bacon and God's Wrath | Sol Friedman | |
| 2015; 4th Canadian Screen Awards | The Little Deputy | Trevor Anderson, Blake McWilliam | |
| 2015; 4th Canadian Screen Awards | Quiet Zone | David Bryant, Julie Roy, Karl Lemieux | |
| 2015; 4th Canadian Screen Awards | Rebel (Bihttoš) | Elle-Máijá Tailfeathers, Laura Good | |
| 2015; 4th Canadian Screen Awards | World Famous Gopher Hole Museum | Chelsea McMullan, Douglas Nayler | |
2016; 5th Canadian Screen Awards
| 2016; 5th Canadian Screen Awards | This River | Katherena Vermette, Erika MacPherson, Alicia Smith, David Christensen | |
| 2016; 5th Canadian Screen Awards | Frame 394 | Rich Williamson, Shasha Nakhai, Ed Barreveld | |
| 2016; 5th Canadian Screen Awards | The Road to Webequie | Ryan Noth, Tess Girard | |
| 2016; 5th Canadian Screen Awards | Stone Makers (Carrière) | Jean-Marc E. Roy, Colette Loumède, Denis McCready, Claudia Chabot | |
| 2016; 5th Canadian Screen Awards | Tshiuetin | Caroline Monnet, Éric Cinq-Mars | |
2017; 6th Canadian Screen Awards
| 2017; 6th Canadian Screen Awards | Take a Walk on the Wildside | Lisa Rideout, Lauren Grant, Sasha Fisher | |
| 2017; 6th Canadian Screen Awards | Babe, I Hate to Go | Andrew Moir | |
| 2017; 6th Canadian Screen Awards | Three Thousand | Asinnajaq, Kat Baulu | |
2018; 7th Canadian Screen Awards
| 2018; 7th Canadian Screen Awards | My Dead Dad's Porno Tapes | Charlie Tyrell | |
| 2018; 7th Canadian Screen Awards | Bonfires | Martin Bureau | |
| 2018; 7th Canadian Screen Awards | On My Way Out: The Secret Life of Nani and Popi | Barry Avrich, Howie Mandel, Brandon Gross, Skyler Gross | |
| 2018; 7th Canadian Screen Awards | Prince's Tale | Jamie Miller | |
| 2018; 7th Canadian Screen Awards | Voices of Kidnapping | Ryan McKenna | |
2019; 8th Canadian Screen Awards
| 2019; 8th Canadian Screen Awards | Take Me to Prom | Andrew Moir | |
| 2019; 8th Canadian Screen Awards | Acadiana | Guillaume Fournier, Samuel Matteau, Yannick Nolin, Jean-Pierre Vezina | |
| 2019; 8th Canadian Screen Awards | Gun Killers | Jason Young, Rohan Fernando, Annette Clarke | |
| 2019; 8th Canadian Screen Awards | No Crying at the Dinner Table | Carol Nguyen, Aziz Zoromba | |
| 2019; 8th Canadian Screen Awards | Now Is the Time | Christopher Auchter, Selwyn Jacob, Shirley Vercruysse | |

== 2020s ==
| Year | Film | Filmmakers | Ref |
|---|---|---|---|
2020; 9th Canadian Screen Awards
| 2020; 9th Canadian Screen Awards | Sing Me a Lullaby | Tiffany Hsiung | |
| 2020; 9th Canadian Screen Awards | CHSLD | François Delisle | |
| 2020; 9th Canadian Screen Awards | êmîcêtôcêt: Many Bloodlines | Alex Bailey, Theola Ross | |
| 2020; 9th Canadian Screen Awards | Jesse Jams | Trevor Anderson, Alyson Richards, Alexandra Lazarowich, Penny Frazier, Kim Hsu Guise, Lizzy Karp, Christina Willings | |
| 2020; 9th Canadian Screen Awards | Mutts (Clebs) | Halima Ouardiri | |
2021; 10th Canadian Screen Awards
| 2021; 10th Canadian Screen Awards | Nalujuk Night | Jennie Williams, Latonia Hartery, Kat Baulu, Rohan Fernando, Annette Clarke | |
| 2021; 10th Canadian Screen Awards | Babushka | Kristina Wagenbauer | |
| 2021; 10th Canadian Screen Awards | The Brother (Le Frère) | Jérémie Battaglia | |
| 2021; 10th Canadian Screen Awards | Nuisance Bear | Jack Weisman, Gabriela Osio Vanden | |
| 2021; 10th Canadian Screen Awards | Still Processing | Sophy Romvari | |
2022; 11th Canadian Screen Awards
| 2022; 11th Canadian Screen Awards | Patty vs. Patty | Chris Strikes, Kate Fraser, Maya Annik Bedward | |
| 2022; 11th Canadian Screen Awards | The Benevolents (Les Bienvaillants) | Sarah Baril Gaudet | |
| 2022; 11th Canadian Screen Awards | Bill Reid Remembers | Alanis Obomsawin, Annette Clarke | |
| 2022; 11th Canadian Screen Awards | The Goats of Monesiglio | Emily Graves, Anna Cooley, Raj Dhillon | |
| 2022; 11th Canadian Screen Awards | Perfecting the Art of Longing | Kitra Cahana, Kat Baulu, Ariel Nasr, Annette Clarke | |
2023; 12th Canadian Screen Awards
| 2023; 12th Canadian Screen Awards | Madeleine | Raquel Sancinetti | |
| 2023; 12th Canadian Screen Awards | Cherry | Laurence Gagné-Frégeau | |
| 2023; 12th Canadian Screen Awards | Oasis | Justine Martin, Louis-Emmanuel Gagné-Brochu | |
| 2023; 12th Canadian Screen Awards | Violet Gave Willingly | Claire Sanford | |
| 2023; 12th Canadian Screen Awards | Zug Island | Nicolas Lachapelle | |
2024; 13th Canadian Screen Awards
| 2024; 13th Canadian Screen Awards | Hello Stranger | Amélie Hardy, Sarah Mannering, Fanny Drew | |
| 2024; 13th Canadian Screen Awards | Afterwards (Après-coups) | Romane Garant Chartrand, Nathalie Cloutier | |
| 2024; 13th Canadian Screen Awards | The Bird in My Backyard | Ryan Wilkes | |
| 2024; 13th Canadian Screen Awards | perfectly a strangeness | Alison McAlpine | |
| 2024; 13th Canadian Screen Awards | Who Loves the Sun | Arshia Shakiba, Zaynê Akyol | |
2025; 14th Canadian Screen Awards
| 2025; 14th Canadian Screen Awards | The Muse | Wanda Nolan, Liz Cowie, Rohan Fernando, Nathalie Cloutier | |
| 2025; 14th Canadian Screen Awards | King's Court | Serville Poblete, Kate Vollum, Chanda Chevannes | |
| 2025; 14th Canadian Screen Awards | La Mayordomía | Martin Edralin | |
| 2025; 14th Canadian Screen Awards | My Memory-Walls (Mes murs-mémoires) | Axel Robin | |
| 2025; 14th Canadian Screen Awards | Send and Receive | Dominique Keller | |

== See also ==
- Prix Iris for Best Short Documentary
