= Jennie Williams =

Canadian film and television director (born 1981)

- Born: 1981 (age 44–45); Happy Valley-Goose Bay, Labrador, Canada
- Occupations: Photographer, filmmaker, throat singer

Jennie Williams (born 1981) is a Canadian Inuk photographer, filmmaker and throat singer from Newfoundland and Labrador. She is most noted for her short documentary film Nalujuk Night, which won the Canadian Screen Award for Best Short Documentary at the 10th Canadian Screen Awards in 2022.

== Early life and education ==
Originally from Happy Valley-Goose Bay, Williams moved to St. John's in early adulthood, and later to Nain. After moving to St. John's at the age of 21, she joined what was then called St. John's Native Friendship Centre, now called First Light, an Indigenous community hub. Williams says that First Light played a major role in her desire to connect with her Inuit identity, and to learn more about different Indigenous communities. She is currently the facilitator of the arts and culture programming through First Light, teaching throat singing, dance-drumming and leads various activities like sewing workshops.

At the age of 25, after saving up money, she bought her first professional camera. In Nain, she began researching and documenting the cultural traditions of the region's Inuit population, becoming known as a documentary photographer for her series of black-and-white photographs of the community.

In 2022, she was the recipient of the annual Indigenous Advocate Award from First Voice, a cultural organization for indigenous people in Newfoundland and Labrador.

Jennie Williams is the mother of 6 children who range from the ages of 4–25 years old.

== Career ==
=== Filmography ===
==== Nalujuk Night - short film (2021) ====
A thriller style short documentary directed by Jennie Williams, Nalujuk Night follows the Labrador Inuit elders who annually on January 6 act as the Nalujuit in the traditional Inuit Nalujuk Night. The short is Williams' first film project, produced by Labrador Doc Project (Lab Doc Project) by the National Film Board (NFB). The Lab Doc Project is an initiative to tell stories from Inuit perspectives, from first-time Inuit filmmakers in Nunatsiavut and Labrador. The film is entirely in black and white, which carries over from "A Way of Life" - her photo series, which inspired Williams to make Nalajuk Night into a film. Jennie Williams' photography projects of the landscape and people in Nain are also often in black and white.

In an interview at the FIN Atlantic Film Festival in Halifax, Nova Scotia, Williams expressed her excitement and surprise that the film won the Best Atlantic Short Documentary award. She said she loved the experience of filmmaking, and intends to make more films which document relatively unknown traditions from remote places around the world.

=== Features ===
==== Women of This Land - mini docu-series (2024 - present) ====
Women of this Land is a mini-documentary style series, featuring Indigenous women from each province of Atlantic Canada. Each episode follows a different Indigenous woman, sharing the ways they each connect to the land and their histories. Jennie Williams features in an episode about Newfoundland and Labrador, and describes how her visual art and drum teaching maintain ties to her Inuit heritage.

==== Evan’s Drum - short documentary (2021) ====
Jennie Williams features in Evan’s Drum, which follows a seven year old Inuk boy - Evan, and his mother as they bring the tradition of the Inuit drum back to their community in Happy Valley Goose Bay, Newfoundland. Jennie Williams plays Evan’s drum teacher, which she also does in real life in her community. The documentary was nominated in the Yorkton Film Festival in the Documentary Arts and Culture category.

=== Photography ===
==== "A Way Of Life" photo series (2016) ====
Williams depicts the connections of her northern coastal Labrador community by photographing everyday reality and traditional events, as well as creating a forum for storytelling and traditional knowledge sharing.
