= Lunatic: The Luna Vachon Story =

- Directed by: Kate Kroll
- Screenplay by: Kate Kroll; Aynsley Baldwin
- Produced by: Kate Kroll; Pasha Patriki; Michael Paszt
- Starring: Luna Vachon
- Cinematography: Claire Sanford; Alysha Galbreath; Sarah Thomas Moffat
- Edited by: Aynsley Baldwin
- Music by: Conan Karpinski
- Production company: Black Moon Media
- Release date: March 29, 2025 (CFF)
- Running time: 114 minutes
- Country: Canada
- Language: English

Lunatic: The Luna Vachon Story is a Canadian documentary film, directed by Kate Kroll and released in 2025. The film profiles Luna Vachon, who was a pioneering star of women's professional wrestling until her death in 2010.

The film premiered at the 2025 Canadian Film Festival. It was later screened in the United States at Fantastic Fest.

== Awards ==
Award	Date of ceremony	Category	Recipient(s)	Result	Ref.
Vancouver Film Critics Circle	February 23, 2026	Best Canadian Documentary	Lunatic: The Luna Vachon Story	Nominated	
Directors Guild of Canada	2026	DGC Allan King Award for Best Documentary Film	Lunatic: The Luna Vachon Story	Pending	
