= On My Way Out: The Secret Life of Nani and Popi =

- Directed by: Brandon Gross; Skyler Gross
- Produced by: Barry Avrich; Howie Mandel; Brandon Gross; Skyler Gross
- Starring: Ruth Blank; Roman Blank
- Cinematography: Brandon Gross
- Edited by: Tiffany Beaudin
- Music by: Robi Botos
- Production company: Melbar Entertainment Group
- Release date: September 8, 2017 (TIFF)
- Running time: 40 minutes
- Country: Canada
- Language: English

On My Way Out: The Secret Life of Nani and Popi is a Canadian short documentary film, directed by Brandon Gross and Skyler Gross, produced by Howie Mandel and Barry Avrich and released in 2017. Profiling the filmmakers' grandparents, Holocaust survivors Ruth and Roman Blank, the film depicts their preparation for their 65th wedding anniversary, and focuses on their revelation to the rest of the family that Roman is gay and Ruth has always known this.

The film premiered at the 2017 Toronto International Film Festival.

== Awards and nominations ==
- David Camera Award for Best Short Documentary at the 2018 Warsaw Jewish Film Festival
- Canadian Screen Award nomination for Best Short Documentary at the 7th Canadian Screen Awards in 2019.
