= Pass the Salt =

Canadian romantic comedy web series

Pass the Salt is a Canadian romantic comedy web series, premiering in 2026 on OutTVGo. Created and directed by Panta Mosleh, the series stars Mosleh as Parmiss Mansour, an Iranian Canadian graduate student who falls in love with Nava (Amanda Wear), a Jewish woman, and must navigate coming out as queer to her traditional Muslim family.

The cast also includes Adam Fox, Nathanael Vass, Valeh Ashraf, Moheb Jindran and Babak Haleky in supporting roles.

OutTV announced the series in March 2026. It was produced by PK Studio Productions, and shot in Vancouver, British Columbia.

It is slated to premiere on OutTVGo as a six-part web series on November 2, 2026, and will also be broadcast by Hollywood Suite in a feature film edit. In advance of its premiere, it received a renewal for a second season.
