= The Road to Webequie =

- Directed by: Tess Girard; Ryan Noth
- Written by: Tess Girard; Ryan Noth; Kersh Theva
- Produced by: Tess Girard; Ryan Noth; Kersh Theva
- Cinematography: Tess Girard; John Price
- Edited by: Ryan Noth; Andres Landau
- Music by: Paul Aucoin
- Production company: Fifth Town Films
- Distributed by: BravoFACT
- Release date: September 13, 2016 (TIFF)
- Running time: 19 minutes
- Country: Canada
- Language: English

The Road to Webequie is a Canadian short documentary film, directed by Tess Girard and Ryan Noth and released in 2016. The film profiles the Webequie First Nation, a remote Nishnawbe Aski community in Northern Ontario, and the potential impacts both positive and negative of the Ontario provincial government's plan to build the community's first all-weather road access as part of the Northern Ontario Ring of Fire mining development.

The film had its world premiere at the 2016 Toronto International Film Festival. It was a shortlisted Canadian Screen Award nominee for Best Short Documentary Film at the 5th Canadian Screen Awards in 2017.
