= Take a Walk on the Wildside =

- Directed by: Lisa Rideout
- Written by: Lisa Rideout
- Produced by: Sasha Fisher; Lisa Rideout
- Starring: Patricia Ann Aldridge
- Cinematography: Jack Weisman
- Edited by: Lawrence Jackman; Avril Jacobson
- Music by: Ben Fox
- Production companies: Lifted Eyes Media; Clique Pictures; BravoFACT
- Release date: 2017 (Hot Docs)
- Running time: 15 minutes
- Country: Canada
- Language: English

Take a Walk on the Wildside is a 2017 Canadian documentary film directed and written by Lisa Rideout. The film profiles Take a Walk on the Wildside, a clothing store in Toronto, Ontario, which caters to the unique needs of cross-dressing men.

The film premiered at the Hot Docs Canadian International Documentary Festival in 2017.

The film won the Canadian Screen Award for Best Short Documentary Film at the 6th Canadian Screen Awards.

Rideout followed up in 2018 with One Leg In, One Leg Out, a short documentary about a transgender woman she had met during the making of Wildside.
