= Claire Sanford =

Canadian film director and cinematographer

Claire Sanford is a Canadian film director and cinematographer based in Montreal, Quebec. She is most noted for her 2022 short documentary film Violet Gave Willingly, which was named to the Toronto International Film Festival's annual year-end Canada's Top Ten list for 2022, and received a Canadian Screen Award nomination for Best Short Documentary at the 12th Canadian Screen Awards in 2024.

Originally from Texada Island in British Columbia, she studied film at Simon Fraser University. She has directed a number of short films, including Lily (2009), Rheo (2014), What Should Be Heard Not Seen (2018) and Texada (2023).

Her cinematography credits have included the feature documentary film Fanny: The Right to Rock (2021), for which she was a Prix Iris nominee for Best Cinematography in a Documentary at the 24th Quebec Cinema Awards in 2022, as well as Curl Power (2024), Larry (They/Them) (2024) and Lunatic: The Luna Vachon Story (2025).
