= Babe, I Hate to Go =

- Directed by: Andrew Moir
- Produced by: Andrew Moir; Sherien Barsoum
- Starring: Delroy Dunkley
- Cinematography: Andrew Jeffrey
- Edited by: Graeme Ring
- Distributed by: Canadian Broadcasting Corporation
- Release date: 2017 (Hot Docs)
- Running time: 19 minutes
- Country: Canada
- Language: English

Babe, I Hate to Go is a 2017 Canadian documentary film directed by Andrew Moir. The film centres on Delroy Dunkley, a migrant worker from Jamaica who works on a farm in Southwestern Ontario to support his family, but is trying to shield them from his own cancer diagnosis.

The film premiered at the Hot Docs Canadian International Documentary Festival in 2017, before being distributed primarily on the Canadian Broadcasting Corporation's Short Docs web platform.

The film received a Canadian Screen Award nomination for Best Short Documentary Film at the 6th Canadian Screen Awards.

A full-length version of the film, Don't Come Searching, was released in 2022.
