= Love, Scott =

2018 Canadian documentary film

- Directed by: Laura Marie Wayne
- Written by: Laura Marie Wayne
- Produced by: Annette Clarke
- Starring: Scott Jones
- Cinematography: Laura Marie Wayne
- Edited by: Laura Marie Wayne; Marcos Caraballo
- Release date: March 24, 2018 (BFI Flare)
- Running time: 76 minutes
- Country: Canada
- Language: English

Love, Scott is a 2018 Canadian documentary film, directed by Laura Marie Wayne. The film profiles Scott Jones, a gay man who was left paraplegic in an anti-gay attack in 2013.

== Background ==
On October 12, 2013, Jones, a gay resident of New Glasgow, Nova Scotia, was stabbed by a knife-wielding man after leaving the Acro Lounge. His attacker, Shane Matheson, was found guilty and sentenced to 10 years in prison in June 2014. During his recovery, Jones participated in the creation of Don't Be Afraid, a province-wide campaign to combat homophobia, and was selected as the grand marshal of the 2014 Halifax Pride parade.

== Film ==
The film profiles Jones, who was by 2018 a music student in Toronto, Ontario. The film explores his process of reaching a place of forgiveness, both against his attacker and against the police for declining to prosecute the case as a hate crime, and his desire to create something positive out of his experience by using choral music as a tool of healing and social change education.

The film had its theatrical premiere at BFI Flare: London LGBT Film Festival in March 2018, and had its North American premiere at the Hot Docs Canadian International Documentary Festival in April. It was later screened at the Inside Out Film and Video Festival in May, where it received the Jury Prize for Best Canadian Feature.
