= Send and Receive =

- Directed by: Dominique Keller
- Written by: Dominique Keller; Krystal Moss
- Produced by: Dominique Keller
- Cinematography: Krystal Moss
- Music by: Andrea Wettstein
- Release date: September 22, 2025 (CIFF)
- Running time: 14 minutes
- Country: Canada
- Languages: English; French; Japanese

Send and Receive is a Canadian short documentary film, directed by Dominique Keller and released in 2025. The film explores the importance of postal workers in small communities, where they often develop personal relationships with the clients that they serve.

The film premiered at the 2025 Calgary International Film Festival, where it won the Audience Choice award for the Alberta Shorts program, and the Devon Bolton Memorial Award.

The film won the Rosie Award for Best Documentary Production Under 30 Minutes in 2025, and received a Canadian Screen Award nomination for Best Short Documentary at the 14th Canadian Screen Awards in 2026.
