= Mary & Myself =

- Directed by: Sam Decoste
- Written by: Sam Decoste
- Produced by: Annette Clarke
- Narrated by: Jia Tsu Ye-Thompson
- Music by: Judith Gruber-Stitzer
- Production company: National Film Board of Canada
- Release date: April 27, 2013 (Hot Docs)
- Running time: 7 minutes
- Country: Canada
- Language: English

Mary & Myself is a Canadian documentary film, directed by Sam Decoste and released in 2013. Through animation and archival photographs, the film depicts the real-life story of Jia Tsu Ye-Thompson and Mary Mohammed, two elderly women rehearsing for their stage debut playing the comfort women in a production of The Vagina Monologues.

The film received a Canadian Screen Award nomination for Best Short Documentary Film at the 2nd Canadian Screen Awards in 2014.
