= Tess Girard =

Canadian filmmaker and cinematographer

Tess Girard is a Canadian filmmaker and cinematographer.

== A Simple Rhythm ==
She is best known for her documentary A Simple Rhythm a documentary exploring rhythm from the perspective of mathematics, music, biology, philosophy, and psychology, which included interviews with Charles Spearin (of Broken Social Scene, Do Make Say Think, The Happiness Project), and mathematician Steven Strogatz. The film played at the 2011 Hot Docs Canadian International Documentary Festival, Vancouver International Film Festival 2010, 2011 Rencontres internationales du documentaire de Montréal and 2011 Buenos Aires International Festival of Independent Cinema. The outtakes of A Simple Rhythm were edited into the radio documentary The Heart of the Beat for CBC's Ideas and included additional material with science writer Philip Ball.

== Other works ==
Girard's other works include The Road to Webequie (co-directed with Ryan J Noth) which played at the 2016 Toronto International Film Festival and was nominated for an Academy of Canadian Cinema and Television Award for Best Short Documentary at the 5th Canadian Screen Awards. She is also known for her works Canada The Good? (Hot Docs 2016), Old Growth (Toronto International Film Festival 2012, Canada's Top Ten 2012) and Benediction (Toronto International Film Festival 2012).

Girard is currently making a feature film with the National Film Board of Canada called As The Crow Flies.
