= Three Walls =

- Directed by: Zaheed Mawani
- Produced by: Zaheed Mawani; Andrea Bussman
- Cinematography: Maya Bankovic; Jared Raab
- Edited by: Zaheed Mawani
- Music by: Damian Valles
- Release date: March 27, 2011 (Palm Beach)
- Running time: 26 minutes
- Country: Canada
- Language: English

Three Walls is a Canadian documentary film, directed by Zaheed Mawani and released in 2011. Made as part of Mawani's graduate thesis for the film studies program at York University, the film presents a humorous look at the history of the office cubicle.

The film premiered at the 2011 Palm Beach International Film Festival, and was a Canadian Screen Award nominee for Best Short Documentary Film at the 1st Canadian Screen Awards.
