= The Bird in My Backyard =

2024 Canadian short film directed by Ryan Wilkes

- Directed by: Ryan Wilkes
- Produced by: Ryan Wilkes
- Starring: Eric Pittman
- Cinematography: Ryan Wilkes
- Edited by: Ryan Wilkes
- Music by: Jonathan Kawchuk
- Production company: Trochilus Films
- Distributed by: CBC Gem
- Release date: December 26, 2024 (YouTube)
- Running time: 20 minutes
- Country: Canada
- Language: English

The Bird in My Backyard is a 2024 Canadian short documentary film, written and directed by Ryan Wilkes. The film profiles Eric Pittman, a retired helicopter pilot who passionately observes and films hummingbirds in his backyard.

Wilkes independently released the film on YouTube in December 2024, with it subsequently being picked up for distribution on CBC Gem.

The film received a Canadian Screen Award nomination for Best Short Documentary at the 13th Canadian Screen Awards in 2025.
