= Hatch (film) =

2024 Canadian short film directed by Alireza Kazemipour and Panta Mosleh

- Directed by: Alireza Kazemipour; Panta Mosleh
- Written by: Alireza Kazemipour
- Produced by: Alireza Kazemipour; Panta Mosleh; Sina Nazarian
- Starring: Ali Eldurssi; Aixa Kay
- Cinematography: Mikah Sharkey
- Edited by: Saeed Vahidi
- Music by: Mehrdad Jafari Raad
- Production company: PK Studio Productions
- Distributed by: Voce Spettacolo
- Release date: October 1, 2024 (VIFF)
- Running time: 11 minutes
- Country: Canada
- Language: English

Hatch is a Canadian short drama film, written and directed by Alireza Kazemipour and Panta Mosleh, and released in 2024. The film stars Ali Eldurssi as Naaji, a young Afghan boy travelling with his mother Robaba (Aixa Kay) in the empty water tank of a truck in an attempt to escape Afghanistan.

The cast also includes Helena Marie, Craig March, Araz Yaghoubi, Daniella Eldurssi, Thomas Cadrot, Hani Mefti, Victor Dolhai and Ashley O'Connell.

The film premiered at the 2024 Vancouver International Film Festival.

== Awards ==
Award	Year	Category	Recipient	Result	Ref.
Canadian Screen Awards	2025	Best Performance in a Live Action Short Drama	Ali Eldurssi	Nominated	
Red Sea International Film Festival	2024	Best Short Film	Alireza Kazemipour, Panta Mosleh, Sina Nazarian	Won	
Reelworld Film Festival	2024	Outstanding Short Film Actress	Aixa Kay	Won	
Directors Guild of Canada	2025	Best Short Film	Alireza Kazemipour, Panta Mosleh	Nominated	
