= List of electronic color code mnemonics =

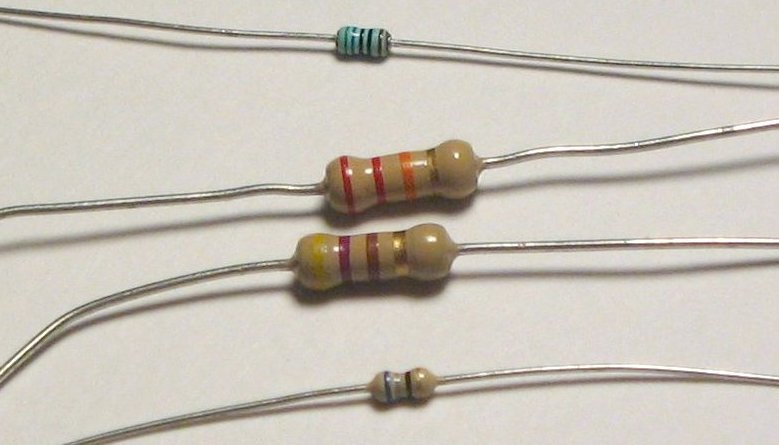
Color coded resistors

Mnemonics are used to help memorize the electronic color codes for resistors. Mnemonics describing specific and relatable scenarios are more memorable than abstract phrases.

== Resistor color code ==
Color	Value
Black	0
Brown	1
Red	2
Orange	3
Yellow	4
Green	5
Blue	6
Violet	7
Grey	8
White	9
Gold	±5%
Silver	±10%
None	±20%

The first letter of the color code is matched by order of increasing magnitude. The electronic color codes, in order, are:

- 0 = Black
- 1 = Brown
- 2 = Red
- 3 = Orange
- 4 = Yellow
- 5 = Green
- 6 = Blue
- 7 = Violet
- 8 = Gray
- 9 = White

== Easy to remember ==
A mnemonic which includes color name(s) generally reduces the chances of confusing black and brown. Some mnemonics that are easy to remember are:

- Bachelor Boys Rush Our Young Girls But Veronica Goes Wild for Gold or Silver Necklaces.
- Back-Breaking Rascals Often Yield Grudgingly But Virtuous Gentlemen Will Give Shelter Nobly. (with tolerance bands Gold, Silver or None)
- Bad Bears Raid Our Yummy Grub But Veto Grey Waffles.
- Bad Booze Rots Our Young Guts But Vodka Goes Well – get some now.
- Bad Boys Ride On Yellow Goats Between Very Great Willows (God|George Says Now)
- Bad Boys Run Over Yellow Gardenias Behind Victory Garden Walls.
- Badly Burnt Resistors On Your Ground Bus Void General Warranty.
- Bat Brained Resistor Order You Gotta Be Very Good With.
- Beach Bums Rarely Offer You Gatorade But Very Good Water.
- Beetle Bailey Runs Over Your General Before Very Good Witnesses.
- Better Be Right Or You're Gonna Be Violently Gouged With Golden Spaghetti.
- Better Be Right Or Your Great Big Vacation Goes Wrong.
- Better Be Right Or Your Great Big Values Go Wrong.
- Better Be Right Or Your Great Big Venture Goes West.
- Betty Brown Runs Over Your Garden But Violet Gingerly Walks.
- Big Beautiful Roses Occupy Your Garden But Violets Grow Wild.
- Big Boys Race Our Young Girls But Violet Generally Wins.
- Big Brown Rabbits Often Yield Great Big Vocal Groans When Gingerly Slapped Needlessly.
- Billy Brown Ran Out Yelling Get Back Violets Getting Wet.
- Black Bananas Really Offend Your Girlfriend But Violets Get Welcomed.
- Black Beetles Running Over Your Garden Bring Very Grey Weather.
- Black Bears Raid Our Yellow Green Bins Violently Grabbing Whatever Goodies Smell Nice.
- Black Birds Run Over Your Gay Barely Visible Grey Worms.
- Bright Boys Rave Over Young Girls But Veto Getting Wed.
- Buster Brown Races Our Young Girls But Violet Generally Wins.
- By Being Revolutionary, Our Young Girls Become Very Great Women.
- Better Be Right Or Your Great Big Plan Goes Wrong. (with P = Purple for Violet)
- Better Be Right Or Your Great Big Plan Goes Wrong - Go Start Now!

== Canada ==
A mnemonic that is taught in classrooms in Canada:

- Black Bears Roam Our Yukon Grounds But Vanish in Gray Winter for Gold and Silver Necklaces

== India ==
A mnemonic that is commonly taught in classrooms in India:

- B B ROY of Great Britain had a Very Good Wife who wore Gold and Silver Necklace.
- Bill Brown Realised Only Yesterday Good Boys Value Good Work.

== UK ==
Mnemonics commonly taught in UK engineering courses include:

- Bill Brown Realised Only Yesterday Good Boys Value Good Work.
- Bye Bye Rosie Off You Go to Become a Very Good Wife.
- Bye Bye Rosie Off You Go to Birmingham Via Great Western.
- Bye Bye Rosie Off You Go to Bristol Via Great Western.

== Dutch ==
This mnemonic is commonly taught in the Netherlands:

- Zij Bracht Rozen Op Gerrits Graf Bij Vies Grijs Weer (she brought roses onto Gerrit's grave in dirty grey weather)

== Vacuum tube era ==
Popular in the days of vacuum-tube radios:

- Better Buy Resistors Or Your Grid Bias Voltages Go West. ("go west" means die)

== Offensive/outdated ==
The following historical mnemonics are generally considered offensive/outdated and inappropriate for current electronics training:

- Bad boys rape our young girls but Violet gives willingly. (Get Some Now)
- Bad boys run our young girls behind victory garden walls.
- Batman blows Robin on yon Gotham bridge; Very good Wayne! Get Superman Next!
- Batman blows Robin on yon Gotham bridge; Vows Gordon's next.
- Big boys rape our young girls but Violet goes willingly.
- Black boys rape our young girls because virgins go wild.
- Black boys rape our young girls behind victory garden walls.
- Black boys rape our young girls but Violet goes willingly.
- Black boys ride our young girls but virgins go without.
- Black boy raped our young girl, bam, virginity gone west.
- BaBy ROY of Great Britain is Very Gay With Gold & Silver Necklace
- Bad Boys Root Our Young Girls But Violet Goes Wanting

Casual use in an engineering class has been cited as evidence of the sexism faced by women in scientific fields. Latanya Arvette Sweeney, associate professor of computer science at Carnegie Mellon, mentions yet another as one reason why she felt alienated and eventually dropped out of MIT in the 1980s to form her own software company. In 2011, a teacher in the UK was reprimanded by the General Teaching Council for alluding to an offensive mnemonic and partial use of another. Violet Gave Willingly (2022) is a Canadian short documentary film about Deborah Dumka, and the sexism and misogyny that Dumka encountered when she went to university to study electrical engineering in the 1970s; the film takes its title from use of the mnemonic "Bad Boys Rape Our Young Girls But Violet Gives Willingly".
