= Degrassi: Whatever It Takes =

- Directed by: Lisa Rideout
- Screenplay by: Lisa Rideout; Celine Wong
- Produced by: Carrie Mudd; Erin Sharp
- Starring: Linda Schuyler; Kevin Smith; Drake
- Cinematography: Ann Tipper; Lulu Wei; Vinit Borrison
- Edited by: Peter Denes; Dave McMahon
- Production companies: Peacock Alley Entertainment; WildBrain
- Distributed by: WildBrain
- Release date: September 13, 2025 (TIFF)
- Running time: 111 minutes
- Country: Canada
- Language: English

Degrassi: Whatever It Takes is a 2025 Canadian documentary film directed by Lisa Rideout. It profiles the Degrassi franchise of teen drama television series, and includes interviews with producers, cast members and fans including co-creator Linda Schuyler, filmmaker Kevin Smith, and cast members Drake, Dayo Ade, Stefan Brogren, Amanda Deiseach, Maureen Deiseach, Shenae Grimes-Beech, Jake Epstein, Shane Kippel, Miriam McDonald, Stacie Mistysyn, Melinda Shankar, Amanda Stepto and Jordan Todosey.

The film premiered in the Special Presentations lineup at the 2025 Toronto International Film Festival on September 13, 2025.

== Controversy ==
On September 8, Schuyler launched a lawsuit against the film's producers, seeking to halt the film's premiere on the grounds that it purportedly contained defamatory statements alleging that cast members of Degrassi Junior High and Degrassi High were underpaid. The lawsuit was settled by September 10, allowing the premiere to proceed, after the producers agreed to add extra context to the film clarifying the additional benefits that Schuyler arranged for the cast members, including a retirement fund and an educational scholarship foundation.
