= Panta Mosleh =

Panta Mosleh is a Canadian-Kurdish-Iranian writer, director, producer, and actress based in Vancouver and Los Angeles. She gained recognition for co-directing the short film Hatch (2024), which won the Golden Yusr for Best Short Film at the Red Sea International Film Festival, and for directing the Hallmark Channel movie Christmas with the Singhs (2024).

== Career ==
She graduated from the Groundlings School of Comedy in Los Angeles and received the 2021 SNL scholarship. Mosleh has completed several film industry programs, including the Women in Director's Chair program, National Screen Institute EAVE development program, and Sundance writing for television and directing programs.

Mosleh has worked in the film and television industry for over a decade in various capacities, including as a production coordinator, production manager, producer, and director. She is a member of several industry organizations, including the Directors Guild of Canada (DGC) and the Canadian Media Producers Association (CMPA). She has directed multiple television movies for Hallmark, Lifetime, and Peacock, including Christmas with the Singhs (a seven-time Leo Awards nominee in 2025), 12 Dares of Christmas, and The Wedding Contest.

Mosleh is the founder of PK Studio Productions, and an alum of the Amazon MGM Writing program, Netflix BANFF Diversity of Voices Initiative, Reelworld’s Emerging 20 program, Warner x Access Diversity Showrunner Bootcamp program, the National Screen Institute, and EAVE On Demand Access programs for writing and directing television.

=== 2024: Hatch and international recognition ===
In 2024, Mosleh co-directed the short film Hatch. The film, about a young Afghan boy and his mother attempting to escape Afghanistan, premiered at the Vancouver International Film Festival and won the Golden Yusr for Best Short Film at the Red Sea International Film Festival. The film was also nominated for a Canadian Screen Award in 2025 for Best Performance in a Live Action Short Drama.

Her documentary film Pride & Prayer premiered at the 2025 Vancouver Queer Film Festival.

Mosleh both directed and starred in Pass the Salt, which premiered in 2026 as a six-part web series on OutTVGo, and as a feature film on Hollywood Suite.

== Filmography ==
=== Film ===
Year	Title	Role
2020	Hey SmartBox	Executive Producer, Director
2020	Cheating Death	Producer
2020	Dama Branca	Producer, Director
2021	Baba	Producer
2021	Happy Ever After	Executive Producer, Director, Writer
2021	Two Colours of Jahan	Executive Producer, Director
2022	Roads of Ithriyah	Co-Producer
2022	Consumer	Co-Producer
2022	The Faraway Place	Co-Producer
2022	Breakthrough	Executive Producer, Director, Writer
2024	Hatch	Executive Producer, Director
2025	Pride & Prayer	Director, writer, producer

=== Television ===
Year	Title	Role
2023	The Wedding Contest	Director
2023	Mother's Stolen Memories	Director
2023	12 Dares of Christmas	Director
2023	Amara	Executive Producer, Director
2024	Christmas with the Singhs	Director
2026	Pass the Salt	Parmiss Mansour; also director
