= Stephen Jenkinson =

Canadian writer and teacher (born 1954)

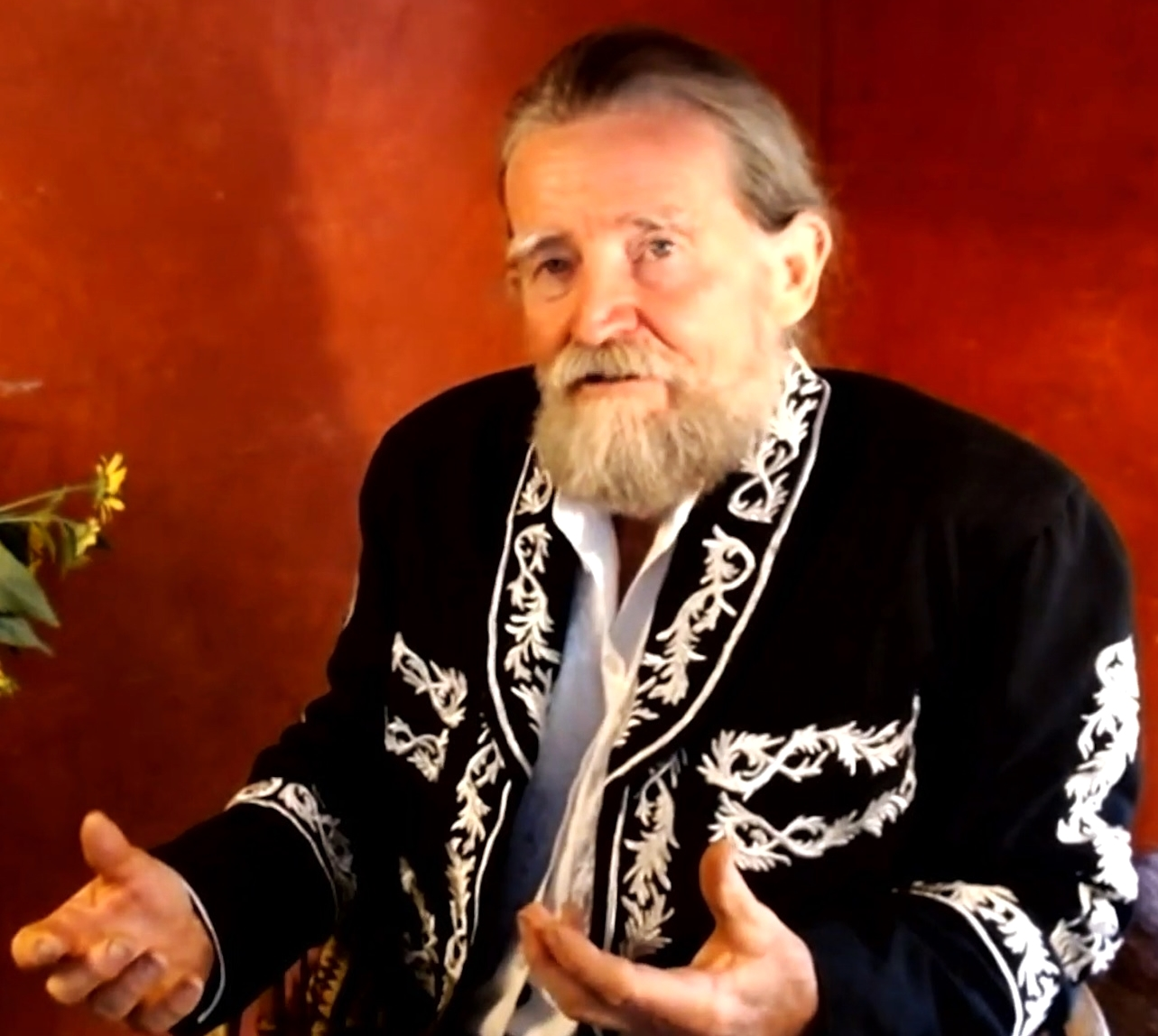
- Stephen Jenkinson in a 2021 video
- Born: 1954 (age 71–72); Scarborough, Ontario, Canada
- Education: Harvard Divinity School (Master of Theological Studies); University of Toronto (Master of Social Work)
- Occupations: Author; professor
- Spouse: Nathalie Roy
- Website: Official website

Stephen Jenkinson (born 1954) is a Canadian writer, teacher and grief literacy advocate.

== Palliative care career ==
Before 2010, Jenkinson directed palliative care at Mount Sinai Hospital of Toronto, Canada.

== Orphan Wisdom ==
Jenkinson founded the Orphan Wisdom School with his wife Nathalie Roy in 2010. “Orphan Wisdom” is what he calls a method of inquiry. He expresses his experience in seeing what modern Western people "suffer from most is culture failure, amnesia of ancestry and deep family story, phantom or sham rites of passage, no instruction on how to live with each other or with the world around us or with our dead or with our history." Orphan Wisdom is concerned with the origins and consequence of this state and contending with building skills to be in the presence of this fact.

Orphan Wisdom's teachings push against "'death phobia' and 'grief illiteracy'" to promote acceptance of death well before death to "participate emotionally in their deaths as they participate in other big life events".

A documentary film about Jenkinson and Orphan Wisdom, Griefwalker, was produced by the National Film Board of Canada and filmed over twelve years by Tim Wilson.

== Writing ==
First published in 2002, the book Money and the Soul's Desires: A Meditation makes a language to explore questions about the role of money in both a personal and a cultural context.

The 2009 book How it All Could Be is part meditation and part guided study, a companion to the film Griefwalker as well as a stand-alone workbook for anyone trying to approach dying with soul and intelligence intact.

The 2015 book Die Wise: A Manifesto for Sanity and Soul is Jenkinson's history, explication and exploration of his approach to coming to terms with death. Its dense and sometimes poetic prose is both a critique of dominant Western cultural practices and denials—in part gleaned from his years in the "death trade," as Jenkinson calls it—as well as what he has learned elsewhere, particularly from indigenous peoples. Jenkinson's ideas also have an affinity with Buddhist teachings, which have their origin in the Buddha's confronting the reality of suffering and death.

Published in 2018, the book Come of Age. The Case for Elderhood in a Time of Trouble makes the case that we must birth a new generation of elders, one poised and willing to be true stewards of the planet and its species.

== Publications ==
- Money and the Soul's Desires: A Meditation (2002)
- How it All Could Be (2009)
- Die Wise: A Manifesto for Sanity and Soul (2015)
- Come of Age. The Case for Elderhood in a Time of Trouble (2018)
- A Generation's Worth: Spirit Work while the Crisis Reigns (2021)
- Reckoning (2022) Co-authored with Kimberly Ann Johnson
- Matrimony: Ritual, Culture and the Heart's Work (2025)

== Films about Jenkinson ==
- Griefwalker (National Film Board of Canada, 2008) – written and directed by Tim Wilson; 70 mins
- Lost Nation Road (2019) – directed by Ian Mackenzie; 25 mins
