= Justin Simms =

Canadian film director and screenwriter (born 1973)

- Born: 1973 (age 52–53); Labrador City, Newfoundland and Labrador, Canada
- Occupations: Film director; Screenwriter; Film editor

Justin Simms (born 1973) is a Newfoundland and Labrador filmmaker, born in Labrador City, a co-founder of Newfound Films, and is now based in St. John's. His first feature film was Down to the Dirt, an adaptation of Joel Hynes's novel that Simms directed and co-wrote, which was named best Atlantic feature and best screenplay at the Atlantic Film Festival. He was the director of the film Hold Fast (2013) based on the novel of the same name by Newfoundland author Kevin Major. His most recent feature film adaptation is Away From Everywhere (2016), based on the Chad Pelley novel of the same name, which had its world premiere at the 2016 Cannes Film Festival as part of Telefilm Canada’s Perspectives Canada program.

His non-fiction credits include the National Film Board of Canada documentaries Hard Light (2011), winner of the Founder's Prize at Yorkton Film Festival; Danny (2014), co-directed with William D. MacGillivray; and the short Hand.Line.Cod. (2016), which premiered at the 2016 Toronto International Film Festival.

In 2024 he released Sons, a documentary film about his process of grappling with the question of how to model a positive masculinity to his young son Jude.

Smash & Grab: The Rebel Lens of Mike Jones, a documentary film about the filmmaking career of Mike Jones, premiered at the 2026 Atlantic International Film Festival.

== Filmography ==
=== Features ===
- Down to the Dirt (2008)
- Hold Fast (2013)
- Danny (2014) (co-directed with William D. MacGillivray)
- Away From Everywhere (2016)
- Hand.Line.Cod (2016)
- Becoming Labrador (2019)
- Sons (2024)
- Smash & Grab: The Rebel Lens of Mike Jones (2026)

=== Short films ===
- The Audience (2001)
- Heartless Disappearance Into Labrador Seas (2002)
- Ashore (2002)
- The King Hunt (2004)
- Face Machine (2006)
- Punch-Up at A Wedding (2006)
