= Manitoba Crafts Museum and Library =

- Established: 1930s
- Location: 329 Cumberland Avenue; Unit 1 Winnipeg, Manitoba; R3B 1T2
- Coordinates: 49.896991°N 97.145485°W
- Type: Handcrafts museum
- Collection size: 10,000
- Curator: Andrea Reichert
- Website: www.c2centreforcraft.ca

The Manitoba Crafts Museum and Library (MCML) is a craft museum located in Winnipeg, Manitoba dedicated to the preservation of handcrafts, Manitoba heritage, teaching the student, inspiring the artist, and promoting a way of life that values the handmade. The museum started in the 1930s after the establishment of the Manitoba branch of the Canadian Handicrafts Guild (later The Crafts Guild of Manitoba) in 1928. The museum is Canada's only museum of craft and holds a collection with roughly 10,000 artifacts and archival materials.

== History ==
The Manitoba Crafts Museum and Library has its origins in the early years of the Crafts Guild of Manitoba formed in 1928 as a branch of the Canadian Handicrafts Guild, and in 1933 that group established both a Permanent Collection and Library.

Over the years, volunteers worked to develop the collection, create exhibits, establish and deliver programming, and to care for the collection according to museum standards.

The Guild also established, in the early 1930s, a library of craft publications and patterns for use in workshops and by craftspeople. The Library grew steadily over the years, and in 1948 was named the Gladys Chown Memorial Library in memory of a President of the Guild who died while in office.

In the early 1990s volunteers worked to institute established library procedures and to develop the library into a more comprehensive resource.

In 1997 the Crafts Guild of Manitoba closed its doors, but the two collections were kept together and are managed by the Manitoba Crafts Museum and Library, an independent organization.

== Museum Collection ==
The MCML Museum Collection currently comprises over 10,000 artifacts and archival materials, including both historical and contemporary pieces. The collection includes bobbin lace, ceramics, crochet, embroidery, glass, knitting, needle lace, paper, quilts, rug hooking, sculpture, tatting, weaving, woodworking and more. The museum collection also has archival holdings of textual materials, photographs, and a slide collection. The MCML museum collections are catalogued in an in-house database. Portions of this catalogue are available on Artefacts Canada.

== Gladys Chown Memorial Library ==
The Gladys Chown Memorial Library is a vital part of the Manitoba Crafts Museum and Library. It was established in the 1930s as part of the Crafts Guild of Manitoba and officially named the Gladys Chown Memorial Library in 1948. The library is a unique collection containing materials dating as far back as the late 19th century; some foreign language books; and recently published books and periodicals. A significant portion of the holdings are unique in Canada. The library collects and preserves archival material, manuscripts, books, periodicals, photos, patterns, CDs, DVDs and any other paper or digital items relating to the history and practice of crafts. There are currently over 3,500 books, 1,500 magazines and journals, hundreds of vintage patterns, and a vertical file of more contemporary patterns, booklets and miscellaneous materials. The library is a lending library for eligible members of MCML and a research facility for all members of the public. The books, magazines, vertical file material and patterns are catalogued with an in-house database which is available to the public during open hours. Its holdings can also be searched online through AMICUS, a free national catalogue that shows the published materials held at Library and Archives Canada (LAC) as well as in over 1300 libraries across Canada.

== C2 Centre for Craft ==
The Manitoba Crafts Museum and Library is housed in the C2 Centre for Craft, a shared initiative and space of the Manitoba Crafts Museum & Library and the Manitoba Craft Council (MCC).

The C2 Centre for Craft is dedicated to presenting the best of contemporary and traditional craft in Manitoba. Located in an historic building in Winnipeg’s Exchange District, C2 features an exhibition gallery, shop, library, museum collection, and more.

== Affiliations ==
The museum is affiliated with: C2 Centre for Craft, CMA, CHIN, Manitoba Craft Council and Virtual Museum of Canada.
