= Take Me to Prom =

- Directed by: Andrew Moir
- Produced by: Andrew Moir
- Cinematography: Andrew Jeffrey
- Edited by: Graeme Ring
- Music by: Ben Fox
- Release date: April 2019 (Hot Docs)
- Running time: 19 minutes
- Country: Canada
- Language: English

Take Me to Prom is a Canadian documentary film, directed by Andrew Moir and released in 2019. The film traces the evolution of LGBTQ acceptance in society by asking a multigenerational selection of LGBTQ people to recount a story from their high school prom.

Storytellers in the film include Marc Hall, whose 2002 court case Hall v Durham Catholic School Board became a landmark LGBT rights case in Canada.

The film premiered at the 2019 Hot Docs Canadian International Documentary Festival. It was subsequently added to the CBC Gem streaming platform.

The film won the Canadian Screen Award for Best Short Documentary at the 8th Canadian Screen Awards in 2020.
