= Violet Gave Willingly =

2022 Canadian short documentary film

- Directed by: Claire Sanford
- Produced by: Claire Sanford
- Starring: Deborah Dumka
- Cinematography: Claire Sanford
- Edited by: Claire Sanford; Milena Salazar
- Music by: Sophia Sanford
- Production company: Toolshed Creative
- Release date: April 30, 2022 (Hot Docs)
- Running time: 23 minutes
- Country: Canada
- Language: English

Violet Gave Willingly is a Canadian short documentary film, directed by Claire Sanford and released in 2022. A profile of her mother, textile artist Deborah Dumka, the film centres on their conversations about the sexism and misogyny that Dumka encountered when she went to university to study electrical engineering in the 1970s.

The film takes its title from the use of the sexist "Bad Boys Rape Our Young Girls But Violet Gives Willingly" as a mnemonic for memorizing the order of the colours in resistors. The film had been in development for several years, with an excerpt from it highlighted by the International Documentary Association in November 2017 to mark the International Day for the Elimination of Violence against Women, despite the full film not being theatrically released until 2022.

The film had its public premiere at the 2022 Hot Docs Canadian International Documentary Festival. It was later screened at the 2022 Whistler Film Festival, where Sanford won the EDA Award for Best Female-Directed Short Film from the Alliance of Women Film Journalists.

The film was named to the Toronto International Film Festival's annual year-end Canada's Top Ten list for 2022. It received a Canadian Screen Award nomination for Best Short Documentary at the 12th Canadian Screen Awards in 2024.
