= Etiuda&Anima International Film Festival =

Animation film festival in Poland

International Film Festival Etiuda&Anima
- Status: active
- Genre: Film festival
- Frequency: Annually
- Location: Kraków
- Country: Poland
- Inaugurated: 1994

The International Film Festival Etiuda&Anima (Polish: Międzynarodowy Festiwal Filmowy Etiuda&Anima), is an animation film festival in Poland organized in Kraków continuously since 1994, and catering to independent producers, animation films professionals, and students of film and art schools from all over the world. Since 2010 the festival has also included workshops in scriptwriting, directing, cinematography, editing and animation, led by renown artists and pedagogues from foreign film schools.

The main two events of each festival are the actual competitions awarding the Golden, Silver and Bronze Dinosaur' prizes in two categories including feature and documentary etudes as well as experimental filmography. The Special Golden Dinosaur Award is presented to the best film school of the festival.

In the "Anima" part of the contest, Golden, Silver and Bronze Jabberwocky are awarded, with Special Golden Jabberwocky reserved for the best animated etude of the festival. The annual Special Golden Dinosaur is awarded to an outstanding artist turned pedagogue.

Since the beginnings, the programme of the festival includes a broad range of other events, offering an opportunity for animation artists to get acquainted with the new and old phenomena in this art-form, including prominent works in the history of animation and documentary. The events include screenings of contemporary short films and feature animated films also from the periphery of mainstream cinema.
