= Sunday Night Sex Show =

- Genre: Reality; Talk show
- Created by: Sue Johanson
- Presented by: Sue Johanson
- Starring: Sue Johanson
- Country of origin: Canada
- Original language: English

Original release
- Network: Q-107 (radio), W Network (TV)
- Release: 1996 – 2005

Related
- Talk Sex with Sue Johanson

The Sunday Night Sex Show was a live call-in Canadian television show hosted by Sue Johanson, which ran from 1996 to 2005. It aired on the W Network and was one of their most popular programs. Every week, callers would line up on the phone to talk to Johanson, about various topics from how to spice up one's sex life, to advice on how to select the right sex toy, to how to deal with various relationship issues.

For many years, reruns of the television show ran on the Oxygen Network in the United States, but American viewers were frustrated that they couldn't call in during the live airing in Canada. Eventually, a US version of the show, titled Talk Sex with Sue Johanson, was created.

Reasons for the Canadian cancellation were never given by either Johanson or the W Network. The US show ended with the May 11, 2008, episode. Johanson was very emotional at the conclusion of the show and joined on stage by her supporting cast.

Johanson hosted a similar phone-in show with the same name on Toronto radio station Q107 from 1984 to 1998, which was syndicated across Canada in later years, as well as a television phone-in show, Sex with Sue, on Rogers Cable's community channel in Toronto from 1985 to 1995.
