= Andrew Moir (filmmaker) =

Canadian documentary filmmaker

Andrew Moir is a Canadian documentary filmmaker. He is most noted for his 2019 film Take Me to Prom, which won the Canadian Screen Award for Best Short Documentary Film at the 8th Canadian Screen Awards in 2020. He was previously nominated two other times in the same category, for the films Just As I Remember at the 2nd Canadian Screen Awards in 2014, and Babe, I Hate to Go at the 6th Canadian Screen Awards in 2018.

Just As I Remember also won the Toronto Film Critics Association's Manulife Award for Best Student Film at the Toronto Film Critics Association Awards 2012.

His full-length feature debut Don't Come Searching, an expansion of Babe, I Hate to Go, was released in 2022.

Originally from London, Ontario, he is a film studies graduate of Toronto Metropolitan University.
