= Patty vs. Patty =

2022 Canadian short documentary film

- Directed by: Chris Strikes
- Written by: Chris Strikes
- Produced by: Maya Annik Bedward; Kate Fraser; Chris Strikes
- Starring: Orville Cummings
- Cinematography: Ashley Iris Gill
- Edited by: Maria Todorov-Topouzov
- Music by: Solitair
- Production companies: Callowgrove Entertainment; Third Culture Media
- Release date: February 17, 2022
- Running time: 19 minutes
- Country: Canada
- Language: English

Patty vs. Patty is a 2022 Canadian short documentary film, directed by Chris Strikes. The film recounts the true story of the "patty wars" of 1985, when restaurants in Toronto which served Jamaican patties had to fight a bureaucratic edict that they could not call their product a "patty", on the grounds that consumers might confuse them with hamburger patties, through a mixture of documentary footage and satirical dramatic reenactments performed by actor Orville Cummings.

The film premiered February 17, 2022, on CBC Gem and YouTube. It was also later screened at the 2022 Hot Docs Canadian International Documentary Festival, and the 2022 Vancouver International Film Festival.

== Awards ==
The film was nominated for Best Short Film at the 2022 Directors Guild of Canada awards.

The film won the Canadian Screen Award for Best Short Documentary at the 11th Canadian Screen Awards in 2023.
