= Danny (2014 film) =

- Film poster
- Directed by: Justin Simms; William D. MacGillivray
- Written by: William D. MacGillivray
- Produced by: Annette Clarke
- Cinematography: Andrew MacCormack
- Edited by: Justin Simms
- Music by: Darren Fung
- Production company: National Film Board of Canada
- Release date: September 13, 2014 (Atlantic Film Festival)
- Running time: 83 minutes
- Country: Canada
- Language: English

Danny is a 2014 National Film Board of Canada documentary film about former Newfoundland and Labrador premier Danny Williams, co-directed by Justin Simms and William D. MacGillivray, and produced by Annette Clarke.

The film took three years to produce, combining photos, archival footage, dramatic re-enactments and interviews with Williams, key staffers, his mother Teresita Galway Williams, and Newfoundland celebrities including Greg Malone. The film documents Williams' seven years as premier, including his clash with Prime Minister Stephen Harper over equalization payments and his subsequent Anything But Conservative campaign during the Canadian federal election. Danny also documents Williams' early years, which coincided with Newfoundland's entry into the Canadian Confederation, his career as a criminal lawyer as well as his success in business as the founder of Cable Atlantic, before entering politics. Williams also pokes fun at himself in the film, appearing in a Godfather parody with Newfoundland actor Gordon Pinsent.

Co-director Simms has stated that their intention was not only to make a biographical documentary, "but to frame it within Newfoundland’s very up and down post-confederation relationship with Canada."

== Release ==
The 84-minute film premiered in Halifax on September 13, 2014, at the Atlantic Film Festival. It then screened at Arts and Culture Centres across Newfoundland and Labrador, starting November 10, 2014. The film was selected to the 2015 Hot Docs Canadian International Documentary Festival, screening as part of its Big Ideas Series, with Williams in attendance.
