= Chris Strikes =

Canadian filmmaker

- Born: Toronto, Ontario, Canada
- Occupation: Filmmaker
- Years active: 2008 - current
- Known for: Patty vs. Patty
- Website: callowgroveent.com/films/

Chris Strikes is a Canadian filmmaker. He is best known for his 2022 short documentary Patty vs. Patty, that won a Canadian Screen Award for Best Short Documentary at the 11th Canadian Screen Awards in 2023.

== Career ==
Chris Strikes is a Jamaican-Canadian filmmaker based in Toronto. He began his career in the west-end of the city, shooting music videos for local artists. His work gained attention and his first music video by Ron Dias called "Toronto" played on Much Music and received a lot of praise, thus leading him to work with top Canadian and international artists such as Nelly Furtado, Kardinal Offishall, Machel Montano, and Dexta Daps.

As Strikes honed his skills behind the camera, he began to write, produce, and direct short narratives. His first short film, "One night a stranger", was screened at Cannes and other festivals around the world, winning awards for Best Music Video. This was followed by "Agape" written by frequent collaborator Director Ron Dias and starring and Emmanuel Kabongo. His next short film "Housekeeping", two more short films that also made it around the festival circuit, featuring up and coming Canadian actors such as Brandon Mcknight (CW The Flash).

Strikes’ first feature-length documentary, "Becoming A Queen", which provides an insider's view of Toronto's annual Caribbean Carnival and the King and Queen Show. The film has been well-received and serves as an educational piece for the youth and community, accurately portraying the most joyous time in the city.

Strikes latest CBC short doc "Patty vs. Patty" was well received The film was nominated for Best Short Film at the 2022 Directors Guild of Canada awards. .

== Filmography ==
- One night a Stranger (2013) - short film
- Agape (2014) - short film
- Housekeeping (2016) - short film
- Whole Lotta Love (2017) - short film
- Burning Rubber (2020) - short film
- Becoming a Queen (2021) - feature film documentary
- Patty vs. Patty (2022) - short doc film
