= Rohan Fernando (artist) =

Canadian film director and artist

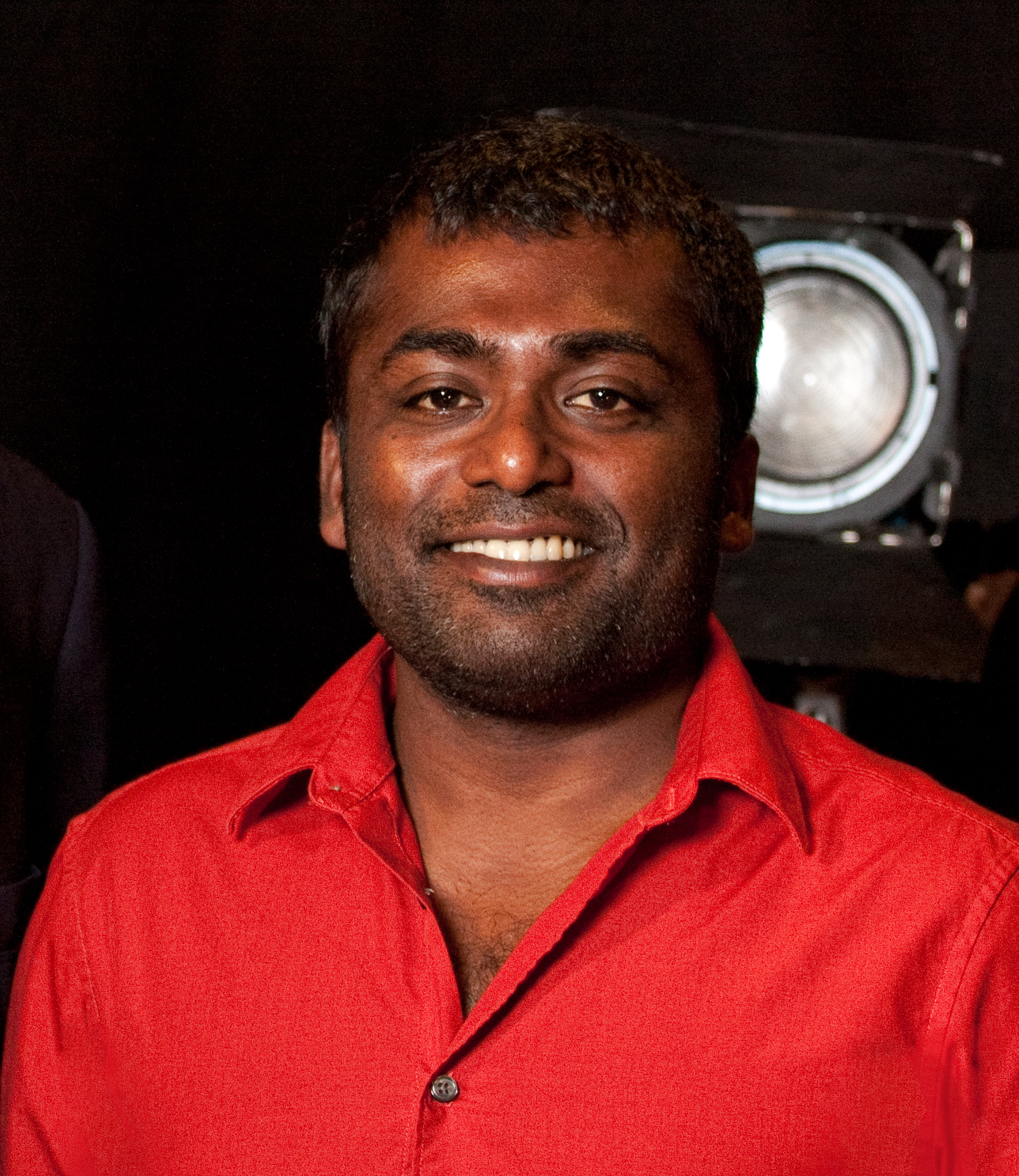
Rohan Fernando photographed in 2010 during the Atlantic Film Festival in Halifax

Rohan Fernando (also known as Cecil Fernando) is a Canadian visual artist, painter and film maker based in Halifax, Nova Scotia.

Fernando has directed five films for the National Film Board of Canada; The Chocolate Farmer, Blood & Water , Becoming Labrador , Trudeau's Other Children and Cecil's Journey about his ambivalence towards his identity and his trip to Jaffna, Sri Lanka, where Fernando was born. His short film, La Cucaracha, was the winner of the Guilty Pleasures Award from the 1996 Northwest Film & Video Festival. Fernando directed Snow in 2011, a story that follows the life of a Tsunami survivor played by Kalista Zackhariyas, which opened the ReelWorld Film Festival in Toronto after its world premiere at the Cinequest Film Festival in San Jose.
