= Bishop Sycamore High School scandal =

2021 American football scandal in Ohio, US

Bishop Sycamore High School
- Columbus, Ohio; United States

Information
- Type: Online
- Enrollment: 1 (Fall 2021)
- Colors: Black and white
- Athletics conference: Texas Christian Athletic League (until 2021)
- Team name: Centurions

An American football team named the Bishop Sycamore Centurions, based in Columbus, Ohio, purported to be the high school football team of Bishop Sycamore High School. The high school was advertised as an athletic sports training academy, but after a 58–0 blowout loss to IMG Academy that was televised on ESPN on August 29, 2021, there was increased scrutiny and an investigation into the school's existence. This investigation uncovered the identities and credentials of the team's administration. A former executive for the Ohio High School Athletic Association came forward to say that after three years of investigating the school, he was convinced that it was a "scam". A report published in December 2021 by the Ohio Department of Education concluded likewise.

The Centurions suffered lopsided losses in all six of their games in 2020, but their lack of success did not hinder their ability to schedule marquee games against elite preparatory, boarding, and high schools. The televised game against IMG Academy was the second time they had played the school, following a similar 56–6 loss in 2020. Their 2021 schedule was ranked the fourth most difficult of any high school team in the United States. In the wake of the scandal surrounding the game, Bishop Sycamore's remaining opponents canceled their games against the team.

== Pre-scandal background ==
Former player Aaron Boyd stated in an interview with Complex that athletes were recruited under the premise of the school being the "IMG of the Midwest". However, many of their student-athletes were older than typical high-school age, and there was no real campus. Instead, athletes were housed in a hotel for five months, with the only schooling being one visit to a public library. The school also struggled to maintain coaches, as 80% of the coaching staff resigned during the season, leaving the school with just two coaches and one player's mother. Boyd also alleged that the players were not provided with food, and some players resorted to stealing from supermarkets to eat.

Complex also conducted an anonymous interview with two former Bishop Sycamore students. They revealed that then head coach, Leroy Johnson, recruited the students with the prospect of "practicing at Ohio State's facilities". In reality, they held practices outside of an apartment complex that housed students at Ohio State. The team also did not have athletic trainers, which resulted in the athletes playing injured. The apartments housing the students frequently evicted them after Johnson failed to pay rent. Many players had already graduated from high school and there "were four or five kids that were 20, 21, [and] had children of their own". A number of players had legal issues; at one point so many players had active arrest warrants that the team could not fly to away games. One player joined the team immediately after being released from jail. The team also struggled with camaraderie; a former player claimed there were at least five fights at every practice.

=== Christians of Faith Academy ===
The school was originally founded as Christians of Faith Academy (COF) in 2018. A federal investigation into COF was opened regarding use of counterfeit currency, credit and debit card fraud, computer fraud, and other crimes. It was shut down after just one season and became Bishop Sycamore. Leroy Johnson, the former head coach, claims that they had ties to the Third District of the African Methodist Episcopal Church (AME church) and had plans to build a "massive campus". Johnson was a business-development director for the Richard Allen Group, the financial arm of the AME church. Johnson later used COF and the church's name during his attempts to sell life insurance. The AME church has denied having any connection with the school, but an investigation by The Columbus Dispatch found a trail of emails and bank statements that documented the connections between the AME church and the school, which was initially established in an effort to provide opportunities to disadvantaged youth. Whatever ties the AME church had to the school were severed by fall 2018.

As Christians of Faith, the team played its inaugural season in 2018; of 12 scheduled games, the team won two, lost eight, and forfeited two (including its first scheduled game against IMG Academy).

=== YouthBuild ===
Bishop Sycamore tried to associate with YouthBuild Columbus Community School. However, when Bishop Sycamore tried to promote themselves as working with YouthBuild, they decided to part ways and, eventually, sent a cease-and-desist letter to Bishop Sycamore that the two organizations are not to be affiliated with one another. In 2019, Bishop Sycamore was accused of "fielding players who [were] older than 18 or [had] used up their allotted four years of eligibility." These are against the rules of the National Federation of State High School Associations (NFHS) and multiple state high school associations, prompting Point Pleasant High School in West Virginia to cancel their game against Bishop Sycamore due to liability concerns.

=== 2019–2020 ===
The football team known as Bishop Sycamore first played in 2019, during which they went 4–5 against a variety of smaller schools, none of them located in Ohio. On August 27, 2019, they were removed from playing against Mainland High School in the Freedom Bowl, a private football tournament in Milton, Georgia, for "breach of contract" following failure to submit a roster and book hotel rooms in time.

In 2020, Bishop Sycamore offered online classes through an organization called Graduation Alliance, but the classes were discontinued after five months as a result of Bishop Sycamore failing to provide payments for the organization's services. Meanwhile, the team exploited cancellations stemming from the COVID-19 pandemic to land matches against marquee teams needing to fill their schedule; they went 0–6 that year and were outscored 227–42. Their schedule consisted of high school powerhouses like Massillon Washington High School, McCallie School, St. Edward High School, Saint Ignatius High School, and IMG Academy; that year, IMG Academy defeated Bishop Sycamore 58–0. NBC News noted that such elite high school programs struggle to find opponents from outside their league or geographic area, as few were willing to travel long distances to face a far superior opponent. Bishop Sycamore likely had little difficulty convincing teams to schedule a game.

=== 2021 season ===
Bishop Sycamore came into the 2021 season with the fourth toughest schedule in the nation. They also tried to raise $20,000 to fund the school's football program via GoFundMe, but received only $140. Prior to their highly publicized 2021 matchup against IMG Academy, Bishop Sycamore had played two games during the 2021 season, losing their first game by a score of 38–0 to Archbishop Hoban High School on August 19, 2021. Just two days before playing IMG Academy, Bishop Sycamore had played a second game against Sto-Rox High School on August 27, 2021, which they had lost 19–7.

=== Coach Leroy Johnson ===
Roy Johnson
Coaching career (HC unless noted)
- 2019–2021: Bishop Sycamore

Administrative career (AD unless noted)
- 2018: Christians of Faith Academy

Head coaching record
- Overall: 0–9 (high school)

Leroy Johnson Jr., also known as Roy Johnson, is an American football coach who most recently served as the head coach of the Bishop Sycamore Centurions.

During 2018, Johnson was signed to the Christians of Faith Academy as the athletic director and assistant coach. During the end of the season, the team collapsed due to financial reasons. In 2020, Johnson rebranded the Christians of Faith Academy to Bishop Sycamore. On August 29, 2021, the team played IMG Academy on ESPN but lost 58–0 as Johnson was on the verge of getting fired. After the game, Johnson came under heavy scrutiny. It was revealed that there was an active arrest warrant for Johnson relating to "fraudulent misrepresentation, conversion, and unjust enrichment". Johnson also faced a civil lawsuit filed by ARN Hospitality, which claimed he owed them $110,685 for not paying any portion of the bill from the hotel where the players were housed. He faced similar lawsuits for failure to pay from a busing company and a football helmet manufacturer. Johnson had also taken out a loan of $100,000 but never repaid the bank.

Former athletes at Bishop Sycamore also stated that Johnson's football play calls all came from Madden NFL video games and that the team attacked a homeless man who attempted to break into Johnson's car. The only class offered to students was a religious class taught by Johnson.

== 2021 IMG Academy football game ==
2021 Bishop Sycamore vs. IMG Academy football game
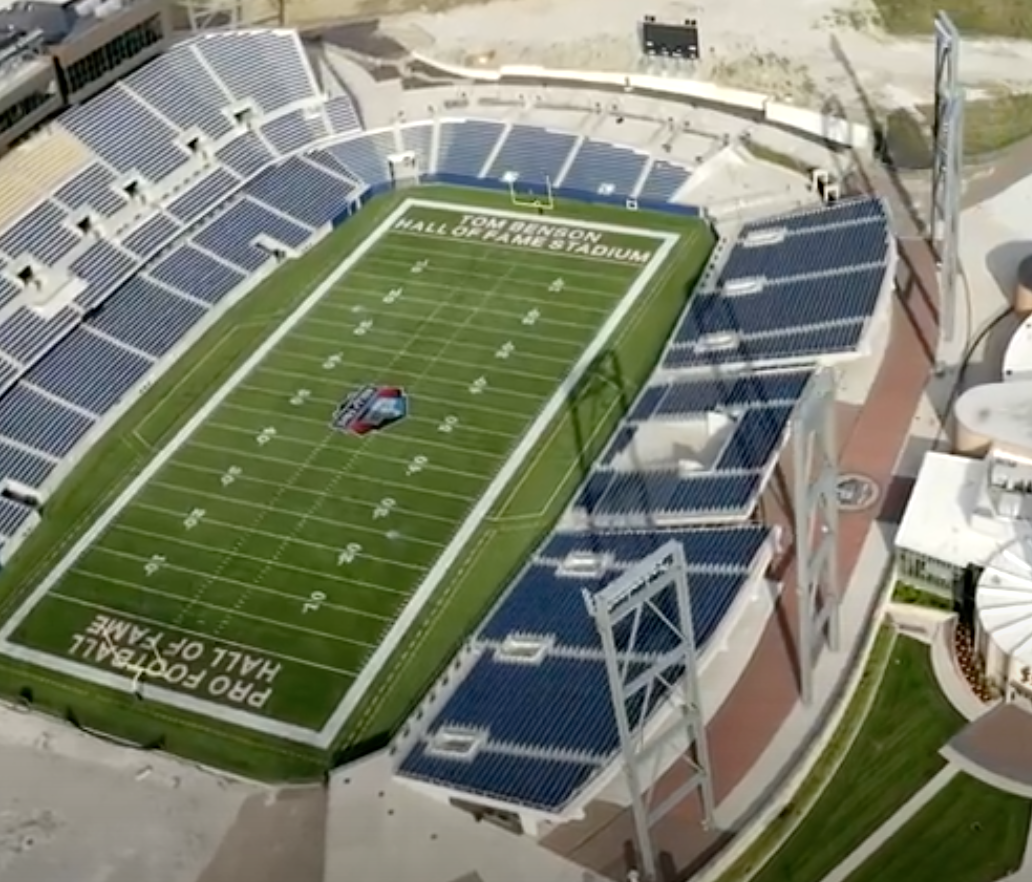
- The game was played at Tom Benson Hall of Fame Stadium in Canton, Ohio.
IMG Academy (0–0)	Bishop Sycamore (0–2)
58	0
Head coach: Pepper Johnson	Head coach: Leroy Johnson
	1	2	3	4	Total
IMG	23	14	7	14	58
BSH	0	0	0	0	0
- Date: August 29, 2021
- Stadium: Tom Benson Hall of Fame Stadium; Canton, Ohio
- Referee: Chris Glass

TV in the United States
- Network: ESPN
- Announcers: Anish Shroff and Tom Luginbill

Bishop Sycamore gained national attention when they played high school football powerhouse IMG Academy on August 29, 2021. The game was aired on ESPN as the finale of the 2021 ESPN High School Kickoff series, a weekend of high school football showcases televised by ESPN's networks featuring prominent teams, nationally ranked prospects, and players that have committed to playing Division I FBS college football. The games were booked by the company Paragon Marketing, which has historically served as a partner for ESPN's high school events. Paragon was unable to find a team willing to play IMG, so they outsourced their efforts to a man named Joe Maimon, who runs a company called Prep Gridiron Logistics. Maimon contacted 200 schools to play IMG, and Bishop Sycamore was the only school willing to play against them. The game was expected by many to be a game between two elite programs but was far from competitive. IMG Academy was dominant throughout the entire game, winning 58–0 in their first shutout since 2019.

As the lopsided contest ensued, play-by-play announcer Anish Shroff and color commentator Tom Luginbill began to question the legitimacy of the Centurions on-air. They revealed that ESPN had been unable to verify claims that its roster contained NCAA Division I college prospects, and they could not find any mention of Bishop Sycamore or its players in any recruiting databases. Shroff wondered how Bishop Sycamore was booked for a nationally televised game against IMG – the "most talented prep team in the country". To Shroff's mind, the game appeared to be such a mismatch that "there's got to be a point now where you're worried about health and safety". Luginbill agreed, saying that the game could potentially get "dangerous" due to Bishop Sycamore's apparent lack of depth.

One member of the ESPN production team likened the game to "four and five star recruits against a JV team". After IMG scored 23 points in the first quarter, organizers for the event spoke to Johnson about calling the game via mercy rule, but he refused. Johnson also refused to allow a running clock even when it was apparent the game was out of hand. It subsequently emerged that ESPN officials had greenlit the broadcast despite Bishop Sycamore unable to provide rudimentary information about the school and the team, contrary to longstanding practice for high schools appearing on the network. For instance, Johnson did not show up for a scheduled virtual production meeting two days before the game. ESPN only got a fact sheet about the school hours before the game. Several members of ESPN's production staff thought something was amiss when several names on Bishop Sycamore's roster did not check out, but the game went ahead as scheduled.

After the game, a Fairfield Inn & Suites, where Bishop Sycamore stayed while in Canton, accused the team of attempting to use two invalid checks for $3,596 in order to pay for 25 rooms. The team was also charged $750 for room damages. The Canton Police Department announced they were investigating the school for forgery.

== Aftermath ==
Coach Leroy Johnson was fired on August 31 in the aftermath of the IMG Academy game, with founder Andre Peterson taking over the operation. Peterson maintained the operation was legitimate, noting that he had enrolled his own son in the school. However, former players for Johnson have said, "He's never gonna leave that program. He might say he's not taking the coaching job. He might lie to make the public get off his back. But Roy is not gonna get out of that. He's gonna be in their ears at all times." Johnson was replaced by Tyren Jackson as the school's football head coach. In an interview with Columbus TV station WCMH-TV following his hiring, Jackson acknowledged that the organization was not a school and should not have identified as one:

We are not a school. That's not what Bishop Sycamore is, and I think that's what the biggest misconception about us was, and that was our fault. Because that was a mistake on paperwork.

In the same interview, Jackson stated the team was still hoping to schedule more games in 2021, noting that the team's newfound notoriety would ensure that the first opponent who agreed to play Bishop Sycamore would make "national news" by doing so.

Following the game, fans and media outlets began to question whether Bishop Sycamore was a real high school. During the 2020–21 school year, the Ohio Department of Education listed Bishop Sycamore as a "non-chartered, non-tax supported school"; the school was not listed at all for the 2021–22 year. The state listed a P.O. box as its mailing address, and its physical address as being a sports training facility in Columbus. The Roman Catholic Diocese of Columbus had no record of any bishop named Sycamore, nor any parochial schools by that name in their diocese, throughout their history. The school's website contained blank "About Us" and "Staff" pages, as additionally, it was not part of the Ohio High School Athletic Association (OHSAA); it instead played in the Texas Christian Athletic League, which included the team in its Division 6A, a "national division" open to teams outside Texas (by late October, the TCAL had dropped Bishop Sycamore from the league). In 2020, the school claimed an enrollment of only three students. Ohio Governor Mike DeWine announced that the Ohio Department of Education would be opening an investigation into the school's educational operations. In the wake of that investigation, the three remaining schools still slated to play Bishop Sycamore called off the games. The OHSAA later stated that, even if Bishop Sycamore were not a bona fide high school, teams in their jurisdiction would still be allowed to schedule and play them, as no rule in the OHSAA bylaws requires OHSAA teams' opponents to be affiliated with any high school. Such games would be considered exhibition games for the purposes of record keeping. The investigation conducted by the Ohio Department of Education into Bishop Sycamore was released on December 17, 2021, and found that the school failed to meet educational standards, failed to provide a physical location for classes to meet, and did not employ any teachers. It was indicated that the report went on to state that Bishop Sycamore was likely a scam, and recommend that the Ohio Attorney General consider legal action against the school's administrators.

Player safety concerns were also raised, after it was discovered that Bishop Sycamore had played a Friday night game just two days earlier against Sto-Rox High School in Pennsylvania (which they lost 19–7). The game featured many of the same players as their game against IMG Academy. Rashid Ghazi, president of Paragon Marketing, said that the game would have been canceled had anyone known Bishop Sycamore was already playing a game the preceding Friday. After the game, ESPN released a statement placing responsibility for the incident on Paragon, saying that Paragon had given assurances "that they will take steps to prevent this kind of situation from happening moving forward". Duncanville High School in Duncanville, Texas, originally stated that it intended on following through with its scheduled game against Bishop Sycamore on September 10 despite the allegations of impropriety, but they later decided to cancel the game and seek a new opponent.

In July 2023, Johnson filed for bankruptcy in Ohio, claiming to have less than $50,000 in assets and over $300,000 in liabilities, most related to his football programs; some of his debts were not included in the filing.

=== Accusations of being a scam ===
Ben Ferree, the former assistant director of Officiating and Sport Management at the OHSAA, told Awful Announcing that he spent "the better part of three years" investigating Bishop Sycamore and its previous incarnation, COF Academy. He first looked into the school when he noticed that it played a number of OHSAA member schools. Standard practice called for Ferree to contact any non-OHSAA member school to verify that school's enrollment for purposes of playoff seeding. However, Ferree grew suspicious when COF Academy claimed to have 750 boys on its roll; according to Ferree, if a newly opened school in the state capital had that many boys, he and other OHSAA officials would have known about it. After unsuccessful attempts to verify that COF Academy was what it claimed to be, the OHSAA declared that COF Academy was not a legitimate school, which ultimately led to its charter being revoked in 2018. Ferree ultimately concluded that Bishop Sycamore existed as a money-making venture for Johnson. He told Awful Announcing that Johnson would agree to play powerhouse high schools, provided that the school paid for Bishop Sycamore's travel expenses. However, Johnson would pocket the travel stipend for personal use.

=== Documentaries ===
Comedian Kevin Hart announced that his production company HartBeat Productions, Complex Networks and others would be producing a docuseries which will cover "how the school and this game fooled the world and became front page news".

Former NFL player Michael Strahan's production company, SMAC Entertainment, announced in September 2021 that they had secured the rights to interview Leroy Johnson for a documentary about Bishop Sycamore. SMAC later joined forces with Two Distant Strangers directors Travon Free and Martin Desmond Roe, Adam McKay's Hyperobject Industries, Spencer Paysinger's Moore Street Productions, Boat Rocker Media, and The Athletic to produce an HBO Sports documentary titled BS High, which was announced as being in production in August 2022, and premiered at the Tribeca Film Festival in June 2023.

=== 2023 attempt to return to football ===
The Richmond Times-Dispatch reported that Bishop Sycamore would return as a team and would play a game against Life Christian Academy on November 9, 2023 at Virginia State University. Life Christian Academy's head coach David Fitzgerald said that "Bishop Sycamore staff is seeking to revitalize its reputation" and they "have worked with a very reputable company that matches high school football games up." Life Christian Academy has faced challenges in scheduling football games because of concerns with the school's academic and eligibility standards. The company that organized the game is Prep Gridiron Logistics, which is run by Joe Mamione, and organized the matchup between Bishop Sycamore and IMG Academy. In a statement, Prep Gridiron Logistics stated that the game had not yet been finalized. On November 8, 2023, Life Christian Academy announced that the matchup had fallen through due to lack of equipment.

== See also ==
- List of hoaxes
- Plainfield Teachers College
- Maguire University
- H. Rochester Sneath
- Carlos Kaiser (footballer)
