= Jawanmard Paiez =

Afghan actor

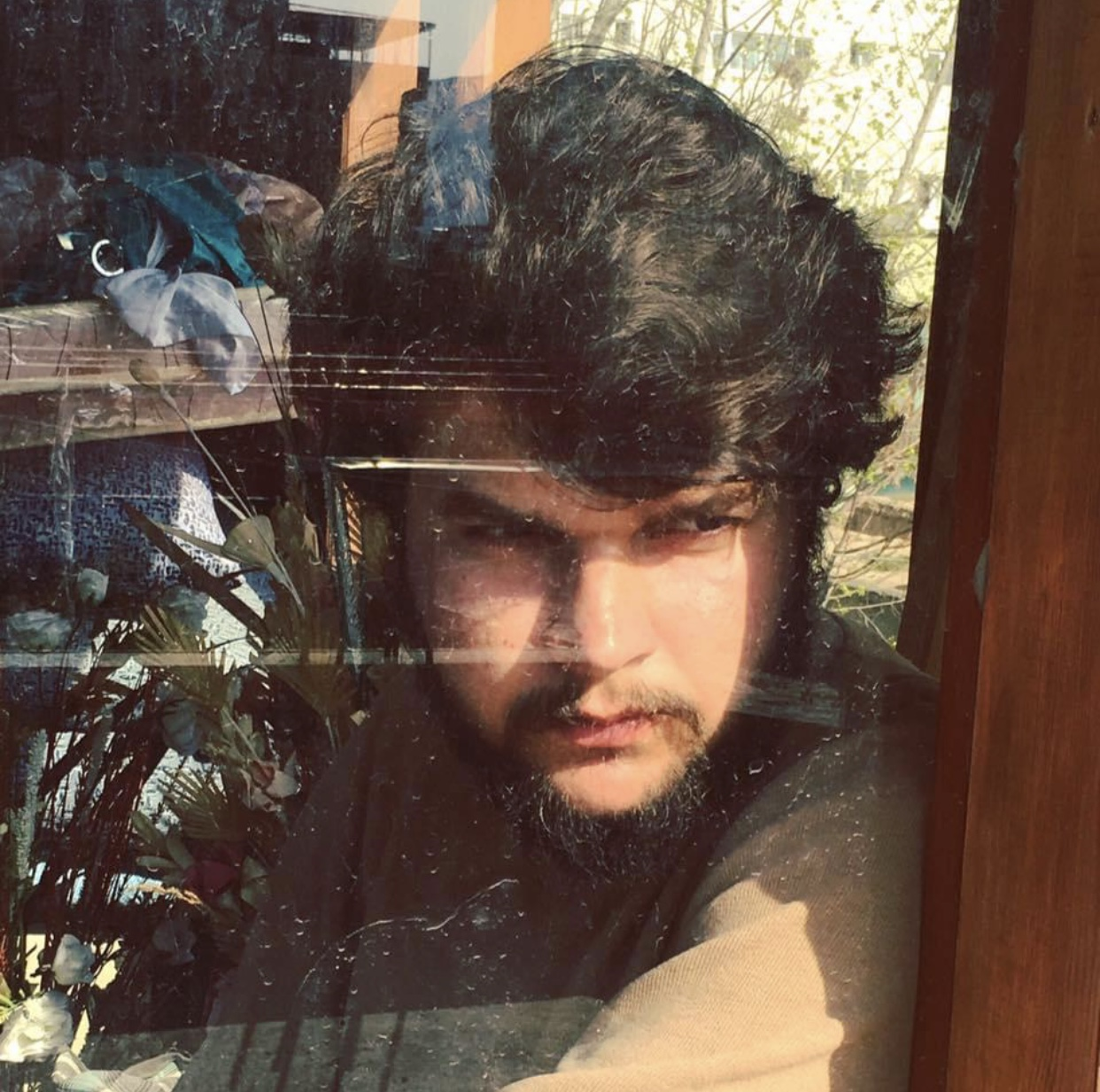
- Born: 19 January 1999 (age 27); Kabul, Afghanistan
- Education: Kabul University
- Occupations: Actor; writer; filmmaker
- Years active: 2003–present
- Known for: Buzkashi Boys; Opium War; Earth and Ashes
- Father: Hamayoon Paiez

Jawanmard Paiez (born 19 January 1999) is an Afghan actor recognized for his role in Buzkashi Boys (2012), an Oscar-nominated short film, and Opium war (2008) which received Golden Marc’Aurelio Critics’ Award for Best Film at the Rome Film Festival.

== Early life ==
Paiez was born in Panjshir Province of Afghanistan and raised in a middle-class family in Kabul. His father Homayoon Paiez and his uncle are well-known actors, and his siblings have also worked in Afghan cinema. Paiez began acting at a young age and participated in several productions before gaining international attention.

== Career ==
Paiez has shared his interest in working on films with a focus on realism and narrative quality. He has expressed a preference for international cinema over Afghanistan's domestic productions. In media interviews, Paiz has cited several Western actors as influences on his aspirations, and he has discussed his hopes of participating in international film projects.

=== Buzkashi Boys ===
Paiez's performance in Buzkashi Boys marked a pivotal moment in his career. Directed by Sam French and produced by Ariel Nasr, the film follows the friendship between two boys from different social classes in Kabul who share a fascination with buzkashi, a traditional Afghan sport.

In the film, Paiez plays a street kid who forms a friendship with a blacksmith's son, played by Fawad Mohammadi. While filming one scene on the streets of Kabul, Paiz was mistaken by a relative for a beggar, as he had dressed in tattered clothing and waved an incense burner for the role.

The film was shot entirely in Kabul, facing logistical challenges such as severe weather and navigating security in a volatile environment. It was produced in Dari, Afghanistan's primary language, as part of the Afghan Film Project—a program aimed at rebuilding the country's film industry by training local cast and crew members.

Buzkashi Boys became the first film shot in Afghanistan to receive a nomination for Best Live Action Short Film at the 85th Academy Awards. The film's nomination was seen as a step forward for Afghan cinema, which had been constrained for years due to political instability and restrictions on artistic expression.

=== Opium War (2008 film) ===
Paiez appeared in Opium War (2008), directed by Siddiq Barmak. The black comedy follows two American soldiers stranded in the Afghan desert and their encounter with an Afghan family of opium farmers. The film, shot entirely in Afghanistan, faced logistical challenges, including attempts to eradicate the poppy field used for the set. Opium War gained international recognition, winning the Golden Marc’Aurelio Critics' Award at the Rome Film Festival and being submitted as Afghanistan's entry for the 2009 Academy Awards.

=== Earth and Ashes (2004) ===
Earth and Ashes (2004) is an Afghan film directed by Atiq Rahimi, based on his novel Earth and Ashes, with the screenplay adapted by Iranian writer Kambuzia Partovi. The film follows an elderly man named Dastagir, who, along with his deaf grandson Yassin, journeys along the Kabul-Hairatan road to deliver tragic news to his estranged son at a coal mine. The film premiered in the "Un Certain Regard" section at the 2004 Cannes Film Festival and won the Golden Dhow award at the Zanzibar Film Festival in 2005.
