= Sadaf =

Sadaf or Sadaffe is a feminine given name and surname of Arabic origin. Notable people with the name include:

== Given name ==
- Sadaf Aashan (born 1975), Pakistani actress and producer
- Sadaf Asgari (born 1997), Iranian actress
- Sadaf Espahbodi (born 1994), Iranian actress
- Sadaf Farooqi, British physician
- Sadaf Foroughi (born 1976), Iranian filmmaker, video artist and film editor
- Sadaf Hussain (born 1989), Pakistani cricketer
- Sadaf Jaffer (born 1983), American academic and politician
- Sadaf Kanwal (born 1993), Pakistani actress and model
- Sadaf Khadem (born 1995), Iranian boxer
- Sadaf Malaterre (born 1969), Pakistani fashion designer
- Sadaf Rahimi, Afghan female boxer
- Sadaf Shamas (born 1998), Pakistani cricketer
- Sadaf Siddiqui (born 1985), Pakistani track and field sprint athlete
- Sadaf Taherian (born 1988), Iranian actress and model
- Sadaffe Abid, Pakistani entrepreneur

== Surname ==
- Gulraiz Sadaf (born 1989), Pakistani cricketer
- Sidra Sadaf, Pakistani female cyclist
