= Opium War (2008 film) =

- Promotional poster
- Directed by: Siddiq Barmak
- Written by: Siddiq Barmak
- Produced by: Siddiq Barmak
- Starring: Peter Bussian; Marina Golbahari; Joe Suba; Fawad Samani; Jawanmard Paiez
- Cinematography: Georgi Dzalayev
- Edited by: Michele Hickson
- Music by: Daler Nazarov
- Production company: Finecut
- Distributed by: Finecut
- Release date: October 2008
- Running time: 90 mins
- Country: Afghanistan
- Languages: Persian; English

Opium War (Persian: جنگ تریاک) is a 2008 Afghan black comedy film written and directed by Golden Globe winner Afghan filmmaker Siddiq Barmak. The film was shot entirely in Afghanistan and revolves around the experiences of two American soldiers (Peter Bussian and Joe Suba), who crash their helicopter in the Afghan desert and find themselves at the mercy of the natural elements and an eclectic family of Afghan opium farmers.

In order to create a realistic setting of an opium poppy field, Barmak had to obtain permission from the Afghan government to plant the crop because growing opium poppies was declared illegal in Afghanistan in 2002. Several challenges were faced by the filmmakers, with regard to the poppy field, before filming was completed. Most notably, Afghan poppy eradication teams attempted to destroy his film set twice and the lack of rain forced Barmak to drill a well for irrigation as well as to bring in water tankers from as far away as 30 km.

The film was Afghanistan's official submission to the 2009 Academy Awards. Opium War was screened at several international film festivals, including the 2008 edition of Rome Film Festival, where it won the Golden Marc’Aurelio Critics’ Award for Best Film.
