= Martin Desmond Roe =

American film producer

- Education: University of Southern California (MFA, Cinema-Television, 2008); Somerville College, Oxford (B.A., Classics, 2001)
- Occupations: Film director, film producer, screenwriter
- Years active: 2009–present
- Known for: Buzkashi Boys, Tom vs Time, Breaking2, Kobe Bryant's Muse
- Website: dirtyrobber.com

Martin Desmond Roe is a British-American film and television director, writer, and producer. He is best known for Buzkashi Boys (2012), Kobe Bryant's Muse (2015), Breaking2 (2017), Tom vs Time (2018), and We are the Champions (2020). Roe is the founder and Creative Director of Dirty Robber, a Los Angeles–based production company.

Martin Roe's short film Two Distant Strangers was met with critical acclaim; at the 93rd Academy Awards, it received the Academy Award for Best Live Action Short Film.

== Education ==
Born in Bristol, England, Roe studied Latin and Ancient Greek at Somerville College, Oxford, graduating in 2001 with a BA in Classics. He moved to Los Angeles and entered the USC School of Cinematic Arts, earning an MFA in Cinema and Television in 2008.

== Career ==
Roe became interested in filmmaking and storytelling while staging plays during his time at Oxford. After finishing USC film school he founded Dirty Robber, a production company. His first major success came in 2012 when Roe co-wrote the screenplay for Buzkashi Boys, a short film that was directed by Sam French. Written in a week, on location in Kabul, Afghanistan, the film was inspired by the true life story of Fawad Mohammidi, a homeless 14 year old street vendor and explored his friendship with another boy and their love for the traditional horse sport Buzkashi. Buzkashi Boys gained critical acclaim winning numerous film festival awards, and was nominated for the 2013 Best Live Action Short Film at the Academy Awards.

In 2017, after directing a number of commercials for Nike, Inc., Roe was invited as creative lead on Breaking2 sports documentary, a joint project of Nike and National Geographic in association with Dirty Robber. The documentary short followed three world class athletes, Eliud Kipchoge, Lelisa Desisa, and Zersenay Tadese as they attempted to run a marathon in under two hours. Breaking2 won several awards in advertising industry including a Gold Lion at the Cannes Lions International Festival of Creativity. Roe also took part as an executive producer of 6 episodes for Tom vs Time, a collaborative web television series project directed by Gotham Chopra, which won Emmy Award for Outstanding Serialized Sports Documentary (NBC Sports). In 2020, he co-directed the short film Two Distant Strangers, about police killings in the United States, which stars Joey Bada$$ and Andrew Howard, and which won the Academy Award for Best Live Action Short in 2021.

In 2023, Roe co-directed alongside Travon Free, BS High a documentary for HBO, revolving around the Bishop Sycamore High School scandal.

Roe is an owner and creative director of Dirty Robber Productions, a Los Angeles-based company with the focus on documentaries, T.V series, shows and sports events. Among Dirty Robber's most notable productions are Religion of Sports, Tom vs Time, Kobe Bryant’s Muse (in collaboration with Kobe Inc.), Why We Fight (ESPN+), Wiz Khalifa: Behind the Cam (DIRECTV), and We are the Champions, a documentary series about various contests and sports traditions.

== Plagiarism allegation ==
In April 2021, Cynthia Kao posted a video on the social media site TikTok alleging that Roe's film, Two Distant Strangers (2020), plagiarized a short film she had directed in December 2016 titled Groundhog Day For a Black Man. The contents of Kao's film were similar to the plot of Two Distant Strangers, which are both about a black man trying to relive the same day over and over until he can survive a police altercation. Furthermore, in 2020, during the George Floyd protests, social media news outlet NowThis contacted Kao about featuring the film on their Facebook and Instagram pages. The following year, Netflix released Two Distant Strangers in collaboration with NowThis, excluding any credit of Kao's name or that she had anything to do with the original idea for the movie in any way. NowThis responded to the claims, citing the fact that the film was independently conceived and in final production before they became involved, disputing any connection to Kao.

== Filmography ==
Year	Title	Credit	Notes
2023	BS High	Co-director	Documentary film
2020	Two Distant Strangers	Co-director	Short
2020	We are the Champions	Executive producer (6 episodes); Director (2 episodes)	TV documentary series
2019	Wiz Khalifa: Behind the Cam	Director (5 episodes)	TV documentary mini-series
2019	Why We Fight	Executive producer (15 episodes)	TV documentary series
2018	Shut Up and Dribble	Executive producer (3 episodes)	TV documentary series
2018	Tom vs Time	Executive producer (6 episodes)	Documentary web television series (Emmy Award Winner)
2017	Breaking2	Director	TV movie documentary Cannes Gold Lions Winner; Co-production of National Geographic Studios and Dirty Robber Productions
2017	Uninterrupted Presents	Executive producer (2 episodes)	TV series documentary
2016	Religion of Sports	Executive producer (18 episodes); Director; Writer	TV series documentary
2015	Kobe Bryant's Muse	Producer	TV movie documentary
2012	Buzkashi Boys	Co-producer; Co-writer	Short
