= List of American football films =

The following is a list of American football films.

== List ==
Title	Year	Genre	Notes
Two Minutes to Go	1921	Comedy	Silent film in which a star of his college football team (Charles Ray) is forced to work as a milkman when his father's business begins to fail. Now considered a lost film.
The Freshman	1925	Comedy	Silent film with Harold Lloyd as a water boy who gets to play his in team's big game.
The Plastic Age	1925	Drama	Silent film with Clara Bow as a flapper who lures a star football player into a party lifestyle.
Brown of Harvard	1926	Drama	Silent film about Harvard football player, based on a Broadway play.
The Kick-Off	1926	Drama	"A photoplay of college life, replete with the romance of the campus, and an especially thrilling football game."
The Quarterback	1926	Comedy	A college athlete spends 27 years trying to defeat his school's arch-rival.
The Drop Kick	1927	Drama	A man's suicide damages a football player's reputation.
The College Widow	1927	Comedy	A coach's daughter helps Atwater College land a star player.
West Point	1927	Drama	A cadet fights his coach, insults the academy, and risks losing his girlfriend (Joan Crawford).
The College Hero	1927	Drama	A jealous teammate trips Carver College's football star and injures him.
Salute	1929	Drama	Brothers become opponents for Army-Navy game.
So This Is College	1929	Comedy	College teammates Biff and Eddie compete for the love of lovely Babs Baxter
The Forward Pass	1929	Comedy	A co-ed (Loretta Young) persuades a reluctant star to return to the gridiron.
College Hounds	1930	Comedy	Short film of "All Barkie Dogville Comedies" series in which trained dogs play football players.
Maybe It's Love	1930	Musical	A college president's daughter (Joan Bennett) brings in ringers to win a big game.
Maker of Men	1931	Drama	A football player finds it hard to please his father, who is also his coach.
The Galloping Ghost	1931	Serial	A 12-chapter serial with Red Grange confronting a scandal at "Clay College."
Touchdown	1931	Drama	Coach (Richard Arlen) weighs an injured player's health against his own need to win.
Freddy the Freshman	1932	short	Freddy the Freshman, "the freshest kid in town" and a canine "big man on campus", crash a college pep rally and becomes stars of the campus football game.
Horse Feathers	1932	Comedy	A Marx Brothers farce about college football.
That's My Boy	1932	Drama	A college hero demands $50,000 to keep playing football, but his stockbroker loses it.
The All American	1932	Drama	After a football player ruins his life, he keeps his brother from making the same mistake.
70,000 Witnesses	1932	Mystery	His teammate is murdered during a game, and Buck Buchanan suspects his own brother.
The Sport Parade	1932	Drama	Dartmouth football teammates get involved in professional wrestling.
Huddle	1932	Romance	A poor young Yale player falls in love with an heiress.
Rackety Rax	1932	Comedy	Ex-convicts become players and nightclub dancers become cheerleaders to make a college team popular.
College Coach	1933	Drama	Stars get money and academic favoritism under new coach (Pat O'Brien).
Saturday's Millions	1933	Drama	Western University's top player (Robert Young) sees football strictly as a business.
College Humor	1933	Musical	A professor (Bing Crosby) and a football star fall for the same co-ed.
College Rhythm	1934	Musical	Big man on campus Finnegan (Jack Oakie) gets a store to sponsor a winner-take-all game.
Three Little Pigskins	1934	Comedy	A comical college tale involving The Three Stooges and Lucille Ball.
Gridiron Flash	1934	Drama	Belford College is so desperate that it recruits a new player who has been in prison.
Hold 'Em Yale	1935	Comedy	Colorful crooks and a love-crazy girl distract a Yale football player (Buster Crabbe).
Pigskin Parade	1936	Comedy	A hillbilly (played by Stuart Erwin) becomes a Texas college football hero.
The Big Game	1936	Comedy	A gambler kidnaps Atlantic University's quarterback before the big game vs. Erie.
Fighting Youth	1936	Drama	Campus radicals try to persuade students to protest the football team.
Rose Bowl	1936	Romance	"Cheers" Reynolds must decide which Rose Bowl team's star she likes best.
Over the Goal	1937	Drama	A football star played by (William Hopper) risks permanent injury if he keeps playing.
Saturday's Heroes	1937	Drama	Val Webster (Van Heflin) opposes colleges getting rich while athletes like him stay poor.
That Navy Spirit	1937	Romance	A new quarterback portrayed by Lew Ayres) and his rival play football for the academy.
Navy Blue and Gold	1937	Drama	A midshipman (James Stewart) clears father's name in time to play in Army-Navy game.
Touchdown, Army	1938	Drama	A cocky cadet (Robert Cummings) shapes up in time to play in the Army-Navy game.
Up the River	1938	Comedy	A couple of confidence men become involved in a prison football game.
Hold That Co-ed	1938	Comedy	Football fortunes change for State thanks to a politician (John Barrymore) and a female kicker.
The Gladiator	1938	Comedy	Joe E. Brown joins a college team after an experimental serum gives him super strength.
Mr. Doodle Kicks Off	1938	Comedy	Ellory Bugs offers a large donation to his alma mater, which is to be paid only if his son Jimmie "Doodle" Bugs becomes a football hero. However, "Doodle" is more interested in the band than the football team.
$1,000 a Touchdown	1939	Comedy	Joe E. Brown inherits a college and offers money to any player who can score a touchdown.
The Cowboy Quarterback	1939	Comedy	A professional scout from the "Chicago Packers" discovers a new star in rural Montana.
Knute Rockne, All American	1940	Biographical	The story of Notre Dame head coach Knute Rockne as played by Pat O'Brien with Ronald Reagan as George Gipp.
Too Many Girls	1940	Comedy	Bodyguards hired to watch rich college girl Lucille Ball) join the football team.
The Quarterback	1941	Comedy	A brother pretends to be his twin and becomes his school's football star.
Harmon of MIchigan	1941	Drama	Tom Harmon as himself, a college hero who weds his sweetheart and becomes a coach.
The Spirit of Stanford	1942	Drama	Frankie Albert as himself, a high school quarterback who attends Stanford and excels at football.
The Iron Major	1943	Biographical	The story of coach Frank Cavanaugh (Pat O'Brien), a war hero.
We've Never Been Licked	1943	Drama	A World War II propaganda film about the Corps of Cadets and football at Texas A&M.
Good News	1947	Musical	Tait College can win the big game but only if its star (Peter Lawford) passes an exam.
Triple Threat	1948	Drama	After a Rose Bowl game, two rivals end up playing for the Los Angeles Rams.
Father Was a Fullback	1949	Comedy	The daughter of a coach (Fred MacMurray) has a boyfriend who chooses her over Notre Dame.
Easy Living	1949	Drama	Professional quarterback Pete Wilson (Victor Mature) discovers he has a heart condition.
That's My Boy	1951	Comedy	A Martin and Lewis college football comedy (unrelated to the 1932 film That's My Boy, which is also about college football).
Saturday's Hero	1951	Drama	A Virginia university's halfback played by John Derek deals with injuries and money issues.
Jim Thorpe – All-American	1951	Biographical	The life and football career of Jim Thorpe, portrayed by Burt Lancaster
The Guy Who Came Back	1951	Drama	Injured aging athlete (Paul Douglas) refuses to accept that his playing days are over.
The Rose Bowl Story	1952	Romance	A college gridiron star and a Rose Bowl princess fall in love.
Hold That Line	1952	Comedy	The Bowery Boys discover a miracle "vitamin" and join the school's football team.
Bonzo Goes to College	1952	Comedy	A coach (Edmund Gwenn) is so desperate that he lets a chimpanzee be his new quarterback.
Trouble Along the Way	1953	Comedy	A Catholic college in New York hires a new football coach played by John Wayne.
Crazylegs	1953	Biographical	Based on college the career of Elroy Hirsch, playing himself.
All American	1953	Drama	A quarterback (Tony Curtis) deals with hazing and hardship at a Chicago college.
John Goldfarb, Please Come Home	1965	Comedy	The CIA tries to get Notre Dame's team to lose a game on purpose.
They Call It Pro Football	1967	Documentary	First full-length production from NFL Films.
Paper Lion	1968	Biographical	Adaptation of writer George Plimpton's tryout with Detroit Lions, starring Alan Alda.
Number One	1969	Drama	An aging New Orleans Saints professional quarterback played by (Charlton Heston) falls into drinking and adultery.
Brian's Song	1971	Biographical	A television film on the bond between Brian Piccolo (James Caan) and Gale Sayers (Billy Dee Williams) of the Chicago Bears and Piccolo's cancer battle.
The Longest Yard	1974	Comedy	Burt Reynolds plays a convict who plays on his prison football team.
Two-Minute Warning	1976	Thriller	Fictional story of stadium sniper starring Charlton Heston.
Gus	1976	Comedy	Disney tale of a mule that is able to take a slumping pro football team to the Super Bowl by winning with the ability to kick field-length field goals.
Black Sunday	1977	Thriller	A fictitious story of a terrorist attack on the Super Bowl by use of the Goodyear Blimp.
Something for Joey	1977	Biographical	A television film about John Cappelletti, who won the Heisman Trophy but lost a brother to leukemia.
Semi-Tough	1977	Comedy	Based on Dan Jenkins professional football novel, starring Burt Reynolds.
Heaven Can Wait	1978	Comedy	A remake of Here Comes Mr. Jordan but with football as backdrop instead of boxing. Warren Beatty as owner-quarterback of the Rams.
Superdome	1978	Drama	A television film about Super Bowl quarterbacks (Tom Selleck and Ken Howard) who are distracted by off-the-field worries.
North Dallas Forty	1979	Drama	Based on former Dallas Cowboys wide receiver Peter Gent's novel of the same title, starring Nick Nolte as a character based on Gent.
Coach of the Year	1980	Drama	A former professional player paralyzed in Vietnam agrees to coach at a correctional facility.
Fighting Back: The Rocky Bleier Story	1980	Biographical	About Rocky Bleier and the obstacles he overcame to play for the professional Pittsburgh Steelers after returning wounded from Vietnam.
Grambling's White Tiger	1980	Biographical	Fact-based TV film on Grambling University's first white quarterback, played by Bruce Jenner (Currently identifying as Caitlyn Jenner). (Note: Jenner changed her name due to gender transition in 2015.)
Full Moon High	1981	Comedy/Horror	A teenage football player heads to Romania where his father is bitten by a werewolf.
All the Right Moves	1983	Drama	A high school football player (Tom Cruise)'s contentious relationship with his coach (Craig T. Nelson) may derail his plans to get a college football scholarship.
Quarterback Princess	1983	Biographical	An Oregon schoolgirl seeks a chance to quarterback the boys' team.
The Bear	1984	Biographical	Made for television on the life and coaching career of Alabama's Bear Bryant, played by Gary Busey.
Against All Odds	1984	Drama	A professional receiver played by (Jeff Bridges) develops a fatal attraction to the daughter of team's corrupt owner
Lucas	1986	Comedy	A critically acclaimed American coming-of-age romantic comedy-drama written and directed by David Seltzer and starring Corey Haim, Kerri Green, and Charlie Sheen.
The Best of Times	1986	Comedy	Childhood friends replay their biggest game, starring Robin Williams and Kurt Russell.
Wildcats	1986	Comedy	Goldie Hawn as a high school football coach.
Johnny Be Good	1988	Comedy	A star high school quarterback played byAnthony Michael Hall) must choose among a number of colleges vying to recruit him.
Everybody's All-American	1988	Drama	Dennis Quaid in adaptation of Frank Deford's football novel.
Necessary Roughness	1991	Comedy	The story of a Texas college team filled with misfits.
The Last Boy Scout	1991	Action	An action-comedy film directed by Tony Scott and written by Shane Black, starring Bruce Willis as Joe Hallenbeck, a down-on-his-luck private investigator, and Damon Wayans as former pro quarterback Jimmy Dix. .
A Triumph of the Heart: The Ricky Bell Story	1991	Drama	A film of the relationship of between Tampa Bay Buccaneers running back Ricky Bell and Ryan Blankenship.
School Ties	1992	Drama	A story of high school bigotry with Brendan Fraser and Matt Damon
The Program	1993	Drama	James Caan as a college team's coach.
Rudy	1993	Biographical	True story of quest by Rudy Ruettiger to enroll in and play football at Notre Dame.
Forrest Gump	1994	Comedy-drama	Forrest Gump, among other things, is a champion kick-returner
Little Giants	1994	Comedy	Fiction about men who coach children's teams.
Rise and Walk: The Dennis Byrd Story	1994	Biographical	A television film on the life and career-ending injury of New York Jets' Dennis Byrd.
Jerry Maguire	1996	Romantic comedy	Tom Cruise plays a sports agent who gets fired from his agency and is left with a single client, Arizona Cardinals wide receiver Rod Tidwell, played by Cuba Gooding Jr. who won an Oscar for the performance.
Angels in the Endzone	1997	Comedy	Direct-to-video sequel to the 1994 version of Angels in the Outfield.
The Garbage Picking Field Goal Kicking Philadelphia Phenomenon	1998	Comedy	A television film with Tony Danza.
The Waterboy	1998	Comedy	Adam Sandler as a backward boy who helps a Louisiana school's team.
Air Bud: Golden Receiver	1998	Comedy	In this sequel to Air Bud, the title dog learns to play football.
Varsity Blues	1999	Drama	A Texas high school star quarterback played by James Van Der Beek struggles with pressure from his coach and father.
Any Given Sunday	1999	Drama	A Miami coach (Al Pacino) tries to rein in a quarterback (Jamie Foxx) who is rising in both talent and popularity.
The Fanatics	1999	Comedy	A television film with Ed Asner.
Marshall University: Ashes to Glory	2000	Documentary	A television film history of Marshall University football in the late 20th century, starting with the 1970 plane crash that killed most of the team and ending with the school's successes in the 1990s.
Remember the Titans	2000	Drama	Based on a true story about a Virginia high school coach, starring Denzel Washington.
The Replacements	2000	Comedy	Keanu Reeves stars in a fictional story about replacement players on a professional team during a league strike, loosely based on the 1987 National Football League strike which resulted in teams using replacement players.
Brian's Song	2001	Drama	A remake of the 1971 story of Gale Sayers and Brian Piccolo.
Full Ride	2002	Comedy	A bad-attitude teen is picked to play in a state all-star game.
Monday Night Mayhem	2002	Biographical	The story the creation of Monday Night Football, with John Turturro as sportscaster Howard Cosell.
The Slaughter Rule	2002	Drama	Ryan Gosling as a Montana six-man football player.
The Junction Boys	2002	Biographical	Made for television and based on a true story about a grueling football training camp at Texas A&M under coach Bear Bryant.
Hometown Legend	2002	Drama	A drifting teenager meets a demanding high school coach.
Second String	2002	Comedy	A television film about an ordinary fan who gets to quarterback the Buffalo Bills.
Playmakers	2003	Drama	This ESPN-aired drama depicts the lives of the Cougars, a fictional professional football team in an unidentified city.
Radio	2003	Drama	Based on a true story, with Cuba Gooding Jr. as James "Radio" Kennedy, a mentally challenged young man who aids a football coach.
Friday Night Lights	2004	Drama	Based on a true story about Permian High School's (Odessa, Texas) 1988 football team starring Billy Bob Thornton as Gary Gaines
The Longest Yard	2005	Comedy	A remake of the 1974 film of the same title with Adam Sandler.
Two for the Money	2005	Drama	Al Pacino and Matthew McConaughey gamble on football.
Code Breakers	2005	Drama	An ESPN film on the 1951 West Point cheating scandal, starring Scott Glenn.
Invincible	2006	Biographical	Based on the true story of bartender Vince Papale, played by Mark Wahlberg, who gets offered a contract with the Philadelphia Eagles.
We Are Marshall	2006	Drama	The true story about Marshall's football team following the 1970 plane crash starring Matthew McConaughey as Jack Lengyel.
Facing the Giants	2006	Drama	A Christian-themed story of a high school coach.
Gridiron Gang	2006	Drama/Biographical	Based on a true story starring Dwayne Johnson as a man who creates a football team at Camp Kilpatrick juvenile detention center to compete against local high schools.
The Comebacks	2007	Comedy	Spoof of sports movies, featuring football coach "Lambeau Fields."
The Game Plan	2007	Comedy	Professional quarterback (Dwayne Johnson) discovers that he has a daughter.
Leatherheads	2007	Comedy	George Clooney in fictional story about 1920s professional football.
Perfect Effort	2007	Documentary	The true story of De La Salle High School's football team and the longest winning streak in the history of American sports
Harvard Beats Yale 29-29	2008	Documentary	Alumni (including Tommy Lee Jones) recall a memorable 1968 Ivy League game.
The Express: The Ernie Davis Story	2008	Biographical	The factual account of the life of Heisman Trophy winner Ernie Davis.
The Longshots	2008	Comedy	Based on a true story of the first girl to play in Pop Warner league.
The Band that Wouldn't Die	2009	Documentary	Made for televkision as a part of ESPN's 30 for 30 series, this film xplores the history of the Baltimore Colts, the team's controversial move to Indianapolis, and the NFL's return to Baltimore through the common thread of the Colts marching band.
The Blind Side	2009	Biographical	The true story about the high school career and recruitment of Michael Oher. Sandra Bullock and Tim McGraw played Oher's adoptive parents Sean and Leigh Anne Tuohy. Bullock won an Oscar for her role.
The Legend of Jimmy the Greek	2009	Documentary	Made for television as a part of ESPN's 30 for 30 series. A look at Jimmy "the Greek" Snyder, from his start as a bookie through his firing from The NFL Today.
Small Potatoes: Who Killed the USFL?	2009	Documentary	Made for TV as a part of ESPN's 30 for 30 series. Follows rise and demise of 1980s United States Football League, including team owner Donald Trump.
The U	2009	Documentary	Made for TV as a part of ESPN's 30 for 30 series. Chronicles dominance of University of Miami program in the 1980s and 1990s.
The Best That Never Was	2010	Documentary	Made for TV as a part of ESPN's 30 for 30 series. Examines 1981 Mississippi high school star Marcus Dupree, his injury-prone career, and how he affected recruiting process.
Run Ricky Run	2010	Documentary	Made for TV as a part of ESPN's 30 for 30 series the film shows thelife of Ricky Williams, focusing on his 2004 departure from the NFL.
Straight Outta L.A.	2010	Documentary	Made for TV as a part of ESPN's 30 for 30 series, the film depicts the relationship between the Raiders and its minority fan base during its 1982–1994 stint in L.A.
4th & Goal	2010	Documentary	Six players are followed over six years as they try to make it to NFL, this is a unique look at journey from high school to professional football.
The 5th Quarter	2011	Drama	Based on story of Jon Abbate and the surprising 2006 season of Wake Forest University.
Herschel	2011	Documentary	Made for TV as a part of ESPN's 30 for 30 series about Herschel Walker
The Marinovich Project	2011	Documentary	Made for TV as a follow-up to ESPN's 30 for 30 series, the film details the rise and fall of USC and NFL quarterback Todd Marinovich, focusing on complex relationship with his father.
Pony Excess	2011	Documentary	Made for TV as a part of ESPN's 30 for 30 series, this is a history of football at Southern Methodist University, including 1987 scandal that shut down the program for two years.
Roll Tide/War Eagle	2011	Documentary	Made for TV as a follow-up to ESPN's 30 for 30 series. On the intense rivalry between Alabama and Auburn and how a devastating tornado and an act of vandalism placed the rivalry in perspective.
Undefeated	2011	Documentary	The film chronicles the 2009 season of Manassas High School, a doormat of Memphis football seeking its first playoff win. It won the Oscar for Best Documentary Feature.
Touchback	2012	Drama	Ohio farmer relives a high school football game that changed his life.
Ghosts of Ole Miss	2012	Documentary	Made for TV as a part of ESPN's 30 for 30 series. A 50-year retrospective on 1962 at the University of Mississippi, marked by an undefeated football season against the backdrop of violence over the school's integration.
Season of a Lifetime	2012	Documentary	The story of football coach Jeremy Williams, who though terminally ill with ALS refuses to retire, deciding instead to coach for one last season.
You Don't Know Bo	2012	Documentary	Made for TV as a part of ESPN's 30 for 30 series about baseball and football star Bo Jackson.
23 Blast	2013	Drama	The true story about Travis Freeman, a Kentucky teen who loses his sight.
Against the Tide	2013	Documentary	This made for TV film looks back at the 1970 USC–Alabama game in which an integrated USC team easily defeated all-white Alabama and hastened the integration of the sport in the South.
The Book of Manning	2013	Documentary	Made for TV as a part of ESPN's 30 for 30 series, the film examines football's Manning family, father Archie and his sons Peyton and Eli
Elway to Marino	2013	Documentary	Made for TV as a part of ESPN's 30 for 30 series, the film looks at the six quarterbacks selected in the first round of 1983 NFL draft, focusing on John Elway, the first picked, and Dan Marino, the last.
Youngstown Boys	2013	Documentary	Made for TV as a part of ESPN's 30 for 30 series, the film examines the relationship at Ohio State between coach Jim Tressel and player Maurice Clarett.
League of Denial	2013	Documentary	An investigation about concussions and the health crisis threatening NFL players and the long-term fortunes of football.
Brian and The Boz	2014	Documentary	Made for TV as a part of ESPN's 30 for 30 series, the film explores the rise, fall, and post-football life of Brian Bosworth.
Draft Day	2014	Drama	A sports drama film using real NFL teams but fictional people, starring Kevin Costner as the general manager of the Cleveland Browns working with his coaching staff to determine whom they should draft.
Keepers of the Streak	2014	Documentary	The film focuses on four photographers who worked at every Super Bowl from the first game in 1967 through the 2014 game.
Rand University	2014	Documentary	Made for TV as a part of ESPN's 30 for 30 series, the film examines former NFL star Randy Moss and his origins in Rand, West Virginia.
The U Part 2	2014	Documentary	Made for TV as a part of ESPN's 30 for 30 series and a sequel to The U following Miami football's rise from scandal to renewed dominance, only to face new controversy with the Nevin Shapiro scandal.
We Could Be King	2014	Documentary	A high school team faces with a merger with its rival.
When the Game Stands Tall	2014	Drama	True story of De La Salle High School's 151-game record-setting winning streak.
Happy Valley	2014	Documentary	About the sex abuse scandal involving Jerry Sandusky and its impact on Pennsylvania State University and its football program.
Balls Out	2014	Comedy	A sports-movie spoof about students who form an intramural team.
'51 Dons	2014	Documentary	In 1951, the undefeated San Francisco Dons decline an invitation to play in the Orange Bowl after being told they must play without two African-American stars.
Concussion	2015	Biographical	True story about forensic pathologist Bennet Omalu, played by Will Smith, who discovered the brain disease chronic traumatic encephalopathy (CTE) after performing an autopsy on former NFL center Mike Webster, portrayed by David Morse.
Carter High	2015	Drama	Robberies and a grades scandal cost a Dallas school its 1988 state championship.
Four Falls of Buffalo	2015	Documentary	Made for TV as a part of ESPN's 30 for 30 series. The story of the Buffalo Bills of the early 1990s, the only team ever to reach four consecutive Super Bowls but loser of all four.
The Gospel According to Mac	2015	Documentary	Made for TV as a part of ESPN's 30 for 30 series. Explores the tenure of Bill McCartney as Colorado Buffaloes coach, which combined great success (including a national title) and controversy in some quarters over his overt evangelicalism.
My All American	2015	Biographical	Dramatization of Texas Longhorns player Freddie Steinmark's fight with cancer.
Trojan War	2015	Documentary	Made for TV as a part of ESPN's 30 for 30 series. Examines the return to prominence of the USC Trojans under Pete Carroll and the pay-for-play scandal that tarnished Carroll's success.
Woodlawn	2015	Drama	Racial tensions and Christian revival affect Alabama athletes and coach (Jon Voight) in 1973.
The '85 Bears	2016	Documentary	Made for TV as a part of ESPN's 30 for 30 series. A 30-year retrospective on the 1985 Chicago Bears, one of the most dominant and colorful teams in NFL history.
Catholics vs. Convicts	2016	Documentary	Made for TV as a part of ESPN's 30 for 30 series, the film examines the cultural impact of the 1988 Notre Dame–Miami game.
Greater	2016	Biographical	The story of Brandon Burlsworth, possibly the greatest walk-on in the history of college football.
Gleason	2016	Documentary	NFL defensive back Steve Gleason bravely copes with ALS (Lou Gehrig's disease).
O.J.: Made in America	2016	Documentary	Multi-part documentary series (three in theaters, five on TV) for ESPN Films and the 30 for 30 series focusing on the life, football career, acting career, and criminal cases of O. J. Simpson. Oscar for Best Documentary Feature.
This Was the XFL	2017	Documentary	Made for TV as a part of ESPN's 30 for 30 series. The story of the short-lived XFL and the friendship between its co-founders Vince McMahon and Dick Ebersol.
What Carter Lost	2017	Documentary	Made for TV as a part of ESPN's 30 for 30 series. Looks at the team that ended the 1988 Permian High playoff run immortalized in Friday Night Lights, Carter High from Dallas—with more than 20 players receiving major-college scholarship offers, but soon afterward seeing six players involved in an armed robbery.
Year of the Scab	2017	Documentary	Made for TV as a part of ESPN's 30 for 30 series. A 30-year retrospective on the replacement players who led the 1987 Washington Redskins to a 3–0 start during that year's players' strike, paving the way for the team's Super Bowl victory that season—but at the time still stigmatized as "scabs" by fans and especially by the Redskins' front office.
The Two Bills	2018	Documentary	Made for TV as a part of ESPN's 30 for 30 series. Explores the relationship between NFL coaching legends Bill Parcells and Bill Belichick.
Paterno	2018	Biographical	HBO film focusing on Joe Paterno and the aftermath of the Jerry Sandusky sexual abuse scandal.
Seau	2018	Documentary	Made as part of ESPN's 30 for 30 series and initially released on the company's ESPN+ streaming service. Examines the life of NFL legend Junior Seau, from his Samoan immigrant origins to NFL superstardom, mental decline, and eventual suicide linked to CTE.
Vick	2020	Documentary	Made as part of ESPN's 30 for 30 series. Two-part look at the rise, fall, and controversial NFL return of Michael Vick.
Safety	2020	Biographical	American biographical sports drama family film based on the story of Ray McElrathbey, a football player who battled family adversity to join the Clemson Tigers.
Al Davis vs. the NFL	2021	Documentary	Made as part of ESPN's 30 for 30 series. The story of the rivalry between Al Davis, owner of the team now known as the Las Vegas Raiders, and NFL commissioner Pete Rozelle, as told partially by deepfake versions of the long-deceased pair.
American Underdog	2021	Drama	The story of NFL MVP and Hall of Fame quarterback Kurt Warner, who went from stocking shelves at a supermarket to becoming an American Football star.
Bowl Game Armageddon	2023	Drama	The story of civil rights icon Bobby Grier. He was the first African American football player to break the color barrier of the US collegiate Bowl games, in the deep south.
BS High	2023	Documentary	HBO production examining the Bishop Sycamore High School scandal.
Bullies of Baltimore	2023	Documentary	A co-production of ESPN and NFL Films, included in ESPN's 30 for 30 series. Examines how a dominant defense and larger-than-life personalities propelled the 2000 Baltimore Ravens to a Super Bowl win. The film uses a May 2022 reunion of the team's key figures as a framing device.
80 for Brady	2023	Comedy	Four friends travel to the Super Bowl to see Tom Brady play.
Johnny Football	2023	Documentary	Follows pro quarterback Johnny Manziel’s controversial career.
The Great Heisman Race of 1997	2023	Documentary	Part of ESPN's 30 for 30 series. How the 1997 college season began with Peyton Manning as a solid Heisman Trophy favorite, but ended with multiple contenders (including eventual winner Charles Woodson).
The Minister of Defense	2023	Documentary	Part of ESPN's 30 for 30 series, recapping Reggie White's complex life as a Hall of Fame defensive end and ordained evangelical minister. Features previously unseen footage from an interview White recorded before his 2004 death.
The Murder of Air McNair	2024	Documentary	Chronicles the life, career, and shocking death of Steve McNair. Part of Netflix's Untold sports documentary series.
The New York Sack Exchange	2024	Documentary	Part of ESPN's 30 for 30 series, looking back at the defensive line of the 1980s New York Jets.
The Philly Special	2026	Documentary	Part of ESPN's 30 for 30 series, looking back at the play that turned Super Bowl LII in the Philadelphia Eagles' favor.

== List of highest grossing American football films ==
The following is a list of highest grossing American football films.

2006 is the most frequent year with 4 entries on the list whiles 98% of the films were released after 1960. 6 films are along the highest-grossing sports films of all time.

Highest-grossing films
Rank	Title	Worldwide gross	Year	Ref
1	Forrest Gump	$678,226,465	1994	
2	The Blind Side	$309,231,694	2009	
3	Jerry Maguire	$273,552,592	1996	
4	The Longest Yard	$191,466,556	2005	
5	The Waterboy	$185,991,646	1998	
6	The Game Plan	$147,880,543	2007	
7	Remember the Titans	$136,771,683	2000	
8	Any Given Sunday	$100,230,832	1999	
9	Heaven Can Wait	$81,640,278	1978	
10	Friday Night Lights	$61,950,770	2004	
11	The Last Boy Scout	$59,509,925	1991	
12	Invincible	$58,480,828	2006	
13	Varsity Blues	$54,294,169	1999	
14	Radio	$53,293,628	2003	
15	The Replacements	$50,054,511	2000	
16	Concussion	$48,623,572	2015	
17	We Are Marshall	$43,545,364	2006	
18	The Longest Yard	$43,008,075	1974	
19	Gridiron Gang	$41,480,851	2006	
20	Leatherheads	$41,319,039	2008	
21	80 for Brady	$40,480,875	2023	
22	Semi-Tough	$37,187,139	1977	
23	Two for the Money	$30,526,509	2005	
24	When the Game Stands Tall	$30,138,754	2014	
25	Draft Day	$29,824,199	2014	
26	American Underdog	$26,514,814	2021	
27	Wildcats	$26,285,544	1986	
28	Necessary Roughness	$26,255,594	1991	
29	North Dallas Forty	$26,079,312	1979	
30	The Program	$23,032,565	1993	
31	Rudy	$22,881,563	1993	
32	Gus	$21,873,000	1976	
33	Against All Odds	$21,689,062	1984	
34	Little Giants	$19,306,362	1994	
35	Johnny Be Good	$17,550,399	1988	
36	All the Right Moves	$17,233,166	1983	
37	Black Sunday	$15,769,322	1977	
38	School Ties	$14,715,067	1992	
39	Woodlawn	$14,401,617	2015	
40	The Comebacks	$13,539,154	2007	
41	When I Fall in Love	$12,638,294	1988	
42	The Longshots	$11,767,866	2008	
43	Air Bud: Golden Receiver	$10,224,116	1998	
44	Facing the Giants	$10,243,159	2006	
45	The Express: The Ernie Davis Story	$9,808,124	2008	
46	Lucas	$8,200,000	1986	
47	The Best of Times	$7,817,314	1986	
48	Two-Minute Warning	$6,700,000	1976	
49	That's My Boy	$3,800,000	1951	
50	John Goldfarb, Please Come Home!	$3,000,000	1965	

== See also ==
- List of sports films
- List of highest grossing sports films
