= IMG Academy =

Private athletic school in Bradenton, Florida, US

Location
- 5650 Bollettieri Blvd; Bradenton, Manatee, Florida 34210; 27.441°N 82.602°W

Information
- Former name: Nick Bollettieri Tennis Academy
- Type: Private, college preparatory school
- Established: 1978; 48 years ago
- Founder: Nick Bollettieri
- Grades: 6–12 & postgraduate
- Gender: Co-educational
- Campus size: 600 acres (243 ha)
- Campus type: Suburban
- Colors: Blue; White; Black
- Nickname: Ascenders
- Accreditation: NAIS
- Affiliation: Independent (1978–87); IMG (1987–2013); Endeavor (2013–23); BPEA EQT (2023–present)
- Website: www.imgacademy.com

IMG Academy is a preparatory boarding school and sports training facility in Bradenton, Florida, United States. The organization is set across over 600 acres (243 ha) and features programs consisting of sport camps for young athletes, adult camps, a boarding school, including a post-graduate/gap-year program, events, professional and collegiate training, group hosting, and corporate retreats.

In April 2023, Endeavor announced the sale of IMG Academy to BPEA EQT for $1.26 billion. On June 28, 2023, the deal was completed.

== History ==
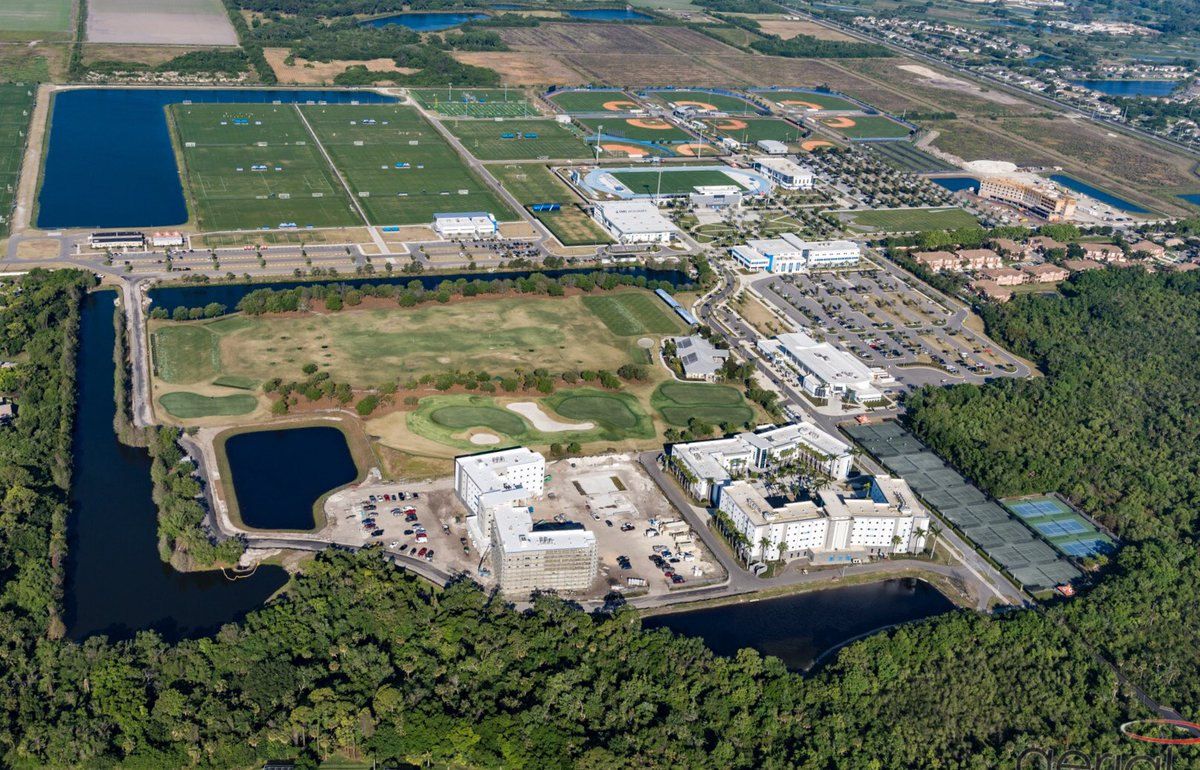
Aerial photographs of the Bradenton campus.

Nick Bollettieri founded the Nick Bollettieri Tennis Academy in 1978. Sports company IMG purchased the academy in 1987. IMG acquired the youth division of the David Leadbetter Golf Academy in 1993 and added programs for soccer and baseball in 1994. Hockey and basketball programs were added in 2000 and 2001, respectively, and by 2002 the IMG campus had expanded to 190 acres (0.77 km^{2}). IMG Academy suspended its hockey program in 2003. Football was added in 2010, as well as lacrosse. Track & field and cross country were added in 2013.

IMG Academy currently sits on 450 acres (180 ha) of land, and in 2011, IMG paid $7.5 million for an additional 110 acres (45 ha) adjacent to the current campus for future expansion. In 2014, IMG purchased an additional 24 acres (9.7 ha). The land borders IMG's west campus, where the sports performance academy is undergoing a $198 million expansion.

The IMG Pendleton School was founded in 1999 as a co-educational, college preparatory school for athletic students. In 2012, the school changed its name to "IMG Academy". It delivers both academics and athletics.

In 2021, the school's football team faced off against Bishop Sycamore in which they won in a 58–0 rout. Bishop Sycamore received scrutiny after the game and its existence was questioned.

On April 25, 2023, parent company Endeavor agreed to sell IMG Academy to private equity firm BPEA EQT at a value of $1.25 billion – the sale was completed in June 2023.

The Office of Foreign Assets Control (OFAC) announced on February 12, 2026 that IMG Academy had agreed to pay $1.72 million in fines in order to settle 89 apparent violations of counter-narcotics sanctions. The OFAC said that IMG Academy had accepted tuition fees from two students, who were enrolled from 2018 to 2022, whose parents, Wendy Dalaithy Amaral Arévalo and Gerardo González Valencia, were sanctioned for providing financial support or services to Los Cuinis, a group within the Jalisco New Generation Cartel (CJNG), a Mexican drug trafficking organization.

The Treasury Department noted that the school cooperated in the investigation and reported the violations when it became aware of them, but that a federal investigation had already begun into the school and that the school had "demonstrated reckless disregard" by failing to conduct sanctions screenings before accepting payments. IMG Academy said in a statement that it has since enacted "a comprehensive sanctions compliance program" since the violations took place.

== Programs ==
=== Boys' and girls' tennis programs ===
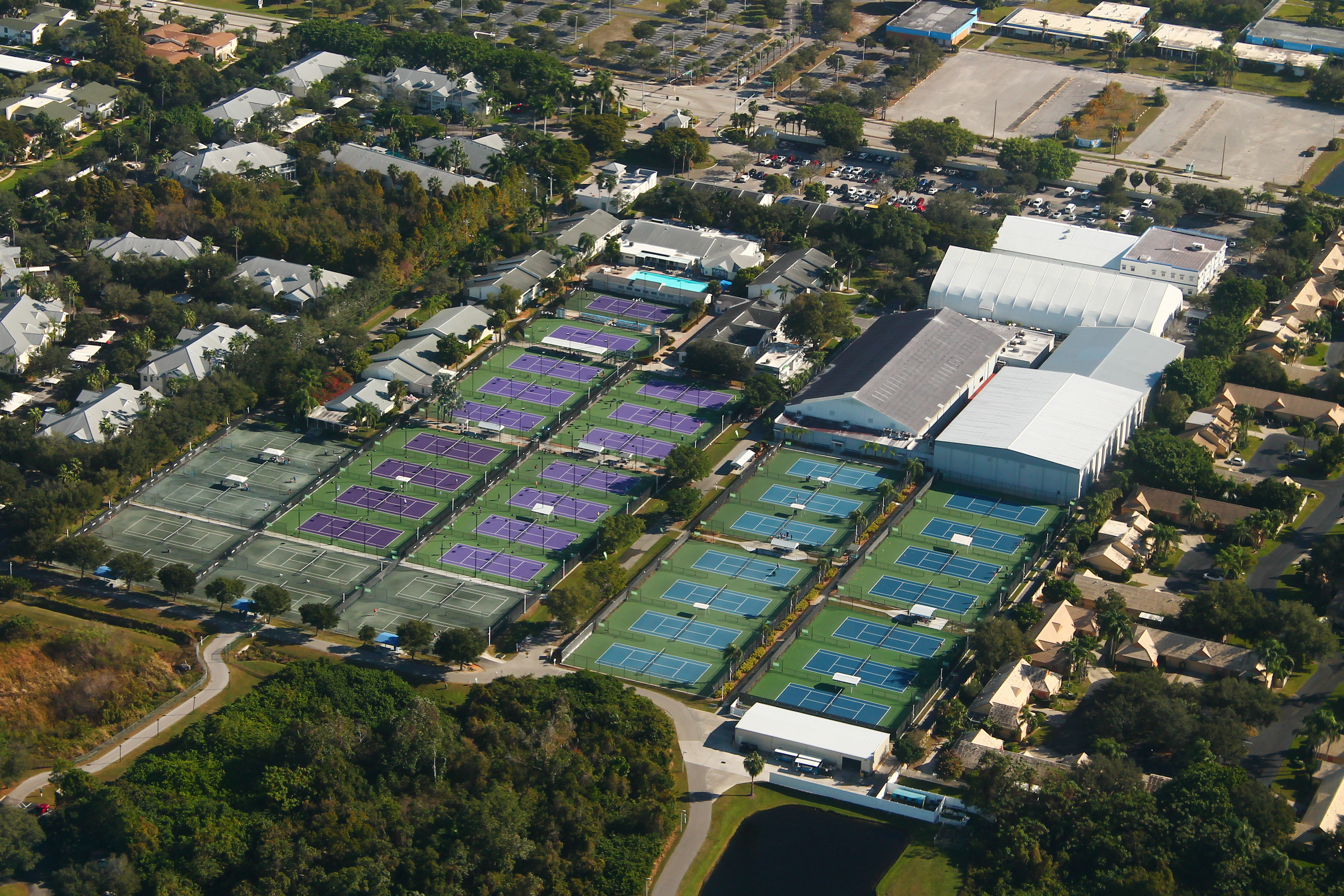
Some of the tennis courts at the academy

IMG Academy tennis programs offer year-round tennis camps ranging from one to five weeks in length and were led by director Rohan Goetzke in 2019. The campus has 35 outdoor hard courts, 5 indoor hard courts, and 16 green clay courts.

In 1987, thirty-two academy students or former students were in the Wimbledon draw and twenty-seven were in the U.S. Open. Famous past students include Andre Agassi, Monica Seles, Jim Courier, Kei Nishikori, Alejandro Tabilo, Anna Kournikova, Serena Williams, Maria Sharapova, and Michael Mmoh.

=== Football program ===
IMG announced the John Madden Football Academy in March 2010 and held its first camp from June 4–6, 2010. The football program offers a residency program and year-round camps ranging from three days to five weeks in length and was previously led by former NFL quarterback Chris Weinke. The academy fielded a high school football team for the first time in 2013. In 2013, MaxPreps called IMG Academy the "nation's top high school football facility." Kevin Wright was named head coach in 2015 after Weinke accepted a position as quarterbacks coach with the then-St. Louis Rams. Wright guided the program to its first undefeated regular season (9–0) in 2015.

=== Boys' and girls' soccer programs ===
IMG Academy offered an academy soccer program and year-round soccer camps from 1999 to 2017. IMG Academy was home to U.S. Soccer's full-time residency program for the United States' U-16 and U-17 men's national teams. It was integral in developing the United States' top youth soccer prospects. The Bradenton Academy grew from an initial twenty players to thirty in 2002 and then to forty in 2003. The program was split into a U-16 squad and a U-17 squad. The girls program was a member of the Girls Academy League.

The academy traced its roots back to Project 2010 which highlighted ways U.S. Soccer could make the senior men's national team a legitimate threat to win the World Cup by the end of the decade. Two programs that were born from Project 2010 were Generation Adidas (previously called Project-40) and the Bradenton Academy. The academy was started in January 1999 with the backing of IMG and Nike, but was closed in 2017 due to the proliferation of U.S. Development Academy programs.

=== Baseball program ===
IMG Academy has an academy baseball program and year-round camps, in addition to summer Wood Bat Leagues.

=== Boys' and girls' basketball programs ===
IMG Academy's postgraduate program played in their only appearance in the 2016 National Prep Championship in New Haven, Connecticut. Among the teams were Brewster Academy, DME Academy, Elev-8 Sports Institute, Fork Union Military Academy, Hargrave Military Academy, IMG Academy, Northfield Mount Hermon School, and more. The head coach of IMG's national high school team is Sean McAloon, who previously was the head coach at St. John's College High School in Washington, D.C.

Its basketball alumni include Dallas Mavericks forward Dwight Powell and Orlando Magic forward Jonathan Isaac, the 6th overall pick of the 2017 NBA draft. In 2017, IMG Academy had its first two selections to the McDonald's All American Game: Trevon Duval was selected to the boys game and Rellah Boothe was selected to the girls game. In 2018, Anfernee Simons entered directly from the academy to the 2018 NBA draft, becoming the second player in the academy's history to do so and the first American to enter and be selected in an NBA draft directly after graduating from high school since the league first implemented age restriction rules in 2005

During the preparation for the 2017 NBA draft, the IMG Academy hosted their first ever draft combine. The Professional Basketball Combine was held as an alternative (mainly for seniors) to measure their abilities and potentially give them the chance to enter the NBA, if not allow them the chance to play in the NBA G League or even overseas, with nearly every participant that year doing exactly that. Currently, four players that participated in the event signed two-way contracts to enter the NBA properly, with eight of them going overseas and 11 players entered the G League. The event would be held once again in 2018, gaining more popularity that year with the participation of former UCLA player and current professional player LiAngelo Ball.

Due to the COVID-19 pandemic, the entire WNBA 2020 season was held there. Under a plan approved on June 15, 2020, the shortened 22-game regular season was held without fans present.

=== Boys' and girls' lacrosse programs ===
IMG Academy has an academy lacrosse program and year-round camps. IMG Academy launched a high school team in 2012, featuring a new women's program made in 2018. Notable alumni include Tehoka Nanticoke. Prior to that, IMG Academy hosted their first full-time lacrosse student-athlete, Matthew Xirinachs, starting in September 2010. Xirinachs went on to join the Drexel men's lacrosse team in fall 2011. The women's team hired head coach Jeff McGuigan in July 2019.

=== Boys' and girls' track and field and cross country programs ===
IMG Academy has an academy track and field and cross country program and year-round camps.

=== Boys' and girls' golf programs ===
IMG Academy offers academy level golf for boys' and girls' starting in grade six.

=== Boys' and girls' volleyball programs ===
In 2022, IMG Academy hired two-time Olympian Donald Suxho as Director of Volleyball to launch its entry into girls' indoor volleyball beginning in fall of 2023. The inaugural class of 29 girls included two teams that will compete in the 18U and 16U club circuit.

After successfully adding girls' volleyball in 2023, IMG Academy will introduce boys' volleyball with summer camps in 2025 followed by a full academy program in 2026.

=== Softball program ===
IMG Academy is set to launch softball in 2025, to further enhance opportunities for female athletes.

=== Boys' and girls' swimming programs ===
IMG Academy has announced the addition of its third new sport in 2025. They will construct a new state of art pool and the program will officially begin in 2027.

=== Boys' wrestling program ===
IMG Academy has announced the start of its wrestling program. It will begin with spring and summer camps in 2026 and with the boarding school program in the fall of 2026.

== Demographics ==
IMG Academy - Racial and ethnic composition (NH = Non-Hispanic)
Race	Pop 2022	% 2022
White (NH)	561	43.2
Black or African American (NH)	104	8.0
Native American or Alaska Native (NH)	12	0.9
Asian (NH)	393	30.3
Pacific Islander (NH)	2	0.2
Some Other Race (NH)	0	—
Mixed/Multi-Racial (NH)	2	—
Hispanic or Latino	227	17.5
Total	1299	100.1

== Notable alumni ==
Since opening in 1978, IMG Academy has trained hundreds of Olympic and professional athletes, including those in the NFL, MLB, NBA, WNBA, MLS, NWSL, NLL, ATP, WTA, PGA Tour and LPGA Tour.
