= Sadaf Rahimi =

Afghan boxer

- Occupation: Boxer

Sadaf Rahimi is an Afghan boxer. She was the first Afghan female boxer to be invited to the 2012 London Olympics, and the first female boxer on Afghanistan's national boxing team.

== Biography ==
Rahimi and her siblings spent much of their childhood in Iran; their parents fled Afghanistan to Iran following the rise of the Taliban in 1990s. While living in Iran, she started boxing at age 14 after she watched Laila Ali box in a competition. After returning to Afghanistan with her family in 2007, Rahimi was coached by Saber Sharifi, a former male professional boxer, who as of 2012 trained 30 Afghan girls and young women in Kabul's Ghazi stadium. In order to train, Rahimi had to gain permission from her family; however, Rahimi's family was very supportive of her decision to box. Rahimi trained three days a week for an hour in the Ghazi stadium and also practiced in her home. She was careful to conceal her identity as a boxer while traveling to and from practice, as passersby would threaten her if they discovered she was a boxer.

At the age of 17, Rahimi was given a wildcard to compete in the London 2012 Olympics. Unfortunately, due to her safety in the ring the International Boxing Association (AIBA) decided that Rahimi should not compete.

In 2013, Rahimi was invited to attend a competition in the UK by the Women in Sport association; she did not attend, after paperwork allowing her to travel to the UK did not come through. Rahimi continued to receive threats, and rumors were started that she was having sexual relationships with trainers. Rahimi failed to qualify for the 2016 Rio Olympics.

In July 2016, Rahimi and one of her older sisters, Shabnam, also a boxer, fled Afghanistan, citing the Taliban's actions against women. The two traveled to Spain under the pretenses of attending the premier of The Boxing Girls of Kabul. They stayed with the film's directors in Spain for two months while claiming asylum. In 2018, they received residency permits in Spain.

As of 2019, Rahimi was worked as a cleaner at Madrid City Hall.

== Media appearances ==
Rahimi's and other Afghan female boxers’ story was told in a documentary film, The Boxing Girls of Kabul, which was directed by Ariel Nasr and produced by Annette Clarke for the National Film Board of Canada.
