= BS High =

- Official poster
- Directed by: Martin Desmond Roe; Travon Free
- Produced by: Spencer Paysinger; Jack Turner
- Cinematography: David Markun
- Edited by: Lauren Brown; Derek Doneen; Dean Gonazlez; Sean Horvath; Cynthia Zhong
- Music by: Tk Kayembe
- Production companies: HBO Sports; Hyperobject Industries; SMAC Entertainment; Matador Content; The Athletic
- Distributed by: HBO
- Release dates: June 14, 2023 (Tribeca); August 23, 2023 (United States)
- Running time: 100 minutes
- Country: United States
- Language: English

BS High is a 2023 American documentary film directed by Martin Desmond Roe and Travon Free. It follows the Bishop Sycamore High School scandal. Spencer Paysinger serves as a producer, while Adam McKay and Michael Strahan serve as executive producers.

It had its world premiere at Tribeca Festival on June 14, 2023, and was released on August 23, 2023, by HBO.

== Plot ==
The film follows the Bishop Sycamore High School scandal. Roy Johnson, the former head coach, former colleagues John Branham and Andre Peterson, journalists, Andrew King and Bomani Jones, school sports investigator Ben Ferree, alongside the former Bishop Sycamore players appear in the film.

== Production ==
Production on the film commenced weeks after the Bishop Sycamore team ended up on ESPN. Martin Desmond Roe and Travon Free spent three days interviewing Roy Johnson, who went unpaid for his appearance in the film. Fact-checkers and multiple people were used to verify claims and stories made by Johnson. Some stories told by Johnson, including his admiration for Donald Trump, went on the cutting room floor.

In August 2022, it was announced Martin Desmond Roe and Travon Free would direct the film, with Adam McKay and Michael Strahan executive producing, and HBO producing and distributing.

== Release ==
The film had its world premiere at Tribeca Festival on June 14, 2023. It was released on August 23, 2023, by HBO.

== Reception ==
On Metacritic, the film has a weighted average score of 65 out of 100, based on 5 critics, indicating "generally favorable reviews".

== See also ==
- List of American football films
