= The Gentlemen's Rant =

- Genre: Comedy
- Created by: John Elerick
- Starring: John Elerick, Travon Free, Roger Roth, Will Stephens
- Country of origin: United States
- Original language: English

Production
- Running time: 2-5 minutes

Original release
- Network: YouTube
- Release: September 2, 2011 – September 27, 2016

The Gentlemen's Rant is an online series created by John Elerick. The show began on September 2, 2011. The show features four hosts ranting about a certain topic. Topics that have been featured on the show include hipsters Starbucks, and a pro-gun control stance, among other topics.

Episodes of The Gentlemen's Rant have been featured on BuzzFeed and The Huffington Post.

Two other shows, The Gentlemen's Response and The Gentlemen's Rebuttal were created by Elerick. Response, an online series where the hosts reply to comments left on past episodes, premiered on January 12, 2012. Rebuttal, an online series, with the premise of Rant that uses the video submissions of the audience instead of the four main hosts, premiered on May 17, 2012.

Elerick was featured in a Water.org video, alongside Matt Damon.
