= The Boxing Girls of Kabul =

Canadian documentary film directed by Ariel Nasr

The Boxing Girls of Kabul is a 2012 Canadian documentary film directed by Ariel Nasr. The film follows young women boxers, under which Sadaf Rahimi, and their coach Sabir Sharifi at Afghanistan’s female boxing academy, as these athletes face harassment and threats in their efforts to represent their country in international competition and attempt to qualify for the 2012 Olympic Games.

Training takes place at Ghazi Stadium, Afghanistan’s national stadium, which had previously been the site of executions by the Taliban.

The 52-minute documentary was produced by Annette Clarke for the National Film Board of Canada. Julia Kent composed music for the film.

== Festivals and awards ==
The Boxing Girls of Kabul premiered at International Documentary Film Festival Amsterdam (IDFA) in 2011 and Hot Docs International Film Festival (Toronto) in 2012, where it won the Inspirit Foundation Pluralism Prize. In March 2013, the film won best short documentary at the 1st Canadian Screen Awards. Other awards include Best Documentary at the Viewfinders International Film Festival for Youth in Halifax (April 17 to 21 2012), and an Honourable Mention for the Colin Low Award at the DOXA Documentary Film Festival in Vancouver (May 4 to 13 2012).

== Distribution ==
U.S. distribution rights were acquired by In Demand. Other broadcasters include TV5 Québec Canada, Direct TV and DLA for Latin America, France Televisions, DBS in Israel, the Korean Broadcasting System and Japan's NHK.

== See also ==
- Buzkashi Boys, a 2012 short drama produced by Nasr, nominated for the Academy Award for Best Live Action Short Film.
