= Elway to Marino =

- Directed by: Ken Rodgers
- Starring: Marvin Demoff, John Elway, Dan Marino, Jim Kelly, Ernie Accorsi, Chris Berman
- Narrated by: Tom Selleck
- Country of origin: United States
- Original language: English

Production
- Running time: 80 minutes
- Production company: NFL Films

Original release
- Network: ESPN
- Release: April 23, 2013

Elway to Marino is a 2013 ESPN 30 for 30 documentary about the first round of the 1983 NFL draft. The film was released on April 23, 2013, directed by Ken Rodgers, and produced by NFL Films.

== Synopsis ==
The film explores the 1983 NFL draft through the eyes of Marvin Demoff, the then agent for Dan Marino and John Elway via the notes that he wrote in real time starting in the months leading up to the draft. The film covers the battle between Demoff, Elway and the Elway family and the Baltimore Colts who had the 1st overall pick that year until the ultimate trading of him to the Denver Broncos, the fall of Dan Marino through the draft and the other teams and their various picks and what happened to them.

The film features Demoff, Elway, Marino, Jim Kelly, Chris Berman and then Colts general manager Ernie Accorsi, as well as interviews with other NFL personnel involved in the draft, as well as some of the other first round draft picks of 1983.

The film's main focus was on John Elway's desire to not play for the Colts, citing their dysfunctional status and the sheer dislike of despised then-owner Robert Irsay, and the attempts by the Colts to trade their #1 draft pick to other teams. Accorsi's plan was to trade the draft rights to Elway for a top-10 draft pick, which he was then going to use to draft Dan Marino. Among the trades that were explored were the following:

- A draft-day trade with the New England Patriots involving John Hannah. This deal was attempted by Irsay, without Accorsi's consult. However, Accorsi flatly refused to make any trades to any teams within the Colts' division. According to Accorsi, he told Irsay, "If you make this trade, which you have every right to do, there'll be two press conferences: you announcing the trade, and me announcing my resignation."
- A three-way trade with the Los Angeles Raiders and the Chicago Bears, where the trade would involve the Bears' pick at #6 going to the Colts. According to Demoff, a trade was verbally agreed to, but after Bears general manager Jim Finks got a call from Don Weiss of the NFL, the trade was suddenly called off. When Finks later spoke about it, he told the NFL that the trade fell through because when the Bears asked for Howie Long in the trade, the Raiders backed out, though Al Davis denied this, and gave his own belief that NFL commissioner Pete Rozelle intervened and ordered the Bears to not make the trade. While the NFL dismissed this as being part of Davis' own paranoia, Demoff would later say that "I don't think (Davis) was paranoid in this case...He was most likely accurate."
- A trade with the San Francisco 49ers for Joe Montana and the 49ers' first round pick (#5) in exchange for the pick for Elway was also explored. Accorsi said that he had conversations with Bill Walsh about possibly trading for Montana, due to a down season by Montana and the 49ers, but Walsh ultimately told Accorsi, "I just could never trade him," and Accorsi himself later said, "I think Bill knew he wasn't done winning championships with Montana."
  - The 49ers' #5 pick was then traded to the San Diego Chargers, who now had three first-round draft picks, which led NFL experts to believe the Chargers would pursue John Elway, due to the Chargers having contract disputes with Dan Fouts. The Chargers offered their other first round draft picks, a 2nd round pick in 1984, and backup quarterback Ed Luther to the Colts for Elway, but when the Chargers refused to include the #5 pick to the Colts, negotiations fell through. As Accorsi later said, "We didn't get to 1st base, much less second base, (with the Chargers)." By draft day, the Chargers announced that Fouts had agreed to a new contract with San Diego. According to Demoff, he believed "the Chargers, for lack of a better word, used John Elway to sign Dan Fouts...the announcement of Fouts' contract was more of a confirmation than a revelation."
- The Seattle Seahawks, owners of the #3 draft pick, also expressed interest in Elway, and Elway was equally interested, saying that he was impressed with their coach, Chuck Knox, and also pointed out that his parents came from that part of the northwest, and that his then bride-to-be was from nearby Tacoma. Demoff would later say that Seattle was "very sincere" about their interest in Elway, but he noted that he knew Seattle were looking at drafting a running back too, and even though they wanted Elway, Demoff said he wrote in his journal, "I think (Seattle) is just going to take a running back and be happy." Seattle would end up drafting running back Curt Warner instead. Warner went on to have an injury-shortened Pro Bowl career in Seattle.
- The Colts nearly made a trade with the Dallas Cowboys. Elway was a big fan of the Cowboys when he'd been growing up, and a trade to Dallas seemed ideal, given that the Cowboys had quarterback Danny White, who'd played for the head coach of the Colts, Frank Kush, at Arizona State. According to Gil Brandt, the Cowboys offered three starting players, including White, and two first-round draft picks to the Colts, but the deal was lost when Irsay intervened.

In the end the Colts trade Elway to the Denver Broncos in a deal that was done by Irsay without Accorsi's consent; part of the terms of that deal involved Irsay getting paid a large amount of money for upcoming preseason games vs. Denver, which was a major factor in Accorsi resigning his position.

The film's main subplot chronicles Dan Marino's initially miserable draft day, as unfounded rumors about him using drugs while playing for Pitt (at one point, Marino's Pitt teammate, good friend, and 1983 1st-round pick with the Chicago Bears Jimbo Covert relates with disgust how several teams told him they "knew" Marino was a drug user and asked him if Covert used drugs as well) led to him falling down in the 1st-round as objectively less-talented QBs like Todd Blackledge and Ken O'Brien were taken ahead of him. But the story changes for Marino when an already-excellent team, the Miami Dolphins made it clear they were going to take him with the 27th pick in the 1st round and did so. The film shows the varied reactions from ESPN's commentators (Paul Zimmerman castigates Miami for taking Marino but steps on his argument when he cites the Dolphins' defensive coordinator in relation to the coaching he's sure Marino needs, while Chris Berman both then and now politely but clearly dismisses Dr. Z's historically failed views by saying that "I think it was more of a coaching staff question with Miami. Well, it's Don Shula. It's OK.").

An additional subplot focuses on Jim Kelly, who, after hearing Elway didn't want to play for the Colts, expressed to his agent his own desire to not play in cold weather either; saying that the three teams he didn't want to play for were the Minnesota Vikings, the Green Bay Packers or the Buffalo Bills. Watching the draft with his family, Kelly says that when the Bills first drafted Tony Hunter, he was so happy, he jumped up and cheered, accidentally knocking his mother over. However, the Bills had another first-round pick, and used it two picks later to draft Kelly. While in a meeting with Bills afterwards, preparing to sign a contract with the Bills, an executive from the USFL called the Bills' office, and an unknowing secretary forwarded the call to Kelly, who was then offered to join the USFL as an undrafted free-agent, and would end up signing with the Houston Gamblers.

It's also noted that the other team that went to (and won) the previous year's Super Bowl, Washington, finished the 1983 1st-round by also taking a player who would someday be in the Hall of Fame: cornerback Darrell Green.

== Background ==
The 1983 draft is frequently referred to as the draft with the quarterback class of 1983, because six quarterbacks were taken in the first round, an unusually high number.

Of these quarterbacks, four played in the Super Bowl, four were selected to play in the Pro Bowl, and three have been inducted into the Pro Football Hall of Fame, with only one of the six—Todd Blackledge—achieving none of these. The next highest number of quarterbacks taken in the first round is the five taken in the 1999, 2018, and 2021 NFL draft. All six quarterbacks were drafted by American Football Conference (AFC) teams, with every member of the five-team AFC East (the Colts, Dolphins, Bills, Jets and Patriots) selecting a quarterback. In eleven of the sixteen years following this draft, the AFC was represented in the Super Bowl by a team led by one of these quarterbacks: the Denver Broncos by John Elway (five times), the Buffalo Bills by Jim Kelly (four times), the Miami Dolphins by Dan Marino (once), or the New England Patriots by Tony Eason (once). Kelly, Marino, Elway and Ken O'Brien all reached a Pro Bowl at least twice.

Of the six first round quarterbacks drafted, two did not sign with the teams that selected them for the 1983 season. First overall pick Elway, who had made his antipathy towards the Colts known long before the draft, was also a promising baseball player in the New York Yankees organization. With Yankees owner George Steinbrenner aggressively pursuing a commitment from Elway to play baseball full-time. The other was Jim Kelly, who was selected 14th overall by the Buffalo Bills but would turn them down initially to play with the Houston Gamblers in the USFL, before joining the Bills in 1986 and playing his entire Hall of Fame career with the team.

== See also ==
- List of American football films
