= Buzkashi Boys =

2012 short film by Sam French

- Film poster
- Directed by: Sam French
- Written by: Martin Desmond Roe
- Produced by: Ariel Nasr
- Starring: Fawad Mohammadi; Jawanmard Paiz; Wali Talash
- Music by: Jim Dooley
- Production companies: Afghan Film Project; Development Pictures
- Distributed by: ShortsHD
- Release date: December 7, 2012 (Santa Fe International Film Festival)
- Running time: 29 minutes
- Countries: Afghanistan; United States
- Language: Dari

Buzkashi Boys is a 2012 film directed by Sam French, and co-produced in Afghanistan and the United States. It was nominated for the 2013 Academy Award for Best Live Action Short Film.

After being nominated for an Oscar, the film was released along with all the other 15 Oscar-nominated short films in theaters by ShortsHD.

== Production ==
In the film, Jawanmard Paiez plays a street kid who forms a friendship with a blacksmith’s son, played by Fawad Mohammadi. Mohammadi was a street vendor in real life, selling maps and souvenirs in Kabul. Their roles in the film reversed their real-life circumstances, with the production team casting Mohammadi based on his personality, which aligned with the character of the blacksmith's son. While filming one scene on the streets of Kabul, Paiz was mistaken by a relative for a beggar, as he had dressed in tattered clothing and waved an incense burner for the role.

== Plot ==
Filmed entirely on location in Kabul, Afghanistan, Buzkashi Boys tells the coming of age story of two best friends – a street urchin and a blacksmith's son – who dream of a better life. Rafi, whose family has long worked as blacksmiths, bridles under his father's insistence that he follow in his footsteps.

His best friend Ahmad, a penniless orphan, survives by begging for coins in exchange for a puff of incense from his makeshift censer—a tin can swung from a piece of wire. Seeking to escape their destinies, the two friends dream of becoming champion horsemen in Afghanistan's national sport, Buzkashi—a dangerous form of polo played on horseback with a headless goat carcass instead of a ball. When Ahmad decides to steal a horse to prove he can realize his dreams, things spiral out of control and Rafi must come to terms with the reality of his situation.

== Accolades ==
=== Film festival awards ===
- L.A. Shorts Fest – Drama: Best-of Category
- Raindance Film Festival – Best International Short Film
- UK Film Festival – Best Cinematography
- Evolution International Film Festival – Best Short Film
- Rhode Island International Film Festival – Best Cinematography
- ÉCU The European Independent Film festival – Best Non-European Independent Dramatic Short 2013

=== Award nominations ===
- 85th Academy Awards – Best Live Action Short Film

== See also ==
- The Boxing Girls of Kabul, a 2012 documentary directed by Ariel Nasr
