= Peter Bussian =

American photographer and filmmaker

Peter Bussian is an American independent filmmaker, photographer and visual media consultant who is known mainly for his work with refugees and other international development issues.

Bussian has consulted on international development projects in developing, conflict and post conflict countries in the Middle East, South Asia, Africa and South America.

Bussian has received awards for his photographs from the International Photography Awards (Lucies) and Interaction.

He has written, produced, directed and/or photographed documentary films in Sudan, Iraq and Afghanistan on displaced persons, climate change and other topics for the United Nations and United States Agency for International Development.

Bussian has held several photographic exhibitions, including "The Afghans: Pictures of Resilience 2001 – 2011", which was exhibited at Gallery 169 and Sharq Gallery, both in Los Angeles. The exhibit was also displayed at the Council on Foreign Relations in New York throughout 2012.

He is the author and photographer of the book "Passage to Afghanistan" (Skyhorse, 2016).

Bussian played the lead role in Afghan director Siddiq Barmak's film Opium War, which was Afghanistan's official submission to the 2009 Academy Awards and won several film festival awards, including the Golden Marc’Aurelio Critics’ Award for Best Film at the Rome Film Festival.

Bussian is developing several independent feature film projects, including Scarlet Poppy, an authentic love story set in Afghanistan. The project has been featured at the Busan International Film Festival, International Film Festival of India, the Independent Filmmaker Project "No Borders" and the Dubai International Film Festival

In 2020, Bussian released a book of portraits entitled "Trans New York: Photos and Stories of Transgender New Yorkers." The book was published by Apollo Publishers, with a foreword by transgender activist and author Abby Stein.

He graduated from Boulder High School. He received a bachelor of arts from the University of Colorado Boulder and studied film in the MFA program at Columbia University.

He lives in New York and has twin boys.
