= Plainfield Teachers College =

Fictitious college created as a hoax

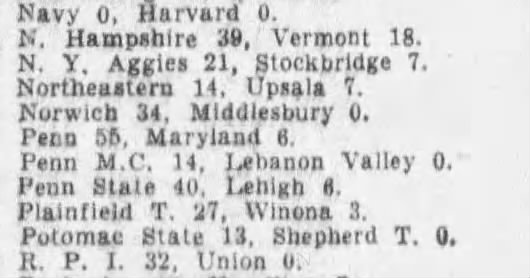
Partial newspaper listing of college football scores from October 27, 1941—the fictitious win by Plainfield Teachers College ("Plainfield T.") over Winona is listed immediately below Penn State's legitimate win over Lehigh.

Plainfield Teachers College was a fictitious college football team created as a hoax. During the 1941 college football season, several co-conspirators called several prominent American newspapers reporting the college's supposed dominance in football. These reports were initially widely believed, with the school's scores and victories published in regional Philadelphia newspapers and The New York Times sports department, before being exposed.

== The hoax ==
Stockbroker Morris Newburger and radio sales executive Alexander "Bink" Dannenbaum jointly planned the hoax in 1941. Using the name Jerry Croyden, Newburger phoned several New York papers while Dannenbaum contacted Philadelphia papers, reporting Plainfield's dominant victories over several other fictitious schools. Early reports in Philadelphia and New York featured conflicting scores, though later reports were consistent.

Newburger and Dannenbaum later invented other details about the team, including a sophomore running back named Johnny "The Celestial Comet" Chung, who supposedly ate rice on the sideline to gain an advantage. Reports listed "Hop-Along" Hobelitz as the team's coach. There was even speculation that Plainfield might secure a bid to a small-college bowl game; in fact, Newburger had already planned for the team to "play" in the non-existent "Blackboard Bowl" in Atlantic City at season's end.

Reporter Red Smith from the Philadelphia Record (one of the papers reporting the fake results) later went to Plainfield, New Jersey, to search for the school. (At the time, New Jersey had real teacher colleges in Jersey City, Newark, Paterson, Montclair, Glassboro, and Trenton; none of them fielded football teams, as most of their students were female.) After finding no such school, the hoax came to light.

Newburger and Dannenbaum confessed the hoax afterwards, later releasing a false press release from school administrator Jerry Croyden stating that Plainfield had cancelled its remaining schedule as Chung and several other players were declared academically ineligible due to failed exams. The hoax was generally well received afterwards, with several newspapers that had reported on Plainfield publishing tributes and acknowledgements. Columnist Franklin Pierce Adams of the New-York Tribune wrote a song for Plainfield, to the tune of Cornell's "Far Above Cayuga's Waters": "Far above New Jersey's swamplands / Plainfield Teachers' spires! / Mark a phony, ghostly college / That got on the wires...!"

=== 1941 season ===
All games and opponents are fictitious.

| Week | Day | Date | Opponent | Result | Ref. |
|---|---|---|---|---|---|
| 1 | | | Benson Institute | W | |
| 2 | | | Scott | W 12–0 | |
| 3 | | | Chesterton | W 24–0 | |
| 4 | | | Fox | W | |
| 5 | Saturday | October 25 | Winona | W 27–3 | |
| 6 | Saturday | November 1 | Randolph Tech | W 35–0 | |
| 7 | Saturday | November 8 | Ingersoll | W 13–0 | |
| 8 | Saturday | November 15 | Appalachian Normal | cancelled | |
| 9 | Saturday | November 22 | Harmony Teachers | cancelled | |
| 10 | | | Blackboard Bowl at Atlantic City | cancelled | |

== See also ==
- Maguire University, a fictitious college invented in 1963 for the sole purpose of receiving free tickets to basketball games
- H. Rochester Sneath, a fictional character created in a series of hoax letters starting in 1948
- North Central College, founded as Plainfield College in 1861 and known as such until 1864
