= Two Distant Strangers =

2020 short film

- Official release poster
- Directed by: Travon Free; Martin Desmond Roe
- Screenplay by: Travon Free
- Produced by: Van Lathan; Lawrence Bender; Jesse Williams; Chris Uettwiller; Sean Combs; Mickey Meyer; Terrence J
- Starring: Joey Badass; Andrew Howard
- Cinematography: Jessica Young
- Edited by: Alex Odesmith
- Music by: James Poyser
- Production companies: Dirty Robber; NowThis; Six Feet Over
- Distributed by: Netflix
- Release date: November 20, 2020
- Running time: 32 minutes
- Country: United States
- Language: English
- Box office: $443,050 (all short films)

Two Distant Strangers is a 2020 American short film written by Travon Free and directed by Free and Martin Desmond Roe. The film examines the deaths of Black Americans during encounters with police through the eyes of a character trapped in a time loop that keeps ending in his death. Two Distant Strangers won the award for Best Live Action Short Film at the 93rd Academy Awards, marking distributor Netflix's first win in the category.

== Plot ==
In New York City, graphic designer Carter James tries to get home to his dog, Jeter, the morning after a first date, only to find himself trapped in a time loop in which he is repeatedly confronted in the street by an NYPD officer, Merk. Merk wonders whether Carter is smoking a joint and wants to search his bag. Each encounter ends with Carter being killed by the police, then waking up in the bed of his date, Perri. (Note: Carter's first death resembles the killing of Eric Garner in 2014 and the murder of George Floyd in May 2020. Travon Free wrote the script in July 2020.) In one version of the loop, riot police burst into Perri's apartment, mistaking it for a different apartment because the door number is hanging upside down, and shoot him there. (Note: Alluding to the 2020 killing of Breonna Taylor)

After 99 deaths, Carter decides to discuss the situation with Officer Merk. Carter tells him about the time loop, offering Merk evidence by correctly predicting what people around them will do next. Carter asks Merk to drive him home. The journey ends without mishap; Merk and Carter get out of the patrol car and shake hands. But as Carter turns to enter his apartment building, Merk starts applauding what he calls Carter's "noble performance", revealing that Merk remembers the previous loops too. Merk then shoots him in the back, while a pool of blood starts forming in the shape of Africa, and says "See you tomorrow, kid". Carter wakes up once more in Perri's bed.

Undeterred, Carter leaves Perri's apartment to make yet another effort to get home. As the song "The Way It Is" plays, names of Black Americans who have died in encounters with police are listed.

== Cast ==
- Joey Badass as Carter James
- Andrew Howard as Merk, an NYPD officer
- Zaria Simone as Perri, Carter's date

== Release ==
In March 2021, Netflix acquired the distribution rights and made the film available from April 9.

== Controversy ==
In April 2021, Cynthia Kao posted a video on the social media site TikTok indirectly alleging that Two Distant Strangers was inspired by a short film she directed in December 2016 titled Groundhog Day For a Black Man, due to their similar plot and their connections with the social media news outlet NowThis, which led to accusations of plagiarism.

Two Distant Strangers and Groundhog Day For a Black Man are both about a black man trying to relive the same day over and over until he can survive a police altercation. In 2020, during the George Floyd protests, NowThis contacted Kao about featuring the film on their Facebook and Instagram pages. The following year, Netflix released Two Distant Strangers in collaboration with NowThis.

NowThis responded to the claims, citing the fact that the film was independently conceived and in final production before they became involved, disputing any connection to Kao. Additionally, Travon Free, writer and co-director of the short film, responded that claims of inspiration and plagiarism are "baseless" and "absurd".

== Reception ==
=== Critical response ===
On the review aggregator website Rotten Tomatoes, 94% of 16 critics' reviews are positive, with an average rating of 7.20/10.

=== Accolades ===
Award	Date of ceremony	Category	Recipient(s)	Result	Ref.
Academy Awards	April 25, 2021	Best Live Action Short Film	Travon Free and Martin Desmond Roe	Won	
African-American Film Critics Association	April 7, 2021	Best Short Film	Two Distant Strangers	Won	

== See also ==
- List of films featuring time loops
- Black Lives Matter
- See You Yesterday (2019), Netflix film with a similar concept
- Day Break (2006), television series about a black cop who is being framed for a murder and is caught in a time loop while trying to solve the case.
- Groundhog Day (1993)
- Woke, television series similar in content
- 12:01 PM (1990), Oscar-nominated short similar in content
- "Changes," 1992 song by Tupac Shakur that samples Bruce Hornsby & the Range's "The Way It Is" and lends this film its title (Note: v. 1, ln. 16: "Learn to see me as your brother 'stead of two distant strangers")
