= 2009 Academy Awards =

2009 Academy Awards may refer to:

- 81st Academy Awards, the Academy Awards ceremony which took place in 2009
- 82nd Academy Awards, the Academy Awards ceremony which took place in 2010
