= Sadaffe Abid =

Social entrepreneur

- Education: B.A Economics, International relations. Masters in Public Administration, Mount Holyoke College (1995), Harvard Business school (2008)
- Occupation: Social entrepreneur
- Title: Founder CIRCLE, She loves tech

Sadaffe Abid is a social entrepreneur from Karachi, Pakistan and the former COO and CEO of Kashf Foundation. She is the founder of tech-organization CIRCLE, and its current CEO. She is also a Vice Chairperson of Pakistan Microfinance Network.

== Personal life ==
Sadaffe hails from the city of Karachi. She was born into a military family due to which she moved to many different places along with her parents. Her family had been posted to Khariaan, Noushera, and Rawalpindi.

She attended Army Public School until 6th grade and later joined a private school Beacon House School system in her 7th grade. Sadaffe did her B.A in economics, International relations from Mount Holyoke College and graduated in 1995. She then went to Harvard Business School in 2008 and attended Advanced Management Program in 2009 from INSEAD. Sadaffe has also completed her Master's in Public Administration from Harvard University Kennedy School of Government.

== Career ==
She joined the Kashf Foundation as a founding team member in April 1997, and created a non-profit, micro-finance and wealth management organization. The foundation is the first Micro Finance Institution (MFI) in Pakistan. She served the Kashf Foundation for 8 years as the COO and then 2 years as the CEO of the organization. During her time at Kashf, Sadaffe expanded the organization. During her tenure, Kashf received the AGFUND International Prize and Grameen Trust Microfinance Excellence Award.

She has since then also served as a CEO of Buksh Foundation, another micro finance institution. She has also worked as a Gulf Representative at Mercy Corps in Dubai and a guest lecturer at CEDEP at INSEAD. Sadaffe has also worked at National Bank of Pakistan (NBP), where she is in the board of directors and Chair of Inclusive Committee.

She is currently running an enterprise she co-founded called CIRCLE; a tech-organization encouraging women in tech ventures. She is a consultant for the International Finance Corporation on gender diversity and is a social entrepreneur at INSEAD. Since 2014, Sadaffe has also lectured on social entrepreneurship at CEDEP, INSEAD.

Sadaffe is also on the board of Pakistan Microfinance Network, UN Women Pakistan Civil Society Advisory Council and Indus Earth. She is an advisor to the global Dell Women Entrepreneurship Network (DWEN).

=== Circle ===
Sadaffe stated that her goal is “Women Economic Empowerment and Inclusion”. She founded CIRCLE to empower women through technology. CIRCLE is a social tech-enterprise aimed at improving women's economic empowerment to help build and develop the entrepreneurial and leadership capacity of women. The organization has been working in Pakistan since 2014 to provide economic participation and empowerment to women in the IT sector.
