= Travon Free =

American comedian, actor, writer, and one-time college basketball player

Travon Free (born 1984 or 1985) is an American comedian, actor and writer. He has written for Full Frontal with Samantha Bee, The Daily Show on Comedy Central, and Any Given Wednesday with Bill Simmons on HBO.

Free won an Emmy Award for his work on The Daily Show and won an Academy Award for Two Distant Strangers in the Best Live Action Short Film category.

== Early life and education ==
Growing up with his mother and grandmother in Compton, California, Free attended Dominguez High School, where he played basketball; in 2002, the Los Angeles Times called him the "team's best player".

He attended California State University, Long Beach, and played college basketball for the Long Beach State 49ers. While injured with a torn meniscus in his right knee that required surgery, he entertained the team with his humor, which was a prelude to his career in comedy. In college, Free took a comedy writing class and performed at Laugh Factory in Hollywood and The Ice House Club in Pasadena, California.

== Career ==
In 2011, Free started out as a regular host of an online series The Gentlemen's Rant. Free began writing for The Daily Show in October 2012, after coming in second place in a contest to win a position working for the show. For his work there, he won a Primetime Emmy Award for Outstanding Writing for a Variety Series in 2015. He has also had recurring roles on the shows Tosh.0 and Chelsea Lately.

In 2016, Free wrote for the HBO show Any Given Wednesday, and the following year he was hired as a writer for Full Frontal with Samantha Bee. In 2018, he appeared on the cover of Gay Times. He was a producer that year on the HBO series Camping.

In 2019, Free joined other Writers Guild of America members in firing his agents as part of the Guild's stand against the Association of Talent Agents and the practice of packaging.

Free wrote and co-directed Two Distant Strangers, which won the Academy Award for Best Live Action Short Film in 2021. In 2023, Free co-directed BS High a documentary for HBO, revolving around the Bishop Sycamore High School scandal.

== Controversy ==
In November 2018, after a series of anti-Semitic tweets from 2010 and 2011 were discovered in Free's Twitter feed, HBO said that the company had no plans to work with him in the future and stated that "This kind of language is deeply offensive and inexcusable." Free apologized, saying that the tweets were "stupid and really offensive jokes."

Controversy emerged in April 2021, after Cynthia Kao posted a video on the social media site TikTok, alleging that Free's Two Distant Strangers was plagiarized from a comedy sketch she had directed in December 2016 titled Groundhog Day For a Black Man. The plot of Kao's film, she claims, is similar to the plot of Two Distant Strangers, which are both about a black man trying to relive the same day over and over until he can survive a police altercation. Furthermore, in 2020, during the George Floyd protests, social media news outlet NowThis contacted Kao about featuring the film on their Facebook and Instagram pages. The following year, Netflix released Two Distant Strangers in collaboration with NowThis, excluding any credit of Kao's name or that she had anything to do with the original idea for the movie in any way.

== Personal life ==
In 2011, Free came out as bisexual. He lives between New York and Los Angeles and collects shoes.

== See also ==
- List of LGBT sportspeople
- List of The Daily Show writers
