= Maguire University =

Fictitious college in Illinois, US

Maguire University, phantom college

Maguire University is a fictitious college invented in 1963 by a group of Chicago high school basketball coaches for the sole purpose of receiving free tickets to the Final Four basketball games, which the NCAA allotted university coaches.

== History ==
The idea was hatched by John Maguire and a group of characters at Maguire's Pub in Forest Park, Illinois.

The phone number and address that "Maguire University" listed in the NCAA's registry belonged to Maguire's Pub, and when out-of-state coaches asked to book games, bar staff were trained to respond that the team's schedule was already full.

Maguire University's hoax continued until 1973, when the Chicago Tribune published an article about the scheme.

The coaches continued to attend the Final Four, purchasing the tickets with their own money, even after Maguire University was busted. The annual tradition has continued for more than six decades and Maguire University has merch, class rings, a hall of fame, and rolling online applications. The team's motto, "We Play Hurt", is a reference to the hangovers accrued by Maguire's "students".

Kelly's Pub, on Webster Street in Chicago, has served as the college's "campus" since Maguire's Pub closed in 1988.

== See also ==
- Plainfield Teachers College, a fictitious college football team created as a hoax during the 1941 season
