= Ariel Nasr =

Canadian documentary film director

Ariel Nasr is a Canadian documentary film director. He is most noted as director of the films The Boxing Girls of Kabul, which won the Canadian Screen Award for Best Short Documentary at the 1st Canadian Screen Awards in 2013, and The Forbidden Reel, which was a winner of the Audience Award at the 2020 Hot Docs Canadian International Documentary Festival, and as producer of Buzkashi Boys, which was an Academy Award nominee for Best Live Action Short Film at the 85th Academy Awards in 2013.

Nasr was born and raised in Halifax, Nova Scotia, and educated at the University of King's College. Of Afghan descent, he has cited the War in Afghanistan as an important formative influence on his work, and concentrates primarily on films about the culture of Afghanistan and Afghan immigrants to Canada.

His other films have included Good Morning Kandahar (2008), The Long Way Home (2017) and The Mosque: A Community's Struggle (2020), a film about the 2017 Quebec City mosque shooting, where a lone gunman killed six worshippers were killed and seriously injured five others.

In 2024 he won the TIFF-CBC Films Screenwriter Award for his feature film screenplay Daudistan.
