= Fishing Adventurer =

Fishing Adventurer is a TV show, broadcast since 2005 in twelve European countries as well as in the United-States.
The show deals with adventure, travel and sport fishing.

== History ==
Fishing Adventurer was created by Cyril Chauquet in Canada, in 2003.
Produced originally in partnership with Filmoption International, the TV Show is hosted and directed by Cyril Chauquet. The show is produced in Canada where Cyril Chauquet resides part-time. The show is also broadcast in Canada.

== Team ==
- Producer, director and host : Cyril Chauquet
- Development, communication and agent : Suzy Moore (Moore Communication)
- In total, thirty subcontractors contribute to the production of the show.

== Synopsis of the show ==
Each episode takes the viewer on a trip with the charismatic and dynamic host Cyril Chauquet. Each trip is an adventure full of anecdotes, encounters and challenges to get to the predator fish Cyril has in mind. This documentary-lifestyle series takes viewers to the four corners of our planet, to discover and learn about all sorts of exotic and mysterious fish, cultures, beautiful landscapes and different people who open the doors to their lives and share their stories with the viewer. The series is all about the passion for sport fishing and travel and the ties that bind fishermen around the world, whether they fish for fun or to feed their families.

== Values of the show ==
Fishing Adventurer is a mix of adventure, sport fishing, travel and culture in an entertaining show. The goal is to provide viewers with a modern and fun vision of the sport as well as to educate on cultures, the world in general, and predator fish. "I want to show the exciting and dynamic aspects of fishing while educating on new species, new countries and promoting conservation", Cyril Chauquet.

A quote from a Toronto journalist (Canada): “this is a real TV fishing show that combines traveling and sports fishing, [...] and each trip, although motivated by the sport, is [first] a spontaneous adventure.

== Production ==
Two seasons have been produced and broadcast since 2005:

- The first season comprises 13 episodes of 26 minutes: Cuba, Sweden, Guinea-Bissau, Nicaragua, Morocco, New York, Venezuela, Quebec, Costa Rica, Texas, Ireland, Louisiana, Ontario
- The second season comprises 16 episodes of 44 minutes: Puerto Rico, Belize, Mexico (Sea of Cortez), Quebec (James Bay), Nunavik, Florida, Mexico (Baja California), Egypt, French Guiana, Honduras, Panama, Kenya, Tanzania, Quebec Rupert River, Quebec Abitibi Témiscamingue.

Several other episodes on fishing in Quebec are reserved for broadcast in the United-States and Quebec.

- The third season is currently in production. Its release is scheduled for late 2011.

== Broadcast ==
Fishing Adventurer airs on:

- ESPN2 (Outdoors) in the United States
- Discovery Channel in Europe (United-Kingdom, Germany, Italy)
- CTV Travel and Escape in Canada
- Also broadcast on the travel channel in French Canada on Évasion under the title Mordu de la Pêche

In all, the show is broadcast in 12 countries, including 9 European countries: England, Scotland, Wales, Ireland, Italy, Switzerland, Germany, Spain and Portugal.

== Viewers profile ==
- Anglers, travelers and outdoor enthusiasts in general, 18 to 50 years old, male and female. A show that has attracted the attention of large secondary fan base of non fishermen and children.

== Partnerships ==
- Since 2008, in partnership with the Quebec Outfitters Federation and Moore Communication, Tourism Quebec has been advertising within the commercial time of Fishing Adventurer in the United States on the sports network : ESPN2.
- Also, the Ministry of Natural Resources of Quebec (Canada) is an active partner in the TV show. The Québec Ministry partners with episodes that are filmed in the Province of Quebec. The partnership contributes scientific information and facts to the show’s content.

== Projects ==
- Continuing to produce additional episodes and seasons of the series Fishing Adventurer
- Create new concepts of shows and documentaries to further explore subjects dealt with in the show
- Support organizations and charities promoting sustainable development, water and fish stocks conservation,
- Create educational fishing and nature camps for kids
- Promote fishing for an ever-younger audience, informing it to pollution concerns, respect of the fishery and conservation.

== Website ==
Fishing Adventurer
