= Cyril Chauquet =

French fisherman and television presenter

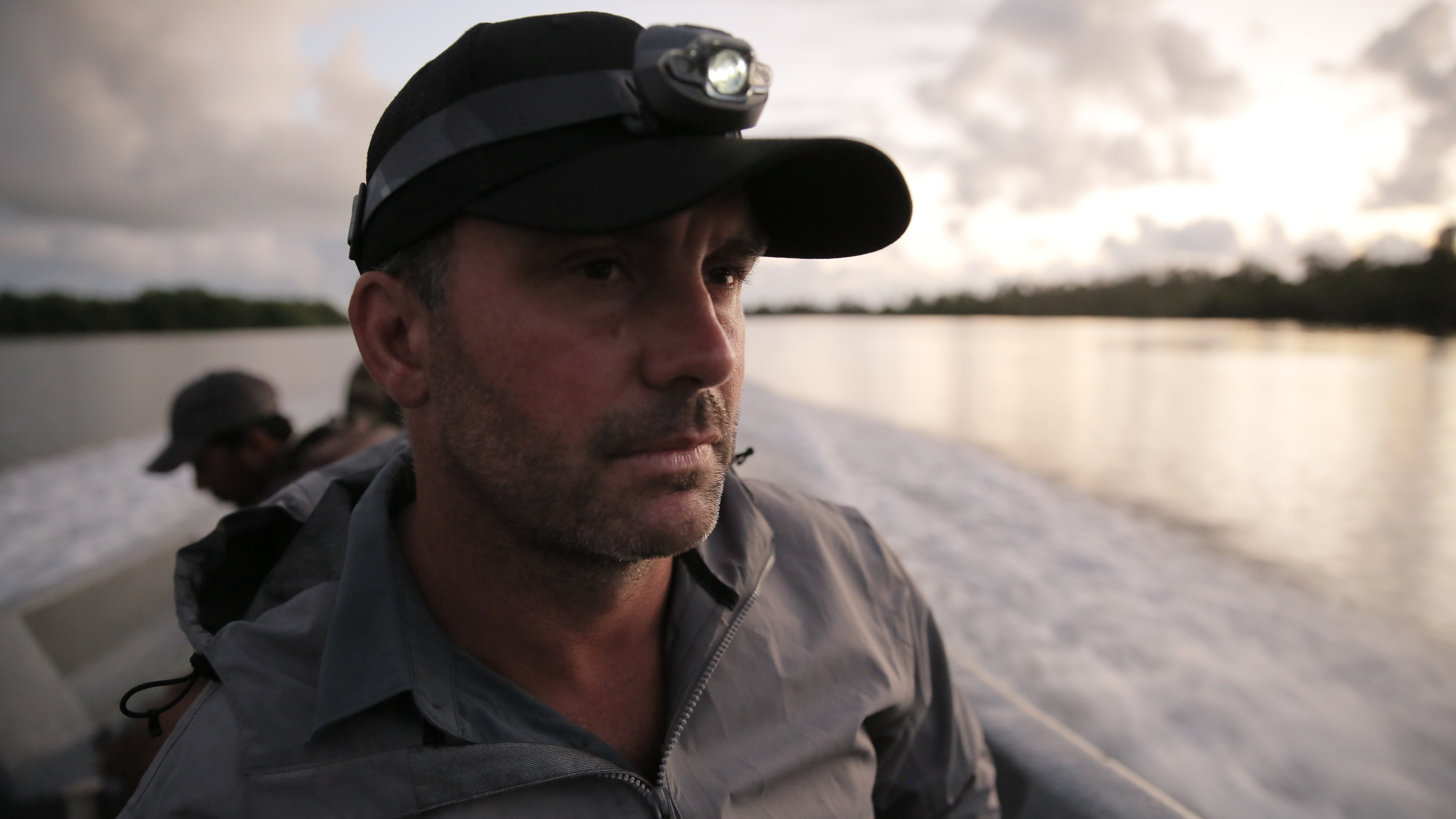
Cyril Chauquet, Chasing Monsters TV host

Cyril Chauquet is the host of TV shows Chasing Monsters and Fishing Adventurer.

Cyril Chauquet seeks colossal and dangerous underwater creatures in the Chasing Monsters series, created in 2015. The first two seasons now air in 120 countries. This show can be seen by a variety of ages in the 7's and higher.

Fishing Adventurer has been broadcast since 2005 in Canada, in twelve European countries as well as in the United States. The show deals with adventure and sport fishing.
