= 2022 Cinéfest Sudbury International Film Festival =

- Opening film: Ashgrove by Jeremy LaLonde
- Closing film: Beautiful Minds (Presque) by Bernard Campan and Alexandre Jollien
- Location: Sudbury, Ontario, Canada
- Founded: 1989
- Festival date: September 17–25, 2022
- Website: cinefest.com

Cinéfest Sudbury International Film Festival
- 2023 2021

The 2022 edition of the Cinéfest Sudbury International Film Festival, the 34th edition in the event's history, took place from September 17 to 25, 2022 in Sudbury, Ontario, Canada. The lineup was announced on August 25.

Similarly to the 2022 Toronto International Film Festival, the event returned to primarily in-person screenings for the first time since the beginning of the COVID-19 pandemic in 2020, although a selection of films was still offered for home viewing on a virtual platform. Organizers indicated that they received an all-time record number of film submissions for inclusion in the festival.

It was the last edition of the festival to be held under executive director Tammy Frick, who was appointed chief executive officer of the Academy of Canadian Cinema and Television in October 2022.

== Awards ==
Award	Film	Filmmaker
Audience Choice, Feature Film (Live Screening)	Bones of Crows	Marie Clements
Audience Choice, Feature Film (Virtual)	Norbourg	Maxime Giroux
Audience Choice, Documentary (Live Screening)	Buffy Sainte-Marie: Carry It On	Madison Thomas
Audience Choice, Documentary (Virtual)	Okay!: The ASD Band Film	Mark Bone
Audience Choice, Short Film (Live Screening)	Spiral (Kierre)	Salla Sorri, Eva-Maria Koskinen
Audience Choice, Short Film (Virtual)	Meneath: The Hidden Island of Ethics	Terril Calder
Outstanding Canadian Feature	Riceboy Sleeps	Anthony Shim
Outstanding International Feature	Beautiful Minds (Presque)	Bernard Campan, Alexandre Jollien
Outstanding Female-Led Feature Film	Call Jane	Phyllis Nagy
Cinema Indigenized Outstanding Talent	Buffy Sainte-Marie: Carry It On	Madison Thomas
French-Language Feature Film	Viking	Stéphane Lafleur
Inspiring Voices and Perspectives	To Kill a Tiger	Nisha Pahuja
Outstanding Short Film	Aska	Clara Milo
Outstanding Emerging Canadian Short Filmmaker	A Shore Away (L'Autre rive)	Gaëlle Graton
Outstanding Northern Ontario Short Film	Becoming Tom Thomson	Steve Belford

== Official selections ==
=== Gala Presentations ===
English title	Original title	Director(s)	Production country
Alice, Darling		Mary Nighy	Canada, United States
Ashgrove		Jeremy LaLonde	Canada
Beautiful Minds	Presque	Bernard Campan, Alexandre Jollien	France
Broker	브로커	Hirokazu Kore-eda	South Korea
Call Jane		Phyllis Nagy	United States
North of Normal		Carly Stone	Canada
The Return of Tanya Tucker: Featuring Brandi Carlile		Kathlyn Horan	United States
The Swearing Jar		Lindsay Mackay	Canada
Viking		Stéphane Lafleur	Canada

=== Special Presentations ===
English title	Original title	Director(s)	Production country
752 Is Not a Number		Babak Payami	Canada
Aftersun		Charlotte Wells	United Kingdom, United States
Arlette		Mariloup Wolfe	Canada
Black Ice		Hubert Davis	Canada
Brother		Clement Virgo	Canada
Confessions of a Hitman	Confessions	Luc Picard	Canada
Emily		Frances O'Connor	United Kingdom, United States
Falcon Lake		Charlotte Le Bon	Canada, France
Hunt	헌트, Heonteu	Lee Jung-jae	South Korea
Little Nicholas: Happy As Can Be	Le Petit Nicolas - Qu’est-ce qu’on attend pour être heureux ?	Amandine Fredon, Benjamin Massoubre	France
One Fine Morning	Un beau matin	Mia Hansen-Løve	France, Germany
Return to Seoul	Retour à Séoul	Davy Chou	France
Riceboy Sleeps		Anthony Shim	Canada
Rosie		Gail Maurice	Canada
Triangle of Sadness		Ruben Östlund	Sweden, Germany, France, United Kingdom, United States
Until Branches Bend		Sophie Jarvis	Canada
You Can Live Forever		Sarah Watts, Mark Slutsky	Canada
You Will Remember Me	Tu te souviendras de moi	Éric Tessier	Canada

=== Features Canada ===
English title	Original title	Director(s)	Production country
Babysitter		Monia Chokri	Canada
The Breach		Rodrigo Gudiño	Canada
The End of Sex		Sean Garrity	Canada
Happy FKN Sunshine		Derek Diorio	Canada
I Like Movies		Chandler Levack	Canada
In Broad Daylight	Au grand jour	Emmanuel Tardif	Canada
Norbourg		Maxime Giroux	Canada
North of Albany	Au nord d'Albany	Marianne Farley	Canada
Polaris		Kirsten Carthew	Canada
The Protector		Lenin M. Sivam	Canada
Relax, I'm from the Future		Luke Higginson	Canada
So Much Tenderness		Lina Rodriguez	Canada
Soft-Spoken Weepy Cult Child		Irina Lord	Canada
Something You Said Last Night		Luis De Filippis	Canada
Stay the Night		Renuka Jeyapalan	Canada
The Switch (La Switch)		Michel Kandinsky	Canada
Tenzin		Michael Leblanc, Josh Reichmann	Canada
That Kind of Summer	Un été comme ça	Denis Côté	Canada
We're All in This Together		Katie Boland	Canada

=== Documentaries ===
English title	Original title	Director(s)	Production country
The Ashgrove Experiment		Christopher Warre Smets	Canada
Bernie Langille Wants to Know What Happened to Bernie Langille		Jackie Torrens	Canada
A Bunch of Amateurs		Kim Hopkins	United Kingdom
Doug and the Slugs and Me		Teresa Alfield	Canada
Forest for the Trees		Rita Leistner	Canada
Framing Agnes		Chase Joynt	Canada
Love in the Time of Fentanyl		Colin Askey	Canada
Million Dollar Pigeons		Gavin FitzGerald	Ireland
Okay!: The ASD Band Film		Mark Bone	Canada
Part of the Pack		Isabelle Groc, Mike McKinlay	Canada
REVIVAL69: The Concert That Rocked the World		Ron Chapman	Canada
Tiger 24		Warren Pereira	United States
To Kill a Tiger		Nisha Pahuja	Canada

=== World Cinema ===
English title	Original title	Director(s)	Production country
Close		Lukas Dhont	Belgium, Netherlands, France
Echo		Mareike Wegener	Germany
Final Cut	Coupez!	Michel Hazanavicius	France
A Fleeting Encounter	Une histoire provisoire	Romed Wyder	Luxembourg, Switzerland
Free Skate		Roope Olenius	Finland
Grounds of Hope	À terre promise	Lionel Bernardin	France
Hard Shell, Soft Shell	Fragile	Emma Benestan	France
Holy Spider		Ali Abbasi	Denmark, Germany, Sweden, France
Lost Illusions	Illusions perdues	Xavier Giannoli	France, Belgium
Metronom		Alexandru Belc	Romania, France
Pacifiction	Tourment sur les îles	Albert Serra	France, Spain, Germany, Portugal
Peter von Kant		François Ozon	France
Piggy	Cerdita	Carlota Pereda	Spain, France
Shadows		Carlo Lavagna	Italy
Something in the Dirt		Justin Benson, Aaron Moorhead	United States

=== Cinema Indigenized ===
English title	Original title	Director(s)	Production country
Bones of Crows		Marie Clements	Canada
Ever Deadly		Chelsea McMullan, Tanya Tagaq	Canada
The Issue with Tissue		Michael Zelniker	Canada
The Klabona Keepers		Tamo Campos, Jasper Snow-Rosen	Canada
Stories of Decolonization: (De)Colonial Relations		Gladys Rowe, Teddy Zegeye-Gebrehiwot, Elizabeth Carlson-Manathara	Canada

=== Shorts ===
English title	Original title	Director(s)	Production country
Alex		Aisha Evelyna	Canada
Anaconda		Joshua D. Amar	United States
Aska		Clara Milo	Canada
Beauty Queen		Myra Aquino	Philippines
Becoming Tom Thomson		Steve Belford	Canada
Belle River		Guillaume Fournier, Samuel Matteau, Yannick Nolin	Canada
Benevolent		Jared Marino	Canada
The Benevolents	Les Bienveillants	Sarah Baril Gaudet	Canada
Best Wishes		Zhang Xiaoan	China
The Big Red Bastard		Thomas Horvath	United States
The Boy Who Couldn't Feel Pain		Eugen Merher	Germany
Braided Together		Victoria Anderson-Gardner, Kyle Schmalenberg	Canada
Bump		Maziyar Khatam	Canada
Darkside		Spencer Zimmerman	Canada
The Electricity in Me		Mat Sheldon	United Kingdom
Eye for an Eye	Oeil pour oeil	Anthony Coveney	Canada
Familiar Stranger	Il Nonno che non c'è	Sara Furrer, Fabian Lütolf	Switzerland
Fictions		Alice Charlie Liu	Canada
Fieldtrip		Soren Bendt, Paul Arion	United Kingdom
First Semester of Second Grade		Chengqing Zhu	China
Free Fall		Emmanuel Tenenbaum	France
French Enough	Assez French	Alexis Normand	Canada
Gina		Kathryn Prescott	United States
Grandmothers		Millefiore Clarkes	Canada
A Great Big Terrible Dream		Maxine Lemieux	Canada
Great Seeing You		Holly Pruner	Canada
In the Dark		Bronson Allen	Canada
An Invitation		Yeung Tung, Hao Zhao	China
A Jesuit		Angus McMaster	Canada
Killing Bagheera		Muschirf Shekh Zeyn	Syria
Little Bird		Tee Schneider	Canada
Living All of Life	Vivir todo la vida	Marlén Rios-Farjat	Mexico
Lockjaw	Tétanos	Alexandre Lefebvre	Canada
Menace		Joy Webster	Canada
Meneath: The Hidden Island of Ethics		Terril Calder	Canada
The Middle		Hannah Jovin, Adrian Morphy	Canada
Moonshine		Sarah Dunlavey	Canada
Mother of Invention		Holly Brace-Lavoie	Canada
More Than Hair	Plus que des cheveux	Fitch Jean	Canada
N'xaxaitkw		Asia Youngman	Canada
Nuisance Bear		Jack Weisman, Gabriela Osio Vanden	Canada
On Your Behalf		Ana Garcia Rico	United Kingdom
Open House		Tom Sidi	United States
Service	Palvelus	Mikko Makela	Finland
A Shore Away	L'Autre rive	Gaëlle Graton	Canada
Spiral	Kierre	Salla Sorri, Eva-Maria Koskinen	Finland
Tequila Sunset		Jinsul Song	United States
There Are No Children Here		Shehrezade Mian	Canada
What Flowers They Bloom		C. Hudson Hwang	Canada
When She Was Good		Margarita Milne	United Kingdom
Where the Grass Is Greener	Là où il fait bon vivre	Guillaume Massi-Hamel	Canada
White Rose	Rose blanche	Marilou Caravecchia-Pelletier	Canada
