= 2022 Vancouver International Film Festival =

2022 Canadian film festival

- Opening film: Bones of Crows by Marie Clements
- Closing film: Broker by Hirokazu Kore-eda
- Location: Vancouver, British Columbia, Canada
- Founded: 1958
- No. of films: 237
- Festival date: September 29 - October 9, 2022
- Website: VIFF

Vancouver International Film Festival
- 42nd 40th

The 2022 Vancouver International Film Festival, the 41st event in the history of the Vancouver International Film Festival, was held from September 29 to October 9, 2022. The festival opened with the Marie Clements film Bones of Crows, and closed with Hirokazu Kore-eda's film Broker.

The festival scheduled 135 feature films and 102 short films overall. All films were screened in-person, although a selection of films was also available throughout British Columbia on the online VIFF Connects platform.

The most noted change at the 2022 festival is the introduction of Vanguard, a competitive program for films by emerging directors. The festival will present a $5,000 award to the film selected as the best film in that program. Some of the festival's programs have also been renamed from past years, including the Canadian film program being renamed from True North to Northern Lights and the Music/Art/Design (M/A/D) program for documentary films about the arts being renamed to Portraits.

== Awards ==
Juried award winners were announced on October 7, 2022, with audience award winners announced following the conclusion of the festival.

Award	Film	Filmmaker
Audience Award, Galas & Special Presentations	The Grizzlie Truth	Kathleen Jayme
Audience Award, Showcase	Crystal Pite: Angels' Atlas	Chelsea McMullan
Audience Award, Panorama	The Blue Caftan	Maryam Touzani
Audience Award, Vanguard	Harvest Moon (Эргэж ирэхгүй намар)	Amarsaikhan Baljinnyam
Audience Award, Northern Lights	Riceboy Sleeps	Anthony Shim
Audience Award, Insights	The Klabona Keepers	Tamo Campos, Jasper Snow-Rosen
Audience Award, Spectrum	The Hermit of Treig	Lizzie MacKenzie
Audience Award, Portraits	Lay Down Your Heart	Marie Clements
Audience Award, Altered States	Rodeo	Lola Quivoron
Best Canadian Film	Riceboy Sleeps	Anthony Shim
Best Canadian Film, Honorable Mention	Queens of the Qing Dynasty	Ashley McKenzie
Best Canadian Documentary	Geographies of Solitude	Jacquelyn Mills
Best Canadian Documentary, Honorable Mention	Ever Deadly	Tanya Tagaq, Chelsea McMullan
Best Canadian Short Film	Baba	Meran Ismailsoy, Anya Chirkova
Best Canadian Short Film, Honorable Mentions	Agony	Armand Beaudoux
Best Canadian Short Film, Honorable Mentions	Heartbeat of a Nation	Eric Janvier
Emerging Canadian Director	Falcon Lake	Charlotte Le Bon
Emerging Canadian Director, Honorable Mention	Until Branches Bend	Sophie Jarvis
Best BC Film	Until Branches Bend	Sophie Jarvis
Best BC Film, Honorable Mention	The Klabona Keepers	Tamo Campos, Jasper Snow-Rosen
Vanguard Award	Other Cannibals (Altri Cannibali)	Francesco Sossai
Vanguard Award, Honorable Mention	Tortoise Under the Earth	Shishir Jha

== Films ==
=== Galas and special presentations ===
English title	Original title	Director(s)	Production country
The Banshees of Inisherin		Martin McDonagh	United Kingdom, Ireland, United States
Bones of Crows		Marie Clements	Canada
Broker	브로커	Hirokazu Kore-eda	South Korea
Corsage		Marie Kreutzer	Austria, France, Germany
Decision to Leave		Park Chan-wook	South Korea
Empire of Light		Sam Mendes	United Kingdom, United States
EO		Jerzy Skolimowski	Poland, Italy
The Grizzlie Truth		Kathleen Jayme	Canada
One Fine Morning	Un beau matin	Mia Hansen-Løve	France
The Son		Florian Zeller	United Kingdom
Stars at Noon		Claire Denis	France
Triangle of Sadness		Ruben Östlund	Sweden, United Kingdom, United States, France, Greece
The Whale		Darren Aronofsky	United States
Women Talking		Sarah Polley	United States

=== Showcase ===
English title	Original title	Director(s)	Production country
Alcarràs		Carla Simón	Spain, Italy
Before, Now & Then	Nana	Kamila Andini	Indonesia
Black Ice		Hubert Davis	Canada
Boy from Heaven		Tarik Saleh	Sweden
Brother		Clement Virgo	Canada
Call Jane		Phyllis Nagy	United States
Close		Lukas Dhont	Belgium, Netherlands, France
Crystal Pite: Angels' Atlas		Chelsea McMullan	Canada
Emily		Frances O'Connor	United Kingdom, United States
Holy Spider		Ali Abbasi	Denmark, Germany, Sweden, France
Klondike	Клондайк	Maryna Er Gorbach	Ukraine
Motherhood	Bosei / 母性	Ryūichi Hiroki	Japan
Nostalgia		Mario Martone	Italy, France
Pacifiction	Tourment sur les îles	Albert Serra	France, Spain, Germany, Portugal
Peter von Kant		François Ozon	France
R.M.N.		Cristian Mungiu	Romania, France
Tori and Lokita	Tori et Lokita	Jean-Pierre and Luc Dardenne	Belgium
Viking		Stéphane Lafleur	Canada

=== Panorama ===
English title	Original title	Director(s)	Production country
Aftersun		Charlotte Wells	United Kingdom, United States
The Beasts	As bestas	Rodrigo Sorogoyen	Spain, France
The Blue Caftan	Le Bleu du Caftan	Maryam Touzani	Morocco, France, Belgium, Denmark
Carajita		Silvina Schnicer, Ulises Porra Guardiola	Dominican Republic, Argentina
Dos estaciones		Juan Pablo González	Mexico, France, United States
Falcon Lake		Charlotte Le Bon	Canada, France
Field of Blood	Campo de Sangue	João Mário Grilo	Portugal
Fogaréu		Flávia Neves	Brazil, France
The Forger	Der Passfälscher	Maggie Peren	Germany, Luxembourg
Joyland		Saim Sadiq	Pakistan
Karaoke		Moshe Rosenthal	Israel
Leonora addio		Paolo Taviani	Italy
Like a Fish on the Moon	Balaye aseman zire ab	Dornaz Hajiha	Iran
Maigret		Patrice Leconte	France
A Matter of Trust	Ingen kender dagen	Annette K. Olesen	Denmark
Mediterranean Fever		Maha Haj	Palestine, Germany, France, Cyprus, Qatar
The Mountain	La Montagne	Thomas Salvador	France
Nanny		Nikyatu Jusu	United States
Nayola		José Miguel Ribeiro	Portugal, Belgium, France, Netherlands
No Prior Appointment	Bedoun-e Gharar-e Ghabli	Behrooz Shoaibi	Iran
The Novelist's Film	소설가의 영화, Soseolgaui Yeonghwa	Hong Sang-soo	South Korea
Once Upon a Time in Calcutta		Aditya Vikram Sengupta	India, France, Norway
Piaffe		Ann Oren	Germany
A Piece of Sky	Drii Winter	Michael Koch	Switzerland
Plan 75		Chie Hayakawa	Japan
Queens of the Qing Dynasty		Ashley McKenzie	Canada
Rabiye Kurnaz vs. George W. Bush	Rabiye Kurnaz gegen George W. Bush	Andreas Dresen	Germany, France
Riverside Mukolitta	川っぺりムコリッタ, Kawapperi Mukoritta	Naoko Ogigami	Japan
Scarlet	L’Envol	Pietro Marcello	France, Italy, Germany
Septet: The Story of Hong Kong	七人樂隊	Ann Hui, Sammo Hung, Ringo Lam, Patrick Tam, Johnnie To, Hark Tsui, Yuen Woo-ping	Hong Kong, China
Stonewalling	石門	Huang Ji, Otsuka Ryuji	Japan
There There		Andrew Bujalski	United States
Thunder	Foudre	Carmen Jaquier	Switzerland
Utama		Alejandro Loayza Grisi	Bolivia, Uruguay, France
We Are Family	出租家人	Benny Lau	Hong Kong
What We Do Next		Stephen Belber	United States
A Woman Escapes		Sofia Bohdanowicz, Burak Çevik, Blake Williams	Canada, Turkey
The Word	Slovo	Beata Parkanová	Czech Republic, Slovakia, Poland
Zátopek		David Ondříček	Czech Republic, Slovakia

=== Vanguard ===
English title	Original title	Director(s)	Production country
Harvest Moon	Эргэж ирэхгүй намар	Amarsaikhan Baljinnyam	Mongolia
Know Your Place		Zia Mohajerjasbi	United States
The Locust		Faeze Azizkhani	Iran, Germany
Moja Vesna		Sara Kern	Australia, Slovenia
Nightsiren	Světlonoc	Tereza Nvotová	Slovakia, Czech Republic
Other Cannibals	Altri Cannibali	Francesco Sossai	Germany
Tortoise Under the Earth		Shishir Jha	India
The Uncle	Stric	David Kapac, Andrija Mardešić	Croatia, Serbia

=== Northern Lights ===
English title	Original title	Director(s)	Production country
Anyox		Jessica Johnson, Ryan Ermacora	Canada
Back Home		Nisha Platzer	Canada
Concrete Valley		Antoine Bourges	Canada
Golden Delicious		Jason Karman	Canada
The Maiden		Graham Foy	Canada
North of Normal		Carly Stone	Canada
Riceboy Sleeps		Anthony Shim	Canada
Rosie		Gail Maurice	Canada
Soft		Joseph Amenta	Canada
Something You Said Last Night		Luis De Filippis	Canada
This House	Cette maison	Miryam Charles	Canada
Until Branches Bend		Sophie Jarvis	Canada
When Time Got Louder		Connie Cocchia	Canada
You Can Live Forever		Sarah Watts, Mark Slutsky	Canada

=== Insights ===
English title	Original title	Director(s)	Production country
1341 Frames of Love and War		Ran Tal	Israel, United Kingdom, United States
Adam Ondra: Pushing the Limits		Jan Šimánek, Petr Záruba	Czech Republic, Italy
All That Breathes		Shaunak Sen	India, United States, United Kingdom
A Fire Inside		Justin Krook, Luke Mazzaferro	Australia
Framing Agnes		Chase Joynt	Canada
Good Night Oppy		Ryan White	United States
If You Are a Man		Simon Panay	France, Burkina Faso
The Killing of a Journalist		Matt Sarnecki	Denmark
The Klabona Keepers		Tamo Campos, Jasper Snow-Rosen, Rhoda Quock	Canada
Last Flight Home		Ondi Timoner	United States
Love Will Come Later		Julia Furer	Switzerland
My Imaginary Country	Mi país imaginario	Patricio Guzmán	Chile, France
Rebellion		Elena Sánchez Bellot and Maia Kenworthy	United Kingdom
Retrograde		Matthew Heineman	United States
Unarchived		Hayley Gray, Elad Tzadok	Canada

=== Spectrum ===
English title	Original title	Director(s)	Production country
8 Stories About My Hearing Loss		Charo Mato	Argentina, Uruguay
Day After...	Anyadin...	Kamar Ahmad Simon	Bangladesh, France, Norway
De Humani Corporis Fabrica		Véréna Paravel, Lucien Castaing-Taylor	France, Switzerland
The Eclipse	Formorkelsen / Pomračenje	Nataša Urban	Norway, Serbia
Geographies of Solitude		Jacquelyn Mills	Canada
The Hermit of Treig		Lizzie MacKenzie	United Kingdom
Riotsville, U.S.A.		Sierra Pettengill	United States
See You Friday, Robinson	À vendredi, Robinson	Mitra Farahani	France, Switzerland, Iran, Lebanon

=== Portraits ===
English title	Original title	Director(s)	Production country
Cesária Évora		Ana Sofia Fonseca	Portugal
Dancing Pina		Florian Heinzen-Ziob	Germany
Ever Deadly		Chelsea McMullan, Tanya Tagaq	Canada
Goya, Carrière and the Ghost of Buñuel		José Luis López-Linares	France, Spain, Portugal
Hopper: An American Love Story		Phil Grabsky	United Kingdom, United States
The King of Wuxia		Lin Jing-jie	Taiwan
Lay Down Your Heart		Marie Clements	Canada
The Melt Goes On Forever: The Art and Times of David Hammons		Judd Tully, Harold Crooks	Canada, United States
Music Pictures: New Orleans		Ben Chace	United States
Okay!: The ASD Band Film		Mark Bone	Canada
Soviet Bus Stops		Kristoffer Hegnsvad	Denmark, Canada, United Kingdom, Sweden, Latvia

=== Altered States ===
English title	Original title	Director(s)	Production country
Blaze		Del Kathryn Barton	Australia
Huesera: The Bone Woman		Michelle Garza Cervera	Mexico
Leonor Will Never Die		Martika Ramirez Escobar	Philippines
Quantum Cowboys		Geoff Marslett	United States
Rodeo	Rodéo	Lola Quivoron	France
Sick of Myself		Kristoffer Borgli	Norway, Sweden
Smoking Causes Coughing	Fumer fait tousser	Quentin Dupieux	France
Something in the Dirt		Justin Benson, Aaron Moorhead	United States

=== Short Forum ===
English title	Original title	Director(s)	Production country
Adore		Beth Warrian	Canada
Agony	Agonie	Arnaud Beaudoux	Canada
Baba		Anya Chirkova, Meran Ismailsoy	Canada
The Ballad of Gus		Brian Barnhart	Canada
Blond Night	Nuit blonde	Gabrielle Demers	Canada
Brasier		Émilie Mannering	Canada
Chasing Birds		Una Lorenzen	Canada
Coin Slot		Scott Jones	Canada
Dhulpa		Kunsang Kyirong	Canada
The Faraway Place		Kenny Welsh	Canada
First Months of Freedom		Kriss Li	Canada
The Flying Sailor	Le Matelot volant	Wendy Tilby and Amanda Forbis	Canada
Framing the Self		Andrea Cristini	Canada
From Chile to Canada: Media Herstories		Sarah Shamash, Sonia Medel	Canada
Grown in Darkness		Devin Shears	Canada
Heartbeat of a Nation		Eric Janvier	Canada
Hills and Mountains		Salar Pashtoonyar	Canada
Horse Brothers		Milos Mitrovic, Fabian Velasco	Canada
I Empower as a Mother		Dani Barker, Inder Nirwan	Canada
I See Me Watching		Sidney Gordon	Canada
I, Sun	Moi soleil	Julien Falardeau	Canada
I Thought the World of You		Kurt Walker	Canada
Late Summer		Ryan Steel	Canada
Mariposa		John Greyson, Bongani Ndodana-Breen	Canada
Meeting with Robert Dole	Rencontre avec Robert Dole	François Harvey	Canada
Minus Twenty		Jack Parker	Canada
Mother's Skin		Leah Johnston	Canada
Municipal Relaxation Module		Matthew Rankin	Canada
My Thoughts Exactly		Mike Archibald	Canada
Nanitic		Carol Nguyen	Canada
N’xaxaitkw		Asia Youngman	Canada
Paco		Kent Donguines	Canada
The Passing		Jackson Harvey	Canada
Patty vs. Patty		Chris Strikes	Canada
La Plage aux êtres		Kendra McLaughlin	Canada
Pro Pool	Piscine pro	Alec Pronovost	Canada
Red House		Barry Doupé	Canada
Reste		Ginger Le Pêcheur	Canada
Rocket Fuel		Jessie Posthumus	Canada
Rose		Roxann Whitebean	Canada
Rumination		Ashleigh Vaillancourt	Canada
The Runner		Amar Chebib	Canada
Scaring Women at Night		Karimah Zakia Issa	Canada
Sexy Highland Stream		Nathan Adler	Canada
Sikiitu		Gabriel Allard Gagnon	Canada
Square Peg		Christian Bunea	Canada
Terror/Forming		Rylan Friday	Canada
Tibi		Jarret Twoyoungmen	Canada
Tidal		Chloe Van Landschoot	Canada
Tongue		Kaho Yoshida	Canada

=== International Shorts ===
English title	Original title	Director(s)	Production country
Baby	Bebé	Cristina Sánchez Salamanca	Colombia
Before Birth	Antes de nacer	Carmen Jiménez, Álex Mena	Spain
Bye Bye	Partir un jour	Amélie Bonnin	France
Censor of Dreams		Léo Berne, Raphaël Rodriguez	France
The Ceremony		Lisle Turner	United Kingdom
The Cormorant	Le Cormoran	Lubna Playoust	France
A Different Place		Sophie Black	United Kingdom
Ellie		Fernando Bonelli	Spain
Empire of My Melodious Mind		Jeannette Louie	United States
Firecracker Bullets		Chad Charlie	United States
For Real	Na Serio	Ernest Lorek	Poland
For You Today the Light of the Sun Will Not Shine	Per Voi Oggi la Luce del sole non splenderà	Andrea Bordoli	Switzerland
Further and Further Away	Chhngai Dach Alai	Polen Ly	Cambodia
Island of Freedom	Ostrov svobody	Petr Januschka	Czech Republic
Judy, Judy, Judy		Jessica McGaugh	United States
Killing Ourselves		Maya Yadlin	Israel
The Lone Wolf	O lobo solitário	Filipe Melo	Portugal
Magnified City		Isaku Kaneko	Japan
Marianne		Julien Gaspar-Oliveri	France
A Moral Man		Paul Wade, Simon Wade	United Kingdom
Mumu		Mo Sha	China
My Name Is Anti		Andreas Vakalios, Fili Olsefski	Greece
Nest		James Hunter	Australia
OST		Abhichoke Chandrasen	Thailand
Perspective		Alaa Algburi	Iraq, Jordan
Plastic Killer		Jose Pozo	Andorra, Spain
Ponto Final		Miguel López Beraza	Spain, Portugal
The Silent Ones	Les Silencieux	Basile Vuillemin	France, Belgium, Switzerland
Solar Eclipse	Eclipse	Raha Amirfazli, Alireza Ghasemi	France, Iran
Starfuckers		Antonio Marziale	United States
Will You Look at Me	Dang wo wang xiang ni de shi hou	Shuli Huang	China

=== Reel Youth ===
English title	Original title	Director(s)	Production country
CITSALP		Jean A. Evangelista	Philippines
Dear Karen		Mika Washington, Kaniel Jacob-Cross	Canada
Fireworks		Nicolas Leclerc	Canada
Fishing		Andreas Duerr	Germany
For My Father		Waka Wikaire James	New Zealand
The Hill We Climb		Wide Angle Youth Media	United States
Lonely Souls		Finn Morgan-Roberts	United Kingdom
Not Quite Quarantine		Julian Lee	United States
Paper Talk	A l'unisson	Nathalie Dunselman	France
Patterns in Our Lives		Leili Hamidi	Canada
Power		Hannah Gallant, Madison Jules George, Nona Marchand, Danielle Taralson	Canada
Prom and Potions	Baile da Magia	Ana Maria Teixeira Hora	Brazil
Self		Gagan Kumar C	India
She Said, She Said		Fraser Hannay	Canada
Solitude		Fiyin Coker	Canada
Sound of Borders		Bahar Rezvanifar	Iran
Through		Gaukhar Akzhol	Kazakhstan
Trailblazer		Jenna Hammerlindl, Heather Addison	Canada
Whisperer	Pasapalabra	Andrea Testini	Spain
The White Rose		Ian Kim	United States

=== Modes ===
English title	Original title	Director(s)	Production country
Backflip		Nikita Diakur	Germany, France
The Earth Will Swallow It All	Ziemia wchłonie to wszystko	Dominik Ritszel	Poland
The Fruit Tree		Isabelle Tollenaere	Belgium
Hardly Working		Susanna Flock, Robin Klengel, Leonhard Müllner, Michael Stumpf	Austria
Intermission		Réka Bucsi	Hungary
It's Raining Frogs Outside	Ampangabagat Nin Talakba Ha Likol	Maria Estela Paiso	Philippines
Laika		Deborah Stratman	United States
Lake of Fire		Neozoon	Germany
Neighbour Abdi		Douwe Dijkstra	Netherlands
Parasite Family		Prapat Jiwarangsan	Thailand
Perforated Realities		Gustaf Broms	Sweden
Prelude Op. 28 No. 2	Preludi Op. 28 nro 2	Jenni Toikka	Finland
Saving Some Random Insignificant Stories		Anna Vasof	Austria, Greece
The Stopover	L'Escale	Paul Shemisi, Nizar Saleh, Anne Reijniers, Rob Jacobs	Belgium, Democratic Republic of the Congo
Very, Very Tremendously	非常，非常，非常地	Guangli Liu	China, France
Watch the Fire or Burn Inside It	Il faut regarder le feu ou brûler dedans	Caroline Poggi, Jonathan Vinel	France
Woman as Image, Man as Bearer of the Look	La mujer como imagen, el hombre como portador de la mirada	Carlos Velandia	Colombia
Zoon		Jonatan Schwenk	Germany
