= Vancouver Film Critics Circle Awards 2022 =

Annual Canadian film awards ceremony

23rd VFCC Awards

February 13, 2023

Best International Picture:
Everything Everywhere All at Once

Best Canadian Picture:
I Like Movies

The 23rd Vancouver Film Critics Circle Awards were presented on February 13, 2023, to honour the films selected by the Vancouver Film Critics Circle as the best of 2022.

The nominations were announced on January 22, 2023, with The Banshees of Inisherin and Everything Everywhere All at Once leading the International film nominations with seven each. Riceboy Sleeps received the most Canadian film nominations with nine, followed by Until Branches Bend with six and Brother with five.

== Winners and nominees ==
=== International ===
Category	Winners and nominees	Films	Ref.
Best Picture	Daniel Kwan and Daniel Sceinert	Everything Everywhere All at Once	
Best Picture	Todd Field	Tár	
Best Picture	Martin McDonagh	The Banshees of Inisherin	
Best Director	Daniel Kwan and Daniel Sceinert	Everything Everywhere All at Once	
Best Director	Todd Field	Tár	
Best Director	Martin McDonagh	The Banshees of Inisherin	
Best Male Actor	Colin Farrell	The Banshees of Inisherin	
Best Male Actor	Austin Butler	Elvis	
Best Male Actor	Paul Mescal	Aftersun	
Best Female Actor	Michelle Yeoh	Everything Everywhere All at Once	
Best Female Actor	Cate Blanchett	Tár	
Best Female Actor	Janelle Monáe	Glass Onion: A Knives Out Mystery	
Best Supporting Male Actor	Brendan Gleeson	The Banshees of Inisherin	
Best Supporting Male Actor	Barry Keoghan	The Banshees of Inisherin	
Best Supporting Male Actor	Ke Huy Quan	Everything Everywhere All at Once	
Best Supporting Female Actor	Jessie Buckley	Women Talking	
Best Supporting Female Actor	Kerry Condon	The Banshees of Inisherin	
Best Supporting Female Actor	Frankie Corio	Aftersun	
Best Supporting Female Actor	Jamie Lee Curtis	Everything Everywhere All at Once	
Best Supporting Female Actor	Dolly de Leon	Triangle of Sadness	
Best Supporting Female Actor	Stephanie Hsu	Everything Everywhere All at Once	
Best Supporting Female Actor	Michelle Williams	The Fabelmans	
Best Screenplay	Martin McDonagh	The Banshees of Inisherin	
Best Screenplay	Todd Field	Tár	
Best Screenplay	Daniel Kwan and Daniel Scheinert	Everything Everywhere All at Once	
Best Documentary	Laura Poitras	All the Beauty and the Bloodshed	
Best Documentary	Sara Dosa	Fire of Love	
Best Documentary	Brett Morgen	Moonage Daydream	
Best Foreign Language Film	Edward Berger	All Quiet on the Western Front	
Best Foreign Language Film	Ali Abbasi	Holy Spider	
Best Foreign Language Film	S. S. Rajamouli	RRR	

=== Canadian ===
Category	Winners and nominees	Films	Ref.
Best Picture	Chandler Levack	I Like Movies	
Best Picture	Jason Loftus	Eternal Spring	
Best Picture	Anthony Shim	Riceboy Sleeps	
Best British Columbia Film	Anthony Shim	Riceboy Sleeps	
Best British Columbia Film	Teresa Alfeld	Doug and the Slugs and Me	
Best British Columbia Film	Sophie Jarvis	Until Branches Bend	
Best Director	Sarah Polley	Women Talking	
Best Director	Jason Loftus	Eternal Spring	
Best Director	Anthony Shim	Riceboy Sleeps	
Best Director	Clement Virgo	Brother	
Best British Columbia Director	Anthony Shim	Riceboy Sleeps	
Best British Columbia Director	Teresa Alfeld	Doug and the Slugs and Me	
Best British Columbia Director	Sophie Jarvis	Until Branches Bend	
Best Male Actor	Isaiah Lehtinen	I Like Movies	
Best Male Actor	Adam Beach	Exile	
Best Male Actor	Lamar Johnson	Brother	
Best Female Actor	Choi Seung-yoon	Riceboy Sleeps	
Best Female Actor	Grace Glowicki	Until Branches Bend	
Best Female Actor	Hayley Law	Door Mouse	
Best Supporting Male Actor	Percy Hynes White	I Like Movies	
Best Supporting Male Actor	Dohyun Noel Hwang	Riceboy Sleeps	
Best Supporting Male Actor	Aaron Pierre	Brother	
Best Supporting Female Actor	Judith Ivey	Women Talking	
Best Supporting Female Actor	Marsha Stephanie Blake	Brother	
Best Supporting Female Actor	Alexandra Roberts	Until Branches Bend	
Best Supporting Female Actor	Camille Sullivan	Exile	
Best Screenplay	Chandler Levack	I Like Movies	
Best Screenplay	Anthony Shim	Riceboy Sleeps	
Best Screenplay	Clement Virgo	Brother	
Best Documentary	Jason Loftus	Eternal Spring	
Best Documentary	Hubert Davis	Black Ice	
Best Documentary	Jeremiah Hayes	Dear Audrey	
One to Watch	Anthony Shim	Riceboy Sleeps	
One to Watch	Grace Glowicki	Until Branches Bend	
One to Watch	Dohyun Noel Hwang	Riceboy Sleeps	
One to Watch	Sophie Jarvis	Until Branches Bend	
