= Christopher Lew =

Christopher Lew may refer to:

- Christopher Y. Lew, American art curator and writer
- Christopher Lew (cinematographer), Canadian cinematographer
