= Cea Sunrise Person =

Canadian model and writer (born 1969)

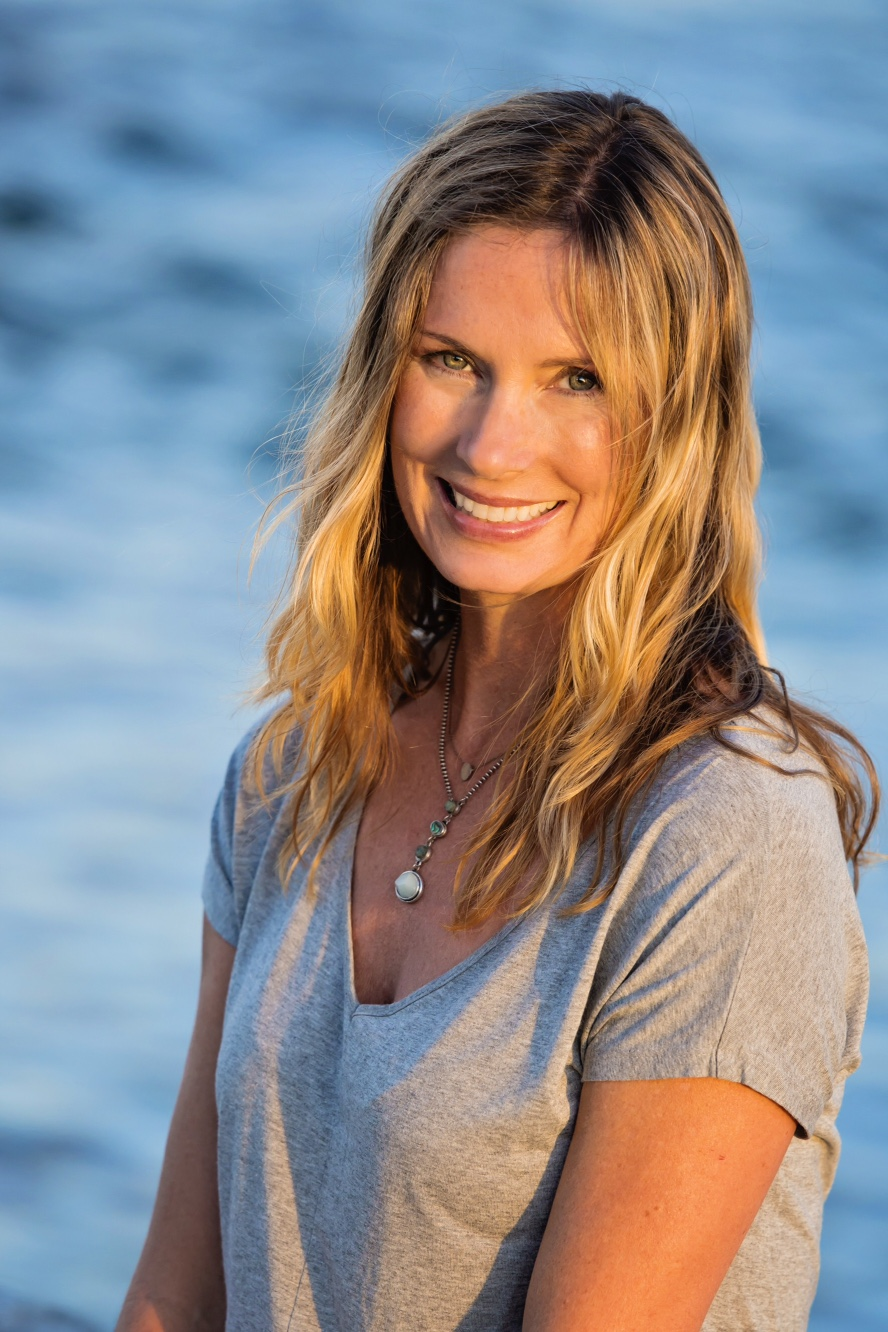
- Born: November 30, 1969 (age 56); Hills, British Columbia
- Occupations: Writer; Model
- Spouse(s): ?? (m. ??)
- Children: 3
- Writing career
- Genre: non-fiction
- Notable work: North of Normal
- Website: www.ceaperson.com

Cea Sunrise Person (born 1969) is a writer and former model best known as the author of North of Normal, a 2014 memoir detailing her rustic upbringing in the wilderness of Alberta, British Columbia, and the Yukon. She lives in Vancouver, British Columbia, Canada.

== Early life ==
Prior to her birth, Person's grandfather moved the family around to locations in Minnesota, Missouri, Montana, Washington, Wyoming, and California. Person's mother, Michelle, became pregnant with her at 15 years of age while living in California. The family moved again to Hills, British Columbia, and Person was born in the nearby town of New Denver in November 1969.

Person grew up largely in the central Alberta and Yukon wilderness with her mother, grandparents, and aunts. Members of her family adhered to a hippie lifestyle, living off the land in makeshift tipis with other individuals and passersby. The family often hunted and foraged for food. Person recalls witnessing drug use, sexual acts, and open nudity as young as age 4. Person felt ostracized from her peers at a young age because of her unusual upbringing. She entered a modeling competition at age 13 and left to pursue her career in New York City.

== Modeling career and later life ==
By age 15, Person was working as a high-fashion model in Manhattan and Paris and was also posing for photo shoots in Mauritius. In her early–to-late 20s, she lived in Europe and worked as a catalogue model. At the age of 29, she retired from full-time modeling. She then moved to Vancouver where she started a swimwear company.

In 2007, she began writing her memoir, North of Normal, about her upbringing in the wilderness. The book details her early life prior to moving to Calgary and then starting her modelling career. The book underwent numerous revisions over 6 years before it was published by HarperCollins in 2014. She published a second memoir in 2017, Nearly Normal, that details more of her experiences during her early and adult life. She lives in Vancouver and is married with three children.

North of Normal, a feature film adaptation by Carly Stone of Person's book, premiered at the 2022 Toronto International Film Festival.

== Works ==
- Person, Cea Sunrise (2014). North of Normal: A Memoir of My Wilderness Childhood, My Counterculture Family and How I Survived Both. Toronto: HarperCollins. ISBN 978-1-44342-437-0.
- Person, Cea Sunrise (2017). Nearly Normal: Surviving the Wilderness, My Family and Myself. Toronto: HarperCollins. ISBN 978-1-44344-904-5.
