= 2022 British Academy Scotland Awards =

- Date: 20 November 2022
- Site: Glasgow, Scotland
- Hosted by: Edith Bowman

The 2022 British Academy Scotland Awards were held on 20 November 2022 in Glasgow, Scotland.

== Nominees ==
The nominations were announced on 12 October and the winners were announced on 20 November. Winners are listed first and highlighted in boldface.

Best Actor in Film	Best Actress in Film
**Jack Lowden – Benediction**: Mark Bonnar – Operation Mincemeat; Peter Capaldi – Benediction	**Izuka Hoyle – Boiling Point**: Marli Siu – Our Ladies; Tilda Swinton – The Souvenir Part II
Best Actor in Television	Best Actress in Television
**Dougray Scott – Crime**: Jack Docherty – Scot Squad Hogmanay Special; Ncuti Gatwa – Sex Education	**Phyllis Logan – Guilt**: Caitríona Balfe – Outlander; Suranne Jones – Vigil
Best Director (Factual)	Best Director (Fiction)
**Matt Pinder – The Hunt For Bible John**: Jack Cocker – Runrig: There Must Be A Place; John MacLaverty – The Mystery Of Anthrax Island	**James Strong – Vigil**: Max Myers – Shetland; Isabelle Sieb – Vigil
Best Entertainment	Best Factual Series
**Biffy Clyro: A Celebration of Endings – Oscar Sansom, Simon Neil, Beth Allan – Forest of Black/BBC Four**: The Brilliant World of Tom Gates – Production Team - TG Entertainment Ltd., Wild Child Animation, Black Camel Productions/Sky Kids; Richard Osman's House of Games – Tamara Gilder, Breid McLoone, Sarah Boyce, John Smith - Remarkable Television/BBC Two	**Darren McGarvey's Addictions – Harry Bell, Emma Fentiman, Jack Cocker, Sileas MacInnes - Tern Television Productions/BBC Scotland**: Rescue: Extreme Medics – Production Team – Firecrest Films/Channel 4; Scotland's Sacred Island With Ben Fogle – Harry Bell, Craig Collinson, Ceara East, Clyde Wallbanks – Tern Television Productions/BBC Scotland
Best Feature Film	Best Features
**Dying to Divorce – Sinead Kirwan, Chloë Fairweather, Andrea Cuadrado, Paul Dosaj**: Our Ladies – Brian Coffey, Michael Caton-Jones, Laura Viederman; Rebel Dykes – Production Team	**Miriam and Alan: Lost In Scotland – Production Team – Blink Films/Channel 4**: A Country Life For Half The Price With Katie Humble – Production Team – Raise the Roof Productions/Channel 5; Extraordinary Escapes With Sandi Toksvig – Sandi Toksvig, Steph Harris, Julie Grant, Ed St Giles – Tuesday’s Child Scotland/Channel 4
Best Game	Best News & Current Affairs
**Hercule Poirot: The First Cases – Development Team – Blazing Griffin**: The Longest Walk – Alexander Tarvet; Strange Sickness – William Hepburn, Jackson Armstrong, Katharine Neil, Alana Bell –Common Profyt Games Ltd	**The Truth About Nike & Adidas (Dispatches) – Production Team – Firecrest Films/Channel 4**: Dirty Business (Disclosure) – Production Team – BBC Scotland; The Truth About Brewdog (Disclosure) – Kevin Anderson, Mark Daly, Myles Bonnar, Shelley Jofre – BBC Scotland
Best Short Film & Animation	Best Single Documentary
**Too Rough – Production Team**: The Bayview – Daniel Cook, Marcy Paterson; Groom – Leyla Josephine Coll-O'Reilly, Laura McBride, Lorena Pages, Jack Goessens	**The Hermit of Treig – Production Team – Aruna Productions/BBC Scotland**: Being Mum With MND – Production Team – Lion Television Scotland/BBC Scotland; Scotland The Rave – Graeme Armstrong, Liam McArdle, Carlin Wallace, Pauline Law – IWC Media/BBC Scotland
Best Specialist Factual	Best Television Scripted
**The Hunt For Bible John – Matt Pinder, Audrey McColligan, Paul McGinness, Iain Scollay – Firecrest Films/BBC Scotland**: Battle For The Black Swan (Drain The Oceans) – Production Team – Mallinson Sadler Productions/National Geographic; Dolly: The Sheep That Changed The World – Harry Bell, Graeme Hart, Gary Scott, Katie Chapman – Tern Television Productions/BBC Scotland	**Guilt – Production Team – Expectation, Happy Tramp/BBC Scotland**: Screw – Rob Williams, Tom Vaughan, Sarah Brown, Brian Kaczynski – STV Studios/Channel 4; Vigil – Production Team – World Productions/BBC One
Best Writer Film/Television in partnership with Screen Scotland	Audience Award in partnership with Screen Scotland
**Neil Forsyth – Guilt**: Tom Edge – Vigil; Stephen Greenhorn – Around the World in 80 Days	**Sam Heughan – Outlander**: Yong-Chin Breslin – Glow Up: Britain's Next Make-Up Star; Brian Cox – Succession; Ncuti Gatwa – Sex Education; Hazel Irvine – Tokyo 2020 Olympics; Richard Rankin – Outlander

=== Outstanding Contribution to Film & Television ===
- Peter Capaldi
