= We Are Northern Lights =

- Directed by: Nick Higgins
- Produced by: Nick Higgins
- Edited by: Colin Monie
- Music by: Blair Mowat
- Release dates: 16 February 2013 (Glasgow Film Festival); 23 February 2013 (Scotland)
- Running time: 98 minutes
- Country: United Kingdom
- Languages: English; Gaelic
- Budget: £250,000

We Are Northern Lights is a 2013 Scottish documentary film about the Scottish people, which was screened around Scotland. According to the BBC it was created using footage taken by over 100 members of the Scottish public during 2012. It is described as Scotland's first ever crowd sourced film project. It was shown at the Glasgow Film Festival in 2013 before being distributed to 5 Scottish Cineworld cinemas. It was also chosen as the opening film for the 2013 Glasgow Southside Film Festival.
