= Rebecca Steele (producer) =

Canadian film and television producer

Rebecca Steele is a Canadian film and television producer. She is most noted as a producer of the film Riceboy Sleeps, which was a Canadian Screen Award nominee for Best Motion Picture at the 11th Canadian Screen Awards in 2023.

The founder of Kind Stranger Productions, she previously produced the web series The Happiest People in New York, the short films Taking a Piss, Ecstasy & Agony and The Quieting, and the theatrical feature film Daughter. She was the director of Ecstasy & Agony, and a writer, director and cast member of The Happiest People in New York.
