= Glasgow Film Festival =

Annual film festival in Glasgow, Scotland

- Location: Glasgow, Scotland
- Founded: 2005
- Awards: Audience Award
- Website: glasgowfilmfest.org

The Glasgow Film Festival (GFF) is an annual film festival based in Glasgow, Scotland. Established in 2005, it is considered one of the top film festivals in the United Kingdom and draws over 40,000 attendees each year.

== Overview ==
The Glasgow Film Festival was launched in 2005 and initially based in the Glasgow Film Theatre. The event focused on non-mainstream cinema and treated the audience as the main guests, quickly earning a title of one of the friendliest film festivals in the world. From less than 5,000 in 2005, attendance grew up to 40,000 in 2013. By 2015, the festival had already been considered one of the top three film festivals in the UK. As the festival grew and developed, it expanded to other venues; in 2017, special screenings were hosted by an indoor real snow ski slope.

The festival's main and only prize is the Audience Award, sponsored by MUBI. Another section is FrightFest, a selection of horror films programmed by the London-based horror film festival. The programme also includes the free morning retrospective screenings.

The festival has its industry section that provides networking opportunities and hosts various master-classes and events. For example, in 2024, it offered live animation project pitching session with a £5,000 funding prize.

Since 2006, the festival has been directed by Allison Gardner. In 2023, her long-time co-director Allan Hunter stepped down, succeeded by Chris Kumar.

== History ==
=== 2008 ===
In 2008, the festival took place between 14–24 February. The programme included exclusive premieres as well as a Bette Davis retrospective.

=== 2009 ===
The 2009 event featured an Audrey Hepburn retrospective and a birthday tribute to Errol Flynn.

=== 2010 ===
In 2010, the festival took place between 18–28 February. From over 800 submissions received by the organisers, 120 features were selected for the festival programme. The opening gala featured Jean-Pierre Jeunet's latest film, Micmacs with the director there to present the film. Other guests included Peter Mullan, James Earl Jones and the cast of Scottish classic, Gregory's Girl. Oscar nominated Crazy Heart was also shown, prior to the general release date. Also included a Cary Grant retrospective, as well as strands focusing on Japanese Cinema, Fashion and Music and film.

In 2010, a Margaret Tait award for experimental and innovative filmmaking was launched, coming with a £10,000 commission for the winner's next project.

=== 2011 ===
The 7th edition ran from 16 to 26 February 2012. It featured The Gene Kelly: Strictly Song and Dance retrospective, marking the centenary of his birth. More than 250 films were shown, including You Instead and The Eagle premieres.

=== 2012 ===
The 8th edition took place from 16 to 26 February, featuring 7 world and 21 UK premieres. The closing gala featured Le Havre, This Must Be the Place, The Kid with a Bike, etc. The FrightFest highlights included The Raid and The Day.

=== 2013 ===
The 2013 edition ran from 14-24 February, featuring 368 film screenings and 57 UK film premieres.

=== 2014 ===
With the festival lasting 11 days from February 18 to March 1, GFF 10th edition admission figures topped 40,000. The programme featured 60 UK premieres and seven world premieres. The festival's pop-up events were hosted at various locations throughout the city, including the Briggait and the Tall Ship. The 10th edition was so successful that the managers decided to add one more day for the next year.

=== 2015 ===
The 11th Glasgow Film Festival ran from 18 February to 1 March. 2015's festival featured 174 events, including 11 world premieres, 33 UK premieres and 65 Scottish premieres. The festival introduced its first award — The Audience Award, won by Tom Browne's Radiator. The attendance reached 35,000.

=== 2016 ===
In 2016, the festival took place 17-28 February. The edition featured 174 feature films, including 60 UK premieres. Admissions reached 42,000. The Audience Award was won by Deniz Gamze Ergüven's Mustang.

=== 2017 ===
The 13th edition took place from 15 to 26 February. In 2017, the festival attained over 40,000 admissions for the fourth consecutive year. Featuring 180 films from 38 countries with more than 65 UK premieres, programme highlights included Elle, I Am Not Your Negro, Free Fire and a screening of John Carpenter's The Thing on an indoor ski slope. Empire Magazine presented a special screening of The Lost Boys as a secret location. The Audience Award was won by Alankrita Shrivastava's Lipstick Under My Burkha.

=== 2018 ===
The 14th edition took place from 21 February to 4 March, 2018, with more than 300 premieres, screenings and events planned. However, the 2018 edition of the festival was nearly ruined by the British Isles cold wave. For several days, only the locals could attend the events.

=== 2020 ===
The 16th edition took place from 26 February to 8 March, 2020. The programme includes nine world premieres and 102 UK premieres. Film-opening Proxima by Alice Winocour.

=== 2023 ===
The 2023 edition was held from March 1 to 12. The 19th edition of the festival screened 123 features, including six world premieres, 16 European and international premieres and 70 UK premieres. The festival opened with Adura Onashile’s Glasgow-shot feature debut Girl, and closed with Nida Manzoor’s Polite Society.

=== 2024 ===
The 20th anniversary edition was held from 28 February to 10 March, 2024. This year's feature submissions exceeded 400. The line-up featured 11 world and international premieres, including İlker Çatak’s The Teachers’ Lounge, Agnieszka Holland’s Green Border, Giacomo Abbruzzese’s Disco Boy, and the opening film was Rose Glass's Love Lies Bleeding.

=== 2025 ===
The 21st edition was held from 6 February to 9 March 2025. The event featured 16 World and European premieres, 64 UK premieres, and 11 Scottish premieres hosted at the Glasgow Film Theatre and other venues across the city.

The Audience Award was won by Spilt Milk, directed by Brian Durnin.

=== 2026 ===
The festival took place from 25 February to 8 March 2026 in Glasgow for its 22nd edition. The event presented 126 films from 44 countries, including several world and UK premieres.

The festival opened with the documentary Everybody to Kenmure Street, directed by Felipe Bustos Sierra, and closed with the UK premiere of California Schemin’, the first feature film directed by Scottish actor James McAvoy.

The Audience Award was awarded to the French drama A Place For Her, directed by Mélisa Godet.

== Audience Award ==
In 2015, GFF introduced its only award, the Audience Award. Films eligible for the award are usually from first or second time directors and can be either fiction or documentary. The award is voted for by attendees with the winner announced at the closing gala of the festival.

Year	Film	Director	Ref.
2015	Radiator	Tom Browne	
2016	Mustang	Deniz Gamze Ergüven	
2017	Lipstick Under My Burkha	Alankrita Shrivastava	
2018	Custody	Xavier Legrand	
2019	Harry Birrell: Films of Love and War	Matt Pinder	
2020	Arracht	Tomás Ó Súilleabháin	
2021	Sweetheart	Marley Morrison	
2022	The Hermit of Treig	Lizzie MacKenzie	
2023	Riceboy Sleeps	Anthony Shim	
2024	The Home Game	Smári Gunnarsson and Logi Sigursveinsson	
2025	Spilt Milk	Brian Durnin	
2026	A Place For Her	Mélisa Godet	

== See also ==
- Culture in Glasgow
