= The Switch (2022 film) =

- French: La Switch
- Directed by: Michel Kandinsky
- Screenplay by: Michel Kandinsky; Christian Martel; Nadine Valcin
- Produced by: Tracy Legault
- Starring: François Arnaud; Lothaire Bluteau; Sophie Desmarais
- Cinematography: Stephen Chung; Duraid Munajim
- Edited by: Geoff Klein; Dev Singh
- Production companies: Carte Blanche Films; The OnOFF Company
- Distributed by: Filmoption
- Release date: September 18, 2022 (Cinéfest)
- Running time: 85 minutes
- Country: Canada
- Language: French

The Switch (French: La Switch) is a 2022 Canadian drama film, directed by Michel Kandinsky. The film stars François Arnaud as Cpl. Marc Leblanc, a soldier who returns home to Northern Ontario after serving in the War in Afghanistan, only to find his reintegration into civilian life complicated by his struggles with post-traumatic stress disorder.

The cast also includes Lothaire Bluteau, Sophie Desmarais, Joe Pingue, Maxwell McCabe-Lokos and Roch Castonguay.

The film was shot in Sudbury, Ontario, in fall 2020. It had its premiere at the 2022 Cinéfest Sudbury International Film Festival.
