= Riceboy Sleeps (film) =

- Film poster
- Directed by: Anthony Shim
- Written by: Anthony Shim
- Produced by: Bryan Demore; Anthony Shim; Rebecca Steele
- Starring: Choi Seung-yoon; Ethan Hwang; Hunter Dillon
- Cinematography: Christopher Lew
- Edited by: Anthony Shim
- Music by: Andrew Yong Hoon Lee
- Production companies: Lonesome Heroes Productions; Kind Stranger Productions; A Lasting Dose Productions
- Distributed by: Game Theory Films
- Release date: September 11, 2022 (TIFF)
- Running time: 117 minutes
- Country: Canada
- Languages: English; Korean

Riceboy Sleeps is a 2022 Canadian drama film, written, produced, edited, and directed by Anthony Shim. Based in part on Shim's own childhood, the film centres on So-Young (Choi Seung-yoon), a Korean immigrant single mother raising her teenage son Dong-Hyun (Ethan Hwang) after moving to Canada to give him a better life.

== Production ==
The film was shot in fall 2021, primarily in the Greater Vancouver Area with some location shooting in South Korea.

Shim shot the film primarily in long takes, avoiding the practice of shooting camera coverage or editing the scenes.

== Release ==
The film premiered in the Platform Prize program at the 2022 Toronto International Film Festival on September 11, 2022, and was named the winner of the program's award on September 18. It had its international premiere at the 27th Busan International Film Festival in October 2022.

The film was released in Canada on March 17, 2023, before expanding to more theaters in the following weeks. It released in South Korea on April 19, 2023.

In the US, the film was released direct-to-video on May 2, 2023.

== Critical response ==
On the review aggregator website Rotten Tomatoes, 97% of 29 critics' reviews are positive, with an average rating of 8/10. The website's consensus reads: "An emotionally impactful portrait of familial love, Riceboy Sleeps sees writer-director Anthony Shim reaffirming that the most personal stories are often the most universal."

Allan Hunter of Screen Daily wrote that the film "could almost be a companion piece to Lee Isaac Chung's Minari", and wrote that Shim "displays a sensitivity to the characters and the situations in which they find themselves. He never judges, and Christopher Lew’s gently roving camerawork and single takes invite the viewer to lean in, observe and take stock of all the emotions at play. The changing aspect ratios (Canadian sequences are shot in 4:3) also reflect the confinement and openness of the different countries. And he is well served by his cast, with an impressive So-young capturing the determination and fortitude of a character who puts everything into giving her son a new and better life."

The film was named to TIFF's annual year-end Canada's Top Ten list for 2022.

== Awards ==
Award	Date of ceremony	Category	Recipient(s)	Result	Ref.
Busan International Film Festival	October 14, 2022	Flash Forward Audience Award	Riceboy Sleeps	Won	
Cinefest Sudbury International Film Festival	September 25, 2022	Outstanding Canadian Film	Riceboy Sleeps	Won	
Directors Guild of Canada	November 7, 2022	Jean-Marc Vallée DGC Discovery Award	Riceboy Sleeps	Won	
Toronto International Film Festival	September 18, 2022	Platform Prize	Riceboy Sleeps	Won	
Vancouver International Film Festival	October 7, 2022	Best Canadian Film	Riceboy Sleeps	Won	
Vancouver International Film Festival	October 19, 2022	Audience Award, Northern Lights	Riceboy Sleeps	Won	
Windsor International Film Festival	November 1, 2022	WIFF Prize in Canadian Film	Riceboy Sleeps	Won	
Palm Springs International Film Festival	January 16, 2023	New Voices New Visions Award	Riceboy Sleeps	Nominated	
Palm Springs International Film Festival	January 16, 2023	Young Cineasted Award	Riceboy Sleeps	Won	
Toronto Film Critics Association	March 8, 2023	Rogers Best Canadian Film Award	Riceboy Sleeps	Won	
Vancouver Film Critics Circle	February 13, 2023	Best Canadian Film	Riceboy Sleeps	Nominated	
Vancouver Film Critics Circle	February 13, 2023	Best British Columbia Film	Riceboy Sleeps	Won	
Vancouver Film Critics Circle	February 13, 2023	Best Director of a Canadian Film	Anthony Shim	Nominated	
Vancouver Film Critics Circle	February 13, 2023	Best British Columbia Director	Anthony Shim	Won	
Vancouver Film Critics Circle	February 13, 2023	Best Screenplay for a Canadian Film	Anthony Shim	Nominated	
Vancouver Film Critics Circle	February 13, 2023	Best Actress in a Canadian Film	Choi Seung-yoon	Won	
Vancouver Film Critics Circle	February 13, 2023	Best Supporting Actor in a Canadian Film	Dohyun Noel Hwang	Nominated	
Vancouver Film Critics Circle	February 13, 2023	One to Watch	Dohyun Noel Hwang	Nominated	
Vancouver Film Critics Circle	February 13, 2023	One to Watch	Anthony Shim	Won	
Glasgow Film Festival	March 13, 2023	Audience Award	Anthony Shim	Won	
Canadian Screen Awards	April 16, 2023	Best Motion Picture	Anthony Shim, Rebecca Steele, Bryan Demore	Nominated	
Canadian Screen Awards	April 16, 2023	Best Director	Anthony Shim	Nominated	
Canadian Screen Awards	April 16, 2023	Best Lead Performance in a Film	Choi Seung-yoon	Nominated	
Canadian Screen Awards	April 16, 2023	Best Original Screenplay	Anthony Shim	Won	
Canadian Screen Awards	April 16, 2023	Best Cinematography	Christopher Lew	Nominated	
Canadian Screen Awards	April 16, 2023	Best Editing	Anthony Shim	Nominated	
Asia Pacific Screen Awards	November 3, 2023	Best Screenplay	Anthony Shim	Won	
