= Vampire High =

- DVD cover
- Created by: Garry Blye; Mark Shekter
- Starring: Jeff Roop; Meghan Ory; Ilona Elkin; Joris Jarsky; Karen Cliche; Paul Hopkins; Adam MacDonald; Marianne Farley; Jodie Resther; Patrick Thomas; David McIlwraith; Wendii Fulford; Daniel Pilon; Victoria Barkoff
- Country of origin: Canada
- No. of seasons: 1
- No. of episodes: 26

Production
- Running time: 25 mins
- Production companies: MicroTainment Plus International; Les Productions La Fête

Original release
- Network: YTV
- Release: September 15, 2001 – May 4, 2002

Vampire High is a Canadian teen drama horror TV series that originally aired from 2001 to 2002. The show centered on a group of young vampires subjected to a daring experiment by the "Elders": taken in by a boarding school that also housed mortal teenagers, with the intent of civilizing the vampires. Many problems faced the students on both the day and night curriculum, including typical teen issues of love, friends and enemies. Professor Murdoch was on hand to help them along with their school work, but he too had problems that could put the lives of the teens in mortal danger.

== Synopsis ==
The opening title sequence featured Murdoch narrating the brief history of the experiment - "When The Great Eclipse plunged the world into darkness, the vampire race erupted in a civil war. The bloodthirsty 'Fury' battled the enlightened Elders for domination of the undead. In desperation, the Elders gathered up those young vampires that could be saved and entrusted them to me. To humanize them, to tame their instincts and teach them how to live among mortals."

Mansbridge Academy is a private boarding school, the last stop for troubled rich kids. The parents, not knowing what to do with the teens leave them at the secluded boarding school hoping for some resolution. But the main focus of the series is the school at night. Five vampires – Drew, Karl, Essie, Marty and Merrill – are also students at the school trying to become more civilized, from the instruction of Murdoch, the head teacher of Mansbridge Academy. Sent to the school by their Elders, the vampires try to come to terms with the problems that occur.

When we begin at the start of the series, we are introduced to Sherry, a mortal female who feels lost and lonely in life. Not only does she crave love but she needs it to survive but can only seek comfort in her best friend Mimi. Knowing her boyfriend Nick is not the person she is destined to be with Sherry spends her time working, thinking and recording her thoughts on a Dictaphone.

As night falls we are introduced to many vampire characters. Karl, the sporty, troublesome teen and the youngest of the vampires who yearns to return to his life as a human; meek Merrill who is smart and wants to do well, and dreams of making Drew her soulmate; popular and beautiful Essie, a royal by birth, hides her emotions behind a vain and fashionable exterior; bad boy Marty who only joined the experiment for the endless supply of free blood; and Drew, a dark and mysterious vampire who falls in love with the mortal student, Sherry.

== Cast ==
=== Main ===
- Jeff Roop as Drew French, a dark, silent and mysterious vampire, and reluctant leader of the "night students". He has been a vampire since the 1800s, and in his mortal life, had been an artist named Edward Vincente. He falls in love with a mortal, Sherry Woods, who Drew believes is his "One", a vampiric term referring to one's soul mate. Drew has the power to see and hear things happening far away. When Sherry dies, Drew is deeply affected and almost returns to his predatory ways in the hopes that reclaiming his emotionless vampiric life will make the pain of losing Sherry go away. When this doesn't work, he plans to kill himself by sunlight but is confronted by Dillan who tells him that killing himself would only dishonor Sherry's memory.
- Meghan Ory as Sherry Woods, an unusual mortal girl who falls in love with a vampire, namely Drew. Before Drew came into her life, she had a relationship with fellow human student Nick McAllister, which she broke off because of his arrogant, dominating personality. However, she seems to have some unresolved feelings about Nick, because she doesn`t completely ignore his endless attempts to get her back. But eventually she does end up giving her heart to Drew, which leads to tragic results. Right after Sherry finds out that Drew is a vampire, she develops appendicitis (which may or may not have been brought on by a jealous Merrill), her appendix bursting before an ambulance arrives. Drew attempts to turn her into a vampire to save her but before he can bite her, she dies.
- Ilona Elkin as Merrill Young, vampire. She initially appears timid, bookish and soft-spoken, but as the series progresses, it becomes apparent that Merrill does have a conniving and often malevolent side she tries to keep suppressed. She believes that Drew is her 'One,' and is deeply upset when he falls for Sherry. In her jealousy, she possibly causes the appendicitis attack which kills Sherry, a possibility which haunts her afterwards. She later begins to develop an attraction to another vampire, Marty. Merrill has the power to read other people's minds and dream slide. Of all the vampires, she is the one most determined to succeed at the experiment. She is also the only one whose "Maker" (i.e. the vampire who converted her) is identified, namely a trashy, trampy vampire named Patsy LaRue. As an extra note, she keeps a pet rat she calls Bela.
- Paul Hopkins as Karl Todman, a newbie vampire who is easily led astray in the program, particularly by Marty. He looks up to Drew, and has a romantic relationship with Essie. Prior to becoming a vampire, he was a popular football player at his old high school, Wrenfield High, located a few miles from Mansbridge. As the youngest of the vampires, Karl is shown having the most trouble adapting to his situation, and often yearns for his old life. His first bite as a vampire was on a female ex-classmate at Wrenfield on whom he had a crush, draining her on the night of their school prom. He has a mother and younger sister, neither of whom know that he is a vampire.
- Karen Cliche as Essie Rachimova, a glamorous vampire of royal lineage. She was originally a member of the Russian Royal Court just before the Revolution, and claims that Tsar Nicholas II, Tsaritsa Alexandra Feodorovna and Grigori Rasputin were all vampires. She develops an awkward and turbulent relationship with Karl. Essie has the power of hypnotic suggestion, sometimes using this power to wipe the memories of people who accidentally witness the vampires' activities.
- Joris Jarsky as Marty Strickland, another vampire. Somewhat wayward and rebel-esque, Marty is noted for his humorous outlook on life and light-hearted nature. He initially agrees to join in the Mansbridge Experiment because of the offer of a free and regular supply of blood, but starts to rediscover his lost humanity in spite of himself. He has an intense rivalry with Drew, and becomes romantically interested in Merrill Young. Marty has the power to telekinetically move objects with his mind.
- David McIlwraith as Dr Reginald Murdoch, the enigmatic and mysterious head of Mansbridge High, and of the Mansbridge Experiment. He has his work cut out for him not only in trying to make the Mansbridge Experiment a success, and dealing with the problems of both the night and the day students, but also in keeping the one group from snacking on the other. It is not fully revealed exactly what he is, though there are hints he is neither human nor vampire. His unique status may explain why he is impervious to many of his vampire students' gifts, like Essie's talent of hypnotic suggestion, or why he is capable of subduing an out-of-control Karl, not to mention why he never seems to sleep.
- Marianne Farley as Dillan Vanderson, a human student. A late comer into the year at Mansbridge, Dillan has a strong personality which may cause more harm than good. On the night Dillan first arrives to Manbridge, it is suspected by Merrill that she is possessed by the spirit of a legendary huntress named Diana Valmont, who fell in love with a vampire long ago. According to legend, after the vampire killed her, she comes back in human form every year on the day she was killed to slay male vampires who seduce mortal women. Ironically, it turns out to be Sherry who is possessed by the Huntress, not Dillan. She at first targets Drew to prevent him from killing Sherry, but he insists that he will not kill her because his love is pure. Afterwards, the Huntress releases Sherry who then befriends Dillan, who has become her roommate. After Sherry's death, it appears that Dillan will be the one to take her place as Drew's love interest. In the last episode, after she seemingly recovers from being bitten by Karl, as Dillan says goodbye to the other students for the summer, her eyes momentarily turn red when she comes close to Mimi's neck, indicating that she is not fully recovered and may be turning into a vampire. However, this is not explored further due to the cancellation of the series.

=== Supporting ===
- Jodie Resther as Mimi Sperling, best friend to Sherry and later to Dillan after Sherry passes away. She is the daughter of a former rock star, and, like Sherry, hates being at Mansbridge. Unlike Sherry however, Mimi does acknowledge that she needs to be there. Mimi never realizes how close she becomes to being a victim of a vampire.
- Adam MacDonald as Nick McAllister, ex-boyfriend to Sherry. Because of his obsession with Sherry, he has a strong rivalry with Drew even though the two never meet. He is a mean, insensitive jock who frequently bullies fellow Mansbridge student Malcolm Frye, partly because he suspects him of being Sherry`s secret admirer. Although it is not shown how he and Malcolm react to Sherry`s death, by the end of the series an odd kind of bonding seems to have developed between the two, possibly over the loss of Sherry in their lives.
- Patrick Thomas as Malcolm Frye, friend to Sherry and Mimi, bully magnet for Nick, and resident computer whiz at Mansbridge Academy. A former classmate of Karl's at Wrenfield High, Malcolm unwittingly causes trouble for the vampire students when he posts his sighting of the supposedly deceased Karl at Mansbridge on the internet. A jealous Nick suspects him of being Sherry`s secret admirer, but in actuality, Malcolm has a crush on government agent Marianne Hackett, and is an enthusiastic fan of her organization BPDA. He also has a fascination with vampires, ghosts, and the possibility of life after death. (Note: According to his character bio on the original series website, in spite of all his claims to his fellow students that he likewise comes from wealthy parents, Malcolm is in fact the son of the school security guard, Dwight Frye.)
- Daniel Pilon as Vakaal, one of the Elders who have control over the Mansbridge experiment, and who acts as their liaison with Murdoch. He is clearly ancient even by vampire standards - possibly thousands of years old - and so powerful even Marty is unwilling to cross him. He frequently makes surprise visits to Mansbridge to check up on how the Experiment is progressing.
- Wendii Fulford as Marianne Hackett, an agent and leading investigator for the Biomorphic Predatory Disease Agency (BPDA), a government organization which claims to specialize in dealing with rare and deadly diseases, but is in fact dedicated to finding and exterminating vampires. A veteran vampire hunter, she suspects that there are vampires at or around Mansbridge, and is determined to prove it. She also suspects that Murdoch is connected to the suspicious activities surrounding Mansbridge, but it is unclear whether her apparent attraction to him is purely pretend or sincere. Her favorite weapon when fighting vampires is a laser gun, although she is also handy with a crossbow.
- Victoria Barkoff as Doctor

=== Notes ===
- In this series, although the vampires have to sleep in coffins during the day and are burned if directly exposed to sunlight (as in the movies), there is no mention if they are repulsed by garlic or crucifixes, or any other traditional way of warding off vampires. Also, as with Edward Cullen and the other vampires in the Twilight series, they can move faster than the human eye can follow, and are much stronger than humans. Also as with the Twilight vampires, each vampire generally has its own unique gift or ability, such as Essie's gift of mind wiping, or Marty's gift of telekinesis, or Merrill's ability to read minds. Although the vampires are immortal, this series states that the older they grew, the weaker and slower they become, until they are eternally locked in a paralytic state.
- Although spelled differently, Wrenfield High is clearly named as a nod to Renfield, the madman who wanted to become a vampire from Bram Stoker's Dracula. Also, Dwight Frye, Malcolm's father and the school security guard, is clearly named after the actor Dwight Frye, who famously played the character in the classic 1931 film version of Dracula. Although Dwight is referred to throughout the series, his only appearance is at the beginning of the second episode There's a New Vampire in Town. According to actor Adam McDonald, who played Nick McAllister, he was supposed to also appear in the episode Dads and Monsters, where he becomes possessed by an evil vampire, but due to an accident involving the actor playing the character, the story was hastily re-written so that Nick becomes possessed instead.
- There are several continuity errors surrounding the character Karl. According to Malcolm Frye in the episode Little Sister, he was wearing his old Wrenfield High school jacket when they had their run-in earlier which he posted about on the internet. Yet in the actual episode where that occurs (A Grave Matter), Karl was in fact jacketless. Also, in the episode The Summoning, it is stated that Karl had killed at least two people before being recruited into the Mansbridge Experiment, namely his best friend and his high school crush, but according to Marty and himself in the episode Blood Trip, he has only one killing to his credit.
- Another error, particularly concerning the character Karl, concerns Wrenfield High, the school he attended prior to becoming a vampire. Its name, and Karl's and Malcolm's descriptions of it, suggests is it a public high school; however, when Karl's younger sister, Amy, visits Mansbridge on a field trip, she is wearing a school uniform and Malcolm says she lives in a dorm at Wrenfield, suggesting it is a private boarding school like Mansbridge.

== Production ==
Mark Shekter had the idea of the series during a night flight from Toronto to Cairns. At first, he wanted to publish the story as a comic. Later he decided to film the series. Already when the plane landed in Cairns he had written the first Episode of Vampire High.

During the filming not all episodes were completely written. More scripts followed and the actors could also take a little part in the development of their characters. The production of the series, was stopped in the middle of the series, because of budget reasons. Shortly afterwards it was continued. Then Meghan Ory wanted to leave the series, which is why her character Sherry had to be written out of Vampire High. A new main character, Dillan Vanderson, played by Marianne Farley was introduced.

Vampire High consists of 26 episodes and takes place at the fictional Mansbridge Academy. After the first season, the series was canceled, even though the script of the second season was already written. Reasons for the cancellation were not named.

In 2011 the documentary Vampire High: 10 Years Later Documentary was produced by ATV. In the 25 minutes documentary the production of the series is discussed.

== Episodes ==
No.	Title	Directed by	Written by	Original release date	U.S. air date
1	"Rules Are Rules"	Carl Goldstein	Mark Shekter	September 15, 2001	January 7, 2002
A group of young vampires are brought to a boarding school so they can be integrated into human society. Drew, a vampire, forms a psychic bond with Sherry, a human.
2	"There's a New Vampire in Town"	Adam Weissman	Craig Volk	September 22, 2001	January 14, 2002
New vampire Marty joins the group and immediately starts breaking the rules.
3	"In Your Dreams"	Carl Goldstein	Laura Kosterski	September 29, 2001	January 21, 2002
Sherry mistakenly believes that her old boyfriend is her secret admirer, and Drew attempts to contact her in her dreams.
4	"A Grave Matter"	Adam Weissman	Alex Epstein	October 6, 2001	January 28, 2002
Karl becomes depressed and agitated, and is spotted by a former classmate who realizes he's supposed to be dead. Murdoch fends off a special investigator who's on the trail of vampires.
5	"Things That Go Vamp in the Night"	Carl Goldstein	Mark Shekter	October 13, 2001	February 4, 2002
Drew attempts to contact Sherry through her Ouija board, but Marty gets up to his old tricks.
6	"That's Why the Lady Is a Vamp"	Daniel Grou	Ann MacNaughton	October 20, 2001	February 11, 2002
Merrill's maker shows up in response to a psychic call and wants to take her away from Mansbridge Academy.
7	"Feeding Frenzy"	Carl Goldstein	Matthew Hasting	October 27, 2001	February 18, 2002
Murdoch tries to wean the students off of real blood, but when Essie and Marty go to town to test the experiment, something goes horribly wrong.
8	"What's Up, Doc?"	Jimmy Kaufman	Craig Volk & Laura Kosterski	November 3, 2001	February 25, 2002
The students become curious about Dr. Murdoch.
9	"The Withering"	Giles Walker	Laura Kosterski	November 10, 2001	March 4, 2002
The withering, a period of vampire cellular regeneration, causes Essie to age at an alarming rate.
10	"Dads and Monsters"	Daniel Grou	Mark Shekter	November 17, 2001	March 11, 2002
The Fury sends a monster to destroy the Experiment. Meanwhile, Sherry's dad visits the Mansbridge Academy.
11	"Rats"	Adam Weissman	Laura Kosterski	November 24, 2001	March 18, 2002
Drew gets jealous when Sherry falls for a new student. Meanwhile, Merrill searches for her lost pet rat.
12	"The Quivering"	Adam Weissman	Mark Shekter	December 1, 2001	March 25, 2002
Merrill has a psychic premonition of her own death.
13	"The Summoning"	Jimmy Kaufman	Michael Donovan	December 8, 2001	April 1, 2002
Dr. Murdoch leads the night students in an ancient memory exercise that allows each one of the vampires to revisit the kill that they most regret.
14	"Odd Man Out"	Jimmy Kaufman	Anne-Marie Perrotta & Tean Schultz	December 15, 2001	April 8, 2002
Marty puts a love spell on Essie, but it may endanger his life. Meanwhile, Merrill gives Drew a book about vampires finding love.
15	"The Test"	Jimmy Kaufman	Mark Shekter	February 16, 2002	April 15, 2002
When Drew flunks Murdoch's latest blood-lust test, he's more determined than ever to prove his teacher wrong, and decides to use Sherry as his own personal testing subject. Meanwhile, Sherry helps Mimi struggle with being accused of cheating on a test.
16	"Little Sister"	Daniel Grou	Laura Kosterski & Jennifer Furlong	February 23, 2002	April 22, 2002
Karl's little sister visits the Academy, looking for the spirit of her brother.
17	"Love's Labours Not Lost"	Daniel Grou	Gerald Wexler	March 2, 2002	April 29, 2002
When Dr. Murdoch experiences a haunting by a ghost, Merrill and Marty discover the only way to rid him of this being is by Merrill allowing the ghost to possess her and speak to Murdoch. Meanwhile, Karl helps Drew come to terms with his relationship with Sherry.
18	"The Huntress"	Jimmy Kaufman	Sherman Snukal & Laura Kosterski	March 9, 2002	May 6, 2002
An evil spirit, who is set on destroying any vampire to dare love a mortal, for she was killed by one, targets his wrath on Drew and his love for Sherry. Meanwhile, Merrill and Essie investigate the new Day School girl, Dillan, and try to determine what her story is.
19	"The Portrait"	Érik Canuel	Nancy Trites Botkin & Laura Kosterski	March 16, 2002	May 13, 2002
While pursuing their romance, Sherry convinces Drew to paint her portrait which leads to an unexpected side effect as well as the revelation of Drew's past - and true name.
20	"The Awakening"	Érik Canuel	Mark Shekter	March 23, 2002	May 20, 2002
After being expelled from Mansbridge Academy, Drew reveals his true identity but before he can leave, mortal Sherry falls mysteriously ill and he considers turning her and taking her with him. Meanwhile, Merrill is distraught over Drew's expulsion and takes drastic measures, and Karl finds vampire laws that could save Drew.
21	"Both Sides Now"	Daniel Grou	Ann MacNaughton	March 30, 2002	May 27, 2002
Merrill's repressed feelings begin to surface. Together with Dr. Murdoch, they must find out what those feelings are before she loses control. A student has been attacked in the library due to Dr. Murdoch's intervention the attack was broken off, but the assailant is unknown. Who could it have been? Merrill must find a way to accept her dark side; otherwise she could lose her fight to humanity.
22	"Sunrise"	Daniel Grou	Mark Shekter	April 6, 2002	May 27, 2002
A grief-stricken, embittered Drew embraces the dark side of his predatory nature and conjures up an ancient force to become all powerful, after the death of his beloved. Meanwhile, Dillan and Mimi meet and bond over Sherry's death.
23	"Lost Weekend"	Jimmy Kaufman	Mark Shekter	April 13, 2002	February 3, 2003
During spring break, Marty and Merrill have the school to themselves, and together, they discover their blood supply is locked up. The unlikely duo goes through withdrawal while resisting the urge to feed off each other but temptation arises when a day student returns early - and alone.
24	"Breaking Up"	Jimmy Kaufman	Mark Shekter & Sherman Snukal	April 20, 2002	February 10, 2003
When Karl asks Essie to acknowledge their love in a formal Declaration ceremony, Essie falls sick with a mysterious illness that proves dangerous even to vampires.
25	"Blood Trip"	Érik Canuel	Mark Shekter	April 27, 2002	February 17, 2003
Evading government agents, a rogue vampire stumbles upon Mansbridge Academy and not only threatens the Experiment but selects Karl as the one she wants to turn to the dark side. Meanwhile, Dillan finds a speech written by Drew and becomes attracted to him.
26	"Vampire's Patient"	Érik Canuel	Mark Shekter	May 4, 2002	February 24, 2003
After day student Dillan is attacked by a suddenly crazed Karl, Drew must choose between saving her life or helping her face the prospect of becoming a vampire. Meanwhile, the search is on for Bridget, the rogue vampire, and if she is not found or Dillan is "turned", the Experiment is terminated.

== DVD releases ==
At 1 March 2005 the first DVD for the series was published. Four episodes were cut together into a 90 minutes film. The film was published with the title Vampire High — School's A Pain In The Neck!. A few time later the next two DVDs with the titles Vampire High: Second Semester High School Bites and Vampire High Bites Back. They're Dying To Meet You! followed.

There are three DVDs for Vampire High that are currently available.

DVD title	Episode list
Vampire High- School's A Pain In The Neck	Episode 1: Rules Are Rules Episode 2: There's a New Vampire in Town Episode 3: In Your Dreams Episode 4: A Grave Matter
Vampire High- Second Semester: High School Bites	Episode 5: Things That Go Vamp in the Night Episode 6: That's Why the Lady Is a Vamp Episode 7: Feeding Frenzy
Vampire High- Bites Back: They're Dying To Meet You!	Episode 8: What's Up Doc? Episode 9: The Withering Episode 10: Dads and Monsters

== Reception ==
The reception of the series was mixed. H.M. Grynberg of Unification France believes that the mythology about the origin of the vampires, the vampire relationships with humans, the other supernatural beings and the legends within the series are interesting, however there are only shown with a few passion. The cliffhanger at the end of the series leaves a feeling of being incomplete. Dolan Cummings of Spiked thinks, that Vampire High lacks a strong female lead similar to Buffy Summers from Buffy the Vampire Slayer. According to him the female characters of Vampire High are similar to the stereotype of the submissive Asian female. However, the series doesn't show the women who reject their traditional roles to become doctors or accountants, which is according to him a little boring. The series has only little violence and humor. However, there some "decent vampire one-liners" (like This place sucks, and not in a good way) and he thinks that there are worse ways to spend the time.

== See also ==
- Vampire film
- List of vampire television series
