= The Line King: The Al Hirschfeld Story =

1996 film

- Directed by: Susan Warms Dryfoos
- Written by: Susan Warms Dryfoos
- Produced by: Angelo Corrao; Susan Warms Dryfoos
- Narrated by: Marilyn Erskine
- Cinematography: Dick Blofson; Jeffrey Grunther
- Edited by: Angelo Corrao
- Distributed by: Castle Hill Productions
- Release date: September 27, 1996
- Running time: 86 minutes
- Country: United States
- Language: English

The Line King: The Al Hirschfeld Story is a 1996 American documentary film directed by Susan Warms Dryfoos about the artist Al Hirschfeld. It was nominated for an Academy Award for Best Documentary Feature. After its theatrical release, PBS broadcast the film in 1999 in a shortened version on American Masters.
