= Other Cannibals =

2021 German film directed by Francesco Sossai

- Italian: Altri Cannibali
- Directed by: Francesco Sossai
- Written by: Adriano Candiago; Francesco Sossai
- Produced by: Cecilia Trautvetter
- Starring: Walter Giroldini; Diego Pagotto
- Cinematography: Giulia Schelhas
- Edited by: Ginevra Giacon
- Production companies: German Film and Television Academy Berlin
- Release date: November 21, 2021 (PÖFF)
- Running time: 96 minutes
- Country: Germany
- Language: Italian

Other Cannibals (Italian: Altri Cannibali) is an Italian black comedy film, directed by Francesco Sossai and released in 2021. The film stars Walter Giroldini as Fausto, a depressed factory worker in a small town who invites a stranger named Ivan (Diego Pagotto) to town to fulfill a mysterious deal they have made on the internet, only to develop an unexpected friendship that complicates their intentions.

The film premiered at the 2021 Tallinn Black Nights Film Festival, where it was the winner of the First Feature Competition. It was screened at the 2022 Vancouver International Film Festival, where it was named the winner of the Vanguard Award.
