= Marguerite (2017 film) =

- Film poster
- Directed by: Marianne Farley
- Written by: Marianne Farley
- Produced by: Marie-Hélène Panisset
- Starring: Béatrice Picard; Sandrine Bisson
- Cinematography: Marc Simpson-Threlford
- Edited by: Mathieu Bélanger
- Music by: Julien Knafo
- Production companies: DIY Films; Les Films de L'Hydre
- Distributed by: H264 Distribution
- Release date: 12 November 2017 (Taipei)
- Running time: 19 minutes
- Country: Canada
- Language: French

Marguerite is a 2017 Canadian short drama film, written and directed by Marianne Farley. The film stars Béatrice Picard and Sandrine Bisson.

The film premiered at the Taipei Golden Horse Film Festival on 12 November 2017. In 2018, it screened at both LGBT and general film festivals. It was one of 12 short films selected for screening on Ici TOU.TV in conjunction with the 2018 Rendez-vous Québec Cinéma film festival.

== Plot ==
An elderly woman confronts her own long-repressed romantic feelings for another woman after learning that her home care nurse is a lesbian.

== Cast ==
- Béatrice Picard as Marguerite
- Sandrine Bisson as Rachel

== Awards ==
Marguerite won numerous film festival awards, including Best Actress (International) for Béatrice Picard at Short Shorts Film Festival & Asia (Japan), Best Short Film at QFilms Long Beach, Best Short Film at TWIST: Seattle Queer Film Festival, Best Short Film Female at FilmOut San Diego, Best Women's Short Audience Award at Wicked Queer (Boston), and the Live Action Short Grand Prize at Academy Award-qualifying Rhode Island International Film Festival. It received an Oscar nomination for Best Live Action Short Film at the 91st Academy Awards.

== See also ==
- List of LGBT-related films directed by women
