= Wayne Lavallee =

Wayne Lavallee is a Métis actor and singer-songwriter from Vancouver, British Columbia, Canada.

He began his career with Vancouver's Spiritsong indigenous theatre company in 1990. His stage roles have included productions of Drew Hayden Taylor's alterNatives and The BuzGem Blues.

Concurrently with his acting career he also performed as a musician in the Vancouver area, later releasing the album Green Dress in 2004. The album won the Canadian Aboriginal Music Award for album of the year in 2004, was a Juno Award nominee for Aboriginal Recording of the Year at the Juno Awards of 2005, and won the Canadian Folk Music Award for Aboriginal Songwriter of the Year at the 2nd Canadian Folk Music Awards in 2006.

His followup album Trail of Tears, released in 2009, won the awards for Best Male Artist, Best Rock Album and Best Acoustic Folk Album at the 2010 Aboriginal Music Awards, was a Juno nominee for Aboriginal Album of the Year at the Juno Awards of 2010, and a Canadian Folk Music Award nominee for Aboriginal Songwriter of the Year at the 6th Canadian Folk Music Awards.

In recent years he has composed music for theatre, film and television, including the films The Road Forward, Red Snow, Bones of Crows, Broken Angel, Lay Down Your Heart, Sweet Summer Pow Wow and How We Stand, the television series Dr. Savannah: Wild Rose Vet, and Taylor's stage play Cerulean Blue. He received a Canadian Screen Award nomination for Best Original Song at the 11th Canadian Screen Awards in 2023 for "You Are My Bones", a song cowritten with Marie Clements and Jesse Zubot for Bones of Crows.

He also has a small acting role in How We Stand, playing singer-songwriter Kris Kristofferson.
