= Choi Seung-yoon =

South Korean actress and dancer

Choi Seung-yoon is a South Korean actress and dancer, most noted for her performance as So-Young in the 2022 film Riceboy Sleeps.

She won the award for Best Actress at the 2022 Marrakech International Film Festival, and the Vancouver Film Critics Circle award for Best Actress in a Canadian Film at the Vancouver Film Critics Circle Awards 2022. She received a Canadian Screen Award nomination for Best Lead Performance in a Film at the 11th Canadian Screen Awards in 2023.
