= Anyox (film) =

- Directed by: Ryan Ermacora; Jessica Johnson
- Written by: Ryan Ermacora; Jessica Johnson
- Produced by: Alysha Seriani; Ryan Ermacora; Jessica Johnson
- Cinematography: Jeremy Cox
- Edited by: Ryan Ermacora; Jessica Johnson
- Music by: Lea Bertucci
- Release date: March 12, 2022 (Cinéma du Réel)
- Running time: 97 minutes
- Country: Canada
- Language: English

Anyox is a Canadian documentary film, directed by Ryan Ermacora and Jessica Johnson and released in 2022. The film is a history of the ghost town of Anyox, British Columbia, and profiles both the environmental impacts of its abandoned mining facilities and the history of labour relations in the town before its abandonment.

The film premiered in March 2022 at the Cinéma du Réel film festival in France and was screened in September at the Open City Documentary Festival in England. It had its Canadian premiere at the 2022 Vancouver International Film Festival.

The film was longlisted for the Directors Guild of Canada's 2022 Jean-Marc Vallée DGC Discovery Award.
