= The Christmas Choir =

- Official Film Poster
- Written by: Donald Martin
- Directed by: Peter Svatek
- Starring: Jason Gedrick; Rhea Perlman; Tyrone Benskin; Michael Sarrazin; Marianne Farley; Cindy Sampson
- Music by: James Gelfand
- Countries of origin: Canada; United States
- Original language: English

Production
- Producer: Michael Prupas
- Cinematography: Eric Cayla
- Editor: Stephanie Gregoire
- Running time: 90 minutes

Original release
- Network: Hallmark Channel
- Release: December 9, 2008

The Christmas Choir is a 2008 American-Canadian made-for-television Christmas drama film written by Donald Martin and directed by Peter Svatek, and based upon a true story of a man who volunteered to work at a homeless shelter and started a choir with its residents. The film first aired on December 9, 2008 on Hallmark Channel. The film was Michael Sarrazin's final screen role. The film was inspired by the true story of Pierre Anthian and the Montreal Accueil Bonneau Choir.

== Plot ==
Peter Brockman (Jason Gedrick) is a successful accountant and engaged to be married. Then, nineteen days before Christmas, his life is turned upside down when his fiancée Jill (Cindy Sampson) dumps him, telling him he is an emotionally detached workaholic. While drinking a soda at a lounge, he has a chance encounter with Bob (Tyrone Benskin), a blues pianist and singer, who is working there solely for tips. The two talk about their mutual love of music, and of Peter's childhood dream of becoming a musician. When Bob invites Peter to his house for dinner and a jam session, Peter is amazed by the musical abilities of the other occupants. Unbeknownst to him, the home is actually a shelter for homeless people. He eventually meets the woman who runs the shelter, a caring, but also tough and straight-talking nun, Sister Agatha (Rhea Perlman). He decides the best way he can help the shelter and its members create income and opportunities is to organize some of the men into a choir.

The choir improves, becoming more proficient each day. Meanwhile, Peter and the other members go through their own personal problems, problems that create obstacles to the choir's success. But they succeed, with the men growing emotionally and coping far better with their problems because of the self-respect and dignity they gain from being part of the choir. Their interdependence in the choir also leads them to helping one another in life as well. Eventually the choir becomes truly wonderful, and successful. They begin by performing in the subway, but soon are giving real concerts as well. Peter also meets Marilyn, a woman who helps him grow into a far better man.

As mentioned above, the movie is based on a true story, the story of the Montreal Accueil Bonneau Choir (also known as the Montreal Homeless Choir), and its founder and director Pierre Anthian. Just one example of how this choir has transformed the lives of its members is the story of Nicolas “Colas” Allaire. When he joined the choir he was in his 60s. Colas was raised in an orphanage until age 17. With no formal education and no family, friends, or money, he was never able to find work. In winter he made snow caves to keep from freezing to death. Sometimes he committed crimes just to be put in jail so he would have food to eat every day. Since joining the choir, he says, “my life has been paradise. I have made friends, and I have started to support myself. I now have a small apartment, and I am happy.”

The choir is described as having achieved significant recognition, producing six CDs, touring internationally, and influencing audiences across regions.

== Selected cast ==
- Jason Gedrick as Peter Brockman
- Rhea Perlman as Sister Agatha
- Tyrone Benskin as Bob
- Michael Sarrazin as Henry Brockman
- Marianne Farley as Marilyn
- Roc LaFortune as Hector
- John Dunn-Hill as Fred
- Luis Oliva as Juan
- Claudia Ferri as Rita
- Cindy Sampson as Jill Crosby

== Reception ==
Of its 2009 DVD release, Movie2Movie wrote that the film deals with real people and their very real problems. They also say that at first glance the film can seem like just another holiday film, most of which have little substance, but that it really should not be lumped in with these typical Christmas movies. It is a much better film than that; it has real strength due to its being based upon real events.

The film won the Epiphany Prize for Inspiring Television at the 2009 Movieguide Awards.

== Release ==
The film had its release on DVD in December 2009 in the Netherlands. It was released in 2011 on DVD in Sweden as Julkören.

== See also ==
- List of Christmas films
