= Lay Down Your Heart =

2022 Canadian film directed by Marie Clements

- Directed by: Marie Clements
- Written by: Marie Clements; Niall McNeil
- Produced by: Shirley Vercruysse
- Starring: Niall McNeil
- Cinematography: Mike McKinlay
- Edited by: Sarah Hedar
- Music by: Wayne Lavallee
- Production company: National Film Board of Canada
- Release date: October 6, 2022 (VIFF)
- Running time: 70 minutes
- Country: Canada
- Language: English

Lay Down Your Heart is a 2022 Canadian documentary film, directed by Marie Clements. The film is a portrait of Niall McNeil, a Vancouver-based theatre performer and writer with Down syndrome.

The film premiered on October 6, 2022, at the Vancouver International Film Festival, where it was named the winner of the Audience Award for the Portraits program.
