= Canadian Screen Award for Best Lead Performance in a Film =

Canadian award related to films

The Canadian Screen Award for Best Lead Performance in a Film was an award presented by the Academy of Canadian Cinema and Television as part of the Canadian Screen Awards program, to honour the best leading performance in a theatrical film.

It was a merger of the former awards for Best Actor and Best Actress, following the academy's announcement in August 2022 that it would start presenting gender-neutral acting awards instead of gendered ones. The category was presented only at the 11th Canadian Screen Awards in 2023; beginning with the 12th Canadian Screen Awards in 2024, it was split into separate awards for Best Lead Performance in a Comedy Film and Best Lead Performance in a Drama Film.

== 2020s ==
Year	Actor	Film	Ref
2022; 11th Canadian Screen Awards
2022; 11th Canadian Screen Awards	Lamar Johnson	Brother	
2022; 11th Canadian Screen Awards	Choi Seung-yoon	Riceboy Sleeps	
2022; 11th Canadian Screen Awards	Monia Chokri	Babysitter	
2022; 11th Canadian Screen Awards	Larissa Corriveau	That Kind of Summer (Un été comme ça)	
2022; 11th Canadian Screen Awards	Kelly Depeault	Noemie Says Yes (Noémie dit oui)	
2022; 11th Canadian Screen Awards	Joseph Engel	Falcon Lake	
2022; 11th Canadian Screen Awards	Steve Laplante	Viking	
2022; 11th Canadian Screen Awards	Maxime Le Flaguais	Rodeo (Rodéo)	
