= Phillip Forest Lewitski =

Canadian actor and producer

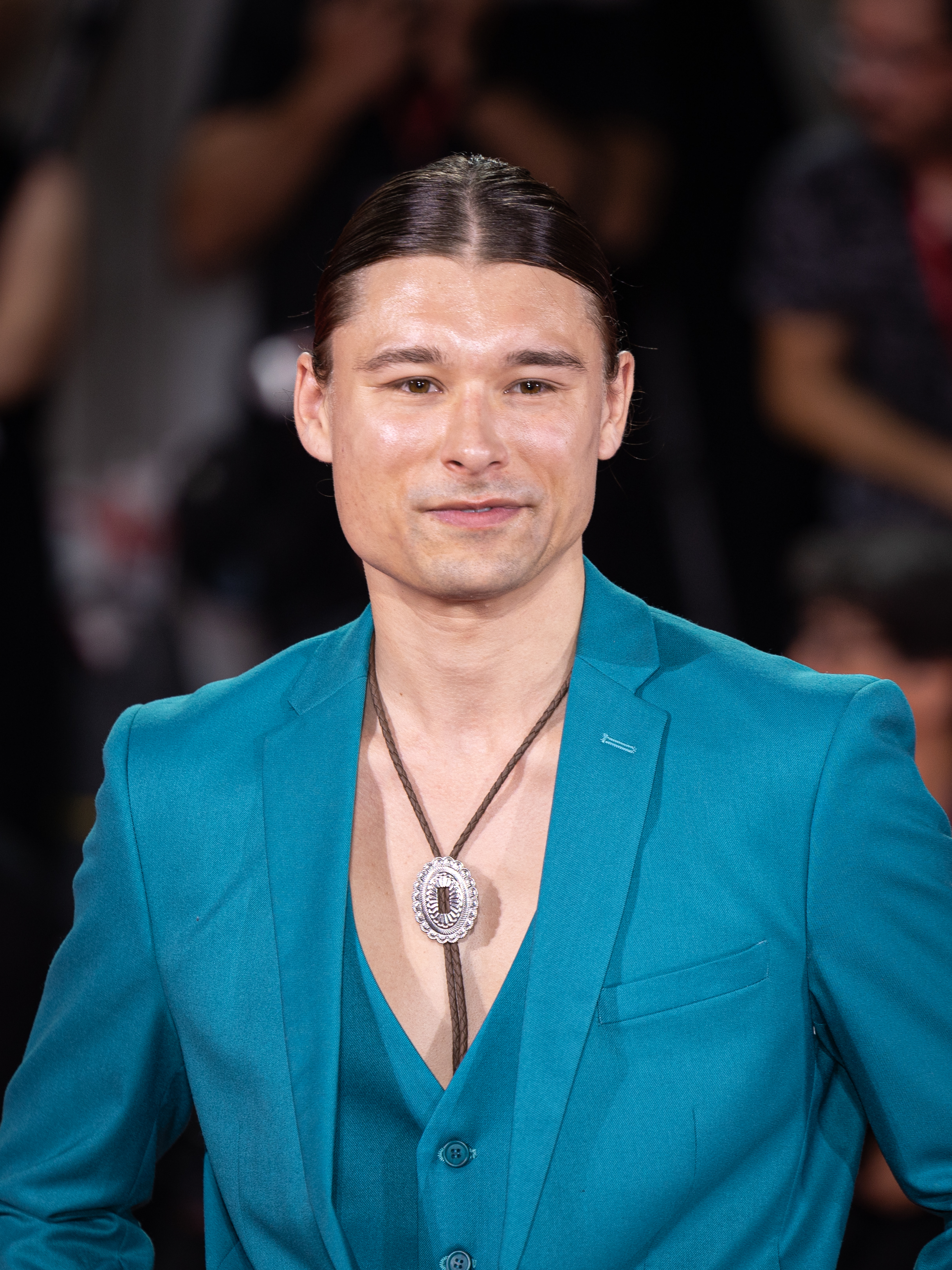
- Phillip Forest Lewitski at the 81st Venice International Film Festival for The Order.
- Occupations: Actor, producer
- Years active: 2014–present

Phillip Forest Lewitski is a Canadian actor and producer. He is known for his roles as Apollo 4 in the television series Utopia Falls, Lincoln "Link" in Bretten Hannam's 2021 film Wildhood, and Adam Whallach in Marie Clements' Bones of Crows. For his performance in Wildhood, Lewitski was selected as a 2021 Toronto International Film Festival Rising Star and received a Canadian Screen Award nomination for Best Actor at the 10th Canadian Screen Awards.

For his performance in Bones of Crows, Lewitski won Outstanding Performance by an Actor in a Leading Role at the 2023 Red Nation International Film Festival and received nominations for Best Lead Performance Male at the Leo Awards and Best Supporting Performance, Motion Picture at the UBCP/ACTRA Awards.

His later credits include Alaska Daily, Masters of the Air, Justin Kurzel's The Order, and Lynne Ramsay's Die My Love. The Order screened in competition at the 81st Venice International Film Festival, while Die My Love competed at the 2025 Cannes Film Festival.

In 2026, Lewitski and Forrest Goodluck were announced among the lead cast of Jon B. Elliot's The Skins Game, with Lewitski also serving as an executive producer.

== Early life ==
Lewitski was born in Calgary, Alberta. He is Métis from the Otipemisiwak Nation and is of Kanien'kehá:ka, French and Ukrainian ancestry.

== Career ==
Lewitski's early television work included appearances in Supernatural and Vikings. In 2020, he starred as Apollo 4 in the Hulu science-fiction series Utopia Falls.

In 2021, Lewitski starred in Bretten Hannam's Wildhood. He was selected as one of the Toronto International Film Festival's 2021 Rising Stars and later received a Canadian Screen Award nomination for Best Actor for his performance.

Lewitski's performance in Bones of Crows earned him Outstanding Performance by an Actor in a Leading Role at the 2023 Red Nation International Film Festival, as well as nominations from the Leo Awards and UBCP/ACTRA Awards.

In 2024, Lewitski appeared in Justin Kurzel's The Order, which screened in competition at the 81st Venice International Film Festival. He later appeared in Lynne Ramsay's Die My Love, which competed at the 2025 Cannes Film Festival.

In 2026, Lewitski and Forrest Goodluck were announced among the lead cast of Jon B. Elliot's The Skins Game, with Lewitski also serving as an executive producer.

== Filmography ==
=== Film ===
Year	Title	Role	Notes
2014	The Search	Patrick	
2014	Straight Line	Adam	Short
2016	Dr. Face	Crowd	Short
2016	Dear Kate	War Veteran	Short
2016	Lockdown	Mike	Short
2017	Incontrol	Connor (Victor)	
2018	A Gentleman	Zaac Manning	
2019	The Search: Manufacturing Belief	Patrick Payne	
2021	Wildhood	Link	
2022	Bones of Crows	Adam Whallach	
2024	The Order	David Lane	
2025	Die My Love	Charlie	
TBA	Wind River: Rising	Kai Burning Grass	
TBA	The Land of Nod	David	
TBA	The Skins Game	Jesse	Also executive producer

=== Television ===
Year	Title	Role	Notes
2016	Heartland	Bartender (uncredited)	Episode: "Risky Business"
2019	Supernatural	Tom Mason	Episode "Don't Go in the Woods"
2020	Utopia Falls	Apollo 4	10 episodes
2020	Vikings	We'jitu	3 episodes
2022–2023	Alaska Daily	Miles	4 episodes
2023	Bones of Crows: The Series	Adam Whallach	5 episodes
2024	Masters of the Air	Lt. Francis Harper	1 episode

== Awards and nominations ==
Year	Award	Category	Work	Result
2022	Canadian Screen Awards	Best Actor	Wildhood	Nominated
2023	Leo Awards	Best Lead Performance Male, Motion Picture	Bones of Crows	Nominated
2023	Red Nation International Film Festival	Outstanding Performance by an Actor in a Leading Role	Bones of Crows	Won
2023	UBCP/ACTRA Awards	Best Supporting Performance, Motion Picture	Bones of Crows	Nominated
