= No Prior Appointment =

2022 Iranian drama film directed by Behrouz Shoaybi

No Prior Appointment (Persian title: Bedoun-e Gharar-e Ghabli/Bedoone Gharare Ghabli, Persian: بدون قرار قبلی) is a 2022 Iranian drama film directed by Behrouz Shoaybi. The film stars Pegah Ahangarani, Mostafa Zamani and Elham Korda in the pivotal roles. The film was produced by mahmood babaei under his production banner Farabi Cinema Foundation.

== Synopsis ==
Yasmin (Pegah Ahangarani), an Iranian immigrant after a long hiatus of 30 years is forced to return to her motherland, as she makes the decision to travel back to Iran soon after being told about the untimely demise of her father.

She makes her way by taking mandatory leave from her current employment as a doctor in Germany, while she is also accompanied by her young autistic son during her travel to Iran. Coincidentally, it was at the age of six years similar to the present age of her son, she migrated to Germany. However, things become further complicated as far as Yasmin is concerned during the travel, due to her son's autistic nature.

== Cast ==
- Pegah Ahangarani as Yasmin
- Mostafa Zamani
- Elham Korda
- Amin Miri
- Mohammad Kiani
- Erfan Ebrahimi
- Saber Abar

== Premiere ==
The film was premiered on 29 September 2022 at the Vancouver International Film Festival. In November 2022, the film had its premiere at the 28th edition of the Minsk International Film Festival Listapad. The film was also shortlisted among a finalized list of seven Iranian films to be screened at the 44th edition of the Moscow International Film Festival in 2022.

In December 2022, the film also found its way to gain a screening slot to have its international premiere at the 20th Chennai International Film Festival. In September 2023, the film was screened in the Migration and Migrants section of the 26th edition of the Religion Today Film Festival which was held in Trento, Italy. In May 2024, it was also screened at the Golden Knight International Film Festival which was held in Sevastopol, Russia.

== Accolades ==
Iranian National Commission for UNESCO certified the film as the film of the year for its interesting premise in portrayal of autism.

The film also garnered nominations for Best Director, Best Cinematography and Best Screenplay at the 2022 Fajr International Film Festival. The film won the Golden Simorgh for Best Film category at the 2022 Fajr Film Festival.

The film also received awards in the categories for Best Film (Golden Saint George), Best Actress (Silver Saint George) and Best Director at the 2022 Moscow International Film Festival.

In September 2023, the film also fetched awards in the Best Actress in the Leading Role category and in the Best Film category at the 19th Kazan International Muslim Film Festival.
