= North of Albany =

2022 Canadian film by Marianne Farley

- Poster
- French: Au nord d'Albany
- Directed by: Marianne Farley
- Written by: Claude Brie; Marianne Farley
- Produced by: Benoit Beaulieu; Marianne Farley
- Starring: Céline Bonnier; Zeneb Blanchet; Eliott Plamondon; Naomi Cormier; Rick Roberts
- Cinematography: Benoit Beaulieu
- Edited by: Aube Foglia
- Music by: Frannie Holder
- Production companies: Slykid & Skykid
- Distributed by: Maison 4:3
- Release dates: September 19, 2022 (Cinéfest); December 2, 2022 (Canada)
- Country: Canada
- Languages: English; French
- Budget: > $1.3 million

North of Albany (French: Au nord d'Albany) is a 2022 Canadian drama film directed by Marianne Farley (in her directorial debut) from a screenplay she co-wrote with Claude Brie. It stars Céline Bonnier, Zeneb Blanchet, and Eliott Plamondon as a Canadian family who run away to the United States. The film was shot in the province of Quebec in the midst of the COVID-19 pandemic in late 2020. The film premiered at Cinéfest on September 19, 2022, and was released in theaters on December 2, 2022, by Maison 4:3.

== Premise ==
A single mother, Annie, flees from the Canadian city of Montreal with her two children Sarah and Felix after Sarah physically attacks a bully. The family's car breaks down, stranding them in the Adirondacks in the American state of New York. There, they meet local mechanic Paul who helps them confront the real reasons they are on the run.

== Cast ==
- Céline Bonnier as Annie, the mother of Sarah and Félix
- Zeneb Blanchet as Sarah, the 15-year-old teenage daughter of Annie and sister of Félix
- Eliott Plamondon as Félix, the 10-year-old son of Annie and brother of Sarah
- Rick Roberts as Paul, a mechanic who lives in the Adirondacks, and Emma's nephew
- Naomi Cormier as Hope
- Sean Tucker as Richard
- Kelly Depeault as Martine
- Frédéric Pierre as Pascal
- Janet Land as Emma, a 65-year-old widow and Paul's aunt

== Production ==
In June 2019, Telefilm Canada revealed three films, including North of Albany, it would fund in the upcoming months. In December 2019, SODEC announced they would also finance it. Marianne Farley got the idea for the film after her car broke down close to the Adirondack Park while she was visiting her brother in the US. Calling the mishap a "shitty adventure", Farley wrote the initial screenplay with her then-spouse Claude Brie. Farley also produced the film with Benoit Beaulieu under their production banner Slykid & Skykid. It is the company's second project after 2020's Our Own (Les Nôtres).

The village of Abercorn, Quebec, stood in for the Adirondacks. Principal photography, delayed several months due to the COVID-19 pandemic, began on October 7, 2020, and concluded on November 16. The crew followed COVID-19 safety protocols by wearing masks, practicing social distancing and receiving frequent temperature measurements while working. Filming also took place in the Laurentian Mountains, the Eastern Townships of Quebec, Châteauguay, the Entrelacs, Lanaudière, Sutton, and West Brome. Director of photography Benoit Beaulieu and camera operator Benoît C. Gauthier shot the film with an Arri Alexa Mini LF camera and vintage Leica R lenses. Drone shots were filmed by aerial photography company DroneStudio Canada. Farley said she did not regret making the film in the midst of a global pandemic. The film's editor was Aube Foglia, and the musical score was composed by Frannie Holder.

== Release ==
The film premiered at Cinéfest on September 19, 2022, and was released in theaters on December 2, 2022.
