= The Intruder (1999 film) =

- Theatrical release poster
- Directed by: David Bailey
- Screenplay by: Jamie Brown
- Based on: The Intruder by Brooke Leimas
- Produced by: Jamie Brown; Pieter Kroonenburg
- Starring: John Hannah; Nastassja Kinski; Charlotte Gainsbourg; Molly Parker
- Cinematography: Jean Lepine
- Edited by: Angelo Corrao
- Music by: Frank Ilfman
- Production companies: GFT Kingsborough Films; Steve Walsh Productions; Studio Eight Productions
- Release date: 19 November 1999 (Italy)
- Running time: 94 minutes
- Countries: Canada; United Kingdom
- Language: English

The Intruder is a 1999 psychological thriller directed by David Bailey from a screenplay by Jamie Brown, based on the novel of the same name by Brooke Leimas. It stars Charlotte Gainsbourg as a woman who suspects she is being stalked, possibly by her husband's first wife, who was murdered three years ago.

== Plot ==
In a police station, a blood-splattered woman named Catherine confesses to killing her husband's first wife earlier that day. Although she produces the murder weapon, Detective Fordham does not believe her, as the crime occurred three years earlier. Catherine explains the events that lead up to the crime.

Three years prior to the murder, Catherine and Nick meet at a gallery. As Catherine leaves, a mugger attacks her. Nick comes to her aid and, when he notices that she is injured, invites her to stay overnight at his apartment while she recuperates from a twisted ankle. The two quickly fall in love and get married. A widower, Nick does not like to talk about his dead wife, Stella. Curious, Catherine questions their friends: Badge, an art broker and former girlfriend of Nick who lives in the loft below them; Charlie, a mathematician and video game programmer who lives below them; and Daisy, Charlie's on-and-off girlfriend. Catherine learns that an intruder murdered Stella three years ago after an apparent struggle. Due to Stella's mental instability, she and Nick had a rocky marriage.

Eventually, Catherine comes to believe that someone has been sneaking into their apartment and vandalizing her possessions. However, the evidence always disappears before she can show it to Nick, who becomes concerned that she is suffering from the same delusions that affected Stella. When Catherine finds Stella's diary, she learns that Stella suspected Nick of infidelity. Jealous and enraged, Stella describes in her diary how she gets revenge on the suspected mistress by destroying her possessions, though the evidence always disappears before she can present it to Nick. When Catherine confides to Charlie that she thinks Stella may still be alive, Charlie says that he believes a wormhole may be allowing Stella, who lives in the past, to interact with Catherine in the present.

Catherine investigates further, contacting Stella's twin sister and ex-husband. Both confirm that she was jealous of an unknown woman, whom Catherine comes to believe is herself. After Daisy and Charlie both die under suspicious circumstances, Catherine borrows Badge's pistol, a new model imported directly from Germany. Nick finally believes her once Stella's diary, which had gone missing, reappears and includes a new entry in which Stella threatens to murder Catherine by name. Nick and Catherine make preparations to stay at a hotel, and Nick leaves to meet her there. As Catherine packs, Stella attacks her with a pair of scissors. After a brief struggle, Catherine shoots and kills Stella in self-defense.

Back in the police station, Catherine is booked and about to be given a psychiatric evaluation when she remembers that the murder weapon, Badge's pistol, can be easily traced. At her urging, the police discover that the pistol was manufactured after the crime took place. With no evidence and disbelieving her story of a wormhole, the police let her go with a warning not to further waste their time. From a distance, Stella jealously watches Nick and Catherine embrace.

== Cast ==
- Charlotte Gainsbourg as Catherine
- Charles Edwin Powell as Nick
- Nastassja Kinski as Badge
- Molly Parker as Daisy
- John Hannah as Charlie
- Marianne Farley as Stella and Nancy
- Mike Tsar as Detective Fordham
- Angelo Tsarouchas as Leiberman
- Tony Robinow as the maintenance man
- Terry Simpson as Larry Jaffe

== Production ==
Shooting took place in Montreal, Canada, in 1999. Bailey later expressed frustration with the shoot and said that shooting in Montreal was the primary reason for the film's failure to be theatrically released.

== Reception ==
Lisa Nesselson of Variety called it "a Gaslight for the '90s" that is more suited for television broadcast than theatrical distribution. Robert Pardi of TV Guide rated it 1/4 stars and wrote that the film's focus on suspense over characterization causes viewers to have nobody with whom they can identify when the plot becomes confusing.

In an interview, Bailey said, "It's not a great film. It's just O.K. I've seen worse."
