= Jodie Resther =

Canadian actress and singer

- Born: Jodie Lynn Resther c. 1977 (age 48–49); Montreal, Quebec, Canada
- Occupations: Actress, singer
- Years active: 1987–present
- Musical career
- Origin: Montreal, Quebec, Canada
- Genres: R&B; Soul; French pop
- Instrument: Vocals
- Labels: Aquarius; DEJA Musique / Unidisc

Jodie Lynn Resther (born c. 1977) is a Canadian actress and singer. In the 1990s she played Kiki in the children's live-action show Are You Afraid of the Dark?, and has been involved in various dramas including Extra! Extra!, Vampire High, Undressed, and Fries With That. In cartoons, she is best known for voicing Francine in the PBS children's animated program Arthur. She also voiced Tecna in the Cinélume dub of Winx Club, and in Deus Ex: Human Revolution. Besides screen and voice acting, Resther has dabbled in music, releasing an R&B album titled Real and a French-language album called Ma Dualité on the DEJA Musique label.

== Filmography ==
=== Film ===
Year	Title	Role	Notes
1987	Fishtales	Schoolgirl	
1988	Tommy Tricker and the Stamp Traveller	Alice	
2000	Arthur's Perfect Christmas	Francine Frensky (voice)	Television film
2002	Abandon	Girl Singer	
2007	I'm Not There	Choir Singer	
2008	Who Is KK Downey?	Charmane	
2008	Serveuses demandées	Candy	
2018	Lemonade	Nurse	
2018	Death Wish	Nurse Rachel	
2019	Good Sam	Faith Haywood	

=== Television ===
Year	Title	Role	Notes	Ref
1988	Extra! Extra!	—N/a	Unknown episodes	
1992–96	Are You Afraid of the Dark?	Kiki		
1996–2022	Arthur	Francine Frensky (voice)		
2001–02	Vampire High	Mimi Sperling	13 episodes	
2002	Undressed	Collette	Episode: "Girls Interrupted"	
2003–04	Mental Block	Sparks	26 episodes	
2004	Fries with That	Customer	Episode: "The Campaign"	
2004–12	Postcards from Buster	Francine Frensky (voice)	6 episodes	
2005–09	Winx Club	Tecna (voice)	Cinelume/RAI English version, Seasons 2-4	
2006–08	Monster Allergy	Bombolo, Bobby Clash (voices)		
2006	Martin Mystery	Hydie (voice)	Episode: "Curse of the Six-String Serenade"	
2016	This Life	Shannon	Episode: "Coping Cards"	
2017	The Disappearance	Henry's Nurse	Episode: "Treasure Hunt"	

=== Video games ===
Year	Title	Role	Notes
1994	Are You Afraid of the Dark?: The Tale of Orpheo's Curse	Kiki	
1998	LeapPad	Additional voice	
2009	Dance Dance Revolution Winx Club	Tecna	
2013	Deus Ex: Human Revolution	Additional voices	

== Discography ==
- Real (2000, Aquarius Records)
- Ma Dualite (2006, Unidisc)
