= The Archivists =

2020 Canadian film

- Directed by: Igor Drljaca
- Written by: Igor Drljaca
- Produced by: Igor Drljaca; Connor Jessup; Albert Shin; Ashley Shields-Muir
- Starring: Noah Reid; Bahia Watson; Maxwell McCabe-Lokos
- Cinematography: Christopher Lew
- Edited by: Rafi Spivak
- Music by: Casey Manierka-Quaile
- Production companies: TimeLapse Pictures; Big & Quiet Pictures
- Release date: September 12, 2020 (TIFF)
- Running time: 14 minutes
- Country: Canada
- Language: English

The Archivists is a 2020 Canadian short drama film, directed by Igor Drljaca. Set in a dystopian future in which all art from the past has been banned, the film centres on William (Noah Reid), Serena (Bahia Watson) and Samuel (Maxwell McCabe-Lokos), an itinerant trio of musicians who happen on a secret room whose contents include an old vinyl record and a phonograph, and are inspired to perform a rendition of one of the album's songs after listening to it.

The film premiered at the 2020 Toronto International Film Festival. It was subsequently named to TIFF's year-end Canada's Top Ten list for short films in 2020.
