= Bryan Demore =

Canadian Film Producer

Bryan Demore is a Canadian filmmaker. He is most noted as a producer of the film Riceboy Sleeps, which he was a Canadian Screen Award nominee for Best Motion Picture at the 11th Canadian Screen Awards in 2023.

The co-founder of A Lasting Dose Productions, he previously adapted a short film Just Living, based on Patrick Lane’s original poem, for which he was also co-director and writer. He produced Anthony Shim’s debut feature film Daughter.
