= The Hermit of Treig =

- Film poster
- Directed by: Lizzie MacKenzie
- Produced by: Naomi Spiro; Lizzie MacKenzie
- Starring: Ken Smith
- Cinematography: Lizzie MacKenzie
- Edited by: Kieran Gosney; Ling Lee
- Music by: Cameron McLellan; Mischa Stevens
- Production companies: Aruna Productions www.arunaproductions.com
- Distributed by: Cosmic Cat (UK)
- Release date: 5 March 2022 (Glasgow)
- Running time: 79 minutes
- Country: Scotland
- Language: English

The Hermit of Treig is a Scottish documentary film, directed by Lizzie MacKenzie and produced by Naomi Spiro. The film is a portrait of Ken Smith, an elderly man who has spent 40 years living in relative isolation in a cabin on the shores of Loch Treig in the Scottish Highlands.

== Release ==
The film premiered on 5 March 2022 at the Glasgow Film Festival, with Smith in attendance as his first time visiting Glasgow in decades. It was released commercially on 25 March.

=== Critical reception ===
On the review aggregator website Rotten Tomatoes, 100% of 8 critics' reviews are positive.

=== Awards ===
It won the Grand Prize at Kendal Mountain Festival 2022.

It won the audience award at the Glasgow Film Festival and the Audience Award for most popular film in the Spectrum program at the 2022 Vancouver International Film Festival.

It won the award for Best Single Documentary at the 2022 British Academy Scotland Awards.
