= Angelo Corrao =

Italian-American film and television editor

- Born: Sicily, Italy
- Education: Queens College
- Occupations: Film and television editor

Angelo Corrao is an Italian-American film and television editor. Born in Sicily, Corrao moved to New York City as a child with his family during World War II. He developed an interest in film editing after majoring in theater at Queens College. He is a member of American Cinema Editors. Corrao won a CINE Golden Eagle for his work on The Line King (1996) and was later nominated for an Eddie Award for his work on Bruce Weber's Chop Suey (2001).

== Selected filmography ==
Year	Title	Role
1986	Dream Lover	Coeditor
1986	Off Beat	Coeditor
1987	The Pick-up Artist	Coeditor
1988	Let's Get Lost	Editor
1989	Signs of Life	Editor
1991	True Colors	Additional editor
1993	A Dangerous Woman	Additional editor
1995	New York News	Editor
1996	The Line King: The Al Hirschfeld Story	Producer, editor
1997	Subway Stories: Tales from the Underground	Editor, "The 5:24" segment
1997	Primary Colors	Additional editor
1999	To Walk with Lions	Editor
1999	The Intruder	Editor
1999	The Lady in Question	Editor
2001	Wonderland	Editor
2007	Damages	Editor, various episodes
