= A Place for Her =

2025 French film

A Place for Her (French: La Maison des femmes) is a 2025 French drama film written and directed by Mélisa Godet. The story follows the daily life of a team working in a "Maison des femmes" (Women's Shelter), a place dedicated to supporting women who are victims of violence. Through the experiences of characters such as Diane, Manon, Inès, and Awa, the film depicts the work of caregivers and activists who help women rebuild their lives through care, solidarity, and support.

The film was produced in France and has a running time of about 111 minutes. After a premiere at the 2025 Marrakech International Film Festival, it was released on 4 March 2026 and distributed by Pathé Films.

== Cast ==
- Karin Viard as Diane
- Laetitia Dosch as Manon
- Eye Haïdara as Awa
- Oulaya Amamra as Inès
- Pierre Deladonchamps
- Juliette Armanet

== Awards ==
It received the Audience Award for first and second-time directors at the 2026 Glasgow Film Festival.
