= Christopher Lew (cinematographer) =

Canadian cinematographer

Christopher Lew is a Canadian cinematographer. He is most noted for his work on the 2022 film Riceboy Sleeps, for which he received a Canadian Screen Award nomination for Best Cinematography at the 11th Canadian Screen Awards in 2023.

His other credits have included the films Tito, White Lie, The Archivists and Quickening.
