= Leyla Josephine =

- Born: Glasgow, UK
- Occupations: Poet, Screenwriter, Performer, Educator
- Writing career
- Period: 2014-present
- Genres: Poetry, spoken word,
- Subject: Feminism
- Notable work: Hopeless
- Website: leylajosephine.co.uk

Leyla Josephine (born 1991) is a poet, screenwriter, performer and educator from Glasgow, Scotland, currently living South Ayrshire. She has won a number of awards for her poetry and her spoken word show Hopeless received critical praise. In 2019, Leyla launched a new show, Daddy Drag.

== Poetry and Performance ==
Leyla Josephine writes on a wide range of issues. In 2014, her spoken word piece 'I Think She Was A She', exploring her own experience of abortion, was posted on the YouTube Channel of the now-defunct Guardian Witness, an off-shoot of The Guardian. The video gained international media attention, picked up by both The Huffington Post, and Upworthy. That same year, Leyla went on to win The UK National Poetry Slam, held at The Royal Albert Hall, and the Cultural Commonwealth Slam, held by spoken word, music and live lit events-series Rally & Broad.

In the spoken word show Hopeless, Leyla considers her own relationship with the news, which oftentimes causes her to feel depressed, ultimately reflecting on how powerful a tool hope is. The show debuted at The Edinburgh Fringe in 2017, and went on to be nominated for the Amnesty International Freedom of Expression Award and The Brighton Fringe New Voice Award. It was shortlisted for the Prague Fringe Festival Performance Award, and was described by theatre critic Lyn Gardner described the show as 'taking action in a world that seems beyond hope'. In the same year, Leyla won Loud Poets’ Grand Slam, and was a finalist for The Roundhouse Slam. In 2018, she placed second in The Scottish Poetry Slam, and was runner up in The Saboteur's Best Spoken Word Show 2018.

In 2019, Leyla launched a new show, Daddy Drag. The show explores memories of Leyla's father, centred around a conversation she shared with her mother about his role as a father/husband, and themes of fatherhood more generally. Simon Guy, writing for The Skinny, described Daddy Drag as 'moving, heart-wrenching and thoroughly enjoyable'.

== Education ==
In addition to writing poetry, Leyla spends the majority of her time leading poetry workshops. In this capacity, she has worked in a variety of settings, including schools, prisons, youth theatres, early years, mother groups, universities, with young carers, young people in care, both children and adults refugees and asylum seekers.

== Awards and honours ==
- 2014: The UK National Poetry Slam. Hammer and Tongue.
- 2014: Cultural Commonwealth Slam.
- 2017: Loud Poets' Grand Slam
- 2017: New Voice Award. Brighton Fringe Festival. (Shortlisted)
- 2017: Roundhouse Slam. Roundhouse. (Finalist)
- 2018: Best Spoken Word Show. Saboteur Awards. (Runner up)
- 2018: Scottish Poetry Slam. (Second Place)
- 2018: Performance Award. The Prague Fringe. (Shortlisted)

== Bibliography ==
- Leyla Josephine. Hopeless. (Glasgow: Speculative Books, 2018)
- 'I Think she Was a She', Annie Finch (ed.) Choice Words: Writers on Abortion. (Chicago, IL: Haymarket Books, 2020)
