= The Klabona Keepers =

- Directed by: Tamo Campos; Jasper Snow-Rosen
- Written by: Bertha Louie; Rita Louie; Rhoda Quock; Mary Quock; Tamo Campos; Jasper Snow-Rosen
- Produced by: Rhoda Quock
- Cinematography: Tamo Campos; Jasper Snow-Rosen
- Edited by: Tamo Campos; Jasper Snow-Rosen
- Production company: Beyond Boarding
- Release date: May 26, 2022 (Human Rights Watch)
- Running time: 69 minutes
- Country: Canada
- Language: English

The Klabona Keepers is a Canadian documentary film, directed by Tamo Campos and Jasper Snow-Rosen and released in 2022. The film is a profile of the Tahltan First Nation's successful activist campaign against industrial development that would have impacted the Sacred Headwaters, or Klabona, in northern British Columbia.

The film premiered on May 26, 2022 at the Toronto edition of the Human Rights Watch Film Festival. At the 2022 Vancouver International Film Festival, it was named the winner of the Audience Award for the Insights program.
