= Marianne Farley =

Canadian actress and director

- Born: Marianne Therien; Montreal, Quebec, Canada
- Occupation(s): Actress and director
- Years active: 1999–present
- Notable work: Imaginaerum, This Life, Vampire High, The Intruder, The Christmas Choir

Marianne Farley (born Marianne Therien in Montreal, Quebec) is a Canadian actress and director, best known for her roles as Gem Whitman in Imaginaerum, Nicole Breen in This Life, Dillan Vanderson in Vampire High and Stella and Nancy in The Intruder.

== Early life ==
Marianne Farley grew up in Quebec. She is bilingual (English and French). Her family was an artistic family that made a lot of music. So Farley started to sing from a very young age. When she was 19 she met a couple with their own record company. She worked together with them to release the single Histoire sans prénom and a music album. Several songs of hers made it into the top 10. She signed a record contract in France, where the album was never released. Later Farley wanted to become an actress. So she went to several workshops and learned acting.

== Career ==
In 1999, Farley played Stella and Nancy Brooke in The Intruder.

When Meghan Ory wanted to leave Vampire High in 2002 the producers needed to introduce another main character, Dillan Vanderson. Farley auditioned for the part and was cast after three auditions. Since the producers were searching for a girl who looked quirky Farley dyed her then blonde hair red. This look was inspired by the character Lola (Franka Potente) from the German film Run Lola Run. However, the series was canceled and so Farley remained only six episodes in the series.

In 2014, Farley could be seen as Anna in Uvanga, directed by Hélène Cousineau and Madeline Ivalu. From 2014 to 2015, Farley played Judith Laramée in the series Mémoires vives from Radio-Canada. In 2015, she could be seen as Julia in four episodes of the series Heroes Reborn. She plays Julia, the wife of Noah Bennet (Jack Coleman), one of the main figures of the series. From 2015 to 2016, she starred as Nicole Breen in the TV series This Life. Farley later said that she loved playing Nicole since she was a bit of everything. She was very emotional and tried to be in control in which she did not succeed much. Farley enjoyed the complexity of her character.

Farley has also worked as a producer, director and screenwriter. In 2015, Farley directed the short film Saccage. In 2017, she wrote and directed the short film Marguerite. This film has won 20 prestigious film awards, has been selected for over 70 film festivals, and was named as a shortlisted Academy Award for Best Live Action Short Film nominee at the 91st Academy Awards.

== Private life ==
Farley is a mother.

== Filmography ==
=== Film ===
Year	Title	Role	Notes
1999	The Intruder	Stella and Nancy Brooke	
2004	White Skin	Claire Lefrançois	
2008	Afterwards	Judy	
2008	The Christmas Choir	Marilyn	TV movie
2010	Snow and Ashes	Stef	
2012	Imaginaerum	Gem Whitman	
2013	Uvanga	Anna	
2015	Swept Under	Sheila Butler	
2016	9 (9, le film)	Vicky	
2017	Marguerite	—	Short film; director and writer
2020	Our Own (Les Nôtres)	Isabelle Jodoin	
2021	North of Albany (Au nord d'Albany)	—	Feature film directorial debut
2023	Tell Me Why These Things Are So Beautiful (Dis-moi pourquoi ces choses sont si belles)		

=== Television ===
Year	Title	Role	Notes
2002	Vampire High	Dillan Vanderson	6 episodes
2007–2009	Nos étés	Lison Belzile	5 episodes
2009	Le gentleman	Kim Leviel	8 episodes
2012	Les Rescapés	Alexandra	5 episodes
2014	30 vies	Lydia Anderson	8 episodes
2014-2015	Mémoires vives	Judith Laramée	6 episodes
2015	Heroes Reborn	Julia	4 episodes
2015-2016	This Life	Nicole Breen	19 episodes
2017	Bellevue	Jackie Edmonds	3 episodes

== See also ==
- List of female film and television directors
- List of LGBT-related films directed by women
