= Until Branches Bend =

- Directed by: Sophie Jarvis
- Written by: Sophie Jarvis
- Produced by: Tyler Hagan; Sara Blake; Magali Gillon-Krizaj; Michela Pini; Olga Lamontanara
- Starring: Grace Glowicki; Lochlyn Munro
- Cinematography: Jeremy Cox
- Edited by: Kane Stewart
- Music by: Kieran Jarvis
- Production companies: Experimental Forest Films; Ceroma Films; Cinédokké; Reign Films
- Distributed by: Photon Films
- Release date: September 10, 2022 (TIFF)
- Running time: 91 minutes
- Country: Canada
- Language: English

Until Branches Bend is a 2022 Canadian drama film written and directed by Sophie Jarvis. The film stars Grace Glowicki as Robin, a cannery worker who finds what she believes to be an invasive insect inside of a locally-grown peach, and must convince the community to take the threat seriously.

The cast also includes Alexandra Roberts, Quelemia Sparrow, Lochlyn Munro, Antoine DesRochers, Cole Sparrow-Crawford, Paul Kular, Janet Walmsley, Dave Kenneth MacKinnon, Michelle Brezinski, Charlie Hannah, Justin Lacey, Bhavkhandan Singh Rakhra, Michael Charrois, Leanne Merrett, Fabian Gujral, John Collins, Glenda Klassen and Damon Gregory.

The film entered production in summer 2021 in and around Penticton, British Columbia, under the working title Invasions.

The film premiered in the Discovery program at the 2022 Toronto International Film Festival on September 10, 2022.

== Critical response ==
On Rotten Tomatoes, the film holds an approval rating of 88% based on 16 reviews, with an average rating of 5.5/10. Courtney Small of That Shelf wrote that "Until Branches Bend is such an effective and unnerving film because Jarvis keeps everything grounded in a reality that is identifiable. One is always aware of the dangers Robin faces while navigating a community that is becoming increasingly more hostile towards her. While Robin’s safety remains top of mind, thanks to Glowicki’s sensationally layered performance, one can also understand the frustration that the locals have because of big corporations monopolizing and governing how farmers and crop pickers make a living. Jarvis’ film also captures the arrogance of capitalism from a generational wealth perspective as well."

== Awards ==
The film was longlisted for the Directors Guild of Canada's 2022 Jean-Marc Vallée DGC Discovery Award.

It won the award for Best British Columbia Film at the 2022 Vancouver International Film Festival.

It won the 'Prix De Soleure', the largest film prize in Switzerland, at the 2023 Solothurn Film Festival.
