= Tamo Campos =

Canadian snowboarder

Tamo Campos is a professional snowboarder and noted environmentalist from British Columbia, Canada.

He is the founder of the humanitarian group Beyond Boarding. In 2022, he directed the documentary film The Klabona Keepers, about the Tahltan First Nation's successful activist campaign against industrial development that would have impacted the Sacred Headwaters, or Klabona, in northern British Columbia.

Campos is the grandson of David Suzuki.
