= North of Normal =

2022 Canadian film directed by Carly Stone

- Film poster
- Directed by: Carly Stone
- Written by: Alexandra Weir
- Based on: North of Normal by Cea Sunrise Person
- Produced by: Jonathan Bronfman; Kyle Mann; Patrick Patterson; Joel Reilly
- Starring: Sarah Gadon; Amanda Fix; Robert Carlyle
- Cinematography: David Robert Jones
- Edited by: Orlee Buium
- Music by: Electric Youth
- Production companies: Independent Edge Films; JoBro Productions; Undisputed Pictures
- Distributed by: Elevation Pictures
- Release date: September 11, 2022 (TIFF)
- Running time: 90 minutes
- Country: Canada
- Language: English

North of Normal is a 2022 Canadian drama film, directed by Carly Stone. Based on the 2014 memoir of the same name by Cea Sunrise Person, the film centres on her unconventional childhood living in the wilderness as the daughter of a hippie mother.

The film's cast includes Sarah Gadon, Amanda Fix, Robert Carlyle, River Price-Maenpaa, James D'Arcy and Benedict Samuel.

The film was shot in 2021 in Northern Ontario, primarily in and around Sudbury, North Bay and Mattawa.

The film premiered in the Contemporary World Cinema program at the 2022 Toronto International Film Festival on September 11, 2022.

== Reception ==
On the review aggregator website Rotten Tomatoes, 100% of 6 critics' reviews are positive, with an average rating of 8/10.

Alexandra Weir received a Canadian Screen Award nomination for Best Adapted Screenplay at the 12th Canadian Screen Awards'.
