= Okay!: The ASD Band Film =

2022 Canadian documentary film

- Directed by: Mark Bone
- Written by: Greg Rosati
- Produced by: Gregory Rosati; Amalie Bruun
- Starring: The ASD Band
- Cinematography: Chris Romeike
- Edited by: Eva Dubovoy
- Music by: Maury LaFoy
- Production companies: Escarpment Films; Edelman; Jake's House
- Release date: April 29, 2022 (Hot Docs)
- Running time: 75 minutes
- Country: Canada
- Language: English

Okay!: The ASD Band Film is a Canadian documentary film, directed by Mark Bone and released in 2022. The film profiles the ASD Band, a Toronto-based group of musicians on the autism spectrum who released their debut EP, and played their first-ever live show in a public venue, in February 2022.

The band was first formed in 2019, after three of its four members, Ron Adea, Rawan Tuffaha and Jackson D. Begley, played on stage with Roger Hodgson at a World Autism Awareness Day concert benefiting the Toronto autism charity Jake's House. The fourth member, Spenser Murray, was invited to join afterward. Their first live show as a band had originally been planned for 2020, but after the COVID-19 pandemic forced its cancellation, they recorded several covers of classic pop and rock songs for release to music streaming platforms and began writing their own original songs.

The film premiered at the 2022 Hot Docs Canadian International Documentary Festival, where it was named the second-place winner of the Rogers Audience Award.

The band subsequently competed in the third season of Canada's Got Talent.

The band also appeared in The Kelly Clarkson Show.
