= Bones of Crows =

2022 Canadian drama film

- Film poster
- Directed by: Marie Clements
- Written by: Marie Clements
- Produced by: Marie Clements; Trish Dolman; Sam Grana; Christine Haebler
- Starring: Grace Dove
- Cinematography: Vince Arvidson
- Edited by: Maxime Lahaie
- Music by: Wayne Lavallee; Jesse Zubot
- Production companies: Ayasew Ooskana Pictures; Marie Clements Media; Screen Siren Pictures; Grana Productions
- Distributed by: Elevation Pictures
- Release date: September 10, 2022 (TIFF)
- Running time: 127 minutes
- Country: Canada
- Languages: English; Cree; Italian; French

Bones of Crows is a 2022 Canadian drama film, written, produced, and directed by Marie Clements and starring Grace Dove.

The film's cast also includes Summer Testawich and Carla-Rae as Aline Spears in childhood and older age, as well as Phillip Lewitski, Rémy Girard, Karine Vanasse, Michelle Thrush, Glen Gould, Gail Maurice, Cara Gee, Joshua Odjick, Jonathan Whitesell, Jules Arita Koostachin and Alanis Obomsawin in supporting roles.

The film premiered at the Toronto International Film Festival on September 10, 2022, before going into commercial release on June 2, 2023.

== Plot ==
A Cree woman survives the Indian residential school system to become a code talker for the Canadian Air Force during World War II.

== Cast ==
- Grace Dove as Aline Spears
- Phillip Lewitski as Adam Whallach
- Rémy Girard as Father Jacobs
- Karine Vanasse as Sister Ruth
- Alyssa Wapanatahk as Perseverance Spears
- Michelle Thrush as January Spears
- Glen Gould as Matthew Spears
- Gail Maurice as Older Taylor Whallach
- Carla-Rae as Older Aline Spears
- Cara Gee as Percy Whallach
- Jonathan Whitesell as Thomas Miller
- Patrick Garrow as Archbishop Thomas Miller
- Summer Testawich as Young Aline Spears
- Sierra Rose McRae as Young Perseverance Spears
- Ethan Evans as Preteen Johnnie
- Payne Merasty as Young Tye Spears
- Alanis Obomsawin as TRC Film Director
- Joshua Odjick as Jake Whallach

== Production ==
The film was shot partially at the Kamloops Indian Residential School. The suspicion of unmarked gravesites at the school began one week before shooting was to start, and the Tkʼemlúps te Secwépemc nation encouraged production to proceed because of the importance of getting residential school stories publicized and told.

== Television series ==
In 2021, CBC Television announced a five-hour limited series, which delves more deeply into Spears' extended family history over 100 years.

The television version premiered on September 20, 2023, on both CBC and APTN, with a Cree language version also airing on APTN beginning September 25.

== Reception ==
=== Critical response ===
On the review aggregator website Rotten Tomatoes, 95% of 19 critics' reviews are positive, with an average rating of 7.8/10.

Aparita Bhandari of The Globe and Mail wrote that "Although it’s a difficult film to watch, the loving way in which it depicts Indigenous families and their traditions, including a simple family dinner, offers a perspective often missing from news stories. The historical span from the late 1800s to present day also gives the film heft; the flashbacks used to reflect how memories carry intergenerational trauma are a poignant device. It’s a gift to watch the largely Indigenous cast bring to life a story that many of them have a personal connection to."

For Original Cin, Kim Hughes wrote that "Clements’ searing film — notably and beautifully shot on traditional territories and with its unanimously strong performances abetted by a brilliant cameo by filmmaker Alanis Obomsawin — is unsparing, as perhaps it must be. The horrors of residential schools should be perceived through a lens of revulsion and deep regret. Still, it is very hard to watch children being stomped on, tortured, molested, dying, and then to watch their adult selves funneling all that trauma into behaviour guaranteed to further compound their suffering and disenfranchisement. Equal parts indictment and historical score-setter, Bones of Crows is the film we deserve, its message of personal and spiritual resilience unmistakable. But enter knowing it is bleak beyond the most chilling slasher flick. Because it’s true."

=== Awards ===
The film received five Canadian Screen Award nominations at the 11th Canadian Screen Awards in 2023, for Best Original Screenplay (Clements), Best Original Song (Clements, Wayne Lavallee and Jesse Zubot for "You Are My Bones"), Best Makeup (Darci Jackson and Elizabeth McLeod), Best Hair (Charlene Dunn) and Best Visual Effects (Eric Gambini, Sarah Krusch Flanagan, Louis Mackall, Virginie Strub, Andrew Joe, Gabriel Chiang and Linus Burghardt).
