= Sophie Jarvis =

Canadian director

Sophie Jarvis is a Canadian film director and production designer. She is most noted for her work on the film Never Steady, Never Still, for which she and Liz Cairns received a Canadian Screen Award nomination for Best Art Direction/Production Design at the 6th Canadian Screen Awards in 2018.

Her debut feature film, Until Branches Bend, went into production in 2021 under the working title Invasions. The film premiered in the Discovery program at the 2022 Toronto International Film Festival.

Her other credits as a production designer have included the films Luk'Luk'I, The Body Remembers When the World Broke Open and Be Still. As a director she previously made a number of short films, including Margaret and the Dollhouse (2011), The Worst Day Ever (2012), 40 Candles (2014), Penny's for Tea (2015), Homesick (2016), Clean Your Room (2017), Medical Drama (2017) and Come to Your Senses (2020).

An alumna of Simon Fraser University, she is based in Vancouver, British Columbia.
