= Carly Stone =

Canadian film director

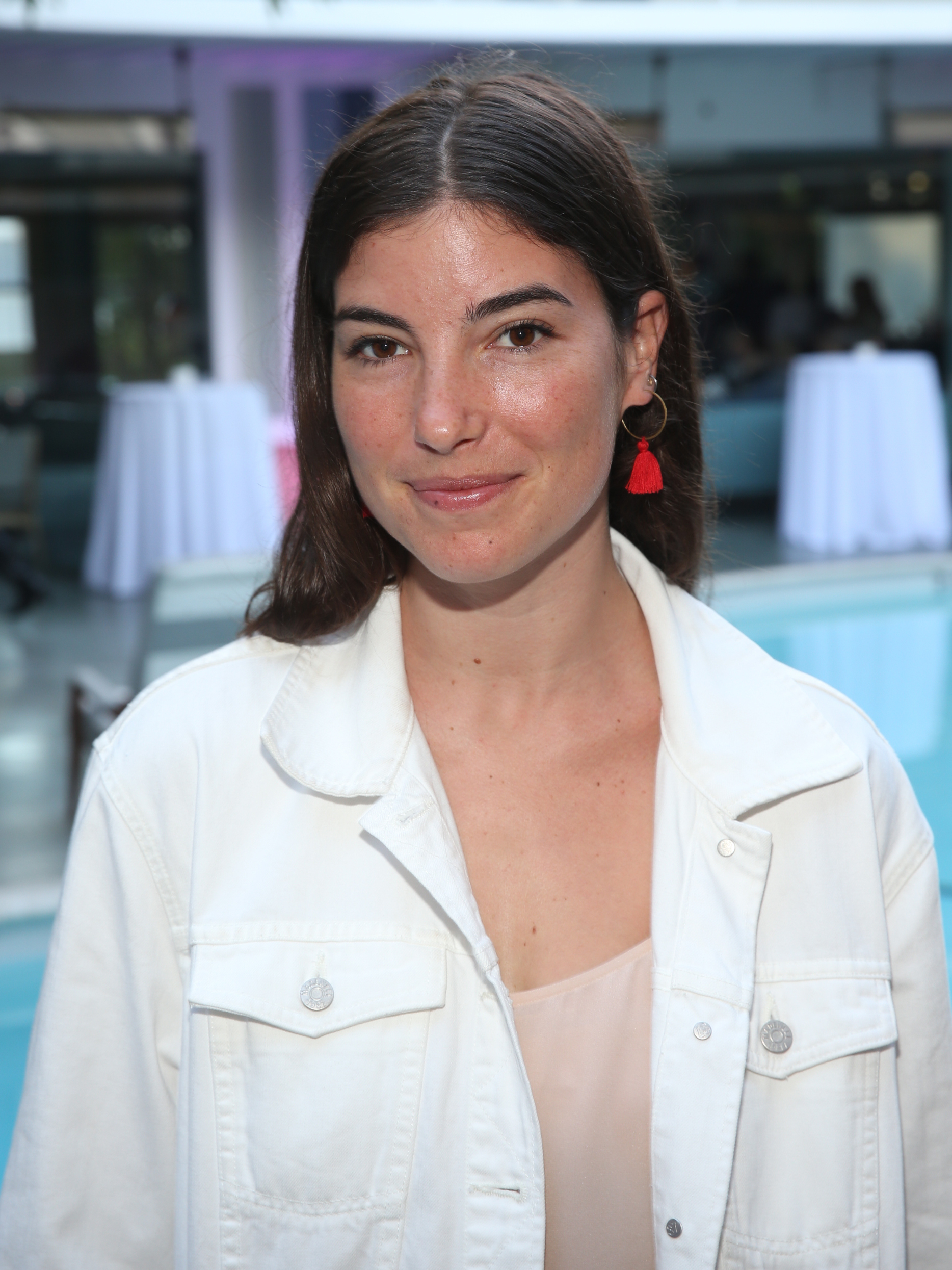
- Carly Stone at a Canadian Film Centre event in Los Angeles.
- Born: Toronto, Ontario, Canada
- Occupations: Dancer, writer, film director
- Known for: Winning the 2018 SXSW festival jury prize for best first feature film

Carly Stone is a Canadian film director and screenwriter.

== Personal life ==
Stone was born and raised in Toronto, by parents who were immigrants from South Africa. She graduated from the University of Western Ontario with a Bachelor of Arts majoring in English and Writing Studies in 2011.

She and her lawyer husband make their home in Toronto.

== Career ==
Prior to directing her first feature film, The New Romantic. She worked as a writer for the television series Kim's Convenience. The New Romantic premiered in March 2018, at the South by Southwest Festival.

Her second feature film, North of Normal, premiered at the 2022 Toronto International Film Festival.
