= Anthony Shim =

Canadian actor and filmmaker

- 심명보
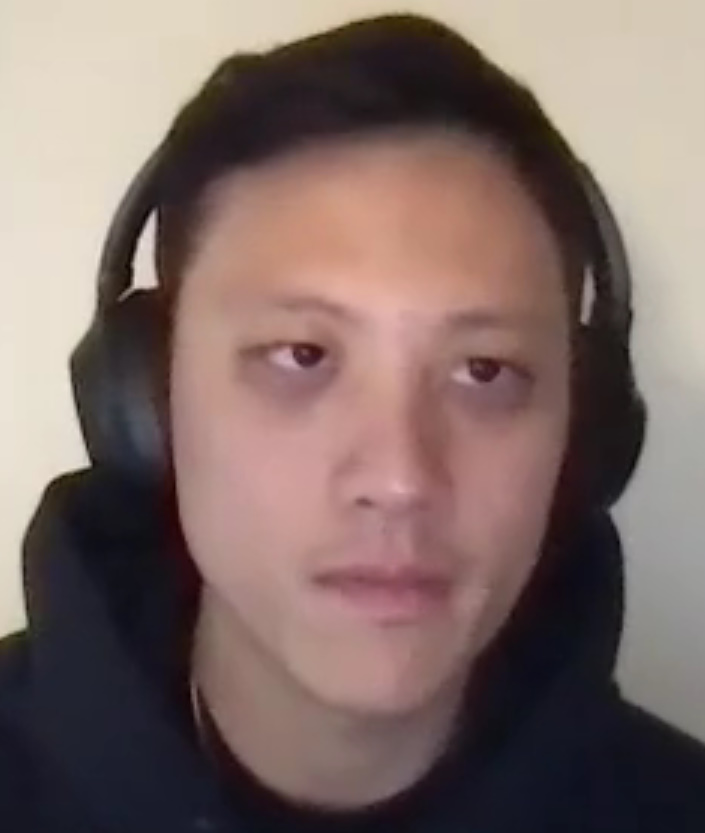
- Shim in 2023
- Born: South Korea
- Other names: Shim Myeong-bo
- Occupation(s): Actor; Film Director; Screenwriter
- Years active: 2006–present

Korean name
- Hangul: 심명보
- RR: Sim Myeongbo
- MR: Sim Myŏngbo

Anthony Shim is a Canadian actor and filmmaker based in Vancouver, British Columbia.

Born in Seoul, South Korea, he moved with his family to the Vancouver suburb of Coquitlam in childhood. He has had acting roles in both film and television, including in the 2013 film Evangeline and recurring supporting roles in the television series The Guard and 21 Thunder.

In 2010 he was one of the founders of the Vancouver-based Little Bastards theatre company, where his colleagues included actor and filmmaker Bryce Hodgson.

His full-length feature debut as a director, Daughter, premiered at the 2019 Vancouver International Film Festival. His second feature film, Riceboy Sleeps, premiered in the Platform Prize competition at the 2022 Toronto International Film Festival, and was named the winner of the Platform Prize. It was included in TIFF’s 2022 Canada’s Top Ten, and won the Toronto Film Critics Association’s Rogers Best Canadian Film Award, which comes with a $100,000 prize, considered the richest annual film prize in Canada.

He won the Canadian Screen Award for Best Original Screenplay at the 11th Canadian Screen Awards in 2023 for Riceboy Sleeps. Currently, Shim is the slated writer and director of an upcoming film adaptation of “Offerings” an acclaimed Korean coming-of-age novel. Anonymous Content and Anthology Studios are to produce.
