= 2020 Toronto International Film Festival =

45th edition of Canadian film festival

- Festival poster
- Opening film: American Utopia by Spike Lee
- Closing film: A Suitable Boy by Mira Nair
- Location: Toronto, Ontario, Canada
- Founded: 1976
- Awards: Nomadland (People's Choice Award)
- Festival date: September 10–21, 2020
- Website: tiff.net/tiff

TIFF chronology
- 2021 2019

The 2020 Toronto International Film Festival, the 45th event in the Toronto International Film Festival series, was held from September 10 to 21, 2020. Due to the COVID-19 pandemic in Toronto, the festival took place primarily on an online streaming platform, although limited in-person screenings still took place within the constraints of social distancing restrictions.

Officially the festival concluded on September 19, with the final film premieres and events taking place that day; however, due to the 48-hour rental period applying to film viewings on the online platform, the festival platform remained open until September 21 to honour tickets purchased on closing day.

== Planning ==
The festival's executive director Joana Vicente and artistic director Cameron Bailey spoke about the festival's plans in a video conference call launching the international We Are One: A Global Film Festival; Bailey also discussed some of the festival's plans in an interview on IndieWire's "Screen Talk" podcast. Plans included efforts to act as a "united platform" to screen films that had been slated to premiere at other cancelled festivals such as the 2020 Cannes Film Festival, and efforts to capitalize on the resurgence of drive-in theaters by staging some live screenings at drive-in venues. In a joint statement with the Venice Film Festival, the Telluride Film Festival and the New York Film Festival, which along with TIFF are generally considered the "big four" autumn film festivals that often compete with each other to land major film premieres in a normal year, the organizers of all four festivals committed to a spirit of collaboration and unity, designed "to serve the filmmakers, audiences, journalists and industry members who keep the film ecosystem thriving."

On June 24, organizers indicated that a smaller program of 50 films would be screened in a conventional manner, using social distancing strategies such as drive-in or outdoor screenings, over the first five days of the festival, and would then remain available on a dedicated streaming platform for the remainder of the festival. The digital platform was launched in July 2020 as the Digital TIFF Bell Lightbox, with a curated selection of past TIFF films available for short-term digital rental in the weeks leading up to the festival. The digital platform included both a professional option for international critics and industry, and a public option available only to Canadian viewers; ticket prices were the same regardless of whether the viewer was attending a physical screening or watching the film online. The industry platform also included an additional program of 30 films not part of the official public program, designed to act as a film market due to the pandemic-associated shutdown of international travel.

Venues for the festival included the TIFF Bell Lightbox, with social distancing strategies in place, as well as two outdoor screens at Ontario Place and one at Polson Pier. The Isabel Bader Theatre was initially announced as one of the screening venues, but was removed from the event calendar due to social distancing restrictions remaining in place at the University of Toronto. Initially, organizers announced that in-person film screenings would be "masks optional", but were criticized for creating a potential superspreader event as the social nature of the festival could increase the risk for COVID-19 transmission. The festival reversed the decision within 24 hours, citing a surge of new cases in Ontario, and made masks mandatory at the physical screenings.

With a smaller than normal program, both festival programmers and critics noted that films which have a tendency to be overlooked at a normal TIFF, such as documentaries and titles by emerging film directors in the Discovery program, could potentially have a better chance than usual of standing out and gaining attention.

In 2021, Bailey and Vicente indicated that although the 2020 festival saw reduced ticket sales compared to 2019, it was simultaneously the most successful event in the festival's entire history in terms of business activity and sales to film distributors, which provided the initial seed of the festival's subsequent decision to launch a full official film market starting in 2026.

== Ambassadors ==
Due to the unprecedented nature of the 2020 festival, and the fact that celebrities and filmmakers were largely not able to attend the festival in person, the festival announced a roster of 50 "TIFF Ambassadors", actors and filmmakers who helped to promote the festival through interactive digital experiences and events.

- Hiam Abbass
- Riz Ahmed
- Haifaa al-Mansour
- Shamier Anderson
- Darren Aronofsky
- Olivier Assayas
- Gael García Bernal
- Rachel Brosnahan
- Tantoo Cardinal
- Priyanka Chopra
- Derek Cianfrance
- Mark Cousins
- David Cronenberg
- Alfonso Cuarón
- Julie Delpy
- Claire Denis
- Ava DuVernay
- Atom Egoyan
- Sarah Gadon
- Isabelle Huppert
- Barry Jenkins
- Jia Zhang-ke
- Rian Johnson
- Anurag Kashyap
- Nicole Kidman
- Barbara Kopple
- Hirokazu Kore-eda
- Brie Larson
- Nadine Labaki
- Kasi Lemmons
- Tatiana Maslany
- Viggo Mortensen
- Carey Mulligan
- Genevieve Nnaji
- Alanis Obomsawin
- David Oyelowo
- Rosamund Pike
- Natalie Portman
- Zachary Quinto
- Jason Reitman
- Isabella Rossellini
- Martin Scorsese
- Albert Serra
- Denis Villeneuve
- Taika Waititi
- Lulu Wang
- Wim Wenders
- Olivia Wilde
- Donnie Yen
- Zhang Ziyi

== Awards ==
=== TIFF Tribute Awards ===
The festival presented the TIFF Tribute Awards, which were introduced in 2019 to honour actors and filmmakers for distinguished achievements over the course of their careers. Honorees in 2020 included Anthony Hopkins, Chloe Zhao, Mira Nair and Kate Winslet. For the first time, the ceremony was broadcast live by CTV Television Network, and was hosted by Tyrone Edwards and Chloe Wilde of CTV's eTalk.

=== Regular awards ===
Award winners were announced on September 20. The People's Choice Awards were still presented in all three categories; due to the reduced number of films in the Documentary and Midnight Madness streams, only winners were named for those awards rather than runners-up, although first and second runners-up were still named for the main People's Choice award. However, some of the juried awards were suspended, or presented in a different form than usual; notably, the Platform Prize was not presented as no films were named to the Platform program, and the award for Best Canadian First Feature Film was not presented due to the limited number of eligible films. Canadian singer-songwriter Shawn Mendes, in association with TIFF, announced the creation of the Shawn Mendes Foundation Changemaker Award, which awards filmmakers who create films with a social message.

Award	Film	Director
People's Choice Award	Nomadland	Chloé Zhao
People's Choice Award, First Runner Up	One Night in Miami...	Regina King
People's Choice Award, Second Runner Up	Beans	Tracey Deer
People's Choice Award: Documentaries	Inconvenient Indian	Michelle Latimer
People's Choice Award: Midnight Madness	Shadow in the Cloud	Roseanne Liang
Best Canadian Feature Film	Inconvenient Indian	Michelle Latimer
Best Canadian Feature Film, Honorable Mention	Fauna	Nicolás Pereda
Best Canadian Short Film	Benjamin, Benny, Ben	Paul Shkordoff
Best International Short Film	Dustin	Naïla Guiguet
FIPRESCI Award	Beginning	Dea Kulumbegashvili
NETPAC Award	Gaza mon amour	Tarzan and Arab Nasser
Amplify Voices	The Disciple	Chaitanya Tamhane
Amplify Voices	Night of the Kings	Philippe Lacôte
Amplify Voices, Honorable Mention	Downstream to Kinshasa	Dieudo Hamadi
Changemaker Award	Black Bodies	Kelly Fyffe-Marshall
Share Her Journey	Sing Me a Lullaby	Tiffany Hsiung

== Programme ==
American Utopia by Spike Lee was announced as the festival's opening film. The festival also screened Chloé Zhao's film Nomadland, as part of a special arrangement which saw the film open at TIFF, NYFF and Venice all on the same day.

The first batch of films slated for the festival was announced on June 24, 2020, and more were announced on July 30. The final announcement of short films and special events took place on August 25.

=== Gala presentations ===
English title	Original title	Director(s)	Production country
Ammonite		Francis Lee	United Kingdom, Australia
Bruised		Halle Berry	United States, United Kingdom
Concrete Cowboy		Ricky Staub	United States
David Byrne’s American Utopia		Spike Lee	United States
Good Joe Bell		Reinaldo Marcus Green	United States
I Care a Lot		J Blakeson	United States
Nomadland		Chloé Zhao	United States
One Night in Miami...		Regina King	United States
Pieces of a Woman		Kornél Mundruczó	Canada, Hungary, United States

=== Special presentations ===
English title	Original title	Director(s)	Production country
Another Round	Druk	Thomas Vinterberg	Denmark, Netherlands, Sweden
The Disciple		Chaitanya Tamhane	India
Falling		Viggo Mortensen	Canada, United Kingdom
The Father		Florian Zeller	France, United Kingdom
Penguin Bloom		Glendyn Ivin	Australia, United States
Shawn Mendes: In Wonder		Grant Singer	United States
Summer of 85	Été 85	François Ozon	France, Belgium
True Mothers	朝が来る, Asa ga Kuru	Naomi Kawase	Japan

=== Contemporary World Cinema ===
English title	Original title	Director(s)	Production country
Bandar Band		Manijeh Hekmat	Iran
New Order	Nuevo orden	Michel Franco	Mexico, France
Night of the Kings	La Nuit des rois	Philippe Lacôte	Canada, Côte d'Ivoire, France, Senegal
Preparations to Be Together for an Unknown Period of Time	Felkészülés meghatározatlan ideig tartó együttlétre	Lili Horvát	Hungary
Quo Vadis, Aida?		Jasmila Žbanić	Bosnia
Under the Open Sky	すばらしき世界, Subarashiki Sekai	Miwa Nishikawa	Japan

=== Masters ===
English title	Original title	Director(s)	Production country
Notturno		Gianfranco Rosi	Italy, France, Germany

=== TIFF Docs ===
English title	Original title	Director(s)	Production country
76 Days		Hao Wu, Weixi Chen, Anonymous	China, United States
City Hall		Frederick Wiseman	United States
Enemies of the State		Sonia Kennebeck	United States
Fireball: Visitors from Darker Worlds		Werner Herzog, Clive Oppenheimer	United States
Inconvenient Indian		Michelle Latimer	Canada
Lift Like a Girl	Ash Ya Captain	Mayye Zayed	Egypt, Denmark, Germany
MLK/FBI		Sam Pollard	United States
The New Corporation: The Unfortunately Necessary Sequel		Joel Bakan, Jennifer Abbott	Canada
No Ordinary Man		Aisling Chin-Yee, Chase Joynt	Canada

=== Discovery ===
English title	Original title	Director(s)	Production country
180° Rule	خط فرضی, Khate Farzi	Farnoosh Samadi	Iran
Beans		Tracey Deer	Canada
Beginning	Dasatskisi	Dea Kulumbegashvili	Georgia, France
The Best Is Yet to Come	Bu Zhi Bu Xiu	Wang Jing	China
Gaza mon amour		Tarzan and Arab Nasser	Palestine, France, Germany, Portugal, Qatar
Limbo		Ben Sharrock	United Kingdom
Memory House	Casa de Antiguidades	João Paulo Miranda Maria	Brazil, France
Shiva Baby		Emma Seligman	Canada, United States
Spring Blossom	Seize printemps	Suzanne Lindon	France
Wildfire		Cathy Brady	Ireland, United Kingdom

=== Short Cuts ===
English title	Original title	Director(s)	Production country
4 North A		Jordan Canning, Howie Shia	Canada
Aniksha		Vincent Toi	Canada, Mauritius
The Archivists		Igor Drljaca	Canada
As Spring Comes	Comme la neige au printemps	Marie-Ève Juste	Canada
Benjamin, Benny, Ben		Paul Shkordoff	Canada
Black Bodies		Kelly Fyffe-Marshall	Canada
David		Zach Woods	United States
Drought		Remi Itani	Lebanon
Dustin		Naïla Guiguet	France
Every Day's Like This		Lev Lewis	Canada
Found Me		David Findlay	Canada
The Game	Das Spiel	Roman Hodel	Switzerland
History of Civilization		Zhannat Alshanova	Kazakhstan
In Sudden Darkness		Tayler Montague	United States
Loose Fish		Francisco Canton, Pato Martinez	Argentina, Morocco, United States
Marlon Brando		Vincent Tilanus	Netherlands
Mountain Cat	Shiluus	Lkhagvadulam Purev-Ochir	Mongolia
Navozande, the Musician	Navozande, le musicien	Reza Riahi	France
O, Black Hole!		Renee Zhan	United Kingdom
Our Hearts Beat Like War		Elinor Nechemya	Israel
Pilar		Yngwie Boley, Diana van Houten, J.J. Epping	Netherlands, Belgium
Point and Line to Plane		Sofia Bohdanowicz	Canada
The Price of Cheap Rent		Amina Sutton, Maya Tanaka	United States
RKLSS		Tank Standing Buffalo	Canada
Rules for Werewolves		Jeremy Schaulin-Rioux	Canada
Scars		Alex Anna	Canada
Shooting Star	Comme une comète	Ariane Louis-Seize	Canada
Sing Me a Lullaby		Tiffany Hsiung	Canada
Sinking Ship	La Naufrage	Sasha Leigh Henry	Canada
Stephanie		Leonardo van Dijl	Belgium
Still Processing		Sophy Romvari	Canada
Strong Son		Ian Bawa	Canada
Succor		Hannah Cheesman	Canada
Sër Bi		Moly Kane	France, Senegal
Tie	Elo	Alexandra Ramires	Portugal

=== Midnight Madness ===
English title	Original title	Director(s)	Production country
Get the Hell Out	逃出立法院	I-Fan Wang	Taiwan
Shadow in the Cloud		Roseanne Liang	New Zealand, United States
Violation		Madeleine Sims-Fewer, Dusty Mancinelli	Canada

=== Planet Africa ===
English title	Original title	Director(s)	Production country
40 Years a Prisoner		Tommy Oliver	United States
Akilla's Escape		Charles Officer	Canada, United States
Downstream to Kinshasa	En route pour le milliard	Dieudo Hamadi	DR Congo
The Way I See It		Dawn Porter	United States

=== Primetime ===
English title	Original title	Director(s)	Production country
A Suitable Boy		Mira Nair	United Kingdom
The Third Day		Felix Barrett, Dennis Kelly	United Kingdom, United States
Trickster		Michelle Latimer	Canada

=== Wavelengths ===
English title	Original title	Director(s)	Production country
Fauna	Flora y fauna	Nicolás Pereda	Canada, Mexico
The Inheritance		Ephraim Asili	United States

=== Special Events ===
English title	Original title	Director(s)	Production country
The Boy from Medellin		Matthew Heineman	United States, Colombia
The Truffle Hunters		Michael Dweck, Gregory Kershaw	Greece, Italy, United States
Underplayed also featuring live DJ set by Rezz		Stacey Lee	Canada
The Water Man		David Oyelowo	United States
Wolfwalkers		Tomm Moore, Ross Stewart	Ireland, Luxembourg, France

=== Industry Selects ===
The Industry Selects program was a film market for films seeking commercial distribution. Due to the pandemic, which prevented members of the North American film industry from travelling to international film festivals where many of the following films were screened, they were available on the festival's industry platform, but not on the commercial platform for the general public. Introduced at the time as a temporary measure due to the pandemic, it was converted into a permanent part of the TIFF program in 2022, and became the nucleus of the festival's plans to launch a full film market at the 2026 Toronto International Film Festival.

English title	Original title	Director(s)	Production country
After Love		Aleem Khan	France, United Kingdom
And Tomorrow the Entire World	Und morgen die ganze Welt	Julia Von Heinz	France, Germany
Apples	Μήλα	Christos Nikou	Greece, Poland, Slovenia
Baby Done		Curtis Vowell	New Zealand
Enforcement	Shorta	Anders Ølholm, Frederik Louis Hviid	Denmark
Falling for Figaro		Ben Lewin	Australia, United Kingdom
The Garden	Gullregn	Ragnar Bragason	Iceland, Poland
A Good Man		Marie-Castille Mention-Schaar	France
Here We Are	הנה אנחנו	Nir Bergman	Israel, Italy
Holler		Nicole Riegel	United States
In Between Dying	Səpələnmiş ölümlər arasında	Hilal Baydarov	Azerbaijan, Mexico, United States
Karnawal		Juan Pablo Félix	Argentina, Bolivia, Brazil, Chile, Mexico, Norway
The Kid Detective		Evan Morgan	Canada
Kill It and Leave This Town	Zabij to i wyjedź z tego miasta	Mariusz Wilczyński	Poland
La Verónica		Leonardo Medel	Chile
Like a House on Fire		Jesse Noah Klein	Canada
Lovers	Amants	Nicole Garcia	France
Magic Mountains		Urszula Antoniak	Netherlands
Monday		Argyris Papadimitropoulos	Greece, United Kingdom, United States
The Monopoly of Violence		David Dufresne	France
My Best Part	Garçon chiffon	Nicolas Maury	France
My Heart Goes Boom!	Explota Explota	Nacho Álvarez	Spain
My Name Is Francesco Totti		Alex Infascelli	Italy
Saint-Narcisse		Bruce LaBruce	Canada
Should the Wind Drop	Si le vent tombe	Nora Martirosyan	Armenia, Belgium, France
Simple Passion	Passion simple	Danielle Arbid	Belgium, France
Sweat		Magnus von Horn	Poland, Sweden
The Ties	Lacci	Daniele Luchetti	Italy
Tove		Zaida Bergroth	Finland
The Translator	Le Traducteur	Rana Kazkaz, Anas Khalaf	France, Switzerland, Syria, Belgium, Qatar, United States

== Canada's Top Ten ==
TIFF's annual Canada's Top Ten list, its national critics and festival programmers poll of the ten best feature and short films of the year, was released on December 9, 2020.

=== Feature films ===
- Beans — Tracey Deer
- Fauna — Nicolás Pereda
- Funny Boy — Deepa Mehta
- Inconvenient Indian — Michelle Latimer
- Judy Versus Capitalism — Mike Hoolboom
- The Kid Detective — Evan Morgan
- Nadia, Butterfly — Pascal Plante
- The Nest — Sean Durkin
- No Ordinary Man — Chase Joynt, Aisling Chin-Yee
- Possessor — Brandon Cronenberg

=== Short films ===
- Aniksha — Vincent Toi
- The Archivists — Igor Drljaca
- Benjamin, Benny, Ben — Paul Shkordoff
- Black Bodies — Kelly Fyffe-Marshall
- êmîcêtôcêt: Many Bloodlines — Theola Ross
- Foam — Omar Elhamy
- How to Be At Home — Andrea Dorfman
- Scars — Alex Anna
- Sing Me a Lullaby — Tiffany Hsiung
- Stump the Guesser — Guy Maddin, Evan Johnson, Galen Johnson
