= Jordan Oram =

Canadian cinematographer

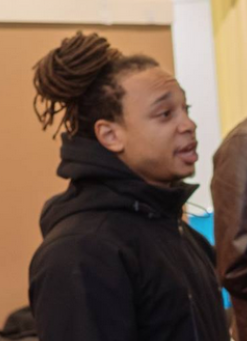
- Oram in 2017
- Occupation: Cinematographer
- Website: www.jordanoramdp.com

Jordan Oram is a Canadian cinematographer who best known for his work on Drake's music videos "God's Plan", "In My Feelings" and "Life Is Good" and also feature films Spiral and When Morning Comes. In 2021, Oram released a plantable book titled The Journeyman. His work in the CBC series The Porter earned him a Canadian Screen Award for Photography in a drama program or series at the 11th Canadian Screen Awards in 2023.

== Career ==
Oram started shooting music videos and short films with Ron Dias/Director and Kelly Fyffe-Marshall as early as 2011. Oram said that he manifested working on the biggest music video for Drake and ironically his breakthrough was when he worked on Drake's music video "God's Plan" which was directed by Karena Evans. The music video caught the eye of director Darren Lynn Bousman from the Saw franchise and hired him for the Saw spin off Spiral. Oram was the director of photography on CBC's The Porter which was later acquired by BET. Oram won the Prism Prize Special Achievement Award in 2021.

== Filmography ==
=== Music videos ===
List of crew roles in music videos
Year	Title and Artist	Role	Notes	Refs
2017	"Mumble Rap" by Belly	Director of Photography		
2017	"Run This" by Plaza	Director of Photography		
2017	"You for You" by Anders	Director of Photography		
2017	"The Come Down Is Real Too" by Belly	Director of Photography		
2018	"Summer in November" by SiR	Director of Photography		
2018	"God's Plan" by Drake	Director of Photography		
2018	"Blue" by Lolo Zouaï	Director of Photography		
2018	"D'Evils" by SiR	Director of Photography		
2018	"I'm Upset" by Drake	Director of Photography		
2018	"R.A.N" by Miguel	Director of Photography	music video to promote Superfly film	
2018	"In My Feelings" by Drake	2nd unit DOP		
2018	"Tap Out" by Jay Rock ft. Jeremih	Director of Photography		
2019	"Everyday Life" by Coldplay	Director of Photography		
2020	"Life Is Good" by Future feat. Drake	Director of Photography		
2020	"What If I Told You That I Love You" by Ali Gatie	Director of Photography		
2020	"Don't Waste My Time" by Usher ft. Ella Mai			
2020	"90 BPM" by Sean Leon	Director of Photography		

=== Feature film ===
Year	Title	Crew role	Notes	Refs
2021	Spiral	Director of Photography		
2022	When Morning Comes	Cinematography		
2024	Village Keeper	Cinematographer		

=== Television ===
Year	Title	Crew role	Notes	Refs
2019	Detention Adventure	Director of Photography		
2022	The Porter	Director of Photography		
