= Alexandra Johnes =

American documentary producer (born 1976)

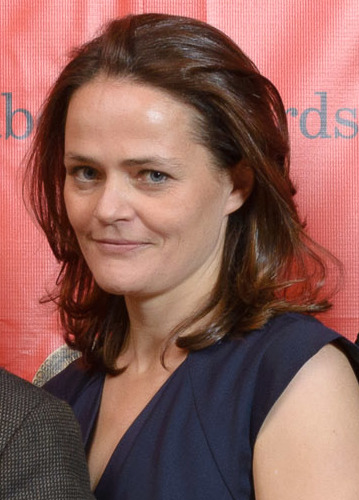
- Alexandra Johnes at the 73rd Annual Peabody Awards in 2014
- Occupations: Producer (film), actor
- Years active: 1987–present

Alexandra Johnes (born December 3, 1976) is an American documentary film producer and former actress. As a producer, Johnes is known for films including The Square, Gonzo: The Life and Work of Dr. Hunter S. Thompson, and Doubletime. She has worked as a producer with various directors, including Alex Gibney, Eugene Jarecki and Jehane Noujaim. In 2013, Johnes received a Primetime Emmy Award for producing Mea Maxima Culpa: Silence in the House of God. During her acting career, Johnes' film credits include starring roles as the Childlike Empress in The NeverEnding Story II: The Next Chapter, and Phoebe in Zelly and Me, alongside Isabella Rossellini and David Lynch, as well as guest appearances on Buffy the Vampire Slayer and Sabrina, the Teenage Witch.

== Biography ==
Johnes graduated with a BFA from the Tisch School of the Arts at New York University (NYU). From 2007 through 2012, Johnes ran Jigsaw Productions for Academy Award-winning director Alex Gibney, managing aspects of development and production. In 2012, Johnes received a Transatlantic Partnership (TAP) Producing Fellowship from the Independent Filmmaker Project.

Johnes leads the production company Special Projects.

Johnes' sister Stephanie Johnes also works in film. Stephanie directed and filmed the 2007 documentary Doubletime, on which Alexandra worked as a producer.

== Filmography ==
=== Producer ===
Year	Title	Role	Notes
2017	The Mars Generation	Executive producer	
2016	Holy Hell	Producer	
2015	Frame by Frame	Executive producer	
2015	The Witch	Executive producer	
2013	The Square	Co-producer/Executive producer	
2012	The House I Live In	Consulting producer	
2012	Mea Maxima Culpa: Silence in the House of God	Producer	
2012	Rafea: Solar Mama	Supervising producer	
2011	Magic Trip: Ken Kesey's Search for a Kool Place	Producer	
2011	The Last Gladiators	Co-producer	
2011	Reagan	Consulting producer	
2010	Casino Jack and the United States of Money	Co-producer	
2010	Client 9: The Rise and Fall of Eliot Spitzer	Production executive	
2010	Freakonomics: The Movie	Segment producer	
2010	My Trip to Al-Qaeda	Producer	
2009	Money-Driven Medicine	Production executive	
2008	Gonzo: The Life and Work of Dr. Hunter S. Thompson	Production executive	
2007	Doubletime	Producer, Sound recordist	

=== Actor ===
Year	Title	Role	Notes
1988	Zelly and Me	Phoebe	
1990	The NeverEnding Story II: The Next Chapter	Childlike Empress	
1997	Sabrina, the Teenage Witch	Hillary	episode: Hilda and Zelda: the Teenage Years (S1E15)
1997	Buffy the Vampire Slayer	Sheila Martini	episode: School Hard (S2E3)

== Awards and nominations ==
Year	Award	Category	Title of work	Result
2013	Primetime Emmy Award	Exceptional Merit in Documentary Filmmaking	Mea Maxima Culpa: Silence in the House of God	Won
2017	Gerald Loeb Award	Audio	"Dov Charney’s American Dream"	Won
