= Jason Logan =

Canadian illustrator & writer

- Born: Toronto, Ontario
- Occupations: Illustrator, writer, inkmaker

Jason Logan is an inkmaker, illustrator, writer, graphic designer, and art director based in Toronto, Ontario, Canada. His illustrations have appeared in numerous publications including The New York Times, The Walrus, and The Globe and Mail. His first book, If We Ever Break Up, This Is My Book has been translated into seven languages. Logan has also created hand-lettering and designed book covers for Coach House Books and HarperCollins.

He is the founder of Toronto Ink Company, which makes artist's inks made from foraged and found materials. The documentary The Colour of Ink follows him as he travels and makes ink from natural materials, and shows how his inks are used by artists, writers, and calligraphers including Kōji Kakinuma, Liana Finck, Soraya Syed, Yuri Shimojo, Corey Bulpitt, Roxx and Margaret Atwood.

Logan lives in Toronto with his wife, novelist Heidi Sopinka, and their children.

== Works ==
Year	Title	Publisher
2005	If We Ever Break Up, This Is My Book	Simon & Schuster
2007	iGeneration	Penguin Canada
2010	Festus	J&L Books
2018	Make Ink:A Forager's Guide to Natural Inkmaking	Abrams Books
