= Municipal Relaxation Module =

2022 Canadian short comedy-drama film

- Directed by: Matthew Rankin
- Written by: Matthew Rankin
- Produced by: Matthew Rankin; Sacha Ratcliffe
- Starring: Maurice Krank; Trevor Anderson
- Cinematography: Matthew Rankin
- Edited by: Matthew Rankin
- Distributed by: La Distributrice de films
- Release date: September 9, 2022 (TIFF)
- Running time: 6 minutes
- Country: Canada
- Language: English

Municipal Relaxation Module is a Canadian short satirical comedy-drama film, directed by Matthew Rankin and released in 2022. The film stars Maurice Krank as Ken, a man in Winnipeg who has an idea to improve a park bench but gets lost in the maze of city bureaucracy when he tries to suggest it, becoming increasingly frustrated until his only choice left for calming down is to sit on the very park bench he was trying to change.

The film premiered at the 2022 Toronto International Film Festival.

It was named to TIFF's annual year-end Canada's Top Ten list for 2022.

== Awards ==
The film was the winner of the Prix SPIRA at the 2022 Abitibi-Témiscamingue International Film Festival.
