= Toronto International Film Festival Changemaker Award =

Canadian film award

The Changemaker Award is an annual film award presented by the Toronto International Film Festival in conjunction with the Shawn Mendes Foundation. First presented at the 2020 Toronto International Film Festival, the award is presented to honour films with a strong social message, with the winner selected by the organizing committee for the TIFF Next Wave youth film festival.

It was open to both feature and short films.

The award was not presented at the 2024 Toronto International Film Festival.

== Winners ==
Year	Film	Director	Ref
2020	Black Bodies	Kelly Fyffe-Marshall	
2021	Scarborough	Shasha Nakhai, Rich Williamson	
2022	Something You Said Last Night	Luis De Filippis	
2023	We Grown Now	Minhal Baig	
