= Sing Me a Lullaby =

2020 Canadian short documentary film

- Film poster
- Directed by: Tiffany Hsiung
- Written by: Tiffany Hsiung
- Produced by: Tiffany Hsiung
- Cinematography: Tiffany Hsiung; Eugene Weis; Jason Lee Wong
- Edited by: Ricardo Acosta; Xi Feng
- Music by: Tom Third
- Production company: Golden Nugget Productions
- Release date: September 15, 2020 (TIFF)
- Running time: 29 minutes
- Country: Canada
- Language: English

Sing Me a Lullaby is a Canadian short documentary film, directed by Tiffany Hsiung and released in 2020. The film documents Hsiung's efforts to locate and reconnect with her mother's birth family in Taiwan, following her mother's separation from her parents and adoption in childhood.

The film premiered at the 2020 Toronto International Film Festival, where it was named winner of the Share Her Journey award. The film was subsequently also announced as a nominee for Best Short Film at the 2020 Directors Guild of Canada awards.

The film was named to TIFF's year-end Canada's Top Ten list for short films. The film won the Canadian Screen Award for Best Short Documentary at the 9th Canadian Screen Awards in 2021.
