= Soft (film) =

2022 Canadian film directed by Joseph Amenta

- Film poster
- Directed by: Joseph Amenta
- Written by: Joseph Amenta
- Produced by: Alexandra Roberts; Danny Sedore
- Starring: Matteus Lunot; Harlow Joy; Zion Matheson
- Cinematography: Liam Higgins
- Edited by: Alexander Farah
- Music by: Casey MQ; Skyshaker
- Production company: Push Pictures
- Release dates: September 9, 2022 (TIFF); April 7, 2023 (Canada)
- Running time: 87 minutes
- Country: Canada
- Languages: English; Tagalog

Soft is a 2022 Canadian drama film, written and directed by Joseph Amenta. Amenta's feature debut, the film centres on three young queer friends in Toronto who are revelling in the freedom of their summer break from school, until a missing persons investigation draws them back into reality.

The cast includes Matteus Lunot, Harlow Joy, Zion Matheson, Miyoko Anderson, Krista Morin, Trevor Hayes, David Lafontaine, Matt Willis, Joy Castro, Sochi Fried, Jordan Shore, Peter Bou-Ghannam, River Price-Maenpaa and Jay Yoo.

The film's title was originally announced as Pussy, but was changed to Soft in advance of the premiere. It premiered in the Discovery programme at the 2022 Toronto International Film Festival on September 9, 2022.
