= Michèle Maheux =

Canadian film industry executive

Michèle Maheux is a Canadian film industry executive, who served as the executive director and chief operating officer of the Toronto International Film Festival from 1998 to 2019.

Formerly associated with the Canadian Film Institute, she worked a publicist for Cineplex Entertainment before joining TIFF in 1989 as a publicist and communications director; she was then promoted to managing director of TIFF in 1998. Her most noted achievements with the organization included the launch of the Cinematheque Ontario program of year-round film screenings, and the creation of the TIFF Bell Lightbox.

She announced her retirement from TIFF in summer 2018, and was succeeded the following year by Joana Vicente.

In 2019 she was named the winner of the Toronto Film Critics Association's annual Clyde Gilmour Award for lifetime achievement. She selected filmmaker Lina Rodriguez as the recipient of the award's "pay-it-forward" grant to an emerging filmmaker.
