= Scars (2020 film) =

2020 Canadian film directed by Alex Anna

- Directed by: Alex Anna
- Produced by: Kélyna N. Lauzier
- Narrated by: Alex Anna
- Cinematography: Marilee Goulet
- Edited by: Valérie Tremblay
- Music by: Victor Novak
- Distributed by: Spira
- Release date: September 15, 2020 (TIFF)
- Running time: 10 minutes
- Country: Canada
- Language: French

Scars is a Canadian short documentary film, directed by Alex Anna and released in 2020. Blending live action with animation, the film explores Anna's own mental health history by documenting the scars resulting from her own history of self-harm.

The film premiered at the 2020 Toronto International Film Festival.

The film was named to TIFF's year-end Canada's Top Ten list for short films.
