= Once Upon a Time in Gaza =

2025 film by the Nasser Brothers

- Festival promotional poster
- Directed by: Tarzan and Arab Nasser
- Written by: Tarzan and Arab Nasser
- Produced by: Rashid Abdelhamid; Faris Halaseh; Rani Massalha; Marie Legrand; Amanda Turnbull
- Starring: Issaq Elias; Nader Abd Alhay; Ramzi Maqdisi; Majd Eid
- Production companies: Les Films du Tambour; Made in Palestine Project; Red Balloon Films; Rise Studios; Riva Filmproduktion; Ukbar Filmes
- Distributed by: Sophie Dulac Distribution (France)
- Release dates: 19 May 2025 (Cannes); 25 June 2025 (France)
- Running time: 87 minutes
- Countries: Palestine; United Arab Emirates; France; Portugal; Germany; United Kingdom; Jordan
- Language: Arabic

Once Upon a Time in Gaza is a 2025 Palestinian film written and directed by Tarzan and Arab Nasser. Starring Issaq Elias, Nader Abd Alhay, Ramzi Maqdisi and Majd Eid. Set in Hamas-controlled Gaza, Palestine, it follows Yahya (Nader Abd Alhay) and Ossama (Issa Elias), who have to deal with a local, corrupt policeman.

The film had its world premiere in the Un Certain Regard section of the 78th Cannes Film Festival on 19 May 2025, where it won the section's Best Director prize. It was theatrically released in France on 25 June by Sophie Dulac Distribution.

== Plot ==
The film begins with a 2025 quote from Donald Trump about Gaza becoming “the Riviera of the Middle East”. However the action starts in 2007; the death of a Hamas militant is marked by a funeral parade in a dilapidated Gaza City under Israeli blockade. Nearby, Osama is a falafel shop owner with a sideline job of selling illicit prescription painkillers. He is reluctantly assisted by Yahya, an unassuming young man who works in the shop. Osama is pressured by crooked cop Abou Sami to become his informant, which he resists, leading to a tragic aftermath.

Two years latter, Yahya is approached by a Palestinian filmmaker because he looks exactly like the militant whose funeral parade was held two years earlier. He accepts the part in a propaganda action movie sponsored by Gaza’s Ministry of Culture. Without a budget for special effects, the director uses real guns and ammunition on set, and Yahya begins to take on the persona of the militant.

== Cast ==
- Issaq Elias as the Director
- Nader Abd Alhay as Yahya
- Ramzi Maqdisi as Abou Sami
- Majd Eid as Osama
- Omar Al-joukhi as Israeli soldier

== Production ==
The Nasser Brothers were inspired to make a film about their hometown, Gaza, which they had left in 2012. Many of their previous films have similarly tackled depictions of Gaza, and they stated that Once Upon a Time in Gaza's release in the wake of October 7 attacks was "pure coincidence but timely," as they had been working on the film for a decade. In particular, the Nasser Brothers said that film's title was originally "meant to capture the rhythm of Gaza at the time" but took on a more sinister significance following Israel's destruction caused by the Gaza war.

The Nasser Brothers began writing the film's screenplay in 2015 with the idea of situating Gaza within the sensibility of a Western film. They finished writing it shortly before October 7, 2023 but found, months later, that they needed to revisit it.

=== Filming ===
The film was then shot in Jordan. It was produced by the French production company Les Films du Tambour and many other co-producers around the world, such as the Made in Palestine Project.

== Release ==
The film was selected for the 2025 Cannes Film Festival, for the Un Certain Regard category, and was one of the nine Arab films to be screened. It premiered there on May 19. MAD Solutions has distribution rights in the Middle East and North Africa, and Dulac Distribution has distribution rights in France.

Once Upon a Time in Gaza had a special screening at the 31st Sarajevo Film Festival in the Special Screening - DFI Presents section in August 2025. It will be screened in the 'Best of 2025' section of the 20th Rome Film Festival in October 2025.

== Critical reception ==
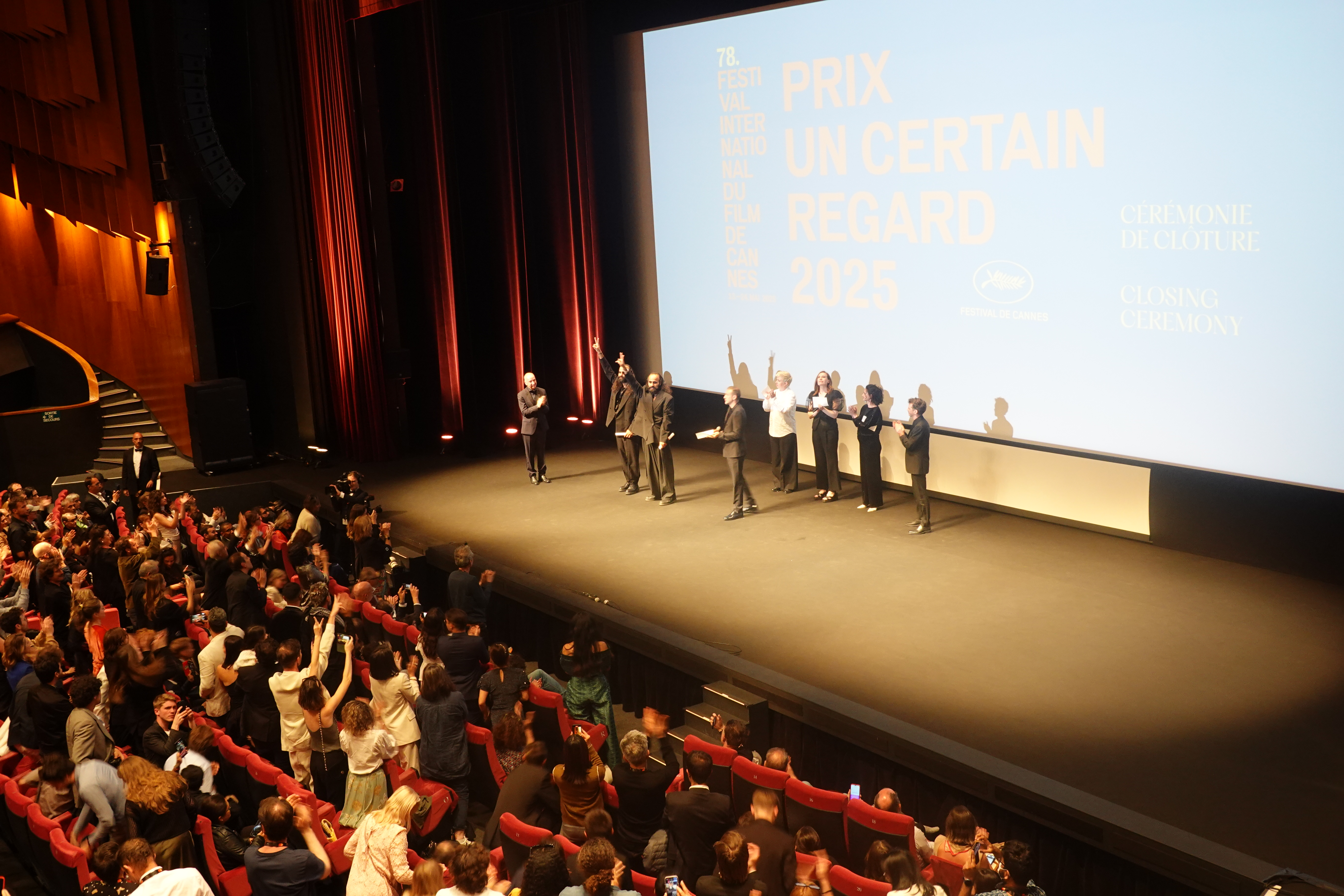
Tarzan Nasser and Arab Nasser, Palestinian film directors, accepting the Un Certain Regard directing award for Once Upon a Time in Gaza at the 2025 Cannes Film Festival.

The Hollywood Reporter called the film "A small-scale deadpan epic with broader implications" and commended the Nasser Brothers for making films about the complexities of life amid geopolitical conflict.

RogerEbert.com stated that the film's two halves structurally disjointed but commended "the lurching, unpredictable nature of the narrative."

Variety found the film, while successfully comedic at times, "more facsimile than homage or self-reflection" due to its inconsistent focus and its reliance on coincidence as conclusion, as well as its lack of depth on some of its characters' motivations.

Screen Daily said that "much of the film works in a muted, realist, atmospherically dense thriller mode" and lauded the film's focus on its main characters, as well as its self-awareness with regard to "the difference between filmed and real imagery."

Next Best Picture gave the film a score of seven out of ten, appreciating its successful realization of a "crime thriller" movie with relevant political commentary but finding it somewhat derivative of the Nasser Brothers' genre influences such as Nicolas Winding Refn, Quentin Tarantino, and the Safdie brothers.

Little White Lies appreciated that the Nasser Brothers conveyed the "decades of suffering which Palestinians have been subjected to" through "webs of subtext" rather than spectacular, fetishized displays of violence.

Loud and Clear gave the film four stars out five, calling it "Necessary and remarkable... a beautifully shot and politically significant film, especially relevant today." It lamented that the film's second half was weaker and "sometimes too on the nose."

Cairo Scene called the film funny, unpredictable, and charming, while also lauding its "film-within-a film element" in regards to its plot around The Rebel, an action movie shot in Gaza. Of the Nasser Brothers, Cairo Scene concluded that "They created a film that is both unflinching and unexpectedly uplifting. It demands to be seen."

Rotten Tomatoes gives the film a score of 92% based on 13 reviews as of December 2025.
