= When Morning Comes =

- Directed by: Kelly Fyffe-Marshall
- Written by: Kelly Fyffe-Marshall
- Produced by: Tamar Bird; Iva Golubovic; Sasha Leigh Henry; Donisha Prendergast
- Starring: Djamari Roberts; Shaquana Wilson; Jarden Crooks
- Cinematography: Jordan Oram
- Edited by: Nicole Sison
- Production company: Sunflower Studios
- Release date: September 12, 2022 (TIFF)
- Running time: 87 minutes
- Countries: Canada; Jamaica
- Language: English

When Morning Comes is a 2022 Canadian-Jamaican drama film, written and directed by Kelly Fyffe-Marshall. The film centres on Jamal (Djamari Roberts), a young boy in Jamaica who is processing his uncertain feelings about his mother Neesha's (Shaquana Wilson) decision to send him to live in Canada with his grandmother following his father's death.

In May 2022, following his win of the Toronto Film Critics Association's Clyde Gilmour Award, filmmaker David Cronenberg announced that he had selected Fyffe-Marshall as the recipient of the "pay it forward" grant, awarding Fyffe-Marshall $50,000 in post-production services toward the film.

The film premiered in the Discovery program at the 2022 Toronto International Film Festival on September 12, 2022.

== Critical response ==
Courtney Small of That Shelf praised the film, writing that "anchored by strong performances by Roberts and Wilson, stunning cinematography from long time collaborator Jordan Oram, and an amazing soundtrack, there is much to engulf oneself here. Fyffe-Marshall’s constructs a poetically beautiful and heartfelt love letter to Jamaica and sense of community it fosters. When Morning Comes is a mesmerizing work that both delivers on the promise Fyffe-Marshall displayed in her short films and solidifies her as one of the most exciting voices in cinema."

== Awards ==
When Morning Comes was shortlisted for the Directors Guild of Canada's 2022 Jean-Marc Vallée DGC Discovery Award.
