= Shōko Kanazawa =

Japanese calligrapher

Shōko Kanazawa (金澤翔子 Kanazawa Shōko, born 1985) is a Japanese calligrapher.

== Early life and career ==
Kanazawa was born in Tokyo in 1985 and diagnosed with Down syndrome. Her mother, Yasuko Kanazawa, had studied calligraphy under Taiun Yanagida, another notable calligraphist. When Shōko was five years old, Yasuko opened a calligraphy school at her home in Ōta, Tokyo where she began teaching her daughter calligraphy as well. The school, opened for children in their neighborhood, was to help Shōko make friends.

At the age of ten, Shōko Kanazawa had, according to her mother, learned the basics of calligraphy, and was able to write a sutra consisting of 276 characters. In 2001, she won her first award at a calligraphy student exhibition.

Despite these successes, Kanazawa and her mother faced tragedy when she was 14 years old, her father died of a heart attack, adding to the family's hardship. Her mother became determined to exhibit Kanazawa's work when she turned 20, as this was her father's dream.

Her first solo exhibition, The World of Calligraphy, was held in December 2005 in Ginza, Tokyo. People were moved to tears, and the gallery attracted recognition in newspapers and online. This opened the door to her later accomplishments, as she eventually gained international regard. When creating her calligraphy, she wishes to make people happy. These feelings are shown through her works.

== Career and accomplishments ==
Her calligraphy is characterized by its large scale, her largest work to date being 15 meters long. She frequently performs her calligraphy in public, including at temples and shrines such as Kenchō-ji in Kamakura, Tōdai-ji in Nara, Kennin-ji in Kyoto, Chūson-ji in Iwate Prefecture, and Itsukushima Shrine in Hiroshima Prefecture.

Several exhibition spaces are dedicated specifically to her calligraphy works: the Shōko Kanazawa Art Museum in Iwaki, Fukushima Prefecture, opened in 2012, the Sinary Shōko Kanazawa Museum in Kyoto, opened in 2015, and the Shoko Kanazawa Museums in Ginza, Tokyo and Izu, Shizuoka Prefecture.

She has also staged some solo exhibitions. One of them begin the Mori Art Center Gallery in Roppongi Hills. Her solo exhibition in Mori Art Center Gallery is called "Tsuki no Hikari" . The gallery is divided into three parts, showing traces of around fifty of her works.

In 2012, Kanazawa designed the titles of the NHK television drama series Taira no Kiyomori.

For the opening ceremony of the 2013 National Sports Festival of Japan in Tokyo, she created a large work of the Japanese character for dream.

Outside of Japan, Kanazawa has had exhibitions in New York, Plzeň and Prague, all in 2015, and in Singapore in 2016.

On May 20, 2015, she gave a speech at the United Nations Headquarters in New York on the occasion of World Down Syndrome Day. For the Tokyo 2020 Olympics, Kanazawa designed one of the official art posters; she and Kōji Kakinuma were the only calligraphers among the participating poster artists.

On October 18, 2022, Kanazawa was appointed as the Tokyo Tower's first Cultural Ambassador to promote diversity and Japanese culture.

Kanazawa became the subject of a documentary film titled Tomo ni ikiru: Shoka Kanazawa Shōko (Living Together: Calligrapher Shōko Kanazawa), which was directed by Masaaki Miyazawa and released in Japan on June 2, 2023.

Aside from her artwork, she co-authored with her mother several books about calligraphy, from Tamashii no sho (Calligraphy of the Soul) to Umi no uta, yama no koe (Songs of the Sea, Voices of the Mountain).

At the age of 30, she took the step of living independently from her mother, making and eating her own meals. Japan Forward called her the most famous living calligrapher in Japan, and perhaps the most famous calligrapher in the world. The newspaper also said she may be the world's most famous person with Down syndrome.
