= Doubletime =

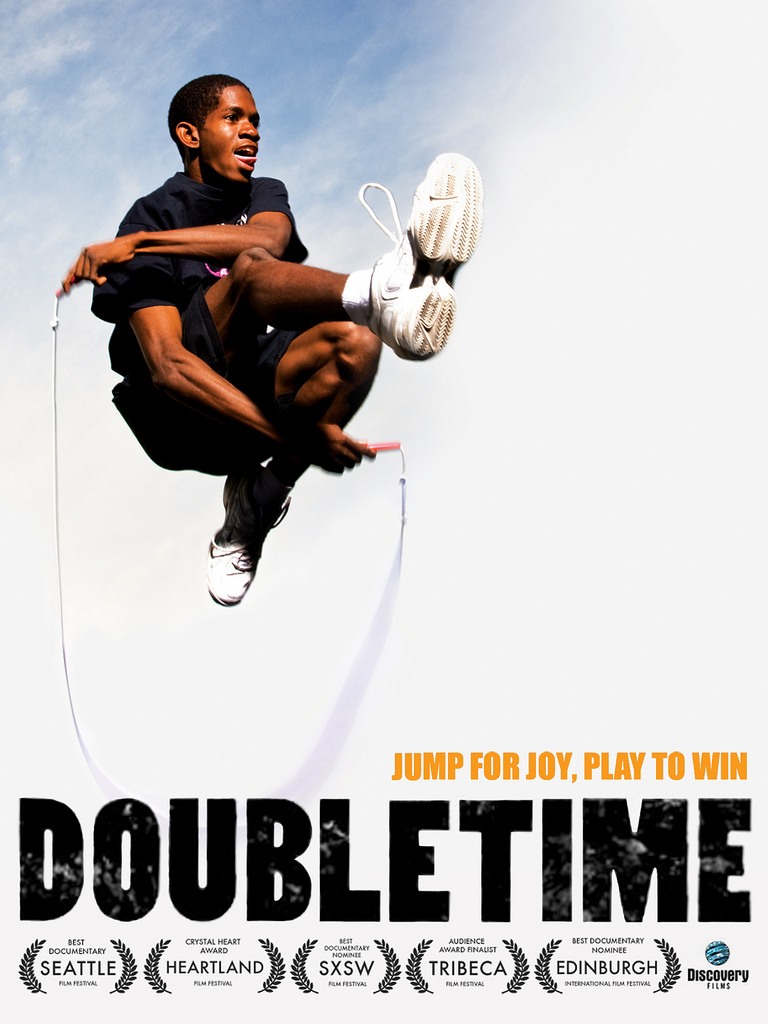
- Festival poster
- Directed by: Stephanie Johnes
- Produced by: Alexandra Johnes; Stephanie Johnes; Andrea Meditch
- Cinematography: Stephanie Johnes
- Edited by: Miki Milmore
- Music by: Pete Miser; Jonathan Zalben; Joel Goodman
- Distributed by: Discovery Films
- Release date: March 10, 2007 (South by Southwest)
- Running time: 82 minutes
- Country: United States
- Language: English

Doubletime is a documentary film about the sport of modern-day jump roping and Double Dutch. The film follows two disparate teams—one suburban white and one inner-city black—as they train to compete against each other for the very first time.

== Cast ==
- Ray Fredrick, coach of the Bouncing Bulldogs
- Joseph Edney, a member of the Bouncing Bulldogs
- Timothy Martin, a member of the Bouncing Bulldogs
- Erica Zenn, a member of the Bouncing Bulldogs
- Joy Holman, coach of the Double Dutch Forces
- Lacie Doolittle, a member of the Double Dutch Forces
- Antoine Cutner, a member of the Double Dutch Forces
- Tia Rankin, a member of the Double Dutch Forces
- Mike Peterson, an assistant coach of the Double Dutch Forces
- David Walker, the founder of the American Double Dutch League
- Richard Cendali, the founder of U.S.A. Jump Rope League

== Awards and festivals ==
- Seattle Film Festival, Best Documentary
- “Best Sports Documentary” Newsday, 2007
- Heartland Film Festival, Crystal Heart Award
- South by Southwest Film Festival, Audience Award Finalist
- Tribeca Film Festival, Audience Award Nominee
- AFI/ Silverdocs
- Mill Valley Film Festival
- Edinburgh International Film Festival

== See also ==
- Spellbound (2002 film)
- Mad Hot Ballroom
