= City of Wind =

2023 Mongolian drama film

- Mongolian: Сэр сэр салхи
- Directed by: Lkhagvadulam Purev-Ochir
- Written by: Lkhagvadulam Purev-Ochir
- Produced by: Katia Khazak; Charlotte Vincent
- Starring: Tergel Bold-Erdene; Nomin-Erdene Ariunbyamba; Bulgan Chuluunbat; Ganzorig Tsetsgee; Tsend-Ayush Nyamsuren
- Cinematography: Vasco Carvalho Viana
- Edited by: Matthieu Taponier
- Music by: Vasco Mendonça
- Production companies: Aurora Films; Guru Media; Uma Pedro No Sapato; Volya Films; 27 Films Production; VOO
- Release date: August 31, 2023 (Venice)
- Running time: 103 minutes
- Countries: France; Mongolia; Portugal; Netherlands; Germany; Qatar
- Language: Mongolian

City of Wind (Mongolian: Сэр сэр салхи, romanized: Ser ser salkhi, lit. 'A soft cool breeze') is a 2023 drama film written and directed by Lkhagvadulam Purev-Ochir in her feature directorial debut.

The film had its world premiere at the Orizzonti section of the 80th Venice International Film Festival. It was selected as the Mongolian entry for the Best International Feature Film at the 96th Academy Awards.

== Plot ==
Ze is a shaman. He studies hard to succeed in life, while communing with the spirits of his ancestors to help the members of his community. When Ze meets Maralaa, his power wavers for the first time and another reality appears.

== Cast ==
- Tergel Bold-Erdene
- Nomin-Erdene Ariunbyamba
- Bulgan Chuluunbat
- Ganzorig Tsetsgee
- Tsend-Ayush Nyamsuren

== Release ==
The film had its world premiere in the Orizzonti section at the 80th edition of the Venice Film Festival. It was also invited at the 28th Busan International Film Festival in 'A Window on Asian Cinema' section and it was screened on 7 October 2023.

It was again invited at the 29th Busan International Film Festival in 'Special program in focus' Teenage Minds, Teenage Movies section and it will be screened in October 2024.

== Reception ==
=== Critical response ===
On Rotten Tomatoes, the film has a 100% approval rating based on 8 reviews with an average rating of 7/10.

=== Awards and nominations ===
Awards and nominations for City of Wind
Award	Date of ceremony	Category	Recipient(s)	Result	Ref.
Venice Film Festival	9 September 2023	Orizzonti Award for Best Actor	Tergel Bold-Erdene	Won	
Venice Film Festival	9 September 2023	Orizzonti Award for Best Film	Lkhagvadulam Purev-Ochir	Nominated	

== See also ==
- List of submissions to the 96th Academy Awards for Best International Feature Film
- List of Mongolian submissions for the Academy Award for Best International Feature Film
