= Toronto International Film Festival NETPAC Prize =

Annual Canadian film award

The Toronto International Film Festival NETPAC Prize is an annual film award, presented by the Network for the Promotion of Asian Cinema to honour the best film from the Asia-Pacific region screened at the Toronto International Film Festival. The award was presented for the first time in 2012.

== Winners ==
Year	Film	Director(s)	Ref
2012	The Land of Hope	Sion Sono	
2013	Qissa	Anup Singh	
2014	Margarita, with a Straw	Shonali Bose	
2015	The Whispering Star	Sion Sono	
2016	In Between	Maysaloun Hamoud	
2017	The Great Buddha+	Huang Hsin-Yao	
2018	The Third Wife	Ash Mayfair	
2018	The Crossing	Bai Xue	
2019	1982	Oualid Mouaness	
2020	Gaza mon amour	Tarzan Nasser, Arab Nasser	
2021	Costa Brava, Lebanon	Mounia Akl	
2022	Sweet As	Jub Clerc	
2023	A Match (Sthal)	Jayant Digambar Somalkar	
2023	Mimang	Kim Taeyang	
2024	The Last of the Sea Women	Sue Kim	
2025	In Search of the Sky (Vimukt)	Jitank Singh Gurjar	
2026	Thirteen in Gaza (غزة 13)	Hosam Abu Dan	
