= Tiffany Hsiung =

Canadian documentary filmmaker

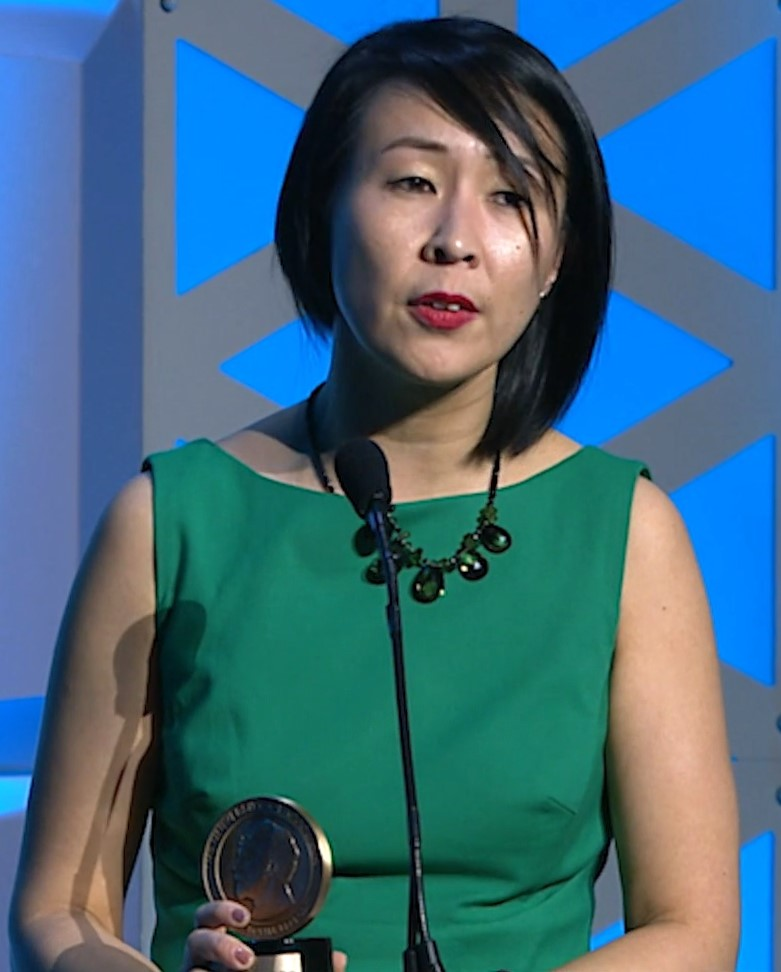
Hsiung receiving her Peabody Award in 2019

Tiffany Hsiung is a Canadian documentary filmmaker. She is most noted for her 2016 documentary film The Apology, which won a Peabody Award in 2019, and her 2020 short documentary film Sing Me a Lullaby, which won the Share Her Journey award at the 2020 Toronto International Film Festival, and the Canadian Screen Award for Best Short Documentary at the 9th Canadian Screen Awards in 2021.

In 2018, she was one of eight women filmmakers selected for the Academy of Canadian Cinema and Television's Apprenticeship for Women Directors program, alongside Kathleen Hepburn, Kirsten Carthew, Alicia K. Harris, Allison White, Asia Youngman, Halima Ouardiri, and Kristina Wagenbauer. In 2020, Hsiung was named DOC NYC's top 40 under 40.

In 2019, her documentary short "The Bassinet" was part of NBF's Five@50, marking the 50 year anniversary of the decriminalization of homosexuality in Canada. In 2021, Hsiung's CBC released her documentary short "Until Further Notice."

She received four Emmy Awards nominations for Jane (American TV series)

== See also ==
- List of female film and television directors
