= Toronto International Film Festival People's Choice Award: Documentaries =

Canadian film award

The Toronto International Film Festival People's Choice Award for Documentaries is an annual film award, presented by the Toronto International Film Festival to the film rated as the year's most popular documentary film with festival audiences. The award was first introduced in 2009; prior to its introduction, documentary films were eligible for the Toronto International Film Festival People's Choice Award, with two documentaries having won that award and six having been named as runners-up.

Although most documentaries at the festival screen in a dedicated TIFF Docs program, documentaries can also be screened in other programs. However, all documentaries are eligible for the award regardless of which program they screened in, rather than being limited exclusively to TIFF Docs titles.

After the award is announced, the festival offers a repeat screening of the winner at the TIFF Lightbox on the final day of the festival.

Unlike the main People's Choice Award for feature films, however, the documentary award does not have a similar record of being a reliable predictor of Academy Award nominations.

== Process ==
The voting process is the same as for the feature film People's Choice: at each documentary film screening, attendees are invited to vote for the film online, with voters' e-mail addresses cross-referenced against the ticket registrations to ensure that the vote cannot be manipulated by people who have not seen the film.

== Winners and runners-up ==
Year	Film	Director(s)	Ref
2009	The Topp Twins: Untouchable Girls	Leanne Pooley	
2009	Capitalism: A Love Story	Michael Moore	
2010	Force of Nature: The David Suzuki Movie	Sturla Gunnarsson	
2010	Nostalgia for the Light	Patricio Guzman	
2011	The Island President	Jon Shenk	
2011	First Position	Bess Kargman	
2011	Pearl Jam 20	Cameron Crowe	
2012	Artifact	Jared Leto	
2012	Storm Surfers 3D	Christopher Nelius, Justin McMillan	
2012	Revolution	Rob Stewart	
2013	The Square (Al-Midan)	Jehane Noujaim	
2013	Hi-Ho Mistahey!	Alanis Obomsawin	
2013	Beyond the Edge	Leanne Pooley	
2014	Beats of the Antonov	Hajooj Kuka	
2014	Do I Sound Gay?	David Thorpe	
2014	Seymour: An Introduction	Ethan Hawke	
2015	Winter on Fire: Ukraine's Fight for Freedom	Evgeny Afineevsky	
2015	This Changes Everything	Avi Lewis	
2015	Al Purdy Was Here	Brian D. Johnson	
2016	I Am Not Your Negro	Raoul Peck	
2016	Abacus: Small Enough to Jail	Steve James	
2016	Before the Flood	Fisher Stevens	
2017	Faces Places	Agnès Varda, JR	
2017	Long Time Running	Jennifer Baichwal, Nicholas de Pencier	
2017	Super Size Me 2: Holy Chicken!	Morgan Spurlock	
2018	Free Solo	E. Chai Vasarhelyi, Jimmy Chin	
2018	This Changes Everything	Tom Donahue	
2018	The Biggest Little Farm	John Chester	
2019	The Cave	Feras Fayyad	
2019	I Am Not Alone	Garin Hovannisian	
2019	Dads	Bryce Dallas Howard	
2020	Inconvenient Indian	Michelle Latimer	
2020	No runners-up named due to the reduced lineup in light of the COVID-19 pandemic in Toronto.		
2021	The Rescue	Elizabeth Chai Vasarhelyi, Jimmy Chin	
2021	Dionne Warwick: Don't Make Me Over	Dave Wooley, David Heilbroner	
2021	Flee	Jonas Poher Rasmussen	
2022	Black Ice	Hubert Davis	
2022	Maya and the Wave	Stephanie Johnes	
2022	752 Is Not a Number	Babak Payami	
2023	Mr. Dressup: The Magic of Make-Believe	Robert McCallum	
2023	Summer Qamp	Jen Markowitz	
2023	Mountain Queen: The Summits of Lhakpa Sherpa	Lucy Walker	
2024	The Tragically Hip: No Dress Rehearsal	Mike Downie	
2024	Will & Harper	Josh Greenbaum	
2024	Your Tomorrow	Ali Weinstein	
2025	The Road Between Us: The Ultimate Rescue	Barry Avrich	
2025	EPiC: Elvis Presley in Concert	Baz Luhrmann	
2025	You Had To Be There: How the Toronto Godspell Ignited the Comedy Revolution, Spread Love & Overalls, and Created a Community That Changed the World (In a Canadian Kind of Way)	Nick Davis	
2026	Darlene Love: I Know Where I've Been	Barry Avrich	
2026	Black Sunflowers	James Marcus Haney	
2026	The Ultra Runner	Mila Aung-Thwin	

== See also ==
- Hot Docs Audience Awards
- Academy Award for Best Documentary Feature
