= Joseph Amenta =

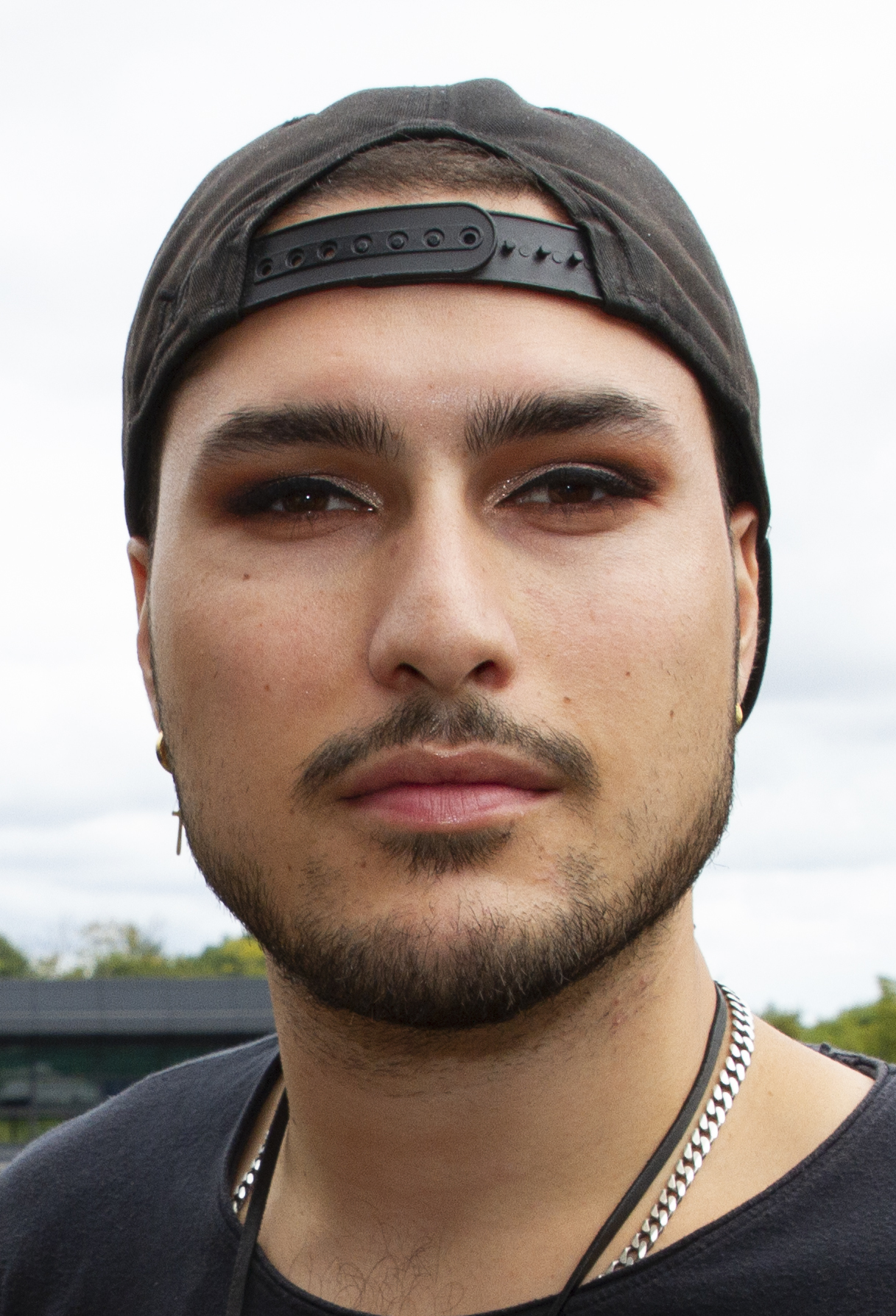
- Occupation(s): film director, screenwriter
- Years active: 2000s-present
- Notable work: Flood, Soft

Joseph Amenta is a Canadian film director and screenwriter, whose debut feature film Soft premiered at the 2022 Toronto International Film Festival.

Prior to Soft, Amenta directed a number of short films, the most noted of which, Flood, premiered at the 2019 Toronto International Film Festival and included Tynomi Banks in its cast.

Amenta is non-binary and uses gender-neutral pronouns.

== Filmography ==
- Growing Up Cooter - 2013
- Wild Youth - 2015
- Cherry Cola - 2018
- Haus - 2018
- Flood - 2019
- Soft - 2022
