= Snow in September =

2022 short film

- Film poster
- Mongolian: 9-р Сарын Цас
- Directed by: Lkhagvadulam Purev-Ochir
- Written by: Lkhagvadulam Purev-Ochir
- Produced by: Katia Khazak; Ariunaa Tserenpil; Charlotte Vincent
- Starring: Sukhbat Munkhbaatar; Enkhgerel Baasanjav; Nomin-Erdene Ariunbyamba
- Cinematography: Amine Berrada
- Edited by: Marylou Vergez
- Music by: Maxence Dussère
- Production company: Aurora Films
- Release date: September 8, 2022 (Venice)
- Running time: 20 minutes
- Countries: Mongolia; France
- Language: Mongolian

Snow in September (Mongolian: 9-р Сарын Цас) is a Mongolian/French short drama film, directed by Lkhagvadulam Purev-Ochir and released in 2022. The film stars Sukhbat Munkhbaatar as Davka, a teenager in Ulaanbaatar who must change his views of intimacy and relationships when he meets a woman (Enkhgerel Baasanjav) who claims to be a friend of his mother's.

The film premiered at the 79th Venice International Film Festival, where it was the winner of the Orizzonti award for Best Short Film. It was subsequently screened at the 2022 Toronto International Film Festival, where it won the award for Best International Short Film.
