= Zelly and Me =

- Film poster
- Directed by: Tina Rathborne
- Written by: Tina Rathborne
- Produced by: Tina Rathborne
- Starring: Isabella Rossellini; Glynis Johns; Alexandra Johnes; David Lynch; Joe Morton
- Cinematography: Mikael Salomon
- Edited by: Cindy Kaplan Rooney
- Music by: Pino Donaggio
- Distributed by: Columbia Pictures
- Release date: April 15, 1988 (United States)
- Running time: 87 minutes
- Budget: $1.5 million

Zelly and Me is a 1988 American drama film written, directed and produced by Tina Rathborne and starring Isabella Rossellini, Glynis Johns and Alexandra Johnes. Filmmaker David Lynch features in a minor role.

Released on April 15, 1988, Zelly and Me has received mixed reviews, citing its unsteady tone and a narrative which one reviewer felt would be more suited to a novel than a film.

== Plot ==
After her parents' death in an airplane crash, Phoebe is raised by her wealthy but narcissist grandmother Co-Co and a nanny, Zelly. Co-Co and Zelly find themselves competing for the child's affections, leading to Phoebe growing isolated when Co-Co jealously fires all of her staff and even emotionally abuses Phoebe. In the end after Co-Co fires Zelly, Phoebe finally puts her foot down and stands up for herself and calls her out on her abusive behavior. The film ends with Phoebe heading back to school after the summer ends while Co-Co looks on in melancholy realizing she no longer has any mental control over her granddaughter.

== Cast ==
- Alexandra Johnes as Phoebe
- Glynis Johns as Co-Co
- Isabella Rossellini as Zelly
- Kaiulani Lee as Nora
- David Lynch as Willie
- Joe Morton as Earl

== Production ==
Zelly and Me was the first film by writer and director Tina Rathborne. The film was greenlit by David Puttnam during his tenure as head of Columbia Pictures, and was based on Rathborne's own childhood. Rathborne cast Rossellini's real-life partner David Lynch in a small role in the film, as Rossellini's character's lover. As a result, Lynch would later offer Rathborne the opportunity to direct for his 1990 television series Twin Peaks. Lynch agreed to take part in the film at Rossellini's behest, in order to overcome his fear of acting.

== Release and reception ==
It's heartfelt, and marked by some devoted work, but ... Rathborne hasn't yet learned how to let the really powerful stuff boil up implicitly from beneath the surface. Here, everything is on the surface, rather flatfootedly and awkwardly laid out, with clunky establishing speeches and pointers that deflate whatever mystery and tension lies in the material.

— The Boston Globe's Jay Carr

Zelly and Me was released on April 15, 1988. The film had previously been screened as part of the 1988 Sundance Film Festival, on January 23.

A review for Film4 has described Zelly and Me as unsure of its own narrative and tone, describing it as "a little uneven, [but] nevertheless well worth a look". Writing for AllMovie, Iotis Erlewine rated the film two-and-a-half stars out of five. Vincent Canby, writing for The New York Times, felt that the film did not work in cinematic terms, and that the story would have been better served as a novel. Canby also found himself unsure of how eccentric the film was intended to be, particularly finding that Lynch and Rossellini seemed "creepy", whether they "intended to be or not".

The film's review at the 1988 Sundance Film Festival described it as a "deeply moving and beautifully acted portrait of childhood pain", adding that Lynch's role was played "with a wholesomeness that belies expectations". Writing for The Boston Globe, Jay Carr felt that the film was clumsily written and lacking in subtlety. However, he felt that the acting throughout the cast was good, citing the performances of Rossellini, Johnes and Joe Morton. Carr felt that the standout performance was by Lynch, describing him as "never anything but soft and gentlemanly on the surface, but there's always something scary about him".

== Footnotes ==
=== References ===
- Rathborne, Tina (2001), Episode 3: Commentary (DVD), Twin Peaks: The Complete First Season: Artisan Entertainment
- Barney, Richard A. (2009). David Lynch: Interviews. University Press of Mississippi. ISBN 978-1604732368.
