= Dégradé =

- Directed by: Tarzan and Arab Nasser
- Written by: Arab and Tarzan Nasser
- Produced by: Rashid Abdelhamid; Marie Legrand; Rani Massalha
- Starring: Hiam Abbas
- Cinematography: Eric Devin
- Edited by: Sophie Reine; Eyas Salman
- Distributed by: Le Pacte, Elle Driver
- Release date: 17 May 2015 (Cannes)
- Running time: 85 minutes
- Countries: France; Qatar; Palestine
- Languages: French; Arabic

Dégradé (Arabic: ديچراديه) is a 2015 Palestinian drama film directed by Tarzan and Arab Nasser (also known as Mohammed Abunasser and Ahmed Abunasser). It was selected to compete in the Critics' Week section at the 2015 Cannes Film Festival.

== Cast ==
- Hiam Abbas
- Sameera Asir as Fatima
- Victoria Balitska as Christeen
- Raya Khatib as Ruba
- Raneem Daoud as Mariam
- Manal Awad
- Dina Shuhaiber
- Maisa Abdelhadi
- Huda Al Imam
- Widad Al Nasser baa
- Mirna Sakhleh

== See also ==
- List of Palestinian films
