= Bria Mack Gets a Life =

Canadian television sitcom

- Genre: Sitcom
- Created by: Sasha Leigh Henry
- Written by: Sasha Leigh Henry; Kelly Fyffe-Marshall; Keavy Lynch; Jessica Meya
- Directed by: Sasha Leigh Henry; Kelly Fyffe-Marshall
- Starring: Malaika Hennie-Hamadi; Hannan Younis; Leslie Adlam
- Country of origin: Canada
- No. of seasons: 1
- No. of episodes: 6

Production
- Production locations: Toronto, Ontario
- Running time: 21–22 minutes
- Production company: New Metric Media

Original release
- Network: Crave
- Release: October 13, 2023

Bria Mack Gets a Life is a Canadian television comedy series that premiered on Crave on October 13, 2023. The series stars Malaika Hennie-Hamadi as Bria "Mack" McFarlane, a young Black Canadian woman who has recently graduated from university, and is navigating the challenges of establishing her adult life with the help of Black Attack (Hannan Younis), her invisible hype girl.

== Premise ==
After completing university, Bria Mack plans to move back into her mother Marie's home in Brampton while she figures out her next steps in life, but must quickly adjust when Marie (Leslie Adlam) announces plans to sell the home and move to Florida with her partner Rodrigo (Manuel Rodriguez-Saenz). Forced into an entry-level job with a company that is trying to present a new image of diversity by hiring people of colour after coming under fire for racially-insensitive advertising campaigns, she must navigate the challenges of her new reality.

== Production ==
The cast also includes Amalia Williamson, Marlee Sansom, Preeti Torul, Robert Bazzocchi, Femi Lawson, Nia Cummins, Robert Clarke, Shannon Jardine, Dave Merheje, Jamaal Ellis, Ivan Lopez, James Hartnett, Juan Carlos Velis and Catherine De Seve.

The series was created by Sasha Leigh Henry, and directed by Henry and Kelly Fyffe-Marshall. It entered production in Toronto in fall 2022. Henry has described the inspiration behind the series as a sort of cross between Luther, Obama's Anger Translator from Key & Peele and Connie the Hormone Monstress from Big Mouth, with Black Attack representing Bria's inner voice expressing all the things she wishes she were confident enough to say out loud.

== Distribution ==
In advance of its television premiere, it received a preview screening in the Primetime program at the 2023 Toronto International Film Festival.

Crave did not renew the series for a second season, although it did order up another series, the crime drama Bad Trips, from Leigh-Henry.

== Critical response ==
Courtney Small of That Shelf praised the series, writing that "While the endless social media references will delight the millennial audiences, Bria Mack Gets A Life will also speak to all those who have been at a crossroads at some point in their life. People of colour, especially Black women, will nod knowingly observing the numerous micro-aggressions Bria experiences working in a predominantly white office space. Using the office environment as an example of the harm that often lurks underneath Canadian politeness, Henry manages to weave plenty of social commentary into each of the shows many laughs." He concluded that "though there will no doubt be comparisons to the works of Issa Rae, make no mistake that Henry’s distinct voice in undeniably heard in every facet of this show. A sharp and bold comedy for the ages, Bria Mack Gets A Life firmly asserts itself as Canada’s next great series that should not be missed."

Exclaim! listed Bria Mack Gets a Life at number ten on its list of ten best television shows of 2023.

== Awards ==
The series won the Canadian Screen Award for Best Comedy Series at the 12th Canadian Screen Awards in 2024.
