= Brian D. Johnson =

Canadian journalist and filmmaker

Brian D. Johnson is a Canadian journalist and filmmaker, best known as an entertainment reporter and film critic for Maclean's.

He first joined the magazine in 1985. In early 2014, Johnson announced his retirement as a full-time staff member of the magazine, although he remains an occasional freelance contributor. He has also contributed to Rolling Stone and The Globe and Mail, and has won three National Magazine Awards for his writing.

He was a founding member of the Toronto Film Critics Association, and served as the organization's president from 2009 to 2017.

Johnson has also published the poetry book Marzipan Lies (1974), the novel Volcano Days (1994) and the non-fiction book Brave Films, Wild Nights: 25 Years of Festival Fever (2000), a history of the Toronto International Film Festival.

As a filmmaker, he directed the short films Tell Me Everything (2006) and Yesno (2010). His first feature film as a documentarian, Al Purdy Was Here, debuted at the 2015 Toronto International Film Festival, where it finished third in the voting for the Grolsch People's Choice Documentary Award.

His documentary film The Colour of Ink premiered at the 2022 Toronto International Film Festival.

He is married to writer and broadcaster Marni Jackson.
