= Venus and Serena (film) =

- Directed by: Maiken Baird; Michelle Major
- Produced by: Maiken Baird; Michelle Major
- Starring: Venus Williams; Serena Williams
- Cinematography: Cliff Charles; Rashidi Harper; Stephanie Johnes
- Edited by: Sam Pollard
- Music by: Wyclef Jean
- Distributed by: Magnolia Pictures
- Release dates: 6 October 2012 (Hamptons International Film Festival); 10 May 2013 (United States)
- Country: United States
- Language: English
- Box office: $10,981

Venus and Serena is a 2012 American documentary film that takes an inside look at lives and careers of professional tennis players, Venus and Serena Williams. The film was directed by Maiken Baird and Michelle Major. It was the official selection at the 2013 Miami International Film Festival, 2012 Toronto Film Festival, 2012 Tribeca Film Festival and 2012 Bermuda Docs Film Festival. Venus and Serena was released by Magnolia Pictures on May 10, 2013.

== Cast ==
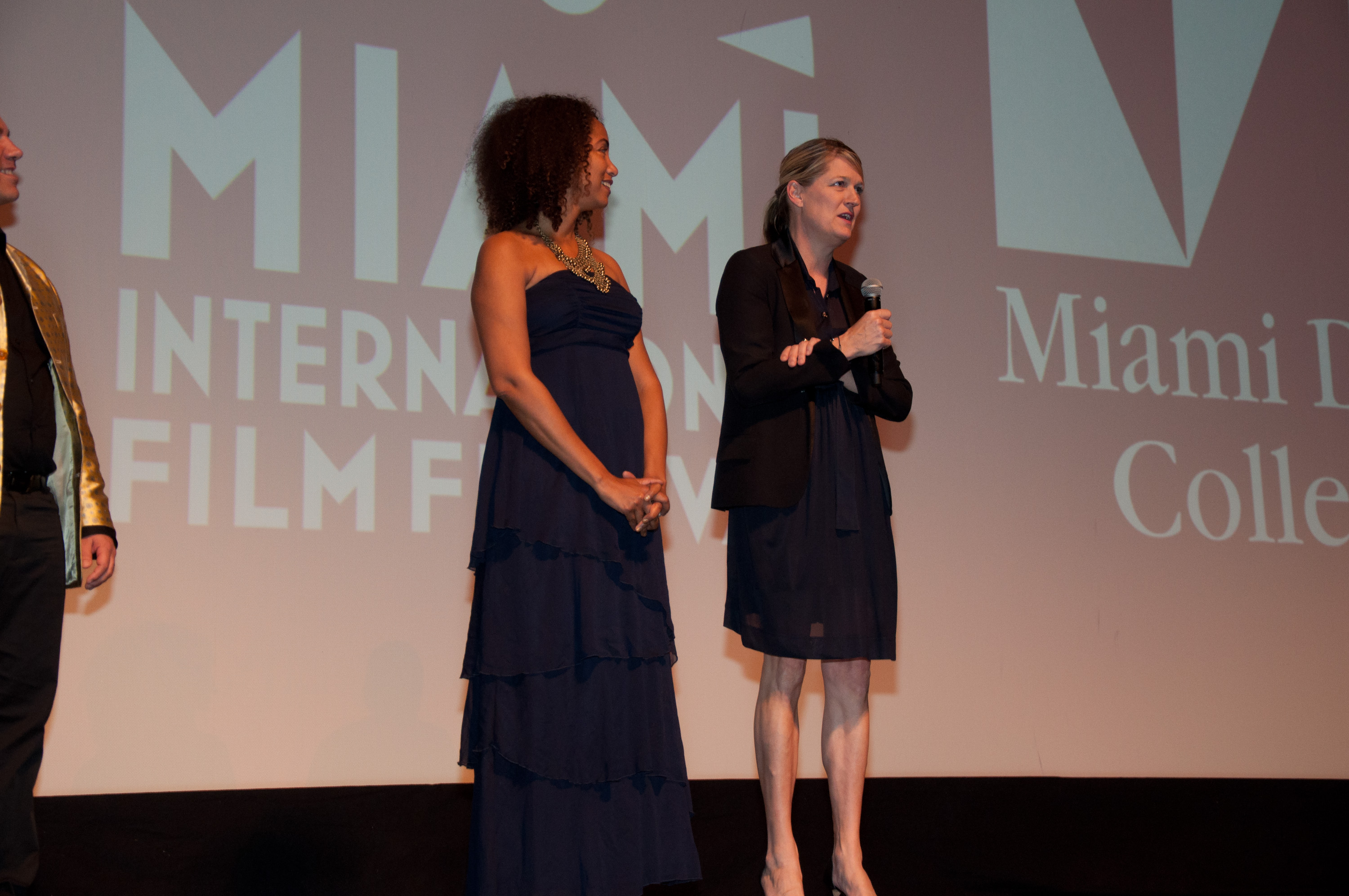
Directors Michelle Major and Maiken Baird at the 2013 Miami International Film Festival premiere

- Venus Williams as herself
- Serena Williams as herself
- Richard Williams as himself
- Oracene Price as herself
- Billie Jean King as herself
