= Stephanie Johnes =

American documentary filmmaker

Stephanie Johnes is an American documentary filmmaker. She is most noted for her 2024 film Maya and the Wave, which was the first runner-up for the People's Choice Award for Documentaries at the 2022 Toronto International Film Festival.

The sister of film producer Alexandra Johnes, she also directed the films Bouncing Bulldogs and Doubletime, and was a cinematographer on the documentary film Venus and Serena.
