= Kōji Kakinuma =

Japanese calligrapher

Kōji Kakinuma (柿沼康二 Kakinuma Kōji, born July 16, 1970) is a Japanese calligrapher.

Kakinuma was born in Yaita, Tochigi Prefecture. He began his calligraphy training at the age of five first under his father, Suiryū Kakinuma, and then under Yūkei Teshima, who is considered one of the Sanpitsu (“Three Brushes”) of the Shōwa Era, and Ichijō Uematsu. In 1993, Kakinuma graduated from the Department of Visual and Performing Arts, Tokyo Gakugei University, with a Bachelor of Fine Arts degree. Before becoming a full-time fine artist, he worked as a high-school teacher. From 2006 to 2007 he held a visiting fellowship at Princeton University.

Two trademarks of his calligraphy work are oversized formats of up to 750 × 1100 cm painted with giant brushes, and the frequent repetition of the same character or phrase, which he calls "trance work".

Kakinuma considers himself not only a calligrapher but also "a contemporary artist, using tools other than my brush or expressing something other than writing, happily working in genres outside calligraphy, such as performing art, installation, etc." For instance, he has used masking tape in the creation of some of his works.

Kakinuma has held solo exhibitions at, among other places, the Tarō Okamoto Memorial Museum (in both 2010 and 2021/2022) and the 21st Century Museum of Contemporary Art, Kanazawa (2013) where he was the first living calligrapher to do so.

He has performed his calligraphy to live audiences around the world, at venues such as the Metropolitan Museum of Art in New York, the John F. Kennedy Center for the Performing Arts in Washington, D.C., and the 2005 Earth Celebration festival at Sado island.

He has won numerous awards including two Mainichi Calligraphy Exhibition awards in 1996 and 1999, the Dokuritsu Shojin-dan award in the "huge work" category in 2002, and the 4th Teshima Yukei Award in 2009.

Kakinuma is one of twelve artists who are the subject of the 2018 documentary film Traces of the Soul about contemporary calligraphy worldwide. He also appears in the 2022 documentary The Colour of Ink, creating work using handmade ink from inkmaker Jason Logan.

He was the only calligrapher besides Shōko Kanazawa to contribute to the Tokyo 2020 Official Art Posters Collection.
