= Dustin (film) =

2020 French short drama film

- Film poster
- Directed by: Naïla Guiguet
- Written by: Naïla Guiguet
- Produced by: Jean-Étienne Brat; Lou Chicoteau
- Starring: Dustin Muchuvitz; Félix Maritaud
- Cinematography: Claire Mathon
- Edited by: Nathan Jacquard; Vincent Tricon
- Production company: Alta Rocca Films
- Release date: September 13, 2020 (TIFF)
- Running time: 20 minutes
- Country: France
- Language: French

Dustin is a French short drama film, directed by Naïla Guiguet and released in 2020. The film stars Dustin Muchuvitz as Dustin, a trans woman attending a rave with her boyfriend Félix (Félix Maritaud).

The film was named as an official selection of the Critics' Week program at the 2020 Cannes Film Festival, but was not able to be screened due to the cancellation of the festival in light of the COVID-19 pandemic in France. It was screened at the 2020 Toronto International Film Festival, where it was named the winner of the IMDbPro Short Cuts Award for Best International Short Film.
