= Paul Shkordoff =

Canadian filmmaker and screenwriter

Paul Shkordoff is a Canadian filmmaker and screenwriter from Toronto, Ontario. He is most noted for his 2020 short film Benjamin, Benny, Ben, which won the award for the award for Best Canadian Short Film at the 2020 Toronto International Film Festival and was a Canadian Screen Award nominee for Best Live Action Short Drama at the 9th Canadian Screen Awards in 2021.

He has also directed the short films Grove (2020) and Twelve Hours (2021), and the music video "Somnambule" for Jean-Michel Blais.
