= Maya and the Wave =

- Directed by: Stephanie Johnes
- Produced by: Stephanie Johnes
- Starring: Maya Gabeira
- Cinematography: Stephanie Johnes; Jorge Leal; João Pedro Plácido; Dudu Miranda
- Edited by: Shannon Kennedy; Jordana Berg
- Music by: Turtle
- Production company: Uncle Booster
- Release dates: September 9, 2022 (TIFF); September 13, 2024 (United States)
- Running time: 95 minutes
- Country: United States
- Languages: English; Portuguese

Maya and the Wave is an American documentary film, directed by Stephanie Johnes and released in 2024. The film is a portrait of surfer Maya Gabeira and her struggles to be taken seriously as a woman in a male-dominated sport, focusing in part on the role that sexism played in the response to her injuries while trying to surf a giant wave at Praia do Norte in 2013.

The film premiered at the 2022 Toronto International Film Festival on September 9, 2022, and was first runner-up for the People's Choice Award for Documentaries.

== Premise ==
Maya Gabeira grows up in Rio de Janeiro, begins competing in surfing at age 15, and turns pro at 17. However, her abilities are doubted by many of her big wave surfing male peers. In 2013, Gabeira suffers a devastating wipeout at Nazaré, Portugal. She nearly drowns and endures a prolonged recovery that requires back surgeries and physical therapy. Gabeira eventually returns to Nazaré and breaks the record for the largest wave ever surfed by a woman.

== Reception ==
Adam Benzine of Deadline highlighted the film as "beautiful and inspiring" as well as "magnificent," noting its in-depth look at Gabeira’s injury, rehabilitation, and eventual comeback. The review compared the documentary to Lucy Walker’s The Crash Reel, emphasizing that while it appears to be a glossy sports documentary, it delves deeper into themes of recovery from traumatic injury.

Nikki Baughan's review in ScreenDaily praised the film for being "as narratively strong as it is visually impressive." Baughan noted, "Johnes captures the sport’s ingrained sexism, even from those who would claim to support Gabeira," and the film draws parallels between Gabeira's rebellious spirit and her activist father, Fernando Gabeira.

Dennis Harvey of Variety wrote a mostly positive review, remarking, "the film more than succeeds in its primary goals of providing an inspirational role model plus lots of stupendous surfing footage, a combination that will enthrall most viewers." However, he felt that the film's narrative was sometimes poorly organized, and it failed to adequately examine the complicated relationship between Gabeira and her "first major mentor and coach," Carlos Burle.

Writing for RogerEbert.com, Marya E. Gates commended the film’s unique approach, noting that “what makes Maya such a compelling subject and Johnes’ portrait of her so different from films about male surf legends, is Gabeira’s willingness to admit her fear,” which sets her apart from the typical adrenaline-driven narrative of big wave surfing.
