= So Much Tenderness =

2022 Canadian film directed by Lina Rodriguez

- Film poster
- Directed by: Lina Rodriguez
- Written by: Lina Rodriguez
- Produced by: Brad Deane; Lina Rodriguez
- Starring: Noëlle Schönwald; Francisco Zaldua; Deragh Campbell
- Cinematography: Nikolay Michaylov
- Edited by: Brad Deane; Lina Rodriguez
- Music by: Chris A. Cummings
- Production companies: Arbitrage Pictures; Rayon Verde; TimeLapse Pictures
- Distributed by: Mongrel Media
- Release date: September 10, 2022 (TIFF)
- Running time: 118 minutes
- Country: Canada
- Languages: English; Spanish

So Much Tenderness is a 2022 Canadian drama film, written, directed, produced, and edited by Lina Rodriguez. The film stars Noëlle Schönwald as Aurora, a lawyer from Colombia who emigrated to Canada as a refugee after her husband was murdered in mysterious circumstances, but whose efforts to comfortably settle into her new life are threatened when her cousin Edgar (Francisco Zaldua), who may have been involved in the murder, resurfaces.

The film's cast also includes Natalia Aranguren, Deragh Campbell, Augusto Bitter, Andreana Callegarini-Gradzik, Charlotte Creaghan, Brad Deane, Sebastian Kowollik, Lee Lawson, Kazik Radwanski, Alejandra Adarve, John Goodwin, Robin Guillen, Lina Gómez, Douglas Hann and Alexander Macdonald.

The film was shot in 2021 in Toronto, Hamilton and Bowmanville, Ontario.

The film premiered in the Contemporary World Cinema program at the 2022 Toronto International Film Festival.

== Reception ==
On the review aggregator website Rotten Tomatoes, 83% of 6 critics' reviews are positive, with an average rating of 6.7/10.
