= Gaza mon amour =

2020 drama film

- Film poster
- Directed by: Tarzan Nasser; Arab Nasser
- Written by: Tarzan Nasser; Arab Nasser
- Produced by: Marie Legrand; Rani Massalha
- Starring: Salim Daw; Hiam Abbass
- Cinematography: Christophe Graillot
- Edited by: Véronique Lange
- Music by: Andre Matthias
- Production companies: Les Films du Tambour; Riva Filmproduktion; Ukbar Filmes
- Release date: September 5, 2020 (Venice)
- Running time: 87 minutes
- Countries: Palestine; France; Germany; Portugal; Qatar
- Language: Arabic

Gaza mon amour (lit. 'Gaza my love') is a romantic dramedy film, directed by Tarzan Nasser and Arab Nasser and released in 2020. It is a coproduction of companies from Palestine, France, Germany, Portugal, California and Qatar.

The film premiered at the 2020 Venice Film Festival. It was subsequently screened at the 2020 Toronto International Film Festival, where it was named the winner of the NETPAC Award for best Asian film at the festival. It was selected as the Palestinian entry for the Best International Feature Film at the 93rd Academy Awards, but it was not nominated.

== Synopsis ==
Issa, a 60-year-old fisherman in Gaza has never had the courage to tell Siham he's in love with her. When he finds a phallic sculpture of the Greek god Apollo in his fishing net, he believes his luck may have turned around.

== Cast ==
- Salim Daw as Issa
- Hiam Abbass as Siham

== See also ==
- List of submissions to the 93rd Academy Awards for Best International Feature Film
- List of Palestinian submissions for the Academy Award for Best International Feature Film
