= Lina Rodriguez =

Colombian-Canadian director and screenwriter

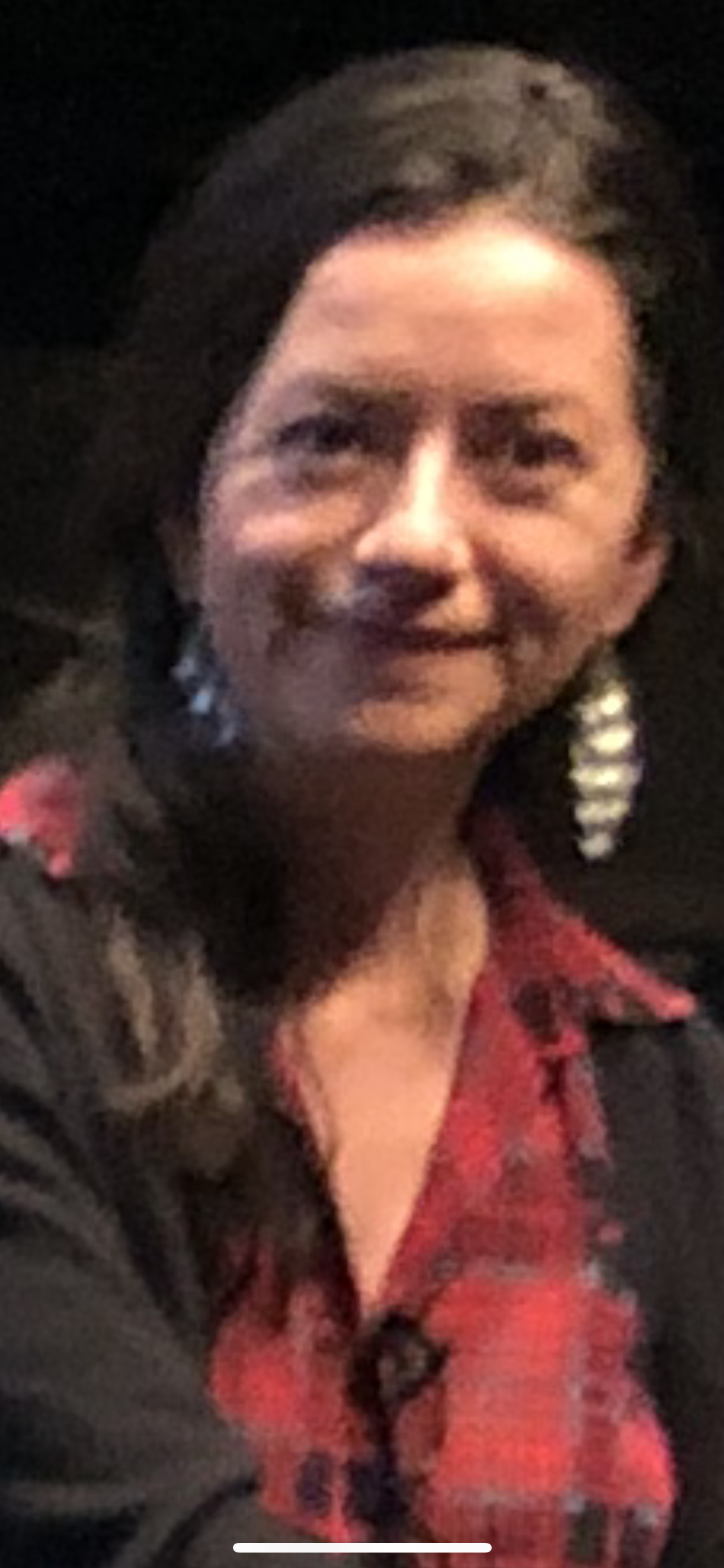
Lina Rodriguez photographed in Montréal, Québec, Canada inside Cinéma Public of Casa D’Italia.

Lina Rodriguez is a Colombian-Canadian filmmaker and screenwriter based in Toronto, Ontario, most noted for her 2022 documentary film My Two Voices (Mis dos voces).

A native of Bogotá, Rodriguez moved to Canada to study film at York University. She wrote and directed a number of short films before releasing her debut feature film Señoritas in 2013, which premiered at the Cartagena Film Festival. She followed up in 2016 with This Time Tomorrow (Mañana a esta hora), which premiered at the Locarno Film Festival.

Her short documentary film ante mis ojos premiered in the Wavelengths program at the 2018 Toronto International Film Festival, and Here and There (Aquí y allá) premiered at the 2019 Vancouver International Film Festival.

In 2020, Rodriguez was selected by former TIFF programmer Michèle Maheux as the recipient of the $50,000 "pay it forward" grant from Maheux's Clyde Gilmour Award package.

My Two Voices premiered at the 72nd Berlin International Film Festival, and had its Canadian premiere at the 2022 Hot Docs Canadian International Documentary Festival. In the same year she released her third narrative fiction film So Much Tenderness, which premiered at the 2022 Toronto International Film Festival.
