= Benjamin, Benny, Ben =

2020 Canadian short drama film

- Film poster
- Directed by: Paul Shkordoff
- Written by: Paul Shkordoff
- Produced by: Jason Aita
- Starring: Anwar Haj; Natalie Gallard
- Cinematography: Peter Hadfield
- Edited by: Brendan Mills
- Music by: Kyle McCrea
- Release date: September 13, 2020 (TIFF)
- Running time: 7 minutes
- Country: Canada
- Language: English

Benjamin, Benny, Ben is a Canadian short drama film, directed by Paul Shkordoff and released in 2020. The film stars Anwar Haj as Benjamin, a Black Canadian man on his way to a job interview, whose preparations are threatened when he trips and falls along the way.

The film premiered at the 2020 Toronto International Film Festival, where it was named the winner of the award for Best Canadian Short Film. It was also named as an official selection of the short films competition at the 2020 Cannes Film Festival, which proceeded in October 2020 despite the cancellation of the overall festival in the spring.

The film was named to TIFF's year-end Canada's Top Ten list for short films.

The film received a Canadian Screen Award nomination for Best Live Action Short Drama at the 9th Canadian Screen Awards.
