= Airhostess-737 =

2022 short film

- Directed by: Thanasis Neofotistos
- Written by: Thanasis Neofotistos; Grigoris Skarakis
- Produced by: Ioanna Bolomyti; Dimitris Tsakaleas
- Starring: Lena Papaligoura
- Cinematography: Yannis Fotou
- Edited by: Panos Angelopoulos
- Music by: Lefteris Samson
- Production company: Argonauts Productions
- Distributed by: Tanweer Alliances; Bekke's Short Films
- Release date: 11 August 2022 (Locarno)
- Running time: 16 minutes
- Country: Greece
- Language: Greek

Airhostess-737 is a Greek short drama film, directed by Thanasis Neofotistos and released in 2022. The film stars Lena Papaligoura as Vanina, a flight attendant who has a personal emotional crisis mid-flight, which she initially attributes to physical discomfort from her new braces but which in fact has a deeper cause.

Along with Neofotistos's earlier short films Patision Avenue and Route-3, the film is the final part of a trilogy about characters "drowned by their own subconscious, or the surrounding space that encloses them" while on a physical journey.

The film premiered at the 75th Locarno Film Festival. It was subsequently screened at Sundance and at the 2022 Toronto International Film Festival, where it received an honorable mention for the Best International Short Film award.

The film won the Hellenic Film Academy Award for Best Short Film from the Hellenic Film Academy in 2023.
