= Tarzan and Arab Nasser =

Palestinian twin directors

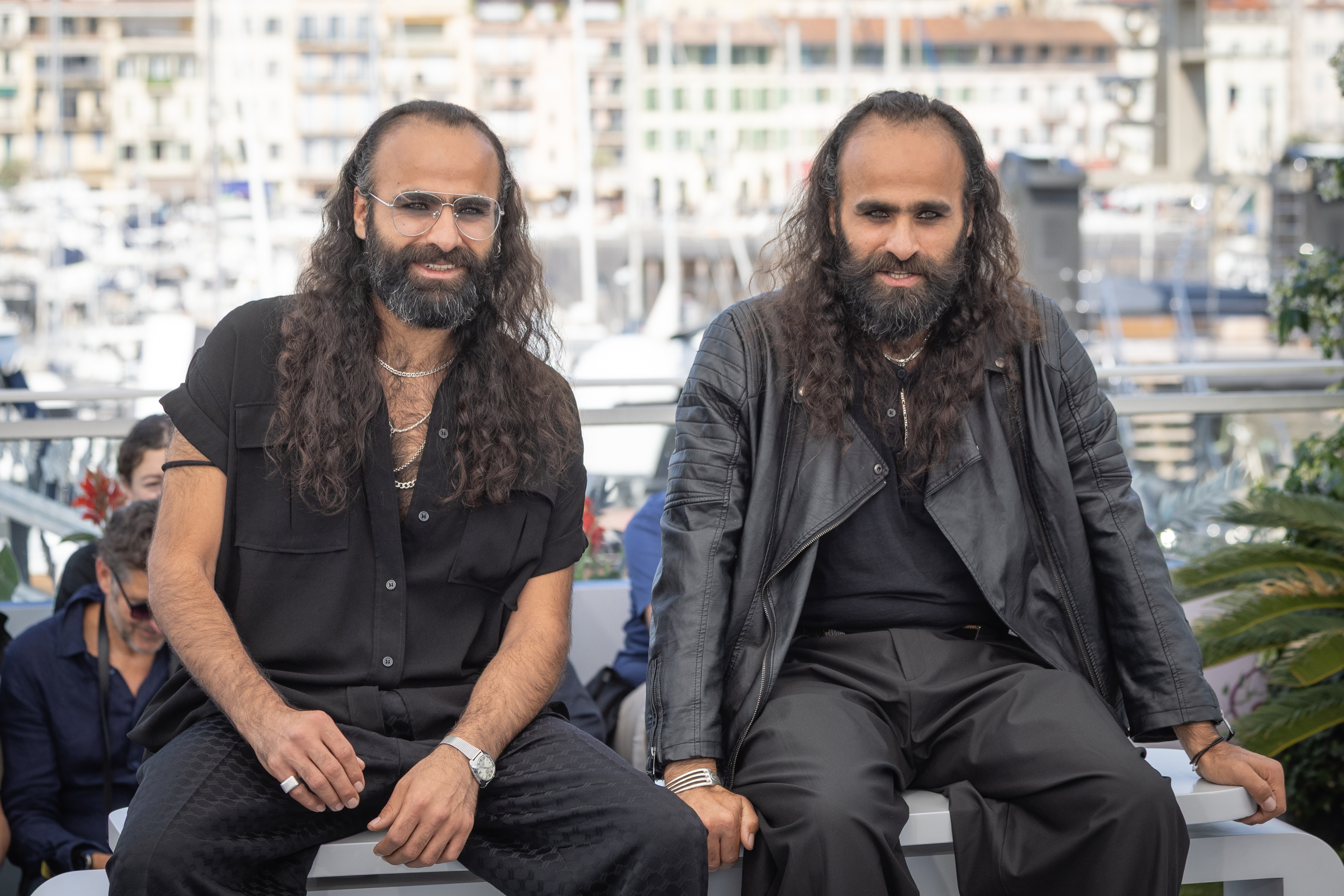
Tarzan (right) and Arab Nasser at the Cannes Film Festival 2025

Tarzan Nasser and Arab Nasser are the professional pseudonyms of Ahmed and Mohamed Abunasser, identical twin artists and film directors from Palestine. They are most noted for their 2020 film Gaza mon amour.

Born in the Gaza Strip in 1988, they studied art prior to delving into film despite a lack of any formal training. They directed a number of short films in their early career, with their 2013 film Condom Lead screening at the 2013 Cannes Film Festival as the first film by Gazan Palestinians ever accepted into the festival. They moved to Amman, Jordan, early in their careers due to the Blockade of the Gaza Strip.

Their feature film debut, Dégradé, premiered at the 2015 Cannes Film Festival.

Gaza mon amour premiered at the 2020 Venice Film Festival. It was subsequently screened at the 2020 Toronto International Film Festival, where it was named the winner of the NETPAC Award for best Asian film at the festival. It was selected as the Palestinian entry for the Best International Feature Film at the 93rd Academy Awards, but it was not nominated.

Their third feature film, Once Upon a Time in Gaza, had its world premiere in the Un Certain Regard program at the 2025 Cannes Film Festival, where they won the Best Director prize.

== Filmography ==
- Colourful Journey - 2010
- Condom Lead - 2013
- With Premeditation - 2014
- Apartment 10/14 - 2014
- Dégradé - 2015
- Gaza mon amour - 2020
- Once Upon a Time in Gaza - 2025
