= The Colour of Ink =

- Directed by: Brian D. Johnson
- Written by: Brian D. Johnson
- Produced by: Brian D. Johnson; Lea Marin
- Starring: Jason S. Logan
- Cinematography: Nicholas de Pencier
- Edited by: Robert Kennedy
- Music by: Don Kerr
- Production companies: National Film Board of Canada; Sphinx Productions
- Release date: September 15, 2022 (TIFF)
- Running time: 90 minutes
- Country: Canada
- Language: English

The Colour of Ink is a Canadian documentary film, directed by Brian D. Johnson and released in 2022. The film centres on Jason Logan, an artist and graphic designer who travels extensively to make homemade inks with natural and wild ingredients.

Besides Logan, the film shows the work of inkmakers Thomas Little and Marta Abott, and looks at how ink is used by a variety of artists, writers, and calligraphers including Kōji Kakinuma, Liana Finck, Soraya Syed, Yuri Shimojo, Corey Bulpitt, Roxx, and Margaret Atwood.

The film premiered at the 2022 Toronto International Film Festival on September 15, 2022.

Nicholas de Pencier won the Canadian Screen Award for Best Cinematography in a Documentary at the 11th Canadian Screen Awards in 2023.
