= Black Bodies (film) =

2020 Canadian short film

- Film poster
- Directed by: Kelly Fyffe-Marshall
- Written by: Kelly Fyffe-Marshall
- Produced by: Tamar Bird; Sasha Leigh Henry
- Starring: Donisha Prendergast; Komi-Oluwa Olafimihan
- Cinematography: Jordan Oram
- Production company: Sunflower Studios
- Release date: September 11, 2020 (TIFF)
- Running time: 5 minutes
- Country: Canada
- Language: English

Black Bodies is a 2020 Canadian short film, directed by Kelly Fyffe-Marshall, and produced by Tamar Bird and Sasha Leigh Henry. Inspired by a real-life incident when Fyffe-Marshall, Komi Olaf and Donisha Prendergast were travelling in California, and a woman in the neighbourhood called the police on them because she wrongly believed they were burglarizing their Airbnb rental, the film features Olaf and Prendergast performing spoken word pieces about the trauma of being victimized by anti-Black racism.

The film premiered at the 2020 Toronto International Film Festival, where Fyffe-Marshall was named the winner of the inaugural Changemaker Award.

The film was named to TIFF's year-end Canada's Top Ten list for short films. Fyffe-Marshall was subsequently awarded the Jay Scott Prize by the Toronto Film Critics Association.

The film won the Canadian Screen Award for Best Live Action Short Drama at the 9th Canadian Screen Awards.

The film has been released to digital platforms as a bonus feature accompanying Charles Officer's feature film Akilla's Escape.

== Cast ==
- Komi Olaf
- Donisha Rita Claire Prendergast
