= 2022 Toronto International Film Festival =

47th edition of Canadian film festival

- Festival poster
- Opening film: The Swimmers by Sally El Hosaini
- Closing film: Dalíland by Mary Harron
- Location: Toronto, Ontario, Canada
- Founded: 1976
- Awards: The Fabelmans (People's Choice Award)
- Festival date: September 8–18, 2022
- Website: tiff.net/tiff

Toronto International Film Festival
- 2023 2021

The 47th annual Toronto International Film Festival was held from September 8 to 18, 2022.

The 2022 festival was staged primarily in-person; a small selection of films were offered on the Digital TIFF Bell Lightbox platform, but this represented a much smaller proportion of the overall lineup than in 2020 and 2021. The festival also saw the return of its networking and gala events, which were also suspended or held virtually in 2020 and 2021 due to the COVID-19 pandemic in Toronto.

As of mid-July, the festival had diverged from its usual practice of releasing a list of ten or twenty films to start its programming announcements, and instead issued a number of single-film announcements, before finally releasing its first extended list of the full gala and special presentations programs on July 28. Additional films were announced throughout August, until the full schedule was released on August 23. Festival CEO Cameron Bailey indicated that the full lineup would comprise around 200 feature films and about 40 short films, the largest lineup the festival has booked since the pre-pandemic 2019 edition.

Sally El Hosaini's The Swimmers was the opening film, and the closing film was Mary Harron's Dalíland. The Fabelmans, which screened as a special presentation and won the People's Choice Award, marked the first time in history that a Steven Spielberg film premiered at the festival. Jordan Peele's Nope, although already released in theaters prior to the festival, was also screened in IMAX at the Cinesphere as a special presentation in the main festival slate.

The festival also indicated that in light of the 2022 Russian invasion of Ukraine, state-backed Russian films and organizations would be banned from the festival, although participation by independent Russian filmmakers would still be permitted.

In 2023, festival organizers announced that the 2022 festival had returned to levels of in-person attendance comparable to the festivals prior to 2020.

== Awards ==
=== TIFF Tribute Awards ===
The TIFF Tribute Awards, the festival's program of honouring film personnel for their overall achievements in cinema, were presented early during the festival run.

The cast of My Policeman—Harry Styles, Emma Corrin, Gina McKee, Linus Roache, David Dawson, and Rupert Everett—were named as the recipients of one of the two awards for actors, marking the first time the award has been presented to an ensemble cast rather than an individual, while Sam Mendes has been named as the recipient of the Director Award. Brendan Fraser received a Tribute Award for Performance in The Whale.

Composer Hildur Guðnadóttir was named the recipient of the Variety Artisan Award, Sally El Hosaini was named the winner of the Emerging Talent Award, Buffy Sainte-Marie was the recipient of the Jeff Skoll Award in Impact Media, and Michelle Yeoh was named the winner of the inaugural Share Her Journey Groundbreaker Award.

=== Regular Awards ===
The festival's main awards for films in the festival program, including the People's Choice Award, were presented on September 18.

Awards	English title	Director	Production country
People's Choice Award	The Fabelmans	Steven Spielberg	United States
People's Choice Award, First Runner Up	Women Talking	Sarah Polley	United States
People's Choice Award, Second Runner Up	Glass Onion: A Knives Out Mystery	Rian Johnson	United States
People's Choice Award: Documentaries	Black Ice	Hubert Davis	Canada
Documentary, First Runner Up	Maya and the Wave	Stephanie Johnes	United States
Documentary, Second Runner Up	752 Is Not a Number	Babak Payami	Canada
People's Choice Award: Midnight Madness	Weird: The Al Yankovic Story	Eric Appel	United States
Midnight Madness, First Runner Up	Pearl	Ti West	United States
Midnight Madness, Second Runner Up	The Blackening	Tim Story	United States
Platform Prize	Riceboy Sleeps	Anthony Shim	Canada
Best Canadian Feature Film	To Kill a Tiger	Nisha Pahuja	Canada
Best Canadian Film, Honorable Mention	Viking	Stéphane Lafleur	Canada
Best Canadian Short Film	Simo	Aziz Zoromba	Canada
Best Canadian Short Film, Honorable Mention	Same Old	Lloyd Lee Choi	Canada, United States
Best International Short Film	Snow in September	Lkhagvadulam Purev-Ochir	Mongolia, France
Best International Short Film, Honorable Mention	Airhostess-737	Thanasis Neofotistos	Greece
FIPRESCI Award	A Gaza Weekend	Basil Khalil	Palestine, United Kingdom
NETPAC Award	Sweet As	Jub Clerc	Australia
Amplify Voices	Leonor Will Never Die	Martika Ramirez Escobar	Philippines
Amplify Voices	While We Watched	Vinay Shukla	India
Amplify Voices, Honorable Mention	Buffy Sainte-Marie: Carry It On	Madison Thomas	Canada
Changemaker Award	Something You Said Last Night	Luis De Filippis	Canada
Share Her Journey	Nanitic	Carol Nguyen	Canada

== Programme ==
=== Gala Presentations ===
English title	Original title	Director(s)	Production country
Alice, Darling		Mary Nighy	United States, Canada
Black Ice		Hubert Davis	Canada
Butcher's Crossing		Gabe Polsky	United States
Dalíland		Mary Harron	United States
The Greatest Beer Run Ever		Peter Farrelly	United States
The Hummingbird	Il colibrì	Francesca Archibugi	Italy, France
Hunt	헌트	Lee Jung-jae	South Korea
A Jazzman's Blues		Tyler Perry	United States
Kacchey Limbu		Shubham Yogi	India
Moving On		Paul Weitz	United States
Paris Memories	Revoir Paris	Alice Winocour	France
Prisoner's Daughter		Catherine Hardwicke	United States
Raymond and Ray		Rodrigo García	United States
Roost		Amy Redford	United States
Sidney		Reginald Hudlin	United States
The Son		Florian Zeller	United Kingdom
The Swimmers		Sally El Hosaini	United Kingdom
What's Love Got to Do with It?		Shekhar Kapur	United Kingdom
The Woman King		Gina Prince-Bythewood	United States

=== Special Presentations ===
English title	Original title	Director(s)	Production country
Allelujah		Richard Eyre	United Kingdom
All Quiet on the Western Front		Edward Berger	Germany
The Banshees of Inisherin		Martin McDonagh	United Kingdom, Ireland, United States
Biosphere		Mel Eslyn	United States
Blueback		Robert Connolly	Australia
The Blue Caftan	Le Bleu du Caftan	Maryam Touzani	Morocco, France, Belgium, Denmark
Broker	브로커	Hirokazu Kore-eda	South Korea
Bros		Nicholas Stoller	United States
Brother		Clement Virgo	Canada
Catherine Called Birdy		Lena Dunham	United Kingdom
Causeway		Lila Neugebauer	United States
Chevalier		Stephen Williams	United States
Corsage		Marie Kreutzer	Austria, France, Germany
Decision to Leave		Park Chan-wook	South Korea
Devotion		J. D. Dillard	United States
Driving Madeleine	Une belle course	Christian Carion	France
Elesin Oba, The King's Horseman		Biyi Bandele	Nigeria
Empire of Light		Sam Mendes	United Kingdom
The Eternal Daughter		Joanna Hogg	United Kingdom
The Fabelmans		Steven Spielberg	United States
Glass Onion: A Knives Out Mystery		Rian Johnson	United States
Good Night Oppy		Ryan White	United States
The Good Nurse		Tobias Lindholm	United States
Holy Spider		Ali Abbasi	Denmark, Germany, Sweden, France
Joyland		Saim Sadiq	Pakistan
The Lost King		Stephen Frears	United Kingdom
A Man of Reason		Jung Woo-sung	South Korea
The Menu		Mark Mylod	United States
Moonage Daydream		Brett Morgen	United States
My Policeman		Michael Grandage	United Kingdom
Nanny		Nikyatu Jusu	United States
No Bears		Jafar Panahi	Iran
Nope		Jordan Peele	United States
On the Come Up		Sanaa Lathan	United States
One Fine Morning	Un beau matin	Mia Hansen-Løve	France
Other People's Children	Les enfants des autres	Rebecca Zlotowski	France
The Return of Tanya Tucker: Featuring Brandi Carlisle		Kathlyn Horan	United States
Saint Omer		Alice Diop	France
Sanctuary		Zachary Wigon	United States
Stories Not to Be Told	Historias para no contar	Cesc Gay	Spain
The Substitute	El Suplente	Diego Lerman	Argentina, Italy, Mexico, Spain, France
Triangle of Sadness		Ruben Östlund	Sweden, United Kingdom, United States, France
Walk Up	탑	Hong Sang-soo	South Korea
Wendell & Wild		Henry Selick	United States
The Whale		Darren Aronofsky	United States
Women Talking		Sarah Polley	United States
The Wonder		Sebastián Lelio	United Kingdom, Ireland

=== Contemporary World Cinema ===
Ulrich Seidl's Sparta was withdrawn by the festival after allegations of child exploitation on set surfaced.

English title	Original title	Director(s)	Production country
Aftersun		Charlotte Wells	United Kingdom, United States
Alam		Firas Khoury	France, Palestine, Tunisia, Saudi Arabia, Qatar
Amanda		Carolina Cavalli	Italy
Ashkal		Youssef Chebbi	France, Tunisia, Qatar
Autobiography		Makbul Mubarak	Indonesia, France, Singapore, Poland, Philippines, Germany, Qatar
Beyond the Wall	شب، داخلی، دیوار	Vahid Jalilvand	Iran
Blind Willow, Sleeping Woman	Saules aveugles, femme endormie	Pierre Fӧldes	Canada, France
Bones of Crows		Marie Clements	Canada
Coyote	Le Coyote	Katherine Jerkovic	Canada
Domingo and the Mist	Domingo y La Niebla	Ariel Escalante Meza	Costa Rica, Qatar
The End of Sex		Sean Garrity	Canada
EO		Jerzy Skolimowski	Poland, Italy
Falcon Lake		Charlotte Le Bon	Canada, France
Fixation		Mercedes Bryce Morgan	Canada, United States, Germany
Godland	Vanskabte Land/Volaða Land	Hlynur Pálmason	Denmark, Iceland, France, Sweden
The Happiest Man in the World	Najsreќniot Čovek na Svetot	Teona Strugar Mitevska	Netherlands, Macedoniam, Belgium, Slovenia, Denmark, Croatia, Bosnia
The Hotel	旅馆	Wang Xiaoshuai	Hong Kong
The Pack	La Jauría	Andrés Ramírez Pulido	Colombia, France
Life	Жизнь	Emir Baigazin	Kazakhstan
Living		Oliver Hermanus	United Kingdom
Love & Mathematics	Amor y Matemáticas	Claudia Sainte-Luce	Mexico
Love Life		Koji Fukada	Japan, France
Luxembourg, Luxembourg	ЛЮКСЕМБУРГ, ЛЮКСЕМБУРГ	Antonio Lukich	Ukraine
The Maiden		Graham Foy	Canada
Manticore	Mantícora	Carlos Vermut	Spain
Muru		Tearepa Kahi	New Zealand
My Sailor, My Love		Klaus Härö	Finland, Ireland
Nightalk		Donald Shebib	Canada
North of Normal		Carly Stone	Canada
The Origin of Evil	L'Origine du mal	Sébastien Marnier	Canada, France
Plan 75		Chie Hayakawa	Japan, France, Philippines, Qatar
Return to Dust	隐入尘烟	Li Ruijun	China
R.M.N.		Cristian Mungiu	Romania, France
So Much Tenderness		Lina Rodriguez	Canada
Stellar		Darlene Naponse	Canada
Stonewalling		Huang Ji, Ryuji Otsuka	Japan
The Swearing Jar		Lindsay MacKay	Canada
The Umbrella Men		John Barker	South Africa
Under the Fig Trees	Taht El Shajara	Erige Sehiri	Tunisia, Switzerland, France, Qatar
Valeria Is Getting Married	Valeria Mithatenet	Michal Vinik	Israel
Victim	OBEŤ	Michal Blaško	Slovakia, Czech Republic, Germany
Vicenta B.		Carlos Lechuga	Cuba, France, United States, Colombia, Norway
War Sailor	Krigsseileren	Gunnar Vikene	Norway, Germany
The Water	El agua	Elena López Riera	Switzerland, Spain, France
We Are Still Here		Beck Cole, Dena Curtis, Tracey Rigney, Danielle MacLean, Tim Worrall, Renae Maihi, Miki Magasiva, Mario Gaoa, Richard Curtis, Chantelle Burgoyne	Australia, New Zealand
Wildflower		Matt Smukler	United States
Winter Boy	Le Lycéen	Christophe Honoré	France
The Worst Ones		Romane Gueret	France
Zwigato		Nandita Das	India

=== TIFF Docs ===
English title	Original title	Director(s)	Production country
752 Is Not a Number		Babak Payami	Canada
All the Beauty and the Bloodshed		Laura Poitras	United States
Buffy Sainte-Marie: Carry It On		Madison Thomas	Canada
Casa Susanna		Sébastien Lifshitz	France, United States
Ciné-Guerrillas: Scenes from the Labudovic Reels		Mila Turajlic	Serbia, France, Croatia, Montenegro
The Colour of Ink		Brian D. Johnson	Canada
Documentary Now! (episodes: "My Monkey Grifter", "Trouver Frisson" [Finding Frisson], "Two Hairdressers In Bagglyport")		Alex Buono, Rhys Thomas, Micah Gardner	United States
Ever Deadly		Chelsea McMullan, Tanya Tagaq	Canada
Free Money		Sam Soko, Lauren DeFilippo	Kenya, United States
The Grab		Gabriela Cowperthwaite	United States
In Her Hands		Tamana Ayazi, Marcel Mettelsiefen	United States, Afghanistan
Louis Armstrong's Black & Blues		Sacha Jenkins	United States
Mariupolis 2		Mantas Kvedaravičius	Lithuania, France, Germany
Maya and the Wave		Stephanie Johnes	United States
Miúcha, The Voice of Bossa Nova		Daniel Zarvos, Liliane Mutti	Brazil, France
My Imaginary Country	Mi País Imaginario	Patricio Guzmán	Chile, France
Patrick and the Whale		Mark Fletcher	Australia
Pray for Our Sinners		Sinéad O'Shea	Ireland
Self-Portrait as a Coffee Pot		William Kentridge	South Africa, United States
Theatre of Thought		Werner Herzog	United States
To Kill a Tiger		Nisha Pahuja	Canada
While We Watched		Vinay Shukla	United Kingdom

=== Discovery ===
English title	Original title	Director(s)	Production country
Aristotle and Dante Discover the Secrets of the Universe		Aitch Alberto	United States
Baby Ruby		Bess Wohl	United States
Bruiser		Miles Warren	United States
Carmen		Benjamin Millepied	Australia, France
Daughter of Rage	La Hija de todas las Rabias	Laura Baumeister	Nicaragua, Mexico, the Netherlands, Germany, France, Norway
A Gaza Weekend		Basil Khalil	United Kingdom, Palestine
I Like Movies		Chandler Levack	Canada
The Inspection		Elegance Bratton	United States
A Long Break	დიდი შესვენება	Davit Pirtskhalava	Georgia
Return to Seoul	Retour à Seoul	Davy Chou	South Korea, France, Germany, Belgium
Rosie		Gail Maurice	Canada
Runner		Marian Mathias	United States, France, Germany
Shimoni		Angela Wanjiku Wamai	Kenya
Snow and the Bear	Kar ve Ayı	Selcen Ergun	Turkey, Germany, Serbia
Soft		Joseph Amenta	Canada
Something You Said Last Night		Luis De Filippis	Canada, Switzerland
Susie Searches		Sophie Kargman	United States
Sweet As		Jub Clerc	Australia
The Taste of Apples Is Red	Ta'am al Tufah, Ahmar	Ehab Tarabieh	Israel, Germany
This Place		V.T. Nayani	Canada
Unruly	Ustyrlig	Malou Reymann	Denmark
Until Branches Bend		Sophie Jarvis	Canada
When Morning Comes		Kelly Fyffe-Marshall	Canada, Jamaica
The Young Arsonists		Sheila Pye	Canada

=== Platform ===
English title	Original title	Director(s)	Production country
Charcoal	Carvão	Carolina Markowicz	Brazil, Argentina
Emily		Frances O'Connor	United Kingdom, United States
The Gravity	La Gravité	Cédric Ido	France
Hawa		Maïmouna Doucouré	France
How to Blow Up a Pipeline		Daniel Goldhaber	United States
Riceboy Sleeps		Anthony Shim	Canada
Subtraction	تفریق	Mani Haghighi	Iran, France
Thunder	Foudre	Carmen Jaquier	Switzerland
Tora's Husband		Rima Das	India
Viking		Stéphane Lafleur	Canada

=== Midnight Madness ===
Following its premiere on September 14, TIFF was forced to cancel followup screenings of Vera Drew's film The People's Joker following a rights conflict with Warner Bros. over the film's unauthorized use of The Joker.

English title	Original title	Director(s)	Production country
The Blackening		Tim Story	United States
Sisu		Jalmari Helander	Finland
Leonor Will Never Die		Martika Ramirez Escobar	Philippines
Pearl		Ti West	United States
The People's Joker		Vera Drew	United States
Project Wolf Hunting	늑대사냥	Kim Hong-sun	South Korea
Sick		John Hyams	United States
Venus		Jaume Balagueró	Spain
V/H/S/99		Flying Lotus, Johannes Roberts, Maggie Levin, Tyler MacIntyre, Vanessa and Joseph Winter	United States
Weird: The Al Yankovic Story		Eric Appel	United States

=== Primetime ===
English title	Original title	Director(s)	Production country
1899		Baran bo Odar, Jantje Friese	Germany
Dear Mama		Allen Hughes	United States
The Handmaid's Tale (Season 5)		Bruce Miller, Elisabeth Moss	United States
High School		Clea DuVall, Laura Kittrell	United States, Canada
The Kingdom Exodus		Lars von Trier	Denmark
Lido TV		Lido Pimienta, Sean O'Neill	Canada
Mystery Road: Origin		Dylan River	Australia

=== Short Cuts ===
English title	Original title	Director(s)	Production country
À la vie à l'amor		Émilie Mannering	Canada
Against Reality		Olivia Peace	United States
Airhostess-737		Thanasis Neofotistos	Greece
All-Inclusive	Todo incluido	Duván Duque Vargas	Colombia, France
Anastasia	Анастасия	Sarah McCarthy	United Kingdom
Baba		Mbithi Masya	Kenya
Backflip		Nikita Diakur	Germany, France
Canary		Pierre-Hugues Dallaire, Benoit Therriault	Canada
The Chase		Gurjeet Kaur Bassi	Canada
Diaspora		Tyler Mckenzie Evans	Canada
The Flying Sailor	Le Matelot volant	Wendy Tilby and Amanda Forbis	Canada
The Garbage Man	O Homem do Lixo	Laura Gonçalves	Portugal
Gary Screams for You		Cody McGlashan, Nolan Sordyl	United States
Hills and Mountains		Salar Pashtoonyar	Canada
I'm on Fire		Michael Spiccia	United States, Australia
It's What Each Person Needs		Sophy Romvari	Canada
Ice Merchants		João Gonzalez	Portugal, France, United Kingdom
Lay Me by the Shore		David Findlay	Canada
Liturgy of Anti-Tank Obstacles	Літургія протитанкових перешкод	Dmytro Sukholytkyy-Sobchuk	Ukraine, United States
Municipal Relaxation Module		Matthew Rankin	Canada
The Melting Creatures	Las criaturas que se derriten bajo el sol	Diego Céspedes	Chile, France
Mirror, Mirror		Sanduela Asanda	South Africa
Nanitic		Carol Nguyen	Canada
No Ghost in the Morgue		Marilyn Cooke	Canada
N’xaxaitkw		Asia Youngman	Canada
The Pass		Pepi Ginsberg	United States
Pleasure Garden		Rita Ferrando	Canada
Le pupille		Alice Rohrwacher	Italy, United States
Quiet Minds Silent Streets		Karen Chapman	Canada
Rest Stop		Crystal Kayiza	United States
Same Old		Lloyd Lee Choi	Canada
Scaring Women at Night		Karimah Zakia Issa	Canada
Shadow of the Butterflies	خيال الفراشات	Sofia El Khyari	France, Qatar, Portugal
She Always Wins		Hazel McKibbin	United States
Simo		Aziz Zoromba	Canada
Snow in September	9-р Сарын Цас	Lkhagvadulam Purev-Ochir	Mongolia, France
Tremor	Beben	Rudolf Fitzgerald Leonard	Germany
Untold Hours		Daniel Warth	Canada
The Water Murmurs	海边升起一座悬崖	Jianying Chen	China

=== Wavelengths ===
English title	Original title	Director(s)	Production country
After Work		Céline Condorelli, Ben Rivers	United Kingdom
Bigger on the Inside		Angelo Madsen Minax	United States
Concrete Valley		Antoine Bourges	Canada
De Humani Corporis Fabrica		Véréna Paravel, Lucien Castaing-Taylor	France, Switzerland
Dry Ground Burning	Mato seco em chamas	Joana Pimenta, Adirley Queirós	Portugal, Brazil
Eventide		Sharon Lockhart	United States
F1ghting Looks Different 2 Me Now		Fox Maxy	United States
Fata Morgana		Tacita Dean	United Kingdom, United States
Hors-titre		Wiame Haddad	France
Horse Opera		Moyra Davey	United States
I Thought the World of You		Kurt Walker	Canada
Life on the CAPS		Meriem Bennani	United States
Moonrise		Vincent Grenier	Canada, United States
The Newest Olds		Pablo Mazzolo	Argentina, Canada
Pacifiction	Tourment sur les îles	Albert Serra	France, Spain, Germany, Portugal
Puerta a Puerta		Jessica Sarah Rinland, Luis Arnías	Mexico, United States
Queens of the Qing Dynasty		Ashley McKenzie	Canada
The Time That Separates Us		Parastoo Anoushahpour	Canada, Jordan, Palestine
Unrest	Unrueh	Cyril Schäublin	Switzerland
What Rules the Invisible		Tiffany Sia	United States
Will-o'-the-Wisp	Fogo-Fátuo	João Pedro Rodrigues	Portugal, France

=== Festival at Home ===
A selection of films from the above programs that was available for home viewing through the Digital TIFF Bell Lightbox platform.

English title	Original title	Director(s)	Production country
Aristotle and Dante Discover the Secrets of the Universe		Aitch Alberto	United States
Casa Susanna		Sébastien Lifshitz	France, United States
The Colour of Ink		Brian D. Johnson	Canada
Concrete Valley		Antoine Bourges	Canada
Coyote		Katherine Jerkovic	Canada
The End of Sex		Sean Garrity	Canada
Ever Deadly		Chelsea McMullan, Tanya Tagaq	Canada
The Grab		Gabriela Cowperthwaite	United States
Joyland		Saim Sadiq	Pakistan
Luxembourg, Luxembourg	ЛЮКСЕМБУРГ, ЛЮКСЕМБУРГ	Antonio Lukich	Ukraine
Pray for Our Sinners		Sinéad O'Shea	Ireland
Shimoni		Angela Wanjiku Wamai	Kenya
Sick		John Hyams	United States
Soft		Joseph Amenta	Canada
Susie Searches		Sophie Kargman	United States
Theatre of Thought		Werner Herzog	United States
This Place		V.T. Nayani	Canada
Tora's Husband		Rima Das	India
The Umbrella Men		John Barker	South Africa
Under the Fig Trees	Taht El Shajara	Erige Sehiri	Tunisia, Switzerland, France, Qatar
Unruly	Ustyrlig	Malou Reymann	Denmark
Vicenta B.		Carlos Lechuga	Cuba, France, United States, Colombia, Norway
We Are Still Here		Beck Cole, Dena Curtis, Tracey Rigney, Danielle MacLean, Tim Worrall, Renae Maihi, Miki Magasiva, Mario Gaoa, Richard Curtis, Chantelle Burgoyne	Australia, New Zealand
When Morning Comes		Kelly Fyffe-Marshall	Canada, Jamaica

=== Industry Selects ===
Films that were available for screening by film buyers and industry professionals, but not open to the general public.

English title	Original title	Director(s)	Production country
Blue Jean		Georgia Oakley	United Kingdom
Driving Mum	Á ferð með mömmu	Hilmar Oddsson	Iceland
Dreamin' Wild		Bill Pohlad	United States
Door Mouse		Avan Jogia	Canada
Harka		Lotfy Nathan	United States, France, Tunisia, Luxembourg, Belgium
The Listener		Steve Buscemi	United States
The Kings of the World	Los Reyes del mundo	Laura Mora	Colombia, Luxembourg, France, Mexico, Norway
Klokkenluider		Neil Maskell	United Kingdom
Salt Lake		Kasia Rosłaniec	Poland, Sweden
Without Her	بی رویا	Arian Vazirdaftari	Iran

=== Festival Street ===
Older movies that were shown at the OLG Cinema Park, an open-air cinema run by TIFF at David Pecaut Square. Many featured actors and/or directors involved with TIFF 2022 selections.

English title	Director(s)	Year	Production country
10 Things I Hate About You	Gil Junger	1999	United States
The Greatest Showman	Michael Gracey	2017	United States
A League of Their Own	Penny Marshall	1992	United States
Love & Basketball	Gina Prince-Bythewood	2000	United States
The Mummy	Stephen Sommers	1999	United States
The NeverEnding Story	Wolfgang Petersen	1984	United States
School of Rock	Richard Linklater	2003	United States
Sister Act	Emile Ardolino	1992	United States
UHF	Jay Levey	1989	United States
West Side Story	Steven Spielberg	2021	United States

=== TIFF Cinematheque ===
English title	Original title	Director(s)	Year	Production country
I Shot Andy Warhol		Mary Harron	1996	United Kingdom, United States
The Stranger	Agantuk	Satyajit Ray	1991	India, France
Strictly Ballroom		Baz Luhrmann	1992	Australia, United Kingdom
Tales from the Gimli Hospital Redux		Guy Maddin	1991	Canada
Werckmeister Harmonies	Werckmeister harmóniák	Béla Tarr, Ágnes Hranitzky	2000	Hungary, Italy, Germany, France

== Canada's Top Ten ==
The festival's annual year-end Canada's Top Ten list, collecting the films named as the top Canadian films of the year by critics and film festival programmers from across Canada, was released on December 8, 2022.

=== Feature films ===
- Black Ice — Hubert Davis
- Brother — Clement Virgo
- Crimes of the Future — David Cronenberg
- I Like Movies — Chandler Levack
- Riceboy Sleeps — Anthony Shim
- Rosie — Gail Maurice
- Something You Said Last Night — Luis De Filippis
- This House (Cette maison) — Miryam Charles
- To Kill a Tiger — Nisha Pahuja
- Viking — Stéphane Lafleur

=== Short films ===
- Belle River — Guillaume Fournier, Samuel Matteau, Yannick Nolin
- Bill Reid Remembers — Alanis Obomsawin
- The Flying Sailor — Wendy Tilby, Amanda Forbis
- Lay Me by the Shore — David Findlay
- Municipal Relaxation Module — Matthew Rankin
- Nanitic — Carol Nguyen
- No Ghost in the Morgue — Marilyn Cooke
- Same Old — Lloyd Lee Choi
- Simo — Aziz Zoromba
- Violet Gave Willingly — Claire Sanford
