= Company 3 TFCA Luminary Award =

Canadian film award

The Company 3 TFCA Luminary Award, formerly the Clyde Gilmour Award, is an annual award, presented at the discretion of the Toronto Film Critics Association as a lifetime achievement award for distinguished contributions to the Canadian film industry. Originally named in memory of Canadian broadcaster Clyde Gilmour, who was posthumously honoured as the award's first recipient, the award honours achievements in any part of the Canadian film industry, including direction, production, criticism, broadcasting and film festival programming, that have helped to enrich the understanding and appreciation of film in Canada.

Since 2013, the recipient has also been empowered to select an emerging filmmaker to a receive a "pay it forward" grant of $50,000 in post-production services toward the production of a forthcoming film. As the COVID-19 pandemic disrupted the presentation of the TFCA awards in 2020, no recipient of the "pay it forward" grant was announced that year; accordingly, the 2022 recipient of the Luminary Award was authorized to choose two "pay it forward" filmmakers to compensate for 2020.

== Recipients ==
Year	Luminary Award recipient	"Pay-it-forward" filmmaker	Ref
1997	Clyde Gilmour	not presented	
1998	Gerald Pratley	not presented	
1999	Elwy Yost	not presented	
2000	not presented		
2001	James Quandt	not presented	
2002	Wayne Clarkson	not presented	
2003	not presented		
2004	Kay Armatage	not presented	
2005	Robin Wood	not presented	
2006	Allan King	not presented	
2007	not presented		
2008	not presented		
2009	Mark Peranson	not presented	
2010	not presented		
2011	John Dunning	not presented	
2012	not presented		
2013	Norman Jewison	Jeff Barnaby	
2014	Piers Handling	Randall Okita	
2015	Deepa Mehta	Nisha Pahuja	
2016	Alanis Obomsawin	Amanda Strong	
2017	Zacharias Kunuk	Isabella Weetaluktuk	
2018	Tantoo Cardinal	Darlene Naponse	
2019	Michèle Maheux	Lina Rodriguez	
2020	Jason Ryle	not awarded	
2021	David Cronenberg	Kelly Fyffe-Marshall	
2022	Steve Gravestock	Hugh Gibson, Frieda Luk	
2023	Charles Officer	Thyrone Tommy	
2024	Tonya Williams	Leena Minifie	
2025	Ron Mann	Jacquelyn Mills	
