= Sasha Leigh Henry =

Canadian director and producer

Sasha Leigh Henry is a Canadian film and television director and producer, most noted as the creator of the comedy series Bria Mack Gets a Life.

A graduate of the University of Waterloo, she subsequently participated in various media training and networking programs. She has directed the short films Love Bent (2014), To Love and Back (2016), Bitches Love Brunch (2018) and Sinking Ship (2020), and was a producer of Kelly Fyffe-Marshall's films Black Bodies (2020) and When Morning Comes (2022). Black Bodies won the Canadian Screen Award for Best Live Action Short Drama at the 9th Canadian Screen Awards.

She has also been a writer and story editor for the television sitcom Workin' Moms. Henry, Fyffe-Marshall, Tamar Bird and Iva Golubovic make up the Toronto- and Brampton-based production company, Sunflower Studios.

Her feature-length debut, Dinner with Friends, premiered in the Discovery program at the 2025 Toronto International Film Festival.
