= Lkhagvadulam Purev-Ochir =

Mongolian film director

- Occupations: Writer and director
- Years active: 2018-present

Lkhagvadulam Purev-Ochir is a Mongolian film director. She is most noted for her 2022 short film Snow in September (9-р Сарын Цас), which was the winner of the Orizzonti award for Best Short Film at the 79th Venice International Film Festival and the award for Best International Short Film at the 2022 Toronto International Film Festival.

Her debut short film, Mountain Cat (Shiluus), was screened in the short films competition at the 2020 Cannes Film Festival, and won the Sonje Award for Best Asian Short Film at the 25th Busan International Film Festival.

Her debut feature film, City of Wind (сэр сэр салхи), was screened in the Orizzonti program at the 80th Venice International Film Festival, and screened at the Centrepiece program at the 2023 Toronto International Film Festival, and at the 28th Busan International Film Festival in 'A Window on Asian Cinema' section.

== Filmography ==
=== Short films ===
Year	Title	Director	Writer	Notes
2018	MyLissa	No	Yes	
2020	Mountain Cat (Shiluus)	Yes	Yes	Screened at Cannes
2022	Snow in September (9-р Сарын Цас)	Yes	Yes	Premiered at Venice
2025	A South-Facing Window (Une fenêtre plein sud)	Yes	Yes	Premiered at Locarno

=== Feature films ===
Year	Title	Director	Writer	Notes
2023	City of Wind (сэр сэр салхи)	Yes	Yes	World premiere at the Orizzonti of the Venice.
