= Roxx =

British-born American tattoo artist

Roxx (née Roxanne) is a British-born American tattoo artist, based in Los Angeles, California. She is known for recognizable blackout and blackwork tattoos, and for her work with celebrity clients including Machine Gun Kelly and Ricky Martin.

Roxx's work was included in the Museum of Modern Art (MoMA) exhibit, Items: Is Fashion Modern? (2018), her work is on the cover of Bodies of Subversion: A Secret History of Women and Tattoo (2013, 3rd revised ed.) by Margot Mifflin, and in Black Tattoo Art 2 (2013) by Marisa Kakoulas. She appeared in the documentary, The Colour of Ink (2022), discussing making her own ink and her artistic approach.

She does not work from templates and designs tattoos directly on clients' bodies. She has described her approach as spiritual or therapeutic for clients who are looking to mark a change or alter their relationship to their bodies. She was the founder and owner of 2Spirit Tattoo in San Francisco in 2004, which was later moved to Los Angeles. Roxx is of Persian, Dutch and German descent, and is a lesbian.
