= Kelly Fyffe-Marshall =

Canadian filmmaker

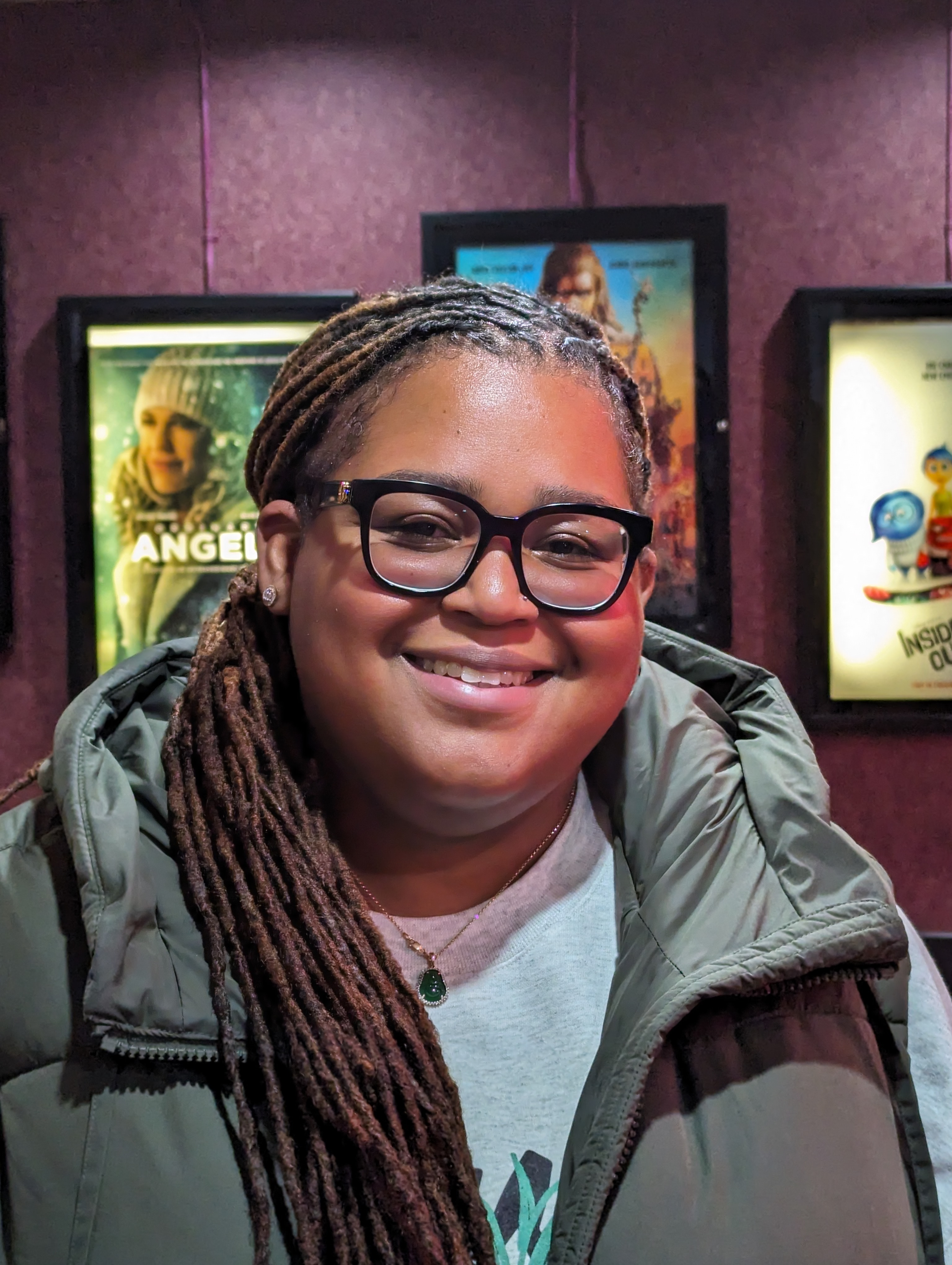
- Occupation: Filmmaker
- Years active: 2016–present
- Known for: Black Bodies

Kelly Fyffe-Marshall is a Canadian filmmaker best known for her 2020 two-part short film Black Bodies, which won the Changemaker Award at the 2020 Toronto International Film Festival, and won the Canadian Screen Award for Best Live Action Short Drama at the 9th Canadian Screen Awards in 2021.

== Career ==
She has also directed the short films Reason Enough (2016), Haven (2018), Black White Blue (2018) and Trap City (2020), and has worked as an assistant director and production assistant on other film and television projects. She is also the co-founder of the production company Sunflower Studios, with Sasha Leigh Henry, Tamar Bird, and Iva Golubovic.

Fyffe-Marshall won the Toronto Film Critics Association's Jay Scott Prize at the 2020 Toronto Film Critics Association Awards.

In May 2022, Fyffe-Marshall was selected by David Cronenberg as the recipient of the "pay-it-forward" grant from his Clyde Gilmour Award package, and received $50,000 in post-production services on her feature film When Morning Comes, which premiered in the Discovery program at the 2022 Toronto International Film Festival.

== Personal life ==
Fyffe-Marshall was born in England, and currently resides in Brampton, Ontario.

== Filmography ==
- Friends with Benefits (2016) – web series
- Reason Enough (2016) – short film
- Haven (2018) – short film
- Black White Blue (2018) – short film
- Trap City (2020) – short film
- Black Bodies (2020) – short film
- When Morning Comes (2022) – feature film
- Bria Mack Gets a Life (2023) – TV series
- Demons (2025) – short film
