= Money-Driven Medicine =

2009 film

- Directed by: Andrew Fredericks
- Written by: Maggie Mahar
- Produced by: Alex Gibney
- Distributed by: California Newsreel
- Release date: 2009
- Running time: 86 min.
- Country: United States
- Language: English

Money-Driven Medicine is a 2009 documentary film that offers a behind-the-scenes look at the American healthcare system. The 86 minute documentary explores the economics underlying, and often undermining, the $2.6 trillion US health care system. Produced by Alex Gibney and inspired by Maggie Mahar's book Money-Driven Medicine: The Real Reason Health Care Costs So Much, Money-Driven Medicine looks at how the United States spends twice as much per capita on healthcare as the average developed nation yet has worse outcomes by explaining that the United States is the only developed nation with a medical system that is largely unregulated and for profit. Money-Driven Medicine includes interviews of experts including Don Berwick, Administrator of the Centers for Medicare and Medicaid Services and former President and Chief Executive Officer of the Institute for Healthcare Improvement; James Weinstein of The Dartmouth Institute for Health Policy and Clinical Practice and bio-ethicist Larry Churchill of Vanderbilt University.
