= List of eligible festival winners for the Academy Award for Best International Feature Film =

Eligible festival winners for Best International Feature Film

Highlights
- Debut: 2026
- Elegible films: 7
- Nominations: none
- Oscar winners: none

Eligible festival winners have been considered for the Academy Award for Best International Feature Film for the first time in 2026. The award is handed out annually by the United States Academy of Motion Picture Arts and Sciences to a feature-length motion picture produced outside the United States that contains primarily non-English dialogue. It was not created until the 1956 Academy Awards, in which a competitive Academy Award of Merit, known as the Best Foreign Language Film Award, was created for non-English speaking films, and has been given annually since.

The Academy of Motion Picture Arts and Sciences (AMPAS) has invited the film industries of various countries to submit their best film for the Academy Award for Best International Feature Film every year since the award was created in 1956. Beginning with the 99th ceremony, rules were changed to the submission process allowing non-English-language films to be submitted if it wins a qualifying award at an international film festival. These festivals and its specific awards qualifiers will be: Berlinale (Golden Bear), Busan (Best Film Award), Cannes (Palme d'Or), Sundance (World Cinema Grand Jury Prize Dramatic and Documentary), Toronto (Platform Prize) and Venice (Golden Lion).

== Qualified films ==
Below is a list of the films that have been considered as eligible by year, and its respective Academy Awards ceremony:

Year (Ceremony)	Festival	Film title used in nomination	Original title	Language(s)	Director(s)	Result
2026 (99th)	Berlinale	Yellow Letters	Gelbe Briefe	Turkish	İlker Çatak	TBD
2026 (99th)	Busan	Midday Meal	غذای نیمروز	Persian	Majid Majidi	TBD
2026 (99th)	Cannes	Fjord (Note: Although automatically qualified under the category's new rules as the 2026 Cannes Film Festival Palme d'Or winner, Fjord was ultimately submitted as the Romanian entry.)		Norwegian, English, Romanian, Swedish	Cristian Mungiu	TBD
2026 (99th)	Sundance	Shame and Money	Hatixhja dhe Shabani	Albanian	Visar Morina	TBD
2026 (99th)	Sundance	To Hold a Mountain (Note: Although automatically qualified under the category's new rules as the 2026 Sundance Film Festival World Cinema Documentary winner, To Hold a Mountain was ultimately submitted as the Montenegrin entry.)	Planina	Montenegrin	Biljana Tutorov and Petar Glomazić	TBD
2026 (99th)	Toronto	Angh		Konyak, English	Theja Rio	TBD
2026 (99th)	Venice	Woman Unknown (Note: Although automatically qualified under the category's new rules as the 2026 Venice International Film Festival Golden Lion winner, Woman Unknown was ultimately submitted as the Danish entry.)	Kvinde ukendt	Danish	May el-Toukhy	TBD

== See also ==
- List of Academy Award winners and nominees for Best International Feature Film
- List of Academy Award-winning foreign language films
- World cinema
