= Maiken Baird =

American documentary film director and producer

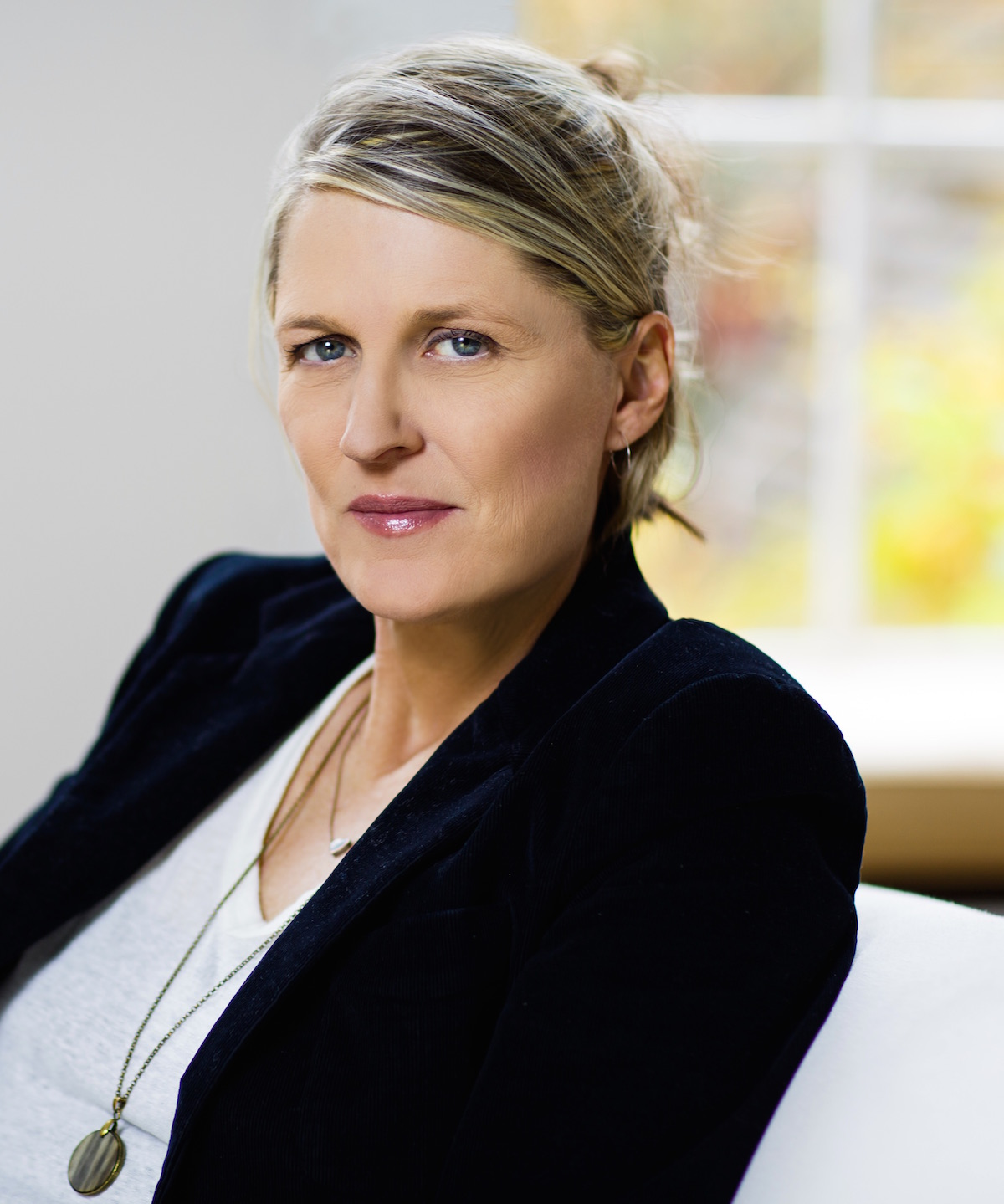
- Occupations: Director, producer
- Years active: 1995-present

Maiken Baird is a Danish-American documentary film director and producer. Baird co-directed with Michelle Major, Venus and Serena (2012), Ghislaine Maxwell: Filthy Rich (2022), and Edward Said: Between Worlds (2026). She has also served as an executive producer on multiple films including Icarus (2017), City of Ghosts (2017), Allen v. Farrow (2021), The First Wave (2021), The Grab (2022), Another Body (2023) and All That's Left of You (2025).

== Early life and career ==
Baird attended the Spence School and graduated in 1985. She later obtained a Bachelor of Arts degree in Political Science from Columbia University in 1989 and a Master's Degree in International Relations and Political Science from Stanford University in 1992.

Before her film career began, Baird worked at the United Nations, the European Union and the Royal Institute of International Affairs. Baird's first position working on documentary films was as a researcher at ABC News under Peter Jennings, where she first worked with her future co-director Michelle Majors. Baird later produced television documentaries for a variety of sources including New York Times Television, National Geographic Channel, A&E and MTV.

== Venus and Serena ==
Baird met and became friends with Michelle Major while working together for ABC News. The pair became interested in directing a documentary about the Williams sisters in 2007 and began pitching the project. After what Baird says were "countless meetings and hundreds of emails" the sisters allowed Baird and Major access to film them throughout 2011. The pair went on to film over 400 hours of footage over the course of the year. In 2013 Baird and Major became the target of a lawsuit by the United States Tennis Association over their use of unauthorized footage in the film. While Baird and Majors initially sought and received an invitation from the USTA to film at the 2011 US Open, the organization later claimed the pair had violated a five-minute limit to the use of licensed footage and presented a view of professional tennis which was "not in the best interest of the sport."

Baird and Major attributed the lawsuit to their use of footage of Serena Williams' 2009 outburst at the US Open. The filmmakers believed the USTA worried the footage would cast the organisation in a bad light. In a letter co-written with Major, Baird appealed to the tennis community for support in challenging what she called an "attempt to censor filmmakers" by the USTA. Baird and Major reached a confidential settlement with the organization in 2013 which allowed Venus and Serena to be released unedited.

== Producing and directing career ==
As a director, Baird co-directed alongside Lisa Bryant Ghislaine Maxwell: Filthy Rich for RadicalMedia and Netflix. and Edward Said: Between Worlds an all-archival documentary revolving around scholar Edward Said which had its world premiere at the 2026 Toronto International Film Festival.

Baird has also produced multiple documentaries created by other directors. She frequently collaborates with Alex Gibney including Client 9: The Rise and Fall of Eliot Spitzer (2010), Crazy, Not Insane (2020), and Totally Under Control (2020). and Matthew Heineman with City of Ghosts (2017), and The First Wave (2021).

She has also executive produced No Stone Unturned, which investigates the story of the 1994 Loughinisland massacre in Northern Ireland. She also executive produced Elián, which focuses on Elián Gonzales as a grown adult and the story that followed his removal from the US to Cuba. Icarus, which follows the story of Bryan Fogel as he investigates the world of doping and the ability for athletes to hide their use of pharmacological support. The film received the Academy Award for Best Documentary Feature in 2018. Divide and Conquer: The Story of Roger Ailes by Alexis Bloom, focusing on Roger Ailes, Mystify: Michael Hutchence, Tantura and The Grab.

== Personal life ==
Baird lives in New York City with her husband and three children Brita, Euan, and Maia. She is trilingual, speaking Danish, French, and English.

== Filmography ==
=== Director ===
Year	Title	Notes
2012	Venus and Serena	co-directed with Michelle Major
2022	Ghislaine Maxwell: Filthy Rich	co-directed with Lisa Bryant
2026	Edward Said: Between Worlds	

=== Producer ===
Year	Title	Director
2010	Client 9: The Rise and Fall of Eliot Spitzer	Alex Gibney
2017	Cradle of Champions	Bartle Bull
2022	Tantura	Alan Schwarz

=== Executive Producer ===
Year	Title	Director
2017	City of Ghosts	Matthew Heineman
2017	Icarus	Bryan Fogel
2017	Elián	Tim Golden; Ross McDonnell
2017	No Stone Unturned	Alex Gibney
2018	Divide and Conquer: The Story of Roger Ailes	Alexis Bloom
2019	Mystify: Michael Hutchence	Richard Lowenstein
2019	Maide in Boise	Beth Aala
2020	Crazy, Not Insane	Alex Gibney
2020	Totally Under Control	Alex Gibney
2021	Allen v. Farrow	Amy Ziering; Kirby Dick
2021	The First Wave	Matthew Heineman
2022	The Grab	Gabriela Cowperthwaite
2023	Under the Sky of Damascus	Talal Derki; Heba Khaled; Ali Wajeeh
2023	Another Body	Sophie Compton; Reuben Hamlyn
2024	Antidote	James Jones
2024	Wild Wild Space	Ross Kauffman
2024	The White House Effect	Jon Shenk; Bonni Cohen; Pedro Kos
2024	Between Goodbyes	Jota Mun
2025	Folktales	Heidi Ewing; Rachel Grady
2025	All That's Left of You	Cherien Dabis
2025	Orwell: 2+2=5	Raoul Peck

== See also ==
List of female film and television directors
