= His Name Is Ray =

- Directed by: Michael Del Monte
- Written by: Scott Montgomery; Michael Del Monte
- Produced by: Tad Munnings; Michael Del Monte; Scott Montgomery
- Starring: Raymond Martin
- Cinematography: Michael Del Monte
- Edited by: Michael Del Monte
- Music by: Hanan Townshend
- Distributed by: M Films
- Release date: April 22, 2021 (Hot Docs)
- Running time: 83 minutes
- Country: Canada
- Language: English

His Name Is Ray is a 2021 Canadian documentary film directed by Michael Del Monte. Scott Montgomery and Del Monte wrote the documentary and Hanan Townshend composed the music for the film. His Name Is Ray follows the precarious journey of a homeless man, Raymond Martin, for eight months on the streets of Toronto as he tries to achieve his dream of getting back on the water.

== Production ==
Del Monte drove by the same man panhandling at an intersection close to his house. After months of driving by the intersection of Lakeshore and Jameson, Del Monte decided to talk to the man. Ray invited Del Monte to see what life was like on the streets. Del Monte shot the majority of the film single-handedly, using no tripod and just one lens.

Del Monte approached Scott Montgomery, who was fascinated with the project and came on as a writer. Hanan Townshend was approached early about composing the music for the documentary. Townshend would send music sketches, which Del monte would listen to in one ear while filming.

Outside of a $10,000 grant from Hot Docs Ted Rogers Fund, the documentary was self-funded, partially with the prize money from his prior film Transformer winning the Rogers Audience Award at the Hot Docs Canadian International Documentary Festival in 2018. Derek Cianfrance, who has been a mentor for Del Monte, came on in April 2021 as executive producer.

== Release ==
Hot Docs premiered the documentary on their streaming platform for their members only on April 22, 2021 (Canada only). The film was then planned to be sent to film festivals with representation by CAA.
