= Black Sunflowers =

2026 documentary film

- Directed by: James Marcus Haney
- Produced by: Eric Maldin; Mikayla Jean Miller; Samy Mosher; Reza Pedram; Anna Yatsenko; Volodymyr Yatsenko; Yevhenii Zdorovylo
- Cinematography: Misha Lubarsky
- Edited by: Gary Forrester; Olaf Woldan
- Music by: Dmytro Avksentyev; Brian Eno; Fred Gibson; Brad Oberhofer
- Production companies: Limelite; Snowball's Chance Media
- Release date: September 11, 2026 (TIFF)
- Running time: 94 minutes
- Countries: United States; Ukraine
- Languages: English; Russian; Ukrainian

Black Sunflowers is a 2026 documentary film, directed by James Marcus Haney. A coproduction of companies from the United States and Ukraine, the film profiles a group of young Ukrainians navigating their passage into adulthood in the context of the Russo-Ukrainian War, both their participation in the military defense of their country and their attempts to maintain some normalcy in their lives through typical youth activities such as raves, drag racing and dating.

Haney had originally intended to make a short documentary film about one or two protagonists, but expanded the film's focus after his first trip to Ukraine established that a short film would not be enough to tell the story. Executive producers of the film include Sean Penn, Anna October, and Dianna Agron.

The film premiered in the TIFF Docs program at the 2026 Toronto International Film Festival, where it was first runner-up for the People's Choice Award for Documentaries.
