= Anna October =

Ukrainian fashion designer (born 1990)

- Анна Октябрь
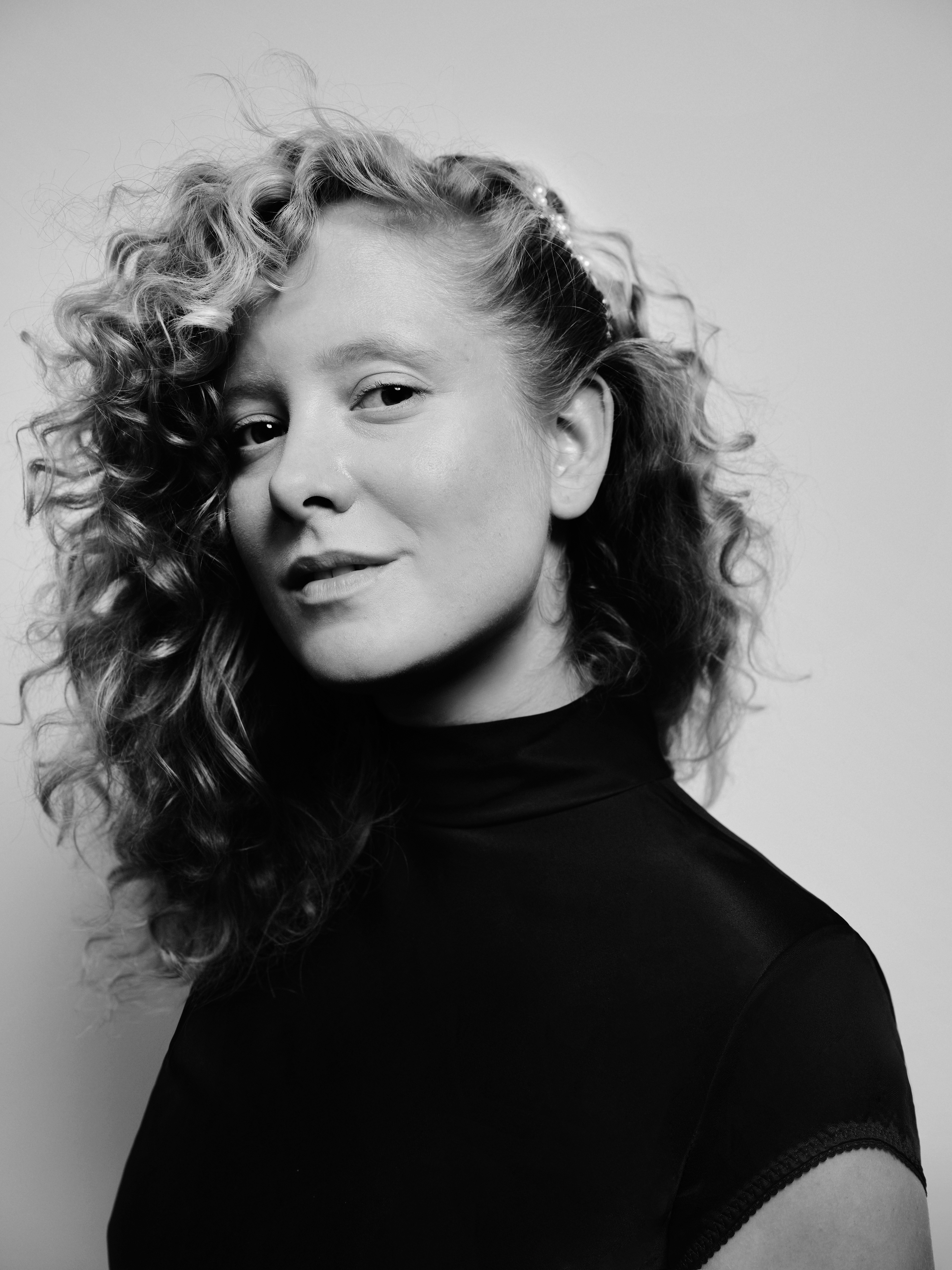
- Anna October in 2020
- Born: 31 December 1990 (age 35); Zaporizhzhia, Ukrainian SSR, Soviet Union
- Occupation: Fashion designer
- Years active: 2010–present
- Known for: Founder and creative director of Anna October
- Awards: LVMH Prize finalist (2014); BoF 500 (2022)
- Website: annaoctober.com

Anna October (Анна Октябрь; born 31 December 1990) is a Ukrainian womenswear designer and the founder of her eponymous fashion brand. Based in Paris since 2022, she is known for lingerie-inspired silhouettes, bias cut construction, and the use of artisanal hand-knitting techniques rooted in Ukrainian textile traditions. October was a finalist for the LVMH Prize in 2014 and was named to the BoF 500 in 2022. Her collections are stocked in over 40 retailers worldwide, including SSENSE, Galeries Lafayette, Moda Operandi, and Farfetch.

== Early life and education ==
Anna October was born in Zaporizhzhia, Ukraine, on 31 December 1990. Her surname derives from her grandfather, who was given the name Октябрь (October) after the October Revolution of 1917. She developed an early interest in fashion and obtained a diploma in pattern cutting and tailoring in Zaporizhzhia before moving to Odesa at the age of 17 to study fine art at the Grekov Odesa Art School, one of the oldest art schools in Ukraine.

== Career ==
=== Early years and founding (2010–2013) ===
In 2010, at the age of 19, October created her first capsule collection, which attracted attention within the Ukrainian fashion community. That same year she formally established the Anna October brand, initially operating out of Kyiv. In 2012, October debuted internationally at London Fashion Week, Paris Fashion Week, and Mercedes-Benz Kiev Fashion Days. That year, she also participated in a project art-directed by David Foley for Atelier 1, a concept store in Kyiv, where she launched the brand and established a dedicated retail space.

=== International recognition (2014–2021) ===
In January 2014, October was selected by Pitti Immagine W as an invited designer within the Guest Nation Ukraine project during the 85th edition of the trade fair in Florence. Later that year, she was shortlisted for the LVMH Prize, a prestigious award for emerging fashion designers.

In 2016, October won the Mercedes-Benz Prize for Best Designer. In 2017, she was selected for Mercedes-Benz's "Generation Now, Generation Next" initiative, a project aimed at highlighting international emerging talent in fashion design. During this period, the brand expanded its retail presence to include Moda Operandi, Galeries Lafayette, SSENSE, FWRD, Shopbop, Harvey Nichols, and Farfetch.

=== Relocation to Paris and Paris Fashion Week debut (2022) ===
In February 2022, following Russia's full-scale invasion of Ukraine, October fled Kyiv. She spent a week on the roads evading conflict zones before reaching Bucharest and ultimately settling in Paris. Upon arrival, she presented her Autumn/Winter 2022 collection during Paris Fashion Week, drawing inspiration from the city that had become her new home.

Together with Julie Pelipas, former fashion director of Vogue Ukraine, October co-founded the fashion designer division of BETTTER + GIVEN NAME Community (community.bettter.us), an online platform created to support Ukrainian creatives displaced by the war. In this role, she helped designers find production facilities, source fabrics, obtain legal support, and connect with wholesale agents.

In the autumn of 2022, October made her official Paris Fashion Week debut with her Spring/Summer 2023 collection, titled "Anna's Pleasure Garden." The presentation was held in Gustave Eiffel's former atelier and featured hand-knitted elements produced by a cooperative of older Ukrainian craftswomen whom the designer has described as the "babushka mafia"—artisans preserving traditional textile techniques while also working with major European fashion houses. The collection drew on folk motifs from the archives of the Ivan Honchar Museum of folk culture in Kyiv.

That year, October was named to the BoF 500, an annual index of the people shaping the global fashion industry.

=== Continued growth and J.Crew collaborations (2023–present) ===
For Spring/Summer 2024, October presented her largest collection to date, comprising around 60 styles, and continued to expand into new categories including knitwear. The lookbook was shot in the botanical gardens of Kyiv despite the ongoing war.

In December 2023, October launched her first collaboration with American retailer J.Crew: an 18-piece holiday capsule collection featuring slip dresses, sequined pieces, feathered tops, and tailored separates, priced between $78 and $398. A second, summer-focused J.Crew × Anna October capsule of 12 pieces followed in June 2024.

== Design philosophy ==
Anna October's design philosophy centres on celebrating femininity and the female body through precise tailoring and lingerie-inspired construction. The brand's signature pieces are dresses—particularly slip dresses—constructed with bias cut techniques that follow the body's contours. October has described her approach as creating garments that function as a "veil enveloping [a woman's] body and following her movements."

The brand maintains its production in Ukraine, employing the same network of hand-knitters for nearly a decade. Collections are produced using deadstock textiles, and a significant proportion of pieces are handcrafted using reimagined artisanal techniques adapted for contemporary garments. Vogue Italia has praised October for transforming femininity into something playful and unexpected.

Recurring design elements include bustier construction, visible stitching details, crochet inserts, and silhouettes that play with the tension between coverage and exposure. The brand's tagline is "Dress for pleasure."

== Celebrity clients ==
Designs by Anna October have been worn by Hailey Bieber, Alexa Chung, and Serena Williams, among others.

== Awards and recognition ==
- 2014 – LVMH Prize, finalist
- 2014 – Pitti Immagine W, Guest Nation Ukraine invited designer
- 2016 – Mercedes-Benz Prize for Best Designer
- 2017 – Mercedes-Benz "Generation Now, Generation Next"
- 2022 – BoF 500
