= Angh (film) =

2026 Indian drama film

- International promotional poster
- Directed by: Theja Rio
- Written by: Theja Rio; James Davis
- Produced by: Nancy Nisa Beso; Theja Rio; Jai Vir Rodgers; Bernardo Angeletti
- Starring: Anghlong Konyak; Douglas Henshall; Sobino Rengma; Genpai Konyak; Amah Konyak; Wangton Konyak
- Cinematography: Adam Pietkiewicz
- Edited by: Tanya Chhabria
- Music by: Sagar Desai
- Production companies: Winter Hymns Films; Undercover Squirrel
- Release date: 15 September 2026 (TIFF)
- Running time: 103 minutes
- Country: India
- Language: Konyak

Angh is a 2026 Indian Konyak-language drama film directed by Theja Rio, in his feature debut, co-written with James Davies and expanded from his 2021 short film of the same title. It centres on a small Konyak Naga family in the 1960s who are the last remaining residents of their otherwise abandoned former village in Nagaland, but whose devotion to the traditional culture of their people is challenged by the arrival of a Christian missionary from the United States.

The film had its world premiere in the Platform section of the 2026 Toronto International Film Festival on 15 September 2026, where it won the Platform Prize.

== Cast ==
- Anghlong Konyak
- Amah Konyak
- Genpai Konyak
- Sobino Rengma
- Wangton Konyak
- Douglas Henshall

== Plot ==
Set in Nagaland during the early 1960s, the film centres on Anghba, an ageing Konyak village chief, and his young son. Despite the growing adoption of Christianity in the region, both continue to practise their traditional faith. When a missionary (Douglas Henshall) from the United States arrives, their responses diverge; the father rejects the religious change, while the son takes an interest in the missionary's beliefs.

== Production ==
The film finds its origins in a short film that Theja Rio wrote and directed in 2019. Thereafter, encouraged by its reception at festivals in 2021, he developed a feature-length adaptation. Subsequently, several collaborators, including writing, production and cinematory teams were recruited from Rio's alma mater National Film and Television School, UK. Members of the Konyak community helped build the village sets and served as cultural advisers on costume design. Before the commencement of filming Casting director Bendang Walling conducted a two-week workshop, followed by rehearsals and dialogue practice with Rio.

Douglas Henshall's casting as the missionary was announced in April 2025, with the remainder of the cast comprising local amateur actors from Nagaland, including Anghlong Konyak, Amah Konyak, Genpai Konyak, Sobino Rengma and Wangton Konyak. Rio and his team searched through villages in the Mon region of Nagaland for performers. The actors portraying the father and son, Anghlong Konyak and Sobino Rengma, are unrelated.

Cinematographer Adam Pietkiewicz, known for Baby Reindeer 2024, shot the film on 16 mm film to evoke the texture of archival photographs and footage of Naga communities from the 1950s and 1960s.For production, two village sets were built in Nagaland . Principal photography took place in the village of Thekrejüma for almost a month, followed by seven days in Phesama, also in Kohima district.

Director Theja Rio after winning the Platform Prize for Angh at TIFF, 2026

== Release ==
The film had its public premiere in the Platform Prize program at the 2026 Toronto International Film Festival.

== Accolades ==
It was named the winner of the Platform Prize competition on September 20, automatically qualifying it for the submission process for the Academy Award for Best International Feature Film. Cinematographer Adam Pietkiewicz was also named as the recipient of the Artisan Award at the TIFF Tribute Awards for his work on the film.
