= Thirteen in Gaza =

2026 Palestinian drama film

- Arabic: غزة 13
- Directed by: Hosam Abu Dan
- Written by: Khalil al Muzzayyan
- Produced by: Hosam Abu Dan
- Starring: Mary Ziyara; Firas Al-Masri; Ghassan Salem
- Cinematography: Yousef Al Mashharawi
- Edited by: Hosam Abu Dan
- Music by: Alaa El Rawey
- Production company: New Scene for Media Production
- Distributed by: Watermelon Pictures
- Release date: September 15, 2026 (TIFF)
- Running time: 77 minutes
- Country: Palestine
- Language: Arabic

Thirteen in Gaza (Arabic: غزة 13) is a Palestinian drama film, directed by Hosam Abu Dan and released in 2026. The film centres on Raghad (Mary Ziyara), a 13-year-old girl coming of age in a displacement camp in the Gaza Strip after losing most of her family in a bombing raid, while her father Abu (Firas Al-Masri) is drawn into a dangerous black market economic scheme run by Khalil (Ghassan Salem) in an attempt to provide for himself and his daughter.

== Production ==
The first feature-length film production to be shot in Gaza since the beginning of the Gaza war, the film was shot in just 12 days by a skeleton crew of just five people, reduced to four when one of the crew members was injured when the film was itself disrupted by an airstrike. It was filmed digitally onto two memory cards.

== Distribution ==
The film premiered in the Centrepiece program at the 2026 Toronto International Film Festival, where it was the winner of the NETPAC Prize.

It was one of several films, from both sides of the Israeli-Palestinian conflict, that faced concerns during the 2026 film festival season around their ability to secure commercial distribution deals due to major film companies shying away from the potential for controversy. Other films implicated in the same discussion included NAZA, Our Loves and Edward Said: Between Worlds.

The film was ultimately acquired for distribution by the independent company Watermelon Pictures.
