= 2026 Toronto International Film Festival =

51st edition of Canadian film festival

- Opening film: Being Heumann by Sian Heder
- Closing film: Villeneuve: The Rise of a Legend by Yan Lanouette Turgeon
- Location: Toronto, Ontario, Canada
- Founded: 1976
- Awards: La bola negra (People's Choice Award)
- Festival date: September 10–20, 2026
- Website: tiff.net

Toronto International Film Festival
- 2027 2025

The 51st annual Toronto International Film Festival was held from September 10 to September 20, 2026.

The festival's opening film was Being Heumann by Sian Heder, and its closing film was Villeneuve: The Rise of a Legend (Villeneuve : l'ascension d'une légende) by Yan Lanouette Turgeon.

The festival also hosted the 2026 edition of the Student Academy Awards, and non-English language winners of the festival's Platform Prize are now automatically eligible for the Academy Award for Best International Feature Film.

The festival's first programming announcement of three Gala titles was revealed on July 7, 2026, and a second announcement of five Special Presentations films was released on July 16. Several full sections were announced in the week of July 20, with additional announcements in the week of August 3, before the complete schedule was announced August 11.

== Market ==
The festival included the formal launch of a film market, separately from the public event, building on the introduction of the Industry Selects program at the 2020 Toronto International Film Festival. The market took place at the Metro Toronto Convention Centre, while the main public festival remained at the Princess of Wales Theatre, Roy Thomson Hall, the Royal Alexandra Theatre, the TIFF Lightbox and Scotiabank Theatre Toronto, with the Convention Centre's John Bassett Theatre added as a festival screening venue.

In February 2025, the festival announced the first members of the inaugural advisory committee for the market project, including former Cannes Film Market head Jerome Paillard, film producers Niv Fichman, Vincent Maraval and Noah Segal, former SODEC president Monique Simard, Creative Artists Agency financier Roeg Sutherland, and Kerry Swanson of Canada's Indigenous Screen Office. Additional advisory committee members were announced in May, including Moses Babatope, Michael Barker, Arianna Bocco, Janet Brown, Diana Bustamante Escobar, Vicki Dobbs, Jeongin Hong and Laura Michalchyshyn.

Charles Tremblay, formerly of film distributors Métropole Films and MK2, was the leader of the film market.

The market included a dedicated program for genre films, produced in collaboration with the Fantasia International Film Festival's Frontières market. It also included the presentation of the established TIFF-CBC Films Screenwriter Award for as yet unproduced screenplays by emerging Canadian filmmakers.

== Awards ==
=== Tribute Awards ===
The first recipients of the TIFF Tribute Awards were announced on July 29, 2026. They include Rosalind Eleazar and Isabelle Huppert as the winners of the Performer Award, Lee Chang-dong as the winner of the Director Award, Sian Heder as the winner of the Jeff Skoll Award in Impact Media, and Penélope Cruz as recipient of the Special Tribute Award.

A second round of Tribute Award recipients was announced in August, including Seth Rogen for the Norman Jewison Award, cinematographer Adam Pietkiewicz as recipient of the Artisan Award, filmmaker Bassam Tariq as the winner of the Rising Talent Award, Helen Mirren as recipient of the Share Her Journey Groundbreaker award, and Fan Bingbing as a second Special Tribute Award recipient.

=== Regular awards ===
The festival's juried and audience-voted awards were announced on September 20 at the festival's conclusion.

Award	Film	Director
People's Choice Award	La bola negra	Javier Calvo, Javier Ambrossi
People's Choice Award, First Runner Up	I Play Rocky	Peter Farrelly
People's Choice Award, Second Runner Up	Being Heumann	Sian Heder
International People's Choice Award	Elsinore	Simon Stone
International People's Choice Award, First Runner Up	Possible Love (가능한 사랑)	Lee Chang-dong
International People's Choice Award, Second Runner Up	The Assassin(s) (암살자(들))	Hur Jin-ho
People's Choice Award: Documentaries	Darlene Love: I Know Where I've Been	Barry Avrich
Documentary, First Runner Up	Black Sunflowers	James Marcus Haney
Documentary, Second Runner Up	The Ultra Runner	Mila Aung-Thwin
People's Choice Award: Midnight Madness	Ladies and Gentlemen, Brian Mulroney (Mesdames et Messieurs, Brian Mulroney)	Matthew Rankin
Midnight Madness, First Runner Up	The Spiral (L'estranea)	Paolo Strippoli
Midnight Madness, Second Runner Up	Arrested Memory (狂忘警探)	Sabu
Platform Prize	Angh	Theja Rio
Platform Prize, Honorable Mention	Brace Your Heart (Garrat du Váimmu)	Amanda Kernell
Best Canadian Feature Film	Sunburn	Serville Poblete
Best Canadian Feature Film, Honorable Mention	Man in Motion: The Rick Hansen Story	Adrian Buitenhuis
Best Canadian Discovery	Smudge the Blades	Cody Lightning
Best Canadian Discovery, Honorable Mention	The Black Box Is Orange	Yuula Benivolski
Best Animated Short Film	Into the Betaverse	Varun Raman, Tom Hancock
Best Animated Short Film, Honorable Mention	Terminal	Alexandre Siqueira
Best Canadian Short Film	Fight Kid	Michael Del Monte
Best Canadian Short Film, Honorable Mention	Almost Pink (Presque rose)	Justine Prince
Best International Short Film	MAMMALIA	Elia Kalogianni
Best International Short Film, Honorable Mention	The Spectacular Death of Prisca	Kaelo Iyizoba
FIPRESCI Award	Ancestors	David Turpin
NETPAC Award	Thirteen in Gaza (غزة 13)	Hosam Abu Dan

=== Juries ===
- Canadian Feature Film: Hubert Davis, Deepa Mehta, Christina Rogers
- Canadian Discovery: Zarrar Kahn, Justine Pimlott, Sophy Romvari
- FIPRESCI: Pragya Mishra, Cătălin Olaru, Savina Petkova, Enoe Lopes Pontes, Victor Stiff
- NETPAC: Mara Matta, Richard Fung, Panagiotis Kotzathanasis
- Platform: Pablo Trapero, Amma Asante, Sylvia Chang, Luc Déry, Albert Lee
- Short Cuts: Joecar Hanna, Chris Lavis, Iris Ng

== Program ==
=== Gala Presentations ===
Galas and special presentations were announced on July 20.

English title	Original title	Director(s)	Production country
All About Corinne	Ni vue, ni connue	Marc Fitoussi	France
Always Lalisa		Sue Kim	United States
The Assassin(s)	암살자(들)	Hur Jin-ho	South Korea
Atonement		Reed Van Dyk	United States
Babies		Lauren Miller Rogen	United States
Being Heumann		Sian Heder	United States
Bunker		Florian Zeller	France, Spain
Diary of a Mad Old Man		Wayne Wang	United States
Evil Genius		Courteney Cox	United States
Girl Group		Rebel Wilson	United Kingdom
It's My Time	魔方小姐	Bai Xue	China, Hong Kong
The Life and Deaths of Wilson Shedd		Tim Blake Nelson	United States
Man in Motion: The Rick Hansen Story		Adrian Buitenhuis	Canada
Misty Green		Chris Rock	United States
The Only Living Pickpocket in New York		Noah Segan	United States
Onwards and Sideways		John Madden	United Kingdom
Prima Facie		Susanna White	United Kingdom, Australia
Pretenders		Joss Crowley	United Kingdom
Run Terry Run		Sean Menard	Canada
Spirit Guardians: The Last Secret of the First Emperor	Hộ Linh Tráng Sĩ: Bí ẩn mộ vua Đinh	Nguyễn Phan Quang Bình	Vietnam
A Talent for Murder		Anton Corbijn	United Kingdom, Italy
Tenzing		Jennifer Peedom	United States, Australia
Up Against It		Trudie Styler	United Kingdom
Villeneuve: The Rise of a Legend	Villeneuve: l'ascension d'une légende	Yan Lanouette Turgeon	Canada

=== Special Presentations ===
Galas and special presentations were announced on July 20.

English title	Original title	Director(s)	Production country
The Age of Goodbyes	告別的年代	Edmund Yeo	Taiwan, Malaysia
All of a Sudden	急に具合が悪くなる / Soudain	Ryûsuke Hamaguchi	France, Japan, Germany, Belgium
All That She Wants		Scarlett Bermingham, Andrew Rhymer	United States, Canada
Alpha Gang		David Zellner, Nathan Zellner	United States
Bad Lieutenant: Tokyo		Takashi Miike	United States, United Kingdom, Japan
The Beloved	El ser querido	Rodrigo Sorogoyen	Spain, France
Bitter Christmas	Amarga Navidad	Pedro Almodóvar	Spain
La bola negra		Javier Calvo, Javier Ambrossi	Spain, France
Bucking Fastard		Werner Herzog	United States
Clarissa		Arie Esiri, Chuko Esiri	Nigeria, United States
Closing Night		Cody Fern	Australia, Canada
Club Kid		Jordan Firstman	United States
Coward		Lukas Dhont	Belgium
The Debut		Jesse Eisenberg	United States
Elsinore		Simon Stone	United Kingdom
Everest: The Other Side		Jimmy Chin, Elizabeth Chai Vasarhelyi	United States
Everybody Wants to Fuck Me		Jonathan Schey	United Kingdom, France, United States
Faith		Paul Andrew Williams	United Kingdom
Le Faux Soir		Michaël R. Roskam	Belgium, France
Fjord		Cristian Mungiu	Romania, France, Norway, Sweden, Denmark
Gentle Monster		Marie Kreutzer	Austria
Glaxo		Benjamín Naishtat	Argentina, Brazil
A Good Little Soldier	Un bon petit soldat	Stéphane Brizé	France
Growth of the Soil	Markens grøde	Hans Petter Moland	Norway
Happily Ever After	幸福快樂的日子	Feng-I Fiona Roan	Taiwan
Hombre al agua		Gael García Bernal	Mexico
The Housewife		Ben Shirinian	United States
I Play Rocky		Peter Farrelly	United States
The Idiot(s)		Małgorzata Szumowska, Michał Englert	Poland, Germany
In Alaska		Jaap van Heusden, Vinnie Karetak	Netherlands, Canada
Ink		Danny Boyle	United Kingdom, France, United States
It Will Happen Tonight	Succederà questa notte	Nanni Moretti	Italy, France, Spain
Josephine		Beth de Araújo	United States
The Julia Set		Niki Byrne	United States
The Liberation		Guy Nattiv	United Kingdom, United States, New Zealand
A Long Winter		Andrew Haigh	United States, Canada, United Kingdom
Look Back	ルックバック	Hirokazu Kore-eda	Japan
Love of Your Life		Rachel Morrison	United States
The Man I Love		Ira Sachs	United States
Minotaur	Минотавр	Andrey Zvyagintsev	France, Germany, Latvia
Mr. Nelson, Did You Kill People?	ネルソンさん、あなたは人を殺しましたか?	Shinya Tsukamoto	Japan
Neil Peart: No One's Disciple		Sam Dunn, Scot McFadyen	Canada
Paradise Lost	실낙원	Yeon Sang-ho	South Korea
Phoolan		Richie Mehta	India
Possible Love	가능한 사랑	Lee Chang-dong	South Korea
The Road Not Taken	明天，会更好	Peter Ho-Sun Chan	China, Hong Kong
The Stunt Driver		Michael Dowse	Canada
Tender Loving Care		Mike Leigh	United Kingdom
The Unknown	L'Inconnue	Arthur Harari	France
Whatcha Want		Mina Shum	Canada
Wild Horse Nine		Martin McDonagh	United Kingdom, United States, Chile
Your Mother Your Mother Your Mother		Bassam Tariq	United States

=== Special Events ===
English title	Original title	Director(s)	Production country
Hope	호프	Na Hong-jin	South Korea
The Last Photograph		Zack Snyder	United States, Colombia
Obsession		Curry Barker	United States
Redefined: Short Film Showcase "Butter Chicken to Go", "RE/ROUTE", "pahkwêsikan sâkihitowin: Bannock is Love", "Where Our Flowers Grow (Là où nos fleurs poussent)", "Restaurant Kids"		Prajj, Gabrielle Côté, Tyra Delver, Maxime Kornachuk, Sylvia Mok	Canada

"In Conversation" events were held with actors Andrew Scott and Hudson Williams, filmmakers Rachel Morrison and Lee Min-ho, and comedian and filmmaker Chris Rock.

=== Centrepiece ===
The Centrepiece program was announced on August 4.

English title	Original title	Director(s)	Production country
After Elena	Después de Elena	Shawn Garry	Chile, Colombia, Italy
Ah Girl	泡泡糖女孩	Ang Geck Geck Priscilla	Singapore
Ashes	Ceniza en la boca	Diego Luna	Mexico, Spain
L'Autre		Alexandre Franchi	Canada
Back in Black		Ron Murphy	Canada
Ben'Imana		Marie-Clementine Dusabejambo	Rwanda, Gabon, France, Norway
The Betrayers		David Bezmozgis	Canada, Ukraine
The Bovine with the Curved Horns	El bovino de los cuernos curvos	Omar E. Ospina Giraldo	Colombia
The City of the Living	La città dei vivi	Edoardo Gabbriellini	Italy
Congo Boy		Rafiki Fariala	Central African Republic, France, Democratic Republic of Congo, Italy
Conversation with the Sea	حوار مع البحر	Muayad Alayan	Palestine
The Difficult Bride		Rubaiyat Hossain	France, Bangladesh, Germany, Norway, Portugal
Dorothy	டோரதி	Karthik Subbaraj	India
The Dreamed Adventure	Das Geträumte Abenteuer	Valeska Grisebach	Germany, France, Bulgaria, Austria
Eklipse		Manuel Wetscher	Austria, Italy
Elephants in the Fog	तिनीहरू	Abinash Bikram Shah	Nepal, France, Germany, Brazil, Norway
Everytime		Sandra Wollner	Austria, Germany
Flies	Moscas	Fernando Eimbcke	Mexico
Four Seasons in Java	Empat Musim Pertiwi	Kamila Andini	Indonesia, France, Netherlands, Norway, Poland, Saudi Arabia, Singapore
Furies		Rami Kodeih	Lebanon, Brazil
Future Tense		Jenna Cato Bass	South Africa, Australia
A Girl Unknown	无名女孩	Zou Jing	China
God Bless You, Mr Kopu		Alex Liu	New Zealand, Australia
La Gradiva		Marine Atlan	France, Italy
Ha-Chan, Shake Your Booty!		Josef Kubota Wladyka	United States
How We Stand		Marie Clements	Canada
Inherit	คุณยายวรนาฏ	Banjong Pisanthanakun	Thailand
Intermission	中场休息	Yonfan	Hong Kong
Iron Boy	Le Corset	Louis Clichy	France, Belgium
Julián		Louise Bagnall	Luxembourg, Ireland, Canada, Denmark
Lemonade		Kim Bartley	Ireland, United Kingdom
Light Pillar	寒夜灯柱	Xu Zao	China
Long Long Night	긴긴밤	Kyu Bock Youm	South Korea
The Lost Children of Tuam		Frank Berry	Ireland
Love Is the Monster	Amor es el monstruo	Neto Villalobos Brenes	Costa Rica, Peru, Panama, Chile, Mexico
Mary Magdalene	Marie Madeleine	Gessica Généus	France, Haiti, Belgium, Canada, Luxembourg
Muyi	Muyi, la légende du village des femmes	Julien Chheng	France
Neverman		Rodrigo Barriuso	Canada
Our Loves	האהבות שלנו	Avi Nesher	Israel
Rehearsals for a Revolution	خاطرات ایران	Pegah Ahangarani	Czech Republic, Spain
The Secret Lives of Baba Segi's Wives		Daniel Oriahi	Nigeria
Smudge the Blades		Cody Lightning	Canada
Soumsoum, The Night of the Stars	Soumsoum, la nuit des astres	Mahamat-Saleh Haroun	Chad, France
Sunburn		Serville Poblete	Canada
Tangles		Leah Nelson	Canada, United States
The Surgeon		Roshan Sethi	Ireland
Thirteen in Gaza	غزة 13	Hosam Abu Dan	Palestine
Toy Gun Bandit	Faux gun bandit	Rémi St-Michel	Canada
Trash Mountain		Kris Rey	United States
Trees Are Watching		Bahman Ghobadi	Turkey
The Violinist	La Violinista	Ervin Han, Raúl García	Singapore, Spain, Italy
Viva Carmen	Carmen, l'Oiseau Rebel	Sébastien Laudenbach	France
We Are All Strangers	我们不是陌生人	Anthony Chen	Singapore
Where the River Begins	Donde comenzia el rio	Juan Andrés Arango	Canada, Colombia, Norway
Woman Unknown	Kvinde ukendt	May el-Toukhy	Denmark

=== TIFF Docs ===
Documentaries were announced on August 5.

English title	Original title	Director(s)	Production country
Ba's Book		Ashley Duong	Canada
Black Sunflowers		James Marcus Haney	Ukraine, United States
Bleeding Hearts		Andrew Morgan	United States
Cheyenne		Taimi Arvidson	United States
Darlene Love: I Know Where I've Been		Barry Avrich	Canada
Edward Said: Between Worlds		Maiken Baird	United States
The Final Act	Le Dernier acte	Sophie Deraspe	Canada
Gail		Michael Maxxis	Canada
The Hummingbird Paints Fragrant Songs		Èlia Gasull Balada, Matteo Norzi	Peru, United States, Qatar
Like Magic		Melissa Saavedra Gil	Colombia, Argentina, Uruguay
Low Lies the Land		Emanuele Gerosa	Denmark, Italy
Musk		Alex Gibney	United States
The Pervert's Guide to Utopias		Sophie Fiennes	Ireland, United Kingdom, Slovenia, Netherlands, Norway
Rapinoe		Rebeca Huntt	United Kingdom, United States
Re/Pair		Lacey Schwartz Delgado	United States
Rescue		Sine Plambech	Denmark, Italy, Germany, Sweden, Iceland
Still Night, Burning House		Carol Nguyen	Canada
Tehran, Under the Skin		Afsaneh Salari	France, Iran, Sweden
Turtle Island Rap		Alexandra Lazarowich	Canada
The Ultra Runner		Mila Aung-Thwin	Canada
Union Town		Barbara Kopple	United States

=== Discovery ===
The Discovery program was announced on July 22.

English title	Original title	Director(s)	Production country
Ancestors		David Turpin	Ireland, United Kingdom
Arne Goes to Space		Lars Vega	Sweden
A Common Story	Una storia	Anna Foglietta	Italy
Bedford Park		Stephanie Ahn	United States
The Daughters of Abraham	Les Filles d'Abraham	Hanaël El Yousfi	France
Drifter		Sung Kang	United States
The Fortunate Isles	Las islas afortunadas	Helena Girón, Samuel Delgado	Spain, Greece
Head to Head	Sar beh Sar	Ghasideh Golmakani	Iran, Germany
I Am Mario	Soy Mario	Sharon Kleinberg	Mexico
In Waves		Phuong Mai Nguyen	France, Belgium
Krux		Tony Vahl	Germany, Poland
Magazine		Alexandra Pechman	United States
Memories of a Forest	Erinnerungen eines Waldes	Katharina Rabl	Germany, Austria
Nosotros		Joaquín Ruano	Guatemala, Mexico
Purgatory		Lindsay Lanzillotta	Canada, United States
Salvation		Tom Nicoll	United Kingdom
Seventeen		Justin Ducharme	Canada
Sisters	Hermanas	Ione Hernández	Spain
Strong Son		Ian Bawa	Canada
Stuffed		Theo Rhys	United Kingdom
Voices		Deantè Gray	United States
We Are Born Good	善男信女	Leung Chuen Yeung	Hong Kong
What Lies Between Us	Dobbeltfejl	Amalie Næsby Fick	Denmark
Zjili: A Story of Sisterhood and the Burdens of Excess		Christine Boateng, Hajara Musah Chambas	Ghana

=== Platform ===
The Platform Prize program was announced on July 21. The jury consisted of Pablo Trapero, Amma Asante, Sylvia Chang, Luc Déry and Albert Lee. As noted above, the Platform Prize competition is one of six international film festival awards which now qualify non-English winners for the Academy Award for Best International Feature Film independently of the national submission process.

English title	Original title	Director(s)	Production country
Angh		Theja Rio	India
Brace Your Heart	Garrat du Váimmu	Amanda Kernell	Sweden, Norway, Denmark, Iceland, Bulgaria
Children Untold	わたしの知らない子どもたち	Miwa Nishikawa	Japan
Djinn Wedding	Cinlerin Düğünü	Ferit Karahan	Turkey
Idda		Irene Dionisio	Italy
In the Heart of the South		Nyla Innuksuk	Canada
Masc		Bertil Nilsson	United Kingdom
On Behalf of My Son	Vicentina Pede Desculpas	Gabriel Martins	Brazil
Silenced Nights		Lawrence Fajardo	Philippines
The Smell of Apples		John Trengove	South Africa, Netherlands, Chile
Wild, Wild East	Dziki Dziki Wschód	Jan Holoubek	Poland
The World Before	첫세계	Yoon Dan-bi	South Korea

=== Midnight Madness ===
The Midnight Madness program was announced on August 6.

English title	Original title	Director(s)	Production country
Anchors Aweigh		Matt Barats	United States
Arrested Memory	狂忘警探	Sabu	Taiwan, Japan
The Face of Horror		Anna Biller	United Kingdom
HALF		Samjad	India
Kick On		Nick Kozakis	Australia
Ladies and Gentlemen, Brian Mulroney	Mesdames et Messieurs, Brian Mulroney	Matthew Rankin	Canada
River		Joshua Giuliano	United States
Rogue Trooper		Duncan Jones	United Kingdom
The Spiral	L'estranea	Paolo Strippoli	Italy, France, Belgium
Vintage Violence		Eugene Kotlyarenko	United States, Japan

=== Primetime ===
The Primetime program was announced on July 23.

English title	Original title	Director(s)	Production country
2.6 Seconds: Death in the Outback		Darren Dale	Australia
Alice		Virginie Verrier, Guillaume Lonergan	France, Canada
American Hostage		Shawn Ryan, Eileen Myers, Adam Arkin	United States
Below		Jesse McKeown	Canada
Blindspot Berlin		David Nawrath	Germany
Carrie		Mike Flanagan	Canada, United States
Crystal Lake		Brad Caleb Kane, Michael Lennox	United States
Oxygen Masks Will (Not) Drop Automatically		Marcelo Gomes, Carol Minêm	Brazil
Slow Horses		Will Smith, Adam Randall	United Kingdom, United States
YAGA		Kat Sandler, Rachel Talalay, David Frazee	Canada

=== Short Cuts ===
The Short Cuts program was announced on August 5.

English title	Original title	Director(s)	Production country
2:Love		Ronni Shalev	Belgium, France, Israel
Almost Pink	Presque rose	Justine Prince	Canada
Aman		Rahul Roye	India, United Kingdom, United States, France
El Aumento		Maria Belen Poncio	Argentina, United States
Beans and Belief		Tenzin Sedon	United States, Canada, China
Between Late April and Early May		Sophia Smith	Canada
BID16		Mick Robertson, Margaret Rose	Canada
Bloodline		Fala Chen	United States
Buddies		Fraser Wolfe	Canada
Call Me Tim		Shamier Anderson	Canada
The Comet		Julie Charette	Canada
The Day I Smoked a Cigarette with my Father		Sameh Alaa, Robin Vouters	France, Egypt, Belgium
Dough Man		Brittney Gavin, Amy Mielke	Canada
The Dream Is a Snail		Thien An Nguyen	Vietnam, South Korea
Driftwood		A.C. Birch	Canada
The End		Niki Lindroth von Bahr	Sweden, France, Denmark
The Episode		Logan Graham Greene	Canada
Fight Kid		Michael Del Monte	Canada
Fivehead		Christian Smith	Canada
Forgotten Spaceman		Elham Ehsas	Afghanistan, United Kingdom
Fried Chicken & Strip Checkers		Ophelia Harutyunyan	Armenia, France
The Highway		Yung Chang	Canada, China
Imichki		Yza Nouiga	Canada
Into the Betaverse		Varun Raman, Tom Hancock	United Kingdom
Koden'n		Daniel «Tètèl» Chérubin	Canada
Leftover Women		Atalanta Swire	United Kingdom
The Lion Does Not Concern Himself		Zarrar Kahn	Canada
Madrugada		Sebastián Lojo	Guatemala
MAMMALIA		Elia Kalogianni	Greece, Netherlands
Melk		Filip Anthonissen	Belgium
Moongirl		Victor Boccard	Japan
Pacific Spirit		Antoine Bourges	Canada
Patronymic		Mariia Ponomarova	Netherlands, Ukraine
Please		Anna Mantzaris	Sweden, France, Czech Republic, Norway, Finland
Skinny Boots	Skinny Bottines	Romain F. Dubois	Canada
Soul Catcher	Haboolm Ksinaalgat	Amanda Strong, Pamela Post	Canada
The Spectacular Death of Prisca		Kaelo Iyizoba	Nigeria
A Tenderness		Sabrine Khoury	Netherlands, Palestine
Terminal		Alexandre Siqueira	Portugal, Spain, France
Termite		Shaunak Sen	India
Till the Milk Runs Dry		Kalainithan Kalaichelvan	Canada
Under the Same Clouds		Jérémi Roy	Canada
Untitled Woman		Camille Summers-Valli	United Kingdom, United States
When the Ground Paused		Jess Barclay Lawton	Australia
Yek Rooz-e Shirin		Omid Abdollahi	Iran

=== Wavelengths ===
The Wavelengths program was announced on August 4.

English title	Original title	Director(s)	Production country
Feature films
At Night		Beatrice Gibson	United Kingdom, France
The Black Box Is Orange		Yuula Benivolski	Canada
The Diary of a Chambermaid	Le journal d'une femme de chambre	Radu Jude	France, Romania
Double Freedom	La libertad doble	Lisandro Alonso	Chile, Argentina, Luxembourg, Germany, United Kingdom
Everything Else Is Noise	Lo demás es ruido	Nicolás Pereda	Germany, Canada, Mexico
Life of Jorge Luis Borges	Biografía de Jorge Luis Borges	Mariano Llinás	Argentina
London		Sebastian Brameshuber	Austria
My Wife Cries	Meine Frau Weint	Angela Schanelec	Germany, France
Nobody's Violence	Violence du corps à l'autre	Denis Côté	Canada
Once Upon a Time in Harlem		William Greaves, David Greaves	United States
The Remotes		John Torres	Philippines
Short films
The Address Book		Mustafa Uzuner	Canada
After Image		Rita Ferrando	Canada, Argentina
Chronicle of Tiredness	Crónica del cansancio	Natalia Marín	Spain
Electric Fragments No. 1 - Rom (Men)	Frammenti Elettrici No. 1 - Rom (Uomini)	Yervant Gianikian, Angela Ricci Lucchi	Italy
Fevers		James Richards	Germany, United Kingdom
Fire Flies	咒语	Zheng Lu Xinyuan	China
Forever...Forever		Johann Lurf	Austria, France
Ghazal-e Sorkh	غزالِ سرخ	Maryam Tafakory	Iran, United Kingdom, France
Masao Adachi Takes a Passport Photo	足立正生、パスポート写真を撮る	Kamal Aljafari	Germany, France, Japan
Microcosmic Orbit: Encased		Danaya Chulphuthiphong	Thailand
Moon Palace	月宫	Jiaqi Yu	China, United States
Peacocks Come with the Clouds	طاووس‌ها با ابرها می‌آیند	Parastoo Anoushahpour	Iran, Canada
La Prospettiva (1653)		Ben Russell	France, Italy
Splits in Two		Simon Liu	Hong Kong, United States
This Suffocating Now		Vika Kirchenbauer	Germany
TM		Takehisa Kosugi	Japan
Two Pids		John Smith	United Kingdom

=== TIFF Classics ===
The Classics program was announced on August 4.

English title	Original title	Director(s)	Production country
The Devils (1971)		Ken Russell	United Kingdom
Kissed (1996)		Lynne Stopkewich	Canada
Pelechian Project: Land of the People, The Beginning, We, The Seasons, The End		Artavazd Peleshyan	Soviet Union, Armenia
Report to Mother (1986)	Amma Ariyan	John Abraham	India
Spring in a Small Town (1948)	小城之春	Fei Mu	China
Ten Dark Women (1961)	黒い十人の女	Kon Ichikawa	Japan

=== Festival Street ===
English title	Original title	Director(s)	Production country
City Lights		Charlie Chaplin	United States
The F Word		Michael Dowse	Canada
Freaky Friday		Gary Nelson	United States
The Great Muppet Caper		Jim Henson	United States
Hoosiers		David Anspaugh	United States
Madagascar		Eric Darnell, Tom McGrath	United States
Now You See Me		Louis Leterrier	United States
Spy Kids		Robert Rodriguez	United States
Strangers on a Train		Alfred Hitchcock	United States
Willy Wonka & the Chocolate Factory		Mel Stuart	United States

== Market screenings ==
Films screened at TIFF's Market, but not officially included in the public program.

English title	Original title	Director(s)	Production country
100 Days	100 Dias	Carlos Saldanha	Brazil
111 Echoes from Halifax		Mauro Mueller	Canada, Switzerland
5 More Minutes	5 minutos más	Javier Ruiz Caldera	Spain
African Works in Progress; Last Weekend in October, I’m Coming for You (Pour toi je reviendrai), Dear Ajayi, Not God's Plan, The Motorcycle Smuggler, The Black Book 2: Old Scores		Nosarieme Garrick, Cyrielle Raingou, Damilola Orimogunje, Reabetswe Moeti-Vogt, Arice Siapi, Editi Effiong	United States, Nigeria, Cameroon, France, Germany, South Africa, Belgium, Greece
All Wishes Come True!	Bāxiān!	Mu Zhengyang	China
Alphas		Liam O'Donnell	South Africa, United Kingdom
Apparition		Cuauhtemoc Velazquez Lopez	Mexico, Canada, Japan
Baby Bangkok		Hu Xinyun	China
Back to Buenos Aires	Ritorno a Buenos Aires	Marco Bechis	Italy, Brazil
Before It's Too Late / If You Run Out of Ramyun	라면이 불기 전에 / 라면이 떨어지면	Se-yeon Oh, Tae-yeoup Kim	South Korea
Beliphool		Aniba Rahman	Bangladesh, United States
Big World	Xiǎo xiǎo de wǒ	Yang Lina	China
Bollywoof		Frederik Du Chau	United Kingdom, India
Bruton		Vincent Grashaw	United States
Burgundy		Michael Dweck, Gregory Kershaw	France
Call Me Queen		Emily Atef	Germany, France, United Kingdom
Cassowary		Zhang Hanyi	China
Chand Tara		Mohammad Ali Baig	India
Chernobyl-2: Life After	Chornobyl-2: Zhyttia Pislia	Olga Antimony	Canada, Ukraine
The Colour of the Sun		Xavier Tera	Canada, Italy
Compound		James Mulcahy	United States
The Confession of Mary		Ananth Narayan Mahadevan	India
Daniel		Daniel Kooman	Canada, United States
DAU		Ilya Khrzhanovsky	Germany, France, Sweden, Russia
Dead to Rights		Shen Ao	China
Dear You		Lan Hongchun	China
Diane in the Loop	Un détour par Diane	Ann Sirot, Raphaël Balboni	Belgium, France
Don't Fence Me In: Queer Country		Colette Johnson-Vosberg	Canada
The Elder Hunters		David Rodriguez	United Kingdom, United States
Eleven Days		Peter Landesman	United States
Every Living Thing		Uzair Merchant	India, Canada, United Arab Emirates
FAT		Dolores Rice	Ireland
The First Dinosaur		J. J. Johnson	Canada
Forty Love		Pierre-Ange Carlotti	France
Foster		Timothy Woodward Jr.	United States
Freeing Flipper		Barney Douglas	United Kingdom, United States
Frontières at TIFF; Felt, Fin, Nature Boy, Ringing the Changes, The Pageant, Two-Gun Cohen, Wolf of the North		Ran Jing, Lowell Dean, Matias Mariani, Felix Dembinski, Deanna Milligan, Ramsey Fendall, Johnnie To, Jerome Sable	Canada, Brazil, United Kingdom, United States
GANJ The Treasures Of Shah Jo Risalo		Shamim Junejo	Canada, India, Pakistan
The Girl with the Leica	La ragazza con la Leica	Alina Marazzi	Italy
The Golden Age		Bérenger Thouin	France
Gugu's World	Feito Pipa	Allan Deberton	Brazil
Ground Floor	Földszint	Gábor Reisz	Hungary, Italy
The Helpers		Peter Wayne	Canada, United States
Holy Wood Dust		Viktor Kossakovsky	Italy, Germany, Spain
How Can I Help	Frau Winkler verlässt das Haus	Doris Dörrie	Germany
Hundan: An Echo of a Dirge		Karamat Ali	Pakistan
Infinitely Dense		Ace Thor	United States
Jim Queen	Jim Queen à la recherche de la Chloroqueer	Nicolas Athane, Marco Nguyen	France
Labrador: Autopsy of Silence	Labrador - Autopsie du silence	Rodrigue Jean	Canada
Leftover		Salim Ahamed	India
The Lychee Road		Da Peng	China
Man of Valor	Sgt. Haane	Tearepa Kahi	New Zealand, Tunisia
Matter of Time		Jeremy Snead	United States
Milo		Nicole Garcia	France
Mimics		Kristoffer Polaha	United States
Les Misérables		Fred Cavayé	France
Muganga: The One Who Treats		Marie-Hélène Roux	France, Belgium
The Nest	El nido	Hugo Stuven	Spain
Mushroom Cloud: A Hibakusha Story		James Medina	Japan, United States
No Limbs No Limits		Matthew Thayer	United States
No Paradise If You Are Killed by a Woman		Halkawt Mustafa	Norway, Iraq, Sweden, United Arab Emirates
The Noise of New Things	Il rumore delle cose nuove	Paolo Genovese	Italy
Oddities		Tyler Savage	United States
One Minute to Midnight	Un peu avant minuit	Nicolas Pariser	France
One Perfect Date		Lucas Frison	Canada
Operation Cronos	Cronos	Fernando González Molina	Spain
Our Share of Sand		Shalini Adnani	United Kingdom, India, Greece
Painless	Nessun Dolore	Gianni Amelio	Italy
A Place to Heal	15/18	Cédric Kahn	France
Red Snow	Punaista lunta	Ilja Rautsi	Finland
Robert Richardson: The White Devil		Jana Hojdová	Czech Republic
Rags 2 Richmond		TJ Gavel	Canada, Hong Kong
Rainbow the Killer		Rupan Bal	Canada
A Rare Breed		Sam Johnson	United Kingdom
Rock Bottom	Gungo y los juegos cavernícolas	Gabriel Riva Palacio Alatriste, Rodolfo Riva Palacio Alatriste	Mexico, Spain
Singh 2.0		Amrinder Goraya	Canada
Superthings: The Movie	Superthings: La pélicula	Victor Monigote	Spain
She Dances		Rick Gomez	United States
Silent Life: The Rudolph Valentino Centennial		Vladislav Kozlov	United States
Skintown		Kieron J. Walsh	Ireland, United Kingdom
Someone's Daughter		Wiebke von Carolsfeld	Canada
Straight Shot		Gabriel Sabloff	United States
Tracing Footprints		Tyrone D. Dixon	Barbados
Trick	Scherzetto	Mario Martone	Italy
The Ultimate Planet		Nikolay Rybnikov	Yemen, Morocco, Russia
Wacko		Matthew Roch	United States
Zombucha!		Claudia Dzienny	Australia
Zoners		Stephan Zlotescu	United States
