= Michael Del Monte =

Canadian documentary filmmaker

- Citizenship: Canadian
- Education: University of Western Ontario, University of Toronto.
- Occupation: Documentary filmmaker
- Known for: Transformer

Michael Del Monte is a Canadian documentary filmmaker best known for writing and directing the 2017 film Transformer.

== Life and career ==
Del Monte received a B.A. in philosophy from the University of Western Ontario. He completed his master's in theology at the University of Toronto.

While on a training camp for the 2012 Olympic Trials, Del Monte got injured. A teammate had a DSLR camera, so Del Monte began making short profile pieces for the popular running website Flotrack. He decided to give filmmaking a shot and at a race in London, Ontario, Del Monte approached 2012 Boston Marathon champion Wesley Korir, and asked if he could do a documentary on him. He met who would become his longtime producer and collaborator, Tad Munnings. The documentary, Transcend, was executive produced by Frank Marshall/The Kennedy Marshall Company and was acquired by Netflix and ESPN.

Del Monte's second feature documentary, Transformer, followed competitive bodybuilder Janae Kroc as she coped with the process of gender transition. The film won several awards at film festivals, including the Hot Docs Audience Award at the 2018 Hot Docs Canadian International Documentary Festival. Del Monte received the Emerging Canadian Filmmaker award that year as well. The documentary was acquired by Netflix in 2018.

In 2019 he directed the television documentary Village of the Missing, an examination of the 2010–2017 Toronto serial homicides by Bruce McArthur in Toronto's Church and Wellesley gay village, for the CBC Television documentary series CBC Docs POV.

Del Monte's third feature documentary, His Name Is Ray, follows a homeless heroin addict on the streets of Toronto, as he tries to get back on his sailboat. The film premiered at Hot Docs in 2021. It later played at the TIFF Lightbox in November 2022. It went on to win Best International Documentary and Special Jury Prize at Melbourne Documentary Festival.

His 2026 short film Fight Kid, his first foray into fiction filmmaking, premiered in the Short Cuts program at the 2026 Toronto International Film Festival, where it was the winner of the Best Canadian Short Film award.
