= To the Woods =

To the Woods may refer to:

- To the Woods (2012 film), also known as Cesta do lesa, a Czech film directed by Tomáš Vorel,
- To the Woods (2025 film), also known as Une fugue, a French animated short film directed by Agnès Patron.
