= Fight Kid =

2026 Canadian docudrama film

- Directed by: Michael Del Monte
- Written by: Michael Del Monte
- Produced by: Todd Munnings; Jackie Pal
- Starring: Eddie Triana; Isaiah Triana
- Cinematography: Alexander Alexandrov
- Edited by: Michael Del Monte
- Production companies: M Films; Dame & Daughters
- Distributed by: AOD Films
- Release date: September 12, 2026 (TIFF)
- Running time: 16 minutes
- Country: Canada
- Language: English

Fight Kid is a Canadian short docudrama film, directed by Michael Del Monte and released in 2026. The film is a partially improvised drama fictionalizing the real-life relationship between Eduardo "Eddie" Triana and his son Isaiah, whom he is training to compete in youth boxing.

The film had its roots in a documentary television project that Del Monte had wanted to make about youth combat sports competitions. After struggling to secure funding, he was encouraged by Derek Cianfrance to make something smaller and more manageable, and contacted the Trianas, whom he had met in the process of developing the original series, with a proposal to make a partially scripted short drama film comparable to Chloé Zhao's 2017 film The Rider.

The film premiered in the Short Cuts program at the 2026 Toronto International Film Festival, where it was the winner of the Best Canadian Short Film award.
