= Our Friend =

2019 film by Gabriela Cowperthwaite

- Release poster
- Directed by: Gabriela Cowperthwaite
- Screenplay by: Brad Ingelsby
- Based on: "The Friend: Love Is Not a Big Enough Word" by Matthew Teague
- Produced by: Michael Pruss; Teddy Schwarzman; Ryan Stowell; Kevin J. Walsh
- Starring: Jason Segel; Dakota Johnson; Casey Affleck
- Cinematography: Joe Anderson
- Edited by: Colin Patton
- Music by: Rob Simonsen
- Production companies: Black Bear Pictures; Scott Free Productions
- Distributed by: Gravitas Ventures
- Release dates: September 6, 2019 (TIFF); January 22, 2021 (United States)
- Running time: 124 minutes
- Country: United States
- Language: English
- Budget: $10 million
- Box office: $795,506

Our Friend is a 2019 American biographical drama film directed by Gabriela Cowperthwaite and written by Brad Ingelsby, based on Matthew Teague's 2015 Esquire article "The Friend: Love Is Not a Big Enough Word". It stars Jason Segel, Dakota Johnson, and Casey Affleck.

The film had its world premiere under its original title The Friend at the Toronto International Film Festival on September 6, 2019, and was released in the United States on January 22, 2021, by Gravitas Ventures. It grossed $795,506 on a $10 million budget.

== Plot ==
In the winter of 2013, Matt and Nicole Teague prepare to tell their daughters, Molly and Evie, that Nicole's ovarian cancer is terminal. Outside, their best friend, Dane Faucheux, keeps the children company.

In a flashback to 2000, Matt, a journalist, and Nicole, a theater performer, live in New Orleans. She introduces Matt to Dane, a friend from college working as a camera operator who dreams of becoming a stand-up comic. The three become close over the years. In 2008, Matt and Nicole reside in Fairhope with their daughters. Matt works as a war correspondent and spends months overseas, putting a strain on the family. Meanwhile, Dane remains in New Orleans working dead-end jobs. On Thanksgiving, Dane, unhappy with his life, decides to backpack at the Grand Canyon without telling anyone where he is going. Another backpacker recognizes his potential suicidal behavior and offers support. Her gesture of kindness, plus an unexpected voicemail from the Teague family, renews Dane's will to live. In 2010, Matt discovers that Nicole had an affair. With Dane's help, they reconcile their relationship. Dane returns home where he works as a manager at a sporting goods store and begins dating a woman named Kat.

In September 2012, Nicole receives her diagnosis and begins to undergo chemotherapy. Recognizing their need for help, Dane offers to stay with them for a few weeks. However, as Nicole's condition worsens, Dane decides to remain with them, taking on many household duties. Kat struggles to understand Dane's loyalty to the Teague family after weeks turn into months, and they break up. On Christmas, Nicole ruptures her abdomen, and Dane is left to watch over the girls. Following her surgery, the doctor reveals to Matt that Nicole's cancer has spread and gives her approximately six months to live. Nicole decides that she does not want to tell their daughters until her quality of life declines significantly.

Nicole prepares a bucket list which Matt and Dane help her accomplish; such as sitting as Grand Marshal of the Mardi Gras parade, swimming in a historic fountain with all of her friends, and writing letters to her daughters for future life events. As 2013 closes and Nicole becomes sicker, they decide to tell their daughters and Dane listens on in sorrow as the girls cry.

By the summer of 2014, Nicole becomes increasingly irritable, hallucinates, and experiences pain. Realizing that Matt is overwhelmed, Dane takes him hiking. Upon their return, Matt realizes that they are no longer equipped to care for Nicole so he calls a hospice nurse, Faith Pruett. Nicole's friends and family visit with her one last time. One night, Faith alerts them of Nicole's slowing heart rate, and they take her to the beach to watch one final sunrise. Returning home, Nicole dies with Matt and Dane at her side.

Following Nicole's funeral, Dane confines himself to his room and grieves alone. Matt writes an article called "The Friend", which he gives to Dane. Dane finally decides to go home after putting his life on hold to live with the Teague family for over fourteen months. Matt embraces Dane, expressing that simply saying "Thank you" isn't enough. In the epilogue, it is revealed that Matt's article won an award in Esquire magazine and that he and his daughters remain in Fairhope. Dane remains close to the Teague family and marries in 2019.

== Cast ==
- Casey Affleck as Matthew Teague
- Dakota Johnson as Nicole Teague
- Jason Segel as Dane Faucheux
- Cherry Jones as Faith Pruett
- Jake Owen as Aaron
- Denée Benton as Charlotte
- Gwendoline Christie as Teresa
- Reed Diamond as Peter
- Isabella Rice as Molly Teague
- Violet McGraw as Evangeline “Evie” Teague
- Marielle Scott as Kat
- Ahna O'Reilly as Gale
- Azita Ghanizada as Elizabeth
- Sampley Barinaga as Kenny
- Richard Speight Jr. as Davey Faucheux

== Production ==
In January 2019, it was announced Casey Affleck, Dakota Johnson, Jason Segel and Jake Owen had been cast in the drama film The Friend, with Gabriela Cowperthwaite directing from a screenplay by Brad Ingelsby, based upon an Esquire article by Matthew Teague. Gwendoline Christie and Cherry Jones were among additional casting announced in February.

Filming began on February 19, 2019, in Fairhope, Alabama.

== Release ==
The film had its world premiere under the title The Friend at the Toronto International Film Festival on September 6, 2019. It also was screened at AFI Fest on November 16, 2019. In January 2020, Roadside Attractions and Gravitas Ventures acquired the US distribution rights to the film. It was retitled Our Friend, and released in theaters and on premium video on demand (PVOD) in the United States on January 22, 2021.

== Reception ==
=== Critical response ===
Review aggregator website Rotten Tomatoes reported that 85% of 113 critics gave the film a positive review, with an average rating of 7.3/10. The site's critics consensus reads: "Our Friend's occasionally frustrating approach to dramatizing its fact-based story is often offset by a trio of starring performances led by a never-better Jason Segel." Metacritic assigned the film a weighted average score of 57 out of 100, based on 20 critics, indicating "mixed or average reviews".

Ella Kemp from The Playlist praised the performances stating: "The Friend is successfully anchored by its three leading players... The sensitivity of these performances, particularly from Affleck and Segel, offers a reckoning on sincere friendship and the limits of devotion that remains with the viewer, long after the days of waiting and the years of pain have finally come to an end."

Katey Rich of Vanity Fair said: "It succeeds by sticking closely to the important specifics ... It's a small-scale human story, precious few of which make it to film these days. It's also, if you're in the market for that kind of thing, an extremely effective tearjerker." Conversely, Peter Debruge of Variety wrote: "So much of the unpleasantness has been scrubbed from the picture, until what remains is precisely the kind of dishonest, sanitized no-help-to-anyone TV-movie version of death that inspired Teague to set the record straight in the first place."

Sheila O'Malley, writing for Roger Ebert's film criticism website, gave it a 3 star rating.
