= Matt Barats =

American actor and comedian

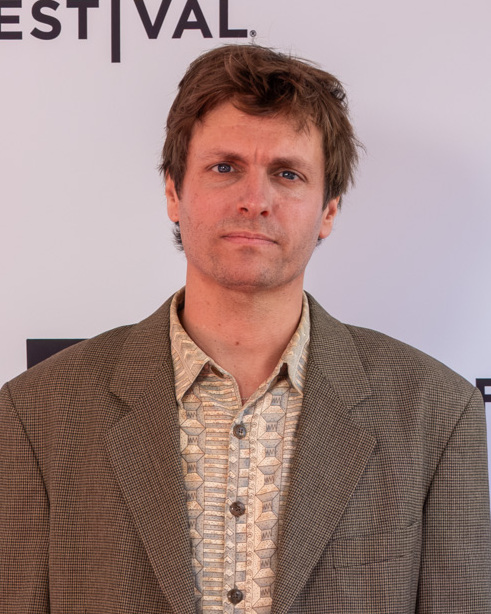
- Barats in 2026
- Born: Boise, Idaho
- Education: University of Colorado Boulder (BFA)
- Occupations: Comedian; Actor; Filmmaker
- Years active: 2010s–present
- Website: mattbarats.com

Matt Barats is an American comedic actor, writer, and filmmaker known for his work in experimental and alternative comedy, including the feature film Cash Cow (2023) and the Reveries trilogy. His acting roles include appearances on HBO, Netflix, and various independent films. Barats has garnered attention for his unique storytelling, blending elements of comedy, satire, and personal reflection. His latest feature film Anchors Aweigh premiered at the 2026 Toronto International Film Festival.

== Early life and education ==
Barats was born in Boise, Idaho, and attended the University of Colorado Boulder.

== Career ==
Barats lived in Chicago and performed regularly at the Annoyance Theatre, iO, and was a cast member in the Holy Fuck Comedy Hour. He was named a New Face at the 2015 Just For Laughs Festival in Montreal. In New York, he performed stand-up and live shows including Sadie Hawkins Day and sketch group Postmen. In 2017 Barats wrote and starred in the short Improv is Love which was described by The New York Times as "a brutal, concise sendup of the ‘do what you love’ philosophy of life."

Barats co-created the Reveries series with comedian Anthony Oberbeck, including the films Reveries (2018), Reveries: Going Deeper (2020), and Reveries: The Mind Prison (2025) directed by Graham Mason. Reveries was described by Vulture as "…like an Ayahuasca session conducted by Mitch Hedberg…an endorsement for unbridled creativity and experimentation and a marvel of artistic devotion."

Barats wrote, directed, and starred in the 2023 feature film Cash Cow, a low-budget hybrid comedy-documentary which premiered at the Slamdance Film Festival. The film appeared on Esquire's list of the Best Movies of 2023 and was released by Cartuna.

He wrote, directed, and starred in Anchors Aweigh which premiered at the 2026 Toronto International Film Festival as part of the Midnight Madness program on September 16, 2026.

=== Additional work ===
Barats has appeared in numerous television projects including HBO's High Maintenance, White House Plumbers, Last Week Tonight with John Oliver, Fantasmas, TBS's The Last O.G., Search Party, and Netflix's Partner Track. He starred in the indie comedy feature Inspector Ike and appears in Cole Escola’s TV pilot Our Home Out West and various other feature films including Never Change! and The Scout.

== Selected filmography ==
- Improv is Love (short) (2017)
- Reveries (2018)
- Here We Have Idaho (2020)
- Reveries: Going Deeper (2020)
- Cash Cow (2023)
- Reveries: The Mind Prison (2025)
- Anchors Aweigh (2026)
