= Tehran, Under the Skin =

- Directed by: Afsaneh Salari
- Written by: Afsaneh Salari
- Produced by: Christian Popp; Afsaneh Salari; Ashley J. Smith; Mario Adamson
- Cinematography: Mohamad Hadadi
- Edited by: Audrey Maurion
- Music by: Shida Shahabi
- Production companies: Yami 2; Docmaniacs; TANJO Films; Sisyfos Film
- Release date: September 15, 2026 (TIFF)
- Running time: 84 minutes
- Countries: France; Iran; Sweden
- Language: Persian

Tehran, Under the Skin is a 2026 documentary film that explores the cosmetic surgery industry in Iran. It was directed by Afsaneh Salari.
