= The Scout (2025 film) =

2025 American drama film

- Theatrical release poster
- Directed by: Paula González-Nasser
- Written by: Paula González-Nasser
- Produced by: Paula González-Nasser; Ryan Martin Brown; Matthew Romanski
- Starring: Mimi Davila; Rutanya Alda; Max Rosen; Ikechukwu Ufomadu; Sarah Herrman; Otmara Marrero; Matt Barats
- Cinematography: Nicola Newton
- Edited by: Ryan Martin Brown; Byron Leon
- Music by: Dan Arnés
- Production companies: 5th Floor Pictures; Mongoose Picture House; Fair Oaks Entertainment; Alina Pictures
- Distributed by: Greenwich Entertainment
- Release dates: June 5, 2025 (Tribeca); September 25, 2026 (United States)
- Running time: 89 minutes
- Country: United States
- Language: English
- Box office: $82,904

The Scout is a 2025 American drama film, written, directed, and produced by Paula González-Nasser, in her directorial debut. It stars Mimi Davila, Rutanya Alda, Max Rosen, Ikechukwu Ufomadu, Sarah Herrman, Otmara Marrero and Matt Barats.

It had its world premiere at the Tribeca Festival on June 5, 2025, and it was released on September 25, 2026, by Greenwich Entertainment.

== Premise ==
A location scout is tasked with finding the perfect interiors for a television pilot.

== Cast ==
- Mimi Davila as Sofia
- Rutanya Alda as Anna
- Max Rosen as Tyler
- Ikechukwu Ufomadu as Lance
- Sarah Herrman as Angie
- Otmara Marrero as Becca
- Matt Barats as Josh

== Production ==
Paula González-Nasser wrote the screenplay based upon her experience of working as a location scout for six years. Principal photography took place in May 2024, over ten days.

== Release ==
It had its world premiere at the 2025 Tribeca Festival on June 6, 2025. In February 2026, Greenwich Entertainment acquired distribution rights to the film. The film was released on September 25, 2026.

== Reception ==
=== Critical reception ===
On the review aggregator website Rotten Tomatoes, 90% of 21 critics' reviews are positive, with an average rating of 7/10. Metacritic, which uses a weighted average, assigned the film a score of 75 out of 100, based on 7 critics, indicating "generally favorable" reviews.
