= James Marcus Haney =

American photographer and filmmaker (born 1988)

- Born: April 7, 1988 (age 38); Upland, California, US
- Known for: photography, filmmaking
- Notable work: Sen Fermin Running of the Bulls, Folks of Far away:The Faroe Islands, No Cameras Allowed, Austin to Boston, Spin Magazine, Breaking the Triangle

James Marcus Haney (born April 7, 1988, in Upland, CA) is an American photographer and filmmaker.

== Career ==
Haney's career as a music photographer and documentary filmmaker began with sneaking into music festivals. In 2010 Haney snuck into Coachella Music Festival by creating a fake wristband and buying a vintage USC camera. The security guards at Coachella took one look at his wristband and camera and let him in. Since then, Haney has snuck into over fifty festivals and events, including Bonnaroo, Glastonbury and The Grammy Awards. Mumford & Sons asked Haney to join their Railroad Revival Tour in 2011 after seeing Haney's documentary Connaroo, which contained footage of their band at Bonnaroo. Within the same year his photo was published in Rolling Stone. His most recent documentary, No Cameras Allowed follows his adventures of sneaking into festivals. To this day, Haney has never paid to go to a music festival.

Haney is now Mumford & Sons official photographer and is on tour in Australia for his now cult film No Cameras Allowed, which is being screened exclusively by Jack Daniel's Future Legends.

His 2026 film Black Sunflowers premiered in the TIFF Docs program at the 2026 Toronto International Film Festival, where it was first runner-up for the People's Choice Award for Documentaries.

== Documentaries ==
- No Cameras Allowed (2014)
- Austin to Boston (2014)
- Black Sunflowers (2026)

== Short films ==
- Breaking the Triangle (2015)
- Spin Magazine – Backstage Pass: Mumford & Sons (2011)
- Folks of Far Away: The Faroe Islands (2011)
- San Fermin Running of the Bulls (2010)

== Music videos ==
- Mumford & Sons – Woman (2019)
- Boys Off Work – The Ruminaters (2018)
- Bad Bad Things – The Ruminaters (2017)
- Coldplay – Birds (2016)
- Coldplay – A Head Full of Dreams (2016)
- Mumford & Sons – The Wolf (2015)
- Bear's Den – Elysium (2014)
- The Staves – Facing West (2013)
- Foy Vance – Joy of Nothing (2013)
- Elton John – Mexican Vacation (Kids in the Candlelight) (2013)
- Deap Vally – End of the World (2012)
- Young the Giant – Apartment (2012)
