= Gail (2026 film) =

2026 Canadian documentary film

- Directed by: Michael Maxxis
- Produced by: Natalie Allan; Morgan Gold; Raine Maida; Michael Maxxis; Jason Murray; Shane Reid
- Starring: Gail Lichtman
- Cinematography: Morgan Gold
- Edited by: Cole Grom
- Music by: Lesley Barber
- Production companies: Marching Orb; Vector Films
- Release date: September 12, 2026 (TIFF)
- Running time: 92 minutes
- Country: Canada
- Language: English

Gail is a Canadian documentary film, directed by Michael Maxxis and slated for release in 2026. The film is a portrait of Gail Lichtman, an older woman from New York who is a fan of Canadian rock band Our Lady Peace, as she follows the band across Canada on their 30th anniversary tour in 2025.

The film is slated to premiere in the TIFF Docs program at the 2026 Toronto International Film Festival.
