= Anne Murray: Full Circle =

2021 Canadian documentary film

- Directed by: Adrian Buitenhuis; Morgan Elliott
- Written by: Adrian Buitenhuis; Erin Cumming
- Produced by: Adrian Buitenhuis; John Barbisan
- Starring: Anne Murray
- Cinematography: Shaun Lawless; Scot Proudfoot
- Production company: Network Entertainment
- Distributed by: CBC Television
- Release date: December 2, 2021
- Running time: 92 minutes
- Country: Canada
- Language: English

Anne Murray: Full Circle is a 2021 Canadian documentary film, directed by Adrian Buitenhuis and Morgan Elliott. The film is a portrait of Canadian singer Anne Murray, including both contemporary interview footage of Murray reflecting on her career and previously unseen archival footage.

Other figures appearing in the film to discuss Murray and her career include Shania Twain, Kenny Loggins, Bonnie Raitt, k.d. lang, Jann Arden, Bruce Allen and Gordon Lightfoot.

The film received an exclusive one-night theatrical screening at selected Cineplex theatres throughout Canada on December 2, in advance of its television broadcast on December 17 on CBC Television and CBC Gem.
