= Adrian Buitenhuis =

Canadian director of documentary films

Adrian Buitenhuis is a Canadian director of documentary films from Vancouver, British Columbia. He is best known for his I Am series of television documentary films about the lives and careers of celebrities.

A graduate of the film studies program at Simon Fraser University, he worked in the early 2010s as a field producer for various American talk shows before debuting I Am Heath Ledger, the first I Am film, in 2017. He released several other films in the series, concluding with I Am Burt Reynolds in 2020.

In 2021 he released Anne Murray: Full Circle, his first documentary outside the I Am series.

His latest film, Man in Motion: The Rick Hansen Story, premiered at the 2026 Toronto International Film Festival.

== Filmography ==
- Chuckles - 2009
- Highway 99 - 2010
- I Am Heath Ledger - 2017
- I Am Sam Kinison - 2017
- I Am Paul Walker - 2018
- I Am Patrick Swayze - 2019
- I Am Burt Reynolds - 2020
- Anne Murray: Full Circle - 2021
- Our Time to Be Kind - 2024
- Brats - 2024 (producer and cinematographer)
- Man in Motion: The Rick Hansen Story - 2026
