= Pretenders (2026 film) =

2026 documentary film by Joss Crowley

Pretenders is a 2026 documentary film which follows the career of Chrissie Hynde and her band The Pretenders. It was directed by Joss Crowley. It premiered at the 2026 Toronto International Film Festival.
