= The Black Box Is Orange =

2026 Canadian documentary film

- Directed by: Yuula Benivolski
- Written by: Yuula Benivolski
- Produced by: Yuula Benivolski; Nora Rosenthal
- Cinematography: Yuula Benivolski
- Edited by: Yuula Benivolski
- Music by: Katie Stelmanis
- Release date: September 13, 2026 (TIFF)
- Running time: 90 minutes
- Country: Canada
- Languages: Arabic; English; Hebrew

The Black Box Is Orange is a Canadian documentary film, directed by Yuula Benivolski and released in 2026. The film is a personal essay about her childhood in Shlomi, a heavily militarized Israeli town on the northern border with Lebanon which was previously the Palestinian village of Al-Bassa, documenting both her childhood immersion in Zionist ideology and her evolution toward opposing it as an adult.

The film premiered in the Wavelengths program at the 2026 Toronto International Film Festival, where it received an honorable mention from the Best Canadian Discovery award jury.
