= Man in Motion: The Rick Hansen Story =

2026 Canadian documentary film

- Film poster
- Directed by: Adrian Buitenhuis
- Produced by: Derik Murray; Ryan Reynolds
- Starring: Rick Hansen
- Cinematography: Ian Kerr
- Edited by: Graham Kew; Sandro Desaulniers; Freya Maude
- Music by: Edo Van Breemen; Jeffrey Innes
- Production companies: Network Entertainment; Maximum Effort
- Distributed by: Network Entertainment
- Release date: September 11, 2026 (TIFF)
- Running time: 96 minutes
- Country: Canada
- Language: English

Man in Motion: The Rick Hansen Story is a 2026 Canadian documentary film, directed by Adrian Buitenhuis. The film profiles Rick Hansen, the Canadian wheelchair athlete who undertook the Man in Motion world tour in the 1980s to promote disability awareness and accessibility. Ryan Reynolds produced through Maximum Effort.

The film premiered at the 2026 Toronto International Film Festival, where it received an honorable mention from the Best Canadian Film award jury.
