= Ladies and Gentlemen, Brian Mulroney =

2026 Canadian documentary film

- French: Mesdames et Messieurs, Brian Mulroney
- Directed by: Matthew Rankin
- Written by: Matthew Rankin
- Produced by: Pierre-Mathieu Fortin
- Starring: Brian Mulroney; Pierre Elliott Trudeau; Robert Stanfield; John Turner; John Diefenbaker; Joe Clark
- Cinematography: Alexandre Lampron
- Edited by: Matthew Rankin
- Music by: Christophe Lamarche-Ledoux
- Production company: National Film Board of Canada
- Release date: September 15, 2026 (TIFF)
- Running time: 105 minutes
- Country: Canada
- Languages: English; French

Ladies and Gentlemen, Brian Mulroney (French: Mesdames et Messieurs, Brian Mulroney) is a 2026 Canadian documentary film, directed by Matthew Rankin. Described as a gonzo documentary, the film profiles Brian Mulroney, the Prime Minister of Canada from 1984 to 1993, through the prism of media clips of both Mulroney himself and other political and cultural figures of the era, using a collage format to present a "fever dream of politics, propaganda and pop culture".

Production was first announced by the National Film Board of Canada in 2023, initially as a four-episode documentary series.

The film premiered in the Midnight Madness program at the 2026 Toronto International Film Festival.

== Reception ==
Metacritic, which uses a weighted average, assigned the film a score of 69 out of 100, based on 4 critics, indicating "generally favorable review".

== Awards ==
At TIFF, it won the People's Choice Award for Midnight Madness.

It was later screened at the Windsor International Film Festival, where it won the $25,000 WIFF Prize in Canadian Film.
