= Ghislaine Maxwell: Filthy Rich =

- Directed by: Maiken Baird; Lisa Bryant
- Produced by: Lori Gordon-Logan
- Music by: Julia Zuzanna Sokolowska
- Production companies: RadicalMedia; Third Eye Motion Picture Company
- Distributed by: Netflix
- Release date: November 25, 2022
- Country: United States
- Language: English

Ghislaine Maxwell: Filthy Rich is an American Netflix original documentary film directed by Maiken Baird and Lisa Bryant. The film succeeds the 2020 miniseries Jeffrey Epstein: Filthy Rich, created by the same filmmakers. Its story is centered around the sex-trafficking trial of Ghislaine Maxwell, accomplice to Jeffrey Epstein, and details how she assisted in recruiting teenage girls who would be deceived into performing sexual acts on Epstein.

British journalist and author Petronella Wyatt appears in the film and was a consultant for the production. The film was released on November 25, 2022.
