= Village of the Missing =

2019 Canadian documentary television film

- Written by: Michael Del Monte; Paul Kemp
- Directed by: Michael Del Monte
- Country of origin: Canada
- Original language: English

Production
- Producers: Paul Kemp; Tad Munnings
- Cinematography: Martin Buzora; Michael Del Monte; Owen Deveney; Robert Fantinatto; Brian Hunt; Tim Hutchinson; Tad Munnings; Evan Seccombe; Nicholas Taylor
- Editors: Michael Del Monte; Robert Fantinatto; Deanna Scriver
- Running time: 44 minutes
- Production company: Paul Kemp Productions

Original release
- Network: CBC Television
- Release: March 22, 2019

Village of the Missing is a 2019 Canadian documentary film, directed by Michael Del Monte. An examination of the 2010–2017 Toronto serial homicides by Bruce McArthur in Toronto's Church and Wellesley gay village, the film premiered on March 22, 2019 as an episode of the CBC Television documentary series CBC Docs POV.

The film was nominated for the Donald Brittain Award at the 8th Canadian Screen Awards.
