= I Am Heath Ledger =

- Written by: Hart Snider
- Directed by: Derik Murray; Adrian Buitenhuis
- Starring: Heath Ledger
- Music by: David Ramos
- Original language: English

Production
- Running time: 90 minutes
- Production company: Network Entertainment

Original release
- Release: 11 May 2017

I Am Heath Ledger is a 2017 Paramount Network documentary film about actor Heath Ledger, who died in 2008. Directed by Adrian Buitenhuis and Derik Murray, the film presents interviews with Ledger's family, friends, and collaborators.

== Featured cast of subjects ==
- Heath Ledger as himself (archive footage)
- Ben Harper as himself, musician and friend of Ledger's
- N'fa as himself, musician and friend of Ledger's
- Ben Mendelsohn as himself, actor and friend of Ledger’s
- Naomi Watts as herself, actress and ex-partner of Ledger’s
- Djimon Hounsou as himself, actor
- Emile Hirsch as himself, actor
- Ang Lee as himself, filmmaker
- Matt Amato as himself, filmmaker
- Catherine Hardwicke as herself, filmmaker
- Edward Lachman as himself, filmmaker
- Christina Cauchi as herself, model and ex-partner of Ledger’s
- Justin Vernon as himself, musician (Bon Iver)
- Mia Doi Todd as herself, musician
- Grace Woodroofe as herself, musician
- Carlos Niño as himself, music producer
- Steve Alexander as himself, agent
- Gerry Grennell as himself, dialect coach
- Ledger's parents Sally and Kim, sisters Kate, Olivia and Ashleigh, and childhood friends

Notably Michelle Williams, ex-partner of Ledger and mother of his daughter Matilda, was not in the film.

== Production ==
Ledger's family agreed to participate only after Williams "gave her blessing" and when Ledger's friend Matt Amato got involved in the project.

== Reception ==
On the review aggregator website Rotten Tomatoes, the film has a score of 86% based on 29 reviews. The website's consensus reads: "I Am Heath Ledger takes a poignant, absorbing look at the private life and process of a talented star doomed to meet a tragic end."
