= Almost Pink =

2026 Canadian short film

- French: Presque rose
- Directed by: Justine Prince
- Written by: Justine Prince
- Produced by: Mérédith Gonzalez-Bayard; Antoine Rivard-Nolin
- Starring: Maïka Ferron; Frédéric Lemay
- Cinematography: Xavier Bossé
- Edited by: Louis Lachance
- Music by: Louis-Joseph Cliche
- Production company: Couronne Nord
- Release date: September 14, 2026 (TIFF)
- Running time: 16 minutes
- Country: Canada
- Language: French

Almost Pink (French: Presque rose) is a Canadian short drama film, directed by Justine Prince and released in 2026. Centred on the issue of the sexual exploitation of teenagers, the film stars Maïka Ferron as Solène, a teenage girl who has a dangerous interaction with a man (Frédéric Lemay) after basketball practice.

The film premiered in the Short Cuts program at the 2026 Toronto International Film Festival, where it received an honorable mention from the Best Canadian Short Film award jury. It is also slated to screen in the national competition for short films at the 2026 Festival du nouveau cinéma.
