= Toronto International Film Festival Award for Best Animated Short Film =

Annual Canadian film award

The Toronto International Film Festival Best Animated Short Film Award is an annual film award, presented by the Toronto International Film Festival to a film judged to be the best animated short in that year's program.

The award was presented for the first time in 2025.

== Winners ==
Year	Film	Director	Reference
2025	To the Woods (Une fugue)	Agnès Patron	
2026	Into the Betaverse	Varun Raman, Tom Hancock	
2026	Terminal	Alexandre Siqueira	
