= Adam Pietkiewicz =

Polish cinematographer

- Pietkiewicz in 2026

Adam Pietkiewicz is a Polish cinematographer currently based in London, England. He is most noted for his work on the films Wrooklyn Zoo, for which he was a nominee for Best Cinematography in the Polish Films Competition at the 32nd International Film Festival of the Art of Cinematography Camerimage, and Angh, for which he received the Variety Artisan Award at the 2026 Toronto International Film Festival.

== Filmography ==
- Wrooklyn Zoo (2024)
- Baby Reindeer (2024)
- Angh (2026)
