= Anchors Aweigh (2026 film) =

2026 comedy film by Matt Barats

- Directed by: Matt Barats
- Written by: Matt Barats
- Produced by: Whit Conway; Allie Viti
- Starring: Matt Barats; Serena Profaci; Mike Holt; Felipe Di Poi Tamargo; Ana Fabrega
- Release date: September 16, 2026 (TIFF)
- Running time: 71 minutes
- Country: United States
- Language: English

Anchors Aweigh is an American comedy film written and directed by Matt Barats. The film premiered in the Midnight Madness program at the 2026 Toronto International Film Festival.
