= Into the Betaverse =

2026 Briitsh short film

- Directed by: Varun Raman; Tom Hancock
- Written by: Varun Raman; Tom Hancock
- Produced by: Chuckie McEwan; Archie Sinclair
- Starring: Andrew Ellis; Colin Silva; Olivia Frances Brown
- Cinematography: James Oldham
- Edited by: Darrin Brading
- Music by: Mitchell Sloan
- Production companies: BFI Network; Grey Moth
- Release date: 16 September 2026 (TIFF)
- Running time: 14 minutes
- Country: United Kingdom
- Language: English

Into the Betaverse is a 2026 British short film, directed by Varun Raman and Tom Hancock. A hybrid of live action and animation, the film stars Andrew Ellis as Gary, a man who has just proposed to his girlfriend Chantelle (Olivia Frances Brown), even though their relationship exists only in the virtual Betaverse and they have never met in person; meanwhile, Gary's roommate Dave (Colin Silva) suspects that Chantelle is a scammer, and also enters the Betaverse in order to spy on them.

According to the filmmakers, the film was conceived in part as a satire of the Metaverse, in particular the way it and other virtual reality initiatives are pitched as democratizing spaces, but instead often replicate and entrench social and economic class differences through tiered access and paywalls.

The film premiered in the Short Cuts program at the 2026 Toronto International Film Festival, where it was the winner of the Best Animated Short Film award.
