= To the Woods (2025 film) =

- French: Une fugue
- Directed by: Agnès Patron
- Screenplay by: Johanna Krawczyk
- Produced by: Ron Dyens
- Music by: Pierre Oberkampf
- Production company: Sacrebleu Productions
- Release date: 14 May 2025 (Cannes)
- Running time: 15 minutes
- Country: France

To the Woods (French: Une fugue) is a French animated short film, directed by Agnès Patron and released in 2025. The film depicts a woman's hazy and fragmented memories of going into the forest with her brother as a child, becoming increasingly abstract as the film suggests, without ever explicitly depicting, that the brother may have died in the forest.

The film premiered in the Cannes Critics' Week program at the 2025 Cannes Film Festival. It was later screened at the 2025 Toronto International Film Festival, where it won the award for Best Animated Short Film.

== Fiche technique ==
- Original Title : Une Fugue
- International Title : To The Woods
- Director : Agnès Patron
- Composer : Pierre Oberkampf
- Production company : Sacrebleu Productions
- Country of origin : France
- Language : silent
- Genre : animation
- Duration : 15 minutes
- Release date : 19 mai 2025

== Production ==
The diﬀerent shots are first animated in clean line on TV Paint, then painted by hand, frame by frame, using monitors as feedbacks. Each frame is then cut out via photoshop and placed on its background. Video shadows are integrated onto the diﬀerent shots during compositing, a key step in the film's final rendering.

== Distinctions ==
=== Récompenses ===
- TIFF 2025 : Best Animated Short Film
- Anima Brussels : Grand Prix
- Sapporo International Short Film Festival : Best Original Score
- Anibar International Animation Festival : Best International Film

=== Nominations et sélections ===
- Semaine de la Critique 2025 : Special Presentation
- Festival du court métrage de Clermont-Ferrand 2026
- Bucheon International Animation Festival 2025
- PÖFF Shorts 2025
- Aspen Shortsfest 2026
- Animafest Zagreb 2026
- Annecy International Animation Film Festival 2026
- Palm Springs International ShortFest 2026
