= Edward Said: Between Worlds =

2026 American documentary film

- Directed by: Maiken Baird
- Produced by: Sarah Mowaswes; Razan Ghalayini
- Edited by: R.A. Fedde; Alistair Mackay; Jay Arthur Sterrenberg; Plummy Tucker
- Music by: Kareem Roustom
- Production companies: Impact Partners; Louverture Films; Jigsaw Productions; Baird Films
- Distributed by: Kino Lorber
- Release date: September 12, 2026 (TIFF)
- Running time: 107 minutes
- Country: United States
- Languages: English; Arabic

Edward Said: Between Worlds is a 2026 American documentary film directed by Maiken Baird. It explores the life and career of scholar Edward Said. Alex Gibney serves as an executive producer under his Jigsaw Productions banner.

The film had its world premiere at the 2026 Toronto International Film Festival on September 12.

== Premise ==
Explores the life and career of Palestinian-American scholar Edward Said. The film is made up entirely of archival footage.

== Production ==
The film received support from CPH:DOX winning the Al Jazeera Documentary Channel Co-Production Award $10,000 prize. Alex Gibney serves as an executive producer under his Jigsaw Productions banner. Said's daughter Najla Said serves as a consulting producer.

== Release ==
The film had its world premiere at the 2026 Toronto International Film Festival on September 12. It was also selected for the Spotlight Gala section of the 2026 New York Film Festival. In November 2026, Kino Lorber acquired U.S. distribution rights to the film.
