= Janae Kroc =

American powerlifter and bodybuilder

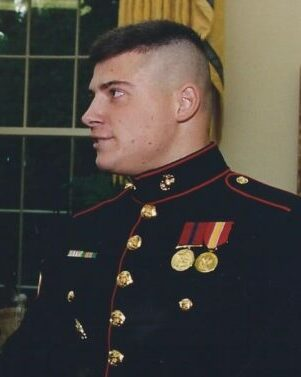
- Kroczaleski shaking hands with Bill Clinton
- Born: Matthew Raymond Kroczaleski; December 8, 1972 (age 53); Sterling, Michigan, U.S.
- Other names: Matt Kroczaleski Matt Kroc; Kroc; Janae Marie Kroc Janae Kroc
- Occupations: Marine, presidential security, powerlifter, bodybuilder, writer, pharmacist, model
- Employer: T-Nation
- Known for: Strength athletics
- Height: 5 ft 9 in (1.75 m)
- Spouse(s): Patty Stoll (married 1996–2006); Lauren Starkey (married 2010–2012)
- Children: 3
- Parents: Jerry Kroczaleski (father); Diane Kroczaleski (mother)

Janae Marie Kroczaleski (born Matthew Raymond Kroczaleski) is an American transgender powerlifter, bodybuilder, Marine veteran, and motivational speaker.

In combined (squat, bench press, and deadlift) equipped powerlifting total, on April 25, 2009, in Iowa, Kroc set the male world record in the 220 lb. weight class with 2,551 lbs (composed of 738 pound bench press, 810 pound deadlift and 1003 pound back squat), which at the time was also the fifth highest total for the 242 lb. male weight class. Kroczaleski no longer held the record as of August 21, 2010, when a 2,715 pound total was achieved by Shawn Frankl (the man who held the record prior to Kroczaleski) in Ohio.

In 2015, Kroc came out as transgender and genderfluid, taking the name 'Janae' and adopting she/her pronouns. Kroc uses the name 'Matt' and male pronouns when referring to the time before her transition.

== Career ==
=== Military ===
Kroc served in the United States Marine Corps from 1991 to 1995 and was selected for presidential security duty serving under President Bill Clinton. The tour of duty included time in Washington, D.C., providing security for military officers at the Pentagon and for some of the Joint Chiefs of Staff from 1992 to 1994. Assigned to security duty for Warren Christopher (then Secretary of State) during the United Nations conferences in 1993, Kroc was later assigned to the security force at the presidential retreat at Camp David from 1994 to 1995.

=== Powerlifting ===
Kroc began entering powerlifting contests after joining the Marines in 1991.

In 2002, Matt graduated from college and bought a home prior to the 2002 USAPL Nationals. Later, Matt went to London, Ohio, to train at a compound with Dave Tate and Jim Wendler. Kroc also trained with Mountain Dog John Meadows, Branch Warren, and Johnnie O. Jackson.

Kroc developed "kroc rows", or dumbbell rows performed with extremely heavy weight and many repetitions. One video of Kroc Rows showed 25 repetitions with 225 pounds, and has been known to perform kroc rows with 300-pound dumbbells. Kroc also described lifting 300 pounds for 13 repetitions using straps; and both 205 pounds for 30 repetitions, and 175 pounds for 40 repetitions, neither with straps. The 300x13 claim was verified at the 2010 Arnold Sports Festival.

In 2017, after 18 months on estrogen, Kroc's performance was reduced to 210 pounds for 10 repetitions and deadlifting 605 pounds.

Kroc is a world champion, a world record holding powerlifter, and a National Physique Committee bodybuilder.

=== Seminar speaking ===
In 2012, Kroc spoke at Learn To Train Seminar 4. Kroc then shared this online from December 2012 to March 2013.

=== Other ===
Kroc graduated from Ferris State University in 2002 and is a registered pharmacist working in the specialty pharmacy division of Walgreens. Kroc had careers as a sponsored athlete under contract with both EliteFTS and MuscleTech, and as an author and model, having appeared in and published articles in many magazines including Men's Fitness, Powerlifting USA, MuscleMag, and Muscle & Fitness. Kroc is also a featured author for T-Nation. Kroc created a YouTube account in 2006.

== Personal life ==
In interviews, Kroc has described growing up in a trailer in a rural conservative area. Kroc started working out with cement-filled Sears weights at six years old, and at 8 years old constructed a weight bench out of a 2x4 or 2x12 boards, on cement blocks, and made a barbell out of milk jugs filled with sand hung on a stick. Kroc weighed 118 pounds as a high school freshman, and, after graduating from high school at Standish-Sterling Central.

After marrying Patty Stoll in 1996, the couple had three children. In 2006 they divorced. Lauren Starky married Kroc in 2010 but they divorced in 2012.

Kroc's son, Garrett, died on August 1, 2022, at 22 years of age.

In 2004, Kroc was diagnosed with testicular cancer.

=== Gender transition ===
Kroc self-described as "Manliest of the Manly Men", known as an "Ultimate Alpha Male" before transitioning. Kroc came out as transgender to friends and relatives (including three sons) around 2005. In April 2015, Kroc legally changed forenames from Matthew Raymond to Janae Marie, a name chosen by Kroc's mother, a name she would have chosen for a biologically female daughter. In July of that year, Kroc came out as both transgender and genderfluid.

Kroc is living as both genders, saying she often feels like two completely different people trying to share a body, fighting for control. Kroc uses and prefers female pronouns. Kroc uses masculine pronouns when referring to the Matt era. In December 2015, Kroc's was the first featured among the top 63 most powerful comings-out of 2015.

People described an Instagram post where Kroc described undergoing facial feminization surgery more than one year before she publicly came out. Earlier articles state similarly. After an August interview by Dave Palumbo, in September Kroc announced the start of a full gender transition, starting both surgical and hormonal treatments, and stopping career lifting. In an interview from October 2015, Janae mentioned being four weeks into estrogen therapy and taking a testosterone blocker. That same month, Kroc was mentioned on the cover of Muscle & Fitness which featured an interview and a photo shoot. Kroc was formerly on the advisory board for the magazine. This was the longest (highest word-count) story published to date in Muscle & Fitness, and the first to feature a transgender athlete. A 2017 facial feminization surgery was delayed due to an infection from a cat bite.

Kroc is the subject of the 2017 documentary film Transformer.

== Awards ==
- 2006 Arnold Classic WPO Powerlifting Middle Weight Champion
- 2009 All-Time World Record setter in the 220lb class (surpassed in 2010)

== See also ==
- List of LGBT sportspeople
