= Gabriela Cowperthwaite =

American filmmaker (born 1971)

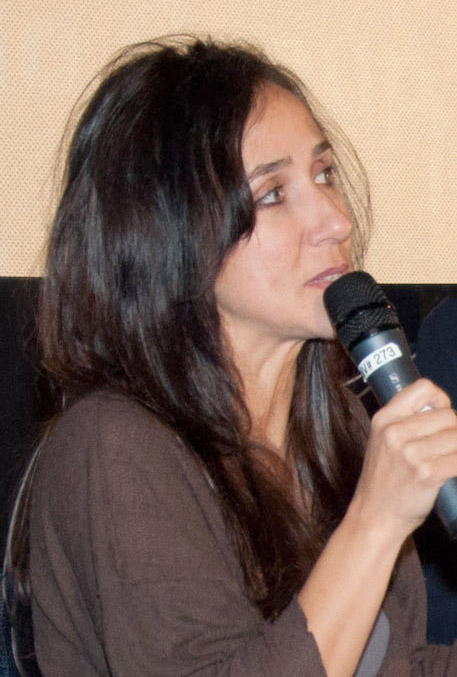
- Cowperthwaite in 2013
- Born: 1971 (age 54–55)
- Education: Occidental College; University of Southern California
- Occupations: Director, screenwriter, producer, editor
- Children: 2

Gabriela Cowperthwaite (born 1971) is an American filmmaker. She has directed documentaries and feature films, and she also produces, edits, writes, and directs for television and documentary films. Her films often deal with social, cultural, and environmental issues relating to real life events. Her most notable film is Blackfish (2013), which received a BAFTA nomination for Best Documentary.

== Early life and education ==
Cowperthwaite's mother was a Brazilian psychoanalyst, and her father was an American real estate developer. She grew up in Denver, speaking Portuguese as her first language. She also played soccer in her youth up through college.

She attended Occidental College in Los Angeles, graduating with a degree in political science and a minor in theater. She also attended grad school at USC, and graduated with an M.A. in political science.

== Career ==
After college, Cowperthwaite pursued a political science graduate degree at USC. Cowperthwaite was first involved in commissioned work on television for more than 12 years. She spent time writing, directing, and producing documentary programs for outlets such as National Geographic, ESPN, Animal Planet, The History Channel, and Discovery Channel.

In 2010, she directed City Lax: An Urban Lacrosse Story, making her debut in independent feature documentary-making. The subject was chosen by her classmate Tor Myhren, and the documentary tells the story of Tor's brother Erik, who at the time was an elementary school teacher that put together a lacrosse team in a rough urban neighbourhood to play a rich white kids' sport. The film debuted on ESPN in 2010.

In 2013, Cowperthwaite directed the documentary Blackfish, which premiered at the 2013 Sundance Film Festival, and found a larger audience on television via her distribution partner CNN. Blackfish is a controversial documentary, as it tells the story of Tilikum, an orca at the SeaWorld theme park in Orlando, Florida who killed its trainer, Dawn Brancheau. The film investigates the treatment of orcas in captivity through news and archival footage, interviews of former trainers and marine mammal experts, and questioning the ethics of captivity. The film created a new movement, called "The Blackfish Effect", and in 2016 SeaWorld announced it would stop breeding orcas and put an end to all orca performances by 2019, which was largely attributed to the film.

In 2017, her first feature film, Megan Leavey, was released. A drama based on real events, the film follows a corporal in the U.S. Marine's K9 unit, working with a German shepherd named Rex to detect explosives and weapons during the Iraq War.

In 2019, Cowperthwaite directed Our Friend, a drama film starring Casey Affleck, Dakota Johnson, and Jason Segel, revolving around real-life couple Nicole and Matthew Teague. Faced with Nicole's impending death, they have their best friend move in with them to help them out.

In 2021, Cowperthwaite directed I.S.S., a space station thriller starring Ariana Debose and Chris Messina. https://www.rogerebert.com/reviews/iss-film-review-2024#google_vignette

In 2022, Cowperthwaite's documentary The Grab, 7 years in the making, premiered at the Toronto Film Festival. https://2022.tiffr.com/shows/the-grab

In 2025, Cowperthwaite's documentary "The Grab" was nominated for four Emmy's, including Best Research Documentary, Best Investigative Documentary, Best Promotional Trailer, and Best Documentary. https://www.hollywoodreporter.com/tv/tv-news/2025-news-documentary-emmy-awards-nominations-1236204666/

== Filmography ==
Documentary film

Year	Title	Director	Producer	Writer	Notes
2010	City Lax: An Urban Lacrosse Story	Yes	Yes	No	
2013	Blackfish	Yes	Yes	Yes	Also editor (Uncredited)
2022	The Grab	Yes	Yes	Yes	

Feature film

- Megan Leavey (2017)
- Our Friend (2019)
- I.S.S. (2023)

Television

Year	Title	Director	Producer	Writer	Notes
2003	Animal Nightmares	No	Yes	Yes	Miniseries
2004	Wild West Tech	No	Associate	Yes	Wrote episode "Disaster Tech"
2005-2006	Shootout!	No	Co-producer	No	
2022	Children of the Underground	Yes	Executive	No	Directed 3 episodes

== Awards ==
Cowperthwaite's 2010 documentary, City Lax: An Urban Lacrosse Story, received the July prize for Best Documentary as well as the Audience Award at the Sonoma International Film Festival.

Blackfish (2013) earned a BAFTA nomination and an International Documentary Association Award nomination. It also made the shortlist for the Oscar feature documentary.

In 2020, she received an honorary degree from Occidental College.

== Personal life ==
Cowperthwaite lives in Los Angeles with her husband and two sons.
