= Julie Pelipas =

Ukrainian stylist and fashion director (born 1984)

- Юлія Пеліпас
- Born: Julie Pelipas; 16 July 1984 (age 41); Zhdanov, Donetsk Oblast, Ukrainian SSR, Soviet Union
- Citizenship: Ukraine
- Education: Taras Shevchenko National University of Kyiv
- Occupations: stylist, director
- Style: minimalism
- Children: Penelope Pelipas, Peter Pelipas
- Awards: Best Fashion Awards.
- Website: http://www.juliepelipas.co

Julie Pelipas (Ukrainian: Юлія Пеліпас; 16 July 1984) is a Ukrainian stylist and fashion director. She is the fashion director of Vogue Ukraine and an ambassador of No More Plastic Foundation.

== Biography ==
Pelipas was born in Zhdanov, Ukrainian SSR, USSR (now Mariupol, Ukraine). She graduated from Taras Shevchenko National University of Kyiv.

In 2002, Pelipas' career began as a journalist on the Ukrainian TV channel INTER, where she worked for 4 years. In 2004, Pelipas worked on the project “Miss CIS” on the Ukrainian TV channel TET as a television presenter and stylist. Later, Pelipas became a fashion producer of special projects of Harper's Bazaar. She has worked as a stylist with such fashion magazines of Ukraine as L'Officiel and Harper's Bazaar.

Throughout her career in the fashion industry, Julie Pelipas has collaborated with such magazines as Vogue Ukraine, Vogue Paris, Vogue Poland, Harper’s Bazaar Ukraine, L'Officiel Ukraine, InStyle US and various fashion brands all over the world.

Since 2013, Pelipas is fashion director in Vogue Ukraine, being a part of team, who were launching the magazine from a scratch.

Julie is also engaged in consulting for numerous brands, such as Pangaia, Ochi, Bevza, Do Do Bar Or etc.

In January 2019, Pelipas became the ambassador of No More Plastic Foundation. In March 2019, Pelipas supported the information campaign #DrawYourValues, a communication project of The Babyn Yar Holocaust Memorial Center (BYHMC).

Since January 2020, Julie Pelipas is International Contrubuting Fashion Director In Vogue Ukraine.
