= Transformer (film) =

- Directed by: Michael Del Monte
- Written by: Michael Del Monte; Samuel Fussell
- Produced by: Tad Munnings
- Starring: Janae Kroc
- Cinematography: Brian Hunt
- Edited by: Graham Withers
- Music by: Gilad Carroll
- Production company: Storystream Creative
- Distributed by: Documentary Channel; Gravitas Ventures
- Release date: October 28, 2017 (Austin)
- Running time: 78 minutes
- Country: Canada
- Language: English

Transformer is a 2017 Canadian documentary film directed by Michael Del Monte, featuring competitive bodybuilder Janae Kroc coping with both the physical and social processes of gender transition after coming out as a trans woman.

== Release and awards ==
The film premiered at the 2017 Austin Film Festival, where it won the audience prize and feature documentary award. It subsequently screened at the 2018 Hot Docs Canadian International Documentary Festival, where it won both Audience Award categories, the juried award for Best Canadian Feature Documentary and the Emerging Canadian Filmmaker Award, then at the 2018 Queer North Film Festival, where it won the audience award for best transgender film.

The film was distributed in Canada primarily as a television film on the Canadian Broadcasting Corporation's Documentary Channel, with international theatrical distribution by Gravitas Ventures.

Graham Withers received a Canadian Screen Award nomination for Best Editing in a Documentary at the 7th Canadian Screen Awards.
