= Imran Amed =

Canadian-British entrepreneur and fashion expert

Imran Amed MBE
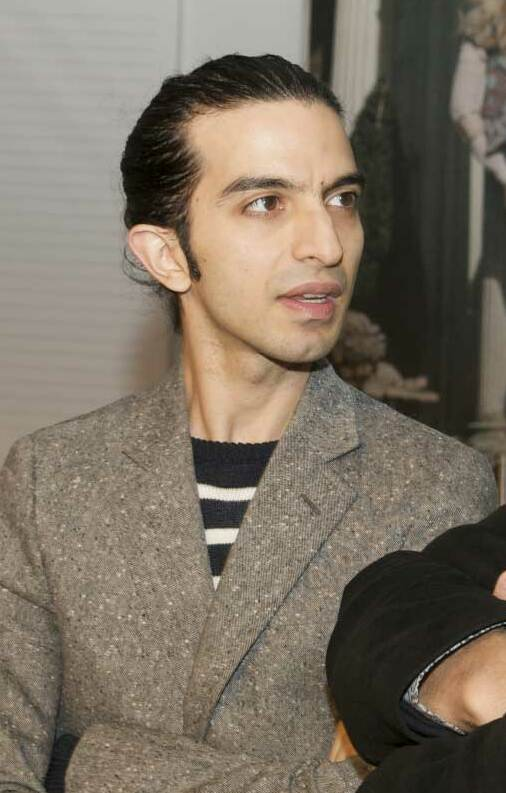
- Amed in 2010
- Born: April 20, 1975 (age 51); Calgary, Alberta, Canada
- Education: McGill University; Harvard University
- Occupation: Entrepreneur
- Known for: Founding The Business of Fashion website
- Partner: Nikhil Mansata

Imran Amed MBE (born April 20, 1975) is a Canadian-British fashion media entrepreneur. He is the founder and editor-in-chief of the website The Business of Fashion.

== Early life ==
Amed was born and raised in Calgary, Alberta. He is of Indian descent. Amed attended McGill University in Montreal, Quebec. In 2000, he enrolled at Harvard Business School to complete an MBA.

== Career ==
Upon graduation from Harvard in 2002, Amed moved to London to work for McKinsey & Company, a global management consulting firm. He left McKinsey in 2006 to explore his interest in the fashion industry.

In 2011, Amed launched a bag design collaboration with British leather goods designer Bill Amberg.

=== The Business of Fashion ===
Amed is the founder of The Business of Fashion (BoF), a fashion news website. He launched it as a blog from his flat in Notting Hill in 2007.

In 2013, Amed raised $2.5 million in seed financing. BoF launched in China in 2014; Vanity Fair described it as the "only fashion-industry publication of its kind in the country."

In 2015, BoF had 30 employees, which expanded to 80 by 2018 at offices in London, New York and Shanghai. As of 2024, the company had 100 employees.

In October 2016, BoF launched a subscription for full access to its content. In 2018, The Observer reported that while some of BoF's content was original, the rest was aggregated from publications such as Vogue, The New York Times and Chinese newspapers.

As of 2024, BoF had over 100,000 subscribers located in over 130 countries. The Columbia Journalism Review described BoF as "a publication that is part trade reporting, part networking, for the industry professional who reads financial reports more than the enthusiast who follows Vogue covers".

== Personal life ==
Amed is in a relationship with Nikhil Mansata, a creative director and stylist.

== Awards and honors ==
In 2016, at the Council of Fashion Designers of America Awards, Amed was awarded the Media Award in Honor of Eugenia Sheppard.

He was an appointed Member of the Order of the British Empire (MBE) in the 2017 New Year Honours for services to fashion.

In 2018, he was awarded an Honorary Doctorate by Central Saint Martins at the University of the Arts London.

== Books ==
- Pattern, Phaidon, 2013 (ISBN 0714849723; ISBN 978-0714849720)
