= The Grab =

- Directed by: Gabriela Cowperthwaite
- Produced by: Gabriela Cowperthwaite; Blye Pagon Faust; Amanda Pike; Nicole Rocklin; Nathan Halverson
- Cinematography: Jonathan Ingalls
- Edited by: Davis Coombe
- Music by: Jeff Beal
- Production companies: Impact Partners; Center for Investigative Reporting Studios; Rocklin/Faust
- Distributed by: Magnolia Pictures; Participant
- Release dates: September 8, 2022 (TIFF); June 14, 2024
- Running time: 104 minutes
- Country: United States
- Language: English
- Box office: $11,652

The Grab is a 2022 American documentary film directed and produced by Gabriela Cowperthwaite. It follows investigative journalists at The Center for Investigative Reporting as they uncover efforts to control food and water resources. The film premiered at the 2022 Toronto International Film Festival on September 8, 2022, and was released on June 14, 2024, by Magnolia Pictures and Participant.

== Plot ==
The film follows investigative journalists at The Center for Investigative Reporting as they uncover efforts by sovereign powers, private finance, and mercenary groups to take control over global food and water supplies in preparation for potential production collapses due to climate change.

The film outlines how several nation states and other actors use force, economics, and illegal mercenaries to take control of food and water stocks. The narrative begins with the 2014 purchase of US-based Smithfield Foods by Chinese WH Group, which the filmmakers say gave WH Group ownership of over a quarter of all pigs in the US. It then follows other hard-to-explain deals, such as the purchase of arid land in Arizona by a Saudi-based company, Russians hiring American cowboys to work in a region too cold for farmland, and Blackwater deals to secure land in Africa. They "follow the money" behind these strange commercial arrangements and identify connections between governments, commercial enterprises and legal and illegal military actors such as mercenary companies. The filmmakers ultimately draw the conclusion these actions are all part of separate efforts by these groups to position themselves to take advantage of collapses in food and water production due to the effects of climate change such as increased severe weather and drought.

While the film is mostly archive and research image collages, it also contains some guerrilla film making, such as of the crew being denied access and detained at a Zambian airport.

== Production ==
Gabriela Cowperthwaite spent six years working on the film, after journalist Nathan Halverson reported on Smithfield Foods. Cowperthwaite was initially asked if the investigative process behind Halverson's articles would make a good film. Due to the sensitive material of the subject, the production team did diagnostics on computers, not talking in rooms with windows, and not talking about the film at all. They also used encrypted servers and hand-delivered all footage.

== Release ==
The film had its world premiere at the 2022 Toronto International Film Festival on September 8, 2022. It also screened at DOC NYC on November 13, 2022. In March 2024, Magnolia Pictures and Participant acquired distribution rights to the film, and set it for a June 14, 2024, release.

== Reception ==
=== Critical response ===
On the review aggregator website Rotten Tomatoes, 85% of 27 critics' reviews are positive, with an average rating of 6.8/10. Metacritic, which uses a weighted average, assigned the film a score of 60 out of 100, based on 7 critics, indicating "mixed or average" reviews.

=== Accolades ===
In 2023, the film won the Best Documentary award at the San Diego International Film Festival.
