= Phesama =

- Village
- Interactive map of Phesama
- Location of Phesama Village Phesama (India)
- Coordinates: 25.629248°N 94.115690°E
- Country: India
- Region: Northeast India
- State: Nagaland
- District: Kohima District

Government
  - Type: Village Council
  - Body: Phesama Village Council

Population (2011)
  - Total: 3,061
- Time zone: UTC+5:30 (IST)
- PIN: 797120
- Vehicle registration: NL-01
- Sex ratio: 1026 females per 1000 males ♂/♀

Phesama is an Angami Naga village in the Kohima District of the Indian state of Nagaland. It is situated 8 km south of Kohima, the state capital.

== Location ==
Phesama is part of the one of the seven villages under the Jakhama administrative circle of Kohima district, which forms the Southern Angami region of Nagaland.

Phesama, along with Kigwema, lend their names to form the portmanteau name for Kisama Heritage Village as the cultural village was established and commissioned on the traditional lands of these villages.

== Demographics ==
According to the 2011 Census of India, Phesama had a population of 3061 people living in 749 households. The population consisted of 1511 males and 1550 females.

== Institutions ==
The Government Middle School in the village completed its centenary in 2019. Started in 1919 by Kruzolie Nakhro, a government teacher appointed to the task, he was the sole teacher until 1935. School education here was disrupted during the years of the Second World War when the area was in the midst of the Battle of Kohima.
