= Theja Rio =

Indian Naga-language film director

- Rio at the 2026 Toronto International Film Festival
- Born: Thejavituo Rio; 10 January 1995 (age 31); Kohima, Nagaland, India
- Education: National Film and Television School
- Occupations: Film director, screenwriter
- Years active: 2015–present
- Works: Angh (2026)
- Relatives: Neiphiu Rio (uncle); Zhaleo Rio (uncle)
- Website: thejario.com

Thejavituo Rio (born 10 January 1995) is an Indian film director and screenwriter from Nagaland. He is best known for his debut feature film Angh, which won the Platform Prize at the 2026 Toronto International Film Festival.

== Early life and education ==
Thejavituo Rio was born on 10 January 1995 in Kohima to an Angami Naga family from Tuophema, where he also did his schooling. His father, Medozeu Jimmy Rio is the younger brother of Neiphiu Rio, the current Chief Minister of Nagaland. Following the death of his elder brother when Rio was six year old, he spent much of his childhood alone and turned to storytelling. This interest developed into writing songs and rap lyrics, later progressing to short stories and screenplays.

He earned a bachelor's degree in English literature from the University of Delhi. In 2015, producer Nancy Nisa Beso introduced him to a filmmaking workshop in Sicily, which helped him experience working alongside professional filmmakers. This eventually led to him enrolling at the National Film and Television School, UK in 2022. He completed a master's degree in Directing Fiction in 2024.

== Career ==
In 2018, he received the Best Screenplay award at the Delhi Shorts International Film Festival for his short film Checkpost.

In 2021, Rio's short-film version of Angh received a special mention in the international competition at the Clermont-Ferrand International Short Film Festival. Thereafter, encouraged by its reception, he developed it into a feature-length adaptation, marking feature-debut with Angh. The film had its world premiere in the Platform section of the 2026 Toronto International Film Festival on 15 September 2026, where it won the Platform Prize.

== Personal life ==
Rio is in a relationship with model and actress Andrea Kevichüsa.

== Filmography ==
=== Short films ===
Year	Title	Credited as			Note
Year	Title	Director	Writer	Producer	Note
2015	Dissociate	Yes	Yes	Yes	
2016	Madam Khurana's Basket	Yes	Yes	No	
2018	Checkpost	Yes	Yes	Yes	
2021	Angh	Yes	Yes	Yes	
2023	Ade (On a Sunday)	Yes	Yes	Yes	

=== Feature films ===
Year	Title	Credited as			Note
Year	Title	Director	Writer	Producer	Note
2026	Angh	Yes	Yes	Yes	
