= Platform Prize =

Canadian film award

- Awarded for: To the films of high artistic merit that also demonstrate a strong directorial vision
- Description: The winner of the Platform Prize receives $25,000.
- Sponsored by: Air France
- Country: Canada
- Presented by: Toronto International Film Festival
- First award: 2015
- 2026 winner: Angh

The Platform Prize is an annual film award, presented by the Toronto International Film Festival to films of "high artistic merit that also demonstrate a strong directorial vision". Introduced in 2015, the award is presented to a film, selected by an international jury of three prominent filmmakers or actors, from among the films screened in the Platform program.

The award is named after Chinese filmmaker Jia Zhangke's historical drama feature film Platform (2000).

== History ==
According to festival programmer Cameron Bailey, the Platform program and prize were established because "films are passing through the festival without the attention they deserve". He compared Platform's intentions to the Cannes Film Festival's Directors' Fortnight and Un Certain Regard streams rather than its Palme d'Or award, indicating that it was meant to provide a platform for distinctive or innovative films but not to supplant the People's Choice Award as the top award at the festival.

The program normally screens between eight and twelve films; only one winner is selected each year, although as with TIFF's other juried awards the jurors have the discretion to give honorable mentions to other films besides the overall winner. In 2024, the jury for the first time chose to give out a special honorable mention to an individual performer in one of the Platform films.

The winner of the Platform Prize receives $25,000 from the award's current corporate sponsor, Air France. After the award is announced, the festival offers a repeat screening of the winner at the TIFF Lightbox on the final day of the festival.

From 2026, the non-English language winners will also be automatically eligible for the Academy Award for Best International Feature Film. With the announcement, TIFF expanded the program to 12 films from the 10 of recent years, and expanded the award jury from three to five members; according to TIFF programming officer Anita Lee, “We want to position these as emerging international films and filmmakers you should have on your radar.”

== Critical response ==
In some years, the film magazine Screen International has convened its own unofficial panel of film critics, who were assigned to watch all the Platform films and conduct their own independent vote on which film should win the award. Their panel in 2017 selected Warwick Thornton's Sweet Country, the same film that won the prize, but their panel in 2018 split between two films, Benjamín Naishtat's Rojo and Emir Baigazin's The River, while the festival jury awarded the prize to Ho Wi Ding's Cities of Last Things; the jury did, however, give The River an honorable mention.

Other critics have questioned whether the Platform Prize has been effective at accomplishing its stated goals at all. Canadian documentary filmmaker Alan Zweig, who won the inaugural Platform Prize in 2015 for his film Hurt, noted that while it was not the least successful film of his career in general release, the prize did not appear to give the film any major boost in distribution or box office sales over his other films. The 2016 jury's choice of Pablo Larraín's Jackie has also been questioned by critics, in particular because the Platform lineup that year also included Moonlight, which went on to win the Academy Award for Best Picture.

== Competition ==
† denotes a non-winning film which received an honorable mention from the jury.

=== 2010s ===
Year	English Title	Original Title	Director	Ref.
2015	Hurt		Alan Zweig	
2015	Bang Gang (A Modern Love Story)	Bang Gang (une histoire d'amour moderne)	Eva Husson	
2015	The Clan	El clan	Pablo Trapero	
2015	French Blood	Un Français	Diastème	
2015	Full Contact		David Verbeek	
2015	High-Rise		Ben Wheatley	
2015	Land of Mine	Under sandet	Martin Zandvliet	
2015	Looking for Grace		Sue Brooks	
2015	Neon Bull	Boi neon	Gabriel Mascaro	
2015	The Promised Land	回到被爱的每一天	He Ping	
2015	Sky		Fabienne Berthaud	
2015	The White Knights	Les Chevaliers Blancs	Joachim Lafosse	
2016	Jackie		Pablo Larraín	
2016	Daguerrotype	Le Secret de la chambre noire	Kiyoshi Kurosawa	
2016	Goldstone		Ivan Sen	
2016	Heal the Living	Réparer les vivants	Katell Quillévéré	
2016	Hema Hema †	ཧེ་མ་ཧེ་མ།	Khyentse Norbu	
2016	Home		Fien Troch	
2016	Lady Macbeth		William Oldroyd	
2016	Layla M.		Mijke de Jong	
2016	Searchers	ᒪᓕᒡᓗᑎᑦ	Zacharias Kunuk and Natar Ungalaaq	
2016	Moonlight		Barry Jenkins	
2016	Nocturama		Bertrand Bonello	
2016	Those Who Make Revolution Halfway Only Dig Their Own Graves	Ceux qui font les révolutions à moitié n'ont fait que se creuser un tombeau	Mathieu Denis and Simon Lavoie	
2017	Sweet Country		Warwick Thornton	
2017	Beast		Michael Pearce	
2017	Brad's Status		Mike White	
2017	Custody	Jusqu'à la garde	Xavier Legrand	
2017	Dark River		Clio Barnard	
2017	The Death of Stalin		Armando Iannucci	
2017	Euphoria		Lisa Langseth	
2017	If You Saw His Heart	Si tu voyais son cœur	Joan Chemla	
2017	Mademoiselle Paradis	Licht	Barbara Albert	
2017	Razzia	غزية	Nabil Ayouch	
2017	The Seen and Unseen	Sekala Niskala	Kamila Andini	
2017	What Will People Say	Hva vil folk si	Iram Haq	
2018	Cities of Last Things	幸福城市	Ho Wi-ding	
2018	Angelo		Markus Schleinzer	
2018	Destroyer		Karyn Kusama	
2018	Donnybrook		Tim Sutton	
2018	The Good Girls	Las niñas bien	Alejandra Márquez Abella	
2018	Her Smell		Alex Ross Perry	
2018	The Innocent	Der Unschuldige	Simon Jaquemet	
2018	Jessica Forever		Caroline Poggi and Jonathan Vinel	
2018	Lady J	Mademoiselle de Joncquières	Emmanuel Mouret	
2018	Out of Blue		Carol Morley	
2018	The River †	Өзен	Emir Baigazin	
2018	Rojo		Benjamín Naishtat	
2019	Martin Eden		Pietro Marcello	
2019	Anne at 13,000 Ft. †		Kazik Radwanski	
2019	The Moneychanger	Así habló el cambista	Federico Veiroj	
2019	My Zoe		Julie Delpy	
2019	Proxima †		Alice Winocour	
2019	Rocks		Sarah Gavron	
2019	The Sleepwalkers	Los sonámbulos	Paula Hernández	
2019	Sound of Metal		Darius Marder	
2019	Wet Season	热带雨	Anthony Chen	
2019	Workforce	Mano de obra	David Zonana	

=== 2020s ===
Year	English Title	Original Title	Director	Ref.
2020	Award not presented, due to the reduced program in light of the COVID-19 pandemic in Canada.			
2021	Yuni		Kamila Andini	
2021	Arthur Rambo		Laurent Cantet	
2021	Drunken Birds	Les oiseaux ivres	Ivan Grbovic	
2021	Earwig		Lucile Hadžihalilović	
2021	Good Madam †	Mlungu Wam	Jenna Cato Bass	
2021	Huda's Salon	صالون هدى	Hany Abu-Assad	
2021	Montana Story		Scott McGehee and David Siegel	
2021	Silent Land	Cicha ziemia	Aga Woszczyńska	
2022	Riceboy Sleeps		Anthony Shim	
2022	Charcoal	Carvão	Carolina Markowicz	
2022	Emily		Frances O'Connor	
2022	The Gravity	La Gravité	Cédric Ido	
2022	Hawa		Maïmouna Doucouré	
2022	How to Blow Up a Pipeline		Daniel Goldhaber	
2022	Subtraction	تفریق	Mani Haghighi	
2022	Thunder	Foudre	Carmen Jaquier	
2022	Tora's Husband		Rima Das	
2022	Viking		Stéphane Lafleur	
2023	Dear Jassi		Tarsem Singh Dhandwar	
2023	Dream Scenario		Kristoffer Borgli	
2023	Great Absence	大いなる不在	Kei Chikaura	
2023	I Told You So	Te l'avevo detto	Ginevra Elkann	
2023	The King Tide		Christian Sparkes	
2023	Not a Word	Kein Wort	Hanna Slak	
2023	The Rye Horn	O Corno	Jaione Camborda	
2023	Sisterhood	HLM Pussy	Nora El Hourch	
2023	Shame on Dry Land	Syndabocken	Axel Petersén	
2023	Spirit of Ecstasy	La Vénus d'argent	Héléna Klotz	
2024	They Will Be Dust	Polvo serán	Carlos Marqués-Marcet	
2024	Daniela Forever		Nacho Vigalondo	
2024	Daughter's Daughter † to Sylvia Chang for her performance	女兒的女兒	Huang Xi	
2024	Mr. K		Tallulah H. Schwab	
2024	Paying for It		Sook-Yin Lee	
2024	Pedro Páramo		Rodrigo Prieto	
2024	Triumph	Триумф	Petar Valchanov and Kristina Grozeva	
2024	Viktor	Віктор	Olivier Sarbil	
2024	Winter in Sokcho	Hiver à Sokcho	Koya Kamura	
2024	The Wolves Always Come at Night		Gabrielle Brady	
2025	To the Victory!	За Перемогу!	Valentyn Vasyanovych	
2025	At the Place of Ghosts	Sk+te’kmujue’katik	Bretten Hannam	
2025	Between Dreams and Hope	Mian roya va omid	Farnoosh Samadi	
2025	Bouchra		Orian Barki and Meriem Bennani	
2025	The Currents	Las Corrientes	Milagros Mumenthaler	
2025	Hen †	Κότα	György Pálfi	
2025	Nino		Pauline Loquès	
2025	Steve		Tim Mielants	
2025	Winter of the Crow		Kasia Adamik	
2025	The World of Love	세계의 주인	Yoon Ga-eun	
2026	Angh		Theja Rio	
2026	Brace Your Heart †	Garrat du váimmu	Amanda Kernell	
2026	Children Untold	わたしの知らない子どもたち	Miwa Nishikawa	
2026	Djinn Wedding	Cinlerin Düğünü	Ferit Karahan	
2026	Idda		Irene Dionisio	
2026	In the Heart of the South		Nyla Innuksuk	
2026	Masc		Bertil Nilsson	
2026	On Behalf of My Son	Vicentina Pede Desculpas	Gabriel Martins	
2026	Silenced Nights		Lawrence Fajardo	
2026	The Smell of Apples	Die Reuk van Appels	John Trengove	
2026	Wild, Wild East	Dziki, dziki wschód	Jan Holoubek	
2026	The World Before	첫세계	Yoon Dan-bi	

== Juries ==
Year	Jury	Ref.
2015	Jia Zhangke, Claire Denis, Agnieszka Holland	
2016	Brian de Palma, Mahamat-Saleh Haroun, Zhang Ziyi	
2017	Chen Kaige, Małgorzata Szumowska, Wim Wenders	
2018	Lee Chang-dong, Béla Tarr, Mira Nair	
2019	Carlo Chatrian, Jessica Kiang, Athina Rachel Tsangari	
2021	Riz Ahmed, Clio Barnard, Anthony Chen, Valerie Complex, Kazik Radwanski	
2022	Patricia Rozema, Iram Haq, Chaitanya Tamhane	
2023	Barry Jenkins, Nadine Labaki, Anthony Shim	
2024	Atom Egoyan, Hur Jin-ho, Jane Schoenbrun	
2025	Carlos Marqués-Marcet, Chloé Robichaud, Marianne Jean-Baptiste	
2026	Pablo Trapero, Amma Asante, Sylvia Chang, Luc Déry, Albert Lee	
