= Afsaneh Salari =

Iranian documentary filmmaker, editor and producer

- افسانه سالاری
- Born: 8 November 1988 (age 37); Tehran, Iran
- Occupations: documentary filmmaker, editor and producer
- Years active: 2015–present

Afsaneh Salari (Persian: افسانه سالاری; born 8 November 1988) is an Iranian documentary filmmaker, editor, and producer. She is known for directing The Silhouettes and producing The Forbidden Strings. In June 24 2026, Salari was invited to join the Academy of Motion Picture Arts and Sciences, which presents the Oscars.

The Silhouettes earned a Jury Special Mention for Best Documentary Feature at Visions du Réel, won the Next Award Prize at the DMZ International Documentary Film Festival in 2021, and received the Director's Choice of Young Talent award at the Iranian Film Festival Zurich. The Silhouettes also received a nomination for Best Documentary Feature at the 39th Fajr Film Festival.

Salari's documentary Great Are the Eyes of a Dead Father features Wim Wenders as a Creative Consultant. This project is part of the "A Sense of Place" initiative in collaboration with the Wim Wenders Foundation.

She also recently contributed as a producer to the documentary film A Sisters' Tale (2024), directed by Leila Amini. The film, which tells the story of a woman's struggle for self-expression in Iran, was produced in collaboration with several international production companies and supported by Swiss and French film funds.

Afsaneh Salari is the delegate producer of A Sisters' Tale through her company Docmaniacs in France. The film premiered at the Semaine de la Critique de Locarno Film Festival 2024, celebrated its North American premiere at the Toronto International Film Festival (TIFF) in Canada, and had its Dutch premiere at the IDFA Film Festival in the Best of the Fests section.

As an editor, Afsaneh has edited several award-winning feature-length documentaries, including An Owl, a Garden and a Writer and The Future Cries Beneath Our Soil. Writing Hawa | حوا is her latest film as editor and co-author, co-produced by Arte France and set to celebrate its World Premiere at the International Competition of International Documentary Film Festival Amsterdam (IDFA) in 2024. The film is supported by Sundance Documentary Grant and Doha Film Fund among many others.

Salari holds a BA in film editing from the Tehran University of Art, a Master's degree in Creative Directing and Cinematography from the University of Paris 8, and a Master's in Documentary Directing from the DocNomads joint master's program.

She co-founded the Docmaniacs Film Collective in Tehran and established Docmaniacs Productions in Paris. Salari is also an alumna of the La Fémis documentary course, Berlinale Talents, and the IDFA Academy.

== Filmography ==
=== Director ===
Feature Documentary

Year	Title	Ref.
2020	The Silhouettes | خانه	

Short Documentary

Year	Title	Ref.
2023	Great are the eyes of a dead father | چشم‌های بیدار پدر مرده in collaboration with Wim Wenders Foundation in the collective project « A sense of place »	
2016	No Man’s Land	
2015	Conversion: a guide of the skin allergy treatment	
2013	The Room	
2011	Madame Servante	

=== Editor ===
Documentary

Year	Title	Ref.
2024	Writing Hawa	
2023	Great are the eyes of a dead father	
2023	A Band of Dreamers and a Judge	
2023	An owl, a garden and the writer	
2018	The Future Cries Beneath our Soil	

Television

Year	Title	Ref.
2021	Happiness	

=== Producer ===
Feature Documentary

Year	Title	Ref.
2024	A Sisters’ Tale | خواهر	
2020	The Silhouettes | خانه	
2019	The Forbidden Strings | تارهای ممنوعه	
