= Ere Gowda =

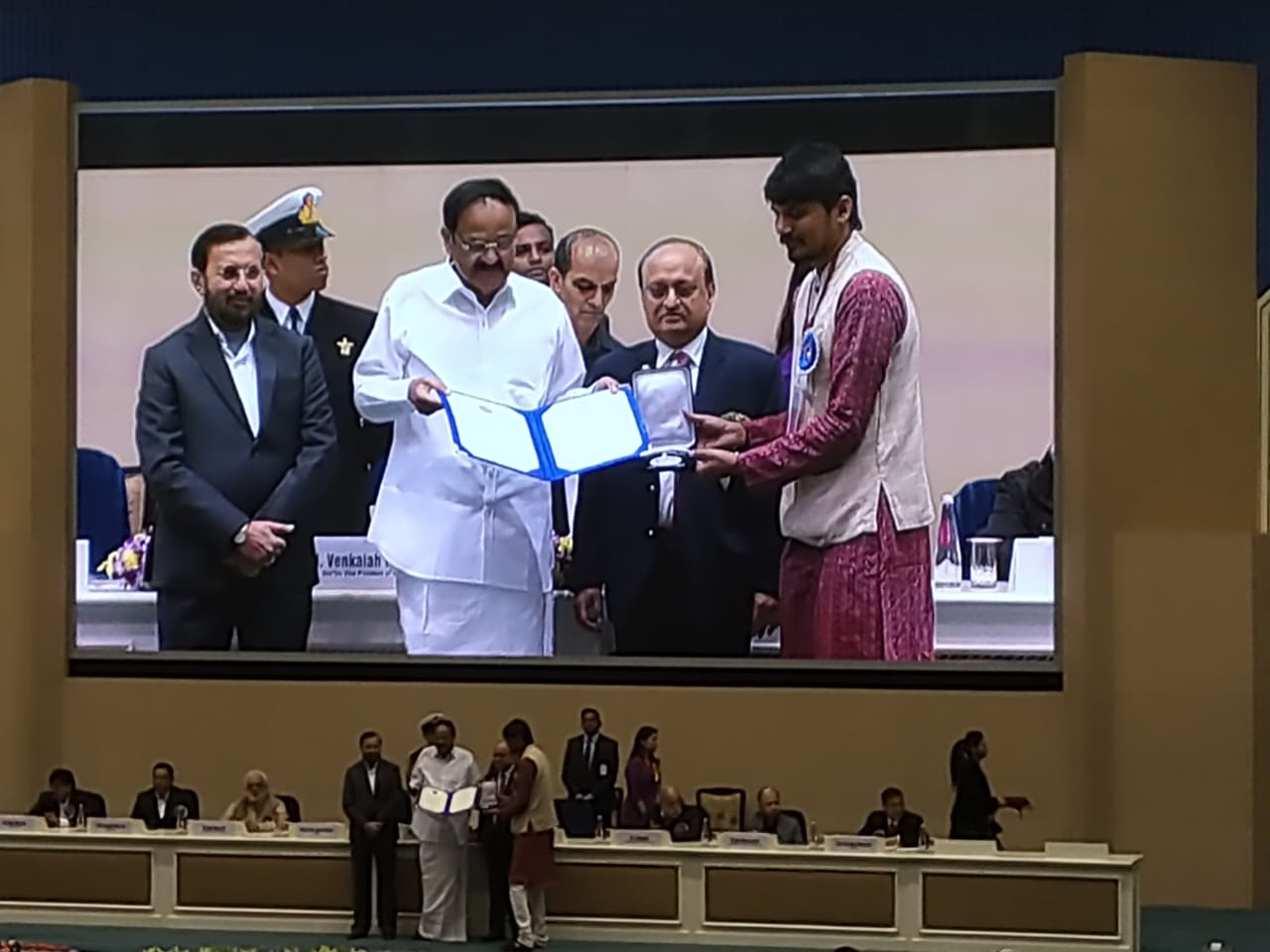
- Ere Gowda receiving the award for Best Educational Film in the non fiction category for his film Sarala Virala from the Vice President Venkaiah Naidu in 2018
- Born: Mandya, Karnataka, India
- Occupation: Film maker
- Years active: 2010–present

Ere Gowda (Kannada: ಈರೇಗೌಡ) is a Kannada film director known for his award-winning Kannada movie Balekempa. He was also the screenwriter of the award-winning Kannada film Thithi directed by Raam Reddy.

He is also a motivational speaker. and has given talks at INK talks and several international conferences. His film Balekempa was listed under the ten most notable films at IFFR.

== Early career ==
Ere Gowda worked as a security guard in Mysore after finishing his schooling due to family financial problems. Later he moved to Bangalore, where he worked under Anita Reddy, a well known social worker. After finding that Gowda was interested in photography and camera work, Anita Reddy gave him a chance to document the activities of several nonprofit organizations around Bangalore. Gowda's dedication and interest in film making gave him a chance to work in several short films with her son Raam Reddy.

== Filmmaking career ==
In 2015 when Raam Reddy completed his film studies at Prague Film School, they worked together to make the film Thithi. In 2017 Gowda wrote and directed his next Kannada movie Balekempa. The film has won several awards and is expected to be in theaters in 2019.

== Films and awards ==
Year	Title	Credit	Year	Country	Film Festival	Category	Award
2019	Sarala Virala	Writer / Director	2019	India	66th National Film Awards	Best Educational Film	Won
2019	Sarala Virala	Writer / Director	2019	India	Bangalore International Film Festival		
2018	Balekempa (The Bangle Seller)	Writer / Director	2018	India	Dharamshala International Film Festival	Closing Film	
2018	Balekempa (The Bangle Seller)	Writer / Director	2018	India	Mumbai Academy of the Moving Image	Indiagold	
2018	Balekempa (The Bangle Seller)	Writer / Director	2018	Japan	Fukuoka International Film Festival		
2018	Balekempa (The Bangle Seller)	Writer / Director	2018	Poland	Transatlantyk Festival	New Cinema	
2018	Balekempa (The Bangle Seller)	Writer / Director	2018	Australia	Asia Pacific Screen Awards	Achievement in Cinematography	Nominated
2018	Balekempa (The Bangle Seller)	Writer / Director	2018	Australia	Indian Film Festival of Melbourne		Nominated
2018	Balekempa (The Bangle Seller)	Writer / Director	2018	South Korea	Jeonju International Film Festival	World Cinemascape	
2018	Balekempa (The Bangle Seller)	Writer / Director	2018	South Korea	Las Palmas de Gran Canaria International Film Festival		
2018	Balekempa (The Bangle Seller)	Writer / Director	2018	Canada	International Film Festival of South Asia, Toronto		
2018	Balekempa (The Bangle Seller)	Writer / Director	2018	UK	East End Film Festival		
2018	Balekempa (The Bangle Seller)	Writer / Director	2018	USA	New York Indian Film Festival	Best Film	Nominated
2018	Balekempa (The Bangle Seller)	Writer / Director	2018	USA	New York Indian Film Festival	Best Director	Nominated
2018	Balekempa (The Bangle Seller)	Writer / Director	2018	Netherlands	International Film Festival Rotterdam	Bright Future Competition (FIPRESCI)	Won
2018	Balekempa (The Bangle Seller)	Writer / Director	2017	India	NFDC Film Bazaar	Work in Progress Lab	Won
2015	Thithi	Casting Director / Scriptwriter	2015	India	Karnataka State Film Awards	Best Dialogue	Won
2015	Thithi	Casting Director / Scriptwriter	2015	China	19th Shanghai International Film Festival	Best Script Writer (Asian New Talent Award)	Won
2015	Thithi	Casting Director / Scriptwriter	2015		1st BRICS Film Festival	Best Film	Won
2012	Eka	Scriptwriter / Associate director					
