= Vivek Gomber =

Indian actor (born 1979)

- Born: 1979 (age 46–47); Jaipur, Rajasthan, India
- Occupations: Actor; producer
- Years active: 2002–present

Vivek Gomber is an Indian actor and producer who has made significant contributions to Indian, British, and American cinema. He is a recipient of a National Film Award along with multiple international awards.

He started with minor role in Hindi television daily soap Astitva...Ek Prem Kahani in 2002, Gomber steadily carved his path, making notable appearances in projects such as the acclaimed legal drama Court (2014) and the romantic drama Sir (2018), where he demonstrated his ability to portray complex characters with depth and nuance.

Not limited to acting, Gomber ventured into production and founded his production company, Zoo Entertainment Pvt Ltd, in 2014. He brought compelling narratives to life through films like Balekempa (2018) and The Disciple (2020) which garnered recognition and accolades on the global stage.

== Career ==
Gomber began his acting journey with a minor role in Zee TV's Hindi soap opera Astitva...Ek Prem Kahani (2002). He continued to make appearances in various projects, including the bilingual short film The Morning Fog in 2006, where he portrayed a weather guide, and the international film Exitz in the following year, albeit receiving negative reviews from both audiences and critics.

In 2008, he joined the cast of the British-Indian comedy series Mumbai Calling, helmed by Sanjeev Bhaskar, which was set in the fictional Teknobable call center located in Mumbai. Following this, Gomber played the role of a call center accent trainer in Kunaal Roy Kapur's English language satirical mockumentary film The President Is Coming in 2009. This film delved into the behind-the-scenes chaos surrounding President Bush's visit to India, receiving acclaim from critics. During this period, he also contributed to Vinod Mitra's drama film Meridian Lines, although the film is yet to be released.

His breakthrough came in 2014 with his portrayal of a Gujarati defense lawyer in Chaitanya Tamhane multi-lingual legal drama film, Court, alongside Vira Sathidar and Geetanjali Kulkarni. The film, which explores the intricacies of the Indian legal system through the trial of an aging protest singer accused of encouraging a manhole worker to commit suicide, earned him widespread recognition. Gomber also served as a producer for the film, a role offered to him by Tamhane. Court had its premier at the 71st Venice International Film Festival and was screened at numerous other prestigious international film festivals, including Auteur Film Festival Serbia, the Washington DC South Asian Film Festival, Minsk International Film Festival, Singapore International Film Festival, International Antalya Film Festival, BFI London Film Festival, Vienna International Film Festival and Buenos Aires International Festival of Independent Cinema. It was India's official submission for the 88th Academy Awards in the Best Foreign Language Film category, although it did not receive a nomination. Gomber's performance as Vinay was lauded, Suhani Singh of India Today noted, "Gomber demonstrates the frustrations and challenges of a helpless lawyer struggling to help his client and let truth win. His Vinay comes closest to voicing the audience's viewpoint of the case." The film received several awards, including Best Feature Film at the 62nd National Film Awards. In the same year, Gomber appeared in the American biographical drama The Letters, based on the life of Albanian-Indian Catholic nun Mother Teresa.

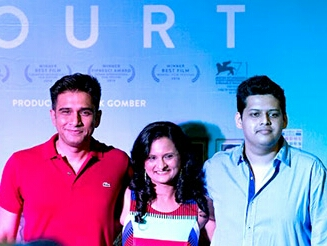
Gomber (left), Geetanjali Kulkarni (center) and Chaitanya Tamhane (right) at the trailer launch of their film Court in 2014.

In 2018, Gomber took on a leading role opposite Tillotama Shome in romantic drama film, Sir. He portrayed Ashwin, an architect who returns from the U.S. and finds himself disillusioned with his fiancée, gradually developing feelings for his maid. Premiering at the 2018 Cannes Film Festival, the movie later had theatrical releases across European countries. However, it wasn't until November 2020 that it hit screens in India. Alongside his acting endeavors, Gomber produced the Kannada drama film Balekempa, a poignant tale exploring the intricacies of a bangle seller's relationship with his wife. Garnering numerous nominations worldwide, the film earned the FIPRESCI Prize at the Rotterdam International Film Festival.

Next in 2020, he appeared in Mira Nair's British television drama A Suitable Boy, set against the backdrop of independent India. Critic Saibal Chatterjee of NDTV praised his portrayal, noting, "Gomber is delightfully on the ball as Arun Mehra" Also in 2020, he teamed up with Tamhane once again, this time as a producer for the Marathi drama film The Disciple. This film made history by entering the main competition section at the 77th Venice International Film Festival, marking the first Indian film since Monsoon Wedding (2001) to compete at the prestigious event. It went on to win the FIPRESCI International Critics Prize and received accolades at the Toronto International Film Festival, Independent Spirit Awards and Asian Film Awards. In 2021, Gomber reunited with Shahana Goswami in the Netflix series Bombay Begums.

In 2024, Gomber stepped into the main lead in Hansal Mehta's action crime drama series Lootere. The series revolves around the gripping narrative of a Ukrainian trading vessel under attack by Somali pirates on international waters. Gomber portrayed an illicit businessman of Indian origin, stationed at the Mogadishu port. Selected after six months of rigorous auditioning and look tests, Gomber's performance was highly acclaimed. Shubhra Gupta of The Indian Express praised his portrayal as entertaining, stating, "Gomber goes full-tilt camp at his Gandhi, yelling-shouting-chain-smoking," Ronak Kotecha of The Times of India hailed his character as the undisputed don of Somalia, adding, "Gomber stands out as Vikrant Gandhi - a recklessly confident character that is created with finesse and indulgence. This bad boy demands your attention and whether you like him or hate him, you cannot ignore him. That’s mainly because Gomber makes it his own."

== Filmography ==
Key
†	Denotes films that have not yet been released

=== Films ===
Year	Title	Role	Language	Notes	Ref.
2006	The Morning Fog	Raja	English	Short film	
2006	The Morning Fog	Raja	Hindi	Short film	
2007	Exitz	Indian Barman	English		
2009	The President Is Coming	Rohit Seth	English		
2013	Meridian Lines	Fredrico Dumukh	Hindi	Unreleased film	
2013	Glass Bottom Boat		English	Short film	
2014	The Letters	Ashwani Sharma	English		
2014	Court	Vinay Vora	Marathi	Also producer	
2014	Court	Vinay Vora	Hindi	Also producer	
2014	Court	Vinay Vora	English	Also producer	
2014	Court	Vinay Vora	Gujarati	Also producer	
2014	Leap of Faith	Sam	English	Short film	
2018	Sir	Ashvin	Hindi	Feature	
2024	Jigra	Hansraj Landa	Hindi	Feature	

=== Television ===
Year	Title	Role	Language	Notes	Ref.
2002	Astitva...Ek Prem Kahani	Harsh	Hindi		

=== Web series ===
Year	Title	Role	Language	Notes	Ref.
2008	Mumbai Calling	Lovely Singh	English		
2020	A Suitable Boy	Arun Mehra	Bengali		
2020	A Suitable Boy	Arun Mehra	English		
2020	A Suitable Boy	Arun Mehra	Hindi		
2020	A Suitable Boy	Arun Mehra	Urdu		
2021	Bombay Begums	Arijay Sinha	Hindi		
2024	Lootere	Vikrant Gandhi	Hindi		

=== Producer ===
Year	Title	Language	Notes	Ref.
2014	Court	Marathi		
2014	Court	Hindi		
2014	Court	English		
2014	Court	Gujarati		
2018	Balekempa (The Bangle Seller)	Kannada		
2020	The Disciple	Marathi		

=== Play ===
Year	Title	Role	Notes	Ref.
2023	Betrayal	Robert		
