= Khoobsurat =

Khoobsurat (lit. 'beautiful' in Hindi-Urdu) may refer to:

- Khubsoorat, a 1980 Indian Hindi-language romantic comedy film, starring Rekha
- Khoobsurat (1999 film), a 1999 Indian Hindi-language film, starring Sanjay Dutt and Urmila Matondkar
- Khoobsurat (2014 film), a 2014 Indian Hindi-language romantic comedy film by Shashanka Ghosh starring Sonam Kapoor, remake of the 1980 film
- Khoobsurat, a 2016 Pakistani television series that aired on Urdu 1

== See also ==
- Khubsurat Bala, a 1910 Urdu play by Agha Hashar Kashmiri
- Shahrukh Bola "Khoobsurat Hai Tu", a 2010 Indian Hindi-language drama film
