= Aditya Modak =

Indian classical singer and film actor (born 1988)

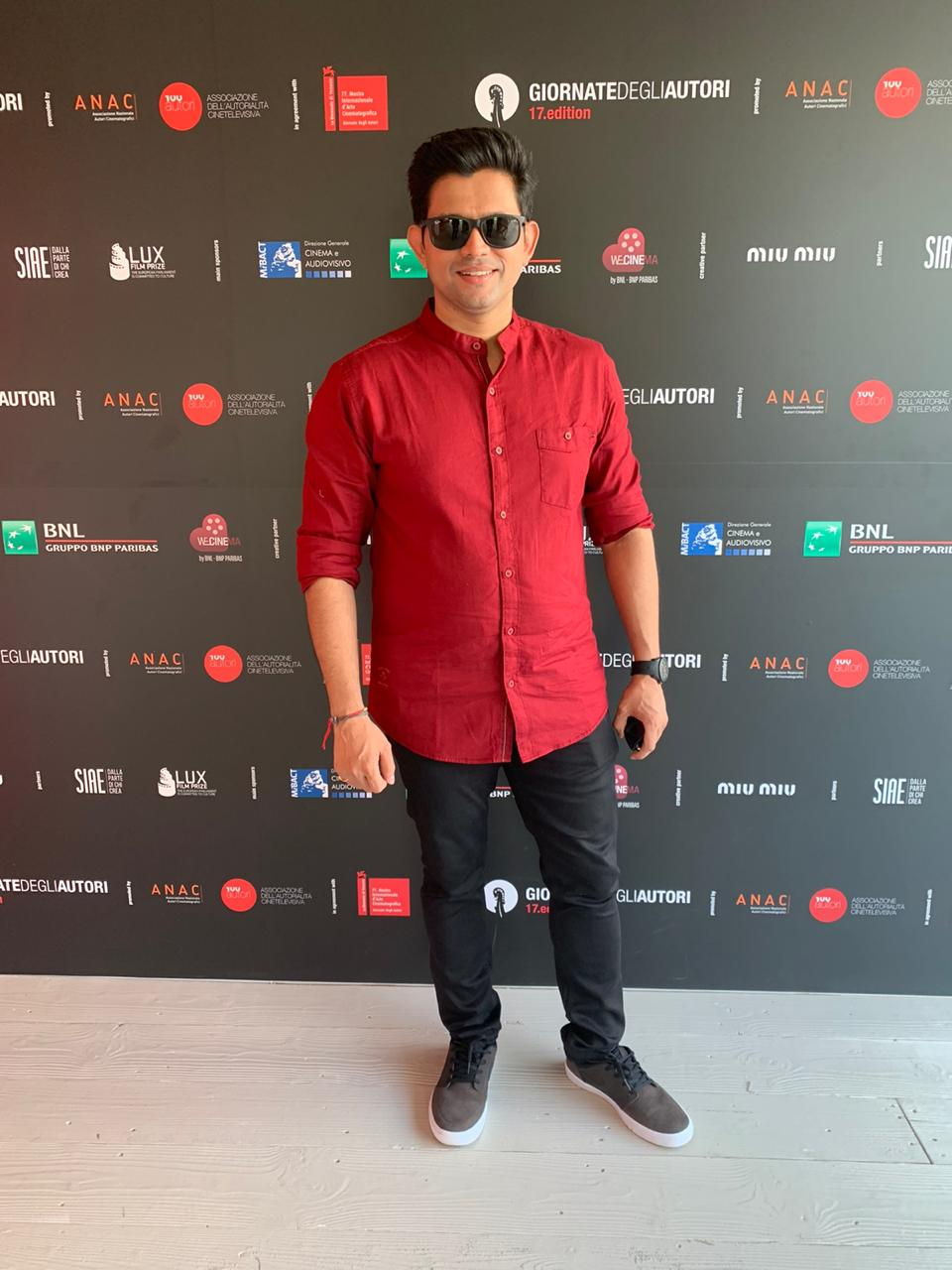
- Born: 28 October 1988 (age 37); Mumbai, Maharashtra, India
- Occupations: Singer, actor

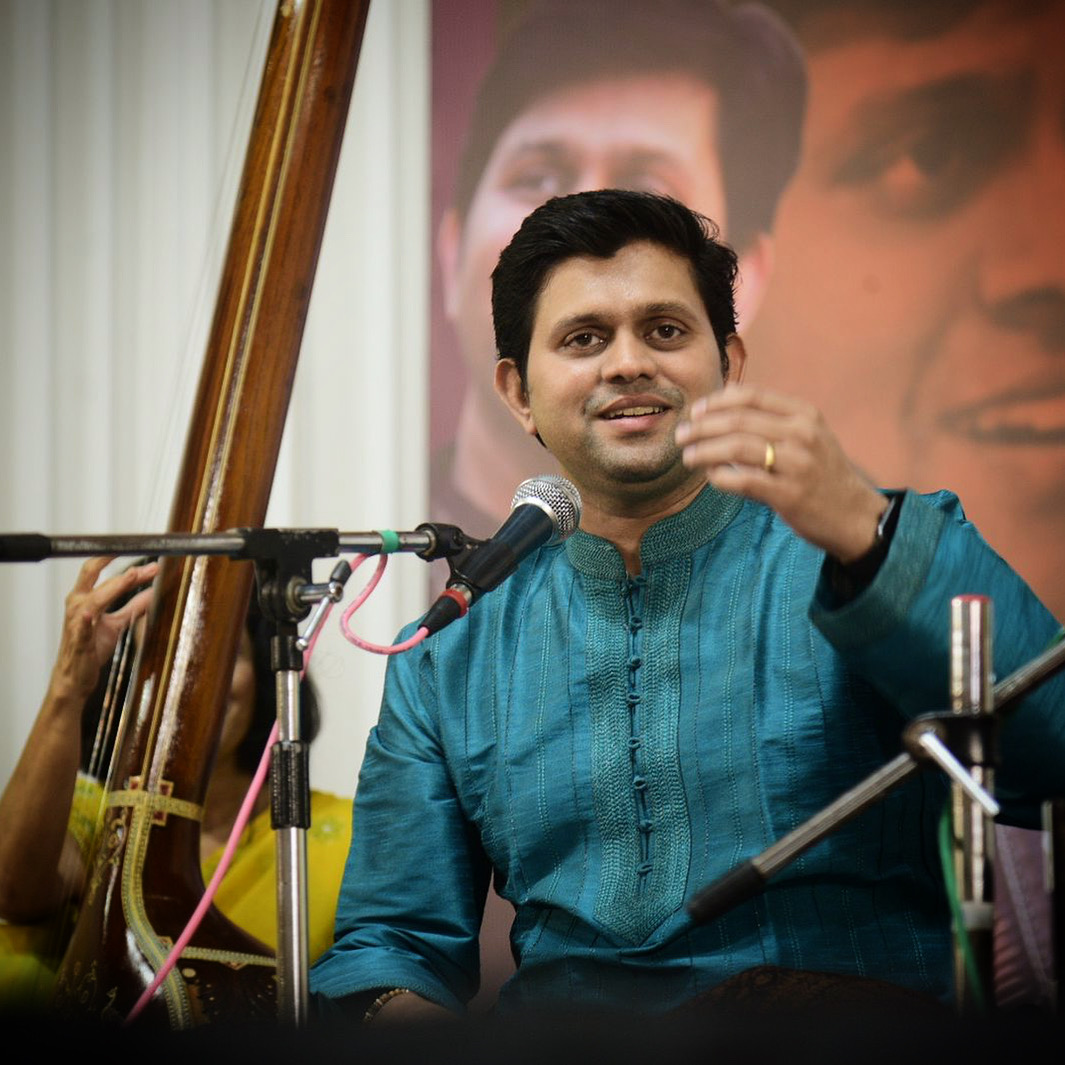
Aditya Modak performing in a concert in Maharashtra (Oct 2022)

Aditya Modak is a Hindustani classical music artiste and the lead actor of Chaitanya Tamhane's The Disciple, which premiered at the Venice International Film Festival and was later picked up by Netflix. Modak was entrusted with the role of the protagonist because Chaitanya preferred an experienced musician rather than a trainer actor. Critics of The New York Times and The Christian Science Monitor named Modak as one of their top choices for an Oscar nomination.

== Early life and education ==
A child prodigy, Modak was initiated into classical music under the tutelage of Pt. Chandrakant Parkar when he was 5 years old. He later became the disciple of Pt. Pradeep Dhond and then Pt. Ram Deshpande of the Gwalior Gharana. He received several music scholarships, including the National Scholarship awarded by the Government of India; the Sawai Gandharva Scholarship awarded by the Sawai Gandharva Association, Pune; and the Bhimsen Joshi Scholarship awarded by the University of Mumbai Additionally, he is a chartered accountant.

== Career ==
Modak performed at The Vedic Heritage, Hempstead, USA, organised by Pt. Jasraj, in addition to several other prestigious classical music conferences, events, and musical festivals, such as the Dr. Vasantrao Deshpande Samaroha, the Kashi Sangeet Mahotsav, the Dadar Matunga Cultural Centre, the National Centre for Performing Arts and the Gwalior Sangeet Samaroha. In 2010, he played the role of Pt. D. V. Paluskar in the documentary 'Gaan Yogi'. In 2015, he did the background score of the film 'Nilkanth Master. And in 2018, he did the playback singing (Hindustani Classical) in the Marathi serial Saare Tujhyachsathi.

== Reviews ==
His role in The Disciple received rave reviews universally. Jay Weissberg of Variety (magazine) says, "It’s hard to imagine the film succeeding so well without lead actor Modak’s quiet concentration (not to mention vocal skills), capturing his character’s all-consuming hunger while generally projecting a never-dull placidity." Justin Chang of the Los Angeles Times says that Modak makes a "quietly magnetic screen debut." Nick Allen of Roger Ebert says, "Modak creates an emotional desperation that is as organic as Tamhane’s static camera."

== Awards ==
Year	Award	Result	Ref
2003	Pt. Vishnu Digambar Paluskar Award organised by Sharda Sangeet Vidyalaya	Won	
2004	Pt. Vishnu Digambar Paluskar Award organised by Sharda Sangeet Vidyalaya	Won	
2007	Gold Medal in Youth Festival	Won	
2009	Gold Medal in Youth Festival	Won	
2011	Gold Medal in Youth Festival	Won	
	Award for Best Outgoing Student, M.L. Dahanukar College of Commerce	Won	
2011	Chaturang Foundation Award	Won	
	Dr. Vasantrao Deshpande Award from SCZCC, Ministry of Culture, Govt. of India.	Won	
	Dr. Shrirang Sangoram Award	Won	
	Yuva Sangeet Puraskar, Hempstead, USA	Won	
2021	International Cinephile Society Award for Best Actor (The Disciple)	Won	
2022	Filmfare Award for Best Actor (The Disciple)	Won	
