= The Disciple (2020 film) =

2020 Indian Marathi drama film

- Film poster
- Directed by: Chaitanya Tamhane
- Written by: Chaitanya Tamhane
- Produced by: Vivek Gomber
- Starring: Aditya Modak; Arun Dravid; Sumitra Bhave; Deepika Bhide Bhagwat; Kiran Yadnyopavit
- Cinematography: Michał Sobociński
- Edited by: Chaitanya Tamhane
- Music by: Aneesh Pradhan
- Production companies: New Europe Film Sales; Zoo Entertainment
- Distributed by: Netflix
- Release dates: 4 September 2020 (Venice); 30 April 2021 (India)
- Running time: 127 minutes
- Country: India
- Language: Marathi

The Disciple is a 2020 Indian Marathi-language drama film written, directed and edited by Chaitanya Tamhane. It stars Aditya Modak, Arun Dravid, Sumitra Bhave, Deepika Bhide Bhagwat, and Kiran Yadnyopavit. Alfonso Cuarón serves as an executive producer.

It was entered into the main competition section at the 77th Venice International Film Festival, becoming the first Indian film since Monsoon Wedding (2001) to compete at the festival. At Venice, the film won FIPRESCI International Critics Prize presented by the International Federation of Film Critics (FIPRESCI, short for Federation Internationale de la Presse Cinematographique) and the Best Screenplay award. It was also screened at the 2020 Toronto International Film Festival, where it was named a winner of the Amplify Voices Award. Netflix acquired the distribution rights of the film and it was released through the streaming platform on 30 April 2021.

== Plot ==
Sharad Nerulkar has devoted his life to becoming an Indian classical music vocalist, following the traditions and discipline of old masters, his guru, and his father. As years go by, Sharad starts to wonder whether it is possible to achieve the excellence he is striving for.

== Cast ==
- Aditya Modak as Sharad Nerulkar
- Arun Dravid as Guruji
- Sumitra Bhave as voice of Maai
- Deepika Bhide Bhagwat
- Kiran Yadnyopavit
- Abhishek Kale
- Neela Khedkar
- Makarand Mukund
- Kristy Banerjee
- Prasad Vanarase

== Production ==
=== Development ===
After the release of his debut directorial film Court in April 2015, Chaitanya Tamhane worked through an extensive research to write a script based on Indian classical music in September 2015. Around March 2016, he started the writing works of the project which took more than 18 months to complete, as Chaitanya stated that "the first page of the script, was very difficult to crack. It took me 22 months to complete the first page and within the next two months, the entire script was completed". He did not take much time to rewrite the script as Chaitanya stated that his first draft was also the final draft of the script.

As a part of the research work, Chaitanya travelled to various cities including Delhi, Kolkata (ITC Sangeet Research Academy), Varanasi, Pune and Ahmedabad. He added that apart from interviewing musicians, he also had to form genuine friendships and build a rapport with them so that they can "open up and let understand their inner world". In an interview with The New Indian Express, Tamhane stated that "The Disciple is set in the world of classical music but it is not about musicians who draw sold-out concerts in big auditoriums, It is about musicians who are on the fringes and are a part of the subculture in Bombay."

It is a journey of an Indian classical vocalist who has been raised by his father and inculcated into this music. He has grown up on these stories of masters of the past, the secret knowledge and the intimidating, complex art form that they are trying to perfect. The kind of values that vocalists grow up on. But he is also trying to navigate a practical, real life.

— Chaitanya Tamhane, opening about the script of The Disciple in an interview with The Indian Express.

During the period of writing, Chaitanya was guided by Alfonso Cuaron whom he met during the 2016-2017 edition of the Rolex Mentor and Protege Arts Initiative. Chaitanya stated that "Cuaron had read the script and saw the editing work right up to the finished film". Sharing about his rapport with Alfonso Cuaron, Tamhane opined that "for an independent filmmaker's mind the restrictions come first. There are many other things on a practical and a technical level when it comes to filmmaking". He added that Alfonso had guided him through the work, saying "if the vision is there, the rest will follow", and also helped him motivating throughout the process. Tamhane further stated that his collaboration with Cuaron is not a "formal rapport", but he envisioned that he had a respect and gratitude for the filmmaker.

For the role of Sharad Nerulkar, Tamhane stated that the person must have abilities of singing, acting and also fluent in Marathi language. In an Hindustan Times interview, he added "We went with a newcomer [Aditya Modak, a classical singer and chartered accountant] because we figured it would be easier to get a musician who could act rather than vice-versa. But we had to do this for most of the key roles, and casting alone took us a whole year."

=== Writing ===
In Baradwaj Rangan's interview with Film Companion, Tamhane added that the essential conflict in The Disciple comes from Grey Elephants — the play he made with Vivek Gomber. He further added that "I fell in love with the theatre field because of all these stories, and secrets, this lost, ancient knowledge, and this complex, intimidating genre of music with roots in religion and spirituality. All of this collectively fascinated me. I started attending lots of classical concerts, and I travelled to places like Kolkata, Varanasi, Delhi, and even Mumbai has a really vibrant scene of Indian classical music. I began interviewing musicians. Most of the story and characters began to emerge from my part of the research work."

In a 2020 interview for Scroll.in, Tamhane added that The Disciple is made with "an amalgamation of insights" which he gained during the film's research, and also becoming his personal story, stating that "Though cinema is a much younger medium, technology booming in the 21st century, are issues relevant to Indian classical music as well". He added that many things in Indian classical music are no longer relevant or true, as the guru-shishya parampara. [student-teacher tradition]. He stated that The Disciple may bring in two worlds, which is one being the Hindustani music and the other being the customary traditions which is not seen in modern times.

=== Filming and post-production ===
Shooting of the film took place for more than two years and the film is set entirely in Mumbai. For the cinematography Tamhane roped in Michael Sobocinski from Poland after Cuaron's suggestion. While he wanted this film to be "romantic", "textured" and subjective", which is starkly different from Court, he could not find an appropriate cinematographer for the script, so he insisted Cuaron to do so. Cuaron reached out his norm cinematographer Emmanuel Lubezki, for this, who recommended Michael's name. Although he shot few commercials in India, Michael spent few months in the country to understand the subject of the film.

Tamhane approached Aneesh Pradhan, a former tabla player and music historian, whom he shared a rapport after appreciating the director's debut film Court. On describing Pradhan's music in detail, he stated that "Even if the musicians are performing traditional bandishes, they have to be curated, customised, and modified for the film. There are about five to six sequences of music in the movie, and I wanted them to shape the film’s soundscape as well as inform the viewer about what exactly is happening. The individual units of music had to work as a whole. The idea was to show the journey of a raga to great economy."

Naren Chandravarkar worked on the sound design and pre-mixing of the album. Instead of recording the musicians separately, Tamhane decided to bring entire musicians in a single room, so as to record them together. Tamhane also put up a three-camera set-up to shoot the musicians closely so that their reactions while playing the music could be captured. He further added that, this would become the reference during the actual shooting for these musicians, when they become a part of the cast during the principal shooting, stating that "The musicians reacted to the moment during the original recording of the music and I wanted to capture that".

=== Visual effects ===
Tamhane's mentor Alfonso Cuaron worked on the use of visual effects in the film, he also insisted the correct use of VFX in a way that it "becomes completely invisible to the narrative and not use it in the more obvious", which it works towards enhancing the storytelling. Cuaron is known for the accurate use of visual effects in the film and during the work for Roma, he noticed how much of VFX is included into two of its scenes - the one being the opening scene and another key scene which takes place at the beach. He added that the VFX is "insidious", which plays an "invisible part in the film". Cuaron also worked in the Dolby Atmos mixing of the background score. Tamhane was present at the sound mixing of Roma, and spent time with the engineers who trained him in using the tool more efficiently, which played a key part in the film's script.

== Release ==
The Disciple was premiered at the main competition section on 4 September 2020 at the 77th Venice International Film Festival, becoming the first Indian film since Monsoon Wedding (2001) to compete at the festival. It was also screened at the 2020 Toronto International Film Festival on 12 September 2020, which was the only Indian film to be screened at the venue. Due to the COVID-19 pandemic, the team found difficulties in getting theatres for release, and eventually sold the distribution rights to Netflix. On 3 March 2021, Netflix announced their release of the film in their first 41 Indian originals slated for the year's release. The official trailer of the film was unveiled on 26 March 2021, further announcing the release date of 30 April 2021 through the platform.

== Reception ==
On the review aggregator website Rotten Tomatoes, 96% of 56 critics' reviews are positive, with an average rating of 7.8/10. The website's consensus reads: "The rare film that captures the passion that drives the mastery of creative pursuits, The Disciple reaffirms writer-director Chaitanya Tamhane as an emerging master of his craft." Metacritic, which uses a weighted average, assigned the film a score of 83 out of 100, based on 13 critics, indicating "universal acclaim".

Nick Allen of RogerEbert.com gave the film 3.5 out of 4 stars, comparing it to Inside Llewyn Davis and wrote that it is "a great example of when filmmaking and acting styles complement each other," and calling Modak's performance "incredible."

== Accolades ==
| Award | Date of ceremony | Category | Recipient(s) | Result | Ref(s) |
|---|---|---|---|---|---|
| Venice International Film Festival | 12 September 2020 | Golden Lion | The Disciple | Nominated | |
| Venice International Film Festival | 12 September 2020 | Golden Osella for Best Screenplay | Chaitanya Tamhane | Won | |
| Venice International Film Festival | 12 September 2020 | FIPRESCI International Critics Prize | The Disciple | Won | |
| Toronto International Film Festival | 21 September 2020 | Amplify Voices Award | The Disciple | Won | |
| Independent Spirit Awards | 22 April 2021 | Best International Film | The Disciple | Nominated | |
| Asian Film Awards | 8 October 2021 | Best Film | The Disciple | Nominated | |
| Asian Film Awards | 8 October 2021 | Best Screenplay | Chaitanya Tamhane | Won | |
