= Kandavara =

- village
- Country: India
- State: Karnataka

Languages
  - Official: Kannada
- Time zone: UTC+5:30 (IST)

Kandavara is a self-contained discrete settlement/village but is Ward 14 of the Town of Chikballapur, in the state of Karnataka, India. It is in the newly created District of Chikballapur, in the taluk (township) of Chikballapur. It should not be confused with Kandavara, near Kundapura in Udipi district, which has a village with the same name.

Kandavara is 55 km (34 mi) north of Bengaluru (formerly Bangalore), the silicon plateau of India. Downtown Chikballapur is 2 km (1.2 mi) north of Kandavara, separated by a reservoir locally known as Kandavara Amanikere, and paddy fields downstream from the reservoir. The north-south State Highway SH-74 runs at the foot of the reservoir on the east side of the reservoir. State Highway SH-74 abuts Kandavara on the west side, and links Kandavara to Chikballapur in the north and the village of Nandi in the south. The former north-south National Highway NH 7, also known as Bangalore-Bellary Road or BB Road, is about 1 km (0.62 mi) east of Kandavara connected by an east–west rural partially paved road. The current NH-7 bypasses all the built up areas of Chikballapur and is located east of the city including Kandavara.

According to the 2001 Census, the population of Kandavara was approximately 4,000. Some estimates in January 2007 put the figure at 4.400.

== Tourist attractions ==
Kandavara is the home of the Heritage Primary School where Mokshagundam Visvesvarayya, India's engineer statesman and Divan of the former princely state of Mysore, did his primary schooling. The classes he attended were in the U-shaped school building built in 1845. A native son of the village, Mr. Narayana Swamy Katari, also attended the same school and went on to retire as the chief secretary of the State of Karnataka in 1967.

The Heritage Primary School was refurbished in 2006 by the Dwaraknath Reddy Ramanarpanam Trust (DRRT) under the leadership of Ms Anita Reddy. The restored building is fully functional. One classroom has been made into an interpretive centre.

=== Kandavara Kere (lake) ===
The Kandavara Kere (meaning lake in Kannada) is one of the main tourist attractions of the place. In September 2017, a foundation stone was laid to rejuvenate the lake. It is spread of 333 acres of land.

== Settlement profile ==
Fifty five kilometers north of Bangalore (or Bengaluru) lies Kandavara, a rustic village population four thousand. Kandavara city is now considered a distinct neighbourhood of the town of Chikballapur two kilometers to its north. Legally Kandavara is Ward 14 of the City Municipal Council Chikballapur. The built form of Kandavara appears like a hat from the air. Google Maps has done an excellent job of presenting the Greater Chikballapur Area including Kandavara.

Approximately 10,000 people of Kandavara, i.e., nearly 80% of the population of Kandavara consist of dalits. The built-up area of Kandavara is 7.37 square kilometers and is surrounded by agricultural land. It has eight temples and one mosque.

Kandavara has a Heritage Primary School with classes from 1st through the 7th standard located in two buildings. The first one, a U-shaped one, was built in 1845 and the second one, a block structure, was built in 1895. The 1895 building is in a very poor condition and requires extensive rehabilitation although it is being used for classroom purposes.

The Primary Health Centre (PHC) building that was at the south-western edge of Kandavara was demolished in 2009. The State of Karnataka has built a fair sized Nursing School on the 1.5-acre site. At present the school is fully functional.

In 2012 January, the not-for-profit organization, Canadia Trust, opened the polyclinic CHERE (Canadia Health, Education, and Rural Empowerment). The polyclinic is fully functional at present. The well-known Vydehi Institute of Medical Sciences located in the Whitefield neighbourhood of Bangalore sends a team of 10 health specialists every third Saturday of the month to provide advanced health care. The polyclinic serves the needy in Kandavara and surrounding villages.

Kandavara has no sanitary sewer system. It has no solid waste disposal system. Sanitary sewers and storm sewers consist of open stone-lined gutters. Water is secured through two functioning deep wells that pump water to a fair sized water tank to households have piped water supply. The water from the two wells is used for cooking and drinking and is adequate for all other purposes.

Majority of households have electricity but are subject to the chronic blackouts that is endemic to India. Cable television service is available. Mobile telephone reception is excellent.
