= Preetika Chawla =

Indian Bollywood film actress

- Born: India
- Occupation: Actress
- Years active: 2008–2023

Preetika Chawla is an Indian film actress. She started her career by starring in TV serials such as Mumbai Calling and Jyoti. She made her Bollywood debut in the 2010 film Shahrukh Bola "Khoobsurat Hai Tu", playing Laali, a die-hard fan of Bollywood Actor Shah Rukh Khan.

== Filmography ==
Year	Film/show/serial	Role	Notes
2008	Mumbai Calling	Nayna	
2009-2010	Jyoti	Rich Woman	Cameo
2009	Luck By Chance	Roshni - reporter	
2010	Shahrukh Bola "Khoobsurat Hai Tu"	Laali	
2011	Always Kabhi Kabhi	Sonia	
2012	Bring on the Night	Jigna Sanghvi	Episodes No. 6,7,10
2014	One by Two	Anika Mahajan	
2014	Sunsilk Real FM	Natasha	TV-movie
2015	Bang Baaja Baaraat	Barkha Sharma	Y-Films
2016	Better Life Foundation	Anushka	YouTube Web Series
2016	Ladies Room		
2017	Girl in the City 2	Areem	Web series
2017	Pushpavalli	Swati	Web Series
2018	Better Life Foundation 2	Anushka	Web Series
2018	Shitty Ideas Trending	Sapna	Web Series
2019	Made in Heaven	Geetanjali	Web Series
2020	Pushpavalli 2	Swati	Web Series
2023	Lootere	Ayesha	Web Series
