= Sarala Virala =

Documentary

- Directed by: Ere Gowda
- Written by: Ere Gowda
- Produced by: Hr Sujatha
- Starring: L. Narayana Reddy
- Cinematography: Ere Gowda, Namratha Naik
- Edited by: Ere Gowda
- Production company: Gudi Entertainment
- Release date: 23 February 2019 (India)
- Running time: 51 Mins
- Country: India
- Language: Kannada

Sarala Virala is a documentary by Ere Gowda released in 2019. The documentary is an insight into a simple man named L Narayan Reddy, who remains steadfast and true to his beliefs in the midst of awards, popularity, wealth, and the materialistic new-age lifestyle. He is an octogenarian organic farmer, imparting knowledge on environment-friendly agriculture gained from decades of practice to people from all walks of life.

== Awards ==
- Bangalore International Film Festival
- 66th National Film Awards Best Educational / Motivational / Instructional Film
- Winner Eurasia International Film Festival UK 2019
- Hero and Time International Film Festival of Russia 2019
- Indian Film Festival Stuttgart 2019
