= Lootere (TV series) =

2024 Indian series directed by Jai Mehta

- Promotional poster
- Genre: Action; Drama; Thriller
- Created by: Hansal Mehta; Shailesh R. Singh
- Written by: Anshuman Sinha; Vishal Kapoor; Suparn Verma
- Directed by: Jai Mehta
- Starring: Vivek Gomber; Rajat Kapoor; Amruta Khanvilkar; Martial Batchamen Tchana
- Music by: Achint Thakkar
- Country of origin: India
- Original language: Hindi
- No. of seasons: 1
- No. of episodes: 8

Production
- Producers: Waris Thakur; Ruchira Janwalikar; Ganesh Mandapeli; Aditya Singh
- Cinematography: Jall Cowasji
- Editor: Viraj Gadodia
- Camera setup: Multi-camera
- Running time: 45-50 Minutes
- Production companies: Karma Media and Entertainment

Original release
- Network: Disney+ Hotstar
- Release: 22 March – 2 May 2024

Lootere (transl. Looters) is an Indian Hindi-language action drama television series on Disney+ Hotstar created by Hansal Mehta and Shailesh R. Singh. The series is directed by Jai Mehta in his independent directorial debut and stars Vivek Gomber, Rajat Kapoor, Amruta Khanvilkar, Chandan Roy Sanyal, Martial Batchamen, Aamir Ali, Athenkosi Magamela, Chris Gxalaba and Preetika Chawla. The series tells the gripping narrative of a Ukrainian trading vessel being attacked on international waters by Somali pirates, followed by the chaos of a hostage crisis as the ship's captain, along with an Indian, Pakistani, and Bangladeshi crew, the Somali commander, and a scheming businessman, fight for control. The series is inspired by true incidents that occurred in the past when an Indian ship was similarly hijacked in Somalian waters by pirates.

The series was officially announced in September 2022. The principal photography took place in Cape Town and Khayelitsha in South Africa, thus becoming the first Indian series to be filmed on the African continent.

Lootere premiered its first two episodes on 22 March 2024 on Disney+ Hotstar. It received mostly positive reviews from critics and audiences, with particular praise for its performances, storyline and cinematography.

== Synopsis ==
The show begins with Vikrant Gandhi, who is worried about a shipment of guns arriving in Mogadishu, Somalia, on the UK Kyival. These guns are meant for a fictional militant group called Al Muharib. Vikrant, an Indian immigrant to Somalia and now the president of the port authority, is married to Avika, who was born and brought up in Somalia, where her wealth and even the color of her skin set her up for a life of privilege. Vikrant faces pressure to win the upcoming election to continue smuggling goods like these guns in and out of Somalia. Things start to go awry when a former ally, Tawfiq, decides to run for port presidency as well. Vikrant can no longer get the guns into Mogadishu port without fear of inspection. A series of events leads to the ship getting re-routed to a historical town, Harardhere, in Somalia, where pirates hijack the ship and kill one of the crew members. The transfer of power from Vikrant to Tawfiq is one of the bigger power plays in the series. There is also the power struggle between pirate leader Barkhad and his younger brother, who is so keen to take the reins that he kills his brother and shoots one of the crew members dead just because he starts to empathize with her and sees that as a sign of weakness in himself. Most of the crew, pirates, the shipowner's son's date in Ukraine, a member of Vikrant's family, and several of his household staff are dead by the time the credits roll for the last time.

== Cast ==
- Vivek Gomber as Vikrant Gandhi
- Rajat Kapoor as Captain A.K. Singh
- Amruta Khanvilkar as Avika Gandhi
- Martial Batchamen Tchana as Karim Barkhad
- Athenkosi Mfamela as Koombe
- Gaurav Sharma as Bilaal
- Chirag Vohra as Gupta
- Abhishekh Khan as Mudit Jain
- Chandan Roy Sanyal as Ajay Kotwal
- Nareshh Mallik as Gulrez Singh
- Bonga Tshabalala
- Chris Gxalaba as Taufiq
- Harry Parmar as Zafar
- Preetika Chawla as Ayesha
- Gaurav Paswala as Ruhaan
- Varin Roopani as Aaryaman Gandhi
- Deepak Tijori
- Aamir Ali as Ghulam Waris
- Anant Mahadevan as Ambassador
- Avanish Pandey as Rounal Pradhan
- Tuks Tad Lungu as Roadblock Soldier
- Pankaj Raina as Raman Kotwal
- Vijay Sasi Kumar as Krishnan
- Armaan Haggio as Tahil
- Avinash Pandey as Ronak Pradhan
- Geetanjali Gill as Satwinder
- Khemchand Verma as Pankaj Sinha
- Krishnendu Chakraborty as Lalit Kalra
- Mayank Garg as Raman Rao
- Pawan Singh as Bhavesh Mehta
- Sonam Stobgais as Sonam Stanzin
- Siyabonga Stobgais as Ismael
- Maurice Carpede as Salmaan
- Tafara Nyatsanza as Qassim
- Malibongwe Mdwaba as Salaah
- Aviwe Tucci as Pirate 1
- Aaron Nduwayo as Pirate 2
- Ellie Flory Fawcett as UK-MTO Operator
- Jai Kinara as UK-MTO Team Leader
- Tebogo Makhopane as Ahmer
- Mamello Makhetha as Jamilah
- Lesley Maasdorp as Faldi
- Lilia Kosovska as Samantha
- Jay Upadhyay as Desai
- Deon Nebulane as Bashir
- Anele Matoti as General Walid
- Thulisa Mayalo as Naz

== Episodes ==
No.	Title	Directed by	Written by	Original release date
1	"Welcome to Somalia"	Jai Mehta	Vishal Kapoor, Suparn Verma	22 March 2024
The story begins with pirates setting out to intercept a cargo ship near Somalia. Meanwhile, Vikrant Gandhi, managing illicit business and the Mogadishu port, aims to secure his re-election amidst mounting pressure and opposition. As the UK Kyival ship approaches, Vik faces challenges with illegal cargo and betrayal, resorting to desperate measures to maintain his position. Onboard the UK Kyival, Capt. AK Singh anticipates pirate threats but is ultimately overpowered, leading to the crew's capture. The narrative weaves political intrigue, personal stakes, and maritime danger, depicting Vik's pursuit of power and AK Singh's struggle against piracy amidst a backdrop of treachery and loyalty tests.
2	"Besieged"	Jai Mehta	Vishal Kapoor, Suparn Verma	22 March 2024
Capt. AK Singh and his crew are held hostage by pirates under Barkhand's command, who threaten intervention from the task force. Meanwhile, Vikrant confronts Bilal over hiring pirates to stop the ship but is reassured of cargo safety. As armed pirates search the vessel, Captain negotiates unsuccessfully for release, forced to comply with Barkhand's demand to start the ship. In the chaos, crew members like Ruhan attempt to retrieve crucial documents before capture. Vikrant manages the situation while dealing with Ajay Kotwal's urgency in Ukraine and Tawfiq's offer to sway voters. About 200 kilometers from Harardhere port, Tawfiq offers to influence voters, exposing Vikrant's location. After repairing the engine, AK plans a takeover, but Ruhan's resistance leads to tragedy, prompting Barkhand to call for reinforcements. The narrative portrays a complex mix of negotiation, betrayal, and danger as Vikrant and AK navigate perilous circumstances.
3	"Home Sweet Home"	Jai Mehta	Vishal Kapoor, Suparn Verma	28 March 2024
Salmaan instructs a group of children, including Ismael, in firearm use, juxtaposed with a scene where he intervenes to protect a bullied child, highlighting attempts to preserve innocence amid challenging circumstances. Meanwhile, on the UK KYIVAL en route to Harardhere, Barkhad confronts Kumbe for killing Mudit, emphasizing the consequences of violence on their bargaining power. Tensions escalate between Zafar and Captain over religious identity and blame for past actions. Avi and Arya argue over Ismael's disappearance. Bilal leads Vikrant and Gupta to Harardhere's shores, where relief ensues upon spotting the ship carrying a valuable consignment. However, Vikrant's shock at seeing Ismael among the pirate children complicates matters. Despite the discovery, they proceed with the mission, facing challenges such as Kumbe's determination to uncover female hostages and Ayesha's attempt to obtain food. In Kyiv, Raman Kotwal confronts his son Ajay about the hijacking, leading to concerns over negotiations and complications arising from Mudit's death. Meanwhile, Vikrant's consignment plan unravels as the container sinks, revealing its contents of guns meant for Al Muharib, jeopardizing his political aspirations. Avi and Jamilah seek help in finding Ismael, facing bureaucratic delays. Vikrant's efforts to control the situation escalate, leading to clashes among hostages and further endangering the ship's crew. Despite warnings, Vikrant considers a risky alliance with the pirates, causing dissent among his associates. As tensions rise and alliances shift, the crew's safety becomes increasingly precarious. Ultimately, the situation appears to spiral further out of control, with potential dire consequences for all involved.
4	"Middlemen"	Jai Mehta	Vishal Kapoor, Suparn Verma	4 April 2024
Tensions rise as Kumbe's torture of Ayesha reaches a critical point, causing Barkhad to step in and stop the abuse. Meanwhile, Ruhaan's attempt to console Satwinder ends with his capture by the pirates. Despite holding a knife, Ruhaan chooses not to fight, as the pirates have guns with them. Vikrant tells the South Asian crew that they will be safe, but Singh is skeptical and feels Vikrant has ulterior purposes. Vikrant's reaction to Mudit's death displays his contradictory objectives and highlights the political implications of the event. Bilal's return of Vikrant to Barkhad exposes the link between commerce and piracy. Vikrant's interactions with Avi reveal misogynistic undertones in the story, as Vikrant's acts are portrayed as misunderstood valor and Avi as unreasonable. Arya's intervention tests Vikrant's actions, adding familial strain to the plot. Singh's skepticism of Vikrant, as well as Gupta's clash with Taufiq, further complicate the situation. Avi's defiance and flight undermine Vikrant's control, prompting Gupta's angry reaction and the intensification of negotiations with the pirates. The demand for a $50 million ransom shocks the Kotwals, emphasizing the gravity of the situation and laying the groundwork for future confrontation.
5	"Dog Eat Dog"	Jai Mehta	Vishal Kapoor, Suparn Verma	11 April 2024
Gulrez's pregnant wife appears on deck, having walked up from the engine room, leading to a debate about her fate among the crew. Despite tensions, she is ultimately allowed to leave the ship for medical care. Meanwhile, Koombe challenges Vikrant and Barkhad's rule over the crew, seeking dominance. Barkhad's sibling is encouraged to rebel against him, further escalating tensions on the ship. Vikrant, grappling with personal and strategic dilemmas, considers taking Ismael with him to Mogadishu. However, Ismael, possibly brainwashed or adjusted to pirate life, refuses to cooperate. Vikrant's assistant advises against it, highlighting the risks. Meanwhile, Vikrant juggles negotiations with Ajay and the pirates, aiming to protect his interests amid growing threats. As Faisal takes control and confronts Vikrant about the missing weapons, tensions rise. The situation is complicated by Barkhad's demands for ransom and Gupta's betrayal, siding with Vikrant's enemies. Gupta's betrayal leads to dire consequences, as Vikrant retaliates violently, signaling his resolve to maintain power. The developments mark a turning point for Vikrant, who faces betrayal, threats, and moral dilemmas. With allies turning against him and enemies closing in, Vikrant resorts to extreme measures to protect his position and interests. However, his actions risk further backlash and escalate tensions within the Port Authority and among his adversaries.
6	"Zero Hundred"	Jai Mehta	Vishal Kapoor, Suparn Verma	18 April 2024
AK Singh informs Ruhan about Faisal's terrorist connections. News of the UK Kivyal hijacking spreads in India, implicating both Vikrant's and Ajay's companies in the incident. On the ship, Barkhand confronts troublemaker Koombe, escalating tensions among the crew. In Haradhere, Avika persists in her search for Ismael despite Vikrant's warnings. Waris proposes a deal to Vikrant, offering to free the crew in exchange for safety. Initially hesitant, Vikrant agrees when Faisal threatens his family over the sunken loot. As SEALs board the ship at night, chaos erupts, turning the rescue mission into a battle for survival.
7	"Betrayal"	Jai Mehta	Vishal Kapoor, Suparn Verma	25 April 2024
At a lavish party, Tawfiq charms guests with promises of prosperity if he wins the port presidency while vilifying Vikrant, alleging ties to arms trafficking. A failed rescue mission leads to Faisal mocking Barkhad's leadership and blaming Vikrant for exploiting their group. Vikrant, shocked by the rescue's failure, faces Faisal's demand to settle debts for the crew's safety. Meanwhile, tensions rise as Gabul searches for missing pirates, and Avika fears impending danger. In Ukraine, Ajay faces consequences for failing to repay Al-Muharib's debt, prompting his agreement to pay, albeit with difficulty. Tawfiq attempts to recruit Bilal, signaling his shift against Vikrant. Vikrant manages to secure ransom but escapes Faisal's men's ambush, planning to flee with the money. Back at the ship, Gabul blames AK Singh for Koombe's death, escalating tensions. Faisal discovers Vikrant's betrayal and confronts Kotwal, leading to Ajay's punishment and further discord. Barkhad's death prompts Gabul's rise as the new captain, escalating chaos within the pirate group. The summary captures the intricate web of betrayal, negotiation, and power struggles unfolding among the characters, setting the stage for further conflict and intrigue.
8	"Welcome Back to Somalia"	Jai Mehta	Vishal Kapoor, Suparn Verma	2 May 2024
Faizal, a leader of Al Muharib, suspects a connection between Ismael and Vikrant, leading him to question Ismael and manipulate him into believing Vikrant stole money from their organization. Vikrant decides to go back to the ship to rescue Ismael for his mother’s sake, since Avi and Arya won’t let him breathe until the kid is safe, where he tries to intervene, urging Ismael not to trust Faizal, but Faizal seemingly shoots Ismael to provoke Vikrant. Meanwhile, Taufiq seizes control of the Port Authority and seeks assistance from General Walid. On the UK KYIVAL, pirates resort to arson, causing chaos and suffocating the crew with smoke. Captain Singh manages to save some crew members, but others suffocate. Vikrant boards the ship to search for Ismael, encountering Singh, who warns him of an imminent explosion. Vikrant, Singh, and others evacuate as the ship erupts in flames. Waris rescues Singh and other crew members, while Vikrant heads home. Walid warns Vikrant of threats to his family and advises him to leave Somalia. Vikrant attempts to negotiate with Taufiq, but Taufiq refuses to relent until Vikrant's bloodline is eliminated. Waris and the sailors engage in a car chase with armed guards but are seemingly killed. Vikrant informs Jamila of Ismael's death, leading to a tragic breakdown. Taufiq's men attack Vikrant's house, resulting in casualties including Jamila and Vikrant's wife, Avi. Vikrant, his son Arya, and Ahmer flee into the forest, intending to leave Somalia for good. Vikrant reflects on his past decisions, regretting his involvement in illegal arms trade to strengthen his position as President of the Port Authority.

== Production ==
=== Development ===
Vishal Kapoor and Suparn Varma collaborated on the screenplay in 2019, which was inspired by a story from Anshuman Sinha. During the writing process, the authors watched numerous documentary films for inspiration. When they presented their screenplay to Mehta, he wasn't aware of piracy in depth. To enlighten him, the writers showed an Oscar-winning short film created by a Somali filmmaker. During the scripting process, Varma initially preferred Vasan Bala as the director. However, by the time the script was completed, Bala was occupied with another project, Monica, O My Darling. Subsequently, the creator, Shailesh R. Singh, approached Mehta for the directorial role. However, Mehta was also busy with his web series, Scoop. Eventually, the opportunity fell into the hands of Jai in 2021.

The series marked Jai Mehta's first independent directorial venture, previously he had co-director Scam 1992 with his father Hansal Mehta. Initially, the writers focused the story on the crew and the hostage situation. On the other hand, Jai suggested delving deeper into Vikrant's character, which resulted in its prominent significance. Jai revealed that the goal of creating this series was to change how people usually see hijacking stories and wanted to give it a fresh look and make it different from what the audience has seen before. To depict tension on screen, Jai studied various movies but was dissatisfied with them, so he referred to pictures by photographers Robert Doisneau and Steve McCurry, who aim to communicate a lot with only one frame. When the shoot commenced, only four episodes had been written, with the remaining episodes written on location.

=== Casting ===
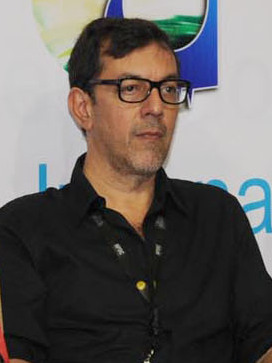
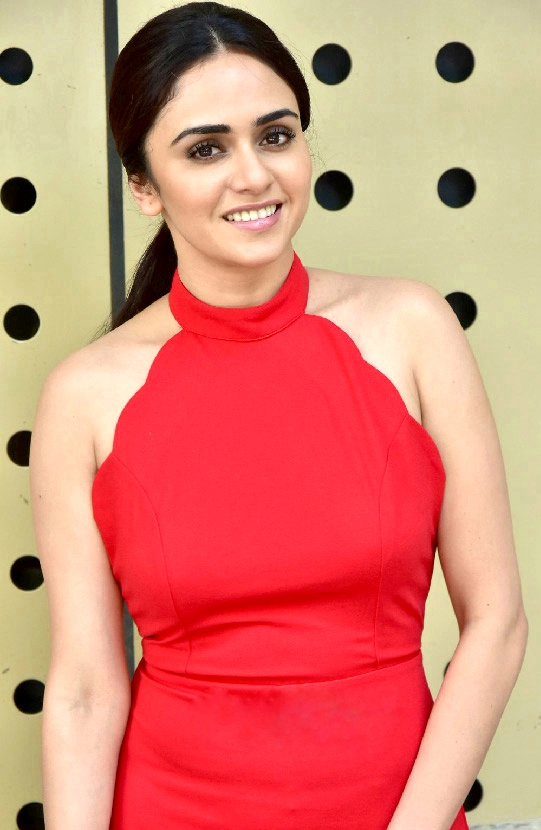
The series' main cast includes Rajat Kapoor, Vivek Gomber and Amruta Khanvilkar.

Mukesh Chhabra serves as the series' casting director. Jai thought the most difficult aspect of casting was casting pirates. Initially, they looked for Gujarati actors that resembled Africans. However, to achieve authenticity, they decided to use real African actors instead. The makers conducted auditions for numerous people for the role of Vikrant. Among them, two actors, Gomber and Gagan Dev Riar, were shortlisted. However, Chhabra recommended to Mehta that Riar would be perfect for the role of Telgi in Scam 2003. Eventually, after six months of auditions from January to July, Gomber was chosen. He underwent a final audition lasting five hours before securing the role. Khanvilkar said in an interview that she was auditioning for a different project in Chhabra's office in Andheri, Mumbai, when she heard about the series and gave an audition for Avika's role. However, at first, Chhabra felt she was unsuitable for the part. Jai was stunned by her spot-on performance during the audition, despite knowing little about the character or the overall story. The choice of Kapoor was because of his seniority, which was required for the character, while Vohra replaced another actor last-minute due to scheduling conflicts. Gaurav Sharma joined the cast based on Jai's previous collaboration with him on Gangs of Wasseypur. Four Somali actors starred in the show, while the remaining actors were of African descent.

=== Filming ===
The makers considered numerous locations, including Dubai, Ras Al Khaimah, Abu Dhabi, Sharjah, and even Gujarat, as well as putting up a set in Mumbai, but there was no ship. They even considered heading to Morocco and Egypt. During this time, Jai randomly met Mukesh Bhatt and discussed the problem; eventually, Bhatt recommended Cape Town, which was previously considered by makers but was dismissed due to potential production cost hikes. However, with Bhatt's advice, they chose Cape Town as their final destination.

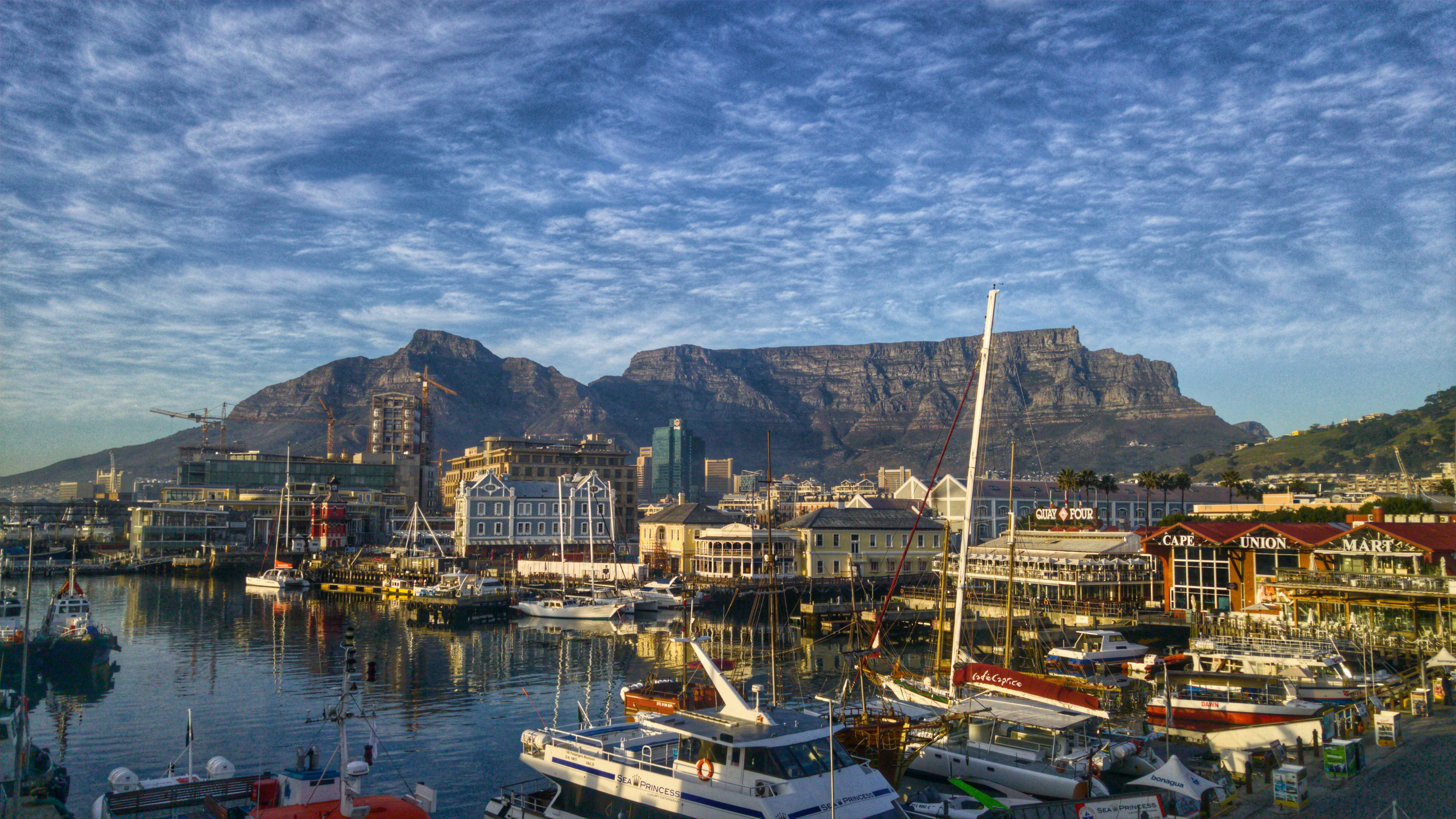
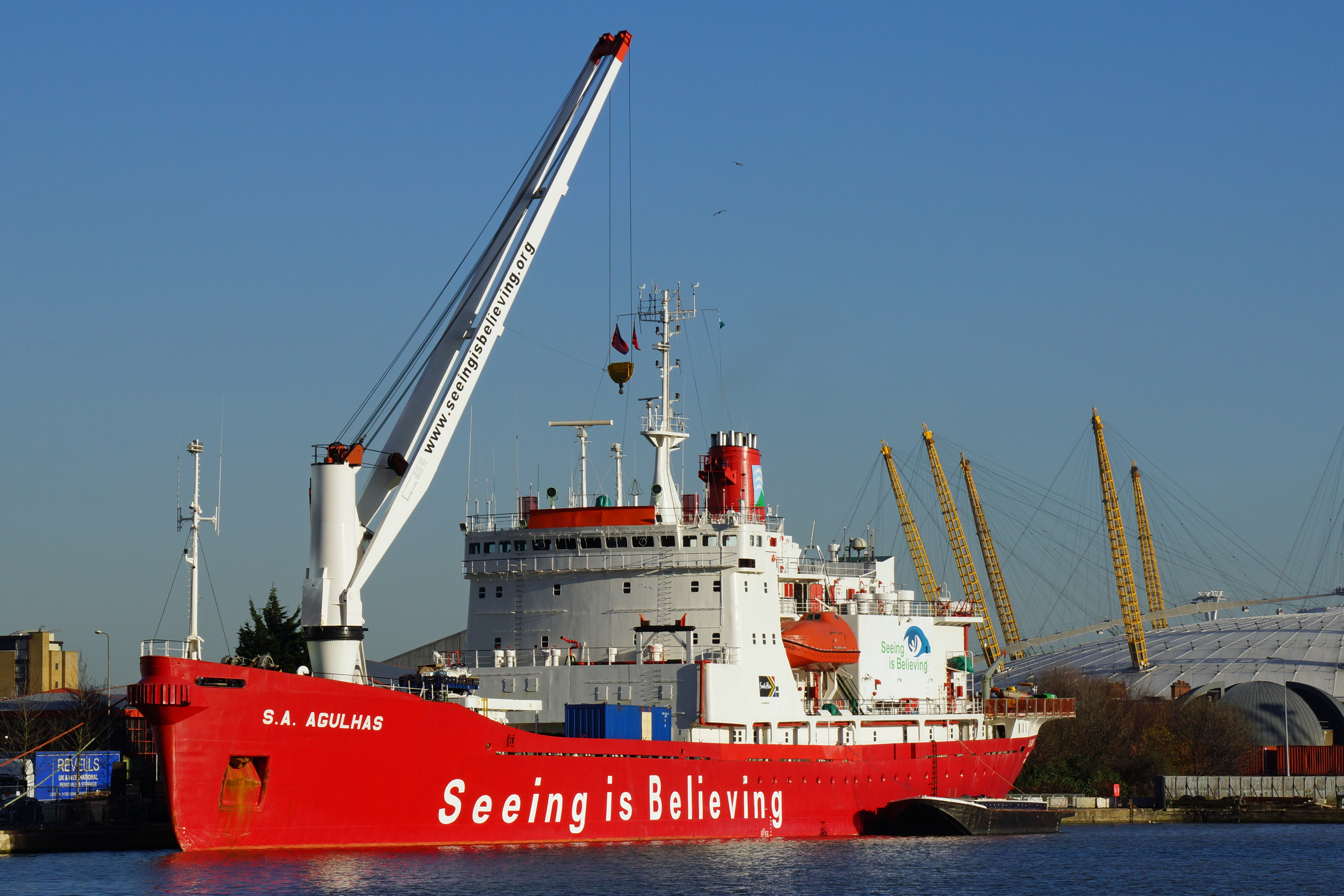
Most of the shoot was filmed at the Port of Cape Town and on the S.A. Agulhas ship.

Lootere is the first Indian web show filmed on the African continent. Due to the COVID-19 outbreak and safety concerns, the team was unable to shoot in Somalia.

The principal photography began in August 2021 and wrapped in February 2022. The team spent over six months in South Africa, with shooting lasting roughly 95–97 days. The ship sequence was shot on a South African ice-strengthened training ship and former polar research vessel, S. A. Agulhas. A team of roughly 20 persons traveled from India for the shoot and the remaining 20–21 crew members were from South Africa. Chandan Roy Sanyal portion was supposed to be shot in Ukraine but was canceled owing to warlike conditions. During the filming in Khayelitsha, the production truck was looted, which included production equipment along with groceries, and the team was also told to leave Langa, a township in Cape Town. Amruta Khanvilkar had a terrifying experience on the first day of filming in South Africa. She was in her vanity van, and because it was hot, the door was left open; a crew member immediately cautioned her to close the door to avoid kidnapping. Aamir Ali, portraying an undercover agent, did the climax stunt of chasing a car for five consecutive days by himself. The stuntman declined to go to Khayelitsha, reportedly the world's largest and most perilous slum, due to fear of the area. The filming also took place on Mumbai's isolated Kalamb Beach.

=== Music ===
The original score of Lootere, was composed by Achint Thakkar, who previously worked with Mehta on Scam 1992 and Scoop. The theme music of the series received a rave response from listeners and critics. Tatsam Mukherjee of The Wire reviewed the music, saying, "It has its roots in Afro-pop, but also manages to weave in the sound of ‘70s Salim-Javed noirs – evoking images of Amitabh Bachchan sporting crisp suits, sunglasses, profusely smoking cigarettes while overlooking deals of smuggled gold biscuits."

Track listing
No.	Title	Lyrics	Music	Singer(s)	Length
1.	"Lootere Theme Music"		Achint Thakkar		1:10
2.	"Aap Ki Aadatein"	Nikita Ahuja	Nikita Ahuja	Nikita Ahuja	1:01
Total length:					2:11

== Marketing and release ==
The teaser of the series was unveiled on 8 September 2022, through the YouTube channel of Disney+ Hotstar. The 42-second teaser presents a glimpse like a montage, cutting between shots of a stationed cargo ship and a group of armed Somalian pirates making headway towards it. The service announced two new series along with Lootere. On 1 March 2024, Mehta unveils a short teaser with the release date. The new teaser opens with a group of foreign men aboard a boat in the middle of the sea, armed with guns and seemingly heading towards an undisclosed destination. Kapoor, portraying a man in a Navy uniform on a nearby ship, spots them through binoculars with a tense expression. As the men prepare for an impending attack, the teaser concludes. Makers promoted the series as a "Game Of Life And Death" Subsequently, the official trailer was released on 6 March 2024. The trailer received wide acclaim from audience. Following this, the makers dropped the theme song, which got rave reviews from critics and the audience.

The series premiered its first two episodes on 22 March 2024 on its streaming platform, while the remaining episodes will be released on a weekly basis on every Thursday. The series was originally shot in Hindi and was dubbed into Bengali, Kannada, Malayalam, Marathi, Telugu, and Tamil languages in order to have a wide reach towards the audiences.

== Reception ==
=== Critical response ===
Saibal Chatterjee of NDTV rated 3 out of 5 stars, praised its writing, cinematography, and direction for incorporating the personal and the emotional in the wider, wilder world that the show is located in, and wrote "The marital drama strand, bolstered by strong performances from Gomber and Khanvilkar, adds emotional depth to the plot. The rest of the show is all about the men gunning for each other." Critic Subhash K. Jha gave it a perfect 4 out of 5 stars, calling it "An Edge of the Seat Experience." He commended the director's vision, writing, and cinematography and said, "This is a series designed for the large screen. The scaling down, however, doesn’t diminish the viewing pleasure." Deepa Gahlot of Rediff.com rated 3/5 stars and wrote, "Lootere deserves points for originality and novelty." Shubhra Gupta for The Indian Express also gave it 3 out of 5 stars and stated "This is a tense, high-wire hostage drama which doesn’t dial back on danger, and manages to keep its stakes high: I enjoyed it, and the addictive title theme by Achint Thakkar is my newest earworm." In The Hindu, Shilajit Mitra called Lootere "ambitious hijack drama" and summed, "The series has a tendency towards graphic brutality for shock—bleeding noses, severed limbs, a head popped open over lunch—which feels both desperate and a little surprising, given Mehta’s relative control over the material."

Tushar Joshi of India Today gave it a rating of 3.5 out of 5 while distinguishing it from Tom Hanks’s 2013 Academy Award-nominated Captain Phillips, who wrote, "Comparisons are bound to happen. But Lootere goes beyond the obvious and presents characters and a premise that isn’t bound by the railings of a shore-bound sea vessel." He added that the series "works because it doesn’t get trapped in the easy-set formula of men battling pirates." The Times of India reviewer Ronak Kotecha wrote in his 3.5-star review that it "remains buoyed by its thrilling narrative and engaging performances, sailing through turbulent waters to deliver ample entertainment and intrigue to its audience" and mentioned, "What really pushes the show forward is its adrenaline-pumping action onboard the ship and in the dusty bylanes of Somalia, deftly captured by Jall Cowasji." Varsha Yadav of Punjab Kesari awarded it 3.5 out of 5 stars and called it "an attempt has been made to show something new in Indian cinema. In this show, we have seen some things that are usually seen on the big screen, like larger than life." Sonal Pandya for Times Now gave the film 3/5 stars and said it was unique for Indian audiences, stating, "The hijack thriller led by Hansal Mehta has its moments, but sometimes it feels like it's circling the same point again to stretch out the suspense." Swaroop Kodur of The Federal reviewed "Lootere is an enjoyable watch that has many bright moments and a gripping storyline... The writing could have used a lot more agency, and certain characters required stronger motivations to do what they do, but the frequent thrills somewhat salvage the show." Udita Jhunjhunwala of Mint praised production and Mehta's direction: "The locations and terrain, along with a blend of Indian and international actors, add authenticity to a well-produced show. Jai Mehta builds tension well and hits a high note in the execution of the action scenes." Rahul Desai of Film Companion gave it a positive review: "It's a lot to handle. But I like that Lootere is not limited to the micro-dramas of a hijacked ship. It's not a pretty balancing act, but a necessary one."

Saheli Maity of Bollywood Bubble praised the cinematography and storyline as the highlights of the series, saying, "Lootere is a crime survival thriller that manages to hold your attention in parts. The standout performances by Gomber and Kapoor are worth mentioning," giving it 2.5 stars. Nandini Ramnath of Scroll.in opined, "...could have looked closer at Indian-origin businessmen who have lived in African countries for generations and become a part of the local economy and politics." and concluded, "Lootere struggles to be in charge both on the high seas and on the ground." A critic of The Free Press Journal wrote, "Certain episodes may feel slightly drawn out, impacting the overall momentum of the narrative," and overall stated, "Despite its ambitious scope and compelling narrative, Lootere is a decently well-made thriller," giving it 3 stars.

Critic Vinamra Mathur from Firstpost rated 2.75 out of 5 stars and lauded its effort, stating, "Survival dramas don’t need to rely on any confined space, and Lootere displays that." Vaibhavi Mishra of Gadgets 360 wrote that "Lootere is a decent crime thriller worth a watch... is somewhat new territory for the Indian digital space and even cinema, which means fewer cliches." Reviewer Archi Sengupta appreciated the storyline and depiction of Somalia and its people and said, "In spite of its thrilling premise and some emotional moments, Lootere leaves you a little annoyed because of its rather stupid characters who, for some reason, do not understand the concept of consequences for your actions... the politics shown is pretty good, the acting is great, and I also loved the opening credits and the score, which encapsulate this high-octane action series well." Aishwarya Vasudevan for OTTPlay called it "a grim depiction of Somali piracy seen through Indian eyes. The series has admirable intentions of delving deeply, but it has trouble keeping up with its own tempo, which makes you feel lost and confused." News18 critic Gautaman Bhaskaran stated, "...although the series keeps us invested in the narrative, it does sometimes go around in circles."

The Quint critic Pratikshya Mishra gave 3 out of 5 stars, saying, "the show does test your patience in bits" but she applauded the acting, dialogue, and music, adding, "Thakkar’s catchy title theme is only the cherry on top." Mrunal Shubedar of Hauterrfly found, "Despite solid performances by Kapoor, Gomber, Khanvilkar, and more, this Hansal Mehta series hovers in limbo between its promising storyline and the tight execution it misses at times, but the exceptional cast takes it forward smoothly, resulting in a good viewing experience," with an average rating of 3/5.

Reviewer Manik Sharma was broadly positive about the series and wrote, "It’s lifted by terrific performances, punctuated by a great background score, and even though it dips in terms of momentum every now and then sails out to sea on a high. It’s one of the few times an Indian show’s ambition seems to augur well for the slippery, at times isolated, self-indulgence storytelling can often reek of." Aarti Barode of Hindustan Times Marathi concluded that "'Lootere' can be a part of Hanzal Mehta's hit list. If you also like watching crime thriller series or water-level crime thrillers, then this series can be a suitable option for you." Snigdha Nalini for Outlook India rated 2.5 out of 5 stars, described the series as "fresh" and noted, "The show deserves praise because of how ambitious it is." Cinema Express critic Shreyas Pande awarded it 3.5 out of 5 stars. He lauded the smart writing and visceral performances, concluding, "In the ocean of possibilities, Lootere is a ship that sails with silent grace. All the elements come together and work like a charm." Prabhatha Rigobertha of South First appreciated the cinematography and performance (particularly of Gomber and Batchamen) and wrote "Despite the pacing issues, good performances and the atmospherics make this action-on-the-high-seas web show worth a watch" with an rating of 3 out of 5 stars.

For six weeks in a row, the series was ranked among Film Companion's top five most-viewed shows and movies of the week, with views ranging from 4.0 to 2.5 million.
