= Thithi (film) =

- Thithi Kannada Poster
- Directed by: Raam Reddy
- Screenplay by: Eregowda; Raam Reddy
- Produced by: Pratap Reddy; Sunmin Park
- Starring: Thammegowda S. Channegowda; Abhishek H. N. Pooja S.M.
- Cinematography: Doron Tempert
- Edited by: John Zimmerman; Raam Reddy
- Production companies: Prspctvs Productions; Maxmedia
- Release dates: 10 August 2015 (Locarno Film Festival); 6 May 2016 (India)
- Running time: 120 minutes
- Country: India
- Language: Kannada

Thithi (Funeral) is a 2015 Indian Kannada drama film co-written and directed by Raam Reddy. Consisting of a cast of non-professional actors from villages in the Mandya district of Karnataka, the film is a (semi-) light-hearted story about three generations of men reacting to the death of their 101-year old patriarch. It is an Indian-American co-production, jointly produced by Pratap Reddy from Prspctvs Productions and Sunmin Park from Maxmedia.

Thithi premiered at the 68th Locarno International Film Festival on 8 August 2015, where it won the Golden Leopard - Filmmakers of the Present category as well as the First Feature award. Consequently, it was screened at various film festivals around the world and won numerous awards including the National Film Award for Best Feature Film in Kannada at the 63rd National Film Awards. It was released in Karnataka on 6 May 2016 and in the rest of India on 3 June 2016 to generally positive reviews.

== Plot ==
Thithi is a dramatic comedy about how three generations of sons react to the death of the oldest in their clan, a man named Century Gowda: a locally renowned, highly cantankerous 101-year-old man. Set in a remote village in Karnataka's Mandya district, the three storylines intertwine before converging at Century Gowda's 'thithi' — the final funeral celebration, 11 days after a death.

Century Gowda's eldest son, Gaddappa (literally translating to "Beard Man"), is himself a little old man who spends his time nonchalantly wandering the village fields, puffing cheap cigarettes and swigging brandy. Gaddappa's far more materialistic son, Thammanna, plots to illegally sell Century Gowda's five-acre property, even though the land officially belongs to his father. At the same time, Thammanna's confident pubescent son, Abhi, shrugs his responsibilities to relentlessly pursue a shepherd girl, Kavery (Pooja S.M.)

== Cast ==
- Channegowda as Gaddappa
- Thammegowda as Thammanna
- Abhishek H.N as Abhi
- Pooja S.M. as Kaveri
- Singrigowda as Century Gowda

== Development and production ==
The seed that gave rise to Thithi was planted during a visit that Reddy made to Nodekoppalu village in the Mandya district of Karnataka, the home town of the film's co-writer Eregowda. Reddy found the village, seen through the eyes of an insider, to contain within itself a highly cinematic world. Reddy then did a year-long stint at Prague Film School. Upon returning, he re-visited the area frequently, conducting a three-month exploratory process to better acquaint himself with the world. During this process, Eregowda and Reddy met and decided to revolve the film around three protagonists, Channegowda (Gaddappa), Thammegowda S. (Thammanna), and Abhishek H.N. (Abhi), even before the idea for the story of the film had taken shape. Keeping the true life personalities of these three leads in mind, Reddy and Eregowda then began developing a screenplay that revolved around the death and thithi of a 101-year old cantankerous centenarian, Century Gowda. After Reddy and Eregowda finished the script, they had an ambitious 160 page screenplay with over a hundred characters. They then moved into pre-production work which included an eight-month long casting process to find actors to fill out smaller roles and putting together a crew for the film. At this stage, DoP Doron Tempert, Reddy's batchmate from Prague Film School, joined the development process and started building the story-telling style and approach with Reddy.

Production started in Nodekoppalu in January 2014. The film was shot in multiple schedules split over a period of five months, the longevity of the shoot owing to the logistical challenges of working with non-actors. When the film was in the rough cut stage, the film made it into NFDC's Film Bazaar where it was adjudged as the Best Work In Progress fiction feature and awarded a free digital intermediate at Prasad Labs, Mumbai. The film, still a work-in-progress, premiered at the Locarno Film Festival in August, and then went on to have its Indian Premiere at the Mumbai Film Festival. The film was finally completed in December 2015.

== Reception ==
Professional ratings
Review scores
Source	Rating
The Times of India	4.5/5 stars
Deccan Chronicle	4.5/5 stars
IANS	4/5 stars
Hindustan Times	4.5/5 stars
Slant Magazine	3/4 stars
Rediff	5/5 stars
MUBI	4/5 stars
Vijaya Karnataka	4/5 stars
Bangalore Mirror	4.5/5 stars
The Indian Express	4.5/5 stars

Thithi has received largely positive reviews on the International front with The Hollywood Reporter calling it "a whimsically enjoyable encounter with some slippery backwoods characters." Clayton Dillard of Slant Magazine gave the film 3 out of 4 stars and said that "the film packs in a miniseries worth of conflict" and that it "possesses the spirit of Yasujirō Ozu." In an enthusiastic review, Daniel Kasman from MUBI had this to say: "A film that is funny, humane, and seemingly effortless, this young director has coaxed from a massive cast and a specific setting a great deal of character, an evocation of a locality and its society, and wrapped it all in a Renoirian understanding of human behaviour. The film is a real pleasure." The Variety review by Dennis Harvey praised the film for being "a clever social satire" that is "complexly plot-driven yet never hectic or over-contrived." The review went on to commend the performers by saying that "they're all such naturals it's almost hard to believe they came to the project as amateurs."

The film was received with utmost enthusiasm by the Indian press on its release in Karnataka as well. In a 4.5 star review for Times Of India, Sunayana Suresh compared the film to the classic The Gods Must Be Crazy "as a film that triumphs as both a clever narrative and a hearty entertainer." In yet another 4.5 star review, Shyam Prasad S. of Bangalore Mirror called the film "an experience to savour." The film was called "a milestone for Kannada cinema" by Deccan Herald, while The New Indian Express declared it to be "one of the finest films to come out of India in recent times."

== Awards and nominations ==
Thithi premiered at the 68th Locarno International Film Festival on 8 August 2015, where it won the Golden Leopard in the "Filmmakers of the Present" category as well as the First Feature award. It has also won numerous other awards at various film festivals including Mumbai, Palm Springs, and Marrakech. It was also invited to be a part of the 45th edition of New Directors/New Films. At the 19th Shanghai International Film Festival, Thithi won the Best Script Writer and the Best Film awards under the Asia New Talent Awards Category. It won the German Star of India award for the Best Feature Film at the 13th Indian Film Festival Stuttgart, Germany. At the 63rd National Film Awards, the film won the National Film Award for Best Feature Film in Kannada It bagged the First Best Film, Best Supporting Actress and Best Dialogue awards at the 2016 Karnataka State Film Awards.

Year	Award	Category	Recipient	Result
2015	63rd National Film Awards	National Film Award for Best Feature Film in Kannada	Prspctvs Productions Pvt. Ltd. Raam Reddy	Won
2015	68th Locarno International Film Festival	Golden Leopard - Filmmakers of the Present	Raam Reddy	Won
2015	68th Locarno International Film Festival	Swatch Best First Feature	Raam Reddy	Won
2015	Mumbai Film Festival	Jury Grand Prize	Raam Reddy	Won
2015	Marrakech International Film Festival	The Jury Prize for Best Director	Raam Reddy	Won
2015	Palm Springs International Film Festival	New Voices/New Visions Special Jury Mention	Raam Reddy	Won
2015	Palm Springs International Film Festival	New Voices/New Visions Grand Jury Prize	Raam Reddy	Nominated
2016	Pune International Film Festival	Best Director	Raam Reddy	Won
2016	8th Bengaluru International Film Festival	Best Asian Film	Raam Reddy	Won
2016	San Francisco International Film Festival	Golden Gate Persistence of Vision Award	Raam Reddy	Won
2016	Karnataka State Film Awards	First Best Film	Prspctvs Productions Pvt Ltd.	Won
2016	Karnataka State Film Awards	Best Supporting Actress	Pooja S. M.	Won
2016	Karnataka State Film Awards	Best Dialogue	Eregowda	Won
2016	19th Shanghai International Film Festival	Best Film (Asian New Talent Award)	Prspctvs Productions Pvt Ltd.	Won
2016	19th Shanghai International Film Festival	Best Director (Asian New Talent Award)	Raam Reddy	Nominated
2016	19th Shanghai International Film Festival	Best Script Writer (Asian New Talent Award)	Eregowda; Raam Reddy	Won
2016	13th Indian Film Festival Stuttgart	Best Feature Film (German Star of India)	Raam Reddy	Won
2016	1st BRICS Film Festival	Best Film	Eregowda; Raam Reddy	Won
2016	Indian Film Festival The Hague - IFFTH	Audience Award	Raam Reddy	Won
2017	64th Filmfare Awards South	Best Film	Prspctvs Productions Pvt Ltd.	Won
