= Balekempa =

- Directed by: Ere Gowda
- Produced by: Vivek Gomber, Chaitanya Tamhane
- Starring: Jnanesh, Bhagya Shree, Chandrashekar C.S, Nagaraju D.P
- Cinematography: Saumyananda Sahi
- Edited by: Saumyananda Sahi
- Music by: Benedict Taylor, Naren Chandavarkar
- Production company: Zoo Entertainment Pvt Ltd
- Release date: 2018
- Country: India
- Language: Kannada

Balekempa (translation: The Bangle Seller) is a 2018 Kannada drama film written and directed by Ere Gowda. Produced by Zoo Entertainment Pvt Ltd, the film is about the relationship between a travelling bangle seller and his wife. The film was included in the list of the ten most notable films at the International Film Festival Rotterdam.

== Synopsis ==
Kempanna, the bangle seller, roams the countryside adorning the hands and faces of women with beauty products. Yet he seems to have little time for his own wife, Saubaghya. Indeed, the only activity that husband and wife do together is taking care of Kempanna's invalid mother. Otherwise, Kempanna seems to prefer the company of his childhood friend, Hanuma, in the quiet and private setting of Hanuma's farm. Meanwhile, Saubaghya's only companion is the neighbour's teenage son Mahesha, who delivers the milk and can't quite control his hormones. The now long married couple's inability to conceive is a concern for Saubaghya's mother who goes to the local deity and prays for the boon of a child. However, without Kempanna's participation, prayers have little effect.

When Saubaghya insists on getting a life insurance policy and disappears to her mother's house, Kempanna has to face what is really wrong with their marriage.

== Awards ==
Year	Country	Festival	Category	Result	Comments
2018	Brazil!	International Film Festival in São Paulo	Competição de Novos Diretores (New Directors Competition)		
2018	India	Dharamshala International Film Festival			
2018	India	Mumbai Academy of the Moving Image	Indiagold		Indian Premier
2018	Japan	Fukuoka International Film Festival, Japan			Japanese Premier
2018	Poland	Transatlantyk Festival, Poland	New Cinema		
2018	Australia	Asia Pacific Screen Awards	Achievement in Cinematography	Nominated	
2018	Australia	Indian Film Festival of Melbourne		Nominated	Australian Premiere
2018	South Korea	Jeonju International Film Festival	World Cinemascape		
2018	South Korea	Las Palmas de Gran Canaria International Film Festival			
2018	Canada	International Film Festival of South Asia, Toronto			Canada Premiere
2018	UK	East End Film Festival			UK Premiere
2018	USA	New York Indian Film Festival	Best film	Nominated	US Premiere
2018	USA	New York Indian Film Festival	Best director	Nominated	US Premiere
2018	Netherlands	International Film Festival Rotterdam	FIPRESCI Award	Won	"For its subtle and delightful portrayal of a universal theme against the background of a rich local culture."
2017	India	NFDC Film Bazaar	Work-in-Progress Lab	Won	
