= The President Is Coming =

- Movie poster
- Directed by: Kunaal Roy Kapur
- Written by: Anuvab Pal
- Produced by: Rohan Sippy
- Starring: Konkona Sen Sharma; Shernaz Patel; Shivani Tanksale; Namit Das; Vivek Gomber; Satchit Puranik; Ira Dubey
- Cinematography: Keshav Prakash
- Music by: Siddhartha Khosla
- Release date: 9 January 2009
- Running time: 86 minutes
- Country: India
- Language: English

The President Is Coming is a 2009 Indian English-language satirical mockumentary film directed by Kunaal Roy Kapur based on his play by the same title which premiered at the Royal Court/Rage Theatre Festival in Mumbai in January 2006. The film, written by Anuvab Pal, marks Kapur's debut as a director and features an ensemble cast including Konkona Sen Sharma as a Bengali writer and a social activist. The film explores a day in the life of six contestants who will stop at nothing as the US president is coming to town. Konkona plays Maya Roy, one of the six contestants who will represent New India in front of the President.

== Plot ==
In 2006, George W. Bush, President of the United States, visits India. In addition to the many diplomatic and political things on the agenda is a rather unusual event — a meeting with the young faces responsible for shaping "The New India". The six contestants are Maya Roy, India's best young writer; Ajay Karlekar, India's best young social activist; Archana Kapoor, India's best young entrepreneur; Rohit Seth, call center accent trainer; Kapil Dev Dholakia, India's best young stock investor, and Ramesh S, software engineer.

They have to undergo bizarre tests and activities to top the list. In the end only two are left Kapil and Maya. Kapil is caught cheating in the final round and Maya is selected. However, with a bizarre turn of events she is not the one who shakes the hand.

== Cast ==
- Konkona Sen Sharma as Maya Roy
- Shernaz Patel as Samantha Patel
- Shivani Tanksale as Ritu Johnson
- Anand Tiwari as Kapil Dev
- Namit Das as Ramesh S.
- Vivek Gomber as Rohit Seth
- Satchit Puranik as Ajay Karlekar
- Ira Dubey as Archana Kapoor
- Imran Rasheed as Mohammed Aslam (Security guard)
- Manish Acharya
- Faezeh Jalali as Nun

== Soundtrack ==
Goldspot did the soundtrack, featuring the songs "Paper Boats", "Under the House", and "Haath Mein Le Lenge". The film's music was written by Siddhartha Khosla.

== Reception ==
Taran Adarsh from IndiaFM gave the film a 3 out of 5 rating and concluded that it "...offers laughter aplenty and that is its biggest USP. Recommended for the multiplex junta." The Times of India gave the film 3 out of 5 stars, concluding, "The film has a raw look and lacks finesse when it comes to production values. But there is a delightful tongue-in-cheek tenor running through it, which makes you overlook the unpolished feel and the loose editing." Rajeev Masand from CNN-IBN described it as "... an enjoyable film that pushes the boundaries of conventional storytelling. Don't miss this film or you'll regret it."

Adarsh stated, "Director Kunaal Roy Kapur knows what he's talking and for a first-timer, makes a remarkable debut." Nikhat Kazmi from The Times of India wrote, "Performance-wise, it's the uptight and complex-ridden Ms. Konkona who walks away with laurels and laughs even as the film takes a healthy snigger at the desi self."
