= Shahrukh Bola "Khoobsurat Hai Tu" =

- Official poster
- Directed by: Makrand Deshpande
- Produced by: Amarjeet Singh
- Starring: Preetika Chawla; Afzal Khan
- Cinematography: Pathan Parvez Khan
- Distributed by: Media Factory
- Release date: 19 November 2010 (India)
- Country: India
- Language: Hindi

Shahrukh Bola "Khoobsurat Hai Tu" (transl. Shahrukh said "You are Beautiful") is a 2010 Indian Hindi-language film directed by Makrand Deshpande and produced by Amarjeet Singh Bhasin under the Music Factory banner. It stars Preetika Chawla and Afzaal Khan in the lead roles, and Shahrukh Khan as himself in a cameo appearance. It was released on 19 November 2010.

== Plot ==
Laali is one of the biggest fans of Shah Rukh Khan in the city. She believes that one day she will meet him in person and be his heroine, although for now, she sells flowers by the road to make money for her family, brother (Menon), and boyfriend Vicky (Afzaal). One day, while selling flowers, she stops near a car when she hears a voice asking for some flowers. She goes over and finds Khan in the front seat. She nearly faints, but Khan grabs her and says "Khoobsurat Hai Tu" ("You are Beautiful"). Nobody believes her, and her efforts to prove that she met him form the rest of the story.

== Cast ==
- Preetika Chawla as Laali
- Afzaal Khan as Vicky
- Sanjay Dadhich as John
- Suzanne Bernert as Stefanie Meyer
- Makrand Deshpande (Director, cameo)
- Shah Rukh Khan (Cameo)

== Production ==
The film was shot in Mumbai, India. It marks the debut of Afzaal Khan and Preetika Chawla.

== Reception ==
=== Critical response ===
Anupama Chopra of NDTV gave it 2 out of 5 stars. Nikhat Kazmi of The Times of India rated the film 3/5.
