= Vira Sathidar =

Indian actor, poet, editor, and Dalit rights activist (1958–2021)

- Born: 7 June 1958; Parsodi, Maharashtra, India
- Died: 13 April 2021 (aged 62); Nagpur, Maharashtra, India
- Occupations: Poet; singer; actor; editor; activist
- Notable work: Court (2014)

Vira Sathidar (7 June 1958 – 13 April 2021) was an Indian poet, actor, editor, and Dalit rights activist known for his lifelong struggle against caste oppression and systemic injustice. He gained international recognition for playing the lead role in the 2014 Marathi-language film Court, which won several awards globally, including the Best Feature Film at the National Film Awards in India.

== Early life ==
Vira Sathidar was born as Vijay Vairagade on 7 June 1958, in the village of Parsodi, near Nagpur, to Rauf and Gangubai Sathidar. In an interview with the Indian Cultural Forum, he spoke about growing up amid layers of caste-based discrimination. Sathidar also credited Ambedkarite cultural influences as a major part of his upbringing, citing inspiration from the songs of Dalit poets and singers such as Vamandada Kardak, Nagorao Patankar, Govindrao Mhashilkar, and Laxman Rajguru.

== Career ==
Throughout his life, Sathidar actively participated in anti-caste movements. He served as the convener of Indian People’s Theatre Association (IPTA) and was the editor of the Marathi magazine Vidrohi. He also authored the book titled Sanvidhan Va Lokshahi.

In the 2014 Marathi-language legal drama Court, Sathidar portrayed Narayan Kamble, a poet and singer accused of inciting the suicide of a manual scavenger through one of his folk songs. The film received widespread critical acclaim and won the National Film Award for Best Feature Film. Sathidar's performance as Narayan Kamble was praised for its realism, closely mirroring his real life activism which brought authenticity to the role. Apart from Court, Sathidar also appeared in other films and short films, including a role in the 2021 Marathi film Jayanti.

Sathidar died of complications of Covid-19 on 13 April 2021 at a hospital in Nagpur, Maharashtra.

== See also ==
- Sudhir Dhawale
- Dalit Panthers
