= Prague Film School =

Private film school in the Czech Republic

Coordinates: 50°4′43.22″N 14°24′57.4″E

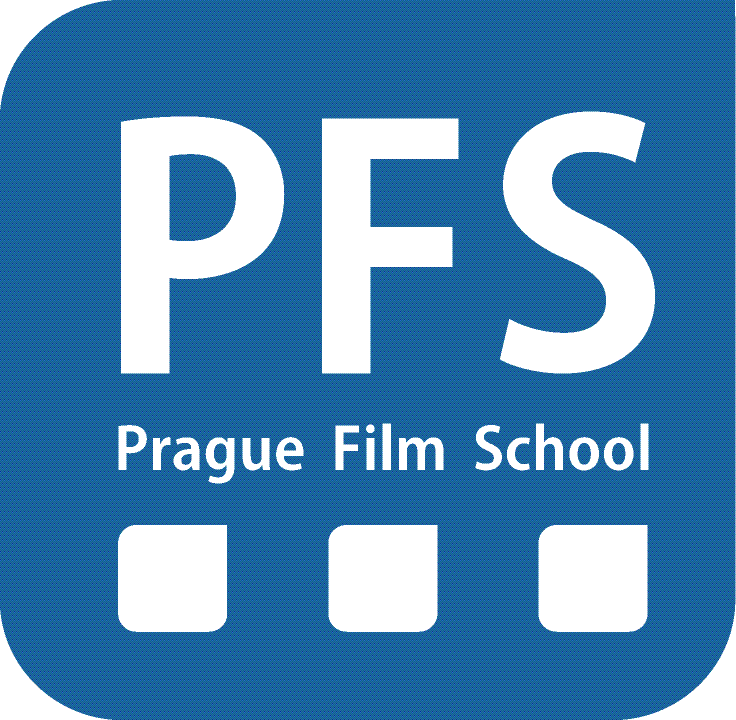
- Type: Film school
- Established: 2002
- Total staff: 30
- Students: ~100
- Location: Pstrossova 19, Prague, 110 00, Czech Republic
- Campus: Urban
- Language: English
- Website: www.praguefilmschool.cz

Prague Film School is an international institution offering practical training in filmmaking and screen acting, based in Prague, Czech Republic. The school provides both interdisciplinary and specialized studies in film production disciplines, including directing, screenwriting, cinematography, editing, as well as programs in Acting for Film and Documentary Film. In 2022 and 2023 the school was ranked among the Top 15 International Film Schools by The Hollywood Reporter.

== Overview ==
Prague Film School combines the traditions of European art-house cinema with American independent filmmaking styles. Instruction is conducted in English. The institution has affiliate study-abroad partnerships with several U.S. universities, such as Northwestern University, Oberlin College, Sarah Lawrence College.

Prague Film School alumni are frequently represented at film festivals and award platforms, including Locarno, Tribeca, Sundance, Cannes, and the Academy Awards.

== Departments and programs ==
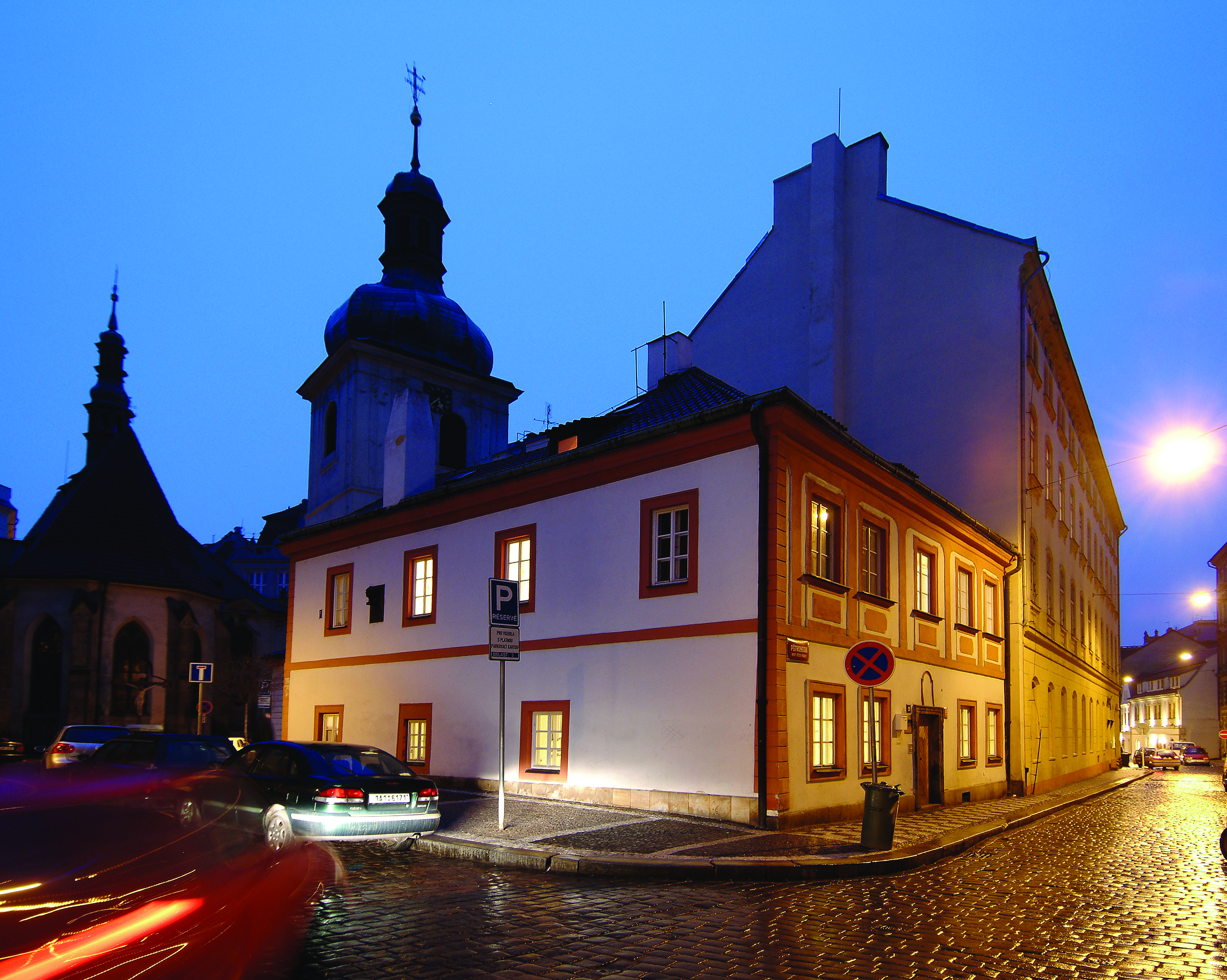
Prague Film School

Prague Film School offers full-time studies in Narrative Filmmaking, Documentary Filmmaking, and Acting for Film. The Acting for Film program was founded by American casting director Nancy Bishop. The school also offers a second-year course.

== Notable alumni ==
Alumni	Notability	Work	Ref.
Jay Pinak Oza	Indian cinematographer	Raman Raghav 2.0, Gully Boy,Made in Heaven	
Levi Meaden	Canadian actor	Aftermath, The Killing	
Lilli Cooper	American actress and singer	Fraggle Rock: Back to the Rock	
Raam Reddy	Indian film director	Thithi, The Fable	
Rachel House	New Zealand actress and director	Whale Rider, Moana, Thor: Ragnarok, The Mountain	
Ziya Demirel	Turkish film director	Salı, Ela ile Hilmi ve Ali	
Haolu Wang	Chinese director and screenwriter	Black Mirror, Doctor Who	
