= Court (2014 film) =

2014 film by Chaitanya Tamhane

- Theatrical release poster
- Directed by: Chaitanya Tamhane
- Written by: Chaitanya Tamhane
- Produced by: Vivek Gomber
- Starring: Vira Sathidar; Vivek Gomber; Geetanjali Kulkarni; Pradeep Joshi; Usha Bane; Shirish Pawar
- Cinematography: Mrinal
- Music by: Sambhaji Bhagat lal
- Production company: Zoo Entertainment
- Distributed by: Zeitgeist Films; Artscope Films; Memento Films
- Release dates: 4 September 2014 (Venice Film Festival); 17 April 2015 (India)
- Running time: 116 minutes
- Country: India
- Languages: Marathi; Hindi; Gujarati; English
- Budget: ₹3.5 crore

Court is a 2014 Indian legal drama film, written and directed by Chaitanya Tamhane in his directorial debut. The film examines the Indian legal system through the Mumbai Sessions Court trial of an aging protest singer, Narayan Kamble (Vira Sathidar), who is accused of encouraging a manhole worker to commit suicide through one of his folk songs. It also stars Geetanjali Kulkarni, Pradeep Joshi and Shirish Pawar.

The film's music was composed by Sambhaji Bhagat while Mrinal Desai and Rikhav Desai served as its cinematographer and editor, respectively. Tamhane was curious to see the difference between the real courtrooms and the way they were depicted in films. He wanted to explore the "judicial nightmare" in an Indian setting after coming across several real-life cases. His friend Vivek Gomber agreed to produce the film and also acted in it. The crew consisted of newcomers and the actors were non-professionals. There are four languages spoken in the film: Marathi, Hindi, Gujarati and English. Most of the dialogue is in Marathi as it is set in Maharashtra. Laws are read out in English. The defense lawyer is a Gujarati and speaks Gujarati language.

Court premiered at the 71st Venice International Film Festival in 2014, where it won the Best Film in the Horizons category and the Luigi De Laurentiis award for Tamhane. The film went on to win 18 other awards at several film festivals. It premiered in India at the International competition section of the 2014 Mumbai Film Festival and was released theatrically on 17 April 2015. Upon release, the film received critical acclaim and went on to win the National Film Award for Best Feature Film at the 62nd National Film Awards.

== Plot ==
Narayan Kamble is a teacher, social activist and protest singer. He is arrested on the charge of prompting Vasudev Pawar, a manhole worker, to commit suicide. He allegedly committed suicide after being influenced by one of Kamble's protest songs. Lawyer Vinay Vora defends Kamble, who is tried in court and granted bail. Kamble admits to have sung several songs about suicide, but cannot remember if he sang any on the day of the suicide. He also denies any intention to provoke someone to commit suicide. A witness testifies that he saw the manhole worker singing Kamble's song.

On the next hearing of the case, the investigating officer links Kamble with an incarcerated man, Ashwin Bhagat, through a letter, accusing them of planning illegal activity in the city. Vora explains to the court that Bhagat was requesting Kamble to take care of his ailing mother while he was in jail. Nutan, the public prosecutor, informs the court that Kamble possessed two banned books. Vora replies that one book is on Yoga and the other is a critique of certain rituals of the Goyamari sect. Vora is later beaten by some Goyamaris.

Pawar's widow confesses in court that her husband used to clean the manholes without any safety equipment and had lost one eye from exposure to poisonous sewer gases. She further confesses that he was also an alcoholic, but never talked about committing suicide. She denies his intentions of suicide or having heard Kamble's name before. Vora reads the autopsy report which indicates Pawar died as a result of respiratory failure due to inhalation of hydrogen sulphide, with no sign of self-harm. He also says that the witness who testified against Kamble is a stock witness who has been testifying in several other cases.

Considering Kamble's deteriorating health and the lack of evidence, Kamble is granted bail in the amount of ₹100,000 (US$1,000), which Vora pays on his behalf. Kamble is then subsequently arrested on charges of conducting seditious camps under the cover of folk-artist workshops, and is remanded to police custody. Kamble claims the charge and the evidence against him are fabricated and Vora pleads to reconsider the arrest as it will pose a severe risk to Kamble's health; the judge tells Kamble to appeal to the High Court. Later, the judge is shown enjoying a holiday with his family. Some children mischievously shout and wake him from his afternoon slumber, he slaps one of the kids as the rest run away.

== Cast ==
- Vira Sathidar as Narayan Kamble
- Vivek Gomber as Vinay Vora
- Geetanjali Kulkarni as public prosecutor Nutan
- Pradeep Joshi as Judge Sadavarte
- Usha Bane as Sharmila Pawar
- Shirish Pawar as Subodh

== Production ==
=== Development ===
Director Chaitanya Tamhane made a short film called Six Strands at the age of twenty three, which was well received at several international film festivals. The project left him "broke and jobless" and under pressure to earn money, but he did not want to assist another director. Tamhane was watching a "typical" conventional courtroom drama on Doordarshan one day when he thought of making a real courtroom drama and started developing the idea for Court.

Tamhane wanted to explore the "judicial nightmare" in an Indian setting after coming across the case of Jiten Marandi, a cultural activist from Jharkhand. Marandi was arrested as a suspect in the Chilkari massacre, which occurred on 26 October 2007, where nineteen people were killed by Naxalites at a public function. Marandi became a suspect because his name was similar to the actual suspect whom the police could not find. He was arrested and tried, but was released in 2016 after proven not guilty. The action against activist singers of the cultural organisation, Kabir Kala Manch on allegations of links with the left wing also inspired the film's narrative. Tamhane was curious by the idea of a realistic court trial unfolding in a lower court of Mumbai after attending some of them, recalling:

It felt like the complete opposite of what I, as an audience, would expect from a courtroom film; the lawyers were not good orators, the documents were misplaced, the arguments were technical and redundant. I was amused by this setting, and decided to probe further.

— Chaitanya Tamhane in 2014.

Tamhane found the incidents that occur in a lower court to be "bizarre" and saw the potential for drama and humour. Another incident which prompted Tamhane to make the film was when a friend had gone to a police station for document submission and had to wait two hours for a printout because the constable did not know how to connect the cable of the printer.

In 2011, Tamhane met with his friend Vivek Gomber, who he had directed in a theatrical play called Grey Elephants in Denmark in 2009. Tamhane told Gomber that he wanted to write a courtroom drama but did not have the money to finance his project. Gomber then expressed his interest in producing the film and offered to pay him ₹15,000 (US$160) a month to write the script. Tamhane wrote the script in a year after interviewing several lawyers, academics and activists, reading books and newspaper clippings, and discovering "the world of protest music and the legal world". Gomber found the script "very funny", he also mentioned that visiting courts for the film was "quite sad and disheartening".

While Tamhane was writing the script, the character of the public prosecutor was male for a long time and he felt the film was "too male", with all main characters being men. Later, he changed that character to a woman. Tamhane saw Anand Patwardhan's documentary Jai Bhim Comrade (2011), when he was about to finish writing the script and cited it as an "invaluable resource" for the reference of the film. Tamhane had written all the scenes outside the courtroom but lacked the main case until he read about the condition of manhole workers in a Tehelka book, which he incorporated into the script. He also read books of Fali Sam Nariman, V. R. Krishna Iyer and watched Krzysztof Kieślowski's 1966 short film The Office for reference. Tamhane wrote scenes about the domestic lives of the lawyers in the film as he was interested in depicting the kind of life they lived outside the courtroom while also juxtaposing their professional lives with their personal one.

In 2012, Tamhane submitted the script of Court to the National Film Development Corporation of India for financing, but it was rejected. He applied for the Hubert Bals Fund in 2012, given by the International Film Festival Rotterdam where his short film Six Strands was screened in 2011. He received a sum of ₹670,000 (US$7,000) for script and project development. Gomber invested his own money for the remainder of the budget.

=== Casting ===
Court took three years to complete. The film's planning and pre-production was done in a year. The crew had to build court sets as shooting inside a real court is not allowed. Tamhane and casting director Sachit Puranik would sneak into the Bombay High Court and stay there for almost three hours a day. They researched and observed the real protest singers and activists, and made notes for references on the surroundings and costumes.

Tamhane did not want to make the film in a "conventional manner" and hence opted to have newcomers for the cast and crew. It was the first film for much of its crew, including the production designers, editor and casting director. The film's cinematographer, Mrinal Desai, had a documentary background. Tamhane had previously worked with the film's production designers, Pooja Talreja and Somnath Pal, on his play Grey Elephants in Denmark. Tamhane chose to work with mostly newcomers as he did not wish to have anybody from a Bollywood background: "we wanted people with hunger and passion who would go out of their way to get things done." The film also features first time actors like Pradeep Joshi, Usha Bane and Shirish Pawar.

Vira Sathidar, the editor of Marathi magazine Vidrohi, was cast in role of Narayan Kamble just three weeks before the shoot. Gomber played the role of a defence lawyer and was selected after auditioning for the part. The rest of the cast were also selected after auditions including Geetanjali Kulkarni, who is an alumnus of the National School of Drama. The auditions were conducted over the course of nine months with nearly 1,800 people auditioning for several roles. Tamhane borrowed the idea of using non-professional actors from the Iranian filmmaker Abbas Kiarostami. According to him, 80 percent of the cast were non-professional actors who had not been filmed before. Tamhane and his crew members went to banks, railway offices, schools, tea sellers, snack vendors, auto and taxi drivers, and asked people if they would like to act in the film.

=== Filming ===
Court was shot in 45 days and recorded in sync sound. The entire film was shot without camera movements and background score for a realistic feel. Tamhane and Desai chose real locations in Mumbai for shooting the film based on their look and feel and decided not to tamper with them. He decided to shoot long takes with no cuts and scripted lines in a controlled manner. Scenes involving the non-professional actors were shot in 30–35 takes on an average and some scenes even took 60 takes to shoot because of the actors inexperience. Only one scene per day was shot due to the long takes that were done without any cuts or improvisations.

Kulkarni followed a real prosecutor's body language, mannerism and manner of speaking. A scene in the film showed a public prosecutor cross-examining the accused, which is not allowed in real trials. Tamhane said that this was a deliberate decision as he had taken "creative liberty" to avoid "hampering the narrative of the film". He also expressed his interest towards the essence of a scene instead of its technical detail.

During production, members of the Anti-Terrorism Squad came on the sets claiming that there was a Naxalite from Nagpur in the film and searched for him. Sathidar was from Nagpur and, like his character, was a human rights activist thereby making him, according to Tamhane, "politically involved". The crew hid him as he had not finished shooting the film's main sequences, and they were worried that his arrest would prevent the film's completion. The ATS had mistaken Sathidar for a Naxalite.

== Themes ==
When asked about whether Court is an actual depiction of the Indian judiciary or an exaggerated one, Tamhane said: "[the film] actually talks about the people who comprise the system; the people who run the system and the structural and human failings in not just the Indian judiciary but any institution, or any kind of a place with power dynamics." According to him, the film also highlights the aspect of immigrants snatching the jobs of locals in Mumbai. Court also has elements of black comedy, like a scene where one of Vora's speeches is interrupted by a man putting a pedestal fan. A critic from The New Republic called the film a welcome addition to critiques of the judiciary and favorably compared it to the novels Bleak House (1853) and The Trial (1925). He elaborated that the absurdity of the case is similar to The Trial.

Baradwaj Rangan stated in his review that the film is about "teeming metropolis". He also noted the contrasting lives of Vora and Nutan, where one lives alone, speaks fluent English and drives a car; the other has a family, does not speak fluent English and uses public transport. Through this analysis, Rangan says that the film shows how people despite being from different genders, classes and ethnicities "converge in court."

The film is multilingual, with four languages spoken in it: English, Hindi, Gujarati and Marathi. Most of the dialogues are in Marathi as it is set in Maharashtra and the laws are read out in English. The defence lawyer is a Gujarati and speaks Gujarati language. The Marathi lawyers for the prosecution speak in Marathi and English. Since the Gujarati lawyer does not understand Marathi, they speak with him in Hindi. Tamhane said: "Court is set in Mumbai where people speak all four languages, so it was natural to keep that in the film."

== Premiere and release ==
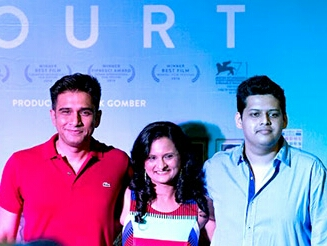
Gomber, Kulkarni, and Tamhane at the film's trailer launch, 2015

Both Tamhane and Gomber had been applying to film festivals from March 2014 and were rejected by the Cannes Film Festival, Locarno International Film Festival and San Sebastián International Film Festival. Court later had its world premiered at the 71st Venice International Film Festival. The film was screened at several festivals after its premiere including the Auteur Film Festival Serbia, the Washington DC South Asian Film Festival, Kyiv International Film Festival "Molodist", Minsk International Film Festival, Singapore International Film Festival, International Antalya Film Festival, BFI London Film Festival, Vienna International Film Festival, Hong Kong Asian Film Festival, Buenos Aires International Festival of Independent Cinema, FICUNAM International Film Festival and 2morrow Film Festival.

Court was acquired by Artscope Films of French producer-distributor-sales agent Memento Films in late August 2014, after producer Alexa Rivero saw the film. In December 2014, they sold the film in four countries: Canada, Greece, the Middle East, and Hong Kong. On 3 February 2015, American independent film distributor Zeitgeist Films announced that they had acquired the film for exhibition in the United States. It had its US premiere at the 44th edition of the New Directors/New Films Festival at New York City on 18 March 2015. Ron Mann, a Canadian documentary filmmaker, who was one of the jury members at the Venice Film Festival, acquired the Canadian distribution rights for the film.

The film premiered in India at the international competition section of the 2014 Mumbai Film Festival. It was released independently by Gomber's Zoo Entertainment Pvt Ltd, with the assistance of Long Live Cinema. A 33-second teaser of the film was launched on 13 March 2015. It was followed by the launch of its theatrical trailer on 23 March 2015. The Central Board of Film Certification gave Tamhane a choice to cut or mute a dialogue from the film, which he decided to mute. The film was released theatrically in India on 17 April 2015, across 150 screens in Maharashtra and select metro cities. It was made on a budget of ₹35 million (US$360,000) and collected an estimate of $22,898 domestically and $57,416 overseas. Court was released on DVD on 16 December 2015. The film was selected as India's official submission for the 88th Academy Awards in the Best Foreign Language Film category, but was not nominated.

== Reception ==
=== India ===
Court received mostly positive response from critics upon release. Mayank Shekhar described it as an "anti-genre film" and a "deeply humanistic account" of those who "comprise the system". He also listed it as his favourite Indian film of the year. Firstpost's Deepanjana Pal called the film "ludicrous, hilarious, and heartbreaking." Meenakshi Shedde reviewing for Mid-Day, wrote: "Apart from highlighting our antiquated laws, Tamhane's strength lies in his even-handedness: he humanises and empathises with his protagonists, even as he lampoons them." Shubhra Gupta, writing for The Indian Express, gave the film four stars out of five, calling it an "unmissable film" and "the best you will see this year". Rajeev Masand praised the "Kafkaesque absurdity", the dark humour and realism of the film: "Compelling and all-too relevant, Court punches you hard in the gut. No rating can do this film justice." Anupama Chopra, in her positive review, wrote: "It's a lot to say in one film but Tamhane, who also wrote the film, does it with impressive economy and elegance."

Suhani Singh of India Today called it the "finest film of 2015 so far", further writing: "Assuredly directed and intelligently written by debutant Chaitanya Tamhane, Court is a riveting watch." Saibal Chatterjee of NDTV cited the film as an "exceptional cinematic achievement". Renuka Vyavahare of The Times of India, mentioned in her review: "[Court ] breaks the stereotypes in the most understated manner to give you the biting reality of our country's flawed judicial system". Writing for Reuters, Shilpa Jamkhandikar termed it as a rare film "that creates drama out of the humdrum lives of ordinary people, whose limited world view and biases affect the lives of others in more ways than they can imagine." A review carried by Suparna Sharma of Deccan Chronicle wrote: "Court doesn't caricature our reality, nor does it harangue us with prescriptive chalk talk. It simply trains its lens on real-life parody as it plays out and shows us our world as is, without exaggeration or artifice." Anuj Kumar of The Hindu found the film to be "an accomplished piece of work". Surabhi Redkar of Koimoi called it the "best representation of a court room drama so far in India".

Contrary to the positive responses, some critics were concerned with the non-professional actors and the western treatment of the film. Raja Sen felt that the film was "better in parts than as a whole". He also pointed out the problem with the non-professional extras: "A constant problem with Court, however, lies in just how ghastly the film's extras are, with almost every person in a non-speaking role doing a jarringly bad job." Baradwaj Rangan felt that the "western eye" was evident in the filmmaking, with its wide shots: "In the absence of camera movement, we rely on other things to enliven the frames – people crossing roads and walking past doors, traffic on streets, the fluttering of paper flags above a stage, a boy practicing on Roman Rings."

=== Overseas ===
On the review aggregator website Rotten Tomatoes, 98% of 61 critics' reviews are positive, with an average rating of 7.8/10. The website's consensus reads: "Court takes a penetrating, timely look at issues facing Indian society while serving as an excellent calling card for debuting writer-director Chaitanya Tamhane." Metacritic, which uses a weighted average, assigned the film a score of 83 out of 100, based on 12 critics, indicating "universal acclaim".

Jay Weissberg of Variety wrote: "Managing to be both extremely rational and extremely humane, the film works so well thanks to an intelligent, superbly understated script and a feel for naturalism that extends beyond mere performance." Neil Young of The Hollywood Reporter stated that the film was a "compellingly clear-eyed indictment of modern-day India's institutional dysfunction". Reviewing for Le Monde, Jacques Mandelbaum called it "a major movie on the worrying state of freedom of speech in the Indian democracy" and praised the "intelligence and sensitivity" of Tamhane. In his positive review of the film, Mike McCahill of The Guardian complimented Tamhane: "Here's a film-maker training a sharp, prosecutorial eye on those harsh homefront realities Bollywood has traditionally permitted audiences to escape."

Stephen Holden, writing for The New York Times, gave a positive review to the film and wrote: "The wheels of justice grind slowly and mercilessly in Court, Chaitanya Tamhane's quiet, devastating critique of the antiquated Indian legal system." Laya Maheshwari of RogerEbert.com called it a "masterpiece" and "one of the best films of the year". She also noted that it offered none of the tropes of a courtroom drama. Tara Brady of The Irish Times deemed the film to be a "magnificent, maddening drama" and said that the film reminded her of Satyajit Ray. Ken Guidry of IndieWire mentioned in his review that Court "borders on brilliance" at times, adding: "Often, it's not about what's happening in the scene, but the implications behind it."

== Accolades ==
Court won 18 awards in its screening at several film festivals. At the 62nd National Film Awards, the film won Best Feature Film Award. It received the Orizzonti Award and the Luigi De Laurentiis (English: Lion of the Future) award at its premiere at the 71st Venice International Film Festival. At its Indian premiere at the 16th Mumbai Film Festival, Court was awarded the Golden Gateway of India for Best Film in the International Competition section and a Special Jury Mention for the cast. It won the Siyad International Feature Film Award at the 51st International Antalya Golden Orange Film Festival, the FIPRESCI Award at the 52nd Vienna International Film Festival, the New Talent Award at the Hong Kong Asian Film Festival, The Best Picture and Best Screenplay Award at the 2morrow Film Festival, Best Film at Listapad, and the FIPRESCI Prize and Best Actor for Gomber at the Buenos Aires International Festival of Independent Cinema. It also went on to win the Best Film Award and Best Director Award for Tamhane at the Singapore International Film Festival, the Grand Prix and FIPRESCI Prize at the Auteur Film Festival, and special mentions at the Kyiv International Film Festival "Molodist" and FICUNAM International Film Festival. Geetanjali Kulkarni Won Filmfare Critics Award for Best Actress – Marathi.

== See also ==
- List of submissions to the 88th Academy Awards for Best Foreign Language Film
- List of Indian submissions for the Academy Award for Best Foreign Language Film
