= Raam Reddy =

Film director

- Born: Karnataka, India
- Education: Prague Film School; St. Stephen's College, Delhi
- Occupations: Director, Writer, Photographer
- Years active: 1989-present
- Relatives: K. C. Reddy, Anita Reddy

Raam Reddy is an Indian film director, writer, and photographer known for his debut feature film Thithi (2015). The film won the Golden Leopard in the "Filmmakers of the Present" category and the First Feature Award at the 68th Locarno International Film Festival.

== Early life ==
After graduating from St. Stephen's College, Delhi, Raam Reddy went on to study Film Direction at Prague Film School.

== Filmography ==
Year	Film	Language	Notes
2013	Ika	Telugu	Short film
2015	Thithi	Kannada	Directorial debut
2024	The Fable	English; Hindi	
