= Anita Reddy =

Indian social worker

- Born: Chennai, Tamil Nadu, India
- Occupation: Social worker
- Children: 3, including Raam Reddy
- Awards: Padma Shri; Mahila Sadhaki Award; Jean Harris Award; Woman Achiever Award; Namma Bengaluru Award; PRSI Award; Kempegowda Award; Lifetime Achievement Award -TANA
- Website: Official web site

Anita Reddy is an Indian social worker from Karnataka and the founder of Association for Voluntary Action and Services (AVAS), known for her services for the rehabilitation and upliftment of the slum dwellers in Karnataka and Andhra Pradesh. She is the managing trustee of DWARAKA and DRIK Foundations, working for children's education and women's livelihoods. The Government of India honored Anita Reddy in 2011, with the fourth highest civilian award of Padma Shri.

== Biography ==
I had to face the land mafia and persons with vested interests. Once, I was even chased by a mob of around 300 people. I had to learn to conduct meetings with slum dwellers in graveyards, says Reddy, about her early experiences in slums of Bengaluru.

Reddy was born in Chennai, Tamil Nadu in a wealthy family of Ranjini Reddy and Dwaraknath Reddy, an industrialist and philanthropist. Her schooling was at the Rishi Valley School in Andhra Pradesh and college in WCC, after which she went to California, USA. Later she married her childhood friend, Pratap Reddy, the son of the first Chief Minister of Karnataka, K. Chengalaraya Reddy.

Her social career started in the late 1970s when she started working with slum residents. Soon, she founded the Association for Voluntary Action and Services (AVAS) in 1980. Her first initiative was to contribute to the living conditions in the slums by remodeling the housing facilities. Reddy's activities gathered momentum when her father founded the Dwarakanath Reddy Ramanarpanam Trust (DRRT) in 1996, bestowed his wealth to the trust and asked Reddy to manage it. With added resources, Reddy worked for the empowerment of the poor people and establishment of better facilities in the slums.

Another achievement credited to Reddy is the formation of the Development of Weavers and Rural Artisans in Kalamkari Art (DWARAKA), a society for the artisans. The society aims to revive the dying art form of Kalamkari and provide the artisans a base for storing and marketing their products. The next project Reddy plans for is the setting up of a leadership development institute, under the Dwarakanath Reddy Institutes for Knowledge (DRIK), for which she has set up a 40-acre piece of land at Chikballapur called the DRIK VIVEKA campus. The institute promotes theatre, music, sports, art and craft and Gandhian studies, for the poor under the cultural empowerment network called DRIK-Jeevanotsava.

Reddy represented the Government of India at the Habitat II, the United Nations Human Settlements Conference in Istanbul, Turkey held from 3 to 14 June 1996 and the UN Conference held in Kenya as a part of the Year Of The Shelterless. She sat on the Housing Task Force set up by the Government of Karnataka for submitting a report on the housing for the urban poor and was a member of the Karnataka Slum Clearance Board. She also holds the positions of the Managing Trustee of the Ranjini Dwaraknath Reddy Trust (RDRT) and the trustee of the Karnataka chapter of Sarvodaya.

Reddy also promotes Jeevanotsav, a cultural platform and the K. C. Reddy Swim Centre in Bengaluru which has produced national level swimmers such as Nisha Millet and Meghana Narayanan, She serves as the Organizing Secretary of Women’s Voice and as the secretary of the State Level Slum Dwellers Federation (KKNSS). She also organizes School based campaigns and dialogues.

In her current role, she is steering the idea of establishing ARC – Arts, Rights and Communities, first-ever learning center that would enhance indigenous traditions and heritage knowledge in poor children in many communities including Government schools. It would enable youth to discover the inherent strengths of the area they live in and the wealth of history relevant for the regions development.

== Awards and recognitions ==
Reddy is a recipient of Mahila Sadhaki Award of the Guild of Women Achievers in 1997. A recipient of the Jean Harris Award from Rotary International and the Woman Achiever Award from the Ladies Circle India, she was declared as the Person of the Year by the Namma Bengaluru Foundation in 2010–11. The same year, in 2011, Reddy received the fourth highest Indian civilian award of Padma Shri.
