= Chaitanya Tamhane =

Indian filmmaker (born 1987)

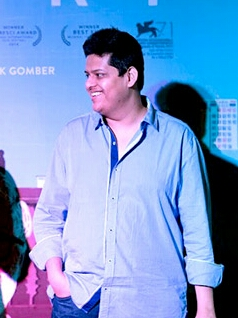
- Tamhane at the trailer launch of Court, 2015
- Born: 1 March 1987 (age 39); Mumbai, Maharashtra, India
- Occupations: Writer; Producer; Director

Chaitanya Tamhane (born 1 March 1987) is an Indian filmmaker, known for the 2014 Marathi courtroom drama Court. It was announced as India's official submission for the 88th Academy Awards in the Best Foreign Language Film category. The film examines the Indian legal system through the trial of an aging folk singer in a lower court in Mumbai.

Court is Tamhane's directorial debut for a feature length film. His previous work includes the short film Six Strands, of which he was also the writer and director, as well as producer. For Court, Tamhane was nominated for best screenwriter at the 9th Asian Film Awards and won best director at the 16th Mumbai Film Festival, among many other awards and honors. In 2018, Tamhane served as the creative producer for the Kannada film Balekempa.

Tamhane's second directorial feature, The Disciple (2020) premiered at the 77th Venice International Film Festival. At Venice, the film won FIPRESCI award presented by the International Federation of Film Critics (FIPRESCI, short for Federation Internationale de la Presse Cinematographique) and the Best Screenplay award.

Tamhane participated in the Rolex Mentor and Protégé Arts Initiative, he was the protégé of Alfonso Cuarón during the filming of Roma, this resulted in Cuarón being the Executive Producer of The Disciple

== Filmography ==
Year	Title	Credited as			Notes
Year	Title	Director	Writer	Producer	Notes
2011	Six Strands	Yes	Yes	Yes	Short film
2014	Court	Yes	Yes	No	
2017	Death of a Father	No	No	Yes	Short film; also creative director
2020	The Disciple	Yes	Yes	No	Also editor

As producer only

- Balekempa (2018) – Consulting producer

== Awards ==
- Best Feature Film Court at 62nd National Film Awards, 2015
- Best Film Court at Buenos Aires International Festival of Independent Cinema, 2015.
- Best Asian Feature Film, Court at Singapore International Film Festival, Silver Screen Awards 2014
- Best Screenplay, The Disciple at 77th Venice International Film Festival.
- FIPRESCI Award for The Disciple at 77th Venice International Film Festival.
- Best Screenplay, The Disciple at 15th Asian Film Awards 2021
