= 2023 in Canadian television =

The following is a list of events affecting Canadian television in 2023. Events listed include television show debuts, finales, cancellations, and channel launches, closures and rebrandings.

== Events ==
=== February ===
| Date | Event | Source |
|---|---|---|
| 16 | David Cochrane is named the new host of CBC News Network's daily political talk show Power & Politics, following the departure of Vassy Kapelos, who joined CTV News. | |

=== March ===
| Date | Event | Source |
|---|---|---|
| 27 | After over 25 years on the air, Teletoon rebranded to Cartoon Network Canada. The existing Cartoon Network channel was concurrently relaunched as Boomerang Canada, returning to a classic animation format since the closure of Teletoon Retro in September 2015. The Teletoon branding continues to be used for the Teletoon+ streaming service and its French-language feed. | |

=== June ===
| Date | Event | Source |
|---|---|---|
| 27 | Eastlink removes the specialty channels owned by Corus Entertainment, after being unable to reach a carriage agreement. Corus said that other TV service providers will continue to carry their specialty channels. | |

=== August ===
| Date | Event | Source |
|---|---|---|
| 31 | Natyf TV, a channel which had operated since 2018 as a discretionary service with little distribution outside of Montreal, is granted a must-carry order ensuring that it will be available on all cable distribution services in Quebec. | |

=== September ===
| Date | Event | Source |
|---|---|---|
| 5 | Citytv announces Meredith Shaw as the new co-host of Breakfast Television, following the departure of Dina Pugliese from the program earlier in the year. | |

=== October ===
| Date | Event | Source |
|---|---|---|
| 1 | After 35 years on the air, Bell Media's specialty channel Vrak shuts down. The reason for the channel's shutdown is for Bell to concentrate on its top-performing, most popular specialty channels. | |

=== November ===
| Date | Event | Source |
|---|---|---|
| 13 | CTV launches an early 5:30 p.m. edition of CTV National News, to be anchored by Sandie Rinaldo. | |

== Programs ==
=== Programs debuting in 2023 ===
| Start date | Show | Channel | Source |
|---|---|---|---|
| January 5 | LOL: Qui rira le dernier? | Amazon Prime Video | |
| January 6 | Stuff the British Stole | CBC | |
| January 10 | Virage: Double faute | Noovo | |
| January 11 | L'Empereur | Noovo | |
| January 12 | Bollywed | CBC Television | |
| January 17 | Wong & Winchester | Citytv | |
| February 4 | Rubble & Crew | Treehouse TV/StackTV | |
| February 9 | Mégantic | Club Illico | |
| February 10 | The Spencer Sisters | CTV | |
| February 16 | Canada's Ultimate Challenge | CBC Television | |
| February 17 | Thunder Bay | Crave | |
| February 24 | Push | CBC Television | |
| February 27 | Plan B | CBC Television | |
| March 6 | Shelved | CTV | |
| March 8 | Désobéir: Le Choix de Chantal Daigle | Crave | |
| March 8 | Ness Murby: Transcending | AMI-tv | |
| March 19 | Essex County | CBC Television | |
| March 19 | Sullivan's Crossing | CTV | |
| March 26 | Builder Brothers Dream Factory | Treehouse TV | |
| April 1 | Evolving Vegan | CTV Life Channel | |
| April 1 | Streams Flow from a River | Super Channel | |
| April 10 | Popularity Papers | YTV | |
| April 14 | Sew Fierce | OutTV | |
| April 20 | Red Ketchup | Adult Swim | |
| May 2 | Lac-Mégantic: This Is Not an Accident | Vrai | |
| May 9 | Little Big Community | APTN | |
| May 17 | Bush Wreck Rescue | Discovery | |
| May 17 | Sisters | Crave | |
| May 24 | Good Morning Chuck (Or the Art of Harm Reduction) (Bon matin Chuck, ou l'art de réduire les méfaits) | Crave | |
| May 26 | Little Bird | Crave | |
| May 28 | Farming for Love | CTV | |
| June 16 | Billionaire Murders | Crave | |
| June 19 | Battle of the Generations | CTV | |
| July 7 | The Dessert | Crave | |
| September 4 | Aunty B's House | CBC Kids | |
| September 5 | The Good Stuff with Mary Berg | CTV | |
| September 17 | Telling Our Story | CBC Television | |
| September 20 | Bones of Crows | CBC Television | |
| September 23 | I Have Nothing | Crave | |
| September 24 | Black Community Mixtapes | Citytv | |
| September 27 | Robyn Hood | Global | |
| October 2 | The Traitors Canada | CTV | |
| October 6 | Paranormal Revenge | CTV Sci-Fi Channel | |
| October 13 | Bria Mack Gets a Life | Crave | |
| October 16 | Listing Large | CTV Life Channel | |
| October 18 | Black Life: Untold Stories | CBC Television | |
| November 9 | BlackBerry | CBC Television | |
| November 16 | Temps de chien | Ici TOU.TV | |
| November 22 | Swan Song | CBC Television | |

=== Programs ending in 2023 ===
| End date | Show | Channel | First aired | Status | Source |
|---|---|---|---|---|---|
| March 8 | Pretty Hard Cases | CBC Television | 2021 | Ended | |
| March 28 | Workin' Moms | CBC Television | 2017 | Ended | |
| June 9 | The Marilyn Denis Show | CTV | 2011 | Ended | |
| October 6 | Entertainment Tonight Canada | Global | 2005 | Ended | |
| December 8 | Sort Of | CBC Television | 2021 | Ending | |
| December 25 | Letterkenny | Crave | 2016 | Ending | |

=== Specials ===
| Start date | Show | Channel | Source |
|---|---|---|---|
| February 20 | Life with Luca | Family Channel | |
| March 13 | Juno Awards of 2023 | CBC Television | |
| April 16 | 11th Canadian Screen Awards | CBC Television | |
| May 12 | I'm Sandie Rinaldo | CTV | |
| September 16 | 2023 Canadian Country Music Awards | CTV | |
| November 19 | 110th Grey Cup | TSN | |
| December 10 | 25th Quebec Cinema Awards | Noovo | |

== Networks and services ==
=== Network conversions and rebrandings ===
| Old network name | New network name | Type | Conversion date | Notes |
|---|---|---|---|---|
| Teletoon (English feed) | Cartoon Network Canada | Cable/satellite | March 27 | |
| Cartoon Network (original) | Boomerang Canada | Cable/satellite | March 27 | |

=== Closures ===
| Network | Type | Closure date | Notes |
|---|---|---|---|
| A.Side TV | Cable/satellite | January 15 | |
| Vrak | Cable/satellite | October 1 | |
| ESPN Classic | Cable/satellite | October 31 | |

== Deaths ==
| Date | Name | Age | Notes | Source |
|---|---|---|---|---|
| February 25 | Gordon Pinsent | 92 | Actor (various Canadian series including The Forest Rangers, Quentin Durgens, M.P., Street Legal, Due South, and Republic of Doyle) | |
| March 21 | Charles E. Bastien | 60 | Animation director (Pelswick, PAW Patrol) | |
| May 5 | Pauline Newstone | 79 | Voice actress for Ocean Productions 1973-2020. | |
| May 14 | Samantha Weinstein | 28 | Actress (TV roles including XPM and Alias Grace, voice work on such animated series as D.N. Ace and Dino Ranch) | |
| June 28 | Sue Johanson | 93 | Sex educator and host of Sunday Night Sex Show on W Network | |
| August 17 | Rick Jeanneret | 81 | Hockey announcer for the Buffalo Sabres | |
| September 7 | Peter C. Newman | 94 | Journalist, documentary writer (The Canadian Establishment, Titans) | |
| October 28 | Matthew Perry | 54 | Canadian-born actor and comedian best known for his work in American series (prominent roles included Chandler Bing on Friends and Oscar Madison on The Odd Couple, both simulcast in Canada) | |

== See also ==
- List of Canadian films of 2023
