= Tracey Erin Smith =

Canadian theatre director

Tracey Erin Smith is a Canadian theatre director, television host, creator, co-producer and bestselling author of the book Flying SOULO. She is most noted as the creator of SOULO Theatre, a theatrical process which helps writers and performers to create and launch solo stage shows based on their personal experiences. Smith is also known as the creator and host of the award-winning documentary series Drag Heals.

Programs offered through SOULO Theatre have also included drag training classes, such as the drag king workshop "Dude for a Day", which educate novice drag performers in the art. These led to the launch of the documentary series Drag Heals in 2018, with Smith as host.

She received a Canadian Screen Award nomination for Best Host in a Lifetyle Program or Series at the 12th Canadian Screen Awards in 2024, for Drag Heals.

She is the partner of theatre director Sarah Garton Stanley, a former artistic director of Buddies in Bad Times, currently the vice-president of programming at Arts Commons.
