= Drag Heals =

Canadian reality television series

Drag Heals is a Canadian reality television series, which premiered in 2018 on OutTV. Created and hosted by Tracey Erin Smith, co-hosted by Dale Edwards (aka Vicki Lix), directed by Charlie David, and produced by Border2Border, the series centres on a group of aspiring drag performers learning the craft in Canada's only "drag school" program. The participants work with Smith and weekly guest coaches to learn the process and craft of drag performance, before giving their own debut performances in a group drag show at Toronto's Buddies in Bad Times theatre.

The series includes both drag queens and drag kings. It grew out of Smith's existing drag training programs, Dude for a Day and Project Drag Queen.

The series premiered on OutTV in 2018. A second season went into production in 2019, and aired in 2020. Season 3 aired in 2023.

The series received two Canadian Screen Award nominations at the 12th Canadian Screen Awards in 2024, for Best Lifestyle Series and Best Host in a Lifestyle Series (Smith).
