= How to Fail as a Popstar =

Canadian web series

- Genre: Comedy
- Starring: Chris D'Silva; Adrian Pavone; Ayesha Mansur Gonsalves; Nadine Bhabha; Arwen Humphreys; Eric Johnson; Vanessa Matsui; Aayushma Sapkota
- Country of origin: Canada
- Original language: English

Original release
- Network: CBC Gem
- Release: October 2023

How to Fail as a Popstar is a Canadian comedy web series, which premiered on CBC Gem in 2023. Adapted from Vivek Shraya's stage play and subsequent book of the same name, the series dramatizes Shraya's early attempt at becoming a pop music star in the 2000s before finding greater success as a writer.

The series stars Chris D'Silva as Shraya in childhood and Adrian Pavone as Shraya in young adulthood, with Shraya personally narrating and appearing to her younger selves in dream sequences. The supporting cast includes Ayesha Mansur Gonsalves, Nadine Bhabha, Arwen Humphreys, Eric Johnson, Vanessa Matsui and Aayushma Sapkota. Matsui was also the director of the series.

According to Shraya, the idea behind the play, book and series adaptation was to normalize talking about failure, an experience that many people share but which is rarely depicted in scripted entertainment. Concurrently with the series premiere, Shraya also released an album of music from the series, including both older tracks recorded during that era of her life and newer songs.

The series had a theatrical preview screening at the 2023 Calgary International Film Festival, in advance of its CBC Gem premiere in October 2023.

== Awards ==
Award	Date of ceremony	Category	Work	Result	Ref(s)
Canadian Screen Awards	2024	Best Original Program or Series, Fiction	Elise Cousineau, Caroline Habib, Laura Perlmutter, Bruno Dubé, Jennifer Kawaja, Vanessa Matsui, Vivek Shraya	Won	
Canadian Screen Awards	2024	Best Lead Performance in a Web Program or Series	Adrian Pavone	Nominated	
Canadian Screen Awards	2024	Best Supporting Performance in a Web Program or Series	Nadine Bhabha	Nominated	
Canadian Screen Awards	2024	Picture Editing in a Web Program or Series	Tiffany Beaudin, Pauline Decroix	Nominated	
Canadian Screen Awards	2024	Writing in a Web Program or Series	Vivek Shraya, "The Producer"	Won	
