= Less Than Kosher =

- Directed by: Daniel Am Rosenberg
- Starring: Shaina Silver-Baird; David Reale; David Eisner
- Music by: Ari Posner
- Country of origin: Canada
- No. of seasons: 1
- No. of episodes: 7

Production
- Executive producers: Avi Federgreen; Michael Goldlist; Shaina Silver-Baird
- Producers: Emily Andrews; Laura Nordin
- Editor: Ben Lee Allan

Less Than Kosher is Canadian comedy web series, which premiered in 2023 on Highball TV. The series stars Shaina Silver-Baird as Viv, a self-professed "bad Jew" who moves back into her parents' home after failing to make it as a pop singer, and unexpectedly ends up working as a cantor at her local synagogue.

The series was screened theatrically as a film at a number of Jewish film festivals, before premiering on Highball in web series format.

== Plot summary ==
Viv (Silver-Baird) is stuck in a rut. Her once-promising pop career is failing, her gigs are drying up and she's had to move back to her family home in Toronto, where she occupies the basement. She has distanced herself from the local Jewish community and Judaism and her mother hasn't forgiven her for walking out on her own Bat Mitzvah. The household is strained by the death of Viv's father several years earlier, and Viv's lack of interest in embracing her mother's second husband, Rajit (Varughese), an Indian Hindu, as her stepdad.

Against her inclination, she agrees to attend a Yom Kippur service with her family. Her singing impresses the congregation, including Rabbi Morris (Eisner). At the synagogue, she also establishes a flirtation with Asher (Reale), the Rabbi's son. Impressed by her vocal skills, Rabbi Morris offers Viv a role at the synagogue as substitute cantor. A reluctant Viv agrees and excels, connecting closer to her Jewish identity.

The growing chemistry between Viv and Asher is complicated by the revelation that Asher is married. Asher's marriage is strained and at his father-in-law's shiva, Viv and Asher kiss. Meanwhile, unbeknownst to Viv, her younger sister, Gabbi (Halili) has been taking TikTok videos of Viv singing Jewish liturgical songs. The videos have gained major traction and Viv is offered an important meeting with a record label in New York City. Viv realises that she has to miss Gabbi's Bat Mitzvah to attend the meeting and she plans to travel to New York with Asher. However, at the airport, she realises that has to be at her sister's side and she arrives unexpectedly at the synagogue and reads the third Aliyah as originally agreed.

== Cast ==
- Shaina Silver-Baird as Viv, a singer that has distanced herself from Judaism and community
- David Reale as Asher, the married son of Rabbi Morris, who develops an attraction towards Viv
- David Eisner as Rabbi Morris, who hires a reluctant Shaina to be a substitute cantor at the synagogue
- Sarah Orenstein as Lillian, Viv's mother
- Sugith Varughese as Rajit, Viv's stepfather, an Indian Hindu
- Arielle Halili as Gabbi, Viv's half-sister
- Vanessa Smythe as Rachel, Asher's wife
- Nadine Djoury as Danielle
- Aisha Evelyna as Billie
- Michael Goldlist as Aaron
- Claire Acott as Melinda
- Tamar Ilanna as Ancestor

== Reception ==
=== Awards ===
The series won four awards at the 2023 T.O. Webfest, including the Grand Prize for Best Web Series and the awards for Best Comedy, Best Writing, and Best Actor in a Canadian Web Series (Silver-Baird).

The series received two Canadian Screen Award nominations at the 12th Canadian Screen Awards in 2024, for Best Original Program or Series, Fiction (Michael Goldlist, Shaina Silver-Baird, Laura Nordin, Emily Andrews) and Best Picture Editing in a Web Program or Series (Ben Lee Allan).
