= Dani Pagliarello =

Director and actor

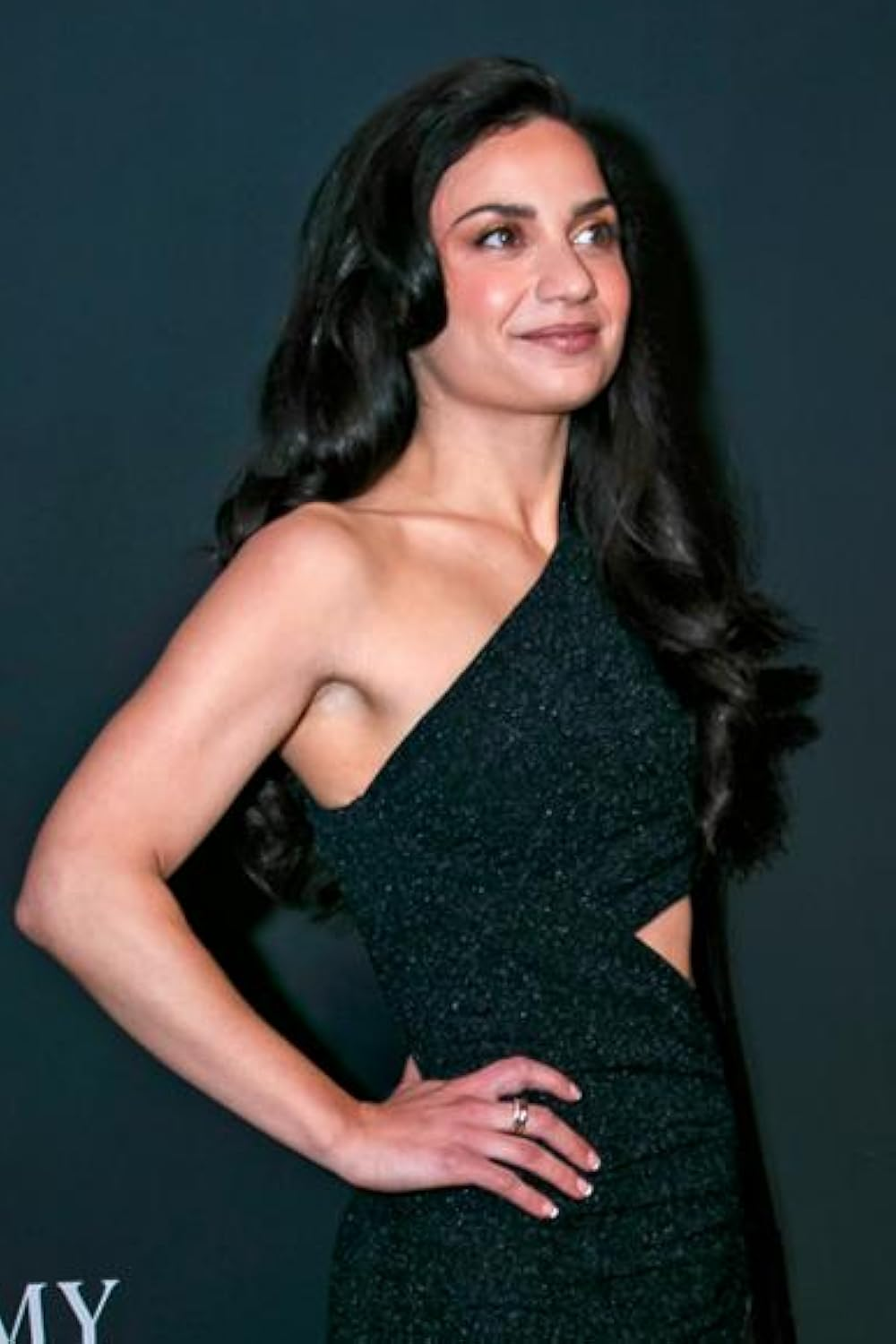
Dani Pagliarello on the red carpet at the Canadian Screen Awards in 2024.

Dani Pagliarello is a Canadian actor, director, writer, producer and two-time Canadian Screen Award nominee. She is the co-show runner and co-creator of The Drop, on Tubi and Amazon Prime. The Drop was created for True West Films and premiered on Narcity Media's YouTube Channel in 2023. She received Best Comedy Director at Rio Webfest alongside collaborator Jordan Canning.

== Education ==
Pagliarello graduated with a Bachelor of Fine Arts from York University's Acting Conservatory.

== Career ==
She has featured in a number of plays, including Bertolt Brecht's The Resistible Rise of Arturo Ui, in which she portrayed Ui., a role which landed her a My Theatre Awards nomination for Best Actress. Pagliarello has had acting roles in Hulu's The Handmaid's Tale, and Paramount+'s upcoming Cross, CBC Gem's Sort Of, and Netflix film Luckiest Girl Alive.

Through The Drop, Pagliarello earned Canadian Screen Award nominations at the 12th Canadian Screen Awards, for Best Series and Best Lead Performance in Web Program or Series and she won Best Comedy Director at Rio Webfest alongside collaborator Jordan Canning. The Drop also won Best Toronto Series at T.O. WebFest.

== Awards and nominations ==
- 2023: Awarded Best Toronto Series for The Drop at T.O. WebFest
