= Keenan Lynch =

Canadian cinematographer

Keenan Lynch is a Canadian cinematographer. He is most noted for his work on the 2022 film Tehranto, for which he received a Canadian Screen Award nomination for Best Cinematography at the 11th Canadian Screen Awards in 2023.

In 2024 he received two CSA nominations for Best Photography in a Documentary Program or Factual Series at the 12th Canadian Screen Awards, for his work on the television series Black Community Mixtapes (with Ashley Iris Gill) and Dark Side of the Ring (with Daniel Tamizian). He and Gill won the award for Black Community Mixtapes.

In 2026 he won the award for Outstanding Cinematography in a Short Film at the Reelworld Film Festival, for his work on the short film Purge.
