= Faran Moradi =

Faran Moradi is an Iranian-Canadian film and television writer and director from London, Ontario. He is most noted for his debut feature film Tehranto, for which he received a Canadian Screen Award nomination for Best Editing at the 11th Canadian Screen Awards in 2023.

He previously directed the short films Broken, Holiday for the Poor, Covert Delivery, Through the Divide and Blackpowder and Guilt, and episodes of the television series Odd Squad and Holly Hobbie.

At the 2022 Forest City Film Festival, he was the winner of the Project Pitch competition for his screenplay Cry Wolf.
