= Black Community Mixtapes =

Black Community Mixtapes is a Canadian documentary-style television series that premiered on September 24, 2023 and aired on the Citytv network. Hosted by KhaRå Martin, the five-part series takes audiences on a historical throwback to the beginnings of Hip Hop culture in Canada. Credited as an Oya Media Group production, the quintet of segments offer a rare glimpse into the Hip Hop mecca City of Toronto of yesteryear -- spanning the late-80s and mid-90s -- through exclusive testimonials shared by some of the pioneering industry figures responsible for making the early contributions that paved the way for acts like Tory Lanz and Drake.

== Episodes ==
1. "Hip Hop"
2. "Toronto Carnival"
3. "Photography"
4. "Literature"
5. "Archivists"

== Cast ==
1. Mark Campbell
2. Dave Clarke
3. Adrien King
4. KhaRå Martin<
5. Wendy Motion Brathwaite
6. Ron Nelson
7. Patrick Nichols
8. Master T
9. Michael Williams

== Awards ==
Award	Date of ceremony	Category	Work	Result	Ref(s)
Canadian Screen Awards	2024	Best Photography in a Documentary Program or Factual Series	Ashley Iris Gill, Keenan Lynch	Won	
Canadian Screen Awards	2024	Best Sound in a Documentary or Factual Program or Series	Bridget Tang, Malcolm Wegg, Derek Brin	Won	
Canadian Screen Awards	2024	Best Direction in a Documentary or Factual Series	Alison Duke, Ngardy Conteh George	Nominated	
Canadian Screen Awards	2024	Best Original Music, Documentary Program or Series	La-Nai Gabriel	Won	
Canadian Screen Awards	2024	Best Writing in a Documentary Program or Series	Alison Duke	Nominated	
