= Alison Duke (filmmaker) =

Canadian filmmaker

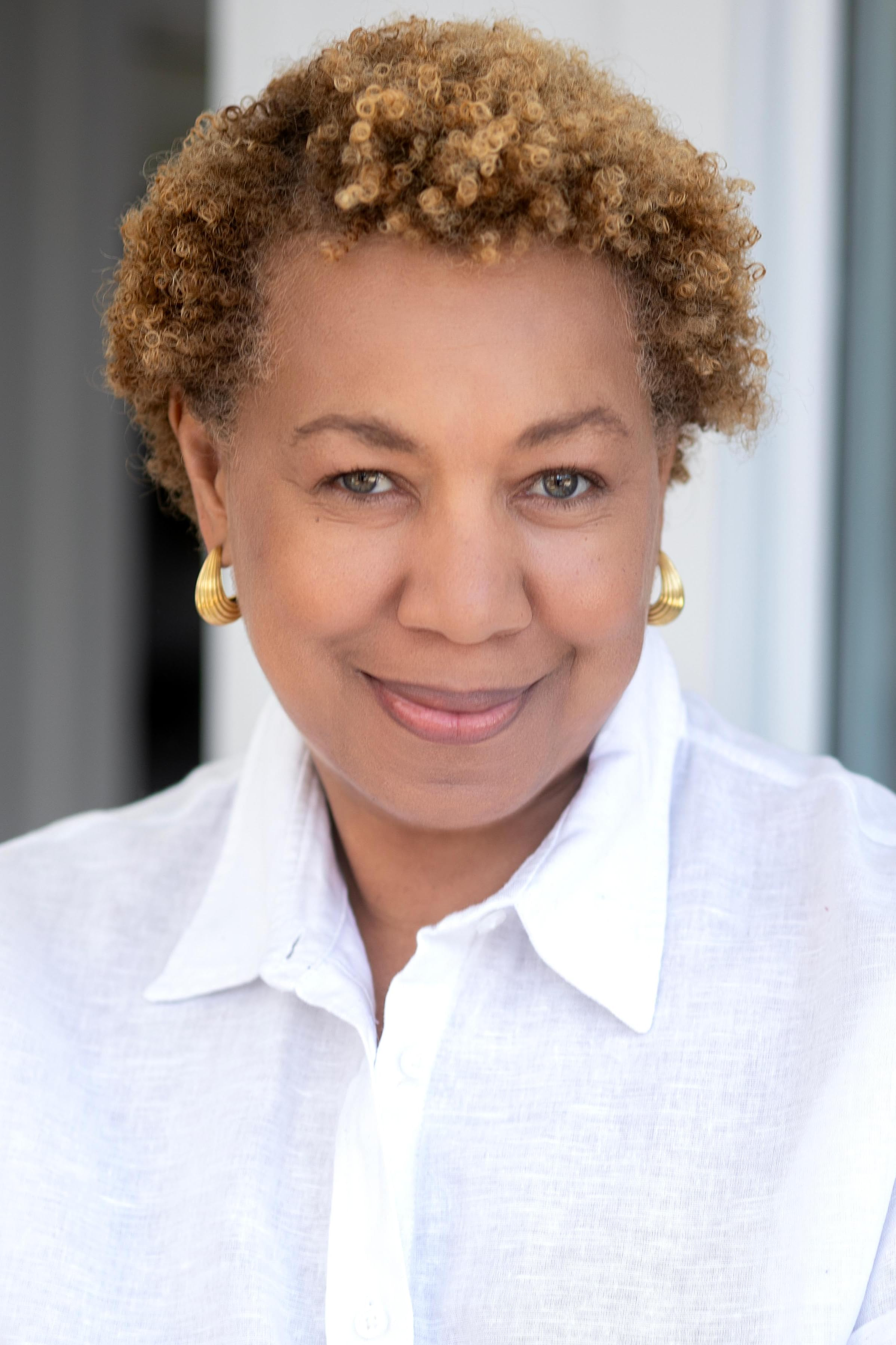
- Citizenship: Canadian
- Education: University of Windsor; York University
- Occupations: Film director, producer, and writer
- Years active: 1996–present
- Notable work: Mr. Jane and Finch – Winston LaRose; 21 Black Futures: The Prescription

Alison Duke is a Canadian film director, producer, and writer. She is the co-founder and director of Oya Media.

== Biography ==
She is a graduate of the University of Windsor from where she earned a master's degree in 1991. She also holds a master's in film production from York University.

Alison started her career in 1996 as a producer and worked for several media outlets including CHUM Television.

In 2001, her first feature film, Raisin' Kane, was released.

In 2018, she founded Oya Media with Ngardy Conteh George.

In 2024 she received two Canadian Screen Award nominations, for Best Direction in a Documentary or Factual Series and Best Writing in a Documentary or Factual Series, at the 12th Canadian Screen Awards for her work on the television series Black Community Mixtapes. She was also named the recipient of the Don Haig Award at the 2024 Hot Docs Canadian International Documentary Festival.

She is queer.

== Filmography ==
- Raisin' Kane (2001)
- A Deathly Silence (2003)
- Mr. Jane and Finch (2019)
- Promise Me (2019)
- 21 Black Futures: The Prescription (2021)
- Any Other Way: The Jackie Shane Story (2024)
- A Mother Apart (2024)
- Bam Bam: The Sister Nancy Story (2024)
- Michelle Ross: Unknown Icon (2025)

== Award and recognition ==
- Donald Brittain Award (2020)
- Mentorship Award presented at the Women in Film & Television-Toronto (WIFT)
