= Tehranto =

2022 Canadian comedy-drama film

- Directed by: Faran Moradi
- Written by: Faran Moradi; Nathan Martinak
- Produced by: Jacqueline de Niverville
- Starring: Sammy Azero; Mo Zeighami; Navid Negahban
- Cinematography: Keenan Lynch
- Edited by: Faran Moradi
- Music by: Jarrid Dudley
- Production companies: 1UTT Productions; Lucent; Nova 9 Pictures
- Release date: March 22, 2022 (CFF)
- Running time: 92 minutes
- Country: Canada
- Languages: English; Persian

Tehranto is a 2022 Canadian romantic comedy-drama film, directed by Faran Moradi. The film stars Sammy Azero and Mo Zeighami as Badi Alavi and Sharon Moridi, university students in the Iranian Canadian community in Toronto, Ontario, who meet and fall in love despite the disapproval of their family and friends.

The cast also includes Navid Negahban, Mahsa Ghorbankarimi, Ali Badshah, Niaz Salimi, Elias Edraki, Farid Yazdani, Sarah Camacho, Kathryn Davis, Farshideh Nasrin, Feraidoon Moradipour, Neil Crone, Travis Nelson, Venus Razzaghi, Dan Abramovici, Neil Affleck and Sahba Kian.

The film premiered as the opening film of the 2022 Canadian Film Festival. It was later screened at the Ottawa Canadian Film Festival, where it won the Audience Favourite award, and at the Cinequest Film & Creativity Festival, where it won the award for Best Feature Narrative: Drama.

The film received two Canadian Screen Award nominations at the 11th Canadian Screen Awards in 2023, for Best Cinematography (Keenan Lynch) and Best Editing (Moradi).
