= Seahorse (2026 film) =

2026 Canadian drama film

- Directed by: Aisha Evelyna
- Written by: Aisha Evelyna
- Produced by: Natalie Remplakowski
- Starring: Aisha Evelyna; Joseph Marcell
- Cinematography: Ian Carleton
- Edited by: Craig Scorgie
- Music by: Kalaisan Kalaichelvan
- Production company: Citrine Productions
- Distributed by: Mongrel Media
- Release date: March 13, 2026 (SXSW)
- Running time: 83 minutes
- Country: Canada
- Language: English

Seahorse is a 2026 Canadian drama film, directed by Aisha Evelyna and released in 2026. The film stars Evelyna as Nola, a young Black Canadian woman working as a sous chef in Toronto, whose efforts to stay in control of her life and career following a mental health crisis are challenged when her estranged father Cyrus (Joseph Marcell), now living as a homeless man on the streets, reenters her life.

The cast also includes Ruth Goodwin, Brett Donahue and Alden Adair in supporting roles.

The film, Evelyna's directorial debut, was shot in Toronto in 2024.

The film premiered on March 13, 2026, at the 2026 South by Southwest Film & TV Festival. It has been acquired for Canadian distribution by Mongrel Media, with commercial release to be announced.

The film won the Jean-Marc Vallée DGC Discovery Award at the Directors Guild of Canada awards in 2026. It is also slated to screen in the Borsos Competition program at the 2026 Whistler Film Festival.
