= Scaring Women at Night =

- Directed by: Karimah Zakia Issa
- Written by: Ace Clamber; Karimah Zakia Issa
- Produced by: Lindsay Blair Goeldner; Rosalind Goodwin
- Starring: Izaiah Dockery; Kavita Musty; Dashawn Lloyd Blackwood
- Cinematography: Ashley Iris Gill
- Edited by: Nicole Sison
- Production companies: Common Good; Fae Pictures
- Release date: September 13, 2022 (TIFF)
- Running time: 11 minutes
- Country: Canada
- Language: English

Scaring Women at Night is a Canadian short drama film, directed by Karimah Zakia Issa and released in 2022. The film stars Izaiah Dockery as Ash, a Black transgender man who is walking alone in the dark, but becomes very nervous that Ella (Kavita Musty), a woman also walking alone nearby, may potentially view him as a threat.

The film premiered in the Short Cuts program at the 2022 Toronto International Film Festival.

== Awards ==
The film was screened at the 2023 Inside Out Film and Video Festival, where Issa won the Emerging Canadian Artist award.

The film won the 2023 Iris Prize for best LGBTQ-themed short film.
