= Ashley Iris Gill =

Canadian cinematographer

Ashley Iris Gill is a Canadian cinematographer. She is most noted for her work on the 2024 documentary film Disco's Revenge, for which she received a Canadian Screen Award nomination for Best Cinematography in a Documentary at the 13th Canadian Screen Awards in 2025.

Her other credits have included the films Patty vs. Patty, Scaring Women at Night, A Mother Apart, Thriving: A Dissociated Reverie and All the Lost Ones, the documentary television series Black Community Mixtapes, and the web series Stories from My Gay Grandparents and My Dead Mom.

Gill and Keenan Lynch previously won a Canadian Screen Award for Best Photography in a Documentary Program or Factual Series at the 12th Canadian Screen Awards in 2024 for Black Community Mixtapes, and Gill won the award for Outstanding Cinematography in a Short Film at the 2023 Reelworld Film Festival for The Future Above Us.

She is out as queer.
