= The Drop (web series) =

Canadian comedy web series

The Drop is a Canadian comedy web series, which premiered on Narcity Media's YouTube channel in 2023. The series stars Aisha Evelyna and Dani Pagliarello as Polly and Zara, two young women who support themselves in the outrageously expensive city of Toronto by launching their own business as professional line-waiters for wealthy clients who want all the latest hot products but are too busy to line up to buy them personally.

The supporting cast includes Danté Prince, Andrew Robinson, Samantha Brown, Aurora Browne, Mark Little, Mishka Thébaud, Nicole Power, Kris Siddiqi, Nigel Downer, Patrick Ronan and Daniel Simpson.

Narcity's first scripted web series, the series was created by Evelyna and Pagliarello for True West Films.

== Episodes ==
No. overall	No. in season	Title	Directed by	Written by	Original release date
1	1	"Preemo"	Jordan Canning	Dani Pagliarello	May 5, 2023
1	2	"Monolith"	Dani Pagliarello	Dani Pagliarello & Aisha Evelyna	May 12, 2023
1	3	"Bottled Air, Trademark"	Aisha Evelyna	Dani Pagliarello & Aisha Evelyna	May 19, 2023
1	4	"Geezers"	Dani Pagliarello & Aisha Evelyna	Aisha Evelyna	May 26, 2023

== Awards ==
The series won the award for Best Toronto Web Series at the 2023 T.O. Webfest. It received five Canadian Screen Award nominations at the 12th Canadian Screen Awards in 2024, for Best Original Program or Series, Fiction (Evelyna, Pagliarello, Elizabeth Yake, Liz Whitmere), Best Lead Performance in a Web Program or Series (2: Evelyna, Pagliarello), Best Supporting Performance in a Web Program or Series (Browne) and Best Direction in a Web Program or Series (Evelyna).
