= The Longest Goodbye =

2023 Canadian-Israeli documentary film

- Film poster
- Directed by: Ido Mizrahy
- Written by: Ido Mizrahy; Nir Sa'ar
- Produced by: Ido Mizrahy; Nir Sa'ar; Paul Cadieux
- Cinematography: Boaz Freund
- Edited by: Anouk Deschênes
- Music by: Ramachandra Borcar
- Production companies: Les Productions Megafun; Restless Pictures
- Distributed by: Greenwich Entertainment
- Release date: January 19, 2023 (Sundance)
- Running time: 87 minutes
- Countries: Canada; Israel
- Language: English

The Longest Goodbye is a Canadian-Israeli documentary film, directed by Ido Mizrahy and released in 2023. The film documents the efforts of handling the possible psychological impact of space travel on astronauts who must spend long periods of time away from family and friends.

The film premiered at the 2023 Sundance Film Festival.

The film received three Canadian Screen Award nominations at the 12th Canadian Screen Awards in 2024, for Best Feature Length Documentary, Best Editing in a Documentary (Anouk Deschênes) and Best Original Music in a Documentary (Ramachandra Borcar).
