= Aisha Evelyna =

Canadian actress and filmmaker

Aisha Evelyna is a Canadian actress and filmmaker, most noted as co-creator and co-star of the comedy web series The Drop.

She was a triple Canadian Screen Award nominee at the 12th Canadian Screen Awards in 2024 for The Drop, in the categories of Best Original Program or Series, Fiction as a producer, Best Lead Performance in a Web Program or Series, and Best Direction in a Web Program or Series.

She has also had acting roles in episodes of Workin' Moms, My Roommate's an Escort, Murdoch Mysteries, Slo Pitch and Less Than Kosher, and has directed the short films Naval Gazing and Alex.

In 2024 she entered production on Seahorse, her feature directorial debut. The film premiered at the SXSW festival in March 2026.
