= I Hate People, People Hate Me =

Canadian television series

I Hate People, People Hate Me is a Canadian comedy web series that premiered on CBC Gem in 2023. The series stars Bobbi Summers and Lily Kazimiera as Jovi and Tabitha, two friends who bond over their shared status as outsiders to the LGBTQ community in Toronto.

Summers described the series as having been inspired by films such as Ghost World, Good Burger and Welcome to the Dollhouse, with the characters' alienation meant as self-reflection on his own struggles. The series was also designed to depict Toronto in a graphic novel sort of way rather than realistically, described by Summers as "filtered through the part of my brain that wants everything to feel like a live-action cartoon with darkness sprinkled on top".

The cast also includes Jennifer Sapico, Jake Simone, Dallas Peplow, Jessica Myrie, Ethan Laniado, Lyndsay Clarkson, Deniella Alexis and Luke Avoledo in supporting roles and Canadian icon Bif Naked as a guest star.

The series premiered globally on WOW Presents Plus in January 2025 and is the streamer's first scripted acquisition. Episode runtimes range from 8–18 minutes.

== Production ==
I Hate People, People Hate Me was produced by LoCo Motion Pictures with Lauren Corber, Lisa Filipelli, Evan Dell'Aquila and Bobbi Summers executive producing and Palmer Baranek as supervising producer.

== Awards ==
Award	Date of ceremony	Category	Work	Result	Ref(s)
Canadian Screen Awards	2024	Best Original Program or Series, Fiction	Lauren Corber, Evan Dell'Aquila, Lisa Filipelli, Palmer Baranek, Bobbi Summers	Nominated	
Canadian Screen Awards	2024	Best Lead Performance in a Web Program or Series	Bobbi Summers	Nominated	
Canadian Screen Awards	2024	Best Supporting Performance in a Web Program or Series	Bif Naked	Nominated	
Canadian Screen Awards	2024	Picture Editing in a Web Program or Series	Maureen Grant	Won	
