= Khalilah Brooks =

Canadian children's educator (born 1977)

Khalilah Brooks (born September 10, 1977) is a Canadian children's educator, most noted as the creator and star of the television series Aunty B's House.

Originally from Halifax, Nova Scotia, Brooks spent much of her childhood in foster care. As an adult she created the character of Aunty B, creating musical theatre shows for children about life in foster care until the television version was launched in 2023 by Headspinner Productions.

She won the Canadian Screen Award for Best Lead Performance in a Children's or Youth Program or Series at the 12th Canadian Screen Awards in 2024.
