= I Have Nothing (TV series) =

Canadian documentary comedy television series

- Genre: Documentary comedy
- Created by: Carolyn Taylor
- Starring: Carolyn Taylor; Mae Martin; Sandra Bezic; Ekaterina Gordeeva; David Pelletier; Kurt Browning; Brian Orser; Katarina Witt
- Country of origin: Canada
- Original language: English
- No. of seasons: 1
- No. of episodes: 6

Production
- Executive producers: Carolyn Taylor; Zack Russell
- Producers: Maureen Riley; Sandra Bezic; Aileen Gardner
- Cinematography: Chet Tilokani
- Editor: Andy King
- Running time: 31-43 min
- Production companies: Catalyst; Blue Ant Studios; Bell Media

Original release
- Network: Crave
- Release: September 23, 2023

I Have Nothing is a comedy documentary television series created by Canadian actress and comedian Carolyn Taylor. The series follows Taylor on a comical quest to choreograph the perfect pairs figure skating routine set to Whitney Houston’s 1993 hit song “I Have Nothing.” Joining Taylor on her mission is a group of prominent people from the figure skating world including choreographer Sandra Bezic, two-time Olympic gold medalist Ekaterina Gordeeva, Olympic gold medalist David Pelletier, world champions Brian Orser, Kurt Browning, Barbara Underhill and Paul Martini, and award-winning comedian, actor, and writer Mae Martin. The series consists of six episodes and premiered on Crave on September 23, 2023.

== Premise ==
The story begins with the 1988 Winter Olympics in Calgary, when closeted 15 year-old Carolyn Taylor watched Olympic figure skating and Katarina Witt's free skate to Carmen in a red costume on television in her aunt's living room. Almost thirty years later, Taylor was in the car, listening to the 1993 song “I Have Nothing” by Whitney Houston on the radio, and she imagined herself choreographing a gold medal-winning pairs figure skating program set to that song. In the unscripted six-episode series, Taylor embarks on a journey to make her dream a reality. She enlists Canadian choreographer Sandra Bezic as her mentor, struggles to clear the rights to the Houston song, learns to skate from world champion Brian Orser, and gets choreography tips from Bezic, Kurt Browning, Barbara Underhill and Paul Martini to prepare before the rehearsals with Ekaterina Gordeeva and David Pelletier start. The series culminates with Gordeeva and Pelletier's performance of a figure skating program, choreographed by Taylor herself, in front of a live audience.

== Cast ==
- Carolyn Taylor as herself
- Mae Martin as themself
- Sandra Bezic as herself
- Ekaterina Gordeeva as herself
- David Pelletier as himself
- Kurt Browning as himself
- Elladj Baldé as himself
- Riku Miura as herself
- Ryuichi Kihara as himself
- Brian Orser as himself
- Jully Black as herself
- Sabrina Jalees as herself
- Barbara Underhill as herself
- Paul Martini as himself
- Katarina Witt as herself
- Elvira Kurt as herself
- Kristi Yamaguchi as herself
- Adam Rippon as himself
- Tara Lipinski as herself
- Elizabeth Manley as herself
- Mathieu Caron as himself
- Bruno Marcotte as himself

== Episodes ==
No. overall	No. in season	Title	Directed by	Written by	Original release date
1	1	"Package For The Bird"	Carolyn Taylor, Zack Russell	Carolyn Taylor	September 23, 2023
After thinking about choreographing a pairs figure skating routine to Whitney Houston's "I Have Nothing" for years, Carolyn finally starts preparing to make her dream a reality. She meets her team and mentor Sandra Bezic that will guide her on her journey. She struggles to find her skaters.
2	2	"Do You Know About The Cold War"	Carolyn Taylor, Zack Russell	Carolyn Taylor	September 23, 2023
Carolyn speaks to her skaters Olympic gold medalists Katya Gordeeva and David Pelletier for the first time. She gets a chance to work with Elladj Baldé and pairs skaters Riku Miura and Ryuichi Kihara.
3	3	"Love is Pain"	Carolyn Taylor, Zack Russell	Carolyn Taylor	September 23, 2023
Carolyn learns to skate from Brian Orser and attempts to clear the rights to the Houston song. Sandra Bezic and Kurt Browning teach Carolyn how to communicate and work with skaters, and Carolyn learns how to work with two skaters at a time with pairs skaters Barbara Underhill and Paul Martini.
4	4	"No Longer A Joke"	Carolyn Taylor, Zack Russell	Carolyn Taylor	September 23, 2023
Katya and David have arrived, and the first day of rehearsals begins. It is time for Carolyn to prove to her skaters and to herself that she can be a choreographer.
5	5	"Today Is Wednesday"	Carolyn Taylor, Zack Russell	Carolyn Taylor	September 23, 2023
Rehearsals come to an end, and Carolyn's anxiety and self-doubt set in. Carolyn and Sandra make an impromptu trip to Edmonton and the venue of the 1988 Winter Olympics in Calgary.
6	6	"Buffoon Makes Good"	Carolyn Taylor, Zack Russell	Carolyn Taylor	September 23, 2023
Carolyn makes the last adjustments to the routine with Katya and David, works with the lighting team and costume designer Mathieu Caron. The VIPs start arriving for the show but the big question for Carolyn is; will Katarina Witt be able to make it?

== Production ==
=== Development ===
Taylor used to incorporate her idea of choreographing a pairs figure skating routine into her standup comedy performances on stage and would make audiences laugh when she told them that she would do it for real one day. Taylor partnered with Zack Russell during the COVID-19 pandemic. Russell would go on to co-executive produce and co-direct beside her, and when Catalyst and Blue Ant Studios came on board, Bell Media commissioned the show in June 2022. The series was supported by the Rogers Cable Fund and the Bell Fund with Blue Ant International holding global distribution rights.

=== Casting ===
Taylor was obsessed with the 1988 Winter Olympics in Calgary, and the performances of Ekaterina Gordeeva, Katarina Witt and Kurt Browning were etched into her memory. Initially, Taylor wanted to pair Witt and Browning but was told by producers that two singles skaters would be unable to perform the pair elements in a pairs routine. Gordeeva convinced husband David Pelletier to work on the project with her because they rarely get the opportunity to perform together. Before rehearsals started, they researched Taylor's previous work and watched some of her sketch shows. They could see she was funny but also artistic and emotional.

=== Filming ===
Principal photography for the unscripted six-episode series began on locations in the Greater Toronto area and Edmonton in October 2022 and wrapped in mid-November 2022. The series finale was filmed at CAA Centre in Brampton.

=== Music ===
The series shows Taylor struggling to clear the song rights to the 1993 Houston single "I Have Nothing" that she wants Gordeeva and Pelletier to perform to. The Whitney Estate agreed for Taylor to use the song but it took a while to get the publishers on board, and the final paperwork was not signed till after filming was completed.

== Release ==
I Have Nothing was screened at the Toronto edition of the annual Just for Laughs comedy festival on September 23, 2023, followed by a panel discussion with Taylor, Mae Martin, Sandra Bezic and Kurt Browning. Later that evening, all six episodes were released on Crave in Canada. The series premiered on CTV in Canada on September 29, 2023 and on Peacock in the U.S. on February 4, 2025.

== Reception ==
=== Critical response ===
Elisabetta Bianchini of Yahoo! Canada described Carolyn's journey as "hysterical and truly riveting" while Mel Woods of Xtra Magazine wrote about the LGBTQ themes of the show: "In many ways, the show itself is a meditation on queer obsession. Queer and trans people often spend a lifetime getting told that we’re too much. We love too deeply and we obsess too fervently, whether that’s about our favourite pop stars, our straight crush or a single line from a decades-old movie." Larry Fried of That Shelf called the series "one of the year’s most original and memorable shows," stating that it's "full of heart, genuine laughs, and – in between the absurdity – provides fascinating commentary on the intersectionality between art and athleticism." The series "proves that with the right conditions, television can be a sanctuary for our dreams," wrote Maggie McPhee of Range.

=== Awards and nominations ===
Year	Award	Category	Nominee	Result	Ref.
2024	Canadian Screen Awards	Best Leading Performance in a Comedy Series	Carolyn Taylor	Nominated	
2024	Canadian Screen Awards	Best Guest Performance in a Comedy Series	Mae Martin	Won	
2024	Canadian Screen Awards	Best Photography in a Comedy Program or Series	Chet Tilokani	Nominated	
