= Queen of the Deuce =

- Directed by: Valerie Kontakos
- Written by: Valerie Kontakos; Despina Pavlaki; Christos Asteriou
- Produced by: Exile Films; Storyline Entertainment; ERT; Radio Télévision Suisse
- Cinematography: Patrick McGowan; Martina Radwan
- Edited by: Rob Ruzic
- Music by: Ken Myhr
- Release dates: November 2022 (DOC NYC); 2024
- Running time: 78 mins
- Countries: Canada; United States; Greece

Queen of the Deuce is a documentary film on the life of Chelly Wilson, porn cinema entrepreneur.

== Background ==
Greek-American film director Valerie Kontakos was 11 years old when, in 1975, Chelly Wilson came to visit in Athens, Greece her parents who were in the film distribution business. Kontakos was impressed by Wilson, whose "booming voice" and "flair for storytelling" made her "the center of attention." Upon returning to the States, Kontakos worked for a time as a cashier at the Tivoli, one of Wilson's 42nd Street cinemas.

== Story ==
After getting into the film production industry as a sound editor for the Maysles brothers, Kontakos moved on to produce and direct a number of film projects, before embarking on a documentary on the life story of the subject that had fascinated her as a child. Her film, Queen of the Deuce, is all about the "unbelievable" life story of Wilson, "deuce" being slang for the "once crime-ridden" Times Square / 42nd street area.

Rachel Serrero was born on 25 December 1908 in Salonica, Greece, to a Ladino-speaking, Greek-Jewish family. In 1939, foreseeing the Nazi threat, she secured a safe foster home for her two children and emigrated to the United States. After the war's end, in 1945, she arranged for her children to come to America, as well. While her appearance was, to all who'd meet her, that of "a demure, bourgeois woman", Serrero, changing her name to Chelly Wilson, was to become a successful investor in real estate, restaurants, and movie theaters. From the 1960s onward, she owned and operated a string of cinemas in New York City, mainly on Manhattan's 42nd Street, showing hardcore porn films, among which were also, in a move ahead of her times, gay porn titles.

Kontakos filmed interviews with people who had met or worked with her film's subject, and related the lesbian relationships Wilson openly maintained throughout her time in the States. Wilson, after two marriages to men, refused to hide the sexual identity she had discovered late in life and created an "alternative family unit," pushing the boundaries of queerness by living for a long period of time with two women, her second husband, and children from both her marriages, all at once.

Like some "eccentric force of nature," Wilson is seen "barking" orders to associates and employees, chomping interminably on cigars, and "holding court like a mafia queen" in the comfortable apartment on the first floor of the gay-porn movie house Eros in which she and her family lived. Wilson regularly organized high-stakes poker games, with players drawn from an indiscriminate list of patrons, including porn stars and organized-crime figures.

== Reception ==
The documentary, released theatrically on 24 May 2024, was met with mostly positive reviews. IndieWire's Samantha Bergeson wrote that, while the HBO series The Deuce has attracted viewers to the history of porn's vintage cinema, it is "the outrageous true story of Times Square staple Chelly Wilson" that's "getting the spotlight," in a documentary that brings forth the life of one of the "feminist icons in the 20th century sex industry space." The Tablet reviewer was "absolutely captivated". Variety opined that the life story of a "larger-than-life Greek émigré" had a history even more dramatic than her associates knew, all "briskly chronicled" in this "entertaining cultural footnote." The Screen Daily wrote of a "fascinating, colourful portrait" mapping out "a quirky story of love – both of family and of the pornographic kind" that has the "feel of a family album." The New York Post reviewer wrote of a documentary that "celebrates the wild life of...a colorful and fiery character," who, when near death at the age of 86, even wrote up specific instructions to her daughters on the food they should serve at her memorial.

The New York Times critic found the story's recounting "curiously flat" and with a "stilted" style, yet "tastefully directed." The viewer will sense "the milieu" but the "matriarch remains stubbornly indistinct."

The aggregate-watching website Rotten Tomatoes reported an 86% approval rating.

== See also ==
- History of the Jews in Thessaloniki
