= Little Big Community =

- Country of origin: Canada

Original release
- Network: APTN
- Release: 2023 – present

Little Big Community is a Canadian documentary television series, which premiered in 2023 on APTN. Created to counter mainstream media narratives that often highlight indigenous communities only in terms of poverty and crisis, the series visits various indigenous communities throughout Canada to profile people who are making positive change.

The series received an immediate renewal from APTN, such that series creator Angie-Pepper O'Bomsawin was already in production on the second season before the first season even premiered. The second season will expand its focus to include indigenous communities in the United States.

The series received a Canadian Screen Award nomination for Best Factual Series at the 12th Canadian Screen Awards in 2024.
