= Canada's Ultimate Challenge =

Canadian reality television series

Canada's Ultimate Challenge is a Canadian reality television series, which premiered in February 2023 on CBC Television. The series, touted as a cross-national "obstacle course", features teams of Canadians competing in various physical challenges, such as whitewater rafting or rock climbing, at various locations throughout Canada, until the ultimate winning team is chosen.

The first season was hosted by Craig McMorris and Nikki Reyes, and featured the teams being coached by prominent Canadian athletes including Donovan Bailey, Waneek Horn-Miller, Clara Hughes, Gilmore Junio, Jen Kish and Luke Willson. The prize, including a trip to Paris for the 2024 Summer Olympics, was won by Team Black, consisting of Vinny Rojas of Dorval, Quebec, Alana Warnick of Winnipeg, Manitoba, Bradley Farquhar of Halifax, Nova Scotia, and Devon MD Jones of Toronto, Ontario. A second season debuted in April 2024 with host Brandon Gonez, dropping the celebrity coaches to centre on players having to navigate the challenges themselves. The winning team won a VIP trip to cheer on Team Canada at the 2024 Olympic Games in Paris.

A third season aired in 2025

== Awards ==
Award	Date of ceremony	Category	Recipient(s)	Result	Ref.
Canadian Screen Awards	2024	Best Reality/Competition Series	John Brunton, Mark Lysakowski, Phil Gurin, Ann-Marie Redmond, Jeff Thrasher, Robyn Bigue, Ken Katigbak, Catherine Petersen, Sarah James, Vanessa Rennard, Michael Yerxa, Sue Brophey	Nominated	
Canadian Screen Awards	2024	Best Casting, Non-Fiction	Jake Rehorst, Jesse Storey, Nancy Yeboah, Michael Yerxa	Nominated	
Canadian Screen Awards	2024	Best Production Design or Art Direction in a Non-Fiction Program or Series	Monika Geresz	Nominated	
Canadian Screen Awards	2024	Best Sound in a Lifestyle, Reality or Entertainment Program or Series	David Best, Daniel Hewett, Justin Ladd, Brian Mellersch, Malcolm Owen Flood, Simon Paine, Mark Krupka, Sammy Yi, Chandra Bulucon, Lisa Meitin	Nominated	
