= Drink Masters =

American reality television series

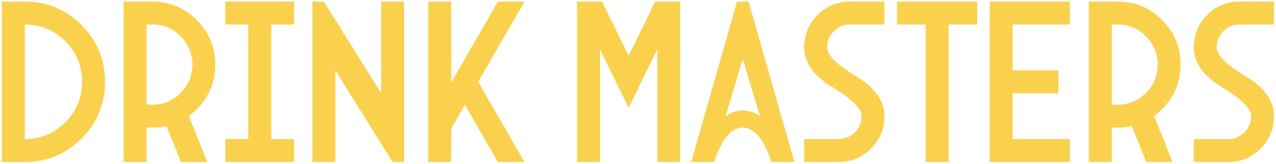
- Genre: Reality show
- Presented by: Tone Bell
- Countries of origin: Canada; United States
- Original language: English
- No. of seasons: 1
- No. of episodes: 10

Production
- Running time: 35-40 minutes
- Production company: Marblemedia

Original release
- Network: Netflix
- Release: October 28, 2022 – present

Drink Masters is a 2022 reality television series that premiered on Netflix on October 28, 2022. The show was renewed for a second season in late 2023, and filming was underway early 2024.

== Concept ==
Twelve innovative mixologists face each other in a cocktail competition. They compete in a series of high-stakes cocktail challenges to win a life-changing prize and the title of "The Ultimate Drink Master".

== Cast ==
- Tone Bell, host
- Frankie Solarik, judge
- Julie Reiner, judge

== Contestants ==
Contestants of Drink Masters
Contestant	Based	Outcome
Lauren "LP" Paylor O'Brien	Washington, D.C.	Winner
Kate Gerwin	Albuquerque, New Mexico	Runner-up
Tao Zrafi	Montreal, Canada	Runner-up
Christian "Suzu" Suzuki-Orellana	San Francisco, California	4th place
Loyd Von Rose	Montreal, Canada	5th place
Alex Velez	San Francisco, California	6th place
Michael Anderson	Pittsburgh, Pennsylvania	7th place
Kapri Robinson	Washington, D.C.	8th place
Aisling Gammill	Boise, Idaho	9th place
Meredith Barry	St. Louis, Missouri	10th place
Raj Shukla	Fort Wayne, Indiana	11th place
Natalie Migliarini	Las Vegas, Nevada	12th place

== Contestant progress ==
Progress of contestants including placements in each episode
Contestant	Episode									
Contestant	1	2	3	4	5	6	7	8	9	10
LP	SAFE	WIN	SAFE	SAFE	SAFE	WIN	BTM	WIN	WIN	Winner
Kate	SAFE	SAFE	SAFE	WIN	SAFE	BTM	BTM	BTM	WIN	Runner-up
Tao	SAFE	SAFE	SAFE	SAFE	WIN	WIN	WIN	WIN	BTM	Runner-up
Suzu	SAFE	SAFE	BTM	BTM	BTM	SAFE	WIN	BTM	ELIM	
Loyd	SAFE	BTM	WIN	SAFE	SAFE	SAFE	BTM	ELIM		
Alex	BTM	SAFE	SAFE	WIN	SAFE	BTM	ELIM			
Michael	SAFE	SAFE	SAFE	WIN	SAFE	ELIM				
Kapri	BTM	SAFE	WIN	BTM	ELIM					
Aisling	WIN	SAFE	SAFE	ELIM						
Meredith	SAFE	SAFE	ELIM							
Raj	SAFE	ELIM								
Natalie	ELIM									
