= 21 Black Futures =

21 Black Futures is a Canadian film and theatre project, broadcast by CBC Gem in 2021. Created in conjunction with the Black Canadian theatre company Obsidian Theatre to mark both Black History Month and the 21st anniversary of Obsidian, the project commissioned 21 short film adaptations of theatrical monologues on the theme of "the future of Blackness" by Black Canadian writers, each performed by a Black actor on the stage of Meridian Hall in Toronto.

The project was commissioned in part because the COVID-19 pandemic in Canada had prevented the staging of a traditional theatre festival.

The project aired over three weeks in February 2021, with seven films premiering each week on February 12, 19 and 26.

== Films ==
Film	Director	Writer	Actor	Synopsis
The Death News	Charles Officer	Amanda Parris	Lovell Adams-Gray	A man performs and records his own obituary on The Death News, a television show which airs testimonials by the recently deceased, to be broadcast in the event of his future death.
The Sender	Leah-Simone Bowen	Cheryl Foggo	Amanda Cordner	Cil Brown is a Sender with a project that exiles racists to their own island society.
Jah in the Ever Expanding Song	d’bi.young anitafrika	Kaie Kellough	Ravyn Wngz	
Beyere	Lisa Karen Cox	Shauntay Grant	Natasha Courage Bacchus	
Madness with Rocks	Jamie Robinson	Peace Akintade	Dion Johnstone	
Witness Shift	Sarah Waisvisz	Donna-Michelle St. Bernard	Uche Ama	
Sensitivity	Mike Payette	Lawrence Hill	Sabryn Rock	
Special	Jay Northcott	Keshia Cheesman	Avery Grant	Eight-year-old Zari has moved with her mother to an all-Black town, but finds that although she fits in with her classmates at school she misses the feeling of being special and different.
Umoja Corp.	Leighton Alexander Williams	Jacob Sampson	Pablo Ogunlesi	A corporation that works to amass and defend Black knowledge and strength steps in to help Adrian after he runs into trouble with the law.
Notice	Ngozi Paul	Luke Reece	Lisa Berry	Inspired by the global anti-racism protests that took place during her childhood in 2020, the now-adult Crystal Hinds rises into a position to make a powerful difference in 2045.
Blackberries	Alicia K. Harris	Miali-Elise Coley-Sudlovenick	Adeline Bird	Effie, a woman of mixed African and Inuk heritage, travels to Nunavut for her grandmother's funeral.
Emmett	Tanisha Taitt	Syrus Marcus Ware	Prince Amponsah	Medgar, one of the few survivors of a catastrophe that largely wiped out human civilization seven years earlier, talks about his life and recalls his relationship with his lover Emmett.
Georgeena	Weyni Mengesha	Djanet Sears	Virgilia Griffith	After fleeing her wedding when she realized she was marrying into an all-white world, Georgeena believes she is going to die because her car is being followed.
Rebirth of the Afronauts: A Black Space Odyssey	Jerome Kruin	Wendy Motion Brathwaite	Chelsea Russell	In 2059, Chariott receives a mysterious call that leads her on an exploration of whole new vistas of experience.
Cavities	Mumbi Tindyebwa Otu	K. T. Dennis	Alison Sealy-Smith	
40 Parsecs and Some Fuel	Lucius Dechausay	Omari Newton	Daniel Faraldo	
The Prescription	Alison Duke	Lisa Codrington	Akosua Amo-Adem	
Chronologie	Mike Payette, Katia Café-Fébrissy	Stephie Mazunya	Sheila Ingabire-Isaro	
Y&N Ara Asaase Ni (This Is Our Own Native Land)	Dorothy A. Atabong	Tawiah M'carthy	Peter Fernandes	
Builders of Nations	Kimberley Rampersad	Joseph Jomo Pierre	Philip Akin	
Omega Child	Ahdri Zhina Mandiela	Cherissa Richards	Emerjade Simms	

== Awards ==
Award	Date of ceremony	Category	Recipient(s)	Result	Ref(s)
Canadian Screen Awards	2022	Best Web Program or Series, Fiction	Mumbi Tindyebwa Otu, Lucius Dechausay, Fatuma Adar, Michael Sinclair, Myekah Payne, Grazyna Krupa	Won	
Canadian Screen Awards	2022	Best Lead Performance, Web Program or Series	Lovell Adams-Gray	Won	
Canadian Screen Awards	2022	Best Lead Performance, Web Program or Series	Lisa Berry	Nominated	
Canadian Screen Awards	2022	Best Supporting Performance, Web Program or Series	Chelsea Russell	Nominated	
Canadian Screen Awards	2022	Best Direction, Web Program or Series	Lucius Dechausay	Nominated	
Canadian Screen Awards	2022	Best Direction, Web Program or Series	Charles Officer	Won	
Canadian Screen Awards	2022	Best Writing, Web Program or Series	Lawrence Hill	Nominated	
Canadian Screen Awards	2022	Best Writing, Web Program or Series	Amanda Parris	Won	
