= Andrea Jin =

Canadian comedian

- Born: Andrea Jin; 5 January 1996 (age 30); Shanghai, China
- Occupation: Comedian
- Years active: 2021–present
- Website: andreajin.com

Andrea Jin (born 5 January 1996) is a Canadian comedian. She is best known for her 2021 comedy album Grandma's Girl, for which she won the 2022 Juno Award for Comedy Album of the Year.

Jin was born in China, and lived there until around age 10 when she moved to the Vancouver area. She attended Western University, but left before receiving a degree. She now resides in Los Angeles.
