= Gay Mean Girls =

Canadian comedy web series

- Genre: Dramedy; Coming of age; Teen drama
- Created by: Heyishi Zhang
- Written by: Heyishi Zhang (Seasons 1-2); A. Liu (Season 1); M. Hassan (Seasons 1-2); Isabel Putz-Preyra (Season 1); Hayley Wong (Season 1); Jacklyn Osadebamwen (Season 2); Kourtney Jackson (Season 2)
- Directed by: Heyishi Zhang
- Starring: Vicky Li (Season 1); Hannah Raine (Season 1); Jenna Phoa (Season 2); Robyn Matuto (Season 2)
- No. of seasons: 2

Production
- Producers: Maddy Falle; Hayley Wong
- Cinematography: Hayley Wong
- Editors: Ceecee Quinne; Monica Remba; Fiona Alvarez; Benjamin Sagar; David Larocque; Genevieve Latour
- Running time: 8-14 minutes

Gay Mean Girls is a Canadian teen dramedy anthology web series created and directed by Heyishi Zhang, produced by Maddy Falle and co-producer Hayley Wong. Both seasons premiered in June 2019, and January 2023 at TIFF Next Wave to a sold-out audience. The second season received over 30 accolades internationally before it was nominated for 3 Canadian Screen Awards. Both seasons air on Shaftebury's KindaTV YouTube Channel and Season One airs on Revry.

Gay Mean Girls examines issues within the LGBTQ+ community through coming of age stories about queer racialized teens. It is based on a viral short film that amassed over 3.5 million views on YouTube.

== Plot ==
=== Season 1 ===
The series follows the events of the short film while expanding on characters, themes, and other events. Prom committee member Lucy Ching seeks to establish Gay Prom Royalty to impress her best friend Miranda, feminist, lesbian beauty guru on YouTube. In the midst of questioning her sexuality, Lucy struggles to fit in with the white gay community. As she gains confidence in her leadership, she realizes that she cannot relate to Miranda's brand of white feminism, and forms allies with other characters who share her struggles.

=== Season 2 ===
The second season expands on the themes of season one while following a different group of students (with some recurring characters) and takes place the following school year. When student journalist Savannah Lin becomes embroiled in the complicated dynamics of a social justice "safe space", she must choose between protecting her community or the integrity of her voice in the wake of a betrayal. The season addresses themes of corruption within social justice spaces and the fight for narrative control.

== Cast ==
=== Main (Season 1) ===
- Vicky Li as Lucy Ching, an unpopular member of the prom committee hoping to better understand herself and her sexuality.
- Hannah Raine as Miranda Hayes, an outgoing lesbian YouTuber and Lucy's best friend.
- Jordan Li as Jamie, the school's cool, non-binary drug dealer and friend of Lucy.
- Lane Webber as Anita, the enthusiastic president of the school's Gay Straight Alliance.
- Jensen Porter as Clara, an uptight straight-girl and president of the prom committee.

=== Main (Season 2) ===
- Jenna Phoa as Savannah Lin, an ambitious but insecure journalist determined to win a scholarship to escape her parents' control.
- Robyn Matuto as Jenn, the free spirited leader of Exhausted Not Exotic, a community arts safe space for queer and trans youth.
- Vicky To as Skye, a popular member of Exhausted Not Exotic who believes they know what's best for others.
- Lydia Lowe as Amy, Savannah's mom who defends her family's image at all costs.
- Kat Khan as Katie, Savannah's best friend in the school's AV club who struggles with boundaries.

== Episodes ==
Season 1
No.	Title	Directed By	Written By	Original Air Date	Length
1	"The Queer Monarchy"	Heyishi Zhang	Heyishi Zhang	January 18, 2020	10:13
Lucy Ching lives in the shadow of her assertive and confident best friend Miranda who's remiss about the lack of same sex prom royalty winners. At the prom committee meeting, Lucy proposes a new Gay Prom Royalty initiative. Prom committee president Clara rejects the idea, and the two friends stage a protest, attracting the attention of GSA leader Anita. When Clara interrupts the protest, she and Lucy fight about their rights. Miranda films this interaction, which gets posted online. Although Lucy and Miranda get suspended by the principal, Lucy's gay prom royalty idea is approved.
2	"Liang Liang"	Heyishi Zhang	A. Liu	January 19, 2020	9:42
Lucy hides her suspension from her overbearing mother by pretending to be sick. Miranda pays Lucy a surprise visit at her home and the cultural differences between their upbringings are revealed. They share an intimate moment when Miranda reads Lucy a poem.
3	"The Questioning Lesbian"	Heyishi Zhang	M. Hassan	January 20, 2020	9:34
Lucy realizes she has romantic feelings for Miranda. She comes out to Jamie, who advises her to attend the GSA to drum up more support for the Gay Prom Royalty initiative. While there, Lucy experiences imposter syndrome, and receives a lukewarm reception until Miranda shows up. Later, Lucy comes out to an ecstatic Miranda.
4	"The Party"	Heyishi Zhang	Isabel Putz-Preyra	January 21, 2020	11:27
When a drunken Miranda offers to kiss Lucy at Anita's party, Lucy freaks out and flees to the bathroom. Meanwhile, Anita's enthusiastic musical promposal to her girlfriend Cassandra doesn't go over well. At the end of the night, Lucy witnesses Miranda kissing another girl and continues to hide her true feelings.
5	"Spicy Discourse"	Heyishi Zhang	Heyishi Zhang & Hayley Wong	January 22, 2020	12:49
Lucy finally confesses her feelings toward Miranda, who rejects her and insist on staying friends. When Lucy goes on Jamie and Anita's podcast to drum up some hype about her Gay Prom initiative, she breaks down about feeling unlovable and comes out to the whole school. Afterward, she has a heart to heart with Jamie, and Miranda finds Lucy to apologize and the two kiss.
6	"The Campaign"	Heyishi Zhang	Heyishi Zhang	January 23, 2020	10:08
Now the school's lesbian "it couple", Lucy and Miranda campaign as prom queens amidst some stiff competition. With Jamie's help, Anita tries again to prompose to Cassandra, finally securing a yes. Miranda gets too caught up in the campaign and overlooks Lucy's feelings in favour of winning. Jamie confronts Lucy about Miranda's toxicity, making Lucy reconsider everything.
7	"White Fragility"	Heyishi Zhang	Heyishi Zhang	January 24, 2020	8:55
When Clara tries to send out rainbow-coloured invitations for Gay Prom, Lucy becomes concerned about queer kids of colour being outed. She confronts Clara in front of the prom committee, demanding that she step down as president. Clara reluctantly agrees and Lucy is voted in as the new president. Back at home, Miranda disagrees with the way Lucy handled things. Lucy calls her out on her privileged mindset and breaks up with her.
8	"Your Best Canadian Girl"	Heyishi Zhang	Heyishi Zhang	January 25, 2020	13:33
On prom night, a vengeful Clara lights the voting box on fire, leaving Gay Prom Royalty a mystery. Lucy scurries to perform a recount. The time comes to finally announce Gay Prom Royalty - and Jamie is declared the winner. Afterwards, Lucy finally speaks up for herself and confronts Miranda, explaining why they can't see each other anymore. Lucy apologizes to Jamie, and the two embrace. At prom, Lucy dances by herself, savouring her self acceptance.

Season 2
No.	Title	Directed By	Written By	Original Air Date	Length
1	The Business of Hope	Heyishi Zhang	Heyishi Zhang	February 24, 2023	12:39
Student journalist Savannah Lin must deliver a stellar pitch to her school's AV club to complete her scholarship application video. Searching for a subject, Savannah discovers Exhausted Not Exotic (ENE), a community arts "safe space" for queer and trans teens of colour. Smitten with her new "chosen family" and the group's charismatic leader Jenn, Savannah pitches a video essay about ENE, and gets the school camera.
2	The Business of Love	Heyishi Zhang	M. Hassan	February 24, 2023	13:06
Savannah embarks on a 72-hour-long bender of emotional intimacy with Jenn and learns the complex inner workings behind the group's dynamics. They bond over shared trauma, and Jenn confides in Savannah about conflicts with a lower tier ENE member. Savannah's mother forces her to come out by playing her pornography.
3	The Business of Trust	Heyishi Zhang	Kourtney Jackson	February 24, 2023	9:34
Savannah expresses disdain towards a beloved ENE member Skye's short film, and is humbled by Jenn for her privileged point of view. When Savannah meets Skye at a pre-drink party, she changes her mind and accepts their offer to collaborate on her scholarship video. Savannah drinks too much after finding out that she's shortlisted for the scholarship, and confesses her insecurities to Skye.
4	The Business of Perfection	Heyishi Zhang	Jacklyn Osadebamwen	February 24, 2023	11:23
At the video shoot for Savannah's scholarship, Skye berates Savannah for her lack of inclusivity and strongarms her into changing her interview questions. To make amends, Savannah accepts an invitation to Skye's house that evening, where she is sexually assaulted.
5	The Business of Shame	Heyishi Zhang	Jacklyn Osadebamwen	February 24, 2023	15:58
In the lead up to ENE's first public screening of Savannah's scholarship film, Savannah struggles to articulate her experiences from the previous night. All the ENE members loves Savannah's film but Savannah is forced to watch her creative voice being robbed by her community. Jenn refuses to believe Savannah about being assaulted, and is steadfast about containing the situation. Savannah returns home to find her room gutted by her parents, so she trashes her house, and runs away.
6	The Business of Justice	Heyishi Zhang	Heyishi Zhang	February 24, 2023	12:49
Staying over at her friend Katie's house, Savannah has a nightmarish fever-dream in the perfect land of Queertopia, where Savannah falls off a pedestal and is punished through banishment. After a reality check from her friend Katie, Savannah returns home to confront her parents about her wounds and regain her power.
7	The Business of Accountability	Heyishi Zhang	Heyishi Zhang	February 24, 2023	11:20
Savannah tries to call out Skye at ENE, but is thwarted by Jenn, who will do anything to maintain peace. After being invited to a community wide town hall, Savannah concocts a plan to confront Jenn on camera. The interview goes awry, and Savannah realizes that community is no longer the place for her. Savannah blows off the town hall, and ENE, for the last time.
8	The Business of Grief	Heyishi Zhang	M. Hassan	February 24, 2023	11:11
When Savannah's Woodrow scholarship film is released, the community is abuzz with gossip. Savannah tries to heal from her experiences after getting the scholarship. In a montage, Jenn is revealed to have stepped down as leader, and ENE has rebranded under new leadership while continuing to maintain ties with Skye. Katie stops being friends with Savannah. Savannah sets forth towards her future, armed with a greater sense of self-trust and understanding of who she is.

== Production ==
=== Season One ===
The first season of Gay Mean Girls was funded by the Bell Fund and Telefilm's Talent to Watch Program. Principal photography began October 2018. The season premiered at TIFF NextWave in 2019 to a sold-out audience. On Global News, creator Heyishi Zhang says she drew inspiration for season one from her own high school relationships as well as her political awakening in university.

During the time of filming, Vicky Li was only fifteen years old. The rest of the cast was also relatively young, with Lane Webber and Jordan Li both being eighteen and members of the GSA at the high school where the series was shot.

As a series that explores feminism, intersectionality and the experience of racialized teens, all key creatives are the show are women, with the writer's room being composed entirely of queer women of colour. The team also spoke with a non-binary consultant when writing Jamie's character.

=== Season Two ===
Season two of Gay Mean Girls was funded by the Bell Fund, Ontario Creates, the Canadian Media Fund and Shaw Rocket Fund.

The writing room was composed entirely of queer women of colour, as was the majority of the cast and crew. Many of the season's themes, including corruption within social justice spaces, are based on Zhang's personal experiences. In a 2023 interview, Zhang told CanCulture Magazine: "[H]onestly, it was really hard…. I think for me, the show is a way for me to organize my memories. And my memories are not that pleasant…... So I had to dig in. I think that I had to really try to understand not only my environment, and the social rules of my environment… [b]ut also, I have to seek to understand the people around me, and that included the people who have hurt me as well."

While casting for season 2, Robyn Matuto, who plays Jenn, was an immediate standout and was the first person to be cast. For Savannah's role, Zhang believed that the actor playing Savannah would first audition for Jenn; she was proven right when Jenna Phoa initially auditioned for Matuto's role.

Principal photography for season two began March 2022 and took 18 days with 2 days of re-shoots.

The second season premiered at the TIFF Next Wave in January 2023.

== Reception ==
Gay Mean Girls has been praised for its candid exploration of intersectionality and the problematization of "white queerness" within the queer community. Critics have noted the show's subversion of stereotypes typical of queer romance, such as being in love with a best friend, having a white protagonist, and focusing solely on romantic love. Speaking on its modern, unapologetic nature, the online magazine starrymag points out, "[y]ou don't see a lot of shows bringing up topics like gaslighting and heteronormativity from the first episode and I was pleasantly surprised to see it discussed in such a raw and natural way, that's still entertaining." Bella Media Channel compares Gay Mean Girls to other niche, queer series such as Carmilla and Barbelle.

In 2019, Gay Mean Girls was featured on Elle Canada's Pop Culture Radar.

Season two was praised for its vibrant visuals and inclusion of physical media. It was also touted for its thoughtful portrayal of complex issues such as weaponization of social justice language, betrayal, and its critique of safe spaces. The series challenges typical tropes and power dynamics, acting as a strong "deconstruction of chosen families."

The Toronto Guardian praised the series for its authenticity, noting that director "Heyishi Zhang brings a lot of herself into these stories and creates an incredibly layered, raw and honest portrayal of intersectional issues within the queer community… [she] brings these issues to the forefront while also creating something fun, vibrant, and sarcastic that's a joy to watch."

CanCulture Magazine says the second season "challenges what family means to young, marginalized communities and how it can change as you learn to be true to yourself."

== Awards and nominations ==
Year	Festival	Award Category	Result
2023	Stareable LA	Best Drama	Won
2023	Stareable LA	Best Cinematography	Nominated
2023	Stareable LA	Best Female Creator	Nominated
2023	Stareable LA	Best Virtual Filmmaking	Nominated
2023	Stareable LA	Best Writing	Nominated
2023	Yorkton Film Festival	Series	Won
2023	T.O. Webfest	Best LGBTQ+ Series	Nominated
2023	New Jersey Webfest	Best Dramedy	Nominated
2023	New Jersey Webfest	Best Lead Actress (Drama)	Nominated
2023	Sydney Webfest	SWF Diversity Award	Won
2023	Sydney Webfest	Best Screenplay	Nominated
2023	Sydney Webfest	Best Editing	Nominated
2023	Sydney Webfest	Best Drama	Nominated
2023	Minnesota Webfest	Best LGBTQ+ Series	Won
2023	Minnesota Webfest	Best Dramedy	Nominated
2023	Minnesota Webfest	Best Trailer	Nominated
2023	Minnesota Webfest	Best BIPOC Series	Nominated
2023	Minnesota Webfest	Best Comedic Ensemble	Nominated
2023	New Zealand Webfest	Best Webseries	Nominated
2023	New Zealand Webfest	Best Directing	Nominated
2023	New Zealand Webfest	Best Acting	Nominated
2023	New Zealand Webfest	Best Writing	Nominated
2023	New Zealand Webfest	Best Cinematography	Nominated
2023	New Zealand Webfest	Best Editing	Nominated
2023	New Zealand Webfest	Best Score	Nominated
2023	Rio Webfest	Best Makeup	Nominated
2023	Baltimore New Media Webfest	Best Drama	Nominated
2023	Baltimore New Media Webfest	Best Director - Drama	Nominated
2023	Baltimore New Media Webfest	Best Writing - Drama	Nominated
2023	Baltimore New Media Webfest	Best Ensemble Cast	Nominated
2023	Baltimore New Media Webfest	Best LGBTQ, Best Actress	Nominated
2023	Canadian Screen Award	Best Web Program	Nominated
2023	Canadian Screen Award	Best Directing	Nominated
2023	Canadian Screen Award	Best Writing	Nominated
	LA Webfest	Best Drama	Nominated
