= Streams Flow from a River =

Canadian television series

Streams Flow from a River is a Canadian drama web series, which premiered in 2023 on Super Channel's streaming channels on Amazon Prime Video and Apple TV. Created by Christopher Yip, the series centres on a dysfunctional Chinese Canadian family in Frank, Alberta, who are temporarily reunited when the patriarch suffers a stroke, and must confront the past events that drove them apart after an unexpected snowstorm strands them together, with each episode focusing on one character's perspective on their family dramas.

== Cast ==
- Simon Sinn as Gordon Chow, the family patriarch
  - Raymond Chan as young Gordon in flashbacks
- Jane Luk as Diana Chow, his wife who has frequently sacrificed her own happiness for the sake of the marriage and the kids
  - Jinny Wong as young Diana
- Liam Ma as Henry Chow, their son who is struggling with his sexuality
  - Adrian So as young Henry
- Danielle Ayow as Loretta Chow
  - Dana Liu as young Loretta

== Distribution ==
The series received a theatrical screening at the 2023 Canadian Film Festival, in advance of its streaming premiere on April 1. It was also screened in France as part of the 2023 Canneseries festival.

== Awards ==
The series received four Canadian Screen Award nominations at the 12th Canadian Screen Awards in 2024, for Best Lead Performance in a Web Program or Series (Ma), Best Direction in a Web Program or Series (Yip) and two nominations for Best Writing in a Web Program or Series (Yip for "Frank Liquor & Laundromat" and Leonard Chan for "Benny and the Jets").
