= Aunty B's House =

Aunty B's House is a Canadian short-form comedy series for children that premiered in 2023 as part of the CBC Kids block on CBC Television. Designed to highlight the stories of children living in foster care, the show stars children's entertainer and educator Khalilah Brooks as Aunty B, a woman who is caring for foster children Khadijah (Nendia Lewars), Shelley (Claire Poon) and Zachary (Luke Dietz).

Inspired in part on Brooks's own experience having grown up in foster care, the series is based on theatrical shows that Brooks had already performed as Aunty B for a number of years prior to the launch of the television version.

== Awards ==
| Award | Year | Category | Work | Result | Ref(s) |
|---|---|---|---|---|---|
| Canadian Screen Awards | 2024 | Best Pre-School Program or Series | Michelle Melanson, Ken Cuperus, Kara Harun, Khalilah Brooks | Nominated | |
| Canadian Screen Awards | 2024 | Best Lead Performance in a Children's or Youth Program or Series | Khalilah Brooks | Won | |
| Canadian Screen Awards | 2024 | Best Supporting Performance in a Children's or Youth Program or Series | Nendia Lewars | Nominated | | |
| Canadian Screen Awards | 2024 | Best Supporting Performance in a Children's or Youth Program or Series | Claire Poon | Nominated | | |
| Canadian Screen Awards | 2024 | Best Direction in a Children's or Youth Program or Series | Kara Harun, "Dumpling of My Heart" | Nominated | | |
| Canadian Screen Awards | 2024 | Best Writing in a Pre-School Program or Series | Ken Cuperus, "A Trip to Paris" | Nominated | | |
