= Wendy Motion Brathwaite =

Canadian musician, writer and activist

Wendy Motion Brathwaite is a Canadian musician, writer and activist from Toronto, Ontario. She is most noted as cowriter with Charles Officer of the screenplay for the 2020 film Akilla's Escape, for which they won the Canadian Screen Award for Best Original Screenplay at the 9th Canadian Screen Awards in 2021.

She also wrote the short films A Man's Story (2016) and Theodore (2020), and has worked as a writer and story editor on the television series Coroner. In 2022, she received a Canadian Screen Award nomination for Best Writing in a Drama Series at the 10th Canadian Screen Awards for the Coroner episode "Eyes Up", and in 2023 she received a nomination for Best Writing in a Web Program or Series at the 11th Canadian Screen Awards for "The One Who Dies First", an episode of the comedy web series Revenge of the Black Best Friend.

She has performed as a hip hop artist and spoken word poet under the stage name Motion, and released the CD Motion in Poetry: The Audio Xperience. She has also published the poetry collections Motion in Poetry and 40 Dayz, and has written theatrical plays including Oraltorio: A Theatrical Mixtape, 4our Woman, Aneemah’s Spot, Loveleigh’s Logue, Nightmare Dream and Rebirth of the Afronauts: A Black Space Odyssey.
