= Telling Our Story =

Telling Our Story (French: Laissez-nous raconter) is a Canadian documentary web television series, premiered on September 17, 2023 on CBC Gem. Created by documentary filmmaker Kim O'Bomsawin, the series profiles 11 indigenous peoples with territory in Quebec, including Abenaki, Anishinaabe, Atikamekw, Cree, Innu, Inuit, Mi'kmaq, Mohawk, Naskapi, Wendat and Wolastoqiyik communities.

The series also features the participation of Kaniehtiio Horn as narrator, and Florent Vollant as an executive producer.

Prior to its streaming premiere, the first two episodes were received a preview screening in the Primetime program at the 2023 Toronto International Film Festival.
