= The Dessert =

- Country of origin: Canada

Original release
- Network: Crave
- Release: July 7, 2023

The Dessert is a Canadian sketch comedy television series, which premiered July 7, 2023, on Crave. Produced in Hamilton, Ontario, the series stars Shane Cunningham, Isabella Campbell and Jillian Smart in what they describe as "an all-out, boundary-pushing expedition to the edge of decency".

The show's production team includes comedian Bruce McCulloch of The Kids in the Hall, and musician Max Kerman of Arkells, as well as Cunningham, Andrew Ferguson, Matt King, Mark Myers, Ashley Poitevin, Jonathan Popalis, Tinu Sinha, Lewis Spring and Mike Veerman. Cunningham, Kerman and Veerman have all previously been associated with the Mike on Much podcast.

== Episodes ==
No.	Title	Directed by	Written by	Original release date
1	"Popcorn, Sausages, and Bananas"	Mark Myers, Matt Unsworth, Mike Veerman	Jonathan Popalis, Adamo Barbieri, Isabella Campbell, Shane Cunningham, Jeff D’Silva, Mark Myers, Jillian Smart, Matt Unsworth, Mike Veerman	July 7, 2023
The Kiss. Hungover. Vasectomy. No Claps. Faberge Egg. Sh*t Hands. Bulges. Rideshare. Naked News. New Neighbour. Banana Peels
2	"Grapes, Nipples, and Cowboys"	Allison Johnston, Mark Myers	Jonathan Popalis, Adamo Barbieri, Isabella Campbell, Shane Cunningham, Jeff D’Silva, Mark Myers, Jillian Smart, Matt Unsworth, Mike Veerman	July 7, 2023
Flair Bartender. Wedding Speech. Party Store. Mary-Fuque Kill. Time to Dunk. Bad DeNiro. Wedding Photos. Sexy Drifter. Home Alone’d. Jumbotron
3	"Gavels, Ghosts, and Ribs"	Allison Johnston, Mark Myers, Mike Veerman	Jonathan Popalis, Adamo Barbieri, Isabella Campbell, Shane Cunningham, Jeff D’Silva, Mark Myers, Jillian Smart, Matt Unsworth, Mike Veerman	July 7, 2023
A Day at the Zoo. Swear Court. Yipp Kart. Dinner at the Boss’s. Home Videos. My Ghost Roommate and Me. Sassy Twitter. Turner Tonight! Graduation Day. Mommy Feeds Baby
4	"Sisters, Sitcoms, and Dinosaurs"	Mark Myers, Matt Unsworth, Mike Veerman	Jonathan Popalis, Adamo Barbieri, Isabella Campbell, Shane Cunningham, Jeff D’Silva, Mark Myers, Jillian Smart, Matt Unsworth, Mike Veerman	July 7, 2023
Grandpa’s Basement. Office Seinfeld. Comedy Party. Sister Bully. High School Basketball Game. Dinosaur Expert
5	"Bulls, Milk, and Pizza"	Allison Johnston, Mark Myers	Jonathan Popalis, Adamo Barbieri, Isabella Campbell, Shane Cunningham, Jeff D’Silva, Mark Myers, Jillian Smart, Matt Unsworth, Mike Veerman	July 7, 2023
Soft Spot. The Zen Master. Halloween Party. Christmas Morning. The Red Knight
6	"Sightless"	Allison Johnston, Mark Myers, Matt Unsworth	Jonathan Popalis, Adamo Barbieri, Isabella Campbell, Shane Cunningham, Jeff D’Silva, Mark Myers, Jillian Smart, Matt Unsworth, Mike Veerman	July 7, 2023
I: Prologue. II: Emergency. Work Improv. III: Strike. IV: Re-Birth. School Bus Driver. Birthday Season. V: Sightless
