= Black Life: Untold Stories =

- Country of origin: Canada
- No. of seasons: 1
- No. of episodes: 8

Original release
- Network: CBC Television
- Release: October 18 – December 13, 2023

Black Life: Untold Stories is a Canadian television documentary series, premiered on CBC Television on October 18, 2023. Created by Leslie Norville, the eight-episode series profiles Black Canadian history.

Figures associated with the production of the series include Nelson George, Sandy Hudson, Miranda de Pencier, P.K. Subban, Michaëlle Jean, Shad, Will Prosper and Ravyn Wngz.

In advance of its television premiere, it received a preview screening in the Primetime program at the 2023 Toronto International Film Festival. The series premiered on October 18.
