= The Bad Dog Theatre Company =

The Bad Dog Theatre Company is an improvisational theatre company based in Toronto, Ontario, Canada, founded in 2003. The theatre produces a variety of shows, with a focus short-form improv, while also exploring other improvisational techniques.

Bad Dog Theatre Company is an artist-run charity that has produced Toronto’s best improvised comedy for over 40 years.

Starting as Theatresports Toronto in 1982, their stages have featured notable alumni such as Colin Mochrie (Whose Line Is It, Anyway), The Kids in the Hall, Mike Myers, Keanu Reeves, Lauren Ash, Bruce Hunter (Puppets Who Kill), Pat McKenna (The Red Green Show), Gary Campbell (MadTV), Sandra Shamas (Playwright), Linda Kash (A Mighty Wind), and Tim Sims (The Red Green Show), Ann Pornel (The Great Canadian Baking Show), Andrew Phung (Run the Burbs), Veronika Slowikowska (Saturday Night Live), Laura Ramoso, Carly Thorne, TallBoyz, Sex-T-Rex and The Tita Collective.

In 2003 Theatresports Toronto changed its name to Bad Dog Theatre and opened a space at 138 Danforth Ave dedicated to unscripted theater. It wouldn’t be a true Toronto story without at least one eviction, but our second theatre at 875 Bloor St won Best Small Theatre in 2017 and Best Comedy Club in 2018 from Now Toronto.

In 2024, Bad Dog Theatre earned its first Dora Mavor Moore nominations and award, including 3 nominations for Holiday! An Improvised Musical, and winning Outstanding Performance by an Ensemble for Sex-T-Rex’s show, Swordplay.

The theatre regularly hosts shows at venues across Toronto, which include Theatresports shows, Bucket Shows and long form improv events, such as Harold Night at the Bad Dog. It also has a history of parody shows in Toronto, such as Throne of Games, D&D Live, and more.

== History ==
The Bad Dog Theatre Company traces its roots back to 1982, originally founded as Theatresports Toronto. The company's foundational work was influenced by director and playwright Keith Johnstone. They presented weekly improvisational comedy shows at the Harbourfront Centre.

Notable alumni from this period include Mike Myers, Tim Sims, Bruce Hunter, and Colin Mochrie.

Throughout the 1990s, Theatresports Toronto underwent several venue changes. In 2003, the organization rebranded as The Bad Dog Theatre Company and moved into 138 Danforth.

In 2015, the company moved into 875 Bloor but due to the COVID-19 pandemic decided to shut it down. The Bad Dog Theatre Company currently provides classes out of their Kensington Market studio at 392 Spadina and programs comedy shows in popular venues across Toronto.

Several of the theatre's productions have been nominated for Canadian Comedy Awards, and the venue on Danforth Avenue in Toronto has received recognition from NOW Magazine.

== Artistic Directors ==
- Moira Dunphy (Theatresports Toronto)
- Marcel St. Pierre 2003-2010
- Julie Dumais Osborne 2010-2019
- Coko Galore 2019-2022
- Alia Ceniza Rasul 2022-present

== Featured Players Program ==
The Bad Dog Theatre has had 8 iterations of its Featured Players program - a program designed to nurture the next generation of comedic voices. Over the course of the program, the participants develop their skills in improvisation, ensemble creation, and comedic storytelling, culminating in an original live show.

Some notable alumni of the Featured Players include Tricia Black (Pretty Hard Cases), Guled Abdi, Franco Nguyen and Tim Blair (TallBoyz), Ajahnis Charley (This Hour Has 22 Minutes), Coko Galore (Second City), Lisa Gilroy (The Studio), Kyah Green (Sort Of), Rosie Dempsey (Flo and Joan), Tom Hearn (Second City), DJ Mausner (Prom Dates), Clare McConnell (Murdoch Mysteries), Rakhee Morzaria (Run The Burbs), Laura Ramoso (What We Do In The Shadows), Veronika Slowikowska (Saturday Night Live), Carley Thorne (uncarley), and Chris Wilson (This Hour Has 22 Minutes).

=== Season 1 ===
Allana Reoch, Callum Wratten, Chris Ramelan, Christian Smith, Connor Low, Daphney Joseph, Ify Chiwetelu, Nate Callens, Nelu Handa, Rakhee Morzaria, Sarah Szloboda, Talal Itani, Tricia Black.

=== Season 2 ===
Alessandra Vite, Andrea Marston, Andy Hull, Christina Nicolaou, Coko Galore, Gavin Pounds, Hamed Dar, Michelle Hart, Natalie Metcalfe, Nina Adler, Rosie Dempsey, Scott Lloyd, Sharjil Rasool, Tim Blair

=== Season 3 ===
Allison Hogg, Brittney Drysdale, Carol Zoccoli, Chris Wilson, Clare McConnell, Gordon Neill, Lisa Gilroy, Martha Stortz, Monica Garrido, Paul Aihoshi, Ryan Sheedy, Samantha Adams, Samuel Loeb, Zohaib Khan

=== Season 4 ===
Adam Niebergall, Alia Ceniza Rasul, Amanda Parker, Caitlin English, Chris Leveille, Emily Richardson, Filipe Dimas, Ivan Yuen, Jess Grant, Kyah Green, Matt Nadeau, Rebecca Payne, Steven Suepaul, Tom Hearn

=== Season 5 ===
Carolyne Das, D.J. Mausner, Devon Henderson, Emily Bilton, Franco Nguyen, Gillian Bartolucci, Guled Abdi, Justin D’Angelo, King Chiu, Mark Shyzer

=== Season 6 ===
Ajahnis Charley, Andy Assaf, Ayaka Kinugawa, Chelsea Larkin, Griffin Toplitsky, Joe Amero, Laura Ramoso, Patricia Tab, Trevor Tranter, and Veronika Slowikowska

Alex Kolanko, Anne McMaster, Antonis Varkaris, Antony Hall, Brennan Asbridge, Danny Avila, Jackie Twomey, Johan Denora, Leanne Miller, Rhys Naylor, Sam Hancock, Shannon Lahaie, Shohana Sharmin, Youness Robert-Tahiri

=== Season 7 ===
Amanda Cogan, Bita Joudaki, Carley Thorne, Cihang Ma, Dana Puddicombe, Freddie Rivas, Geoff Cork, Miguel Gauthier, Patrick Murray, Randl Morales, Rob Lewin, Rosh Abdullah, Tyra Banda

=== Season 8 ===
Alex Cabrera Aragon, Alexa Mackell, Alfred Chow, Amrutha Krishnan, Janet Mac, Jared Wonago, Lance Oribello, Liz Cyrus, Maddy Atamanchuk, Patrick Ronan, Sachin Sinha, Shane McLean, and stevey hunter.
