= Canadian Screen Award for Best Leading Performance in a Comedy Series =

Annual Canadian television award

The Canadian Screen Award for Best Lead Performance in a Comedy Series is an annual award, presented by the Academy of Canadian Cinema and Television as part of the Canadian Screen Awards program, to honour the best leading performance in a Canadian television comedy series.

It is a merger of the former awards for Best Actor in a Comedy Series and Best Actress in a Comedy Series, following the academy's announcement in August 2022 that it would start presenting gender-neutral acting awards instead of gendered ones.

== 2020s ==
Year	Actor	Series	Ref
2022; 11th Canadian Screen Awards
2022; 11th Canadian Screen Awards	Zaiba Baig	Sort Of	
2022; 11th Canadian Screen Awards	Dani Kind	Workin' Moms	
2022; 11th Canadian Screen Awards	Meredith MacNeill	Pretty Hard Cases	
2022; 11th Canadian Screen Awards	Adrienne C. Moore	Pretty Hard Cases	
2022; 11th Canadian Screen Awards	Rakhee Morzaria	Run the Burbs	
2022; 11th Canadian Screen Awards	Andrew Phung	Run the Burbs	
2022; 11th Canadian Screen Awards	Meaghan Rath	Children Ruin Everything	
2022; 11th Canadian Screen Awards	Catherine Reitman	Workin' Moms	
2023; 12th Canadian Screen Awards
2023; 12th Canadian Screen Awards	Meaghan Rath	Children Ruin Everything	
2023; 12th Canadian Screen Awards	Benjamin Evan Ainsworth	Son of a Critch	
2023; 12th Canadian Screen Awards	Mark Critch	Son of a Critch	
2023; 12th Canadian Screen Awards	Dani Kind	Workin' Moms	
2023; 12th Canadian Screen Awards	Andrew Phung	Run the Burbs	
2023; 12th Canadian Screen Awards	Catherine Reitman	Workin' Moms	
2023; 12th Canadian Screen Awards	Chris Sandiford	Shelved	
2023; 12th Canadian Screen Awards	Carolyn Taylor	I Have Nothing	
2024; 12th Canadian Screen Awards
2024; 12th Canadian Screen Awards	Andrew Phung	Run the Burbs	
2024; 12th Canadian Screen Awards	Aaron Abrams	Children Ruin Everything	
2024; 12th Canadian Screen Awards	Dan Beirne	One More Time	
2024; 12th Canadian Screen Awards	D.J. Demers	One More Time	
2024; 12th Canadian Screen Awards	Rakhee Morzaria	Run the Burbs	
2024; 12th Canadian Screen Awards	Anastasia Phillips	The Trades	
2024; 12th Canadian Screen Awards	Meaghan Rath	Children Ruin Everything	
2024; 12th Canadian Screen Awards	Mary Walsh	The Missus Downstairs	
2025; 14th Canadian Screen Awards
2025; 14th Canadian Screen Awards	Anna Lambe	North of North	
2025; 14th Canadian Screen Awards	Meredith MacNeill	Small Achievable Goals	
2025; 14th Canadian Screen Awards	Anastasia Phillips	The Trades	
2025; 14th Canadian Screen Awards	Jasmeet Raina	Late Bloomer	
2025; 14th Canadian Screen Awards	Meaghan Rath	Children Ruin Everything	
2025; 14th Canadian Screen Awards	Jermaine Richards	The Office Movers	
2025; 14th Canadian Screen Awards	Mary Walsh	The Missus Downstairs	
2025; 14th Canadian Screen Awards	Jennifer Whalen	Small Achievable Goals	
