= Canadian Screen Award for Best Supporting Performance in a Comedy Series =

Annual Canadian television award

The Canadian Screen Award for Best Lead Performance in a Comedy Series is an annual award, presented by the Academy of Canadian Cinema and Television as part of the Canadian Screen Awards program, to honour the best supporting performance in a Canadian television comedy series.

It is a merger of the former awards for Best Supporting Actor in a Comedy Series and Best Supporting Actress in a Comedy Series, following the academy's announcement in August 2022 that it would start presenting gender-neutral acting awards instead of gendered ones.

== 2020s ==
Year	Actor	Series	Ref
2022; 11th Canadian Screen Awards
2022; 11th Canadian Screen Awards	Ennis Esmer	Children Ruin Everything	
2022; 11th Canadian Screen Awards	Tricia Black	Pretty Hard Cases	
2022; 11th Canadian Screen Awards	Amanda Cordner	Sort Of	
2022; 11th Canadian Screen Awards	Malcolm McDowell	Son of a Critch	
2022; 11th Canadian Screen Awards	Sarah McVie	Workin' Moms	
2022; 11th Canadian Screen Awards	Al Mukadam	Pretty Hard Cases	
2022; 11th Canadian Screen Awards	Enuka Okuma	Workin' Moms	
2022; 11th Canadian Screen Awards	Karen Robinson	Pretty Hard Cases	
2023; 12th Canadian Screen Awards
2023; 12th Canadian Screen Awards	Ennis Esmer	Children Ruin Everything	
2023; 12th Canadian Screen Awards	Amanda Cordner	Sort Of	
2023; 12th Canadian Screen Awards	Ali Hassan	Run the Burbs	
2023; 12th Canadian Screen Awards	Jonathan Langdon	Run the Burbs	
2023; 12th Canadian Screen Awards	Sarah McVie	Workin' Moms	
2023; 12th Canadian Screen Awards	Ellora Patnaik	Sort Of	
2023; 12th Canadian Screen Awards	Jonathan Torrens	Vollies	
2023; 12th Canadian Screen Awards	Supinder Wraich	Sort Of	
2024; 13th Canadian Screen Awards
2024; 13th Canadian Screen Awards	Ennis Esmer	Children Ruin Everything	
2024; 13th Canadian Screen Awards	Raoul Bhaneja	The Trades	
2024; 13th Canadian Screen Awards	Lisa Codrington	Children Ruin Everything	
2024; 13th Canadian Screen Awards	Maddy Foley	One More Time	
2024; 13th Canadian Screen Awards	Jonathan Langdon	Run the Burbs	
2024; 13th Canadian Screen Awards	Julie Nolke	Run the Burbs	
2024; 13th Canadian Screen Awards	Patrick McKenna	1 Man's Treasure	
2024; 13th Canadian Screen Awards	Zoriah Wong	Run the Burbs	
2025; 14th Canadian Screen Awards
2025; 14th Canadian Screen Awards	Maika Harper	North of North	
2025; 14th Canadian Screen Awards	Raoul Bhaneja	The Trades	
2025; 14th Canadian Screen Awards	Tricia Black	Small Achievable Goals	
2025; 14th Canadian Screen Awards	Braeden Clarke	North of North	
2025; 14th Canadian Screen Awards	Rodrigo Fernandez-Stoll	Son of a Critch	
2025; 14th Canadian Screen Awards	Lucas Lopez	The Office Movers	
2025; 14th Canadian Screen Awards	Alexander Nunez	Small Achievable Goals	
2025; 14th Canadian Screen Awards	Mikayla SwamiNathan	Children Ruin Everything	
