= Maddy Foley =

Canadian actress

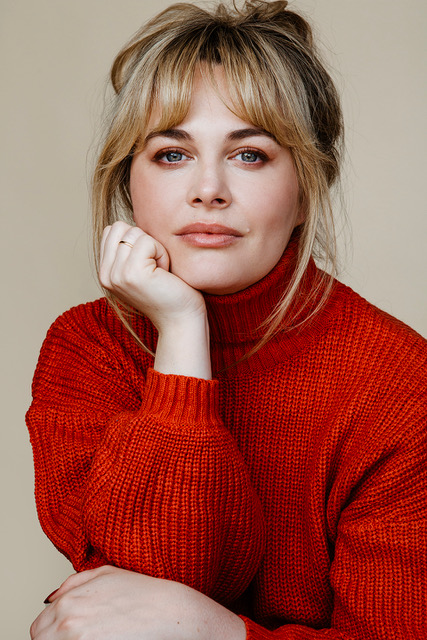
- Maddy Foley, 2024
- Born: Toronto, Ontario, Canada
- Occupations: Actor, screenwriter, director, podcaster
- Known for: One More Time

Maddy Foley is a Canadian actress, writer, director and podcaster from Toronto, Ontario, best known for her roles as Nat in the television series One More Time and Meg in the web series Everybody's Meg.

== Awards ==
| Award | Date of ceremony | Category | Work | Result | Ref. |
|---|---|---|---|---|---|
| Canadian Screen Awards | 2025 | Best Supporting Performance in a Comedy Series | One More Time | Nominated | |
| Canadian Screen Awards | 2025 | Best Ensemble Performance in a Comedy Series | One More Time with D.J. Demers, Geri Hall, Elise Bauman, Dan Beirne, Seran Sathiyaseelan, Dayton Sinkia | Nominated | |
| Canadian Screen Awards | 2025 | Best Writing in a Web Program or Series | Everybody's Meg with Katelyn McCulloch | Nominated | |
