= Dean Wendt =

American voice actor, host and DJ

- Born: Dean Alan Wendt; February 17, 1968 (age 58); Elgin, Illinois, U.S.
- Education: University of Illinois
- Occupations: Voice actor; host; DJ
- Years active: 1990-present
- Spouse: Lori Plummer (m. 2010)
- Children: 2
- Website: www.vothatsreal.com

Dean Alan Wendt (born February 17, 1968) is an American voice actor, host and music DJ, best known as the second voice of Barney the Dinosaur on the hit children's show Barney & Friends following the departure of the character's original voice actor, Bob West.

== Career ==
From 1996 to 2001, Wendt was a DJ and producer on Radio Disney. Additionally he is also the current automated voice heard on Los Angeles Metro Rail trains.

=== Barney & Friends ===
While working at Radio Disney, Wendt heard about a casting call to find a new voice actor for Barney. Wendt auditioned for Barney through his agent. Due to Wendt traveling extensively to Los Angeles, California for Radio Disney, he could never audition in person. Wendt sent in a CD of his initial audition and got a callback. After not hearing anything for a while, he was called to record another demo. Wendt did the audition in the closet at the apartment of Joseph Phillips, the music director of Barney & Friends, in Plano, Texas. He also sang a couple songs and was interviewed as Barney during the auditions. Prior to voicing Barney, Wendt would do the voice for his daughters, who were then two and three years old, respectively.

Wendt started voicing Barney in September 2001 with his first project being the music video for "We Are Family", a music video featuring various children's character made in response to 9/11. His Barney voice was first heard publicly in the 2001 Macy's Thanksgiving Day Parade.

Wendt continued to portray as the purple dinosaur until the show's hiatus and did a few projects as Barney afterwards until 2013. Wendt reprised his role as Barney in 2019 for Jerry Franklin's retirement gala.

== Personal life ==
On the set of Barney & Friends, Wendt met Lori Plummer who was an educational researcher and content developer of the show. They both got married during the last year the show was being produced in 2010.

== Filmography ==
Barney & Friends:

- 2001: Season 6
  - Macy's Thanksgiving Day Parade (November 22)
- 2002:
  - Season 7
    - We Are Family
    - Barney's Christmas Star (promotional material only)
- 2003:
  - Season 8
- 2004:
  - Season 9
- 2006:
    - Barney's Beach Party (February 7) (uncredited)
  - Season 10
- 2007:
  - Season 11
- 2008:
  - Season 12
- 2009:
  - Season 13

| Preceded by Bob West | Voice of Barney; 2002–2010 | Succeeded by Jonathan Langdon |
