= Jerry Franklin (disambiguation) =

Jerry Franklin is an American football linebacker.

Jerry Franklin may also refer to:

- Jerry Franklin (CEO), President of CPTV
- Jerry F. Franklin (scientist), forest ecologist, see Scientific Integrity in Policymaking

== See also ==
- Jeremy Franklin, Stargate Universe character
