= Everybody's Meg =

- Genre: Comedy, web series
- Created by: Katelyn McCulloch; Maddy Foley; Becky Swannick
- Starring: Maddy Foley; Christian Murray; Martha Irving; Steve Lund; Katelyn McCulloch
- Country of origin: Canada
- Original language: English

Original release
- Network: Bell Fibe TV1
- Release: 2024 – present

Everybody's Meg is a Canadian comedy web series, which premiered in 2024 on Bell Fibe TV1. The series stars Maddy Foley as Meg, an underachieving woman who undertakes a journey of self-discovery after losing her job and being forced to move back in with her parents (Christian Murray and Martha Irving) right on the cusp of her 30th birthday.

The cast also includes Katelyn McCulloch, Gil Anderson, Mary Austin, Sara Campbell, Liam Fair, Kirstin Howell, Marietta Laan, Steve Lund and Jonathan Torrens in supporting roles.

Created by McCulloch, Foley and Becky Swannick, the series is an expansion of Meg Writes a Reference Letter, a short film made by the same trio in 2022.

== Awards ==
Award	Date of ceremony	Category	Recipient(s)	Result	Ref.
Canadian Screen Awards	2025	Best Supporting Performance in a Web Program or Series	Martha Irving	Nominated	
Canadian Screen Awards	2025	Best Direction in a Web Program or Series	Katelyn McCulloch	Nominated	
Canadian Screen Awards	2025	Picture Editing in a Web Program or Series	Becky Swannick	Nominated	
Canadian Screen Awards	2025	Best Writing in a Web Program or Series	Maddy Foley, Katelyn McCulloch "Meg Goes Shopping"	Nominated	
