= Wexford Plaza =

2016 Canadian comedy-drama film

- Directed by: Joyce Wong
- Written by: Joyce Wong
- Produced by: Harry Cherniak; Matt Greyson; Joyce Wong
- Starring: Reid Asselstine; Darrel Gamotin
- Cinematography: Maya Bankovic
- Edited by: Darby MacInnis
- Distributed by: levelFILM
- Release date: November 23, 2016 (Torino)
- Running time: 80 minutes
- Country: Canada
- Language: English

Wexford Plaza is a 2016 Canadian comedy-drama film directed by Joyce Wong and starring Reid Asselstine and Darrel Gamotin.

The film centres on Betty (Reid Asselstine), a lonely young woman who takes a job as a security guard at a strip mall in the Scarborough area of Toronto, and becomes attached to Danny (Darrel Gamotin), a bartender in the mall. Midway through, however, the film shifts to Danny's perspective, retelling the building of their relationship from his side.

The cast also includes Francis Melling, Ellie Posadas, Mirko Miljevic, Mitchell Jaramillo and Ann Paula Bautista.

Although the mall in the film is similarly named to Toronto's real-life Wexford Heights Plaza, the film was actually shot at a closed strip mall in North York.

The film premiered at the Torino Film Festival in 2016, and screened at several film festivals throughout 2017 before having its commercial premiere in Canada in November 2017. The Toronto Film Critics Association named the film as a finalist for the Rogers Best Canadian Film Award at the Toronto Film Critics Association Awards 2017. It was a finalist for the John Dunning Discovery Award at the 6th Canadian Screen Awards. It won the Best Narrative Feature award at the San Diego Asian Film Festival 2017.
