= Jenn Engels =

Canadian television writer and producer

Jenn Engels is a Canadian television writer and producer, most noted as a four-time Gemini and Canadian Screen Award nominee for Best Writing in a Comedy Series.

She is an alumna of the Canadian Film Centre.

== Filmography ==
Year	Series	Credited as		Episodes written
Year	Series	Producer	Writer	Episodes written
2008-2012	Less Than Kind	Yes	Yes	"Reparations and Renewal", "Showtime", "Spring Break", "Fatso Loves Lesbo", "Fun", "Insomnia", "Girl Trouble"
2009	Producing Parker		Yes	1.9
2009	Stoked		Yes	"Dirty Little Secret, Nerdy Little Secret"
2009-2011	Jimmy Two-Shoes		Yes	"Heloise's Wish List", "There Will Be Chocolate", "I Married a Weavil", "Clowns Gone Wild", "Cellphone-itis", "Invasion of the Weavils", "My Best Friend's a Weavil", "Spring Broke", "High School Mule-sical", "Everyone Can Whistle", "The Hooded Chicken", "Heloise's Rival"
2010	18 to Life		Yes	"It's My Party"
2011	Almost Naked Animals		Yes	"What Would Batty Do?"
2011	Dan for Mayor		Yes	"Porktoberfest", "Mayor for a Day", "The Trash Compact"
2011	InSecurity		Yes	"Anger Management", "The Spy Who Fed Me"
2011	My Big Big Friend		Yes	"Derailed/Something Special", "Fort Messy/Beach Blast"
2012	Total Drama: Revenge of the Island		Yes	"Truth or Laser Shark"
2013	Satisfaction	Yes	Yes	"Penis Face Cat Funeral"
2013	Mother Up!		Yes	"Everybody Sees 2Bit's Wang", "The Double D's"
2013-2014	Seed	Yes	Yes	"Mother Sucker", "Mall My Children", "Womb Mates", "Bromosomes", "The Rhythmic Gymnastic Method"
2015-2016	Bitten	Yes	Yes	"Tili Tili Bom", "Our Own Blood", "Dead Meat"
2017	Orphan Black	Yes	Yes	"Ease for Idle Millionaires"
2018	Carter	Yes	Yes	"Happy Campers", "The Farmhand Who Bought the Farm"
2020	Transplant	Yes	Yes	"Saleh"
2021	Sort Of	Yes	Yes	"Sort Of Back"
2022	The Lake	Yes		
2025	Small Achievable Goals		Yes	"Making Work Friends"

== Awards and nominations ==
Year	Award	Category	Work	Result	Ref(s)
2010	Gemini Awards	Best Writing in a Comedy or Variety Program or Series	Less Than Kind	Nominated	
2013	Canadian Screen Awards	Best Writing in a Comedy Series	Less Than Kind	Nominated	
2014	Canadian Screen Awards	Best Writing in a Comedy Series	Satisfaction	Nominated	
2022	Canadian Screen Awards	Best Writing in a Comedy Series	Sort Of	Nominated	
2010	WGC Screenwriting Awards	Best Writing, Episodic Half-Hour	Less Than Kind	Nominated	
2014	WGC Screenwriting Awards	Best Writing, TV Comedy	Less Than Kind	Nominated	
2022	WGC Screenwriting Awards	Best Writing, TV Comedy	Sort Of	Nominated	
