= Dinner with Friends (2025 film) =

2025 Canadian drama film

- Directed by: Sasha Leigh Henry
- Written by: Sasha Leigh Henry; Tania Thompson
- Produced by: Sasha Leigh Henry; Tania Thompson
- Starring: Tattiawna Jones; Izaak Smith; Andrew Bushell; Alex Spencer; Tymika Tafari; Rakhee Morzaria; Michael Ayres; Leighton Alexander Williams
- Cinematography: Grant Cooper
- Edited by: Gloria Tong
- Music by: James M. Findlay
- Production company: Everyday People Productions
- Release date: September 5, 2025 (TIFF)
- Running time: 96 minutes
- Country: Canada
- Language: English

Dinner with Friends is a Canadian drama film, directed by Sasha Leigh Henry and released in 2025.

Her full-length directorial debut, the film centres on a group of eight longtime friends who are now in their mid-30s, and who regularly meet for dinner in an attempt to hold onto their connections in the face of external pressures that seem to be pulling them apart.

Shot on a micro-budget, the film's cast includes Tattiawna Jones, Tymika Tafari, Izaak Smith, Andrew Bushell, Alex Spencer, Rakhee Morzaria, Michael Ayres and Leighton Alexander Williams.

== Plot ==
Joy (Jones) and Malachi (Spencer) are a married couple who miss the regular gatherings they used to have with their core group of friends, and have reinitiated a regular series of dinner parties. Joy resents the fact that the duty of planning and hosting the dinner always falls on her shoulders despite the fact that she and her husband have their hands full with their jobs and children, and want everybody to take turns. Evie (Morzaria) is Joy's best friend, who is still struggling with loneliness and rejection after her boyfriend Tristan (Bushell) left her and seemingly disappeared without a trace, which has also been challenging for Tristan's sister Kat (Tafari).

Paul (Smith) is also stuck in a rut, unable to afford to move into a larger apartment so that he can spend more time with his teenage son. Ty (Ayres) and Josh (Williams), a gay couple, seem to have their lives more together, but are themselves facing questions about whether their freewheeling and partying lifestyle is really what they want out of life. Tensions come to a head at the party, particularly when Tristan actually shows up.

== Distribution ==
The film premiered in the Discovery program at the 2025 Toronto International Film Festival on September 5, 2025.

== Critical response ==
Courtney Small of That Shelf wrote that "Dinner with Friends is most riveting when wading through the thick mud of emotions and personas. Anchored by a riveting script, where the conversations are packed with plenty of humour and hard truths, each new dinner offers new surprises and delicate minefields for characters to navigate. While Henry has always shown a gift when it comes to dialogue, her growth as a visual storyteller is evident here."

For Exclaim!, Rachel Ho wrote that "if Dinner with Friends imparts one message, it's that life comes at you fast. One moment you're doing shrooms, the next you've pulled your hamstring chasing after some no good neighbourhood youths. So enjoy life, come what may, and hold those around you dear."

== Awards ==
The film was shortlisted for the 2025 Jean-Marc Vallée DGC Discovery Award.
