= We Were Wolves =

- Directed by: Jordan Canning
- Written by: Jordan Canning; Steve Cochrane
- Produced by: Jordan Canning; Steve Cochrane
- Starring: Peter Mooney; Steve Cochrane; Lynda Boyd
- Cinematography: Sam Pryse-Phillips
- Edited by: Jon Eagan
- Music by: Igor Correia
- Distributed by: VSC
- Release date: September 13, 2014 (Toronto International Film Festival)
- Running time: 96 minutes
- Country: Canada
- Language: English

We Were Wolves is a 2014 Canadian feature film directed by Jordan Canning, co-written by Jordan Canning and Steve Cochrane, and starring Peter Mooney and Steve Cochrane as estranged brothers dealing with the fallout of their father's death. The film also stars Lynda Boyd, Dan Beirne and Melanie Scrofano.

The film premiered at the 2014 Toronto International Film Festival and is distributed by Video Services Corp.
