= Zaiba Baig =

Canadian writer and actor (born 1995)

- Born: 1995 (age 30–31); Scarborough, Ontario, Canada
- Occupations: Playwright; actor; screenwriter
- Years active: 2018–present

Zaiba Baig (born Bilal Baig, 1995) is a Canadian writer and actor. They (Note: Baig uses both she/her and they/them pronouns interchangeably. This article uses they/them for consistency.) are best known for their play Acha Bacha and CBC series Sort Of (2021–2023).

== Career ==
Acha Bacha, a play which centers on a Pakistani-Canadian non-binary person struggling to reconcile their gender with their Muslim upbringing, was staged in a joint production by Theatre Passe Muraille and Buddies in Bad Times in 2018, and presented at Theatre Passe Muraille Mainspace.

Baig is the co-creator, co-writer, and star of Sort Of, a CBC Television comedy series centering on a genderfluid character. Baig is the first queer South Asian Muslim actor to lead a Canadian primetime television series. The series premiered on CBC in 2021.

Sort Of was the top winner overall in television categories at the 10th Canadian Screen Awards in 2022 and Baig shared the award for Best Writing in a Comedy Series with writing partner Fab Filippo. Baig had declined to submit their performance for 2022 award consideration due to the gendered categories of Best Actor in a Comedy Series and Best Actress in a Comedy Series. Subsequently, the Academy of Canadian Cinema & Television announced that beginning with the 11th Canadian Screen Awards in 2023, gender-neutral awards for Best Performance would be presented instead of gendered actor and actress categories Baig was the winner of the inaugural Canadian Screen Award for Best Leading Performance in a Comedy Series at the 11th Canadian Screen Awards in 2023, in addition to their second award for Best Writing in a Comedy Series, again shared with Fab Fillipo.

In June 2025, Buddies in Bad Times announced the production of Begging Brown Bitch Plays, a show combining Baig's one-act plays Kainchee Lagaa and Jhooti, for the 2025-26 season. It ran from April 1–18, 2026.

== Personal life ==
Baig was raised in Mississauga, Ontario, by Pakistani immigrant parents. Baig is queer, transfeminine, and Muslim. They use both she/her and they/them pronouns. They do not have a close relationship with their parents and only revealed their identity and career to them through email a week before the premiere of Sort Of. Though their parents' reactions were more positive than expected, Baig found it upsetting, stating "No one was really trying to make a deep connection."

Baig mentors emerging queer and trans writers, particularly young women and transfeminine people of colour, and holds writing workshops for youth in underserved Toronto communities. Baig also leads anti-Islamophobia workshops for high schools and founded an online platform for queer and trans South Asians to connect.

In January 2026, Baig stated in a story on their Instagram account that they had changed their name to Zaiba, alongside a request to no longer use their deadname.

== Credits ==
=== Writing ===
==== Television ====
| Year | Title | Notes |
|---|---|---|
| 2021–2023 | Sort Of | 11 episodes; co-creator |

==== Theatre ====
| Year | Title | Director(s) | Theatre |
|---|---|---|---|
| 2018 | Acha Bacha | Brendan Healy | Theatre Passe Muraille |
| 2026 | Kainchee Lagaa | Tawiah M'carthy | Buddies in Bad Times |
| 2026 | Jhooti | Tawiah M'carthy | Buddies in Bad Times |

=== Acting ===
==== Television ====
| Year | Title | Role | Notes |
|---|---|---|---|
| 2021–2023 | Sort Of | Sabi Mehboob | Lead |

==== Film ====
| Year | Title | Role | Notes |
|---|---|---|---|
| 2026 | Neverman | | |

== Accolades ==
| Year | Award | Category | Nominee(s) | Result | Ref. |
|---|---|---|---|---|---|
| 2022 | Gotham Independent Film Awards | Outstanding Performance in a New Series | Zaiba Baig | Nominated | |
| 2022 | Peabody Awards | Entertainment | Sort Of | Nominated | |
| 2022 | Dayne Ogilvie Prize | LGBTQ2S+ Emerging Writers | Zaiba Baig for Acha Bacha | Nominated | |
| 2022 | 10th Canadian Screen Awards | Best Writing, Comedy | Zaiba Baig, Fab Filippo | Won | |
| 2023 | 11th Canadian Screen Awards | Best Lead Performer, Comedy | Zaiba Baig | Won | |
| 2023 | 11th Canadian Screen Awards | Best Writing, Comedy | Zaiba Baig, Fab Filippo | Won | |
