= One More Time (2024 TV series) =

Canadian television sitcom

- Genre: Sitcom
- Starring: D.J. Demers; Geri Hall; Dan Beirne; Elise Bauman; Seran Sathiyaseelan; Dayton Sinkia
- Country of origin: Canada
- No. of seasons: 1
- No. of episodes: 13

Production
- Production company: Counterfeit Pictures

Original release
- Network: CBC Television
- Release: January 9 – April 2, 2024

One More Time is a Canadian television sitcom produced by Accessible Media Inc. that premiered on January 9, 2024 on CBC Television.

== Cast and characters ==
=== Main ===
- D.J. Demers as D.J., the hard-of-hearing manager of a small used sporting goods store.
- Geri Hall as assistant manager Cynthia
- Dan Beirne as undermotivated employee Wayne
- Elise Bauman as employee and Olympic hopeful Jen
- Seran Sathiyaseelan as new part-time employee Keeran
- Dayton Sinkia as security guard Chris

=== Supporting ===
- Nadine Bhabha as Gwen
- Chris Robinson as Josh
- Maddy Foley as Nat
- Marito Lopez as Carlito

== Production ==
Demers said the series was inspired by his own teenage job at a Play It Again Sports store; the show essentially represented what his own life might have been like if he had stayed in that job instead of moving on.

The show received attention for its media representation of people with disabilities, as it premiered around the same time as Sight Unseen, a drama series about a visually-impaired police officer. The fourth episode, "Mis-Interpretation", centers on a storyline in which D.J., who is hearing-impaired but able to hear and speak with the use of hearing aids, is set up on a blind date with a woman who is fully deaf and communicates using sign language, necessitating a chain of multiple sign language interpreters to relay conversation between D.J. and his date.

== Episodes ==
No.	Title	Directed by	Written by	Original release date
1	"Unselfish UnSaturday"	Melanie Orr	D.J. Demers & Jessie Gabe	January 9, 2024
2	"Rocket Richard's Skates"	Melanie Orr	D.J. Demers & Jessie Gabe	January 16, 2024
3	"Chris Gets Hired"	Melanie Orr	Chris Robinson	January 23, 2024
4	"Mis-Interpretation"	Melanie Orr	Dane Clark	January 30, 2024
5	"Brittle by Brittle"	Cory Bowles	Dane Clark	February 6, 2024
6	"Bed Bugs"	Yael Staav	Rob Michaels	February 13, 2024
7	"Lazer Blade"	Yael Staav	Jessie Gabe	February 20, 2024
8	"The New Deaf Girl"	Yael Staav	Jessie Gabe	February 27, 2024
9	"Ah Néro"	Jessie Gabe	Jackie Batsinduka	March 5, 2024
10	"Curs-ed"	Cory Bowles	Martina Monro	March 12, 2024
11	"Near Deaf Experience"	Cory Bowles	Rob Michaels & Martina Monro	March 19, 2024
12	"The Smiley Face Bandit"	Cory Bowles	D.J. Demers	March 26, 2024
13	"The Incident"	Yael Staav	D.J. Demers	April 2, 2024

== Awards ==
Award	Date of ceremony	Category	Recipient	Result	Ref.
Canadian Screen Awards	2025	Best Comedy Series	Dan Bennett, Shane Corkery, Anton Leo, D.J. Demers, Jessie Gabe, Dane Clark, Melanie Orr, Colin Brunton	Nominated	
Canadian Screen Awards	2025	Best Leading Performance in a Comedy Series	Dan Beirne	Nominated	
Canadian Screen Awards	2025	Best Leading Performance in a Comedy Series	D.J. Demers	Nominated	
Canadian Screen Awards	2025	Best Supporting Performance in a Comedy Series	Maddy Foley	Nominated	
Canadian Screen Awards	2025	Best Performance in a Guest Role in a Comedy Series	Marito Lopez	Nominated	
Canadian Screen Awards	2025	Best Performance in a Guest Role in a Comedy Series	Connie Wang	Nominated	
Canadian Screen Awards	2025	Best Ensemble Performance in a Comedy Series	D.J. Demers, Geri Hall, Elise Bauman, Dan Beirne, Seran Sathiyaseelan, Dayton Sinkia, Maddy Foley	Nominated	
Canadian Screen Awards	2025	Best Original Music, Comedy	Peter Chapman	Nominated	
Canadian Screen Awards	2025	Best Writing in a Comedy Series	Jessie Gabe, "The New Deaf Girl"	Nominated	
