= Fab Filippo =

Canadian actor (born 1973)

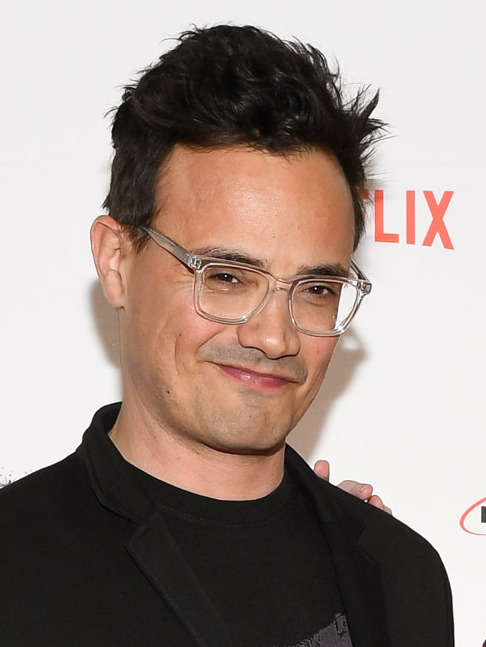
- Filippo in February 2020
- Born: Fabrizio Filippo; November 30, 1973 (age 52); Toronto, Ontario, Canada
- Occupations: Actor, writer, director
- Years active: 1990–present
- Spouse: Robin Payne (2006–2019)

Fabrizio "Fab" Filippo (born November 30, 1973) is a Canadian actor.

== Personal life ==
Filippo was born in Toronto, Ontario, Canada. His parents are first generation Italian immigrants (his mother is from Campora San Giovanni in Calabria). He briefly attended York University's Film & Video Programme in 1993. In 2006, Filippo married magazine editor Robin Payne, and together they have a son.

== Career ==
His best-known roles include Scott Hope in Buffy the Vampire Slayer, violinist Ethan Gold in Queer as Folk, Dom Ramone in Ready or Not and lawyer Sam Caponelli in Billable Hours, as well as the films waydowntown, The Life Before This and Lives of the Saints. He played the lead role, Roland Travis, in the short lived series Level 9. He also appeared as Johnny, an adolescent who believes he is being stalked by a ghost, in an episode of the popular Nickelodeon series Are You Afraid of the Dark?

Filippo is also active in the Toronto theatre community and focuses on writing for stage and screen. He says, "I think it's just the next phase in my career." He played a significant role in the "monster band", a collaborative band effort that opened Mel Lastman Square.

In 2017, he created and starred in the comedy-drama web series Save Me. He received three Canadian Screen Award nominations for his work on the series, in the categories of Best Actor in a Drama Program or Limited Series, Best Direction in a Drama Program or Limited Series and Best Writing in a Drama Program or Limited Series, at the 7th Canadian Screen Awards in 2019.

He was a co-creator with Zaiba Baig of the series Sort Of, for which he won a Canadian Screen Award for Best Writing in a Comedy Series at the 10th Canadian Screen Awards in 2022, and awards for both Best Writing in a Comedy Series and Best Direction in a Comedy Series at the 11th Canadian Screen Awards in 2023.

== Filmography ==
Film
Year	Title	Role	Notes
1992	Prom Night IV: Deliver Us from Evil	Jonathan	
1995	Canadian Bacon	Candy Striper #2	
1996	The Drive	Ted	
1999	The Life Before This	Michael	
2000	Waydowntown	Tom Bennett	
2003	Hollywood North	Frankie Candido	
2004	The Human Kazoo	Adult Anthony	Short film
2005	Love Is Work	Victor	
2006	Couldn't Be Happier	Ed	Short film
2009	A Good Meal	Butcher	
2012	Perfect Sisters	Ashley's Lawyer	
2012	The Resurrection of Tony Gitone	Nino	

Television
Year	Title	Role	Notes
1990	Katts and Dog		Episode: "Kidnapped"
1992	Beyond Reality		Episode: "A Mind of Their Own"
1993	Street Legal	Francisco Mendez	Episode: "Forgiveness"; Episode: "The Price"
1993–1997	Ready or Not	Dom Ramone	19 episodes
1994	Are You Afraid of the Dark?	Johnny Angelli	Episode: "The Tale of the Dream Girl"
1994	The Mighty Jungle	Brian	Episode: "The Test Kit"
1994	Due South	Lenny Milano	Episode: "Pizzas and Promises"
1994	Against Their Will: Women in Prison	Jason	TV movie
1995	TekWar	Fab	Episode: "Cyberhunt"
1996	Flash Forward	Zach Anderson	Episode: "House Party"
1996	Liszt's Rhapsody	Janka	TV movie
1996	Radiant City	Johnny	TV movie
1996	Dangerous Minds	Justin	Episode: "Pilot"
1996	Lush Life	Hamilton Ford Foster	7 episodes
1997	Cracker: Mind Over Murder	Frank	Episode: "True Romance: Part 1"
1998	Hollyweird	Charlie	TV movie
1998	Poltergeist: The Legacy	Ethan Adams	Episode: "The Enlightened One"
1998	Buffy the Vampire Slayer	Scott Hope	3 episodes
1998	Reunited	Bo Bruener	Episode: "Where Is Joanne Going, and When?"
1999	Providence	Marcello	Episode: "Tying the Not"
1999	Undressed	Michael	4 episodes
1999–2000	Action	Holden Van Dorn	6 episodes
2000–2001	Level 9	Roland Travis	12 episodes
2002–2003	Queer as Folk	Ethan Gold	10 episodes
2004	Lives of the Saints	Vittorio Innocente	TV miniseries
2005	Tilt	Dean Whitmark	5 episodes
2005	Puppets Who Kill	Rodney	Episode: "Dan and the New Neighbour"
2005–2006	Delilah & Julius	Julius Chevalier (voice)	34 episodes
2006–2008	Billable Hours	Sam Capponelli	26 episodes
2007	Sybil	Ramon	TV movie
2008	Rent-a-Goalie	Sam Capponelli	Episode: "The Cheesemaker's Oath"
2009–2010	Being Erica	Seth Newman	5 episodes
2009–2010	The Dating Guy	Mark Dexler / Father McFaddin (voice)	26 episodes
2011–2015	Detentionaire	Camillio Martinez (voice)	Recurring role
2011–2012	The Adventures of Chuck and Friends	Digger (voice)	Recurring role
2017	Save Me	Goldie	
2021	Sort Of	Co-creator	with Bilal Baig

=== Accolades ===
Year	Award	Category	Nominee(s)	Result	Ref.
2022	Peabody Awards	Entertainment	Sort Of	Won	

Year	Award	Category	Nominee(s)	Result	Ref.
2023	Peabody Awards	Entertainment	Sort Of	Nominated	
