= Game On (Canadian TV series) =

- Genre: Teen sitcom
- Starring: Grayson Gurnsey; Jonathan Torrens; Samantha Bee
- Country of origin: Canada
- No. of seasons: 1

Production
- Production locations: Montreal, Quebec
- Production company: Ad Lib Films

Original release
- Network: YTV
- Release: May 4, 2015 – May 27, 2016

Game On is a Canadian teen sitcom, which premiered on YTV in May 2015.

Based on the Norwegian series Kampen, the show stars Grayson Gurnsey as Toby Martin, a 14-year-old boy whose successes and failures in life are narrated in the style of a sports play-by-play by an anchor team played by Jonathan Torrens and Samantha Bee.

== Cast ==
=== Main ===
- Grayson Gurnsey as Toby Martin
- Jonathan Torrens as Bob
- Samantha Bee as Geri

=== Recurring ===
- Jamie Mayers as Seth Millwood
- Jonathan Langdon as Wilf Aldershot
