= Laura Ramoso =

German-Italian comedian

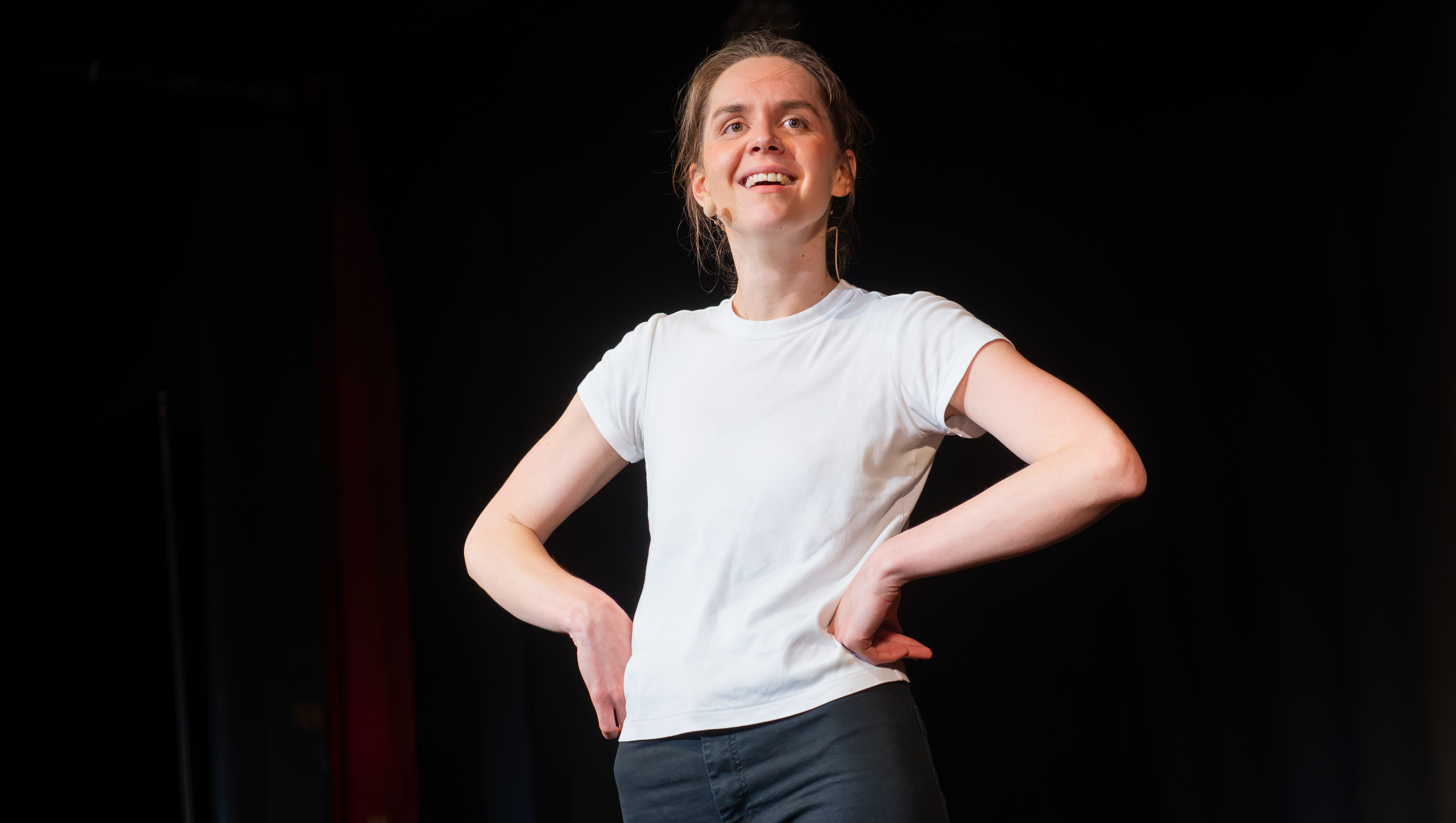
- Ramoso performing at the Leicester Square Theatre in 2024
- Born: October 1995 (age 31); Legnago, Verona, Italy
- Education: University of Victoria (BFA)
- Occupation: Comedian
- Spouse: Gaelan McMillan (m. 2019)
- Website: lauraramoso.com

Laura Ramoso (born October 1995) is a German-Italian comedian based in Canada.

== Early life ==
Ramoso was born in Legnago, Italy to a German mother and Italian father. As a child, Ramoso lived abroad in several countries — Cameroon, Azerbaijan, China and Vietnam — due to her mother’s career with the World Health Organization. Ramoso moved to Canada to attend the University of Victoria, graduating in 2016 with a BFA in Theatre.

Ramoso was a sixth season member of The Bad Dog Theatre Company’s Featured Players Program.

== Career ==
In 2020, Ramoso premiered her first written solo special, diane, with The Bad Dog. The show used "physical comedy, clown and satire" to perform as various women named Diane.

In 2022, Ramoso went viral with a series of videos depicting American tourists detailing their travels to European countries. That year, she debuted her live improv comedy show, Laura Ramoso & Friends, at the Social Capital Theatre in Toronto. She also appeared in the fourth season episode “The Night Market” of the comedy horror series What We Do in the Shadows.

Ramoso performed her second show, Frances, at the 2023 Edinburgh Fringe Festival and the London Soho Theatre. Playing multiple characters, Frances was described as “a densely populated show featuring sketches, improv, character-comedy and a fragmented comic play.” Also in 2023, she was named a Just for Laughs New Face of Comedy.

In 2024, Ramoso went on her first international tour with her third special, Sit Up Straight.

In late 2025, Ramoso announced a second tour for her fourth comedy special, Calm Down, to premiere in early 2026.

== Personal life ==
In December 2019, Ramoso eloped with her longtime boyfriend, Gaelan McMillan. On 22 June 2024, they had an official ceremony.
