= Canadian Screen Award for Best Supporting Actor in a Comedy Series =

Discontinued annual Canadian media award

The Canadian Screen Award for Best Supporting Actor in Comedy Series is an annual Canadian television award, presented by the Academy of Canadian Cinema and Television to the best performance by an actor in a supporting role in a Canadian television comedy series.

The award was first presented in 2011. Prior to that date, the Academy presented awards for Individual Performance in a Comedy Series and Ensemble Performance in a Comedy Series, differentiating neither by gender nor for the distinction between lead and supporting performances.

In August 2022, the Academy announced that beginning with the 11th Canadian Screen Awards in 2023, a gender-neutral award for Best Supporting Performance in a Comedy Series will be presented.

== 2010s ==
| Year | Actor | Series | Ref |
|---|---|---|---|
2011; 26th Gemini Awards
| 2011; 26th Gemini Awards | Ernie Grunwald | Call Me Fitz | |
| 2011; 26th Gemini Awards | Joe Cobden | Living in Your Car | |
| 2011; 26th Gemini Awards | Colin Cunningham | Living in Your Car | |
| 2011; 26th Gemini Awards | Peter Donaldson | Living in Your Car | |
| 2011; 26th Gemini Awards | Peter MacNeill | Call Me Fitz | |
2012; 1st Canadian Screen Awards
| 2012; 1st Canadian Screen Awards | Stuart Margolin | Call Me Fitz | |
| 2012; 1st Canadian Screen Awards | Benjamin Ayres | Less Than Kind | |
| 2012; 1st Canadian Screen Awards | Tyler Johnston | Less Than Kind | |
| 2012; 1st Canadian Screen Awards | Ross McMillan | Less Than Kind | |
| 2012; 1st Canadian Screen Awards | Jason Weinberg | Good God | |
2013; 2nd Canadian Screen Awards
| 2013; 2nd Canadian Screen Awards | Nicholas Campbell | Less Than Kind | |
| 2013; 2nd Canadian Screen Awards | Andrew Cheng | Gavin Crawford's Wild West | |
| 2013; 2nd Canadian Screen Awards | Colin Cunningham | Less Than Kind | |
| 2013; 2nd Canadian Screen Awards | Tyler Johnston | Less Than Kind | |
| 2013; 2nd Canadian Screen Awards | Pat Thornton | Satisfaction | |
2014; 3rd Canadian Screen Awards
| 2014; 3rd Canadian Screen Awards | Jonathan Torrens | Mr. D | |
| 2014; 3rd Canadian Screen Awards | Marty Adams | Spun Out | |
| 2014; 3rd Canadian Screen Awards | Elliott Gould | Sensitive Skin | |
| 2014; 3rd Canadian Screen Awards | Peter MacNeill | Call Me Fitz | |
| 2014; 3rd Canadian Screen Awards | Jay Malone | Package Deal | |
2015; 4th Canadian Screen Awards
| 2015; 4th Canadian Screen Awards | Chris Elliott | Schitt's Creek | |
| 2015; 4th Canadian Screen Awards | Mark Little | Mr. D | |
| 2015; 4th Canadian Screen Awards | Atticus Mitchell | Young Drunk Punk | |
| 2015; 4th Canadian Screen Awards | Al Mukadam | Spun Out | |
| 2015; 4th Canadian Screen Awards | Darrin Rose | Mr. D | |
2016; 5th Canadian Screen Awards
| 2016; 5th Canadian Screen Awards | Andrew Phung | Kim's Convenience | |
| 2016; 5th Canadian Screen Awards | Nathan Dales | Letterkenny | |
| 2016; 5th Canadian Screen Awards | John Hemphill | Schitt's Creek | |
| 2016; 5th Canadian Screen Awards | Ryan McDonald | What Would Sal Do? | |
| 2016; 5th Canadian Screen Awards | Jonathan Torrens | Mr. D | |
2017; 6th Canadian Screen Awards
| 2017; 6th Canadian Screen Awards | Andrew Phung | Kim's Convenience | |
| 2017; 6th Canadian Screen Awards | Dan Aykroyd | Workin' Moms | |
| 2017; 6th Canadian Screen Awards | Peter Keleghan | Workin' Moms | |
| 2017; 6th Canadian Screen Awards | Noah Reid | Schitt's Creek | |
| 2017; 6th Canadian Screen Awards | K. Trevor Wilson | Letterkenny | |
2018; 7th Canadian Screen Awards
| 2018; 7th Canadian Screen Awards | Noah Reid | Schitt's Creek | |
| 2018; 7th Canadian Screen Awards | Chris Elliott | Schitt's Creek | |
| 2018; 7th Canadian Screen Awards | Ennis Esmer | Private Eyes | |
| 2018; 7th Canadian Screen Awards | Peter Keleghan | Workin' Moms | |
| 2018; 7th Canadian Screen Awards | Colin Mochrie | Tiny Plastic Men | |
2019; 8th Canadian Screen Awards
| 2019; 8th Canadian Screen Awards | Andrew Phung | Kim's Convenience | |
| 2019; 8th Canadian Screen Awards | Chris Elliott | Schitt's Creek | |
| 2019; 8th Canadian Screen Awards | Mark Forward | Letterkenny | |
| 2019; 8th Canadian Screen Awards | Dustin Milligan | Schitt's Creek | |
| 2019; 8th Canadian Screen Awards | Noah Reid | Schitt's Creek | |

== 2020s ==
| Year | Actor | Series | Ref |
|---|---|---|---|
2020; 9th Canadian Screen Awards
| 2020; 9th Canadian Screen Awards | Andrew Phung | Kim's Convenience | |
| 2020; 9th Canadian Screen Awards | Ryan Belleville | Workin' Moms | |
| 2020; 9th Canadian Screen Awards | Chris Elliott | Schitt's Creek | |
| 2020; 9th Canadian Screen Awards | Peter Keleghan | Workin' Moms | |
| 2020; 9th Canadian Screen Awards | Noah Reid | Schitt's Creek | |
2021; 10th Canadian Screen Awards
| 2021; 10th Canadian Screen Awards | Andrew Phung | Kim's Convenience | |
| 2021; 10th Canadian Screen Awards | Ryan Belleville | Workin' Moms | |
| 2021; 10th Canadian Screen Awards | Peter Keleghan | Workin' Moms | |
| 2021; 10th Canadian Screen Awards | Al Mukadam | Pretty Hard Cases | |
| 2021; 10th Canadian Screen Awards | Jonathan Torrens | Vollies | |
