= TV with TV's Jonathan Torrens =

- Starring: Jonathan Torrens
- Country of origin: Canada
- No. of seasons: 3
- No. of episodes: 65

Production
- Running time: 30 minutes

Original release
- Network: TVtropolis
- Release: October 9, 2009 – October 21, 2011

TV with TV's Jonathan Torrens was a Canadian comedic newsmagazine-styled television program that debuted on the TVtropolis network on October 9, 2009. The show features Jonathan Torrens of Trailer Park Boys and Street Cents fame "break(ing) down the complicated scope of television by dissecting the stars, formats and genres of today’s (television) broadcasts".

The show ended its run in 2011 at 65 episodes.
