= Jonathan Langdon =

Canadian actor (born 1987)

- Born: December 17, 1987 (age 38); Pickering, Ontario, Canada
- Occupation: Actor
- Years active: 2013–present
- Notable work: Run the Burbs; Zombies; NOS4A2; Barney's World

Jonathan Langdon (born December 17, 1987) is a Canadian actor from Pickering, Ontario, best known for his supporting role as Hudson in the television series Run the Burbs.

== Career ==
His credits include the film Trap, television series Run the Burbs and Game On, Utopia Falls, NOS4A2 and Robyn Hood, the Zombies films and Zombies: The Re-Animated Series, and the television film Faith Heist. He was also formerly part of the sketch comedy troupe The Sketchersons, and the sketch comedy duo Hackett & Langdon with Brandon Hackett.

Langdon is also voicing Barney the Dinosaur in the 2024 animated series Barney's World.

== Personal life ==
He was a triple Canadian Screen Award nominee at the 12th Canadian Screen Awards in 2024, receiving nods for Best Supporting Performance in a Comedy Series for Run the Burbs, Best Performance in a Television Film or Miniseries for Faith Heist: A Christmas Caper, and Ensemble Performance in a Drama Series for Robyn Hood.

== Filmography ==
=== Film ===
Year	Title	Role
2017	Christmas Inheritance	Bus Driver
2019	Buffaloed	Chris Stephens
2024	Trap	Jamie

=== Television ===
Year	Title	Role	Notes
2015–2016	Game On	Wilf Aldershot	7 episodes
2018	Zombies	Coach	Television movie
2019	Bit Playas	Jamaican Employee	Episode: "Shopping Day"
2019–2020	NOS4A2	Lou Carmody	11 episodes
2020	Zombies 2	Coach	Television movie
2020	Utopia Falls	Regget	7 episodes Credited as Jonathan Marcus Langdon
2021	Faith Heist	Benjamin Wright	Television movie
2022–2024	Run the Burbs	Hudson Hawkesley	Recurring cast
2022	Zombies 3	Coach	Television movie
2022	Faith Heist: A Christmas Caper	Benjamin Wright	Television movie
2023–present	Rubble & Crew	Shopkeeper Shelley (voice)	Recurring cast
2023–2024	Open Season: Call of Nature	Boog (voice)	Lead role
2024–2025	Barney's World	Barney (voice)	Lead role
2024	Zombies: The Re-Animated Series	Coach/Additional Voices (voice)	Recurring cast
2025	Mermicorno: Starfall	Nautique/Sawtooth (voice)	Lead role
2026	Phoebe & Jay	Pete (voice)	Lead role

Preceded by Dean Wendt	Voice of Barney; 2024–present	Succeeded by N/A
