= Sort Of (TV series) =

Canadian television sitcom

- Genre: Comedy-drama
- Created by: Zaiba Baig; Fab Filippo
- Starring: Zaiba Baig; Gray Powell; Ellora Patnaik; Amanda Cordner; Supinder Wraich; Gregory Ambrose Calderone; Kaya Kanashiro; Aden Bedard; Becca Blackwell; Grace Lynn Kung; Alanna Bale; Varun Saranga; Cassandra James
- Country of origin: Canada
- No. of seasons: 3
- No. of episodes: 24

Production
- Executive producers: Jennifer Kawaja; Julia Sereny; Bruno Dube; Zaiba Baig; Fab Filippo; Laura Perlmutter; Ian Iqbal Rashid
- Producers: Jessica Daniel; Andrea Glinski; Elise Cousineau
- Production locations: Toronto, Ontario
- Running time: 21–22 minutes
- Production company: Sienna Films

Original release
- Network: CBC Television
- Release: November 9, 2021 – December 8, 2023

Sort Of is a Canadian comedy drama television series, released on CBC Television beginning in 2021. Created by Zaiba Baig and Fab Filippo, the series stars Baig as Sabi Mehboob, a non-binary millennial trying to balance their roles as a child of Pakistani immigrant parents, a bartender at an LGBTQ bookstore and café, and a caregiver to the young children of a professional couple.

The show aired on CBC Television and CBC Gem in Canada and on HBO Max in the U.S., and ran for three seasons. The series received positive reviews from critics and was the most-nominated television series at the 10th Canadian Screen Awards. The show has won Best Comedy Series at the Canadian Screen Awards twice and won a Peabody Award.

In October 2023, it was announced that the third season would also be the last. Season three started broadcasting on November 17 on CBC and the final episode was released on December 8.

== Cast and characters ==
- Zaiba Baig as Sabi Mehboob:
  A first generation Pakistani-Canadian trying to navigate life as they embrace their non-binary identity and combat the cultural expectations that have been put upon them, all while grappling with the severe injuries that their friend and employer, Bessy, has suffered.
- Gray Powell as Paul Bauer:
  Sabi's employer and husband to Bessy. He is a therapist who ironically has trouble noticing his own family's needs and struggles as well as his own. Much like Sabi, he is left to walk on his own path of self discovery and exploration in the wake of his wife's accident, often questioning how much he really knows about the lives of Bessy and their children.
- Kaya Kanashiro as Violet Kaneko-Bauer:
  Bessy and Paul's daughter and oldest child. She is entering a stage of rebellion as her mother's accident becomes increasingly more difficult to deal with emotionally.
- Aden Bedard as Henry Kaneko-Bauer:
  Bessy and Paul's son and youngest child. He is a mostly quiet kid who spends more time glued to his devices than looking up at people's faces.
- Amanda Cordner as 7ven:
  Sabi's best friend and confidant. When the opportunity to move to Berlin for a job in the art world arises, they invite Sabi to join on this new adventure in the "queer capital of the world" and leave their lives behind. 7ven is always pushing Sabi to embrace their identity and focus on their own needs rather than the needs of others. They don't always approve of how much Sabi's nannying consumes their life, but is always there to lend a hand when asked.
- Grace Lynn Kung as Bessy Kaneko:
  Sabi's employer and friend. An intellectual who feels constrained by the mold society imposes on a mother and a wife. Early in the series she has a biking accident which causes her to fall into a coma.
- Ellora Patnaik as Raffo Mehboob:
  Sabi and Aqsa's mother. A Pakistani immigrant living on her own as her two grown children have long moved out and her husband lives overseas. Though he may not be physically present, her husband–and the cultural values he represents–looms over her as she tries to understand her children better and, in the process, understand herself.
- Supinder Wraich as Aqsa Mehboob:
  Sabi's sister and roommate. Like her sibling, Aqsa tries to break away from her strict upbringing. She forms part of Sabi's support system, though at times their views on navigating their family's expectations and cultural beliefs differ.
- Gregory Ambrose Calderone as Lewis:
  Sabi's love interest at the onset of the series. He attempts to maintain a relationship with them while simultaneously feeling conflicted/ashamed of his partner's gender identity.

Supporting cast also includes Becca Blackwell (Deenzie), Alanna Bale (Mackenzie), Amanda Brugel (Gaia), Cassandra James (Olympia), Varun Saranga (Izzy).

== Production ==
Sort Of was written by Baig, Filippo, Jenn Engels, Nelu Handa and Ian Iqbal Rashid, and directed by Filippo and Renuka Jeyapalan. Ian Iqbal Rashid and Jenn Engels were also co-executive producers.

The bookstore where Sabi works was inspired by Toronto's Glad Day Bookshop, an LGBTQ bookstore and café in the Church and Wellesley village, although the bookstore scenes in the series were filmed in a vacant space on Queen Street West.

== Release ==
The series launched on CBC Gem on 5 October 2021, in advance of its television premiere on 9 November. In advance of the CBC Gem launch, selected episodes received a preview screening in the Primetime program at the 2021 Toronto International Film Festival. In the United States, HBO Max picked up the series and premiered on 18 November 2021. The series has also been picked up by Sky Comedy in the United Kingdom, Stan in Australia (available from October 5), and M6 in France.

== Episodes ==
Season	Episodes	Originally released		
Season	Episodes	First released	Last released	Network
1	8	November 9, 2021	November 30, 2021	CBC
2	8	November 15, 2022	December 6, 2022	CBC
3	8	November 17, 2023	December 8, 2023	CBC Gem

=== Season 1 (2021) ===
No. overall	No. in season	Title	Directed by	Written by	Original release date (Note: All episodes were released on CBC Gem on 5 October 2021, ahead of their linear premieres on CBC Television. Episodes 3–8 were initially made available only to subscribers to CBC Gem's paid Premium tier.)
1	1	"Sort of Gone"	Fab Filippo	Zaiba Baig & Fab Filippo	November 9, 2021
2	2	"Sort of Back"	Fab Filippo	Jenn Engels	November 9, 2021
3	3	"Sort of Mary Poppins"	Fab Filippo	Ian Iqbal Rashid	November 16, 2021
4	4	"Sort of Stable"	Fab Filippo	Nelu Handa	November 16, 2021
5	5	"Sort of a Party"	Renuka Jeyapalan	Zaiba Baig & Fab Filippo	November 23, 2021
6	6	"Sort of Ellen"	Renuka Jeyapalan	Zaiba Baig	November 23, 2021
7	7	"Sort of a Miracle"	Fab Filippo	Ian Iqbal Rashid	November 30, 2021
8	8	"Sort of Back Again"	Fab Filippo	Zaiba Baig & Fab Filippo	November 30, 2021

=== Season 2 (2022) ===
No. overall	No. in season	Title	Directed by	Written by	Original release date
9	1	"Sort of Future"	Fab Filippo	Zaiba Baig & Fab Filippo	November 15, 2022
10	2	"Sort of 2gethr"	Fab Filippo	Jenn Engels	November 15, 2022
11	3	"Sort of Broke"	Fab Filippo	JP Larocque	November 22, 2022
12	4	"Sort of Who She Is"	Joyce Wong	Ian Iqbal Rashid	November 22, 2022
13	5	"Sort of Amsterdam"	Joyce Wong	Kyah Green & Léa Geronimo Rondot	November 29, 2022
14	6	"Sort of I Love You"	Joyce Wong	Zaiba Baig & Fab Filippo	November 29, 2022
15	7	"Sort of Opening"	J Stevens	Jenn Engels	December 6, 2022
16	8	"Sort of Janazah"	Fab Filippo	Zaiba Baig & Fab Filippo	December 6, 2022

=== Season 3 (2023) ===
No. overall	No. in season	Title	Directed by	Written by	Original release date
17	1	"Sort of Aftermath"	Fab Filippo	Zaiba Baig & Fab Filippo	November 17, 2023
18	2	"Sort of Chaaliswan"	Shamim Sarif	Ian Iqbal Rashid	November 17, 2023
19	3	"The Sort of Truth"	Shamim Sarif	Fab Filippo	November 24, 2023
20	4	"Sort of Married"	Shamim Sarif	Ian Iqbal Rashid	November 24, 2023
21	5	"Sort of the Worst Yoda"	Fab Filippo	Zaiba Baig	December 1, 2023
22	6	"Sort of Hospital Again"	Fab Filippo	Tricia Fish	December 1, 2023
23	7	"Sort of Anything You Want"	Shamim Sarif	Zaiba Baig & Fab Filippo	December 8, 2023
24	8	"Sort of Gone Again"	Fab Filippo	Zaiba Baig & Fab Filippo	December 8, 2023

== Reception ==
=== Critical reception ===
The first season received positive reviews from critics. On the review aggregation website Rotten Tomatoes, the season holds an approval rating of 100% with an average rating of 8.6 out of 10, based on 12 reviews. The second season holds an approval rating of 100% with an average rating of 8.0 out of 10, based on 6 reviews.

=== Accolades ===
Sort Of was nominated for the Outstanding New TV Series category for the 33rd GLAAD Media Awards in 2022. It also received a Peabody Award in the Entertainment category in 2022.

It was the most-nominated television series at the 10th Canadian Screen Awards in 2022, with 13 nominations. It won the award for Best Comedy Series. It was also shortlisted for the fan-voted Audience Choice Award.

Award	Date of ceremony	Category	Recipient(s)	Result	Ref(s)
GLAAD Media Award	2022	Outstanding New TV Series	Sort Of	Nominated	
GLAAD Media Award	2023	Outstanding Comedy Series	Sort Of	Nominated	
GLAAD Media Award	2025	Outstanding Comedy Series	Sort Of	Nominated	
Gotham Awards	2022	Outstanding Performance in a New Series	Zaiba Baig	Nominated	
Canadian Screen Awards	2022	Best Comedy Series	Zaiba Baig, Fab Filippo, Jennifer Kawaja, Julia Sereny, Bruno Dubé	Won	
Canadian Screen Awards	2022	Best Direction in a Comedy Series	Renuka Jeyapalan — "Sort Of a Party"	Nominated	
Canadian Screen Awards	2022	Best Direction in a Comedy Series	Fab Filippo — "Sort Of Mary Poppins"	Nominated	
Canadian Screen Awards	2022	Best Writing in a Comedy Series	Jenn Engels — "Sort Of Back"	Nominated	
Canadian Screen Awards	2022	Best Writing in a Comedy Series	Zaiba Baig, Fab Filippo — "Sort Of Gone"	Won	
Canadian Screen Awards	2022	Best Writing in a Comedy Series	Ian Iqbal Rashid — "Sort Of Mary Poppins"	Nominated	
Canadian Screen Awards	2022	Best Photography in a Comedy Series	Stephen Reizes — "Sort Of Stable"	Nominated	
Canadian Screen Awards	2022	Best Picture Editing in a Comedy Series	Sam Thomson, Craig Webster — "Sort of Stable"	Nominated	
Canadian Screen Awards	2022	Best Sound, Fiction	Daryl Purdy, Paul Germann, Martin Gwynn Jones, Graham Rogers, Kevin Schultz, Jenna Dalla Riva, Goro Koyama — "Sort Of Miracle"	Nominated	
Canadian Screen Awards	2022	Best Production Design or Art Direction, Fiction	Chris Crane, Joël Guzman — "Sort Of a Party"	Nominated	
Canadian Screen Awards	2022	Best Costume Design	Shelley Mansell — "Sort Of Back Again"	Nominated	
Canadian Screen Awards	2022	Best Makeup	Jessica Carter, Steve Newburn — "Sort Of Back Again"	Won	
Canadian Screen Awards	2022	Best Casting, Fiction	Jon Comerford	Nominated	
Canadian Screen Awards	2022	Audience Choice Award	Sort Of	Nominated	
Canadian Screen Awards	2023	Best Comedy Series	Jennifer Kawaja, Bruno Dubé, Zaiba Baig, Fab Filippo	Won	
Canadian Screen Awards	2023	Best Lead Performance, Comedy	Zaiba Baig	Won	
Canadian Screen Awards	2023	Best Supporting Performance, Comedy	Amanda Cordner	Nominated	
Canadian Screen Awards	2023	Performance in a guest role in a comedy series	Amanda Brugel	Won	
Canadian Screen Awards	2023	Best Costume Design	Crystal Silden — "Sort Of 2gethr"	Nominated	
Canadian Screen Awards	2023	Best Production Design/Art Direction in a Fiction Program or Series	Ingrid Jurek, M-A Orenstein, Jenn Luckas — "Sort Of Janazah"	Nominated	
Canadian Screen Awards	2023	Best Editing in a Comedy Program or Series	Hugh Elchuk — "Sort Of Amsterdam"	Nominated	
Canadian Screen Awards	2023	Best Editing in a Comedy Program or Series	Marianna Khoury — "Sort Of 2gethr"	Won	
Canadian Screen Awards	2023	Best Sound in a Fiction Program or Series	Paul Germann, Martin Gwynn Jones, Rob Ainsley, Bryan Day, Graham Rogers, Goro Koyama, Jenna Dalla Riva — "Sort Of Future"	Nominated	
Canadian Screen Awards	2023	Best Direction, Comedy	Fab Filippo — "Sort Of Janazah"	Won	
Canadian Screen Awards	2023	Best Direction, Comedy	Joyce Wong — "Sort Of I Love You"	Nominated	
Canadian Screen Awards	2023	Best Original Music, Comedy	Ceréna, Emily Persich, Moël, Terrell Morris, Shan Vincent de Paul, Vivek Shraya	Won	
Canadian Screen Awards	2023	Best Original Song	Emily Persich — "Superpowers"	Nominated	
Canadian Screen Awards	2023	Best Writing, Comedy	Zaiba Baig and Fab Filippo — "Sort Of I Love You"	Won	
Canadian Screen Awards	2023	Best Writing, Comedy	JP Larocque — "Sort Of Broke"	Nominated	
Peabody Award	2022	Entertainment	Sort Of	Won	
