= Suck It Up (film) =

2017 film directed by Jordan Canning

- Directed by: Jordan Canning
- Written by: Julia Hoff
- Produced by: Marc Tetreault; Jason Levangie; Carol Whiteman; Sandra Quinn
- Starring: Erin Carter; Grace Glowicki
- Cinematography: Guy Godfree
- Edited by: Simone Smith
- Music by: Ben Fox
- Release date: January 23, 2017 (Slamdance Film Festival)

Suck It Up is a 2017 Canadian drama film directed by Jordan Canning. It premiered in competition at the 2017 Slamdance Film Festival.

In December 2017, the film had its European premiere at the Frankfurt B3 Biennale, where it was awarded the Best Feature Film Award at the festival.

The film is about two best friends, both of whom have recently lost the same man - for Ronnie, her brother, for Faye, her first love.

Canning was nominated for the Directors Guild of Canada's DGC Discovery Award.

== Cast ==
- Erin Margurite Carter as Faye
- Grace Glowicki as Ronnie
- Dan Beirne as Granville
- Michael Rowe as Dale
- Toby Marks as Alex
