= Phoebe & Jay =

2026 animated children's television series

- Genre: Children's television series; Preschool; Educational
- Created by: Genie Deez; Thy Than
- Written by: Halcyon Person
- Directed by: Mike Alcock; Mark Sinclair
- Voices of: Cleo Annan; Isaiah Ball; Morrissa Nicole; Jonathan Langdon
- Theme music composer: Patrick Jarrett Jr.
- Composer: Patrick Jarrett Jr.
- Countries of origin: United States; Canada
- No. of seasons: 1
- No. of episodes: 13 (26 segments)

Production
- Executive producers: Genie Deez; Thy Than; Michael Hefferon; Tanya Green; Kim Dent Wilder; Wendy Moss Klein; Nancy Steinguard
- Production companies: Mainframe Studios; Phoebe & Jay Productions; Peter Hannan Productions (interstitials)

Original release
- Network: PBS Kids
- Release: February 2, 2026 – present

Phoebe & Jay is a children's animated television series created by Genie Deez and Thy Than. It was produced by Mainframe Studios, Peter Hannan Productions, and Phoebe & Jay Productions, animated by Philippine-based Top Draw Animation, and premiered on PBS Kids on February 2, 2026.

Major funding for Phoebe & Jay is provided by The Grable Foundation, a Ready-to-Learn grant from the U.S. Department of Education through the now-defunct Corporation for Public Broadcasting, and PBS viewers.

== Premise ==
Set in the fictional city of Nadatown, California (loosely based on the real-life city of Sacramento), Phoebe & Jay follows two titular African-American twin siblings who live at Tobsy Towers with their father, grandmother and cousin Craig.

== Characters ==
=== Main ===
- Phoebe Yarber (voiced by Cleo Annan) is an African-American girl who likes to sing. She is Jay's twin sister.
- Jay Yarber (voiced by Isaiah Ball) is an African-American boy. He is Phoebe's twin brother.
- Grandma Annie (voiced by Morrissa Nicole) is Phoebe and Jay's paternal grandmother.
- Pete Yarber (voiced by Jonathan Langdon) is Phoebe and Jay's father.

=== Supporting ===
- Yolo Armango (voiced by Pamela Estrada) is a Latina woman who lives in Apartment 4G.
- Lupe Armango (voiced by Avery DeWet) is a Latina girl who also lives in Apartment 4G.
- Mr. Gurley (voiced by Daniel Michael Karpenchuk) is an elderly Asian man who lives in Apartment 3C.
- Miss Jean (voiced by Linda Ballantyne) is a white woman who lives in Apartment 8C and owns a chartreuse bird named Houdini.
- Craig (voiced by Dwain Murphy) is a cousin of Phoebe & Jay who wears a red and white baseball cap worn backward.
- Manny (voiced by Haven Markus)
- Jaxxon (voiced by Mercedes Morris)
- Priya Dennis (voiced by Ana Sani) is a half-Desi neighbor.
- Miss Vee (voiced by Meghan Swavy)
- Sid (voiced by Dalmar Abuzzeid)
- Mr. Ellis (voiced by Tom Pickett)
- Mr. Marsden (voiced by Michael Daingerfield)
- Mr. Aguilar (voiced by Francisco Trujillo)
- London (voiced by Miranda Edwards) is Phoebe & Jay's aunt.
- Dayton (voiced by Tymika Tafari) is Phoebe & Jay's aunt.

== Episodes ==
| No. | Title | Written by | Original release date |
|---|---|---|---|
| 1 | "Paint on the Mail" | Halcyon Person | February 2, 2026 |
| 1 | "The Last Box" | Halcyon Person | February 2, 2026 |
"Paint on the Mail": While begging their grandmother to play with them in different roles, Phoebe and Jay accidentally run into each other and drop the items they were holding, causing light blue paint to spill on two packages and obfuscate parts of their respective mailing addresses. They, their father, and their grandmother use what information is still visible to figure out which apartment each package is supposed to be delivered to. "The Last Box": Whilst fighting over who should get to use a tablet first, Phoebe and Jay accidentally knock a tray off a box containing items from when their parents went to college. Phoebe wants to put on her deceased mother's jacket, but it stinks and, per the instructions on the tag, has to be hand-washed and left out in the sun to dry before she can put it on.
| 2 | "Bird Sitting" | Jehan Madhani | February 3, 2026 |
| 2 | "Jay's Fit" | Michael Olmo | February 3, 2026 |
"Bird Sitting": Miss Jean drops her bird Houdini off at Phoebe and Jay's apartment and gives them instructions on how to make it fall asleep. Phoebe memorizes the instructions by singing them.
| 3 | "Birthday Dance Surprise" | Aydrea Walden | February 4, 2026 |
| 3 | "The Green Pepper" | Jehan Madhani | February 4, 2026 |
| 4 | "Find Phoebe" | Aydrea Walden | February 5, 2026 |
| 4 | "Trick Shot" | Michael Olmo | February 5, 2026 |
"Find Phoebe": After Lupe says that she and Jay do not want to play "singy dance rope" (singing, dancing and playing jump rope simultaneously) with her, Phoebe runs away, and Jay and Lupe use wayfinding signs around Tobsy Towers to find her so Jay can apologize to her.
| 5 | "Fire Drill" | Kerry Crowley | February 6, 2026 |
| 5 | "Fruit Juice Frenzy" | Natalie Vazquez | February 6, 2026 |
| 6 | "Paper Rocketship" | Kerry Crowley | February 9, 2026 |
| 6 | "Fort Yarber" | Alyson Piekarsky | February 9, 2026 |
"Paper Rocketship": To remedy Pheobe and Jay of their rainy day blues, Mr. Gurley teaches them how to make paper airplanes and challenges them to break his record for longest paper airplane launch in Tobsy Towers.
| 7 | "Lost and Found" | Tiffany Thomas | February 10, 2026 |
| 7 | "Comic Tragedy" | Susan Kim | February 10, 2026 |
"Lost and Found": Phoebe and Jay make a list of things they have to do. Later, when they lose the walkie-talkie, they have to use a list to find it.
| 8 | "Queen B Butterfly" | Rukshan Thenuwara | February 11, 2026 |
| 8 | "Talent Show" | Ivory Floyd | February 11, 2026 |
| 9 | "Flipping Out" | Desmond Sargeant | February 12, 2026 |
| 9 | "Jay's Cut" | Genie Deez | February 12, 2026 |
| 10 | "Tobsy Speak" | Aydrea Walden | February 13, 2026 |
| 10 | "Perfect Potluck" | Renae J. Ruddock | February 13, 2026 |
"Tobsy Speak": Phoebe and Jay go through audio tapes that Tobsy (the namesake of Tobsy Towers) recorded when he was still alive, sorting them into boxes based on whether they contained music, or him speaking about his ideas for inventions.
| 11 | "I Know That's Right!" | Keion Jackson | July 1, 2026 |
| 11 | "Vote Vote Vote!" | Keion Jackson | July 1, 2026 |
| 12 | "The Recipe" | Joan Digba | July 2, 2026 |
| 12 | "The Campout" | Diane Kredensor | July 2, 2026 |
| 13 | "Beating the Heat" | Kerry Crowley | July 3, 2026 |
| 13 | "Tower Time" | Renae J. Ruddock | July 3, 2026 |
| 14 | "The Ten Minute Tidy" | N/A | November 30, 2026 |
| 14 | "Life in the Fast Lane" | N/A | November 30, 2026 |
| 15 | "Listen & Learn" | N/A | December 1, 2026 |
| 15 | "Yarber Family Tower" | N/A | December 1, 2026 |
| 16 | "The Right Sized Slice" | N/A | December 2, 2026 |
| 16 | "Recycling Heroes" | N/A | December 2, 2026 |

== Production ==
Phoebe & Jay was originally slated to premiere in Fall 2025, but its premiere was delayed to February 2, 2026, and its initial premiere spot was eventually taken by Weather Hunters.
