= Outsourcing of animation to the Philippines =

The Western animation industry (mainly that of the United States and Japan) has largely been outsourcing animated projects to the Philippines since the 1980s.

== History ==
=== Origins ===
The animation industry in the Philippines traces its origins back to the 1980s, during and after the Marcos regime. Being one of the earlier players in the industry, with the local Philippine animation industry scene being around for already twenty years, the Philippines is considered one of the stronger Asian players in the realm of animation globally. The rising need for outsourced services, mainly from the United States and Europe, caused the continued flourishing of animation studios in the country. These animation studios were for the most part export-driven and catered mostly to the demands of these foreign animators. Among the first few animation studios in the country include Burbank Animation Inc., Asian Animation, and Fil-Cartoons. The clientele of Philippine studios supply the demand coming from the United States and Europe. Today, the country is regarded as one of the main and "stronger players" in outsourced and global animated cartoon production. The Philippines is second to India in providing services related to business outsourcing.

=== Progress and development ===
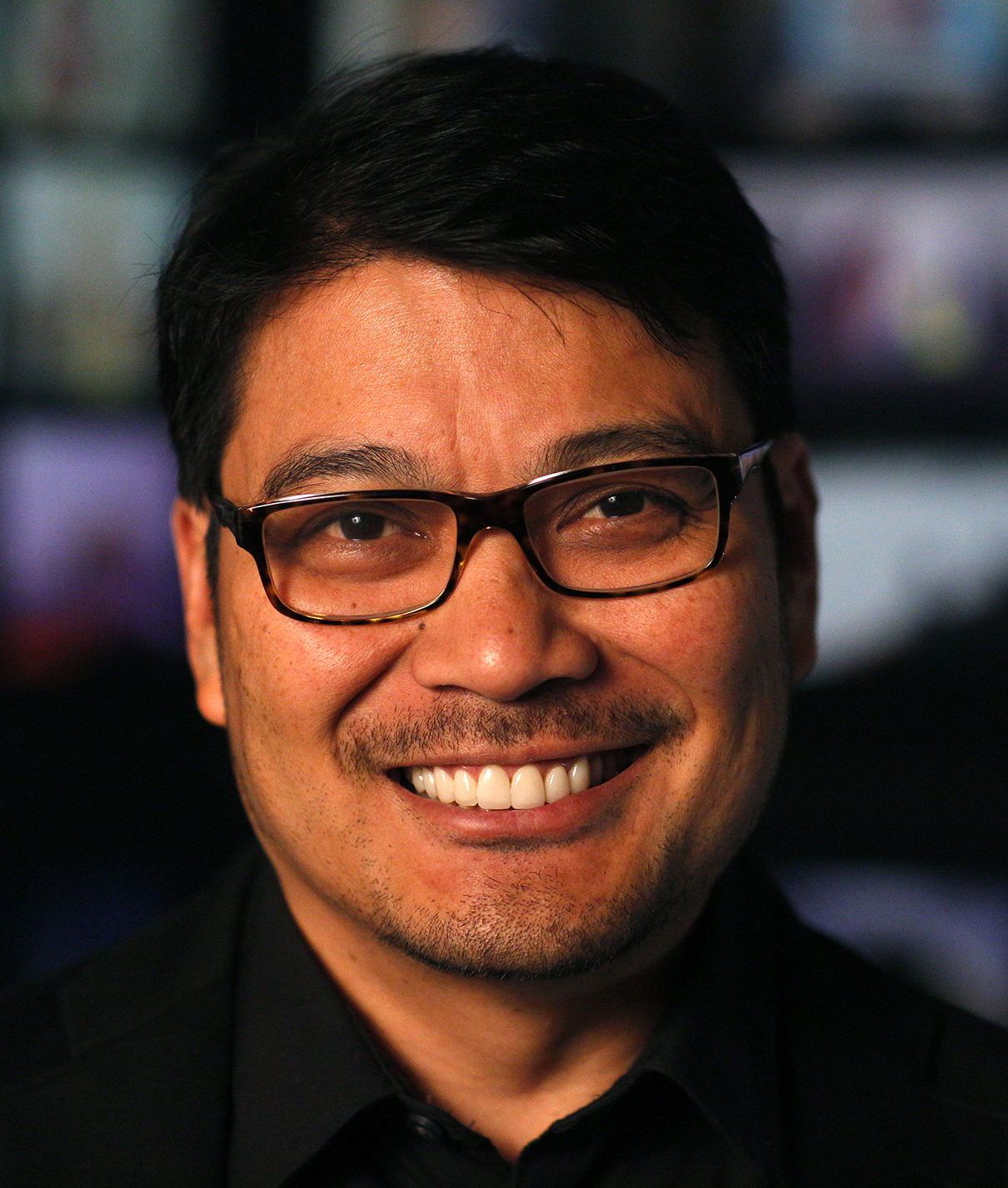
del Carmen, circa. 2014

In 1983, Burbank Animation Inc., an Australian company, established a branch in the Philippines. AsianAnimation, originally called Optifex International, Inc., was one of the first Filipino-owned corporations. In 1988, another large company known as Fil-Cartoons was established.

In previous projects of DreamWorks Animation in Los Angeles, the Filipino-American animator Ronnie Del Carmen was chosen as the artistic supervisor for works such as The Prince of Egypt (1998) and The Road to El Dorado.

Primetime Emmy-winner Jess Española started working with Fil-Cartoons, a subsidiary of Hanna-Barbera in Pasig where he served as lead animator and supervisor in 1985. He spend much time of animation for several animated shows, particularly The New Yogi Bear Show and The Smurfs. His exceptional talent was immediately noticed by the company, giving him the opportunity to work with Hanna-Barbera in Los Angeles, CA. After he left Hanna-Barbera in the late 1990s due to layoffs, he joined Film Roman to work as a layout artist and assistant director for adult-aimed shows King of the Hill and Futurama, and later The Simpsons after he met the show's creator Matt Groening.

Other major studios in the country have emerged including Toei Animation, a Japanese company with a Philippine subsidiary that has worked on G.I. Joe, Transformers, Dragon Ball, Sailor Moon and Nadja; Top Peg Animation and Creative Studio, Inc. which is a Philippine-owned company which has worked on Disney television series including 101 Dalmatians: The Series, The Legend of Tarzan, Kim Possible, and Hercules (1998). In 2009, Toei Animation and Top Draw were part of the 2010–11 Philippines Top 15,000 Corporations as well as four members of the Association Council of the Philippines.

== Trend ==
According to the 1994 Census of Establishments, there is a total of 4609 film and animation establishments in the country, with a combined gross revenue of PHP 1.796 billion. A significant number of these firms are located in Metro Manila, the national capital region of the Philippines, amounting to about 34.43% of the total film and animation firms in the country.

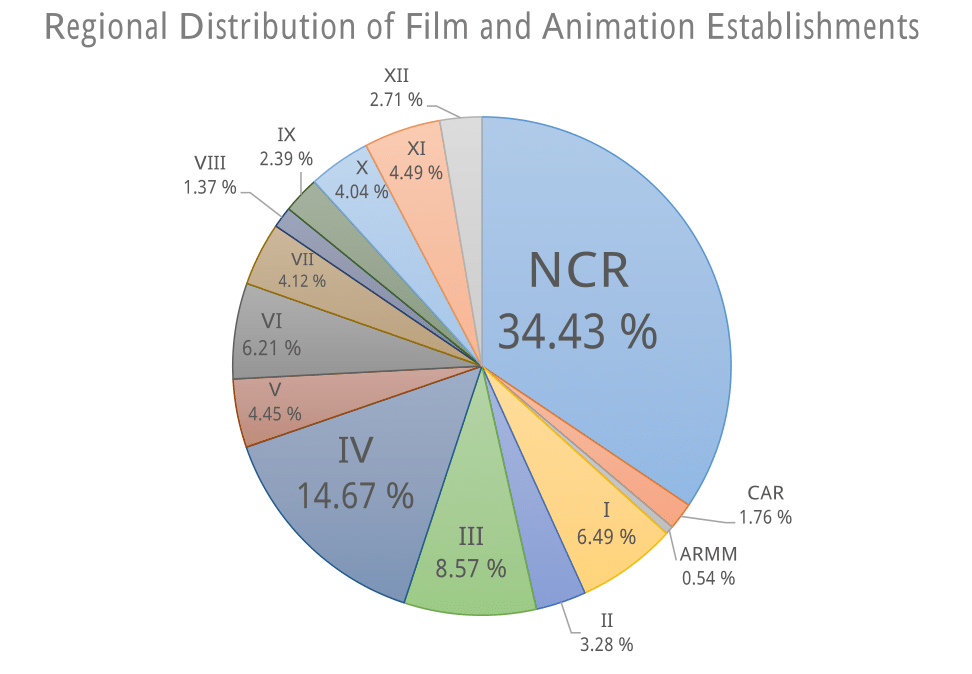
Regional distribution of film and animation establishments in the country according to the 1994 Census of Establishments

The employment rate in the Philippine animation sector experienced continued rates of increase from 2004 to 2008, with an annual average rate of increase of 29.10% per year from 3000 workers in 2004 to 8000 workers in 2008. The highest employment growth rate occurred in 2005, increasing the workforce by 50%. However, a sudden drop in total industry employment growth rate was observed in 2007, from 44.4% in 2006 to 7.7% in 2007.

Due to having a low-skill labor force, the Philippines largely relies on the traditional cel-animated production. Only countries such as the US and Japan are able to distribute CGI animation to the global market mainly because of the high cost of post-production and distribution of producing CGI.

According to the Animation Council of the Philippines, the number of animation firms in the country has been steadily increasing, with the number of locally owned animation firms increasing at a higher rate than that of foreign-owned animation firms from 1980 to 2011. From 3,000 in 2004, the estimated number of employed artists in the industry has jumped to 10,000 as of 2010. In order to provide students with the proper training for potential careers in the field of animation, government agencies such as the Commission on Higher Education (CHED), Department of Education (DepEd), and the Technical Education and Skills Development Authority (TESDA) have taken actions in creating “regulatory standards for academic requirements associated with two-year animation courses” and “training regulations, courseware, and assessment” for schools offering animation courses.

Though both have long been considered competitors in the global information technology industry, India is admittedly way ahead of the Philippines in terms of size and manpower. Instead of competing against each other, Aninash Gupta, minister of the Embassy of India, encourages “coopetition”, which means cooperation among competitors. By complementing their strengths, both Philippine and Indian animation companies could enter joint ventures to be able to be at par with other Asian countries, like Singapore and Hong Kong, and garner larger parts of the market including the US. In a press conference, Mr. Gupta and Filipino economist Bernardo Villegas urged for the formation of partnerships and business opportunities that the Philippines and India could explore.

== Known companies ==
=== Toon City Animation ===
Toon City Animation began as a traditional animation studio that rendered services for Walt Disney Television Animation. It has since grown into becoming the preferred subcontracting animation facility in Asia. The studio is the animation production house for major clients such as Walt Disney Television Animation, Universal Animation Studios, Warner Bros. Animation, and Europe-based MoonScoop Productions.

Currently, Toon City belongs to an exclusive list of studios, as it has been recognized with the Emmy award of Outstanding Animated Children's Program in 2010, for "Curious George." The studio offers services such as pre-production, storyboarding, Digital 2D, Traditional/Tradigital Animation, Flash, and After Effects.

=== Toei Animation Philippines Inc. ===
Toei Animation Philippines Inc. is subsidiary of Toei Animation Co., Ltd. in Japan. It began in 1986 via a Memorandum of Agreement between Toei Animation Co. Ltd and EEI Corp. The studio boasts a total of 200 employees, and has a production capacity of about 60,000 drawings per month.

The company began the digitization of its animation process in the year of 1997. It started with Digital Ink and Paint and Special Effects production. In the year of 2000, it became the first Philippine animation studio to fully digitize its In-betweening process. On July 1, 2006, the studio started its 3D Computer Graphics production, which also serve the requirements of Toei Animation Co., Ltd.

=== Philippine Animation Studio Inc. ===
Philippine Animation Studio Inc. Philippine Animators Group Inc.
- Type: Animation studio
- Founded: 1990
- Defunct: 2020
- Headquarters: 5th Floor, G. A. Yupangco Building, 339 Sen. Gil Puyat Avenue, Corner Nicanor Garcia Street, Makati City, Philippines
- Owner: Astro All Asia Network plc
- Website: pasi.com.ph (archived 2019-05-19)

Philippine Animation Studio Inc. (PASI), sometimes credited as Philippine Animators Group Inc. (PAGI) was an animation studio established in 1990. It has worked with at least 700 half-hour shows in its library and has worked with several clients such as Canadian companies Nelvana Limited and Breakthrough Entertainment, along KKC&D, and Warner Bros. Animation. PASI is known for being a producer of traditional 2D animation and Adobe Flash Professional. It is one of the oldest known studios to have specialized in the latter. PASI's last credit was in 2020 and its website shut down the same year. The Flash website shutdown in around 2021.

==== External links ====
- List of PASI's programs

=== ASI Studios ===
ASI Studios is a Manila-based studio and provides full animation services. The studio is known for having animated the popular reboot television series "George of the Jungle," among other renowned TV series. The studio was brought forth from a collaboration between Manila-based Synergy88 and Singapore's August Media Holdings. It is situated in Quezon City, Metro Manila.

The studio boasts 130 specialized artists and technicians accompanied by experience in 2D, Traditional Cut Out, and Paperless Animation. ASI works primarily on long format 2D animation. A majority of the studio's projects involve work scopes that concern scene layouts, composited animations, storyboards, and designs.

=== Top Draw Animation ===
Top Draw Animation is a Manila-based studio established in 1999 by Wayne Dearing. They provide a full range of pre-production and production services. Their pre-production services include story boards, location design, model and prop design, background color and color styling. For production, they specialize in hand drawn animation and Toon Boom Harmony.

Some of their works include My Little Pony: Friendship Is Magic, The Tom and Jerry Show, The Skinner Boys: Guardians of the Lost Secrets, Wild Grinders, The Loud House Movie, Rise of the Teenage Mutant Ninja Turtles: The Movie, Phoebe and Jay, and Looped.

The company has worked with several clients such as WildBrain (Vancouver), SLR Productions and Brain Power Studio.

=== World Anime Networks ===
World Anime Networks, Inc. (WAN) is a Japanese animation studio founded by Ryouji Kawaguchi. WAN Philippine branch was established in Baguio City on October 26, 2017, and, though working on titles with other companies, is mostly doing work for the Japanese animation studio Feel.

== Services ==
The Philippines Department of Trade and Industry has ranked animation among the five priority industries for promotion under the IT-service sector roadmap. The DTI led a five-company delegation to the 2002 International Animated Film Market in Annecy, France, the world's largest show, and promoted Philippine animation companies in the 19th International Film and Program Market for TV, Video, Cable and Satellite in Cannes, France. In February 2003, animation companies attended the local “e-Services Philippines: IT Outsourcing Conference and Exhibition”. On this occasion DTI and the Animation Council of the Philippines also launched an annual amateur competition – Animazing Shorts – with assistance from Intel Philippines and the local distributor of the Maya animation Software.

Foreign ownership or leadership is considerable, and has provided Philippines-based studios with the contacts, credibility (to foreign buyers, including both production studios and TV chains), finance, and production and creative expertise. The major studios include:

- Toei Animation is the Japanese company that has decided to entrust 60 percent of its total animation work to its Philippine subsidiary.
- Top Peg Animation and Creative Studio Inc., a 100-percent Philippine-owned company
- Top Draw, which is a recent entrant that is highly regarded and which does international work.
- Philippines Animation Studios (PASI), which is funded by a listed Malaysian company, and which has a strong core team of animators.
- Holy Cow! Animation, a studio specializing in 3D (three-dimensional) digital animation.

Along with these, there are numerous other smaller companies.

In recent years, some of the major studios that had been captive to or owned by larger foreign studios have now branched out to seek work on their own worldwide through their networks.

== Controversy ==
Controversies arose regarding the majority of Filipino animation studios who continue to outsource their talents to foreign film makers for non-Filipino audiences due to financial issues. Some Filipino studios and their talents have also been abused by major animation studios, primarily Sony Pictures Animation and Pixar Animation Studios.

== See also ==
- Filipino animation
- Cartoon Network (Philippines)
