= Jordan Canning =

Canadian film and television director

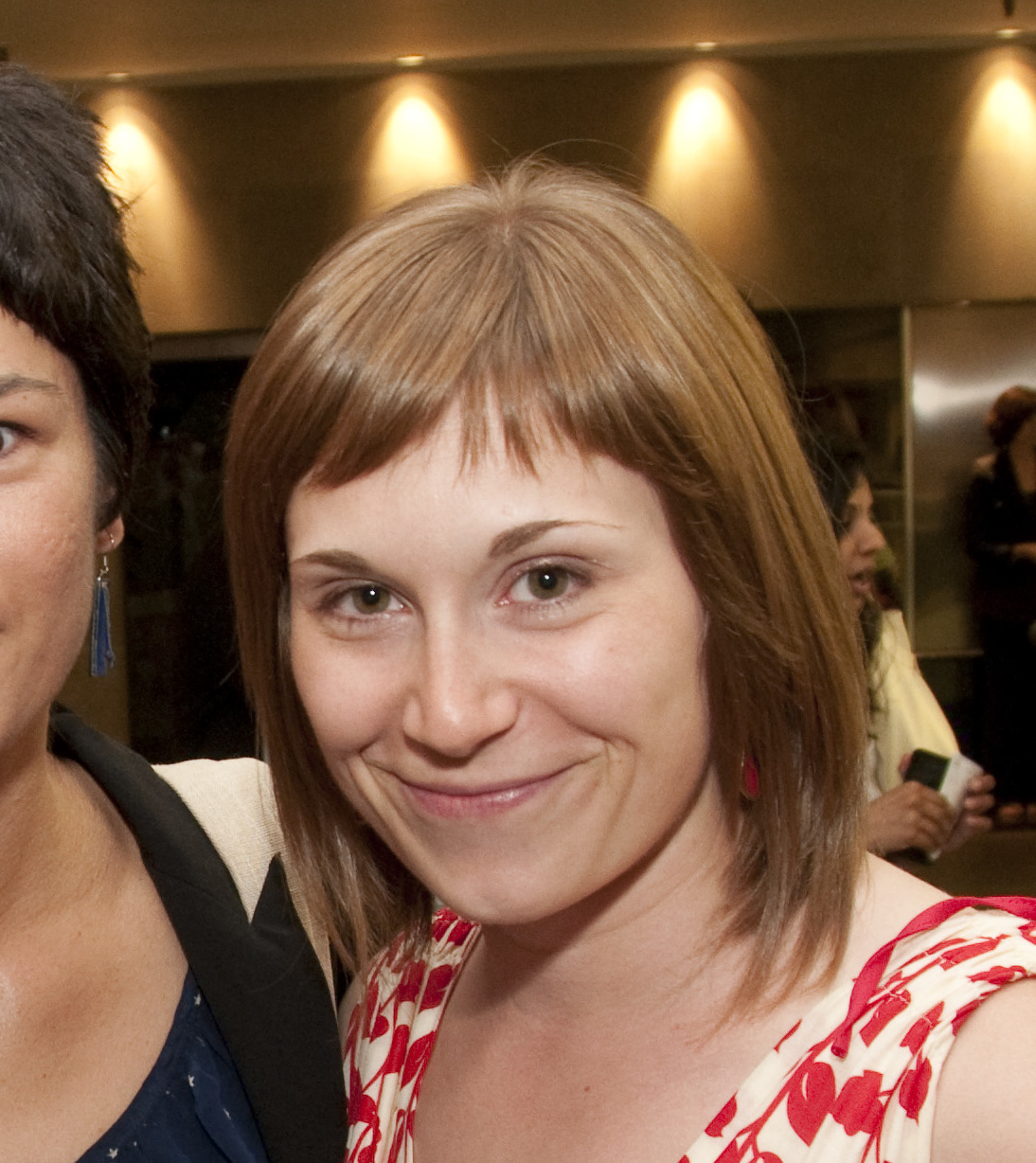
- Born: St. John's, Newfoundland and Labrador, Canada
- Occupation: Film director
- Years active: 2005 - Present

Jordan Canning is a Canadian director for film and television. She is known for her independent feature films We Were Wolves (2014) and Suck It Up (2017), as well as her work directing on television series Baroness Von Sketch Show, Burden of Truth and Schitt's Creek.

== Early life ==
She was born in St. John's, Newfoundland and Labrador. She attended Concordia University in Montreal.

== Career ==
Canning's films have won a number of awards, including two Golden Sheaf Awards, three awards at the NSI Online Short Film Festival, and top prize at the 2012 Toronto International Film Festival RBC Emerging Filmmaker Competition. She directed all twenty-three episodes of the IPF-supported web series Space Riders: Division Earth for CTV. The show won the 2014 Canadian Screen Award for Best Digital Series and four Canadian Comedy Awards, including Best Director.

Canning's 2014 feature film We Were Wolves made its world premiere at the Toronto International Film Festival and is distributed by Unobstructed View. We Were Wolves stars Peter Mooney and Steve Cochrane. Canning's debut feature was also awarded the Best Feature Prize from the Atlantic Film Festival.

In 2015, Canning was awarded the Women In the Director's Chair Feature Film Award for her second feature film, Suck It Up (2017), which premiered at the 2017 Slamdance Film Festival and is distributed by Level Film. Suck it Up stars Grace Glowicki and Erin Carter, and won Best Feature Film at the 2017 B3 Frankfurt Biennale, and Canning was nominated for the Directors Guild of Canada's DGC Discovery Award.

In 2016, Canning made a foray into television, directing on Saving Hope and This Hour Has 22 Minutes, where she became the first female director on the show. The following year, she directed episodes of the series The Detail (CTV), Burden of Truth (CBC/The CW), and Baroness Von Sketch Show (CBC/IFC). In 2018, she directed on Schitt's Creek, Little Dog (CBC) and season four of Baroness Von Sketch Show.

Canning was nominated for two 2020 Canadian Screen Awards: one for Best Direction, Comedy (Schitt's Creek, "Meet The Parents") and one for Best Direction, Variety or Sketch Comedy (Baroness Von Sketch Show, "Humanity is in An Awkward Stage" - with co-director Aleysa Young).

In 2023, Canning was recognized for her direction of the Star Trek: Strange New Worlds episode "Charades", which was listed as one of the ten Best TV Episodes of 2023 by Rolling Stone. Canning's directorial work on "Charades" also garnered her recognition from Indiewire, which ranked the episode #22 on their list of the 25 best TV episodes of 2023, and Vanity Fair, which also listed the episode as one of the best of 2023.

Canning also directed a number of music videos, including:

- "Death is Quick" by Hey Rosetta!
- "There's an Arc" by Hey Rosetta
- "Best Served" by Pathological Lovers
- "All Hands" by Tim Baker
- "Dance" by Tim Baker

She is a 2010 graduate of the Director's Lab at the Canadian Film Centre and an alumnus of TIFF Pitch This! and Talent Lab.

It was announced that filming would begin in early 2026 for Oddly Flowers, a film based on the novel Come, Thou Tortoise by Jessica Grant, which would be written, directed, and produced by Canning.

== Filmography ==
=== Film ===
Year	Title	Role	Genre	Notes
2005	Pillowtalk	Writer, director	Short Film	
2006	Thick & Thin	Writer, director	Short Film	
2007	Here On In	Writer, director	Short Film	
2008	The House Series - Bedroom, Kitchen, Bathroom	Director	Short Film Trilogy	
2009	Countdown	Writer, director	Short Film	National Screen Institute Drama Prize
2010	Best Served	Director	Short Film	
2010	Not Over Easy	Director, Co-Writer	Short Animation	NSI Short Film Festival Awards
2011	Oliver Bump's Birthday	Director	Short Film	Canadian Film Centre Short Dramatic Film; Yorkton Film Festival Golden Sheaf Award - Short Subject
2012	Seconds	Writer, director	Short Film	TIFF RBC Emerging Filmmakers Award
2012	The Tunnel	Director	Short Film	
2014	We Were Wolves	Director, Co-Writer	Feature Film	2014 Toronto International Film Festival
2015	Space Riders: Division Earth	Director	Web Series	Canadian Screen Award - Best Digital Series
2017	Suck It Up	Director	Feature Film	WIDC Feature Film Award
2017	Ordinary Days	Co-Director	Feature Film	Canadian Film Festival - Best Director
2020	4 North A	Co-director, writer	Animated short	

=== Television ===
Years	Title	Role	Notes
2016–17	This Hour Has 22 Minutes	Director	Season 24; four episodes
2017	Saving Hope	Director	Season 5; one episode
2018	Burden of Truth	Director	Season 1; two episodes
2018	The Detail	Director	Season 1; two episodes
2018–21	Baroness Von Sketch Show	Director	Season 3; five episodes, Season 4; five episodes
2019–20	Schitt's Creek	Director	Season 5; seven episodes
2019	Little Dog	Director	Season 2; two episodes
2020–21	Nurses	Director	Season 1; one episode, Season 2; one episode
2021–24	Family Law	Director	Season 1; two episodes, Season 3; two episodes
2022–24	Fraggle Rock: Back to the Rock	Director	Season 1; three episodes, Season 2; five episodes
2022	Astrid & Lilly Save the World	Director	Two episodes
2023–26	Star Trek: Strange New Worlds	Director	Season 2; one episode, Season 3; two episodes Season 4; one episode
2024	Brilliant Minds	Director	Season 1; one episode
2026	Law & Order Toronto: Criminal Intent	Director	Season 3; two episode
