= Vollies (TV series) =

Canadian television comedy series

Vollies is a Canadian television comedy series, which premiered in 2021 on Bell Fibe's TV1. The series centres on the Essex-West-Essex Fire Department, a smalltown volunteer fire department with too much time on their hands because their town never has any actual fires to fight.

The series stars Jonathan Torrens, Sarah McCarthy, Alicia McCarvell, Edwina Govindsamy, Mary Austin, Brian George and James Faulkner. It was created by Torrens and McCarthy, and written by Torrens, McCarthy, Sylvia Beirnes and Mark Forward. It was shot in and around the Truro, Nova Scotia, area in spring 2021.

In October 2021, Vollies was renewed for a second season, which began filming in the spring of 2022.

Torrens received a Canadian Screen Award nomination for Best Supporting Actor in a Comedy Series at the 10th Canadian Screen Awards in 2022.

== Episodes ==
Story	Title	Directed by	Written by	Original release date
1	"BARFOCOPTER"	Jonathan Torrens	Jonathan Torrens, Sarah D. McCarthy, Mark Forward, Sylvia Beirnes	20 October 2021
2	"A Night to Re-ember"	Jonathan Torrens	Jonathan Torrens, Sarah D. McCarthy, Mark Forward, Sylvia Beirnes	20 October 2021
3	"The Roof is on What?"	Jonathan Torrens	Jonathan Torrens, Sarah D. McCarthy, Mark Forward, Sylvia Beirnes	20 October 2021
4	"DeLong Game"	Jonathan Torrens	Jonathan Torrens, Sarah D. McCarthy, Mark Forward, Sylvia Beirnes	20 October 2021
5	"The Gas Leak"	Jonathan Torrens	Jonathan Torrens, Sarah D. McCarthy, Mark Forward, Sylvia Beirnes	20 October 2021
6	"The Eternal Flame"	Jonathan Torrens	Jonathan Torrens, Sarah D. McCarthy, Mark Forward, Sylvia Beirnes	20 October 2021
