= Rakhee Morzaria =

Canadian actress

Rakhee Morzaria is a Canadian comedian, actor, and writer. Morzaria is most noted for her starring role as Camille Pham in the television sitcom Run the Burbs, for which she has also been a writer. She received two Canadian Screen Award nominations for Best Leading Performance in a Comedy Series for her work on Run the Burbs, at the 11th Canadian Screen Awards in 2023 and at the 13th Canadian Screen Awards in 2025.

== Career ==
Morzaria started in improv comedy at The Second City in Toronto and was awarded the highly competitive Bob Curry Fellowship Program.

She has also had supporting or guest roles in film and television, and has acted on stage in improv comedy shows including Only Human and Past Dark. Kelly Bedard stated, "The standout performers are the incredibly versatile Rakhee Morzaria (her diatribe about dieting secrets is sheer brilliance)".

Morzaria was the creator and star of the web series Rakhee Morzaria's Note to Self, which was a Canadian Screen Award nominee for Best Original Digital Program or Series, Fiction at the 6th Canadian Screen Awards in 2018. She also received two Canadian Comedy Award nominations, for Best Performance in a Web Series and Best Writing in a Web Series, at the 19th Canadian Comedy Awards in 2019.

Morzaria was a juror for the HollyShorts Film Festival 20th Anniversary Jury and in 2022 Morzaria was the host of the Banff World Media Festival (BANFF), presenting the Rockie Awards International Program Competition.

Morzaria stars as lead Camille Pham on Run the Burbs on CBC. Radheyan Simonpillai of The Globe and Mail stated "Morzaria (who also writes on the series) is a hilarious force of nature.”

== Awards ==
Morzaria received the 2023 MISAFF Star presented by ACTRA at the 10th annual Mosaic International South Asian Film Festival in Mississauga, Ontario.

== Filmography ==
=== Film ===
| Year | Title | Role | Notes |
|---|---|---|---|
| 2020 | My Spy | Tina | |
| 2022 | Wedding Season | Rupa | |
| 2025 | Dinner with Friends | Evie | |

=== Television ===
| Year | Title | Role | Notes |
|---|---|---|---|
| 2017 | The Beaverton Digital | Mariam | Episode: "Beaverton Russian Times" |
| 2017–2018 | Note to Self | Rakhee | 13 episodes |
| 2018 | The Beaverton | Val Correia | Episode #2.12 |
| 2018 | Taken | Cable News Reporter | Episode: "Password" |
| 2018 | Soul Decision | Jess | Episode: "The Actors" |
| 2018 | #Interns | Intern 3 | 6 episodes |
| 2019 | Pete Samcras | Woman 1 / Mom | 2 episodes |
| 2019 | How to Buy a Baby | Natasha | Episode #2.6 |
| 2019–2020 | Running with Violet | Anna | 6 episodes |
| 2020 | What We Do in the Shadows | Karen | Episode: "Collaboration" |
| 2021 | TallBoyz | Another Woman | Episode: "All the Focus Is on the Diamonds" |
| 2021 | The Parker Andersons | Sheila | Episode: "This Wasn't the Plan" |
| 2021 | Private Eyes | Meera Love | Episode: "Dead Air" |
| 2021 | Hudson & Rex | MIrai Sidhu | Episode: "Leader of the Pack" |
| 2021 | Canadian Reflections | Amira | Episode: "P!GS" |
| 2022–2024 | Run the Burbs | Camille Pham | 38 episodes; also story editor |
| 2022–present | Summer Memories | Tall Girl (voice) | 14 episodes |
| 2023 | Shelved | News Anchor | Episode: "Brave New World SF HUX" |
