= Julie Nolke =

Canadian comedian, actress, and writer

Julie Marie Nolke
- Born: 1989 or 1990 (age 35–36); Calgary, Alberta, Canada
- Education: York University (BFA in Acting)
- Occupations: Actress; comedian; YouTuber; writer
- Years active: 2014–present
- Known for: Explaining The Pandemic to my Past Self; Tastemade videos and show
- Spouse: Samuel Larson
- Children: 1

YouTube information
- Channel: JulieNolke
- Genres: Skits; parodies; vlogs
- Subscribers: 1.08 million
- Views: 211.9 million
- Last updated: 16 August 2026

Julie Marie Nolke is a Canadian comedian, actress, writer, and YouTuber. She is best known for her comedic YouTube series Explaining the Pandemic to my Past Self.

== Career ==
Nolke initially started her YouTube channel Feeling Peckish in May 2015 as a hobby with her boyfriend Sam where she uploaded cooking videos. She was then hired by Tastemade to make videos, develop ideas for content, and to produce branded content. She has also starred in the Tastemade show One for the Road with Andrew Gunadie. She later changed her YouTube channel name to Julie Nolke, where she now uploads skits, parodies and vlogs.

According to Nolke, the inspiration for her channel is: "I want to debunk this idea that women aren't funny. I think you can not only be a funny woman, but you can talk about things from a woman's perspective and have it be funny. That's the main mantra of the channel." Her YouTube video Are We Bad Feminists? won the "Excellence in Writing" award at the 2019 Buffer Festival. She also directed, wrote, and starred in a YouTube video When you buy ADULT TOYS online, which was nominated for the 2020 Outstanding Comedy Short at the Toronto Sketchfest "Best of the Fest" award show.

In April 2020, Nolke uploaded the first episode of Explaining the Pandemic to My Past Self to YouTube, a comedy sketch depicting her time-traveling to talk to her past self before the COVID-19 pandemic where she vaguely discusses various social and political issues that have arisen in the future with her past self, such as the pandemic, the George Floyd protests, and the 2020 Beirut explosion. The first several videos in the series collectively had more than 25 million views by October 2020. By January 2022, she had uploaded seven videos in the series. Explaining the Pandemic to My Past Self was nominated for a 2021 Webby Award in the Viral, General Video category. Nolke won 2021 Webby Awards in Best Individual Performance and two Audience Choice Awards for best viral video and best writing.

In addition to her YouTube channel, she has had roles in movies, short films, and television shows, including Oil Men, What We Do in the Shadows, TallBoyz, Workin' Moms, and Run the Burbs. She starred in the comedy short Hashtag Apocalypse, which received an award of distinction at the 2019 Canada Shorts Film Festival. Nolke had a small role in Secret Society of Second-Born Royals, but has said her part was cut in the final version.

In September 2022, she founded YouTube comedy group Pulp Comedy which features six Canadian comedy actors and writers.

She won Creator of the Year at the 14th Canadian Screen Awards.

== Personal life ==
Nolke was born in Calgary, Alberta. Her husband, Samuel Larson, directs her YouTube videos. They have one child together.

== Filmography ==
Julie Nolke filmography
Year	Title	Role	Notes	Ref
2014	Exquisite	Destiny		
2017	Oil Men	Leanne Romanko		
2019	TallBoyz	Stephanie		
2019	Hashtag Apocalypse	Elliot		
2020	What We Do in the Shadows	Witch No. 1		
2020	Workin' Moms	Bank Manager		
2022–2024	Run the Burbs	Sam		
2022	Coroner	Cori	Episode: "Safe Space"	
2023	You're My Hero	Peyton		
2023	The Wedding Rule	Gemma (lead)		
2024	Please, After You	Elsa		
2025	A Firefighter's Christmas Calendar	Valerie Petrillo	Television film	
