= Jonathan Torrens =

Canadian actor and television personality

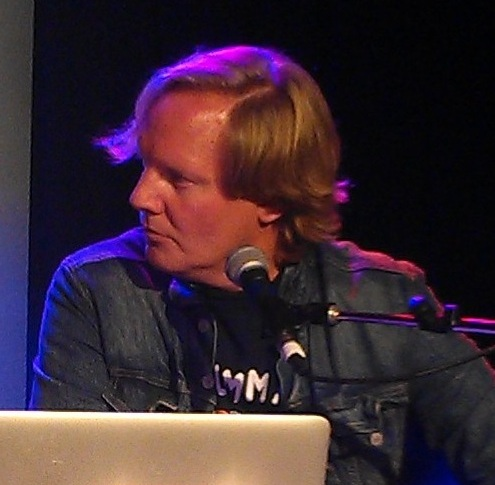
- Torrens in 2017
- Born: October 2, 1972 (age 54); Charlottetown, Prince Edward Island, Canada
- Other names: Jono, J-Roc
- Occupations: Actor, television personality
- Years active: 1989–present
- Children: 2
- Website: TAGGART And TORRENS Podcast

Jonathan Ormond Torrens (born October 2, 1972) is a Canadian actor and television personality best known for his co-hosting of Street Cents, his talk show Jonovision, and his role as "J-Roc" in the popular Canadian mockumentary Trailer Park Boys. In October 2009, Torrens began hosting TV with TV's Jonathan Torrens, a comedic newsmagazine program broadcast on the TVtropolis network. In January 2014, he teamed up with fellow Canadian Jeremy Taggart to create the Taggart and Torrens Podcast. They discuss everything from sports to politics and offer a unique perspective on current issues.

== Early life ==
Torrens was born in Charlottetown, Prince Edward Island. As a child, he lived in Sherwood where he attended Sherwood Elementary School. He made his first stage appearance there in Grade 1. In 1983, after first attending Colonel Gray High School in Charlottetown, Prince Edward Island, he moved to Halifax with his family, where he attended St. Patrick's High School. His sister is actress and playwright Jackie Torrens.

== Career ==
Torrens's past work includes co-hosting CBC Television's teen-oriented consumer affairs series Street Cents from 1989 until 1996. He then went on to host, co-produce and write for his own teen-oriented talk show, Jonovision, from 1996 until 2001.

In 1998, he played David in Beefcake, a movie about 1950s muscle magazines and their connection with the gay community. The same year, he won a Gemini in the category of Best Short Dramatic Program for his work on Nan's Taxi. In 1999, he hosted and narrated a 33-minute docudrama on the consequences of impaired driving for the Alberta Alcohol and Drug Abuse Commission (AADAC) called When Choices Collide. In 2001 he played Tony Moressa on the show Pit Pony and had two appearances on Royal Canadian Air Farce as 'The Clean Cut Keen SportsNet Guy'. From there he went on to Rideau Hall in 2002 and had a guest appearance on This Hour Has 22 Minutes. In 2003, he starred in the CBC six episode mini-series Jonathan Crosses Canada, in which he traveled across Canada in a Winnebago.

During the summer of 2004, he starred as "The Gotta-be-Gay-Guy" on the Spike TV mock reality show, Joe Schmo 2, and has made appearances on the shows The Greatest Canadian and 50 Most Outrageous TV Moments.

In 2003, Torrens played the role of Shane McKay, Emma Nelson's biological father, in a two-part episode of Degrassi: The Next Generation, a revival of the teen drama Degrassi Junior High, as original actor Bill Parrott declined to reprise the role. Torrens had previously reunited the original Degrassi cast in 1999 on Jonovision, which became the show's highest rated episode and is regarded as a catalyst for Degrassi's revival.

Torrens has a recurring role as J-Roc on the television series Trailer Park Boys. He recalled: "Mike [Clattenburg] called me and said, 'We're doing six episodes of a show called Trailer Park Boys.' I'd seen the short, and knew the guys. He said, 'You should play J-Roc.' Mike and I got along so well creatively and really made each other laugh. That, and getting to spend time on something different was very appealing." He also appeared in all of the Trailer Park Boys movies. In November and December 2008, Jonathan was the guest host of several episodes of the CBC radio show Definitely Not the Opera.

In 2008, he appeared in the award-winning short film Treevenge, directed by Jason Eisener.

In 2009, Torrens debuted in his own television show called TV With TV's Jonathan Torrens on Canadian specialty network TVtropolis and ended in 2011. As of 2010, Torrens is one of the co-hosts of the reality television series Wipeout Canada, which also airs on TVtropolis that ended after 13 episodes.

On March 21, 2013, it was confirmed on Facebook that Torrens had gained forty pounds to reprise his role as J-Roc in the third Trailer Park Boys film, Don't Legalize It. Torrens appeared in Season 8 of Trailer Park Boys, which debuted on Netflix on September 5, 2014. He also was a co-writer for Seasons 9 and 10 of Trailer Park Boys. Torrens left the cast of Trailer Park Boys in April 2016.

He has also had regular roles in the television series Mr. D, Call Me Fitz, Game On, and Letterkenny.

In October 2017, Jeremy Taggart and Torrens released the paperback book Canadianity: Tales From The true North Strong And Freezing, "a collection of showbiz tales from the road and relatable everyday anecdotes, all wrapped up in a nostalgic fondness for this great country. Canadianity takes readers on a cross-country journey, shining the spotlight on notable local heroes (or bands), the best places to crush food and the greasiest watering holes, coast to coast to coast."

In 2019, Torrens launched the financial education web series Your Two Cents.

In 2021, Torrens wrote, directed and starred in Vollies, a sitcom about volunteer firefighters for Bell Aliant's Bell Fibe on-demand service. The series debuted on October 20, 2021. He received a Canadian Screen Award nomination for Best Supporting Actor in a Comedy Series at the 10th Canadian Screen Awards in 2022.

In 2022, he began a recurring role on the show Shoresy as Remy Nadeau and appeared as the father of the main characters in the movie Kids vs. Aliens.

In 2026 he appeared as Steve in the comedy film The Snake.

== Personal life ==
Torrens is married and has two daughters.
