= Joyce Wong (director) =

Canadian director, screenwriter (active 2006– )

- Occupations: Film director, screenwriter
- Known for: Wexford Plaza

Joyce Wong is a Canadian film director and screenwriter from Toronto, Ontario, known for her work in film and television. She is most noted for her debut feature film Wexford Plaza, which was a shortlisted finalist for the John Dunning Discovery Award at the 6th Canadian Screen Awards, and for the Rogers Best Canadian Film Award from the Toronto Film Critics Association.

== Career ==
Her first narrative feature film, Wexford Plaza (2016), was a coming-of-age "halfalogue" shown from two different perspectives. The director describes the film as a "love letter to Scarborough, where I grew up," and The Playlist called it a "darkly funny and unabashedly raw look at what it means to grow up." In addition to its Canadian Screen Award, Wexford Plaza won the 2017 "Best Narrative Feature Award" at the San Diego Asian Film Festival, and the 2017 "Comcast Best Narrative Feature Award" by the Centre for Asian American Media in San Francisco.

Her 2011 documentary Power of Love (Celine Dion Fans in Kenya), about Kenyan Maasai fans of Celine Dion, was screened at the Hot Docs Film Festival, CFC Worldwide Short Film Festival, Vancouver International Film Festival, Guadalajara International Film Festival, and Hawaii International Film Festival.

Her comedy short Banana Bruises (2006) won "Best Fiction Short" at the Cinesiege Film Festival.

She has also directed several episodes of Workin' Moms, Baroness von Sketch Show, Fakes, and The Sticky.

== See also ==
- List of female film and television directors
