= Jerry Franklin (CEO) =

President and CEO of CPBI Jerry Franklin
- Incumbent
- Assumed office 1985

Jerry Franklin was the president and chief executive officer (CEO) of Connecticut Public Broadcasting, which includes CPTV and WNPR in Hartford, Connecticut. He was with the company for 33 years until his retirement in 2019.

== Early life ==
Jerry Franklin was born to Jasper Remer Franklin Sr., a veteran of the United States Army, and Myrtis H. Franklin of Candler County, Georgia. Franklin married Ida Durden-Franklin of Metter, Georgia.

== Education ==
Jerry Franklin received a B.S. in political science and journalism from Georgia Southern University and a Master of Arts in telecommunications management from Indiana University.

== Career ==
=== Military service ===
Jerry Franklin received an honorable discharge from the United States Air Force in 1970.

=== CPBI ===
In 1985, Jerry Franklin was appointed to the position of president and CEO of CPBI. Franklin is also a director of People's United Bank, and serves on the Board of Trustees for the Hartford Stage, the Hartford Club, and the Connecticut Boy Scouts Executive Council.
