= Run the Burbs =

Canadian television sitcom

- Genre: Sitcom
- Created by: Andrew Phung; Scott Townend
- Starring: Andrew Phung; Rakhee Morzaria
- Composer: Tyler Armes
- Country of origin: Canada
- No. of seasons: 3
- No. of episodes: 38

Production
- Executive producers: Shebli Zarghami; Aleysa Young; Andrew Phung; Scott Townend; Laszlo Barna; Nicole Butler; Bill Lundy; Karen Tsang
- Producer: Jessica Daniel
- Production locations: Hamilton, Ontario, Canada
- Cinematography: Gerald Packer
- Editor: Lindsay Allikas
- Production company: Pier 21 Films

Original release
- Network: CBC Television
- Release: January 5, 2022 – April 2, 2024

Run the Burbs is a Canadian television sitcom that premiered on CBC Television on January 5, 2022. The series stars Andrew Phung as Andrew Pham, a suburban stay-at-home dad of two children whose wife Camille (Rakhee Morzaria) is an entrepreneur.

The series was created by Phung and Scott Townend, and is produced by Pier 21 Films.

The series was shot in Hamilton, Ontario. It is set in the suburbs of the fictional city of Rockridge, which Phung modeled in part on his hometown of Calgary, Alberta.

The second season features new cast additions Gavin Crawford and Sharji Rasool, as well as a tribute episode to Candy Palmater, a first-season cast member who died in December 2021. In the United States, the series premiered on July 31, 2023, on The CW, before being pulled from its schedule in November 2023, concurrently with Hulu acquiring second window rights to the series. The first two seasons also remain available on CW's app and website and rights to season 3 have been purchased by the network.

CBC opted not to renew the show for a fourth season.

== Cast ==
- Andrew Phung as Andrew Pham
- Rakhee Morzaria as Andrew's wife Camille
- Zoriah Wong as Khia Pham, Andrew and Camille's queer teenage daughter
- Roman Pesino as Leo Pham, Andrew and Camille's son
- Ali Hassan as Camille's father Ramesh
- Julie Nolke as Camille's best friend Sam
- Jonathan Langdon as Hudson, a neighbour of the Phams
- Simone Miller as Hudson's daughter Mannix
- Samantha Wan as Cathy, owner of a local bubble tea shop
- Candy Palmater as Candy, a neighbour of the Phams
- Chris Locke as Sebastian, a neighbour of the Phams
- Aurora Browne as Barb

=== Guest appearances ===
- Jason "Kardinal Offishall" Harrow as himself (Season 1 Episode 1, Season 2 Episode 6)
- Jully Black as herself (Season 2 Episode 6)
- Nicole Power as Lisa, ex-wife of Hudson (Season 3 Episode 10)
- Paul Sun-Hyung Lee as Vernon Park (Season 3 Episode 13)

== Episodes ==
Season	Episodes	Originally released	
Season	Episodes	First released	Last released
1	12	January 5, 2022	April 13, 2022
2	13	January 4, 2023	March 29, 2023
3	13	January 9, 2024	April 2, 2024

=== Season 1 (2022) ===
No. overall	No. in season	Title	Directed by	Written by	Original release date	Canada viewers
1	1	"Blockbuster"	Aleysa Young	Andrew Phung & Scott Townend	January 5, 2022	386,000
Andrew and Camille have to scramble to save their neighbourhood block party after complications erupt. Andrew tries to coax neighbour Jason Harrow out of retirement to perform after a contact who claimed he could secure an appearance by Drake fails to come through, while Camille has to street race the local car club to secure a permit, but may be able to use her intimate knowledge of the neighbourhood as a suburban mom to her advantage.
2	2	"Heatwave"	Peter Wellington	Nelu Handa	January 12, 2022	N/A
Camille and Andrew are invited to the new neighbor's pool but have to cancel on Hudson first; Khia paints a mural at Bubble Bae and looks for validation; Andrew struggles when Leo goes to overnight camp.
3	3	"Carol the Conqueror"	Peter Wellington	Scott Townend & Andrew Phung	January 19, 2022	N/A
4	4	"Let's Go to the Movies"	Aleysa Young	Shebli Zarghami	January 26, 2022	N/A
5	5	"Independence Day"	Justin Wu	Wendy Litner	February 23, 2022	N/A
6	6	"First Date Date"	Justin Wu	Wendy Litner	March 2, 2022	N/A
7	7	"Phamily Matters"	Joyce Wong	Matt Kippen	March 9, 2022	N/A
8	8	"Raccoon Fever"	Melanie Orr	Shebli Zarghami	March 16, 2022	N/A
9	9	"Li Xi"	Joyce Wong	Andrew Phung & Scott Townend	March 23, 2022	N/A
10	10	"Phamily Games Night"	Melanie Orr	Matt Kippen	March 30, 2022	N/A
11	11	"Forever Young"	Aleysa Young	Jessie Gabe	April 6, 2022	N/A
12	12	"This Is Your Day"	Aleysa Young	Andrew Phung & Scott Townend	April 13, 2022	N/A

=== Season 2 (2023) ===
No. overall	No. in season	Title	Directed by	Written by	Original release date
13	1	"In Phocus"	Aleysa Young	Andrew Phung & Scott Townend	January 4, 2023
14	2	"Phamily Ties"	Aleysa Young	Nelu Handa	January 11, 2023
15	3	"Phamily Emergency"	Aleysa Young	Courtney Jane Walker	January 18, 2023
16	4	"Phriends and Enemies"	Zoe Hopkins	Andrew Phung & Scott Townend	January 25, 2023
17	5	"Phestival of Life"	Zoe Hopkins	Anthony Q. Farrell	February 1, 2023
18	6	"Phamily Budget"	Zoe Hopkins	Cathryn Naiker	February 8, 2023
19	7	"Phresh Start"	Pat Mills	Sara Peters	February 15, 2023
20	8	"Morning Phrenzy"	Pat Mills	Anthony Q. Farrell	February 22, 2023
21	9	"Culture Phest"	Joyce Wong	Nelu Handa	March 1, 2023
22	10	"Phlashback"	Scott Townend	Pat Mills	March 8, 2023
23	11	"Turn Lepht"	Courtney Jane Walker	Joyce Wong	March 15, 2023
24	12	"Phamily Affair"	Sherren Lee	Andrew Phung & Cathryn Naiker	March 22, 2023
25	13	"Phriendship"	Sherren Lee	Andrew Phung & Scott Townend	March 29, 2023

=== Season 3 (2024) ===
No. overall	No. in season	Title	Directed by	Written by	Original release date
26	1	"Phor Sale"	Aleysa Young	Andrew Phung & Scott Townend	January 9, 2024
27	2	"Phamily Doctor"	Aleysa Young	Jennica Harper	January 16, 2024
28	3	"Cottage Phever"	Aleysa Young	Nelu Handa & Sara Peters	January 23, 2024
29	4	"Phree Throws"	Pat Mills	Angelica Mendizabal	January 30, 2024
30	5	"Phunky Town"	Pat Mills	Jay Vaidya	February 6, 2024
31	6	"Phright Night"	Pat Mills	Scott Townend	February 13, 2024
32	7	"Unphased"	Joyce Wong	Sara Peters	February 20, 2024
33	8	"Stress Relieph"	Joyce Wong	Nelu Handa & Mandeq Hassan	February 27, 2024
34	9	"Phavourite Child"	Joyce Wong	Andrew Phung	March 5, 2024
35	10	"Phirst Love"	Sherren Lee	Jay Vaidya	March 12, 2024
36	11	"Holi-Day Phun"	Sherren Lee	Nelu Handa	March 19, 2024
37	12	"Vas Dephrens"	Zoe Hopkins	Jennica Harper	March 26, 2024
38	13	"Summer Phorecast"	Zoe Hopkins	Andrew Phung & Scott Townend	April 2, 2024
