= D.J. Demers =

Canadian-born stand-up comedian and actor (born 1986)

- Born: Donald James Demers, Jr.
- Spouse: Majalyn Demers (m. December 22, 2018)
- Children: 2

Comedy career
- Years active: 2009–present
- Medium: Stand-up; television
- Website: djdemers.com

D.J. Demers (born 1986) is a Canadian-born stand-up comedian, widely known for appearances on Season 11 of America's Got Talent, numerous late night talk shows, his online stand-up streaming specials, as well as on his 2023-2024 television series One More Time on CBC.

== Background ==
Born to Don and Joy Demers of Kitchener, Ontario, D.J. was diagnosed with hearing loss at age four; without hearing aids, he was considered deaf. Growing up, his parents and older sister helped him with the challenges he faced, including having spare hearing aids on hand. The hearing aids weren't waterproof and would stop functioning if he sweated too much, on the playground or during sports. In his youth, Demers played ice hockey extensively.

As a teenager, Demers' mother encouraged him to take a part time job in a used sporting equipment store — to become more comfortable speaking with people. He later graduated from Wilfrid Laurier University with a degree in business, and later worked in marketing at a Waterloo, Ontario tech company.

In 2009, Demers applied for and was selected by Richard Branson in a contest for an internship with Virgin Mobile. Each self-submitted homemade entry would outline ways young people could stay afloat in the economic downturn. Suggesting ditching a mobile phone for two tin cans connected by string, Demers' video was Branson's favorite entry.

In approximately 2011, Demers moved to Toronto to further his stand-up career, subsequently moving to Los Angeles. Demers is married, with two children.

== Career ==
Demers began performing comedy in his second year of university, making his first comedy club appearance at Yuk Yuk's. He won the 2013 Toronto Comedy Brawl and the Homegrown Comics Competition at the Just for Laughs Festival in 2014, and starred in a 13-segment television series, The D.J. Demers Show for AMI-tv. He won a Canadian Comedy Award for Best Breakout Artist in 2015.

He appeared on America's Got Talent in 2016, advancing to the Judge Cuts round but not making it to the live shows. In 2017 he appeared on Conan, and undertook a comedy tour of university and college campuses across the United States sponsored by hearing aid manufacturer Phonak. He has also appeared on episodes of the CBC Radio comedy series The Debaters.

He received a Juno Award nomination for Comedy Album of the Year at the Juno Awards of 2018, for his comedy album Indistinct Chatter.

In 2019 his stand-up comedy special Interpreted was streamed as a Crave original, and he headlined Comedy for a Cause, a stand-up show in Montreal that consisted entirely of comedians with physical disabilities. His second comedy album Uninterpreted, a selection of segments from the Crave special, was also released the same year.

In June 2023, CBC Television greenlit One More Time, a comedy series starring Demers as the manager of a used sporting goods store. The series premiered on CBC in January 2024, After the show, which the Toronto Star called "a love letter to mid-size Canadian cities," was cancelled after its inaugural season, full episodes remained available on Youtube.

Since 2024 he has hosted the annual All Access Comedy specials for the Halifax Comedy Festival and AMI-TV.

On October 3, 2026, he performed at Comedy Bar for the Toronto edition of Just for Laughs, in his final live performance before undergoing cochlear implant surgery.
