= Dan Beirne =

Canadian actor

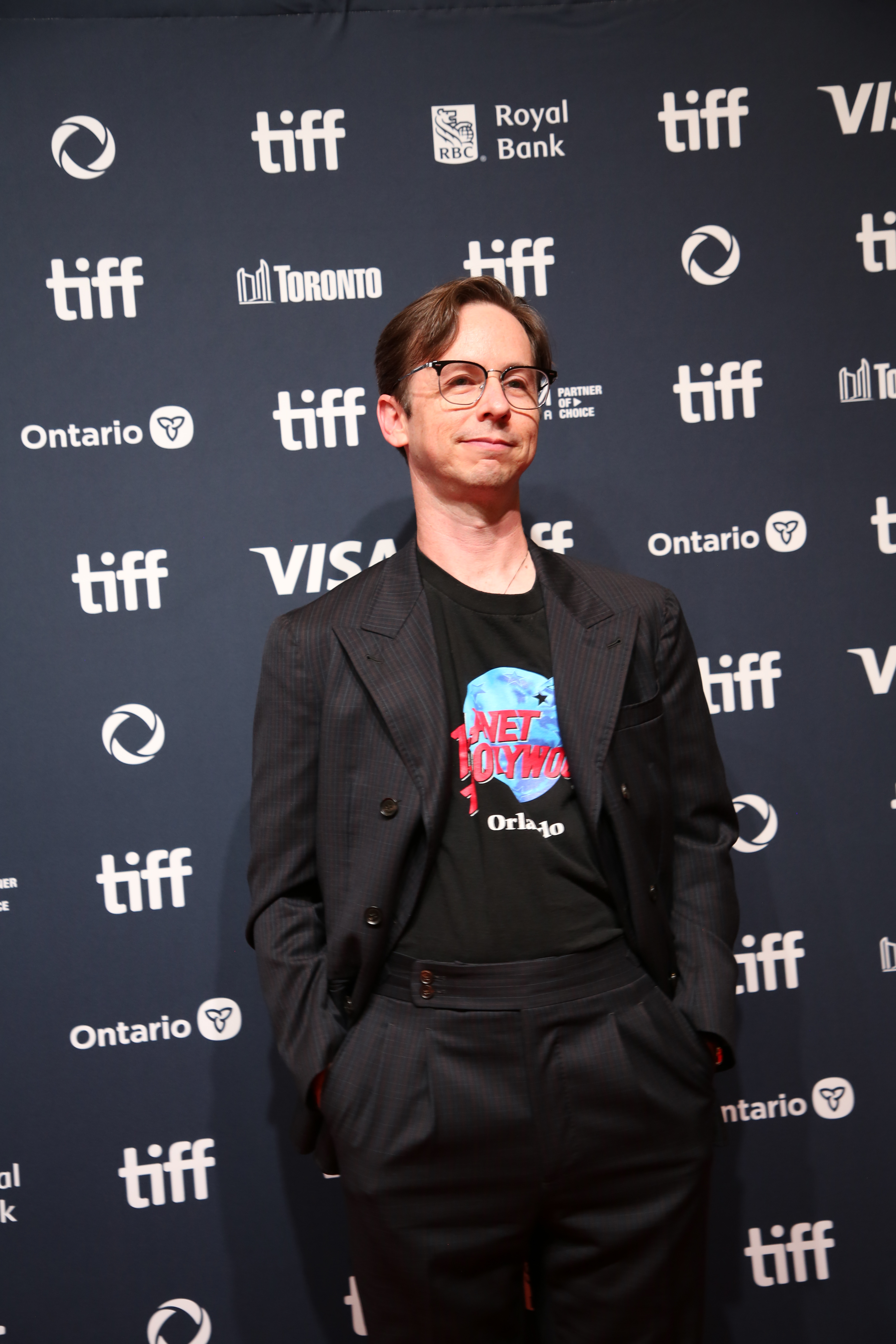
- Born: August 12, 1982 (age 44); Ottawa, Ontario, Canada
- Occupation: Actor
- Years active: 2006–present

Daniel Beirne (born August 12, 1982) is a Canadian actor. He is most noted for his performance as William Lyon Mackenzie King in the 2019 film The Twentieth Century, for which he won the Vancouver Film Critics Circle award for Best Actor in a Canadian Film at the Vancouver Film Critics Circle Awards 2019 and was a Canadian Screen Award nominee for Best Actor at the 8th Canadian Screen Awards.

He also starred in the films Great Great Great, Suck It Up, and I Like Movies. He has had television roles as Sonny Greer in Fargo, Gary Goldman in Workin' Moms, Nick in Ginny and Georgia, Tommy in The Guest Book, and the Drive-Thru Guy in Humour Resources, and appeared in the web series Space Riders: Division Earth, The Bitter End, Dad Drives, Ghost BFF and Detention Adventure.

He won a Canadian Screen Award in 2015 as a co-creator and producer of Space Riders: Division Earth, and has won two Canadian Comedy Awards as a writer and creator of Dad Drives and Space Riders: Division Earth.

He has also previously been a music writer and editor of the blog Said the Gramophone, selected by Time magazine as one of the 25 best blogs in the world in 2009.

== Filmography ==
=== Film ===
Year	Title	Role	Notes
2008	Who Is KK Downey?	Charles	
2009	The Trotsky	Dan	
2010	I Heart Doomsday	Dr. Maximillian Von Max	
2010	Peepers	Stu	
2011	The Future Is Now!	Young man	
2012	Beat Down	Henry	
2012	On the Road	Newlywed man	
2013	Three Night Stand	Aaron	
2014	We Were Wolves	Paul	
2017	Suck It Up	Granvilles	
2017	Great Great Great	Tom Anderson	
2018	The Dark	Officer Nate Stevens	
2019	American Hangman	Tom	
2019	The Twentieth Century	William Lyon Mackenzie King	
2019	White Lie	Sam Blumenthal	
2021	Awake	Gregg	
2022	I Like Movies	Owen	
2023	I Used to Be Funny	Tim	
2023	Priscilla	Joe Esposito	
2024	Paying for It	Chester Brown	
2026	Ready or Not 2: Here I Come	Kip Danforth	

=== Television ===
Year	Title	Role	Notes
2010	Perfect Plan	Evan	Television film
2012	Life with Boys	Zach	Episode: "Double Trouble with Boys"
2012	Flashpoint	Andrew	Episode: "No Kind of Life"
2012	Willed to Kill	Detective Manson	Television film
2014	Apple Mortgage Cake	Herman Flue	Television film
2014	Odd Squad	Beach man	Episode: "Skip Day/The Great Grinaldi"
2014–2023	Murdoch Mysteries	Ian Vagle	3 episodes
2015	Fargo	Sonny Greer	5 episodes
2016–2017	The Beaverton	Phil Paulson	2 episodes
2017	Reign	George	Episode: "With Friends Like These..."
2017	The Handmaid's Tale	Barista	Episode: "Late"
2017	American Gods	Ice cream vendor	Episode: "A Prayer for Mad Sweeney"
2017–2023	Workin' Moms	Gary Goldman	18 episodes
2018	Carter	Adam	Episode: "The Flood"
2018	The Guest Book	Tommy	Main role (season 2)
2019	You're the Worst	Tom	2 episodes
2019	The Bold Type	Toby	Episode: "The Deep End"
2019	Titans	Jacob Finlay	Episode: "Aqualad"
2020	Mrs. America	Hamilton Jordan	Episode: "Reagan"
2021	Humour Resources	Drive-thru guy	Main role; 4 episodes
2021	The Moodys	Dustin Lundgren	Season 2, episode 8
2021	Hudson & Rex	Griffin Birch	Episode: "Rex Marks the Spot"
2021–present	Ginny & Georgia	Nick	Recurring role
2022	High School	Mr. Gardner	2 episodes
2022	Guillermo del Toro's Cabinet of Curiosities	Deputy Davis	Episode: "The Autopsy"
2022	Transplant	Ezra / Liam	Episode: "And So It Goes"
2023	Red Iron Road	Marquise D'Urfe	Episode: "VRDLK: Family of Vurdulak"
2023	Accused	ADA Roger Doty	Episode: "Jack's Story"
2023	Gen V	Social Media Jeff	Recurring role
2024	Davey & Jonesie's Locker	Mr. Schneider	Main role
2024	One More Time	Wayne	Main role
2025	Twisted Metal	Jeremy	Recurring role

=== Web ===
Year	Title	Role	Notes
2009	The Bitter End	Bernard Price	6 episodes
2012–2014	Dad Drives	Malcolm	11 episodes
2014–2017	Space Riders: Division Earth	Philip	23 episodes
2015	The Plateaus	Guille	Episode: "The Badger Trip"
2018	Ghost BFF	Mitchell	7 episodes
2019	Detention Adventure	Mr. Applebaum	6 episodes
2019	Bigfoot	Mr. Ferret	Episode: "Endangered"
2019	Bit Playas	Casting director #2	Episode: "Auditions"
2020	The Amazing Gayl Pile	Rick	5 episodes
