= Andrew Phung =

Canadian actor and comedian

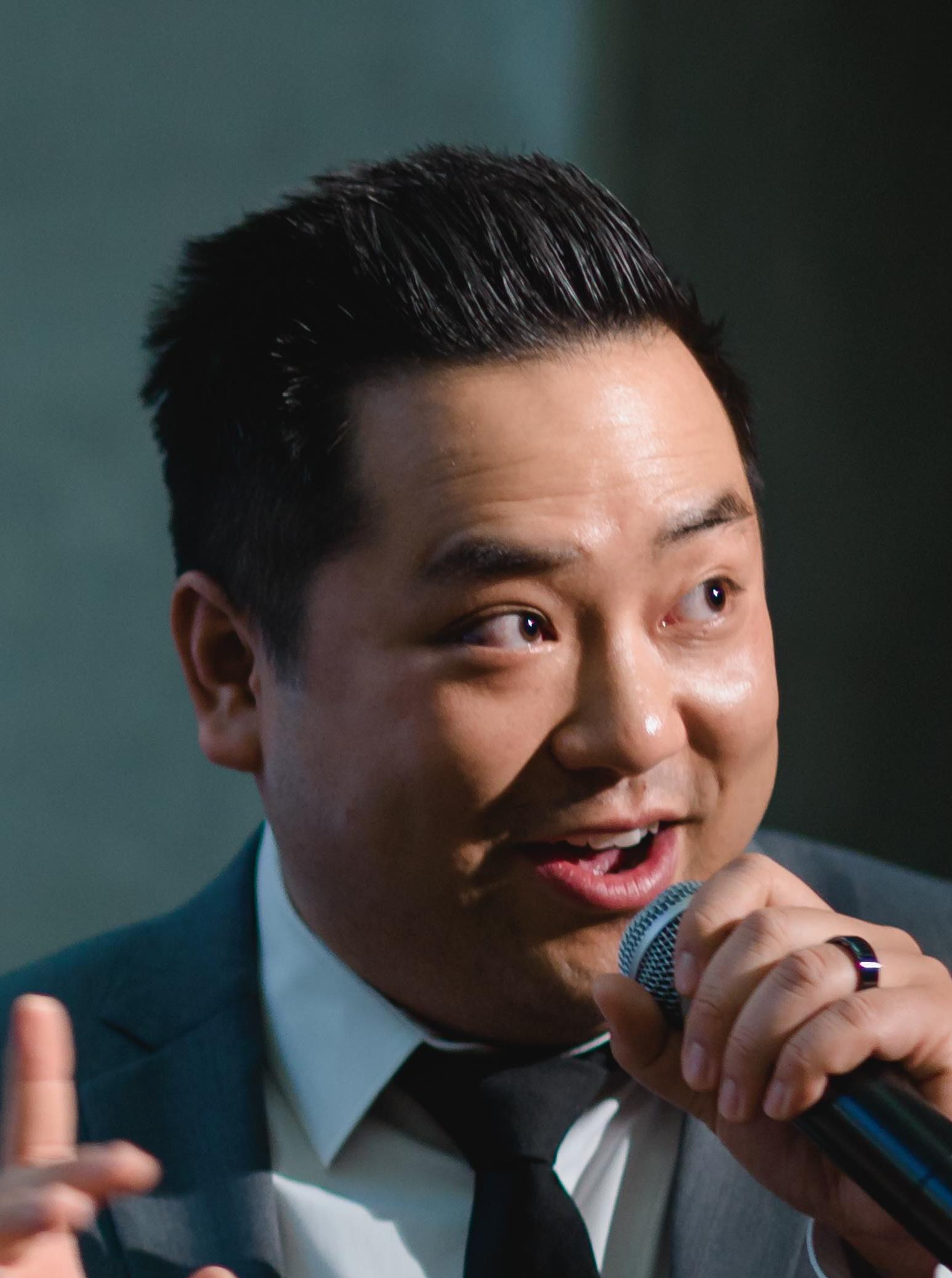
- Phung in 2014
- Born: January 26, 1984 (age 42); Calgary, Alberta, Canada
- Education: University of Calgary
- Years active: 2009–present
- Known for: Kim's Convenience, Run the Burbs
- Spouse: Tamara Sharpe (m. 2013)
- Children: 2

Andrew Phung (born January 26, 1984) is a Canadian actor, improviser, and comedian. He played Kimchee Han on the CBC Television sitcom Kim's Convenience, a role for which he was a five-time Canadian Screen Award winner for Best Supporting Actor in a Comedy Series. He is also the co-creator of the sitcom Run the Burbs, on which he plays Andrew Pham.

== Background ==
Andrew Phung was born and raised in Calgary, Alberta, and attended Bishop McNally High School. Phung's father is of Chinese Vietnamese descent; his mother is Vietnamese. He joined the Loose Moose Theatre Company when he was sixteen years old. As of 2020, he is a senior ensemble performer and instructor with the theatre. He studied economics at the University of Calgary. and worked as a non-profit director before pursuing acting.

== Career ==
In 2008, Phung joined the comedy group Sciencebear, which created and produced comedic shorts. In 2009, they produced the film Sketch on a $100 budget, and submitted it to the 2010 Calgary International Film Festival.

In 2009, Phung was named one of Calgary's Top 40 under 40 by Avenue Magazine. That same year, he was a featured cast member on the television series Drafted on the Score Television Network.

Phung is the co-creator of the hit improvised comedy shows Past your Bedtime, Northeast: The Show, and Kill Hard.

From 2015 to 2016, Phung co-wrote and starred in two seasons of Cowtown, a sketch comedy series produced by Nur Films and Telus Optik.

From 2016 through 2021, Phung played the role of Kimchee in the CBC Television sitcom Kim's Convenience. He won Canadian Screen Awards for Canadian Screen Award for Best Supporting Actor in a Comedy Series at the 5th Canadian Screen Awards in 2017, the 6th Canadian Screen Awards in 2018, and the 8th Canadian Screen Awards in 2020. In March 2021, it was announced that despite being renewed to a 6th season, Kim's Convenience would be ending after five seasons due to the departure of the show runners.

Post-Kim's Convenience, Phung stars in the lead role on Run the Burbs for CBC, for which he is a co-creator.

Phung won two awards at the 9th Canadian Screen Awards in 2021: his fourth award for Best Supporting Actor in a Comedy Series, for Kim's Convenience, and Best Host on a Web Program or Series for his role as host of the 2019 Canadian Improv Games.

He is slated to host the 14th Canadian Screen Awards in 2026.

== Personal life ==
In 2013, Phung married Tamara Sharpe. They have two sons together.

Phung is the co-founder of YYCSolediers, an online sneaker group that produces Sneaker SWAP, a Calgary-based sneaker event. He is deeply involved in Youth Central, a non profit organization that helps youth get involved in their communities.

== Filmography ==
=== Television ===
| Year | Title | Role | Notes |
|---|---|---|---|
| 2014 | Let's Talk English | Host/Main Cast | 120 episodes |
| 2015 | Young Drunk Punk | Waiter | |
| 2015–2016 | Cowtown | Main Cast | |
| 2016–2021 | Kim's Convenience | Kimchee | Winner – Canadian Screen Award for Best Performance by an Actor in a Featured Supporting Role or Guest Role in a Comedic Series - 2017, 2018, 2020, 2021 |
| 2016–present | The Beaverton | Eddie Zheng | |
| 2020–2021 | Wynonna Earp | Casey | |
| 2022–2024 | Run the Burbs | Andrew Pham | |
| 2022 | LOL: Last One Laughing Canada | Himself | |

=== Film ===
| Year | Title | Role | Notes |
|---|---|---|---|
| 2018 | Little Italy | Luigi | |
| 2020 | Events Transpiring Before, During and After a High School Basketball Game | Brent | |
| 2024 | Lucky Star | Darren | |
