= 2024 in Canadian television =

The following is a list of events affecting Canadian television in 2024. Events listed include television show debuts, finales, cancellations, and channel launches, closures and rebrandings.

== Events ==
=== January ===
Date	Event	Source
11	After over 13 years on the air, Groupe TVA's only children's channel Yoopa ended operations. The channel was replaced with QUB, a TV broadcast version of Groupe TVA's Qub Radio.	

=== February ===
Date	Event	Source
8	Bell Media announces significant cutbacks at the CTV News division, including the cancellation of all noon-hour and weekend local newscasts outside of a few major metropolitan markets on its CTV owned-and-operated stations, cuts to programming at CTV News Channel and BNN Bloomberg, and the cancellation of its newsmagazine W5 as a regular program.	

=== April ===
Date	Event	Source
9	Moi et Cie is rebranded as Témoin.	
25	Amazon Prime Video announces it has reached a deal with the National Hockey League and Rogers Communications to exclusively carry national Monday night regular season NHL games (in English) during the 2024-25 and 2025-26 seasons.	

=== June ===
Date	Event	Source
6	Eastlink ends their dispute with Corus Entertainment and re-adds their specialty channels back on some new Theme Packs. While TiVo Stream customers would get all of them, TiVo Classic customers will only be able to access HGTV, Food Network, W Network, Showcase and History.	
10	Rogers Sports & Media announces a multi-year agreement with Warner Bros. Discovery, under which it will assume rights to many of its factual and lifestyle television brands beginning January 1, 2025, including most prominently Discovery, Food Network, and HGTV among others, ending their long-term associations with Bell Media and Corus Entertainment specialty channels respectively. Rogers also announced an agreement with NBCUniversal to relaunch the Bravo brand in Canada beginning on September 1, 2024. Corus and Bell stated that other WBD deals (Cartoon Network and Adult Swim for the former and HBO for the latter) are not affected by these changes.	

=== July ===
Date	Event	Source
26–August 11	The 2024 Summer Olympics in Paris, France airs on CBC, CBC Gem, Ici Télé, and cable networks TSN, RDS, and Sportsnet.	

=== September ===
Date	Event	Source
1	After 25 years of operation, the Oprah Winfrey Network was shut down by Corus Entertainment. The channel's broadcast license was surrendered to the CRTC on October 8.	
1	OLN is rebranded and relaunched as Bravo, under license from NBCUniversal.	
7	The Canadian Football League returns to Canadian over-the-air television for the first time in 17 years with a package of Saturday afternoon contests on CTV.	

=== October ===
Date	Event	Source
22	The CRTC announces the approval of Uvagut TV, an Inuktitut language television channel previously carried only in Nunavut, for national distribution by all Canadian cable and direct broadcast satellite providers, beginning January 2025.	

=== December ===
Date	Event	Source
30	Corus Entertainment rebranded specialty channels HGTV Canada and Food Network Canada as Home Network and Flavour Network, respectively.	
31	MTV Canada was shut down by Bell Media, with the unaired new episodes of its original programming Jersey Shore: Family Vacation, The Challenge and Ridiculousness moving over to sister channel Much.	
31	The WWE Network was shut down by Rogers Sports & Media, due to Netflix's new deal with the WWE taking place the next day.	
31	After being confirmed by multiple TV service providers, Cooking Channel and the original Magnolia Network, both owned by Corus Entertainment, ceased broadcasting. A new version of Magnolia Network was launched under Rogers Sports & Media immediately thereafter the next day.	

== Programs ==
=== Programs debuting in 2024 ===
Start date	Show	Channel	Source
January 8	MasterChef Québec	TVA	
January 9	One More Time	CBC	
January 10	Wild Cards	CBC	
January 18	Lakay Nou	Ici TOU.TV	
January 19	Late Bloomer	Crave	
January 21	Sight Unseen	CTV	
January 26	Ghosting with Luke Hutchie and Matthew Finlan	CBC Gem	
February 5	Timber Titans	Discovery	
February 7	Allegiance	CBC	
February 8	The Great Canadian Pottery Throw Down	CBC	
February 8	An Optimist's Guide to the Planet	Crave	
February 22	Law & Order Toronto: Criminal Intent	Citytv	
March 5	Treaty Road	APTN	
March 8	Gangnam Project	CBC Kids	
March 15	Beyond Black Beauty	Family Channel	
March 22	The Trades	Crave	
April 1	Dylan's Playtime Adventures	CBC Kids	
May 1	Potluck Ladies	Hollywood Suite	
May 7	Pow Wow Chow	APTN	
May 8	Hop	CBC Kids	
May 11	Warrior Up!	APTN	
May 30	Geek Girl	Netflix	
June 24	The Squeaky Wheel: Canada	AMI-tv	
July 12	Made for TV with Boman Martinez-Reid	Crave	
August 23	Don't Even	Crave	
September 2	My Haunted Hometown	T+E	
September 5	House of Ali	HGTV	
September 8	Old Enough!	TVO	
September 9	Quel talent!	Noovo	
September 19	The Rebuild: Inside the Montreal Canadiens	Crave	
September 20	The Tragically Hip: No Dress Rehearsal	Prime Video	
September 21	Paid in Full: The Battle for Black Music	CBC Gem	
September 24	Murder in a Small Town	Global	
September 27	So Long, Marianne	Crave	
October 2	Mark McKinney Needs a Hobby	CTV	
October 8	Todd Talbot Builds: The Passive House Project	Cottage Life	
October 11	The Office Movers	Crave	
October 14	Barney's World	Treehouse	
October 30	Anna Comes Home (Le retour d'Anna Brodeur)	Crave	
December 6	The Sticky	Amazon Prime Video	
December 31	Slaycation	Crave	
Unknown date	Indigenous Art Adventures	APTN	

=== Programs ending in 2024 ===
End date	Show	Channel	First aired	Status	Source
January 19	Transplant	CTV	2020	Ended	
March 23	W5	CTV	1966	Ended	
April 2	Run the Burbs	CBC Television	2022	Canceled	
May 3	CityLine	Citytv	1984	Canceled	
May 8	Big Brother Canada	Global	2013	Canceled	

=== Specials ===
Start date	Show	Channel	Source
March 10	Nobody Wants to Talk About Jacob Appelbaum	Documentary	
March 24	Juno Awards of 2024	CBC	
May 31	12th Canadian Screen Awards	CBC	
September 14	2024 Canadian Country Music Awards	CTV	
October 24	It's Not Funny Anymore: Vice to Proud Boys	Documentary	
November 17	111th Grey Cup	CTV, TSN	
December 8	26th Quebec Cinema Awards	Noovo	

== Networks and services ==
=== Network launches ===
Network	Type	Launch date	Notes
QUB	Cable and satellite	January 11	
APTN Languages	Cable and satellite	September 1	

=== Network rebrandings ===
Old network name	New network name	Type	Conversion date	Notes
Moi et Cie	Temoin	Cable/satellite	April 9	
OLN	Bravo (new)	Cable/satellite	September 1	Operated under license from NBCUniversal.
GiNX eSports TV Canada	Super Channel Quest	Cable/satellite	September 4	
Club Illico	Illico+	Cable/satellite	September 4	
HGTV Canada (original)	Home Network	Cable/satellite	December 31	Outgoing rightsholders to this brand; channels operated by Corus Entertainment. New channels under this brand, operated by Rogers Sports & Media, launched on January 1, 2025.
Food Network Canada (original)	Flavour Network	Cable/satellite	December 31	Outgoing rightsholders to this brand; channels operated by Corus Entertainment. New channels under this brand, operated by Rogers Sports & Media, launched on January 1, 2025.

=== Network closures ===
Network	Type	Closure date	Notes
Yoopa	Cable/satellite	January 11	
MTV2	Cable/satellite	March 29	
TV Japan	Cable/satellite	March 31	Indirectly replaced by Jme direct-to-consumer streaming service
OWN Canada	Cable/satellite	September 1	U.S. programming rights transferred to Citytv+ on January 1, 2025
Vrai	Cable/satellite	October 23	Closed following integration of content into Illico+
WWE Network	Cable/satellite	December 31	Most programming rights transferred to Netflix on January 1, 2025
MTV	Cable/satellite	December 31	Most programming rights transferred to Much and/or Paramount+
Cooking Channel	Cable/satellite	December 31	U.S. programming rights transferred to Citytv+ on January 1, 2025
Magnolia Network (original)	Cable/satellite	December 31	Outgoing rightsholder to this brand; channel operated by Corus Entertainment. A new channel under this brand, operated by Rogers Sports & Media, launched on January 1, 2025.

== Deaths ==
Date	Name	Age	Notes	Sources
April 24	Bob Cole	90	Sportscaster and play-by-play voice for Hockey Night in Canada	
May 15	Darren Dutchyshen	57	Sportscaster and anchor for TSN's SportsCentre	
October 11	Mike Bullard	67	Comedian and host of CTV's Open Mike with Mike Bullard and Global's The Mike Bullard Show	

== See also ==
- List of Canadian films of 2024
