= 13th Canadian Screen Awards =

Awards ceremony for film, TV, and digital media of 2024

- Date: 30 May – 1 June 2025
- Location: Canadian Broadcasting Centre, Toronto, Ontario
- Hosted by: Lisa Gilroy

Highlights
- Most awards: Universal Language (film, 6); Canada's Drag Race (TV, 8)
- Most nominations: Universal Language (film, 13); Law & Order Toronto: Criminal Intent (TV, 20)
- Best Motion Picture: The Apprentice
- Best Dramatic Series: Law & Order Toronto: Criminal Intent
- Best Comedy Series: Children Ruin Everything

Television/radio coverage
- Network: CBC Television; CBC Gem

The 13th Canadian Screen Awards were presented by the Academy of Canadian Cinema and Television from 30 May to 1 June 2025, to honour achievements in Canadian film, television and digital media production in 2024. The main gala was held on 1 June, hosted by comedian Lisa Gilroy, and was broadcast live on CBC Television and streaming on CBC Gem.

Nominees were announced on 26 March. Universal Language received the most nominations in film categories with 13, while Law & Order Toronto: Criminal Intent topped the field in television categories with 20 nominations. Canada's Drag Race was the most-awarded work overall with eight, while Universal Language would win the most awards in film categories with six.

== Ceremony information ==
The Canadian Screen Week programme of events prior to the main gala (including non-televised ceremonies for technical and genre categories) were consolidated and reduced to two days (30 and 31 May).

After multiple ceremonies in which television coverage was limited to an hour-long virtual ceremony or tape delayed highlights special on CBC Television, the academy announced that live coverage of the gala ceremony would return. It was initially announced that this coverage would be exclusive to the CBC's streaming platform CBC Gem. Just days before the ceremony, the academy announced that the ceremony would in fact air on CBC Television as well, indicating that the original streaming-only decision had been made in part because of the possibility of conflicts with CBC coverage of the 2025 Stanley Cup playoffs; Game 7 of the Eastern Conference final had been scheduled for 1 June if necessary, but the series was completed on 28 May after five games, thus freeing the 1 June date.

Barry Hertz of The Globe and Mail felt that the situation could have been avoided entirely if the awards had reverted to their traditional early spring scheduling, instead of retaining the late-May scheduling that was introduced in 2024. According to Academy CEO Tammy Frick, the academy had chosen to stick with the late-May scheduling as that aligned the awards with the annual television upfronts season, as well as the period of industry activity between the Cannes Film Festival and the Banff World Media Festival.

=== Category changes ===
==== Film ====
- The eligibility criteria for films, which were dropped to a minimum of four commercial screenings at the 9th Canadian Screen Awards due to the impact of the COVID-19 pandemic on film distribution in 2020, were increased to five commercial screenings.
- Due to evidence that some first-time film directors have mistakenly overlooked submitting their films for the John Dunning Best First Feature Award in the past, first-time film directors would now be automatically considered in that category regardless of whether they had actively submitted for it or not.
- Minor technical changes were also added to the eligibility criteria for Best Original Score and Best Art Direction or Production Design.

==== Television ====
- Actors who played the same character in a series of television films would now be considered for the series performance categories instead of the television film performance categories.
- People credited as contributing writers would now be eligible to be included in writing nominations.
- The categories for Best Talk Series, Best Entertainment News Series and Best Morning Show were collapsed into a single new category for Best Talk or Entertainment News Series.
- The category for Best Performing Arts Program was discontinued, with programs in that category now eligible for either Best TV Movie or Best Variety and Entertainment Special.
- The category for Best Performance in Animation was renamed Best Voice Performance, considering voice acting across all forms of visual presentation.
- The category for Best Ensemble Performance in a Drama Series was discontinued, although the ensemble category for comedy series was retained.
- Minor technical changes were also introduced in music categories, as well as improved clarity about the distinction between supporting and guest performances.

==== Digital media ====
- The category for Best Live Production for Social Media was collapsed into Best Interactive Production, and may now also submit in the television category for Best Live Entertainment Special if appropriate.
- A single merged category for Best Immersive Experience is now presented if the number of eligible submissions in either Best Immersive Experience, Fiction or Best Immersive Experience, Non-Fiction falls below six. Separate categories would continue to be presented if submissions exceed that cutoff.

==== News and sports ====
- The separate categories for Best News Special (for pre-planned broadcasts about known news events such as elections) and Best Breaking News Special (for live coverage of unforeseen news events), which were introduced for the 12th Canadian Screen Awards but not actually presented that year, were collapsed back down into a single category for Best Live News Special.

== Special awards ==
The special award recipients were announced on 5 March.

- Board of Directors Tribute: Ellis Jacob, Denise Robert
- Changemaker Award: Marsha Greene
- Radius Award: Manny Jacinto
- Sustainable Production Award: This Hour Has 22 Minutes

== Other notes ==
Kiefer Sutherland introduced the In Memoriam segment, including a special tribute to his father Donald Sutherland. The In Memoriam reel was accompanied by a live performance by Murray Lightburn of his song "Once Upon a Time in Montreal".

== Film ==
Best Motion Picture	Best Direction
The Apprentice — Daniel Bekerman; Darkest Miriam — Brian Robertson, Julie Baldassi; Gamma Rays (Les Rayons gamma) — Henry Bernadet, Vuk Stojanovic, Jean-Martin Gagnon; Universal Language (Une langue universelle) — Sylvain Corbeil; Village Keeper — Enrique Miguel Baniqued, Karen Chapman; Who Do I Belong To — Annick Blanc, Maria Gracia Turgeon	Matthew Rankin, Universal Language (Une langue universelle); Ara Ball, Hurricane Boy Fuck You Tabarnak! (L'Ouragan F.Y.T.); Henry Bernadet, Gamma Rays (Les Rayons gammma); Atom Egoyan, Seven Veils; Naomi Jaye, Darkest Miriam; Meryam Joobeur, Who Do I Belong To
Best Lead Performance in a Comedy Film	Best Lead Performance in a Drama Film
Cate Blanchett, Rumours; Rojina Esmaeili, Universal Language (Une langue universelle); Kaniehtiio Horn, Seeds; Emily Lê, Paying for It; Pirouz Nemati, Universal Language (Une langue universelle); Taylor Olson, Look at Me; Paul Spence, Deaner '89; Maïla Valentir, Ababooned (Ababouiné)	Sebastian Stan, The Apprentice; Oluniké Adeliyi, Village Keeper; Christine Beaulieu, The Thawing of Ice (La fonte des glaces); Sean Dalton, Skeet; Chaïmaa Zineddine Elidrissi, Gamma Rays (Les Rayons gammma); Britt Lower, Darkest Miriam; Carrie-Anne Moss, Die Alone; Oshim Ottawa, Atikamekw Suns (Soleils Atikamekw)
Best Supporting Performance in a Comedy Film	Best Supporting Performance in a Drama Film
Graham Greene, Seeds; Sandrine Bisson, 1995; Roy Dupuis, Rumours; Danielle Fichaud, Universal Language (Une langue universelle); Will Sasso, Deaner '89; Mani Soleymanlou, Universal Language (Une langue universelle); Saba Vahedyousefi, Universal Language (Une langue universelle); Mary Walsh, Deaner '89	Jeremy Strong, The Apprentice; Lise-Yolande Awashish, Atikamekw Suns (Soleils Atikamekw); Zahra Bentham, Village Keeper; Lothaire Bluteau, The Thawing of Ice (La fonte des glaces); Micah Mensah-Jatoe, Village Keeper; Tom Mercier, Darkest Miriam; Sandra Oh, Can I Get a Witness?; Maxine Simpson, Village Keeper
Best Original Screenplay	Best Adapted Screenplay
Universal Language (Une langue universelle) — Matthew Rankin, Pirouz Nemati, Ila Firouzabadi; Gamma Rays (Les Rayons gammma) — Henry Bernadet, Isabelle Brouillette, Nicolas Krief; Mongrels — Jerome Yoo; Seeds — Kaniehtiio Horn; The Thawing of Ice (La fonte des glaces) — Sarah Lévesque, François Péloquin; Village Keeper — Karen Chapman	Paying for It — Sook-Yin Lee, Joanne Sarazen; Blue Sky Jo (La petite et le vieux) — Sébastien Girard; Darkest Miriam — Naomi Jaye; Seven Veils — Atom Egoyan; Sharp Corner — Jason Buxton; Shepherds (Bergers) — Sophie Deraspe, Mathyas Lefebure
Best Feature Length Documentary	Best Short Documentary
Yintah — Jennifer Wickham, Brenda Michell, Michael Toledano, Bob Moore, Sam Vinal, Doris Rosso, Daniel Cross, Mila Aung-Thwin; Analogue Revolution: How Feminist Media Changed the World — Marusya Bociurkiw, Eponine Young; Disco's Revenge — Peter Mishara, Omar Majeed, Christina Piovesan, Noah Segal, Sam Sutherland, Dave Harris, Nile Rodgers, Vivian Scott Chew, Stanley Nelson Jr.; Okurimono — Laurence Lévesque, Rosalie Chicoine Perreault, Catherine Boily; Wilfred Buck — Lisa Jackson, Lauren Grant, Alicia Smith, Jennifer Baichwal, Nicholas de Pencier, David Christensen	Hello Stranger — Amélie Hardy, Sarah Mannering, Fanny Drew; Afterwards (Après-coups) — Romane Garant Chartrand, Nathalie Cloutier; The Bird in My Backyard — Ryan Wilkes; perfectly a strangeness — Alison McAlpine; Who Loves the Sun — Arshia Shakiba, Zaynê Akyol
Best Live Action Short Drama	Best Performance in a Live Action Short Drama
On a Sunday at Eleven — Alicia K. Harris; Are You Scared to Be Yourself Because You Think That You Might Fail? — Emily Harris, Bec Pecaut; Bibi's Dog Is Dead — Shervin Kermani; Fantas — Halima Elkhatabi; Gender Reveal — Mo Matton, Léonie Hurtubise	Bryn McAuley, Bibi's Dog Is Dead; Ali Eldurssi, Hatch; Tara Hakim, I Never Promised You a Jasmine Garden; Laura Luu, The Little Shopping Trolley (Le petit panier à roulettes); Lío Mehiel, Are You Scared to Be Yourself Because You Think That You Might Fail?; Zoë Peak, On a Sunday at Eleven; Ralph Prosper, Someone's Trying to Get In; Ayo Tsalithaba, Gender Reveal
Best Animated Short	John Dunning Best First Feature
Maybe Elephants — Torill Kove, Lise Fearnley, Maral Mohammadian, Tonje Skar Reiersen; Beaupré the Giant (Géant Beaupré) — Alain Fournier; Detours Ahead — Esther Cheung; The Little Ancestor (La petite ancêtre) — Alexa Tremblay-Francœur; Society of Clothes (Les gens dans l'armoire) — Jeong Dahee, Emmanuel-Alain Raynal, Pierre Baussaron, Christine Noël	Village Keeper — Karen Chapman; Deaner '89 — Sam McGlynn; Hunting Daze (Jour de chasse) — Annick Blanc; Mongrels — Jerome Yoo; Seeds — Kaniehtiio Horn; Who Do I Belong To — Meryam Joobeur
Best Art Direction/Production Design	Best Cinematography
Louisa Schabas, Universal Language (Une langue universelle); Phillip Barker, Adriana Bogaard and Mark McGann, Seven Veils; Brian Garvey, Andrea Perez Leon and David Edgar, Humane; Zosia Mackenzie, John O'Regan, Márton Vörös and Rita Hetényi, Rumours; Carol Spier, The Shrouds	Gayle Ye, Paying for It; Maya Bankovic, The Invisibles; Vincent Gonneville, Shepherds (Bergers); Nick Haight, Young Werther; Catherine Lutes, Close to You
Best Costume Design	Best Editing
Negar Nemati, Universal Language (Une langue universelle); Anne Dixon, The Shrouds; Debra Hanson, Seven Veils; Hanna Puley, Humane; Mara Zigler, Matt and Mara	Xi Feng, Universal Language (Une langue universelle); Anna Catley, Paying for It; Anna Catley, We Forgot to Break Up; Christopher Donaldson, The Shrouds; Curt Lobb, I Used to Be Funny; Jorge Weisz, Sharp Corner
Best Sound Editing	Best Sound Mixing
Robert Bertola, Jill Purdy, David Rose, Paul Germann, Steve Baine and Fraser Gee, The Shrouds; Tim Atkins and Michelle Hwu, In a Violent Nature; Elma Bello, Bret Killoran, Elma Bello and Chris Russell, Darkest Miriam; Gabe Knox, Lucas Prokaziuk, Stefan Fraticelli and Justin Helle, Matt and Mara; Tyler Whitham, Joseph Fraioli, Kevin Banks, Dashen Naidoo, Davi Aquino, Claire Dobson, Krystin Hunter, Dustin Harris, Stefan Fraticelli, Jason Charbonneau and William Kellerman, Code 8: Part II	Christian Cooke, Mark Zsifkovits, Trevor Goulet, Peter Persaud and Daniel Moctezuma, The Shrouds; Julian Ardila, Chris Russell, Brianna Todd, Bret Killoran, Jon Lawless, Dallas Boyes and Diego Colombo, Backspot; Tyler Bogaert and Oliver Wickham, In a Violent Nature; Matthew Chan, Graham Rogers, Trevor Goulet, Randy Wilson, Ron Mellegers and Paul Lynch, Code 8: Part II; Gabe Knox, Ian Reynolds, Paul Lynch and Ron Mellegers, Matt and Mara
Best Original Score	Best Original Song
Mychael Danna, Seven Veils; Amin Bhatia, The Wall Street Boy (Kipkemboi); Spencer Creaghan, I Don't Know Who You Are; Darren Fung, The Silent Planet; Todor Kobakov, The Invisibles	Torquil Campbell, "Revolutionary Heart" — We Forgot to Break Up; Mark Clennon, "I Don't Know Who You Are" — I Don't Know Who You Are; Paul Spence, Michael Phillip Heppner, Ian Kerr Wilson, Guillaume Marc Antoine Tremblay and Stan Pietrusik, "The Power of the Tribe" — Deaner '89
Best Makeup	Best Hair
Colin Penman, Brandi Boulet and Sean Sansom, The Apprentice; Rachel Affolter, Alexandra Anger and Monica Pavez, Humane; Diane Mazur, Alexandra Anger and Monica Pavez, The Shrouds; Doug Morrow, Deaner '89; Marie Salvado, Universal Language (Une langue universelle)	Michelle Côté, Charlotte Delaet and Sandra Kelly, The Apprentice; Paula Fleet, The Shrouds; Leanne Morrison-Freed and Stracey Millar, Humane; Chiara Naccarata, Out Come the Wolves; Nathan Rival and Tori Binns, Seven Veils
Best Cinematography in a Documentary	Best Editing in a Documentary
Michael Toledano, Yintah; Sébastien Blais, Okurimono; Ashley Iris Gill, Disco's Revenge; Christopher Nunn, Intercepted; Olivier Tétreault, Claude Demers and François Messier-Rheault, Diary of a Father (Journal d'un père)	David Schmidt, Wilfred Buck; Jon Affolter, Heath Affolter, Nathan Affolter and Thomas Affolter, Altona; Marie-Pier Grignon, Okurimono; Geoff Klein, I Shall Not Hate; Sonia Godding Togobo, A Mother Apart
Best Original Music in a Documentary	Best Sound Design in a Documentary
Murray Lightburn, Any Other Way: The Jackie Shane Story; Olivier Alary and Johannes Malfatti, Yintah; Wilhelm Brandl, Okurimono; Richard Reed Parry, Adrianne and the Castle; Sei Nakauchi Pelletier, Diary of a Father (Journal d'un père)	Marie-Pierre Grenier, Camille Demers-Lambert, Nataq Huault, Olivier Germain and Alexis Farand, Okurimono; Benoît Dame and Catherine Van Der Donckt, Yintah; Alex Lane, Intercepted; Patrice LeBlanc and Luc Boudrias, Diary of a Father (Journal d'un père); David Rose, Wilfred Buck
Best Visual Effects	Best Casting in a Film
Brian Huynh, Sophia Jooyeon Lee, Steven Huynh, Justin Perreault and Michael Davison, Code 8: Part II; Rob Geddes, Kim Walker, Sean Gilhooly, Gavin Jung, Tom Mangat and Gordon Oscar, Levels; Peter McAuley, Guillaume Le Gouez, Pierre Procoudine Gorsky and Aurore Rousset, The Shrouds; Robert Munroe, Tim M. Townsend, Marcin Kolendo and Leo Bovell, Sharp Corner; Ricardo Santillana, Evren Boisjoli and Julia Aubry, Hunting Daze (Jour de chasse)	Marilou Richer, Universal Language (Une langue universelle); Deirdre Bowen, The Shrouds; Avy Kaufman, Rumours; Jason Knight and John Buchan, Backspot; Jenny Lewis, Sara Kay and Kalene Osborne, Paying for It
Golden Screen Award
Sisters and Neighbors! (Nos belles-sœurs) — Denise Robert

== Television ==
=== Programs ===
Best Drama Series	Best Comedy Series
Law & Order Toronto: Criminal Intent — Erin Haskett, Tassie Cameron, Amy Cameron, David Valleau, Alex Patrick, Tex Antonucci, Wanda Chaffey; Allegiance — Anar Ali, Mark Ellis, Stephanie Morgenstern, Erin Haskett, Nicole Mendes, David Valleau, Tex Antonucci, Brad Van Arragon; Bones of Crows — Marie Clements, Trish Dolman, Christine Haebler, Sam Grana; Potluck Ladies — Shazia Javed; Sight Unseen — Virginia Rankin, Charles Cooper, Carolyn Newman, John Morayniss, Karen Troubetzkoy, Nikolijne Troubetzkoy, John Fawcett, Derek Schreyer	Children Ruin Everything — Mark Montefiore, Kurt Smeaton, Meaghan Rath, Anita Kapila, Chuck Tatham, Andrew De Angelis, Kathleen Phillips, Alyson Richards, Max Wolfond; Don't Even — Laszlo Barna, Nicole Butler, Vanessa Steinmetz, Karen Tsang, Jamie Brown, Stephanie Fast, Amber-Sekowan Daniels, Zoe Leigh Hopkins, Karen Hill, Lori Lozinski; Late Bloomer — Laszlo Barna, Nicole Butler, Vanessa Steinmetz, Jasmeet Raina, Baljinder (Ricky) Dhawan, Shebli Zarghami, Lakna Edirisinghe, Robbie David; The Office Movers — Dan Bennett, Shane Corkery, Anton Leo, Jermaine Richards, Trevaunn Richards, Clara Altimas, Robbie David; One More Time — Dan Bennett, Shane Corkery, Anton Leo, D.J. Demers, Jessie Gabe, Dane Clark, Melanie Orr, Colin Brunton
Animated program or series	Pre-School Program or Series
Wild Kratts; Camp Snoopy; Rubble & Crew; Snoopy Presents: Welcome Home, Franklin; Unicorn Academy	Paw Patrol — Jennifer Dodge, Ronnen Harary, Keith Chapman, Ursula Ziegler-Sullivan, Laura Clunie, Toni Stevens, Dan Mokriy, David Watson, Matt Beatty, Jason McKenzie; Builder Brothers Dream Factory — Matthew J.R. Bishop, Josie Crimi, Carla de Jong, J.J. Johnson, Scott Kraft, Megan Laughton, Amory Millard, Blair Powers, Jonathan Scott, Drew Scott; CBC Kids Celebrates the Olympic Games — Lisa Wisniewski, Andrew Hicks, Gagan Sagoo, Carly Watt, Emily Houghton; The Fabulous Show with Fay and Fluffy — Rennata Lopez, Georgina Lopez, Chloe Gray; Wordsville — Matthew J.R. Bishop, J.J. Johnson, Blair Powers, Christin Simms, Stephen J. Turnbull, Kirsten Hurd, Jill Peters, Sandra Sheppard
Children's or youth fiction	Children's or youth non-fiction
Beyond Black Beauty; Gangnam Project; Geek Girl; Odd Squad UK; Popularity Papers	Indigenous Art Adventures; All-Round Champion; Media Stamped; Old Enough!; Sunny's Quest
TV Movie	History Documentary Program or Series
Wynonna Earp: Vengeance — Emily Andras, Jordy Randall, Tom Cox, Brett Burlock, Sonia Hosko, Paolo Barzman, Jess Maldaner; Boot Camp — Todd Berger, Julie Di Cresce, Lindsay Macadam, Gilles Laplante, Sabrina Spence, Jennifer Chen, Wendy McKernan, David Way, Aron Levitz, David Madden, Lindsay Weems Ramey; Buying Back My Daughter — Charles Cooper, Orly Adelson, Meagan Good, Allen Lewis, James Jope; Lowlifes — Charles Cooper, James Mattagne, Brad Luff, Eric Carnagey, Roger Lay Jr., Michael Shepard, Jon Kaplan, Allen Lewis, Patrick Tozer; 'Twas the Date Before Christmas — Jeff Vanderwal, Sherri Rufh, J.C. Mills	Paid in Full: The Battle for Black Music; Atomic Reaction; Believe; The Knowing; The Passionate Eye: "Searching for Satoshi: The Mysterious Disappearance of the Bitcoin Creator"
Documentary program	Factual series
It's Not Funny Anymore: Vice to Proud Boys; Nobody Wants to Talk About Jacob Appelbaum; The Passionate Eye: "My Brother, Soleiman"; Saving the Animals of Ukraine; Words Left Unspoken	Who Owns the World; In Cold Water: The Shelter Bay Mystery; Little Big Community; PD True; Who Killed WCW?
Biography or Arts Documentary Program or Series	Lifestyle Program or Series
The Tragically Hip: No Dress Rehearsal; Absolutely Canadian; "Women of This Land"; eTalk: "The Devery Jacobs Interview"; Leonard Cohen: If It Be Your Will; The National: "Céline Dion: I Will Sing Again"	Mary Makes It Easy; Chuck and the First Peoples Kitchen; Evolving Vegan; Immigrant Kitchen: "Lumpia"; Wild Rose Vets
Reality/Competition Program or Series	Live entertainment special
Canada's Drag Race — Trevor Boris, Yette Vandendam, Betty Orr, Laura Michalchyshyn, Michael Kot, Justin Stockman, Fenton Bailey, Randy Barbato, Tom Campbell, RuPaul Charles, Spencer Fritz, Brett Ashley, Tomás Maturana; Canada's Ultimate Challenge — Erin Brock, John Brunton, Phil Gurin, Mark Lysakowski, Jeff Thrasher, Robyn Bigue, Chris Carter, Liam Colle, Ken Katibak, Lauren McCuaig, Catherine Petersen, Jesse Storey, Rose Marra; Dragons' Den — Molly Middleton, Amy Bourne; The Great Canadian Pottery Throw Down — Jamie Brown, Stephanie Fast, Seth Rogen, Evan Goldberg, James Weaver, Alex McAtee; Top Chef Canada — John Brunton, Mark Lysakowski, Eric Abboud, Jessica Brunton, Daniel Klimitz, Deanne Marsh, Mark Holland, Anthony Matkovic	Juno Awards of 2024; 2023 Scotiabank Giller Prize; eTalk After the Oscars; The Legacy Awards 2024
Science or Nature Documentary Program or Series (Rob Stewart Award)	Social/Political Documentary Program (Donald Brittain Award)
An Optimist's Guide to the Planet — Nikolaj Coster-Waldau, Philip Clarke, Jennifer Baichwal, Nicholas de Pencier, David W. Brady, Kate Harrison Karman, Joe Derrick, Patrick Cameron; All Too Clear: Beneath the Surface of the Great Lakes — Yvonne Drebert; The Nature of Things: "Jawsome: Canada's Great White Sharks" — Sonya Lee, Chelsea Turner, Jeff Turner; The Nature of Things: "Love Hurts: The Science of Heartbreak" — Nabil Mehchi, Frank Fiorito; The Nature of Things: "Plastic People: The Hidden Crisis of Microplastics" — Peter Raymont, Stephen Paniccia, Vanessa Dylyn, Rick Smith, Steve Ord	The Fifth Estate: "Contract to Kill" — Raj Ahluwalia, Allya Davidson; Against All Odds: The Unstoppable Story of Toronto’s Mount Sinai Hospital — Mark Selby, Barry Avrich; APTN Investigates: "Food for Profit" — Tom Fennario, Brittany Guyot, Paul Barnsley, Allya Davidson, Ivan Angelovski, Steven D'Souza, Lisa Ellenwood, Linda Guerriero; S-yéwyáw: Awaken — Ecko Aleck, Liz Marshall, Alfonso Salinas, Charlene SanJenko; An Unfinished Journey — Nadine Pequeneza, Charlotte Uzu
Sketch comedy program or series	Comedy special
This Hour Has 22 Minutes; Abroad; Roast Battle Canada; The Squeaky Wheel: Canada	Mae Martin: The Gala; The Dessert Presents St. Bulge's Day; Halifax Comedy Festival 2022; Winnipeg Comedy Festival: The Root of All Evil
Variety or entertainment special
eTalk Presents: Deadpool & Wolverine — Tyrone Edwards, Manny Groneveldt, Beth Maher, Steve Jarman, Ryan Thompson, Jennifer McLarty, Angela Holmes; Canada’s Walk of Fame 25th Anniversary Celebration — Jeffrey Latimer, Jocelyn Flanagan, Jessica Capobianco; Dragons’ Den: The After Effect — Tracie Tighe, Molly Middleton, Amy Bourne; The Last Timbit: A 60th Anniversary Musical — Claudia Abate, Manny Groneveldt, Brittany Prince-Cox, Michael Rubinoff, Sean O'Neill, Rami Azer

=== Actors ===
Lead performance, drama	Supporting performance, drama
Supinder Wraich, Allegiance; Vinessa Antoine, Plan B; Grace Dove, Bones of Crows; Hélène Joy, Murdoch Mysteries; Michelle Morgan, Heartland; Kathleen Munroe, Law & Order Toronto: Criminal Intent; Mayko Nguyen, Hudson & Rex; Aden Young, Law & Order Toronto: Criminal Intent	Enrico Colantoni, Allegiance; Sarah Booth, Plan B; Kevin Hanchard, Hudson & Rex; Jonny Harris, Murdoch Mysteries; Karen Knox, Wynonna Earp: Vengeance; Daniel Maslany, Murdoch Mysteries; Clare McConnell, Murdoch Mysteries; Karen Robinson, Law & Order Toronto: Criminal Intent
Lead performance, comedy	Supporting performance, comedy
Andrew Phung, Run the Burbs; Aaron Abrams, Children Ruin Everything; Dan Beirne, One More Time; D.J. Demers, One More Time; Rakhee Morzaria, Run the Burbs; Anastasia Phillips, The Trades; Meaghan Rath, Children Ruin Everything; Mary Walsh, The Missus Downstairs	Ennis Esmer, Children Ruin Everything; Raoul Bhaneja, The Trades; Lisa Codrington, Children Ruin Everything; Maddy Foley, One More Time; Jonathan Langdon, Run the Burbs; Julie Nolke, Run the Burbs; Patrick McKenna, 1 Man's Treasure; Zoriah Wong, Run the Burbs
Performance in a guest role in a comedy series	Performance in a guest role in a drama series
Rodrigo Fernandez-Stoll, Son of a Critch; Kathryn Greenwood, 1 Man's Treasure; Paul Sun-Hyung Lee, 1 Man's Treasure; Marito Lopez, One More Time; Patrick McKenna, The Trades; Nicole Power, Run the Burbs; Kimberly-Ann Truong, Run the Burbs; Connie Wang, One More Time	Jayne Eastwood, Sullivan's Crossing; Blessing Adedijo, Law & Order Toronto: Criminal Intent; Amanda Brugel, Law & Order Toronto: Criminal Intent; Colm Feore, Murdoch Mysteries; Peter Keleghan, Murdoch Mysteries; Sydney Meyer, Law & Order Toronto: Criminal Intent; Veena Sood, Allegiance; Karine Vanasse, Bones of Crows
Ensemble performance in a comedy series	Ensemble performance in a variety or sketch comedy series
Children Ruin Everything — Meaghan Rath, Aaron Abrams, Logan Nicholson, Mikayla SwamiNathan, Ennis Esmer, Nazneen Contractor, Veena Sood, Dmitry Chepovetsky, Lisa Codrington; Letterkenny — Jared Keeso, Nathan Dales, Michelle Mylett, K. Trevor Wilson, Dylan Playfair, Andrew Herr, Tyler Johnston, Evan Stern, Jacob Tierney, Dan Petronijevic, Mark Forward, Lisa Codrington, Kamilla Kowal, Kaniehtiio Horn; One More Time — D.J. Demers, Geri Hall, Elise Bauman, Dan Beirne, Seran Sathiyaseelan, Dayton Sinkia, Maddy Foley; Run the Burbs — Andrew Phung, Rakhee Morzaria, Zoriah Wong, Roman Pesino, Ali Hassan, Julie Nolke, Chris Locke, Kimberly-Ann Truong; The Trades — Robb Wells, Anastasia Phillips, Jennifer Spence, Dan Petronijevic, Raoul Bhaneja, Enrico Colantoni, Jesse Camacho, Brandon Oakes, Susan Kent, Jason Daley, Patrick McKenna	This Hour Has 22 Minutes — Mark Critch, Trent McClellan, Aba Amuquandoh, Stacey McGunnigle, Chris Wilson; Abroad — Isabel Kanaan, Joy Castro, Justin Santiago, Nicco Lorenzo Garcia, Aldrin Bundoc; Roast Battle Canada — Ennis Esmer, Russell Peters, Sabrina Jalees, K. Trevor Wilson, Hisham Kelati, Mark Little, Marito Lopez, Sophie Buddle; The Squeaky Wheel: Canada — Gaitrie Persaud, Graham Kent, Margaret Rose, Samantha Wyss, Sivert Das, Wesley Magee-Saxton, Yousef Kadoura, Courtney Gilmour
Lead performance in a children's or youth program or series	Supporting performance in a children's or youth program or series
Veronika Slowikowska, Davey and Jonesie's Locker; Mia Bella, Popularity Papers; Jaelynn Thora Brooks, Davey and Jonesie's Locker; Mia SwamiNathan, Wordsville; Zoe Wiesenthal, Ruby and the Well	Josette Jorge, Ruby and the Well; Lisa Berry, Beyond Black Beauty; Akiel Julien, Beyond Black Beauty; Michela Luci, Dino Dex
Performance in a television film or miniseries	Voice performance
Melanie Scrofano, Wynonna Earp: Vengeance; Rachel Boudwin, Boot Camp; Mackenzie Cardwell, Amish Affair; Charlot Daysh, Cry of Silence; Riele Downs, Abducted Off the Street: The Carlesha Gaither Story; Amanda Fix, Lowlifes; Amy Groening, 'Twas the Date Before Christmas; Joanne Jansen, The Manny	Kayla Lorette, Doomlands; Cory Doran, Rubble & Crew; Sara Garcia, Unicorn Academy; Joshua Graham, Open Season: Call of Nature; Josette Jorge, Open Season: Call of Nature; Ron Pardo, Paw Patrol; Patty Sullivan, Mittens & Pants; Samantha Weinstein, Mittens & Pants

=== News and information ===
National newscast	Local newscast
CTV National News; CBC News: The National; Global National	Global BC News Hour; CBC News Ottawa at 6; CityNews Toronto; CTV News Toronto at 6; CTV News Vancouver at 6
News anchor, national	News anchor, local
Adrienne Arsenault; Dawna Friesen; Omar Sachedina	Chris Gailus and Sophie Lui, Global BC News Hour; Debra Arbec, CTV News Montreal at 6; Dan Burritt, CBC News Vancouver at 6; Meghan Roberts, CBC News: Northbeat
National reporter	Local reporter
Jeff Semple, Global National; Chris Brown, CBC News: The National; Thomas Daigle, CBC News: The National; Adrian Ghobrial, CTV National News	Jackie McKay, CBC Indigenous; Alana Cole, CBC Manitoba News at 6; Brady Strachan, CBC News Vancouver at 6; Pat Taney, CityNews Toronto
News or information series	News or information program
The Fifth Estate; APTN Investigates; Maamuitaau; Marketplace	W5: "Narco Jungle: The Darien Gap"; CBC News: The National: "Gaza Aid Mission"; Global News: "Surviving Edmonton"; The New Reality: "The Business of Indigenous Kids in Care"
News or information segment	Live news special
CBC News Ottawa at 6: "Priority Purple: Overdose in Progress"; APTN Investigates: "Beyond the Strip"; CBC News: "Testing the Truth"; CBC News: The National: "Hunting Stolen cars in Ghana"	CTV News: The Right Honourable Brian Mulroney: A Life Remembered; CBC News Manitoba, "Manitoba Votes 2023"; CBC News: D-Day: 80 Years; Global News Manitoba, "Decision Manitoba 2023"
Talk or entertainment news series	Political news program or series
The Good Stuff with Mary Berg; CP24 Breakfast; eTalk; The Social	Question Period; Power & Politics; Rosemary Barton Live; Unrigged
Host or interviewer, news or information program or series	Host, talk show or entertainment news
Avery Haines, W5: "Narco Jungle: The Darien Gap"; Julian Black Antelope, Secret History: Women Warriors; David Cochrane, Power & Politics; Kenneth Jackson, APTN Investigates: "Secrets of the Bay"; Carolyn Jarvis, The New Reality: "The Business of Indigenous Kids in Care"	Melissa Grelo, Cynthia Loyst, Andrea Bain and Jessica Allen, The Social; Mary Berg, The Good Stuff with Mary Berg; Jeff McArthur, Carolyn Mackenzie and Morgan Hoffman, The Morning Show
Host, live entertainment special	Host in a variety, lifestyle, reality/competition, or talk program or series
Nelly Furtado, Juno Awards of 2024; Tyrone Edwards, Elaine Lui and Traci Melchor, eTalk After the Oscars; Adrian Holmes, The Legacy Awards 2024; Rick Mercer, 2023 Scotiabank Giller Prize	Brooke Lynn Hytes, Brad Goreski and Traci Melchor, Canada's Drag Race; Jonny Harris, Still Standing; Colin Mochrie, Old Enough!; Amanda Parris, For the Culture with Amanda Parris; Nicole Stamp, Media Stamped
Host, lifestyle
Mary Berg, Mary Makes It Easy; Ali Hassan, Immigrant Kitchen; Chuck Hughes, Chuck and the First Peoples Kitchen; Mena Massoud, Evolving Vegan; Jonathan Scott and Drew Scott, Don't Hate Your House with the Property Brothers

=== Sports ===
Live sporting event	Sports analyst
2024 Stanley Cup Final: Game 7; 110th Grey Cup; 2023 PWHL Draft; 2024 IIHF Women's World Championship	Kevin Bieksa, Hockey Night in Canada; Steven Caldwell, UEFA Euro 2024; Craig McMorris, 2024 Summer Olympics; Luke Willson, SC with Jay Onrait; Craig Simpson, 2024 Stanley Cup Final
Sports host	Sports play-by-play
James Duthie, 2024 Copa América; Anastasia Bucsis, 2024 Summer Olympics; Bryan Hayes, OverDrive; Ron MacLean, Hockey Day in Canada; Andi Petrillo, 2024 Summer Olympics	Mark Lee, 2024 Summer Olympics; Chris Cuthbert, 2024 Stanley Cup Final; Alexandre Despatie, 2024 Summer Olympics; Luke Wileman, 2024 Copa América
Sports feature segment	Sports opening
"Just Us" (TSN) — Matthew Dorman, David Naylor, Darren Oliver, James Judges, David Midgley; "72" (TSN) — Matthew Dorman, James Duthie, Darren Oliver, Rich Liani, Michael Banani, Devon Burns; "Just Keep Fighting: The Brady Leavold Story" (Sportsnet) — Michael Adach, Mark Wade, Zac Laszuk; "Mama Nat" (Sportsnet) — Donnovan Bennett, Heath Fashina, David Zelikovitz, Christine Mayall, Tony Law, Carla Antonio; "Olympic Reflections with Donnovan Bennett" (CBC) — Donnovan Bennett, Tim Thompson, Jeff Shelegy, Sherali Najak	2024 Copa América (TSN) — Simon Garan, Jacob Frenkel, Devon Burns, Steve Denheyer; 2024 Calgary Stampede Chuckwagon Open (Sportsnet) — Michael Little, Cindy Gillies, Steve Katakami, Georgiy Besedin, Todd Kimberley; 2024 Stanley Cup Finals: In the Air (TSN) — Brian Spear, Phil Rzentkowski, Carson Illidge, Ryan Tonellato, Kevin Fallis, Ron MacLean; 2024 Summer Olympics: The Gold Within (CBC) — Phylicia George, Randell Adjei, Dallas Soonias, Tim Thompson, Jemeni Gairy, Sherali Najak, Sadaf Khajeh, Sage Ziaee; TradeCentre (TSN) — Michael Lane, Matthew Cade, Jacob Frenkel, Bruce Boudreau, James Judges, Ian Morris
Sports program or series	Technical production in a live sports event
2024 Copa América; 2024 Summer Olympics; Breaking Down Barriers; NHL Draft from the Sphere	2024 Stanley Cup Final: Game 7 — Murray Corbett, John Cuccaro, Myriam Dickner, Alex Harwood, Caitlind Lusty, Corey Saunders, Marc-Andre Lalonde, Larry MacDonald, Wil Enright, Brian Burnett, John Einarson, Adam Kruspe, Jeff Snider, Mike Brown, Austin Munday, Gaby Almeida, John Gourley, John Augi, Stephen Hanbury, Craig Hennessy, Kevin Schnurr, Stephen Oldfield, Carl Rousseau, Kristyn Taras, Liam Gerrie; 110th Grey Cup — Chris Bell, Shawn Taylor; 2024 Summer Olympics — Joel Perron, Dave Allmark, Mike Alderson, Roberto Capretta, T.J. Heideman

=== Craft awards ===
Editorial research	Visual research
Courtney Miceli, Kalin Moon and Jacob Akman, The Tragically Hip: No Dress Rehearsal: "Part Three: It's a Good Life if You Don't Weaken"; C. Hudson Hwang, Lewis Gordon and Paul Kemp, The Passionate Eye: "Searching for Satoshi: The Mysterious Disappearance of the Bitcoin Creator"; Amanda Parris, Saman Malik, Yasmine Mathurin, Sara Yacobi-Harris, Christine Charles and Christine Jean-Baptiste, For the Culture with Amanda Parris: "The Glass Cliff"; Susan Schafer, We're All Gonna Die (Even Jay Baruchel): "Jay-I"; Tanya Talaga, Jordan Huffman, Dan McFarlane, Beverly Andrews and James Miller, The Knowing: "Stealing Children"	Elspeth Domville and David Wells, The Tragically Hip: No Dress Rehearsal: "Part Two: On the Verge"; Joel Elliot, Melissa James, Paul Kemp and Lewis Gordon, The Passionate Eye: "Searching for Satoshi: The Mysterious Disappearance of the Bitcoin Creator"; Maggie McCaw, We're All Gonna Die (Even Jay Baruchel): "Jay-I"; Tanya Talaga, Laura Blaney, Jordan Huffman, Beverly Andrews, James Miller and Elspeth Domville, The Knowing: "Stealing Children"; Thea Toole, Kyle Parry and Jon Boucher, Dark Side of the Ring: "The Life and Legends of Harley Race"
Make-Up	Hair
Viktor Peters, Canada's Drag Race: "Drags to Riches: The Musical"; Roxanne DeNobrega, Beyond Black Beauty: "This Used to Be My Playground"; Deb Drennan, Murdoch Mysteries: "Station House of Horrors"; Lynda McCormack, Law & Order Toronto: Criminal Intent: "Three Points"; Elizabeth McLeod and Darci Jackson, Bones of Crows: "To Be Denied"	Kirsten Klontz, Canada's Drag Race: "A Star Is Born"; Shirley Bond, Murdoch Mysteries: "Bottom of the Barrel"; Renee Chan, Davey and Jonesie's Locker: "Beyond Hunger Dome"; Charlene Dunn, Bones of Crows: "To Be Here"; Lydia Pensa, Law & Order Toronto: Criminal Intent: "The Key to the Castle"
Costume design	Visual effects
Joanna Syrokomla, Murdoch Mysteries: "Why Is Everybody Singing?"; Zena Fares, Late Bloomer: "The Rokha"; Nicole Manek, Davey and Jonesie's Locker: "Beyond Hunger Dome"; Nicole Manek, Law & Order Toronto: Criminal Intent: "The Key to the Castle"; Carmen Thompson and Jessica Kalan, Bones of Crows: "To Be Here"	Matt Hansen, Darcy Arthurs, Colin Campbell, Lorne Kwechansky, Ken Nielsen, Michael Key, Paula Fania, Jenny Lim, Chad Cutler and Ingyun Hwang, Wynonna Earp: Vengeance; Adam Beck, Terry Bradley, Jake Fullerton, Nial McFadyen, Kelly Milton, Brian Smeets, Ryan Smith, Susan Sullivan, Pedro Vilas and James Wallace, Dino Dex: "Dino Deep End"; Eric Gambini, Gillian Pearson and Sarah Krusch, Bones of Crows: "To Be Starved"; Sophia Jooyeon Lee, Brian Huynh, Steven Huynh, Justin Perreault and Michael Davidson, Davey and Jonesie's Locker: "There's No Place Like Homeostasis"; Mike Sevigny, The Trades: "Medhi Is Partied Out"
Production design/art direction in a fiction program or series	Production design/art direction in a non-fiction program or series
Trevor Smith, Joel Tobman and Amber Humphries, Wynonna Earp: Vengeance; Ingrid Jurek, M-A Orenstein and Brad Greaves, Run the Burbs: "Phright Night"; Oleg Savytski, Law & Order Toronto: Criminal Intent: "Cul-de-Sac"; Bob Sher, Murdoch Mysteries: "Train to Nowhere"; Ciara Vernon, Late Bloomer: "Nudes"	Andrew Kinsella and Tara Smith, Canada's Drag Race: "Premiere Ball"; Andrew Kinsella and Tara Smith, Canada's Drag Race: Canada vs. the World: "The Hole"; Alex Nadon, Juno Awards of 2024; Michael “Spike” Parks and Mike Gelinas, The Great Canadian Baking Show: "Holiday Special"; Theresa Warburton, Alex Nadon and Frydun Mehrzad, 2024 Summer Olympics
Casting, Fiction	Casting, Non-Fiction
Larissa Mair and Colleen Rush, Late Bloomer; Sharon Forrest, Law & Order Toronto: Criminal Intent; Jenny Lewis and Sara Kay, Letterkenny; Jenny Lewis and Sara Kay, Shoresy; Larissa Mair and Colleen Rush, Davey and Jonesie's Locker	Heather Muir, Canada's Drag Race; Lauren McCuaig, Tanner Sawatzky and Jesse Storey, The Amazing Race Canada; Heather Muir, The Traitors Canada; Josh Tavares, Josh Gawreletz and Amy Rosen, Top Chef Canada; Meredith Veats, The Great Canadian Baking Show

=== Photography ===
Photography in a comedy series	Photography in a documentary program or factual series
Gayle Ye, Late Bloomer: "Nudes"; Lainie Knox, Children Ruin Everything: "Talking"; Ben Lichty, Don't Even: "Jerk Sandwich"; Jason Tan, Son of a Critch: "Go Into the Light"; Ann Tipper, Run the Burbs: "Phright Night"	Chris Romeike, The Tragically Hip: No Dress Rehearsal: "Part Two: On the Verge"; Shady Hanna and Tess Girard, Swan Song: "Opening Night"; Zachary Melnick, All Too Clear: Beneath the Surface of the Great Lakes: "The Last Whitefish?"; Ken Ng, Born Hungry; John Minh Tran, An Optimist's Guide to the Planet: "Dusk or Dawn"
Photography in a drama program or series	Photography in a lifestyle or reality program or series
Amy Belling, Beyond Black Beauty: "If You Love Me"; Rion Gonzales, Abducted Off the Street: The Carlesha Gaither Story; David Greene, Law & Order Toronto: Criminal Intent: "The Key to the Castle"; Ronald Plante, So Long, Marianne: "So Long, Leonard"; Jonathan Yapp, A Not So Royal Christmas	Ryan Shaw, The Amazing Race Canada: "Caution Double Pass Ahead"; Adam Gladstone, The Great Canadian Baking Show: "Holiday Special"; Claudio Manni, Property Virgins; Joey Sadler, Canada's Drag Race: Canada vs. the World: "Snatch Game: The Rusical"; Kevin C. W. Wong, Mary Makes It Easy: "Movie Night"
Photography in a news or information program, series or segment
Jonathan Castell, The Fifth Estate: "Surviving the Circle"; Simon Charland, APTN Investigates: "Lost Spirit"; Trevor Lyons and Jaison Empson, CBC News: "Manitoba Votes 2023"; Jerry Vienneau, W5: "Narco Jungle: The Darien Gap"

=== Editing ===
Editing in a children's or youth program or series	Editing in a comedy program or series
Shelley Therrien, Geek Girl: "Chapter 6"; Marc Fourreau, All-Round Champion: "Pickleball"; Emily Gilhooly, Media Stamped: "Screen Time Is Yummy"; Andrea Novoa and Craig Anderson, The Fabulous Show with Fay and Fluffy: "I Love My Name!"; Morgan Waters, Davey and Jonesie's Locker: "You Don't Belong Here"	Baun Mah, Late Bloomer: "The Turban"; Pauline DeCroix, Son of a Critch: "Go Into the Light"; Baun Mah, Run the Burbs: "Phright Night"; Kyle Martin, Letterkenny: "Live at MoDean's"; Gloria Tong, Don't Even: "Stinky and the Man's Battle of the Bands 1998"
Editing in a documentary program or series	Editing in a drama program or series
Peter Denes, The Tragically Hip: No Dress Rehearsal: "Part Two: On the Verge"; Cathy Gulkin, Nuked; Ryan Monteith, The Passionate Eye: "Harder Better Faster Stronger"; Ania Smolenskaia, The Nature of Things: "Plastic People: The Hidden Crisis of Microplastics"; Ken Yan, Hairy Tales	Maxime Lahaie, Greg Ng and Roderick Deogrades, Bones of Crows: "To Be Separated"; Véronique Barbe, So Long, Marianne: "The Chelsea Hotel"; Wendy Hallam Martin, Law & Order Toronto: Criminal Intent: "The Key to the Castle"; John Nicholls, Law & Order Toronto: Criminal Intent: "The Minnow and the Shark"; Gillian Truster, Sight Unseen: "Tess"
Editing in a factual program or series	Editing in a reality or competition program or series
Marc Ricciardelli and Jason Cook, Dark Side of the Ring: "The Ballad of 'Earthquake' John Tenta"; J Deschamps, Chris DeKoning, Chris Donaldson, Clare Elson, Clark Masters and Rob Ruzic, House of Ali: "A Jersey Shore Moment"; Clare Elson, Mary Makes It Easy: "Tastes of Tuscany"; Jessica Graore, Mary Makes It Easy: "Movie Night"; Andrew King, Bollywed: "Opening Jitters"	Peter Antonakos, Kailey Birk, Eliana Borsa, Megan Day, Jonathan Dowler, Michael Emberley, Wesley Finucan, Ellora Dela Fuente, Jessica Graore, Andrew Gurney, Alexandra Mastronardi, Al Manson, Jeff Perry, Lindsay Ragone, Keith Ross, Mike Scott, Jon White, Jordan Wood, Holly Benson, Emily Gilhooley, Nathara Imenes, Alex Marsolais-Whicher, Heather Skeoch and Adam Sousa, Big Brother Canada: "Episode 18"; Elianna Borsa, Dan Cable, Jenny Reed, Mike Scott and Andrew Gurney, Top Chef Canada: "The Feast of Toronto"; Daniel Cable, Pat Fairbairn, Alexandra Mastronardi, Curtis Rogers and Olivia Shin, Best in Miniature: "Take It Outside"; Allan Hughes and Ellora Dela Fuente, The Great Canadian Baking Show: "Finale"; Al Manson, Elianna Borsa, Dan Cable, Frange Cruces, Ellora Dela Fuente, Chris Donaldson, Jonathan Dowler, Andrew Gurney, Vish Hansa, Chelsea Nyomi, Jeff Perry, Jenny Reed, Curtis Rogers, Keisha Rose, Jaime Sanchez, Heather Skeoch, Stephen Watt and Jon Wong, Canada's Ultimate Challenge: "The Handshake"

=== Sound ===
Sound in a fiction program or series	Sound in a documentary or factual program or series
Martin Lee, Ella Melanson, Martin Gwynn Jones, Rob Warchol, Joe Mancuso, Zenon Waschuk and John Elliot, Law & Order Toronto: Criminal Intent: "The Sound of Silence"; Igor Bezuglov, Cailey Milito, Brandon Bak, Sean Karp, Justin Helle and Patrick Lefler, Dino Dex: "Chickenosaurus Rex, Part 2"; Brian Eimer, Michael Bonini, Sergei Kupriianov, Josh Pichardo and Jordan Cutler, Abducted Off the Street: The Carlesha Gaither Story; Mike Markiw, Robert “Arjay” Joly, Ethan Lentz, Matthew Hussey, Janice Ierulli, Dave Johnson, Mark Shnuriwsky, Sue Fawcett, Kevin Banks, John Elliot, Mike Woroniuk and Paul Shubat, Wynonna Earp: Vengeance; Miguel Nunes, Craig Berkey and Gregor Phillips, Bones of Crows: "To Let Go"	Jason Perreira, Robert Sinko and Sanjay Mehta, The Tragically Hip: No Dress Rehearsal: "Part Two: On the Verge"; Michael Bonini, Brian Eimer and Dylan Broda, An Optimist's Guide to the Planet: "Shelter"; Michelle Irving, Nick Davey, Drew Snyder and Julian Ardial Ramirez, We're All Gonna Die (Even Jay Baruchel): "Jay-I"; Sam Rodgers, James Lazarenko, Claire Dobson, Stefana Fratila, Paul Germann, Jane Tattersall and Graham Rogers, Swan Song: "Opening Night"; Richard Spence-Thomas and Gary Vaughan, Born Hungry
Sound in a lifestyle, reality or entertainment program or series	Sound in an animated program or series
John Diemer, Scott Brachmayer, Rosie Eberhard, Levi Linton, Dane Kelly, Rob Taylor, Eric Leigh and Alastair Sims, Canada's Drag Race: Canada vs. the World: "Snatch Game: The Rusical"; John Diemer, Scott Brachmayer, Rosie Eberhard, Levi Linton, Rob Taylor, Eric Leigh and Alastair Sims, Canada's Drag Race: "Premiere Ball"; Brian Eimer, Les Stroud's Wild Harvest: "Banana Flower"; Mark Krupka, Luke McClean, Brian Gallant, Lisa Metin and Jordan Guy, The Amazing Race Canada: "Bark If You See 'Em"; Mark Vreeken, Charles-Émile Beaudin, Doug McClement and Jeff Kozak, Juno Awards of 2024	Richard Spence-Thomas, Tim Muirhead, Anita Yung, Madelyn Southward, Kyle Peters, Katie Pagacz, Bethany Masters, Patton Rodrigues and Mitch Connors, Paw Patrol: "Rescue Wheels: Pups Save Adventure Bay!"; Rob Andres and Stephen Mullett, Open Season: Call of Nature: "Radio Wild"; Richard Spence-Thomas, Tim Muirhead, Kyle Peters, Bethany Masters, Luke Dante and Patton Rodrigues, Rubble & Crew: "The Crew Builds a Ballpark"; Tyler Tsang, Ethan Myers, Julian Rudd, Art Mullin, Drew Snyder, Levi Considine, Kevin Chamberlain, Chris Battaglia and Ryan Chalmers, Unicorn Academy: "Under the Fairy Moon"

=== Directing ===
Animation	Children's or youth
Mélanie Daigle, Camp Snoopy: "Sally's Tooth"; Louis Champagne and Martin Kratt, Wild Kratts: "Our Blue and Green World, Part 1"; John Lei, Dino Ranch: "Sticking Together"; Joey So and Diana Basso, Rubble & Crew: "The Crew Builds a Ballpark"; Heejung Yun, Rosie's Rules: "The Jalapeño Giant"	Alicia K. Harris, Beyond Black Beauty: "The Promise of a New Day"; Romeo Candido, Gangnam Project: "Pilot"; J. J. Johnson, Dino Dex: "Chickenosaurus Rex"; Allison Johnston, Davey and Jonesie's Locker: "You Don't Belong Here"; Graeme Lynch, All-Round Champion: "Arcathlon"
Comedy	Documentary program
Jacob Tierney, Letterkenny: "Over and Out"; Kelly Fyffe-Marshall, Children Ruin Everything: "Spontaneity"; Zoe Leigh Hopkins, Don't Even: "Jerk Sandwich"; Peter Huang, Late Bloomer: "Nudes"; Melanie Orr, Children Ruin Everything: "Confidence"	Ben Addelman and Ziya Tong, The Nature of Things: "Plastic People: The Hidden Crisis of Microplastics"; Josiane Blanc, Words Left Unspoken; Jamie Kastner, Nobody Wants to Talk About Jacob Appelbaum; Paul Kemp, The Passionate Eye: "Searching for Satoshi: The Mysterious Disappearance of the Bitcoin Creator"; Anton Ptushkin, Saving the Animals of Ukraine
Documentary series	Drama series
Mike Downie, The Tragically Hip: No Dress Rehearsal: "Part 4: Grace, Too"; Alison Duke, Paid in Full: The Battle for Black Music: "Episode 3"; Michelle Mama, The Nature of Things: "Fluid: Life Beyond the Binary"; Chelsea McMullan, Swan Song: "Opening Night"; Tanya Talaga and Courtney Montour, The Knowing: "Stealing Children"	Marie Clements, Bones of Crows: "To Be Here"; Holly Dale, Law & Order Toronto: Criminal Intent: "Three Points"; Bronwen Hughes, So Long, Marianne: "The Chelsea Hotel"; Sharon Lewis, Law & Order Toronto: Criminal Intent: "Cul-de-Sac"; Nimisha Mukerji, Allegiance: "Safe Harbours"
Factual	Lifestyle and information
Amanda Parris and Saman Malik, For the Culture with Amanda Parris: "Diaspora Wars"; Jay Baruchel, We're All Gonna Die (Even Jay Baruchel): "Jay-I"; Sebastian Cluer, Bollywed: "Opening Jitters"; Darrell Faria, Still Standing: "Dawson City, YT"; Daniel Oron, Cursed Histories: "120 Days of Sodom, The Iceman's Curse, City of Screams"	Gillian E. Parker, The Social: "Earth Day Special"; John Keffer, The Good Stuff with Mary Berg: "The Good Feast: Holiday Edition"; Jan McCharles, Mary Makes It Easy: "Movie Night"; Jorge Requena Ramos, Immigrant Kitchen: "Lumpia"; Catherine Swing and Sebastian Cluer, Styled: "Paid Off, Styled Up"
Live sporting event	Reality or competition program or series
Dawn Landis, 2024 IIHF Women's World Championship; Mike Alderson, 2023 PWHL Draft; Andy Bouyoukos, 110th Grey Cup; John Szpala, 2024 Stanley Cup Final: "Game 7"	Shelagh O'Brien, Canada's Drag Race: "Premiere Ball"; Mike Bickerton, Blown Away: "Star Power"; Darrell Faria, The Great Canadian Pottery Throw Down: "Into the Fire (Raku)"; Shelagh O'Brien, Canada's Drag Race: Canada vs. the World: "Snatch Game: The Rusical"; Dave Russell, Big Brother Canada: "Episode 1"
TV Movie	Variety or sketch comedy program or series
Katie Boland, Abducted Off the Street: The Carlesha Gaither Story; Barry Avrich, Much Ado About Nothing; Stefan Brogren, Obsessed to Death; Alpha Nicky Mulowa, Rush for Your Life; Stefan Scaini, Love on the Right Course	Jocelyn Corkum and Darrell Faria, This Hour Has 22 Minutes: "Moose Gone Wild"; Kara Harun, Abroad: "Working Together"; Shelagh O'Brien, Mae Martin: The Gala; Shelagh O'Brien, Roast Battle Canada: "Hisham Kelati v Mark Little, Marito Lopez v Sophie Buddle"; Jane Wilson, 2023 Scotiabank Giller Prize

=== Music ===
Best Original Music, Animation	Best Original Music, Comedy
Graeme Cornies, Brian Pickett and James Chapple, Paw Patrol: "Rescue Wheels: Pups Save Adventure Bay!"; Graeme Cornies, Brian Pickett and James Chapple, Rubble & Crew: "The Crew Builds a Ballpark"; Ian LeFeuvre, Builder Brothers Dream Factory: "Great Adventure Rally"; Matt Ouimet, Let's Go, Bananas!: "Daddy Date Night"; Petteri Sainio, Rocket Club: "Solar Flare Friendships"	Nikhil Seetharam, Children Ruin Everything: "Talking"; Dillon Baldassero, Davey and Jonesie's Locker: "Beyond Hunger Dome"; Peter Chapman, One More Time: "The Smiley Face Bandit"; Jonathan Goldsmith, The Trades: "Sensitivity Training"; Brian Pickett, Graeme Cornies, James Chapple, Rachael Johnstone and Jason Turriff, Odd Squad UK: "Villain of the Year / Planes, Trains, and Oddmobiles"
Best Original Music, Drama	Best Original Music, Documentary
Robert Carli and Peter Chapman, Wynonna Earp: Vengeance; Lora Bidner and Robert Carli, Ruby and the Well: "I Wish I Knew Where It Was"; Caleb Chan and Brian Chan, Allegiance: "Pilot"; Rob Melamed and Ryan McLarnon, Mistletoe Murders: "Poison in a Pear Tree, Part 1"; Jesse Zubot and Wayne Lavallee, Bones of Crows: "To Be Separated"	Katie Stelmanis, Swan Song: "Queen Behaviour"; Bruce Cockburn, La Loche; Adrian Ellis and Walker Grimshaw, Believe: "Christianity"; Ben Fox, The Passionate Eye: "My Brother, Soleiman"; Tom Third, Nobody Wants to Talk About Jacob Appelbaum
Best Original Music, Factual, Lifestyle, Reality or Entertainment	Best Original Song
Orin Isaacs, CBC Sports: Paris 2024 Summer Olympics; Neil Haverty and Chris Reineck, Who Owns the World; Orin Isaacs, Big Brother Canada; Andrew Gordon Macpherson, Dark Side of the Ring; Andrew Gordon Macpherson, Who Killed WCW?	Gail Maurice, "Auntie's Honour Song" — Allegiance; Ross Nykiforuk, "Let's Go Chums" — Chums; Matt O'Halloran, "Neverending Lights" — The Next Step; Brendan Quinn and Ryan Chalmers, "Under the Fairy Moon" — Unicorn Academy; Mark Selby, "We've Got Talent" — Canada's Got Talent; Meiro Stamm and Antonio Naranjo, "We Are Dogs" — Mittens & Pants

=== Writing ===
Animated program or series	Children's or youth
Scott Montgomery, Robb Armstrong, Craig Schulz, Bryan Schulz and Cornelius Uliano, Snoopy Presents: Welcome Home, Franklin; Lindsey Addawoo, Xavier Riddle and the Secret Museum: "I Am Bessie Coleman"; Roger Bainbridge, Doomlands: "Please, My Jo-Jo"; Kyah Green, Open Season: Call of Nature: "Straight from the Horse's Mouth"; Josette Jorge, Galapagos X: "Water Games"	Kara Harun and Cheryl Meyer, Beyond Black Beauty: "Everybody Hurts"; Mark De Angelis, Odd Squad UK: "Odd Ones In Part I / Odd Ones In Part II"; JP Larocque and Vivian Lin, Popularity Papers: "Let's Sick Together"; Vivian Lin, Popularity Papers: "The Wonderful Wizard of Mapleview, Part 2"; Evany Rosen, Davey and Jonesie's Locker: "You Don't Belong Here"
Comedy series	Documentary
Jasmeet Raina, Late Bloomer: "Nudes"; Andrew De Angelis, Children Ruin Everything: "Hangovers"; Jessie Gabe, One More Time: "The New Deaf Girl"; Jennica Harper, Run the Burbs: "Phamily Doctor"; Kathleen Phillips, Children Ruin Everything: "Clothes"	Tanya Talaga and Courtney Montour, The Knowing; Barry Avrich, Born Hungry; Josiane Blanc, Words Left Unspoken; Jamie Kastner, Nobody Wants to Talk About Jacob Appelbaum; Chelsea McMullan and Sean O'Neill, Swan Song
Drama series	Factual
Tassie Cameron, Law & Order Toronto: Criminal Intent: "The Key to the Castle"; Anar Ali and Sarah Dodd, Allegiance: "Safe Harbour"; Marie Clements, Bones of Crows: "To Be Here"; Ken Cuperus, Mistletoe Murders: "Poison in a Pear Tree, Part 1"; Shazia Javed, Potluck Ladies: "Episode 1"	Stuart Henderson, Emma Kassirer and Kirk Ramsay, We're All Gonna Die (Even Jay Baruchel): "Jay-I"; Saxon de Cocq, Treaty Road: "Food Sovereignty"; Jonny Harris, Fraser Young, Graham Chittenden and Aisha Brown, Still Standing: "Dawson City, YT"; Colin McNeil, Guardians of the North: "Battle for Besnard"; Amanda Parris and Saman Malik, For the Culture with Amanda Parris
Lifestyle or reality/competition program or series	Preschool program or series
Brandon Ash-Mohammed, Trevor Boris and Spencer Fritz, Canada's Drag Race: "From Drags to Riches: The Rusical"; Brandon Ash-Mohammed, Trevor Boris and Spencer Fritz, Canada's Drag Race: Canada vs. the World: "Snatch Game: The Rusical"; Rob Brunner, Mark Lysakowski, Paulina Robak and Michael Tersigni, The Amazing Race Canada: "I Smell Like Carcass"; Nadine Djoury, The Great Canadian Baking Show: "Old School Week"; Carly Spencer, Blown Away: "The Dark Side"	Richard Young, Dino Ranch: "Sonny's T-Rex Turmoil"; Kanja Chen, The Fabulous Show with Fay and Fluffy: "I Can Tell the Truth"; Kanja Chen, Go Togo: "Long Bay's Work"; Nedda Sarshar, The Fabulous Show with Fay and Fluffy: "I Love My Body!"; Christin Simms and Meghan Reid, Wordsville: "The Case of the Rational Explanation"
Television film	Variety or sketch comedy program or series
Emily Andras, Wynonna Earp: Vengeance; Ramona Barckert, 'Twas the Date Before Christmas; Gemma Holdway, Boot Camp; Julie Kim and Kariné Marwood, Curious Caterer: Foiled Plans; Jessica Landry, Obsessed to Death	Jordan Foisy, Mark Critch, Jeremy Woodcock, Aisha Brown, Nigel Grinstead, Aba Amuquandoh, Chris Wilson, Travis Lindsay, Stacey McGunnigle, Ashley Botting, Dan Dillabough, Ajahnis Charley, Alan Shane Lewis, Maddy Kelly, Heather Mariko and Kyle Hickey, This Hour Has 22 Minutes: "Check This Out"; Ryan Belleville, Halifax Comedy Fest 2022; D.J. Demers, Ahren Belisle, Ryan LaChance, Courtney Gilmour and Tanyalee Davis, All Access Comedy; Isabel Kanaan, Kevin Wallis, Wayne Testori, Byron Abalos, Paloma Nunez and Aditi Raina, Abroad: "Celebrity Culture"; George Reinblatt, Aisha Brown, Jeff Rothpan, Rob Michaels and Jeremy Woodcock, Roast Battle Canada: "Hisham Kelati v Mark Little, Marito Lopez v Sophie Buddle"

== All-platform awards ==
One major category is currently presented without regard to the distinction between film, television or web media content.

Stunt Coordination
- Steven McMichael and Leslie McMichael, Wynonna Earp: Vengeance
- James Binkley and Andrew Simpson, Out Come the Wolves
- Jean Frenette, Dark Match
- Sean Skene and Rick Skene, Deaner '89
- John Stead, Law & Order Toronto: Criminal Intent: "The Key to the Castle"

== Audience awards ==
Cogeco Fund Audience Choice	Canada Media Fund Kids' Choice
The Way Home; Abroad; Don't Even; Dragons' Den; Heartland; Law & Order Toronto: Criminal Intent; Made for TV with Boman Martinez-Reid; Murdoch Mysteries; The Office Movers; Wild Cards	Warrior Up!; Davey & Jonesie's Locker; Dino Ranch; Gangnam Project; Old Enough!; Rubble & Crew; The Next Step; Total Drama Island; Unicorn Academy; Wordsville

== Digital media ==
Original Program or Series, Fiction	Original Program or Series, Non-Fiction
Stories from My Gay Grandparents — Scott Farley, Perrie Voss, Andrew Nicholas McCann Smith, J Stevens, Ash DeVries; Get Up, Aisha — Nisha Khan, Rabiya Mansoor, Marushka Jessica Almeida, Jonas Diamond; My Dead Mom — Lauren Corber, Palmer Baranek, Wendy Litner; Space Janitors — Davin Lengyel, Mark De Angelis, Brendan Halloran; These Triggas — Anthony Q. Farrell, Moné Flowers, Devon C. Codrington, Lex Emanuel, Matt Chenuz	Here & Queer — Peter Knegt, Lucius Dechausay, Mercedes Grundy, Chelle Turingan; About That with Andrew Chang — Andrew Chang, Lara Chatterjee, Alex Kress; ACTRA Toronto at TIFF — Cass Enright, Gabriella de la Torre; CBC Indigenous: Indigenous Politics in One Minute(ish) with Brett Forrester — Brett Forester, Fenn Mayes; Pride — Mark Kenneth Woods, James Hunter
Lead Performance in a Web Program or Series	Supporting Performance in a Web Program or Series
Megan Follows, My Dead Mom; Lisa Berry, Home; Lauren Collins, My Dead Mom; Scott Farley, Stories from My Gay Grandparents; Zarqa Nawaz, Zarqa; Ann Pirvu, Poly Is the New Monogamy; Perrie Voss, Stories from My Gay Grandparents; Connie Wang, Canadian Famous	Tricia Black, Stories from My Gay Grandparents; Salvatore Antonio, Nesting; Rainbow Sun Francks, My Dead Mom; Martha Irving, Everybody's Meg; Daniel Maslany, My Dead Mom; Jenny Raven, My Dead Mom; Martin Roach, Get Up, Aisha; Kris Siddiqi, Space Janitors
Direction in a Web Program or Series	Host in a Web Program or Series
Vanessa Magic, Near or Far: "Return to the Mean"; Katelyn McCulloch, Everybody's Meg: "Meg Works Out"; Zarqa Nawaz, Zarqa: "Pilot"; Anubhav Singh, Get Up, Aisha: "New Beginnings"; J Stevens, Stories from My Gay Grandparents: "Cyrano She Betta Don't"	Andrew Chang, About That with Andrew Chang; Gabriella de la Torre, ACTRA Toronto at TIFF; Peter Knegt, Here & Queer; Darren Stewart-Jones, Ruby Tries Everything; Mark Kenneth Woods, Saba Akhtar and Christian Yves Jones, Pride
Picture Editing in a Web Program or Series	Writing in a Web Program or Series
Maureen Grant, My Dead Mom: "Shana Tova"; Brittany Farhat, CBC Music Presents: Live at Massey Hall: "Celebrating Gordon Lightfoot"; Becky Swannick, Everybody's Meg: "Meg Works Out"; Adrian Vieni, CBC Music Presents: Live at Massey Hall: "Charlotte Cardin"; Perrie Voss, Stories from My Gay Grandparents: "Dodging Balls"	Wendy Litner, My Dead Mom: "Shana Tova"; Andrew Chang, Lauren Bird, Lara Chatterjee, Alex Kress and Sarah Peterson, About That with Andrew Chang: "Who's telling the truth about the capital gains tax?"; Anthony Q. Farrell, These Triggas: "Cuhz / Can b4 Fro"; Maddy Foley and Katelyn McCulloch, Everybody's Meg: "Meg Goes Shopping"; Duana Taha, Near or Far: "Home for the Holidays"
Immersive Experience
Oto's Planet — Nicolas S. Roy; Spots of Light — Adam Weingrod, Sean Evans, Nimrod Shanit; Texada — Claire Sanford, Josephine Anderson
