= List of Crave original programming =

Crave (formerly CraveTV) is a Canadian over-the-top streaming television service owned by Bell Media. It distributes a number of original programs, including programming originally produced for Bell Media linear television services (such as CTV and Noovo), and productions commissioned specifically for the service which are labeled "Crave Originals".

== Current programming ==
=== Drama ===
Title	Genre	Premiere	Seasons	Runtime	Status
Heated Rivalry	Sports romance drama	November 25, 2025	1 season, 6 episodes	40–60 min	Renewed
The Borderline	Crime drama	February 8, 2026	1 season, 6 episodes	40–46 min	Pending
Yaga	Supernatural mystery	October 23, 2026	1 season, 8 episodes	26–30 min (Note: The series will be available as four 60-minute episodes for international distribution.)	Season 1 ongoing
Empathy (French: Empathie)	Psychological drama	April 10, 2025	1 season, 10 episodes	45–50 min	Renewed

=== Comedy ===
Title	Genre	Premiere	Seasons	Runtime	Status
Shoresy	Sitcom	May 13, 2022	5 seasons, 30 episodes	19–33 min	Renewed
Late Bloomer	Comedy drama	January 19, 2024	3 seasons, 24 episodes	23–39 min	Pending
The Office Movers	Workplace comedy	October 10, 2024	2 seasons, 14 episodes	20–30 min	Renewed
Anna Comes Home (French: Le retour d'Anna Brodeur)	Sitcom	October 30, 2024	2 seasons, 20 episodes	43 min	Pending
Bon Cop, Bad Cop	Police procedural comedy	May 7, 2026	1 season, 6 episodes	43 min	Pending
Slo Pitch	Mockumentary	September 25, 2026	1 season, 10 episodes	21–25 min	Pending

=== Animation ===
Title	Genre	Premiere	Seasons	Runtime	Status
Super Team Canada	Adult animation	May 16, 2025	1 season, 10 episodes	21 min	Renewed

=== Unscripted ===
==== Docuseries ====
Title	Subject	Premiere	Seasons	Runtime	Status
The Rebuild: Inside the Montreal Canadiens	Sports	September 18, 2024	2 seasons, 14 episodes	44 min	Renewed
An Optimist's Guide to the Planet	Travel	May 2, 2025	2 seasons, 12 episodes	48 min	Pending

==== Reality ====
Title	Genre	Premiere	Seasons	Runtime	Status
Canada's Drag Race	Reality competition	July 2, 2020	6 seasons, 56 episodes	60 min	Renewed
Temptations Under the Sun: Cyprus	Reality dating competition	August 7, 2026	1 season, 10 episodes	46–54 min	Renewed
Slaycation	Reality	December 31, 2024	2 seasons, 12 episodes	24–46 min	Pending
Drag Brunch Saved My Life	Makeover	May 2, 2025	1 season, 8 episodes	40–60 min	Renewed
Project Runway Canada	Fashion design	November 14, 2025	1 season, 10 episodes	41–43 min	Renewed

=== Co-productions ===
Title	Genre	Partner/Country	Premiere	Seasons	Runtime	Status
Anna Pigeon	Crime drama	USA Network/United States	August 7, 2026	1 season, 10 episodes	42 min	Renewed
It Gets Worse	Comedy	Channel 4/United Kingdom	October 22, 2026	1 season, 6 episodes	23–24 min	Pending

== Upcoming programming ==
=== Drama ===
Title	Genre	Premiere	Seasons	Runtime
The Hidden Keys	Mystery thriller	TBA	1 season, 8 episodes	60 min
I'm Not Here to Hurt You	Crime drama	TBA	1 season, 10 episodes	60 min
Je te tiens	Psychological thriller	TBA	1 season, 8 episodes	60 min
Seoul Palace	Drama	TBA	1 season, 6 episodes	60 min
Sigil	Live-action animated fantasy horror	TBA	1 season, 8 episodes	60 min

=== Comedy ===
Title	Genre	Premiere	Seasons	Runtime
I Kill the Bear	Comedy	2026	1 season, 6 episodes	30 min
Cats in the Plateau	Comedy	2027	1 season, 6 episodes	30 min
I Can't Save You	Comedy	2027	1 season, 8 episodes	30 min
Meatballs	Comedy	2027	1 season, 8 episodes	30 min
Salty	Comedy	2027	1 season, 8 episodes	30 min
Bulges	Workplace comedy	TBA	1 season, 8 episodes	30 min
Golden Mile	Workplace comedy	TBA	1 season, 6 episodes	30 min

=== Kids & family ===
Title	Genre	Premiere	Seasons	Runtime
The Littlest Hobo	Drama	TBA	TBA	TBA

== Ended programming ==
=== Drama ===
Title	Genre	Premiere	Finale	Seasons	Runtime	Notes
Way Over Me (French: Sortez-moi de moi)	Thriller drama	May 7, 2021	May 7, 2021	1 season, 6 episodes	43–49 min	
Little Bird	Historical drama	May 26, 2023	June 30, 2023	1 season, 8 episodes	42–50 min	
So Long, Marianne	Biographical drama	September 27, 2024	September 27, 2024	1 season, 10 episodes	44–49 min	

=== Comedy ===
Title	Genre	Premiere	Finale	Seasons	Runtime	Notes
Letterkenny	Sitcom	February 7, 2016	December 25, 2023	12 seasons, 81 episodes	19–30 min	
New Eden	Mockumentary	December 31, 2019	December 31, 2019	1 season, 8 episodes	25–40 min	
Pillow Talk	Sketch comedy	February 10, 2022	August 18, 2023	2 seasons, 20 episodes	22–25 min	
Good Morning Chuck (French: Bon matin Chuck)	Comedy drama	May 24, 2023	May 24, 2023	1 season, 10 episodes	43 min	
The Dessert	Sketch comedy	July 7, 2023	July 7, 2023	1 season, 6 episodes	20–21 min	
I Have Nothing	Documentary comedy	September 23, 2023	September 23, 2023	1 season, 6 episodes	31–43 min	
Bria Mack Gets a Life	Sitcom	October 13, 2023	October 13, 2023	1 season, 6 episodes	21–24 min	
The Trades	Web series	March 22, 2024	June 4, 2026	3 seasons, 24 episodes	24 min	
Don't Even	Coming of age	August 23, 2024	September 8, 2024	3 seasons, 24 episodes	22–28 min	
My Dead Mom	Web series	November 1, 2024	November 1, 2024	1 season, 7 episodes	11–18 min	

=== Animation ===
Title	Genre	Premiere	Finale	Seasons	Runtime	Notes
Denis and Me	Adventure fiction	November 29, 2020	October 21, 2023	3 seasons, 35 episodes	3–11 min	

=== Unscripted ===
==== Docuseries ====
Title	Subject	Premiere	Finale	Seasons	Runtime	Notes
We're All Gonna Die (Even Jay Baruchel)	Science	April 30, 2022	April 19, 2024	2 seasons, 12 episodes	27–29 min	
Cocaine, Prison & Likes: Isabelle's True Story	Drug trafficking	December 2, 2022	December 2, 2022	1 season, 3 episodes	43 min	

==== Variety ====
Title	Genre	Premiere	Finale	Seasons	Runtime	Notes
1 Queen 5 Queers	Talk show	December 9, 2021	September 1, 2022	2 seasons, 16 episodes	28–35 min	
