= Andrew Gordon Macpherson =

Canadian film and television composer

Andrew Gordon Macpherson is a Canadian film and television composer from Halifax, Nova Scotia. He is most noted for his work on the television documentary series Dark Side of the Ring and its spinoffs.

Previously a musician in various Halifax-area bands, he has also released music under the band name ANGO, and has been a record producer. He initially worked on the first season of Dark Side of the Ring in collaboration with Wade McNeil, before going on to become the show's primary composer in future seasons.

== Filmography ==
- My Favourite Thing - 2013
- And They Watched - 2015
- It's Suppertime! - 2017–18
- The Ranger - 2018
- Far Cry 5 - 2018
- Random Acts of Violence - 2019
- Danny's Girl - 2020
- Spare Parts - 2020
- Dark Side of the Ring - 2019–25
- Kids vs. Aliens - 2022
- Tales from the Territories - 2022
- Who Killed WCW? - 2024
- Piñata Smashlings - 2025

== Awards ==
Award	Date of ceremony	Category	Work	Result	Ref.
Canadian Screen Awards	2025	Best Original Music, Factual, Lifestyle, Reality or Entertainment	Dark Side of the Ring	Nominated	
Canadian Screen Awards	2025	Best Original Music, Factual, Lifestyle, Reality or Entertainment	Who Killed WCW?	Nominated	
Canadian Screen Music Awards	2022	Best Original Score for a Non-Fiction Series or Limited Series	Dark Side of the Ring	Nominated	
Canadian Screen Music Awards	2023	Best Original Score for a Documentary, Factual or Reality Series or Special	Tales from the Territories	Nominated	
Canadian Screen Music Awards	2024	Best Original Score for a Documentary, Factual or Reality Series or Special	Dark Side of the Ring	Nominated	
