= Jason Eisener =

Canadian filmmaker, screenwriter, producer, and editor

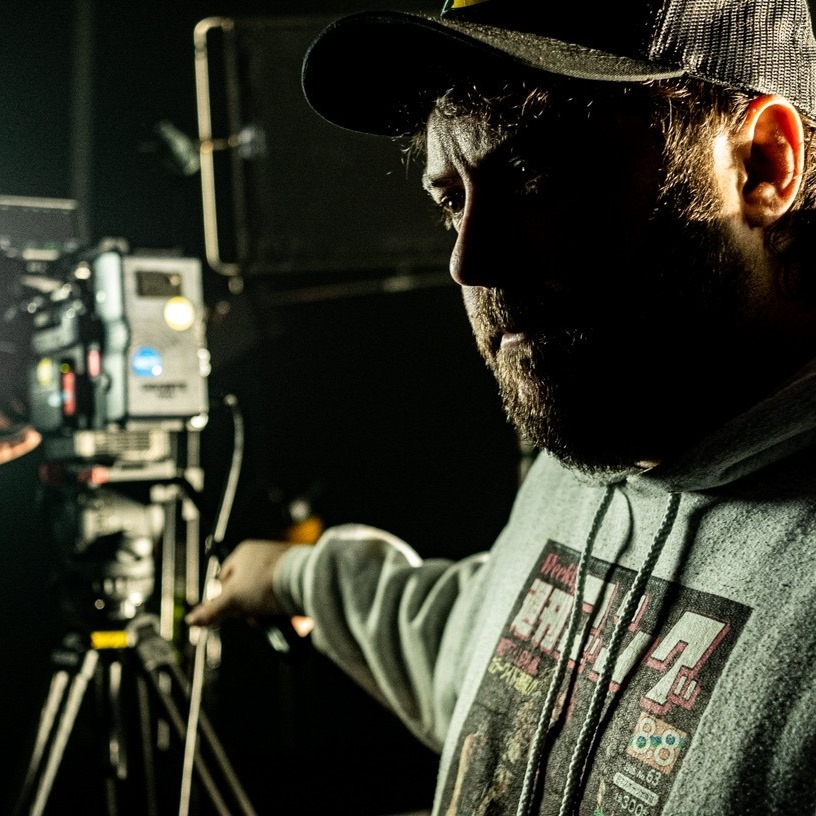
- Eisener on set
- Born: 1982 (age 43–44); Halifax, Nova Scotia, Canada
- Occupations: Film director, producer, screenwriter, editor
- Years active: 2007–present

Jason Eisener (born 1982) is a Canadian director, screenwriter, producer, and editor from Dartmouth, Nova Scotia. He is best known as the co-creator, executive producer, and director of the critically acclaimed documentary series Dark Side of the Ring (2019–present), and for directing the cult feature film Hobo with a Shotgun (2011).

== Early life ==
Eisener was born in Halifax and raised in Dartmouth, Nova Scotia. He developed an early interest in genre cinema, particularly horror and exploitation films, which influenced his later work. Eisener studied film at the Nova Scotia Community College, where he honed his skills in filmmaking and storytelling.

== Career ==
=== Early shorts and breakthrough ===
Eisener first gained attention in 2007 when he won the Grindhouse fake trailer contest, a promotion by Robert Rodriguez and Quentin Tarantino, with his entry Hobo with a Shotgun. The short became a viral hit and was later expanded into a feature film.

In 2008, he directed Treevenge, a dark comedy about Christmas trees taking revenge on humans. The short won awards at the Sundance Film Festival and other festivals.

He went on to contribute anthology segments to The ABCs of Death (2012) and V/H/S/2 (2013). Eisener also created the viral horror short One Last Dive (2013), set entirely underwater.

=== Feature films ===
In 2011, Eisener directed the feature-length version of Hobo with a Shotgun, starring Rutger Hauer.

His second feature, the sci-fi horror adventure Kids vs. Aliens (2022), premiered at Fantastic Fest before a wider release.

=== Documentary and television work ===
Eisener is the co-creator, executive producer, and director of Dark Side of the Ring, which became Vice TV’s flagship series. Now six seasons in, the critically acclaimed documentary has won a Canadian Screen Award and inspired spin-offs including Dark Side of the ’90s, Dark Side of Comedy, and Dark Side of the Cage.

He also co-created Tales from the Territories (2022), executive produced by Dwayne Johnson and Dany Garcia.

In 2024, he co-created Who Killed WCW?, which premiered as the biggest series launch in Vice TV history.

Most recently, Eisener co-created the Hulu docuseries Into the Void, a multi-part exploration of heavy metal musicians and their cultural impact.

== Style and themes ==
Eisener’s work often blends gore, satire, and nostalgia, drawing heavily on grindhouse, exploitation, and cult cinema. His films are noted for bold visual style, practical effects, and darkly comedic tone.

== Filmography ==
=== Film ===
Short film

Year	Title	Notes	Ref.
2008	Treevenge	Also writer	
2012	Y is for Youngbuck	Segment of The ABCs of Death	
2013	Slumber Party Alien Abduction	Segment of V/H/S/2	
2013	One Last Dive		
2026	Project Shamrock: The Secret Origins of Michael Myers Exposed	Fan film connected to the Halloween franchise	

Feature film

Year	Title	Director	Writer	Ref.
2011	Hobo with a Shotgun	Yes	No	
2022	Kids vs. Aliens	Yes	Yes	

Second Unit Director

- Death Note (2017)

=== Television ===
Year	Title	Director	Executive Producer	Creator	Ref.
2019–present	Dark Side of the Ring	Yes	Yes	Yes	
2022	Tales from the Territories	No	No	Yes	
2024	Who Killed WCW?	No	No	Yes	
2025	Into the Void	No	No	Yes	

== Awards and nominations ==
- Canadian Screen Award: Who Killed WCW? (2025) – Nominee, Best Factual Series

== Personal life ==
Jason Eisener splits his time between Dartmouth, Nova Scotia, and Los Angeles, California.
