= Joze Piranian =

Lebanese-Canadian stand-up comedian and motivational speaker

Joze Piranian is a Lebanese-Canadian stand-up comedian and motivational speaker.

Affected by a severe stuttering issue, Piranian spent much of his childhood in Lebanon speaking as little as possible to avoid embarrassment. He spent some time in the United Kingdom pursuing stuttering therapy, learning breathing techniques that he can use to reduce the impact of his stutter, and later moved to Canada to pursue a degree in business management at McGill University. While at McGill he began to pursue both stand-up comedy and public speaking as ways to gain the self-confidence that he had struggled with in his youth.

As a mental health speaker, he advocates avoiding expectations of "one singular breakthrough", stating that "smaller, repeated moments of exposure to uncomfortable situations are what will lead to sustained growth and resilience."

In 2023 he appeared in the third season of Canada's Got Talent, although he did not advance into the semi-finals.

In 2025 he appeared in the second All Access Comedy special.

== Words Left Unspoken ==
In 2024 he was profiled in Words Left Unspoken, a documentary film by Josiane Blanc. The film premiered on October 26, 2024, at the Reelworld Film Festival, in advance of its television debut on CBC Gem in February 2025.

The film received three Canadian Screen Award nominations at the 13th Canadian Screen Awards, for Best Documentary Program, Best Direction in a Documentary Program and Best Writing in a Documentary Program.
