= Law & Order Toronto: Criminal Intent =

2024 Canadian drama TV series

- Genre: Police procedural; Drama
- Developed by: Tassie Cameron
- Starring: Aden Young; Kathleen Munroe; K. C. Collins; Karen Robinson; Luke Kirby
- Narrated by: Steven Zirnkilton
- Opening theme: "Theme of Law & Order Toronto: Criminal Intent"
- Country of origin: Canada
- Original language: English
- No. of seasons: 4
- No. of episodes: 38

Production
- Producers: Tassie Cameron; Erin Haskett; David Valleau; Amy Cameron; Alex Patrick; Holly Dale; Wanda Chaffey; Tex Antonucci
- Running time: 45 minutes
- Production companies: Lark Productions; Cameron Pictures; Universal International Studios (2024–2026); Universal Global Television (2026–present)

Original release
- Network: Citytv
- Release: February 22, 2024 – present

Related
- Law & Order franchise

Law & Order Toronto: Criminal Intent is a Canadian police procedural and drama television series that is based on the American series Law & Order: Criminal Intent. The series is set in Toronto, Ontario, and centres on crime stories "ripped from the headlines", in the style of the original Law & Order.

The series premiered on February 22, 2024, on Citytv, and became the #1 prime-time drama of the year in Canada by attracting 1.1 million views on the first episode. The first season ran for 10 episodes; in June 2024, it was renewed for a second and third season. The second season premiered on February 20, 2025. The third season premiered on March 5, 2026. In April 2026, it was renewed for a fourth season. The fourth season premiered on October 1, 2026.

== Premise ==
In Toronto's war on crime, the worst offenders are pursued by the detectives of the Specialized Criminal Investigations Unit. These are their stories.

— Opening narration by Steven Zirnkilton

A psychological thriller wrapped in a criminal investigation, the series follows a squad of detectives from the Specialized Criminal Investigations Unit, a major case squad in the fictional Toronto Police Department. These detectives investigate high-profile homicides and corruptions in metro Toronto.

== Cast and characters ==
=== Main ===
- Aden Young as Senior Detective Sergeant Henry Graff (seasons 1–3)
- Kathleen Munroe as Junior Detective Sergeant Frankie Bateman
- K. C. Collins as Deputy Crown Attorney Theo Forrester
- Karen Robinson as Inspector Vivienne Holness
- Luke Kirby as Senior Detective Sergeant John Darcy (season 4–present)

=== Recurring ===
- Nicola Correia-Damude as Dr. Lucy Da Silva
- Araya Mengesha as Detective/Technology Expert Mark Yohannes
- Tammy Isbell as Detective Alice Riley
- Catherine Disher as Attorney Deb Sutton

=== Notable guest stars ===
- Noam Jenkins as Councillor John Graham
- Amanda Brugel as Lee Cole
- Tim Rozon as Roman Rush
- Keshia Chanté as Deja
- Diana Leblanc as Verena Follows
- Rachael Crawford as Susan Wright
- Rachelle Lefevre as Ellen Stewart
- John Ralston as Christopher Parsons
- Jake Epstein as Andrew
- Laura Vandervoort as Jessica Cartwright
- Richard Harmon as Curtis
- Currie Graham as Jack Walding
- Ted Dykstra as Jay Diaz
- Christine Horne as Lina Henkel
- Olivia Chow, Mayor of Toronto, as herself
- Jay Ryan as Myles Graff
- Martin Donovan as Charles Graff
- Lola Flanery as Ava Lancaster
- David Cronenberg as Dr. Levi Bateman
- Aaron Ashmore as Jeremy Ellsworth
- Jedidiah Goodacre as Lieutenant Rhys Manning
- James Gallanders as Captain Rob Pritchard
- Jo Vannicola as Fire Investigator Jodie Adams
- Hart Bochner as Dr. Jim Burgess
- Zachary Bennett as Vince Jones

== Episodes ==
=== Series overview ===
Season	Episodes	Originally aired	
Season	Episodes	First aired	Last aired
1	10	February 22, 2024	May 16, 2024
2	10	February 20, 2025	May 15, 2025
3	10	March 5, 2026	May 14, 2026
4	10	October 1, 2026	December 3, 2026

=== Season 1 (2024) ===
No. overall	No. in season	Title	Directed by	Written by	Original release date
1	1	"The Key to the Castle"	Holly Dale	Tassie Cameron	February 22, 2024
2	2	"Good Neighbours"	Peter Stebbings	Sam Godfrey	February 29, 2024
3	3	"The Real Eve"	Holly Dale	Jillian Locke	March 7, 2024
4	4	"Crack Reporter"	David Wellington	Sherry White	March 14, 2024
5	5	"Bleeding Hearts"	Sudz Sutherland	Annmarie Morais	March 21, 2024
6	6	"Minnow and the Shark"	Rachel Leiterman	Aubrey Nealon	April 11, 2024
7	7	"The Sound of Silence"	Winnifred Jong	Tassie Cameron & Noelle Carbone	April 18, 2024
8	8	"Boys Will Be Boys"	David Straiton	Noelle Carbone & Annmarie Morais	May 2, 2024
9	9	"Three Points"	Holly Dale	Tassie Cameron	May 9, 2024
10	10	"Cul-De-Sac"	Sharon Lewis	Sam Godfrey & Jillian Locke	May 16, 2024

=== Season 2 (2025) ===
No. overall	No. in season	Title	Directed by	Written by	Original release date
11	1	"White Squirrel City"	Peter Stebbings	Tassie Cameron	February 20, 2025
12	2	"Digital Lipstick"	David Wellington	Jillian Locke	February 27, 2025
13	3	"Fool's Gold"	Winnifred Jong	Sam Godfrey	March 6, 2025
14	4	"Hoggs Hollow"	Sudz Sutherland	Aubrey Nealon	March 20, 2025
15	5	"Face Value"	Sharon Lewis	Stephen Cochrane	April 3, 2025
16	6	"Disposable People"	Peter Stebbings	Seneca Aaron	April 10, 2025
17	7	"The Man in the Stadium"	Sudz Sutherland	Sam Godfrey	April 17, 2025
18	8	"Canadian Dream"	Chloé Robichaud	Tassie Cameron & Rory Diamond	May 1, 2025
19	9	"Bitter Pill"	Renuka Jeyapalan	Seneca Aaron & Jillian Locke	May 8, 2025
20	10	"Tango Romeo"	David Wellington	Tassie Cameron	May 15, 2025

=== Season 3 (2026) ===
No. overall	No. in season	Title	Directed by	Written by	Original release date
21	1	"Skin Deep"	Sudz Sutherland	Stephen Cochrane & Adriana Maggs	March 5, 2026
22	2	"WAGMI"	Winnifred Jong	Tassie Cameron & Rory Diamond	March 12, 2026
23	3	"Uncertain Justice"	Jordan Canning	Jillian Locke	March 19, 2026
24	4	"Forget Me Not"	Zoe Leigh Hopkins	Tassie Cameron & Stephen Cochrane	March 26, 2026
25	5	"Up to Snuff"	John Fawcett	Rory Diamond & Adriana Maggs	April 2, 2026
K. C. Collins does not appear in this episode.
26	6	"Family Meal"	David Wellington	Sam Godfrey	April 9, 2026
27	7	"Whole Lotta Love"	Chloé Robichaud	Tassie Cameron & Jillian Locke	April 23, 2026
28	8	"The Winning Bid"	Peter Stebbings	René Balcer & Aubrey Nealon	April 30, 2026
29	9	"Lost & Unfound"	Winnifred Jong	René Balcer & Carina Samuels	May 7, 2026
30	10	"XOXO"	David Wellington	Tassie Cameron	May 14, 2026

=== Season 4 (2026) ===
No. overall	No. in season	Title	Directed by	Written by	Original release date
31	1	"Diplomatico"	David Wellington	Tassie Cameron	October 1, 2026
32	2	"The Scorpion and the Tortoise"	Chloé Robichaud	Sam Godfrey	October 1, 2026
33	3	"The Business of Boys"	Chloé Robichaud	Stephen Cochrane	October 8, 2026
34	4	"True Patriot Love"	Winnifred Jong	Rory Diamond	October 15, 2026
35	5	"Bad Campers"	Sharon Lewis	Carina Samuels	October 22, 2026
36	6	"Wind Phone"	Sharon Lewis	Sam Godfrey	October 29, 2026
37	7	"Fireworks"	David Wellington	Tassie Cameron & Carina Samuels	November 5, 2026
38	8	"Family Tree"	Sudz Sutherland	Rory Diamond & Tamara Moulin	November 12, 2026
39	9	"Canary"	TBA	TBA	November 19, 2026
40	10	"Red Flags"	TBA	TBA	December 3, 2026

== Production ==
In June 2023, it was announced that Law & Order Toronto: Criminal Intent had been given a 10-episode series order, based on the original series created by Dick Wolf and René Balcer for Universal Television. The series is produced by Lark Productions and Cameron Pictures. Directors include Holly Dale who directed the 1st, 3rd and 9th episodes, as well as David Wellington, Peter Stebbings, Sudz Sutherland, Rachel Leiterman, Winnifred Jong, Sharon Lewis and David Straiton.

The episode "Crack Reporter" was partially inspired by the crack cocaine scandal that involved former Toronto mayor Rob Ford in 2013.

The series was renewed for a second and third season in June 2024.

The series was then renewed for a fourth season in April 2026. Young will not be returning for the fourth season, which will see Luke Kirby join the cast as Detective Sergeant John Darcy.

== Broadcast ==
On February 22, 2024, Law & Order Toronto: Criminal Intent started airing on Citytv on Thursdays at 8 p.m. ET. This addition to the Law & Order Thursdays lineup moved Law & Order, which regularly aired in simulcast with NBC, to air an hour earlier at 7 p.m. ET with Law & Order: Special Victims Unit and Law & Order: Organized Crime remaining at 9 p.m. and 10 p.m. ET respectively. Season 2 was given a new timeslot moving to Thursdays at 10 p.m. ET, the former timeslot of Found, which moved to 7 p.m. ET, airing three hours earlier than NBC.

The CW has acquired American broadcasting rights to the series for the first two seasons. The first season premiered on September 24, 2025. The second season premiered on October 5, 2026.

== Awards and nominations ==
Year (Note: The listed year refers to the date of the ceremony, not necessarily the year in which the corresponding season or episode aired.)	Award	Category	Nominee(s)	Result	Ref.
2025	ACTRA Awards in Toronto	Outstanding Performance – Male	Sergio Di Zio (for "The Sound of Silence")	Nominated	
2025	ACTRA Awards in Toronto	Members’ Choice Series Ensemble Award	Law & Order Toronto: Criminal Intent	Won	
2025	ACTRA Awards in Toronto	Stunt Ensemble Award	Anita Nittoly, Christopher Cordell, John Stead, Ruth Chiang (for "The Key to the Castle")	Won	
2025	Canadian Screen Awards	Best Drama Series	Law & Order Toronto: Criminal Intent (Note: Nominees: Tassie Cameron, Erin Haskett, David Valleau, Amy Cameron, Alex Patrick, Wanda Chaffey, and Tex Antonucci)	Won	
2025	Canadian Screen Awards	Best Lead Performer – Drama Series	Aden Young	Nominated	
2025	Canadian Screen Awards	Best Lead Performer – Drama Series	Kathleen Munroe	Nominated	
2025	Canadian Screen Awards	Best Supporting Performer – Drama Series	Karen Robinson	Nominated	
2025	Canadian Screen Awards	Best Direction – Drama Series	Holly Dale (for "Three Points")	Nominated	
2025	Canadian Screen Awards	Best Direction – Drama Series	Sharon Lewis (for "Cul-De-Sac")	Nominated	
2025	Canadian Screen Awards	Best Writing – Drama Series	Tassie Cameron (for "The Key to the Castle")	Won	
2025	Canadian Screen Awards	Best Guest Performance – Drama Series	Amanda Brugel (for "The Real Eve")	Nominated	
2025	Canadian Screen Awards	Best Guest Performance – Drama Series	Blessing Adedijo (for "Bleeding Hearts")	Nominated	
2025	Canadian Screen Awards	Best Guest Performance – Drama Series	Sydney Meyer (for "The Sound of Silence")	Nominated	
2025	Canadian Screen Awards	Best Achievement in Casting – Fiction	Sharon Forrest	Nominated	
2025	Canadian Screen Awards	Best Achievement in Hair	Lydia Pensa (for "The Key to the Castle")	Nominated	
2025	Canadian Screen Awards	Best Achievement in Make-Up	Lynda McCormack (for "Three Points")	Nominated	
2025	Canadian Screen Awards	Best Costume Design	Nicole Manek (for "The Key to the Castle")	Nominated	
2025	Canadian Screen Awards	Best Photography – Drama Series	David Greene (for "The Key to the Castle")	Nominated	
2025	Canadian Screen Awards	Best Picture Editing – Drama Series	Wendy Hallam Martin (for "The Key to the Castle")	Nominated	
2025	Canadian Screen Awards	Best Picture Editing – Drama Series	John Nicholls (for "Minnow and the Shark")	Nominated	
2025	Canadian Screen Awards	Best Production Design or Art Direction – Fiction	Oleg Savytski (for "Cul-De-Sac")	Nominated	
2025	Canadian Screen Awards	Best Sound – Fiction	Martin Lee, Ella Melanson, Martin Gwynn Jones, Rob Warchol, Joe Mancuso, Zenon Waschuk, and John Elliot (for "The Sound of Silence")	Won	
2025	Canadian Screen Awards	Best Stunt Coordination	John Stead (for "The Key to the Castle")	Nominated	
2025	Canadian Screen Awards	Cogeco Fund Audience Choice	Law & Order Toronto: Criminal Intent	Nominated	
2025	Directors Guild of Canada Awards	Drama Series Crew of the Year	Law & Order Toronto: Criminal Intent season 2	Nominated	
2025	Directors Guild of Canada Awards	Best Sound Editing – Dramatic Series	Brent Pickett, Rob Warchol, Jean Bot, and Joe Mancuso (for "Tango Romeo")	Nominated	
2026	Writers Guild of Canada Screenwriting Awards	Drama Series	Tassie Cameron (for "Tango Romeo")	Nominated	
2026	ACTRA Awards in Toronto	Members’ Choice Series Ensemble Award	Law & Order Toronto: Criminal Intent	Nominated	
2026	Canadian Screen Awards	Best Drama Series	Law & Order Toronto: Criminal Intent	Nominated	
2026	Canadian Screen Awards	Best Lead Performer – Drama Series	Kathleen Munroe	Nominated	
2026	Canadian Screen Awards	Best Supporting Performer – Drama Series	Karen Robinson	Nominated	
2026	Canadian Screen Awards	Best Direction – Drama Series	Winnifred Jong (for "Fool's Gold")	Nominated	
2026	Canadian Screen Awards	Best Direction – Drama Series	Sudz Sutherland (for "The Man in the Stadium")	Nominated	
2026	Canadian Screen Awards	Best Writing – Drama Series	Tassie Cameron (for "Tango Romeo")	Nominated	
2026	Canadian Screen Awards	Best Guest Performance – Drama Series	Sarah Podemski (for "Digital Lipstick")	Nominated	
2026	Canadian Screen Awards	Best Guest Performance – Drama Series	Ennis Esmer (for "The Man in the Stadium")	Nominated	
2026	Canadian Screen Awards	Best Achievement in Casting – Fiction	Sharon Forrest	Nominated	
2026	Canadian Screen Awards	Best Achievement in Hair	Simone Finch (for "Bitter Pill")	Nominated	
2026	Canadian Screen Awards	Best Sound – Fiction	Martin Lee, J.R. Fountain, Brent Pickett, Rob Warchol, Joe Mancuso, and Zenon Waschuk (for "Face Value")	Nominated	
2026	Directors Guild of Canada Awards	Drama Series Crew of the Year	Law & Order Toronto: Criminal Intent season 3	Nominated	
