= All Access Comedy =

Canadian television specials by disabled comedians

All Access Comedy is a Canadian series of television stand-up comedy specials, aired annually on AMI-tv. Hosted by D.J. Demers, the specials highlight stand-up comedians with disabilities. The series is produced in collaboration with the Halifax Comedy Festival.

The first special, aired on February 9, 2024, featured Courtney Gilmour, Tanyalee Davis, Ahren Belisle and Ryan LaChance, while the second, broadcast on February 7, 2025, featured Michael McCreary, Joze Piranian, Dan Barra-Berger and Tina Friml. The third, broadcast on February 13, 2026, featured Todd Blenkhorn, Megan Milton, Josh Menchions and Ryan Niemiller.

Demers, Belisle, Davis, Gilmour and Lachance received a Canadian Screen Award nomination for Best Writing in a Variety or Sketch Comedy Program or Series at the 13th Canadian Screen Awards in 2025. Demers, Piranian, Barra-Berger and McCreary were nominated in the same category at the 14th Canadian Screen Awards in 2026.
