= For the Culture with Amanda Parris =

Canadian documentary television series

- Also known as: For the Culture
- Genre: Factual
- Created by: Amanda Parris
- Country of origin: Canada
- Original language: English
- No. of seasons: 1
- No. of episodes: 6

Production
- Executive producer: Amanda Parris
- Producer: Saman Malik
- Running time: 44-49 minutes
- Production company: Canadian Broadcasting Corporation (CBC)

Original release
- Network: CBC Gem
- Release: January 30, 2024

For the Culture with Amanda Parris is a documentary television series that explores pressing issues affecting members of the Black diaspora on a global scale, including education, Black maternal health care, conflicts within Black communities, Black leadership in corporations and institutions, reparations for stolen cultural heritage and the business of Black hair.

Season one of the series premiered on January 30, 2024, on CBC Gem.

In April 2025, the CBC announced the show's renewal for a second season.

== Premise ==
The series follows Amanda Parris as she travels to various locations to engage with cultural leaders, activists, scholars, and everyday people on issues central to Black communities. Through candid conversations and historical deep dives, For the Culture seeks to make complex issues accessible and compelling. Featured guests include writer and producer Larry Wilmore, best-selling author Bolu Babalola, comedian Gina Yashere, and activist Mwazulu Diyabanza, known for his efforts to reclaim stolen African artifacts.

== Episodes ==
No.	Title	Directed by	Written by	Original release date
1	"Diaspora Wars"	Saman Malik, Amanda Parris	Saman Malik, Amanda Parris	January 30, 2024
Diving into the conflicts that can happen within Black communities, Amanda travels to Grenada, England, New York and Toronto to unpack generations of baggage.
2	"The Glass Cliff"	Saman Malik, Amanda Parris	Saman Malik, Amanda Parris	January 30, 2024
Amanda considers the cultural reckoning of the past few years and the wave of Black leaders who were appointed during a global crisis: were these leaders set up to fail?
3	"A Failing Grade"	Saman Malik, Amanda Parris	Saman Malik, Amanda Parris	January 30, 2024
Amanda travels to the UK, US and Canada and questions why Black children frequently fall through the cracks in these public education systems. Is it time for something different?
4	"The Business of Black Hair"	Saman Malik, Amanda Parris	Saman Malik, Amanda Parris	January 30, 2024
The Black hair industry is worth billions of dollars but those profits are rarely enjoyed by its largest consumer: Black women. Amanda wants to find out why.
5	"The Standard of Care"	Saman Malik, Amanda Parris	Saman Malik, Amanda Parris	January 30, 2024
Black maternal health is in crisis. Amanda speaks to those on the front lines and asks: What is the standard of care necessary for Black birthing people to feel safe in childbirth?
6	"Reparations"	Saman Malik, Amanda Parris	Saman Malik, Amanda Parris	January 30, 2024
The renewed global call for reparations is about more than money. Amanda travels to Barbados, London and Paris to find out how the movement is making connections to the climate crisis.

== Awards ==
Award	Date of ceremony	Category	Recipient(s)	Result	Ref.
Canadian Screen Awards	2025	Best Host in a Variety, Lifestyle, Reality/Competition or Talk Program or Series	Amanda Parris	Nominated	
Canadian Screen Awards	2025	Best Direction in a Factual Program or Series	Amanda Parris, Saman Malik	Won	
Canadian Screen Awards	2025	Best Writing in a Factual Program or Series	Amanda Parris, Saman Malik	Nominated	
Canadian Screen Awards	2025	Best Editorial Research	Amanda Parris, Saman Malik, Yasmine Mathurin, Sara Yacobi-Harris, Christine Charles, Christine Jean-Baptiste	Nominated	
