= 1 Man's Treasure =

Canadian comedy web series

1 Man's Treasure is a Canadian comedy web series, which premiered in 2023 on Bell Fibe TV. The series is a mockumentary starring comedian Ron James as a fictionalized version of himself, purportedly having given up stand-up comedy to pursue a new career in treasure hunting.

The cast also includes Patrick McKenna as producer Bobby Smith and Jonathan Torrens appearing on-screen in his capacity as director of both the real series and the in-universe metaseries, as well as guest appearances by Koumbie, Mary-Colin Chisholm, Kathryn Greenwood and Paul Sun-Hyung Lee.

The first season features James searching for the Oak Island Treasure, while the second features him on the trail of a legend about buried gold in the Niagara Region of Ontario.

== Awards ==
Year	Award	Category	Recipients	Result	Ref.
Canadian Screen Awards	2024	Best Supporting Performance in a Web Program or Series	Patrick McKenna	Nominated	
Canadian Screen Awards	2024	Best Direction in a Web Program or Series	Jonathan Torrens	Nominated	
Canadian Screen Awards	2025	Best Supporting Performance in a Comedy Program or Series	Patrick McKenna	Nominated	
Canadian Screen Awards	2025	Best Guest Performance in a Comedy Program or Series	Kathryn Greenwood	Nominated	
Canadian Screen Awards	2025	Best Guest Performance in a Comedy Program or Series	Paul Sun-Hyung Lee	Nominated	
