= Tales from the Territories =

Canadian documentary television series on professional wrestling

- Genre: Professional wrestling Documentary
- Created by: Evan Husney; Jason Eisener
- Directed by: Jason Eisener
- Narrated by: Sean K. Robb
- Composers: Jason Eisener; Andrew Gordon Macpherson
- Country of origin: Canada
- Original language: English
- No. of seasons: 1
- No. of episodes: 10

Production
- Executive producers: Suroosh Alvi; Bradley Brough; Vanessa Case
- Producer: Various
- Running time: 60 min.
- Production companies: Vice Studios Canada; Seven Bucks Productions

Original release
- Network: Vice; Crave
- Release: October 4 – December 6, 2022

Tales from the Territories is a Canadian documentary television series produced by Vice Studios Canada and Seven Bucks Productions. It premiered on April 10, 2022 on Vice TV in the United States, and on Crave's streaming and TV network in Canada.

The show focuses on the Territory days of the professional wrestling industry, when the National Wrestling Association (NWA) divided North America (and in certain international markets) into smaller regional organizations.

== List of Tales from the Territories episodes ==
No.	Title	Subject(s)	Original release date
1	"Memphis: Where Wrestling was Real"	The Continental Wrestling Association from the Mid-South Coliseum in Memphis, Tennessee	October 4, 2022
2	"Andy Kaufman vs. The King of Memphis"	The rivalry between Andy Kaufman and Jerry "The King" Lawler in Memphis.	October 11, 2022
3	"AWA: Bodyslams in the Heartland"	Verne Gagne and the American Wrestling Association (AWA).	October 18, 2022
4	"CWF: Bloodstains in the Everglades"	Championship Wrestling from Florida and the superstars that established themselves in the territory, including Hulk Hogan.	October 25, 2022
5	"Stampede: The Hart of Pro Wrestling"	Stampede Wrestling and the legendary Calgary based Hart Family headed by Stu Hart.	October 25, 2022
6	"Polynesian Pro: Wrestling's Island Dynasty"	Peter Maivia's Polynesian Pro Wrestling	November 8, 2022
7	"Portland: Where Wrestling Got Weird"	The Pacific Northwest Wrestling in the Portland territory.	November 15, 2022
8	"WCCW: Wrestling's Lone Star Legacy"	World Class Championship Wrestling led by the Von Erich family headed by Fritz Von Erich at the Dallas Sportatorium.	November 22, 2022
9	"Crockett: Evil Heels of the Carolinas"	Jim Crockett Promotions	November 29, 2022
10	"Mid-South: Bullets, Blades & Bar Fights"	Mid-South Wrestling led by Bill Watts, and the establishment of superstars such as Junkyard Dog, Jake "The Snake" Roberts and "Hacksaw" Jim Duggan.	December 6, 2022
