= Nobody Wants to Talk About Jacob Appelbaum =

- Directed by: Jamie Kastner
- Screenplay by: Jamie Kastner
- Produced by: Jamie Kastner; Laura Baron Kastner
- Starring: Jacob Appelbaum
- Edited by: Michael Hannan
- Music by: Tom Third
- Production company: Cave 7 Productions
- Distributed by: Canadian Broadcasting Corporation
- Release date: March 10, 2024
- Running time: 120 minutes
- Country: Canada
- Language: English

Nobody Wants to Talk About Jacob Appelbaum is a Canadian documentary film, directed by Jamie Kastner and released in 2024. The film centres on Jacob Appelbaum, the controversial hacktivist, including addressing the sexual misconduct allegations against Appelbaum.

The film was presented in private industry screenings at film festivals in the U.S. and Canada in 2023, before being broadcast by Documentary in March 2024. It was also subsequently screened at the 2024 San Francisco Jewish Film Festival, and was added to the CBC Gem streaming platform in June.

== Awards ==
Award	Date of ceremony	Category	Recipient	Result	Ref.
Canadian Screen Awards	2025	Best Documentary Program	Jamie Kastner, Laura Baron Kastner	Nominated	
Canadian Screen Awards	2025	Best Direction in a Documentary Program	Jamie Kastner	Nominated	
Canadian Screen Awards	2025	Best Original Music in a Documentary	Tom Third	Nominated	
Canadian Screen Awards	2025	Best Writing in a Documentary Program	Jamie Kastner	Nominated	
