= Paid in Full: The Battle for Black Music =

Paid in Full: The Battle for Black Music is a British-Canadian television documentary series, produced for the BBC and CBC by Mike Christie's Supercollider, Green Door Pictures and Pink Towel, in association with Catalyst. Executive producers included Idris Elba and Sabrina Elba. The series premiered on CBC Television and CBC Gem in Canada and BBC Two in the United Kingdom in 2024. The three-part series profiles the history of racial injustice in the music industry, which has left many Black musicians exploited and underpaid for their work.

Figures whose stories are explored in the series include Nina Simone, Billie Holiday, Bessie Smith, Chaka Khan, George Clinton, Monie Love, Nile Rodgers, Gloria Gaynor, Ice-T, Smokey Robinson, TLC and Cadence Weapon.

In Canada the series premiered on CBC Gem in September 2024 before being broadcast on the main CBC Television network in October, while in the United Kingdom it aired on BBC Two in September before being added to the BBC iPlayer streaming service. The Canadian broadcast was narrated by singer and broadcaster Jully Black, while the British broadcast was narrated by actress Zawe Ashton.

The series won the Canadian Screen Award for Best History Documentary Program or Series at the 13th Canadian Screen Awards in 2025.
