= Potluck Ladies =

Potluck Ladies is a Canadian television drama series, which premiered on Hollywood Suite and Yes TV in 2024. The series focuses on three immigrant women from South Asia who are living in the suburbs of Toronto while their husbands are working abroad, who meet regularly for potluck lunches and become a critical support system for each other as they struggle with various life challenges.

The series was created and produced by Shazia Javed, and co-written by Javed and Rahul Chaturvedi. It premiered May 1, 2024, on Hollywood Suite, before airing on Yes TV later in the month.

== Cast ==
- Natasha Krishnan as Sumaira
- Elisa Moolecherry as Azra
- Kavita Musty as Ruby
- Cindy Om as Nisha
- Alisha Camryn as Tooba
- Anju B Malhotra as Lata
- Asha Vijayasingham as Hira
- Adolyn H. Dar as Emanuel
- Ali Kazmi as Aamir
- Sameer Jafar as Mo

== Awards ==
The pilot episode was screened at the SeriesFest in Denver, Colorado, where it won the award for Best Drama Pilot.

The series received a Canadian Screen Award nomination for Best Dramatic Series, and Javed received a nomination for Best Writing in a Drama Series for the first episode, at the 13th Canadian Screen Awards in 2025.
