= Indigenous Art Adventures =

Canadian children's television series

Indigenous Art Adventures is a Canadian children's television series, which premiered in 2024 on Aboriginal Peoples Television Network. Hosted by Lance Cardinal, a two-spirit visual artist and educator from the Bigstone Cree Nation, the series features Cardinal demonstrating First Nations art projects using everyday household objects.

The program has its roots in a series of YouTube videos that Cardinal created for his own Family Art Adventures channel prior to being picked up by APTN.

The series won the Canadian Screen Award for Best Children's or Youth Non-Fiction Program or Series at the 13th Canadian Screen Awards in 2025.
