= The Tragically Hip: No Dress Rehearsal =

2024 Canadian documentary series

- Genre: Music documentary
- Directed by: Mike Downie
- Country of origin: Canada
- Original language: English
- No. of episodes: 4

Production
- Production companies: Fully and Complete Productions; Amazon MGM Studios

Original release
- Network: Amazon Prime Video

The Tragically Hip: No Dress Rehearsal is a Canadian television documentary series, which premiered on Prime Video in 2024. Directed by filmmaker Mike Downie, the four-episode series profiles the history of the influential Canadian rock band The Tragically Hip, including interviews with the band members and other cultural figures including musician Geddy Lee, comedians The Trailer Park Boys, actor Will Arnett and broadcaster George Stroumboulopoulos.

== Production ==
Downie described the series as "the most fulfilling experience and rewarding experience I’ve ever had in making a film", but also the hardest thing he had ever done since working on the project sparked a lot of memories of the death of lead singer Gord Downie, his brother.

According to Downie, the goal of the series was not just to document the band's history, but also to explore the question of how the band's music came to resonate so strongly with Canadians.

Downie conceived the project as "a film chopped into four pieces" rather than a television series, so that its presentation would be consistent throughout.

== Release ==
The series received a preview screening at the Royal Alexandra Theatre on September 5, 2024, as part of the Primetime program at the 2024 Toronto International Film Festival, in advance of its Prime Video debut on September 20. The screening was followed by an outdoor public singalong of Tragically Hip songs "Grace, Too", "Ahead by a Century" and "Bobcaygeon", led by Choir! Choir! Choir!

Within one week of its premiere on Prime Video, it had already become the most-watched Canadian documentary series, excluding sports documentaries, in the service's history.

In December 2024, the band released their 2021 Juno Awards performance of "It's a Good Life If You Don't Weaken", with Feist on lead vocals, as a promotional single for the series.

== Critical response ==
Alex Hudson of Exclaim! rated the series 8 out of 10, writing that "At the heart of the story, of course, is Gord Downie — whose art and personality retain a certain enigma in spite of this deep dive. His tragic absence means that he's never able to offer the same level of career retrospection as his bandmates. The final episode, which covers the end of the Hip as well as his later solo works and activism, is a tear-jerker. And yet, even in its saddest moments, No Dress Rehearsal is about celebrating rather than wallowing."

In its year-end review of Canadian film and television production in 2024, industry magazine Playback named it Documentary of the Year.

== Awards ==
Award	Year	Category	Recipient	Result	Ref.
Toronto International Film Festival	2024	People's Choice Award for Documentaries	Mike Downie	Won	
Canadian Screen Awards	2025	Best Biography or Arts Documentary Program or Series	Mike Downie, Jake Gold, Bryn Hughes, Kim Creelman, David Wells, Kalin Moon, Gord Sinclair, Rob Baker, Johnny Fay, Paul Langlois	Won	
Canadian Screen Awards	2025	Best Direction in a Documentary Series	Mike Downie	Won	
Canadian Screen Awards	2025	Best Editing in a Documentary Program or Series	Peter Denes	Won	
Canadian Screen Awards	2025	Best Photography in a Documentary or Factual Program or Series	Chris Romeike	Won	
Canadian Screen Awards	2025	Best Sound in a Documentary or Factual Program or Series	Jason Perreira, Robert Sinko, Sanjay Mehta	Won	
Canadian Screen Awards	2025	Best Editorial Research	Courtney Miceli, Kalin Moon, Jacob Akman	Won	
Canadian Screen Awards	2025	Best Visual Research	Elspeth Domville, David Wells	Won	
