= Mike Downie =

Canadian documentary filmmaker

- Occupation: Documentary filmmaker

Mike Downie is a Canadian documentary filmmaker. The older brother of late Tragically Hip frontman Gord Downie, he is best known for his work with the Gord Downie & Chanie Wenjack Fund.

The founder of the film production company Edgarland Films, Downie won a Gemini Award for Best Sports Program or Series in 2005 as coproducer with Nicholas de Pencier of The Hockey Nomad. He has won three Canadian Screen Awards, for Best Science or Nature Documentary in 2014 as director of "Invasion of the Brain Snatchers", which aired as an episode of The Nature of Things; Best Social or Political Documentary Program in 2018 as a producer of The Secret Path; and Best Direction in a Documentary Program in 2020 for the documentary Finding the Secret Path.

He was also a Gemini Award nominee in 2000 for Blue Rodeo: The Scenes in Between and in 2010 for One Ocean: Birth of an Ocean, and a CSA nominee in 2018 for Running on Empty: Surviving California's Epic Drought.

His film The COVID Cruise, a documentary about the COVID-19 outbreak on the Diamond Princess cruise ship in early 2020, was released as an episode of The Nature of Things in November 2020.

He directed The Tragically Hip: No Dress Rehearsal, a four-part documentary series about The Tragically Hip which was released in 2024.
