= Zarqa (web series) =

Canadian comedy web series

Zarqa is a Canadian comedy web series, which premiered in 2022 on CBC Gem. The series stars Zarqa Nawaz as Zarqa, a divorced Muslim woman whose ex-husband is remarrying to a younger white yoga instructor; she responds by inventing a fake white boyfriend of her own and sets out to find an appropriate man to portray him as her date at the wedding, but ends up being drawn into a love triangle when Brian (Rob van Meenen), the man she finds on a dating app, wants to establish a serious relationship rather than just being revenge arm candy, while at the same time Zarqa's former boyfriend Yusuf (Rizwan Manji) returns with an interest in rekindling their relationship.

The series was inspired in part by the cultural and media response to the 2017 romantic comedy film The Big Sick, which centred on a relationship between a Muslim man and a white woman.

The cast also includes Husnain Sher, Krystle Pederson, Nimet Kanji, Anand Rajaram, Kris Alvarez, Darianne Galden, Gerald Lenton-Young, Sangeeta Gupta, Omar Alex Khan, Bonnie Senger, Danny Balkwill and Katie Murphy.

Production on the series was announced in 2021. It was shot in Regina, Saskatchewan, partially in Nawaz's own real-life home, in the fall, and premiered on CBC Gem on May 13, 2022.

== Episodes ==
No. overall	No. in season	Title	Directed by	Written by	Original release date
1	1	"Pilot"	Unknown	Unknown	May 13, 2022
2	2	"Welcome to the Show"	Unknown	Unknown	May 13, 2022
3	3	"Baby Jesus and the Donkey"	Unknown	Unknown	May 13, 2022
4	4	"Vagina Weights"	Unknown	Unknown	May 13, 2022
5	5	"Mehdni Madness"	Unknown	Unknown	May 13, 2022
6	6	"Season Finale"	Unknown	Unknown	May 13, 2022
