= An Optimist's Guide to the Planet =

British-Canadian television documentary series

An Optimist's Guide to the Planet is a British-Canadian television documentary series, which premiered in 2024 on Crave and Bloomberg Television. Hosted by actor Nikolaj Coster-Waldau, the series features Coster-Waldau travelling around the world to interview and highlight people who are working on innovative new solutions to the issue of climate change.

The series was produced by Cream Productions and Wildfire Television. In March 2025, it was announced that a second season of the series will enter production in spring 2025.

== Awards ==
Award	Date of ceremony	Category	Recipient(s)	Result	Ref.
Canadian Screen Awards	2025	Rob Stewart Award	Nikolaj Coster-Waldau, Philip Clarke, Jennifer Baichwal, Nicholas de Pencier, David W. Brady, Kate Harrison Karman, Joe Derrick, Patrick Cameron	Won	
Canadian Screen Awards	2025	Best Photography in a Documentary or Factual Program or Series	John Minh Tran	Nominated	
Canadian Screen Awards	2025	Best Sound in a Documentary or Factual Program or Series	Michael Bonini, Brian Eimer, Dylan Broda	Nominated	
