= Who Killed WCW? =

2024 American television series

- Official release poster
- Genre: Documentary
- Countries of origin: United States; Canada
- Original language: English
- No. of seasons: 1
- No. of episodes: 4 (list of episodes)

Production
- Production companies: Seven Bucks Productions; Vice Studios Canada

Original release
- Network: Vice TV; Crave
- Release: June 4 – June 26, 2024

Who Killed WCW? is a Canadian-American documentary television series produced by Vice Studios Canada and Seven Bucks Productions. The series premiered on June 6, 2024 in the United States on Vice TV, and in Canada on Crave.

== Synopsis ==
The series explores the downfall of World Championship Wrestling (WCW), interviewing various wrestlers, staff members and exploring the Monday Night War and the eventual demise and purchase by WWE.

The series features interviews with The Rock, Goldberg, Eric Bischoff, Bret Hart, Booker T, Konnan amongst others. Chris Jericho declined to appear based on his view that as the narrator for Dark Side of the Ring, he was too closely associated with the producers.

== Episode list ==
No.	Title	Original release date	Viewers	Rating (18–49)
1	"Where The Big Boys Play"	June 4, 2024	138,000	0.03
Eric Bischoff is given control of WCW, working with Hulk Hogan to create a rival to the WWF during the 1990s.
2	"The Streak Is Over"	June 11, 2024	117,000	0.02
With WCW taking the lead against the WWF, the biggest stars begin to put their own interests and egos before the needs of the business.
3	"New Blood"	June 18, 2024	148,000	0.06
With the downward spiral of the company continuing, Vince Russo is brought onboard to help reinvent the product.
4	"The Final Nitro"	June 26, 2024	124,000	0.05
The cast gather for the last episode of Nitro after WCW falls victim to the AOL-Time Warner merger.

== Reception ==
The series received criticism from a number of former WCW employees, including Tony Schiavone. Episodes 2 and 3 were criticised by Wrestling Observer Newsletter for poor fact-checking, lack of critique and a lack of pushback against narratives pushed by the featured talking heads. In particular, the narrative that WCW was ultimately driven down by Time Warner management rather than poor internal decisions by WCW itself was criticised.
