= Zoe Leigh Hopkins =

Canadian filmmaker, writer and actor

Zoe Leigh Hopkins is a Canadian Heiltsuk/Mohawk writer and film director who began her career in acting in 1991 and later pursued filmmaking.

== Biography ==
The daughter of journalist Brian Maracle, Hopkins was born in British Columbia, in the Heiltsuk fishing village. She is a fluent speaker of the Mohawk language. She started working in film at the age of 15 as an actor in the film Black Robe (1991). She attended Ryerson University and received a Bachelor of Applied Arts in film in 1997. She then went on to work as an independent filmmaker directing her first short film Prayer for a Good Day (2004) starring; Christina Bomberry, Taysha Fuller and Delmor Jacobs, which premiered at the Sundance Film Festival. Hopkins is also a part of the Embargo Collective, which is a group of seven Indigenous film makers from around the world who collaborate and challenge each other to create new, unusual films. She was selected by the ImagineNATIVE Film + Media Arts Festival to join this group. The majority of her films are short films; however, she is transitioning to feature-length. Her feature film Running Home is currently in production after being selected by Telefilm Canada as one of the four projects to receive financial support in partnership with the ImagineNATIVE Film & Media Arts Festival.

== The Embargo Collective ==
The Embargo Collective has happened twice. In both instances of the program Zoe Leigh Hopkins has been an active member and participant. The second Embargo Collective, named Embargo Collective II, was started due to the major success of the first Embargo Collective. The goal of this program is to provide more opportunities for Indigenous film making and collaboration within the industry of film. The program pairs both established and up and coming Aboriginal film makers together to create new and interesting short films.

== Filmography ==
| Production | Role | Year |
|---|---|---|
| Black Robe | Actor | 1991 |
| Prayer for a Good Day | Director, writer, producer | 2004 |
| One-Eyed Dogs Are Free | Director, writer, producer | 2006 |
| Tsi tkahéhtayen (The Garden) | Director, writer, producer | 2009 |
| Our First Voices | Director, writer | 2010 |
| Button Blanket | Director, writer | 2010 |
| Mohawk Midnight Runners | Director, writer, producer | 2013 |
| The Embargo Project | Director | 2015 |
| Kayak to Klemtu | Director, writer | 2018 |
| Run Woman Run | Director, writer | 2021 |
| Little Bird | Director | 2023 |
| Don't Even | Director | 2024 |
| North of North | Director of episode 6 | 2025 |

== Awards ==
Hopkin's short Tsi tkahétayen (The Garden) received the NSI Online Festival's A&e Short Filmmaker's Award. Additionally, Hopkins was the winner of the #TIFFStarWars contest for her submission "Star Wars - Trash Compactor Scene", a short which recreated the scene from the original film in the Mohawk language. Her short Mohawk Midnight Runners received accolades at the NSI Online Film Festival, imagineNATIVE, SWAIA Class X, Dawson City International Short Film Festival, Yellowknife International Film Festival and the Niagara Integrated Film Festival including Best Canadian Short Drama at imagineNATIVE 2013.

In 2017, Hopkins won the Audience Choice award at imagineNATIVE for Kayak to Klemtu.

Her 2021 film Run Woman Run won the Moon Jury Award at imagineNATIVE, as well as the awards for Best Feature Film, Best Screenplay and Best Performance for its lead actress Dakota Ray Hebert at the 2022 Vancouver International Women in Film Festival.
