= Dark Side of the Ring =

Canadian documentary television series on professional wrestling

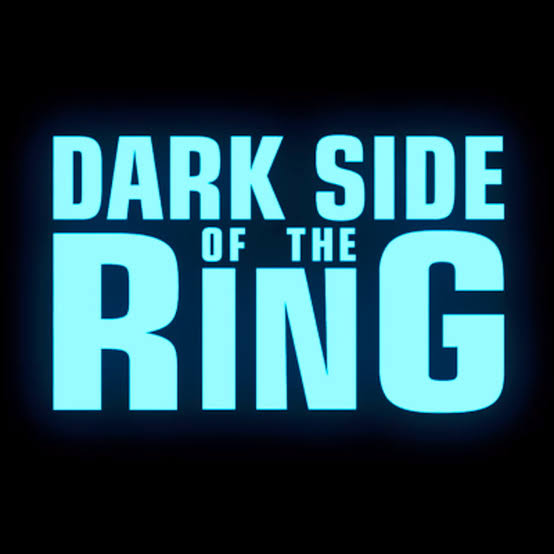
- Genre: Professional wrestling Documentary
- Created by: Evan Husney; Jason Eisener
- Directed by: Jason Eisener
- Narrated by: Dutch Mantel (season 1, episodes 1–2 and 4–6); Mick Foley (season 1, episode 3); Chris Jericho (season 2–present)
- Composers: Wade MacNeil; Andrew Gordon Macpherson
- Country of origin: Canada
- Original language: English
- No. of seasons: 7
- No. of episodes: 69

Production
- Executive producers: Chris Grosso; Evan Husney; Jason Eisener
- Producer: Various
- Running time: 60 min.
- Production company: Vice Studios Canada

Original release
- Network: Vice; Crave
- Release: April 10, 2019 – present

Dark Side of the Ring is a Canadian documentary television series produced by Vice Studios Canada. It premiered on April 10, 2019, on Vice TV in the United States, and it airs in Canada on Crave's streaming and TV network.

The show focuses primarily on dark and often untold stories from the world of professional wrestling and is known for its research, interviews with key figures, and its re-enactments of the events described. Each episode delves into a specific topic or event from the history of pro wrestling, with a particular emphasis on stories involving scandal, tragedy, or controversy.

== Episodes ==
=== Overview ===
Season	Episodes	Originally released	
Season	Episodes	First released	Last released
1	6	April 10, 2019	May 15, 2019
2	10	March 24, 2020	May 19, 2020
3	14	May 6, 2021	October 28, 2021
4	10	May 30, 2023	August 8, 2023
5	10	March 5, 2024	May 7, 2024
6	10	March 25, 2025	May 27, 2025
7	9	July 7, 2026	August 25, 2026

=== Season 1 (2019) ===
No. overall	No. in season	Title	Subject(s)	Original release date	Viewers (millions)
1	1	"The Match Made in Heaven"	Randy Savage and Miss Elizabeth	April 10, 2019	0.154
2	2	"The Montreal Screwjob"	Bret Hart, Shawn Michaels, and The Montreal Screwjob	April 17, 2019	0.181
3	3	"The Killing of Bruiser Brody"	Bruiser Brody	April 24, 2019	0.214
4	4	"The Last of the Von Erichs"	Von Erich family	May 1, 2019	0.225
5	5	"The Mysterious Death of Gorgeous Gino"	Gino Hernandez	May 8, 2019	0.234
6	6	"The Fabulous Moolah"	The Fabulous Moolah	May 15, 2019	0.200

=== Season 2 (2020) ===
No. overall	No. in season	Title	Subject(s)	Original release date	Viewers (millions)
7	1	"Benoit Part One"	Chris & Nancy Benoit, and Eddie Guerrero	March 24, 2020	0.320
8	2	"Benoit Part Two"	Chris Benoit murder–suicide	March 24, 2020	0.320
9	3	"The Life and Crimes of New Jack"	New Jack	March 31, 2020	0.229
10	4	"The Brawl for All"	WWF Brawl for All	April 7, 2020	0.226
11	5	"Jimmy Snuka and The Death of Nancy Argentino"	Jimmy Snuka	April 14, 2020	0.209
12	6	"The Assassination of Dino Bravo"	Dino Bravo	April 21, 2020	0.221
13	7	"David Schultz & The Slap Heard Round the World"	David Schultz, John Stossel, and kayfabe	April 28, 2020	0.255
14	8	"Cocaine & Cowboy Boots: The Herb Abrams Story"	Herb Abrams and UWF	May 5, 2020	0.246
15	9	"The Last Ride of The Road Warriors"	The Road Warriors (Road Warrior Animal & Road Warrior Hawk)	May 12, 2020	0.264
16	10	"The Final Days of Owen Hart"	Owen Hart accident	May 19, 2020	0.349

=== Season 3 (2021) ===
No. overall	No. in season	Title	Subject(s)	Original release date	Viewers (millions)
17	1	"Brian Pillman Part One"	Brian Pillman	May 6, 2021	0.272
18	2	"Brian Pillman Part Two"	Brian Pillman	May 6, 2021	0.272
19	3	"The Ultra-Violence of Nick Gage"	Nick Gage	May 13, 2021	0.163
20	4	"Collision in Korea"	Collision in Korea	May 20, 2021	0.191
21	5	"Becoming Warrior"	The Ultimate Warrior	May 27, 2021	0.165
22	6	"In the Shadow of Grizzly Smith"	Grizzly Smith, Jake Roberts, Sam Houston, and Rockin' Robin	June 3, 2021	0.243
23	7	"The Dynamite Kid"	Dynamite Kid	June 10, 2021	0.242
24	8	"The Plane Ride from Hell"	Plane Ride from Hell	September 16, 2021	0.153
25	9	"The Double Life of Chris Kanyon"	Chris Kanyon	September 23, 2021	0.214
26	10	"Blood & Wire: Onita's FMW"	Frontier Martial-Arts Wrestling	September 30, 2021	0.126
27	11	"Bikers, Bombs & Bedlam: Johnny K-9"	Johnny K-9/Bruiser Bedlam	October 7, 2021	0.137
28	12	"The Many Faces of Luna Vachon"	Luna Vachon	October 14, 2021	0.135
29	13	"Extreme & Obscene: Rob Black's XPW"	Rob Black and Xtreme Pro Wrestling	October 21, 2021	0.109
30	14	"The Steroid Trials"	United States v. McMahon	October 28, 2021	0.154

=== Season 4 (2023) ===
No. overall	No. in season	Title	Subject(s)	Original release date	Viewers (millions)
31	1	"Chris and Tammy"	Chris Candido and Tammy Lynn Sytch	May 30, 2023	0.147
32	2	"Shattered: The Magnum T.A. Story"	Magnum T. A.	June 6, 2023	0.155
33	3	"Breaking the Cycle: The Graham Dynasty"	Eddie Graham and Mike Graham	June 13, 2023	0.197
34	4	"What Happened to Doink the Clown?"	The original Doink the Clown, played by Matt Borne	June 20, 2023	0.201
35	5	"The Junkyard Dog"	Junkyard Dog	June 27, 2023	0.229
36	6	"The Tragic Fall of Adrian Adonis"	Adrian Adonis	July 11, 2023	0.152
37	7	"Abdullah the Butcher: Legacy of Blood"	Abdullah the Butcher	July 18, 2023	0.178
38	8	"Bam Bam Bigelow: The Beast from the East"	Bam Bam Bigelow	July 25, 2023	0.185
39	9	"Bash at the Beach 2000"	The backstage dispute between Vince Russo and Hulk Hogan at Bash at the Beach (2000)	August 1, 2023	0.158
40	10	"The World According to Marty Jannetty"	Marty Jannetty	August 8, 2023	0.115

=== Season 5 (2024) ===
No. overall	No. in season	Title	Subject(s)	Original release date	Viewers (millions)
41	1	"The Ballad of 'Earthquake' John Tenta"	Earthquake	March 5, 2024	N/A
42	2	"Buff and the Bagwells"	Buff Bagwell	March 12, 2024	N/A
43	3	"Terry Gordy: Final Flight of the Freebird"	Terry Gordy	March 19, 2024	N/A
44	4	"Saving Face: The Brutus Beefcake Story"	Brutus Beefcake	March 26, 2024	N/A
45	5	"The Life and Legends of Harley Race"	Harley Race	April 2, 2024	N/A
46	6	"Welcome to My Nightmare: The Chris Colt Story"	Chris Colt	April 9, 2024	N/A
47	7	"Chris Adams: The Gentleman and the Demon"	Chris Adams	April 16, 2024	N/A
48	8	"Sensational Sherri"	Sherri Martel	April 23, 2024	N/A
49	9	"Enter Sandman: Legacy of a Hardcore Icon"	The Sandman	April 30, 2024	N/A
50	10	"Black Saturday: The Rise of Vince"	Black Saturday	May 7, 2024	N/A

=== Season 6 (2025) ===
No. overall	No. in season	Title	Subject(s)	Original release date	Viewers (millions)
51	1	"Mick Foley: Hell in a Cell"	Mankind vs. The Undertaker	March 25, 2025	N/A
52	2	"Ludvig Borga: Hellraiser From Helsinki"	Ludvig Borga	April 1, 2025	N/A
53	3	"Big Van Vader"	Big Van Vader	April 8, 2025	N/A
54	4	"Tony Atlas: Too Much, Too Soon"	Tony Atlas	April 15, 2025	N/A
55	5	"The Original ‘Superstar': Billy Graham"	"Superstar" Billy Graham	April 22, 2025	N/A
56	6	"‘Hot Stuff’ Eddie Gilbert"	Eddie Gilbert	April 29, 2025	N/A
57	7	"Truth, Lies and Billy Jack Haynes"	Billy Jack Haynes	May 6, 2025	N/A
58	8	"Blood, Fire and the Original Sheik"	The Original Sheik	May 13, 2025	N/A
59	9	"The Scream Queen: Daffney"	Daffney	May 20, 2025	N/A
60	10	"Becoming Muhammad Hassan"	Muhammad Hassan	May 27, 2025	N/A

=== Season 7 (2026) ===
No. overall	No. in season	Title	Subject(s)	Original release date	Viewers (millions)
61	1	"Jeff Jarrett & the Battle for TNA – Part I"	Jeff Jarrett's TNA	July 7, 2026	N/A
62	2	"Jeff Jarrett & the Battle for TNA – Part II"	Jeff Jarrett's TNA	July 7, 2026	N/A
63	3	"Jeff Jarrett & the Battle for TNA – Part III"	Jeff Jarrett's TNA	July 14, 2026	N/A
64	4	"Necro Butcher vs. Samoa Joe"	Necro Butcher vs. Samoa Joe	July 21, 2026	N/A
65	5	"The Big Boss Man"	Big Boss Man	July 28, 2026	N/A
66	6	"Ultimate Fantasy: The Fall of Renegade"	The Renegade	August 4, 2026	N/A
67	7	"Paul Orndorff: Saving Mr. Wonderful"	Paul Orndorff	August 11, 2026	N/A
68	8	"The Walking Riot: Missy Hyatt"	Missy Hyatt	August 18, 2026	N/A
69	9	"Zach Gowen: Against All Odds"	Zach Gowen	August 25, 2026	N/A

== Production and release ==
The series premiered on Viceland on April 10, 2019.

On July 23, 2019, Dark Side of the Ring was renewed for a second season of 10 episodes, which premiered on March 24, 2020. Beginning with this season, the series became a co-production with Canadian broadcaster Bell Media for their Crave premium television and streaming service as part of their distribution pact with Vice. An aftershow hosted by Chris Gethard, Dark Side of the Ring: After Dark, was also added.

On October 19, 2020, Dark Side of the Ring was renewed for a third season of 14 episodes, which premiered on May 6, 2021. Vice TV aired a talk show titled Dark Side Of The Ring: Confidential on March 9, 2021 with Conrad Thompson talking to series creators Evan Husney and Jason Eisener in a roundtable discussions on the first two seasons with never-before-seen moments, unanswered questions and secrets uncovered and talking speaking guests about what happened.

A fourth season of ten episodes was announced on April 11, 2023, and premiered on May 30. The fifth season of ten episodes premiered on March 5, 2024. The sixth season premiered on March 25, 2025. The seventh season premiered on July 7, 2026.

== Reception ==
Dark Side of the Ring was Viceland's highest-rated series premiere among viewers in the key demographic. The first season won the Wrestling Observer Newsletter Award for Best Pro Wrestling DVD/Streaming Documentary of 2019.

The season 2 finale "The Final Days of Owen Hart" won the same award for 2020, and was the highest-rated program in Vice network history, at 626,000 viewers.

The two episodes on Brian Pillman won the award in 2021, and the episode "Chris and Tammy" won in 2023.

== Spin-offs ==
In December 2020, Vice ordered two spin-off series: Dark Side of Football and Dark Side of the 90s, which premiered on May 13 and July 15, 2021 respectively.

In 2022, the network ordered an additional spin-off Dark Side of Comedy.

In 2023, the network ordered Dark Side of the 2000s which premiered on July 18, 2023.

In 2026, a companion show titled Cornette Side of the Ring premiered September 27, airing on Sundays on Youtube in a shorter time-format and completely hosted by Jim Cornette. The series will premier on Vice TV on November 10.

== See also ==
- Beyond the Mat
- Biography: WWE Legends
- Bloodstained Memoirs
- Hitman Hart: Wrestling with Shadows
- Mr. McMahon
- The Self-Destruction of the Ultimate Warrior
- The Wrestler
- The Iron Claw
