= The Trades =

Canadian television series

The Trades is a Canadian comedy television series created by Ryan J. Lindsay that premiered on March 22, 2024, on Crave. Series creator Lindsay has called the series his "love letter" to the blue collar industrial culture of his hometown of Sarnia, Ontario. The series stars Robb Wells as Todd, a red seal welder working for the oil refining company Conch Industries who aspires to be promoted to site manager after current manager Bennett's (Tom Green) chaotic lifestyle causes disruption, but is passed over in favour of Chelsea (Jennifer Spence), an ambitious executive from head office. Meanwhile, Todd's sister Audrey (Anastasia Phillips) is facing hurdles in her goal of working for the company as a carpenter. The series also stars Patrick McKenna as Rod, Todd and Audrey's father, with the supporting cast including Enrico Colantoni, Jason Daley, Jesse Camacho, Dan Petronijevic, Brandon Oakes, Raoul Bhaneja, Eugene Sampang, Jennifer Irwin, Jonni Shreve, Koumbie, Lindsay Watters, Gil Anderson, Patrick Roach, Jordan Talbot and Susan Kent.

A production of Trailer Park Boys Inc. and Kontent House, the series entered production in Nova Scotia in 2023. All eight episodes were directed by Warren P. Sonoda.

The series was canceled after three seasons on June 4, 2026.

== Episodes ==
Season 1 Episodes
No.	Title	Original air date
1	"The German Robot"	March 27, 2024
2	"The New Boss"	March 27, 2024
3	"Sensitivity Training"	March 31, 2024
4	"The Labour Day Parade"	March 31, 2024
5	"Medhi is Partied Out"	April 5, 2024
6	"The Golf Tourney"	April 5, 2024
7	"The Piss Test"	April 12, 2024
8	"Just the (Flare) Tip"	April 12, 2024

Season 2 Episodes
No.	Title	Original air date
1	"Laying Pipe"	March 16, 2025
2	"Permittees"	March 16, 2025
3	"Family Work Party"	March 23, 2025
4	"Night Shift"	March 23, 2025
5	"Career Day"	March 30, 2025
6	"Total Eclipse of the Taze"	March 30, 2025
7	"Softball Finals"	April 6, 2025
8	"Jimi's Retirement"	April 6, 2025

Season 3 Episodes
No.	Title	Original air date
1	"The Layoff"	____
2	"Take Your Nepo Boss to Work Day"	____
3	"Heat Day"	____
4	"Hardhat Hotties"	____
5	"Bitch Box"	____
6	"Meat Sweats"	____
7	"Sibling Rivalry"	____
8	"Float Down"	____
