= Don't Even =

- Created by: Amber-Sekowan Daniels
- Directed by: Zoe Hopkins
- Starring: Leenah Robinson; Victoria Gwendoline
- Country of origin: Canada

Original release
- Network: Crave
- Release: August 23 – September 8, 2024

Don't Even is a Canadian comedy television series, which premiered on Crave on August 23, 2024. The series stars Leenah Robinson and Victoria Gwendoline as Violet and Harley, two young First Nations women in Winnipeg who are figuring out their next steps in life during the summer immediately after graduating high school.

The cast also includes Dylan McEwan, Joel Oulette, Gail Maurice, Jennifer Podemski, Curtis Howson, Tess Ray Houston, Marion Jacobs, Sophia Smoke, Chandler Ginter, and Matthew Lupu.

Created by Amber-Sekowan Daniels and directed by Zoe Hopkins, the series went into production in Winnipeg in July 2023. In addition to its pay television and streaming broadcast on Crave, it is also slated to be broadcast on APTN later in the year.

== Cast ==
- Leenah Robinson as Violet
- Victoria Gwendoline as Harley
- Dylan McEwan as Jay
- Joel Oulette as Wesley
- Tess Ray Houston as Cousin Cheryl(credited as Tess Houston)
- Marion Jacobs as Showboat
- Sophia Smoke as Mickie Carp
- Jennifer Podemski as Shelly
- Chandler Ginter as Woody
- Gail Maurice as Wanda
- Jason Burnstick as The Fox
- Matthew Lupu as Tyler
- Reena Jolly as Stinky

== Episodes ==
1. Jerk Sandwich
2. Welcome to the Band Office
3. Skidmark, My Heart
4. Leave Mojo Out of It
5. Cut These Ponies Loose
6. Stinky and the Man's Battle of the Bands 1998
