= Gagan Singh =

Gagan Singh may refer to:

- Gagan Singh Bhandari, a 19th-century Nepalese military general,
- Gagan Singh (composer), a Canadian film score composer.
