= Jinder Mahal =

Canadian professional wrestler (born 1986)

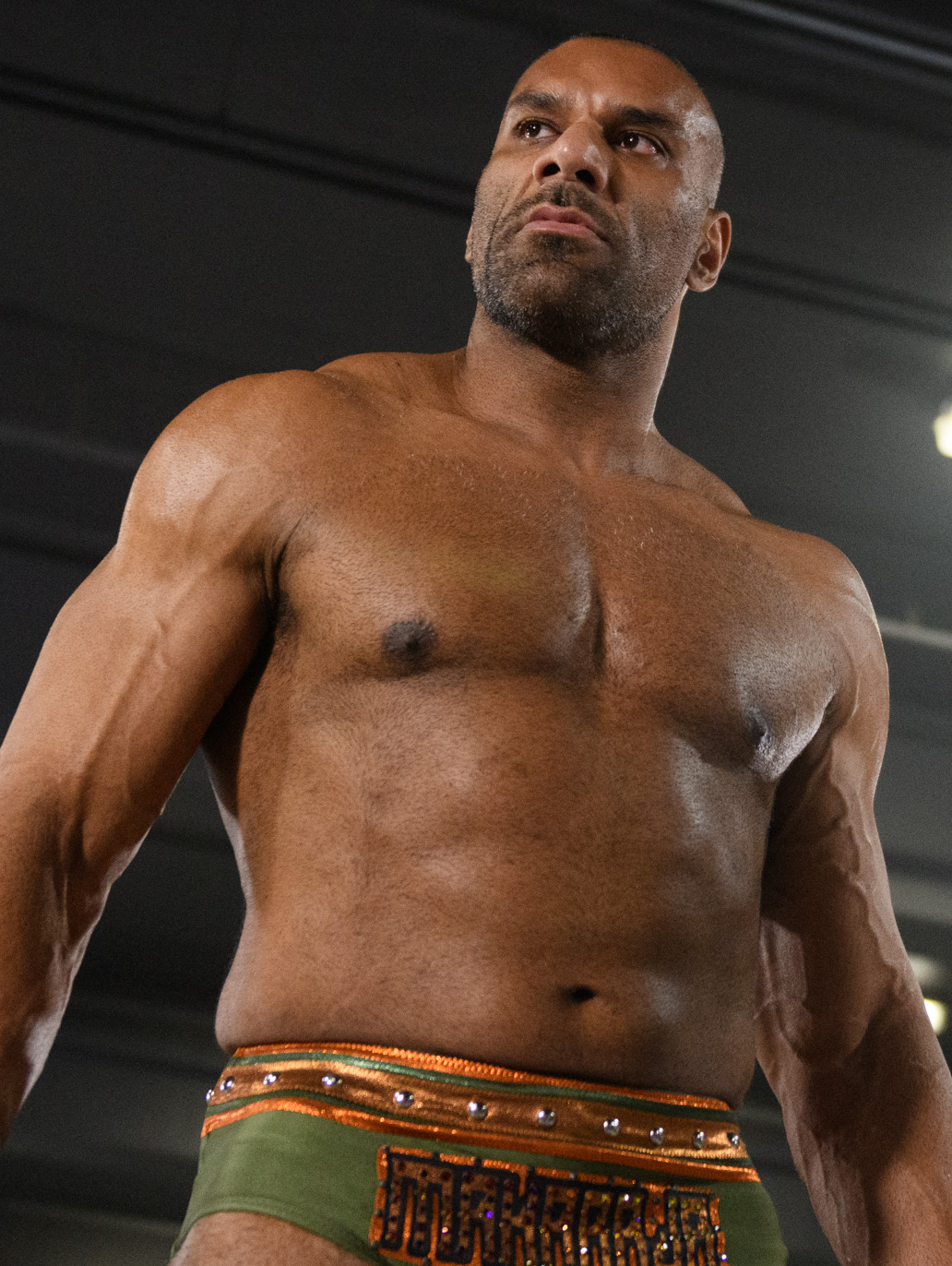
- Mahal in 2024

Personal information
- Born: Yuvraj Singh Dhesi; July 19, 1986 (age 40) Calgary, Alberta, Canada
- Relatives: Gama Singh (uncle); Raj Singh (cousin)

Professional wrestling career
- Ring name(s): Jinder Mahal; Raj Dhesi; Raj Singh; Raj the Maharaja; Tiger Raj Singh
- Billed height: 6 ft 5 in (196 cm)
- Billed weight: 238 lb (108 kg)
- Billed from: Punjab, India
- Trained by: Allen Coage; Gama Singh; Gerry Morrow; Rick Bognar
- Debut: December 27, 2004

Yuvraj Singh Dhesi (born July 19, 1986) is a Canadian professional wrestler. He currently performs on the independent circuit under his real name, stylized as Raj Dhesi. He is best known for his tenures in WWE, where he performed under the ring name Jinder Mahal and is a former one-time WWE Champion, WWE United States Champion, and two-time WWE 24/7 Champion.

Having started his career on the independent circuit, Dhesi joined WWE in 2010 and made his debut as Jinder Mahal on the company's main roster the following year. After a short-lived alliance with his kayfabe brother-in-law The Great Khali, he formed the stable 3MB with fellow wrestlers Heath Slater and Drew McIntyre, before he and McIntyre were released from the company in 2014. He returned to WWE in 2016 with a drastically improved physique and received a push in 2017, culminating in him becoming the 50th WWE Champion and the first of Indian descent.

== Early life ==
Yuvraj Singh Dhesi was born in Calgary on July 19, 1986. He is of Indian (Punjabi) Sikh descent. He holds a business degree in communications and culture from the University of Calgary. His uncle, Gama Singh, was considered a legendary wrestling villain in the original Stampede Wrestling and wrestled around the world (and briefly for the WWF, now WWE) in the 1980s.

== Professional wrestling career ==
=== Early career (2002–2010) ===
Growing up in a wrestling family, Dhesi began his professional wrestling career at the Martial Arts Fitness Center in Calgary, training with Rick Bognar. He debuted in Premier Martial Arts Wrestling (PMW) as "Raj Dhesi" and then went on to train with Allen Coage and Gerry Morrow, wrestling in a revived Stampede Wrestling alongside fellow future WWE wrestlers Natalya, Tyson Kidd, and Viktor. As "Tiger Raj Singh", he won various tag team championships in Stampede and Prairie Wrestling Alliance (PWA), spending much of his early career teaming with his cousin Gama Singh Jr. They were known as The New Karachi Vice and also as Sikh & Destroy, winning the PWA Canadian Tag Team Championship. In PWA, he was the PWA Heavyweight Champion from 2008 until January 2010 and also spent time in Great North Wrestling (GNW), where he feuded with wrestlers such as Hannibal and Samoa Joe.

=== World Wrestling Entertainment / WWE (2010–2014) ===
==== Florida Championship Wrestling (2010–2011) ====
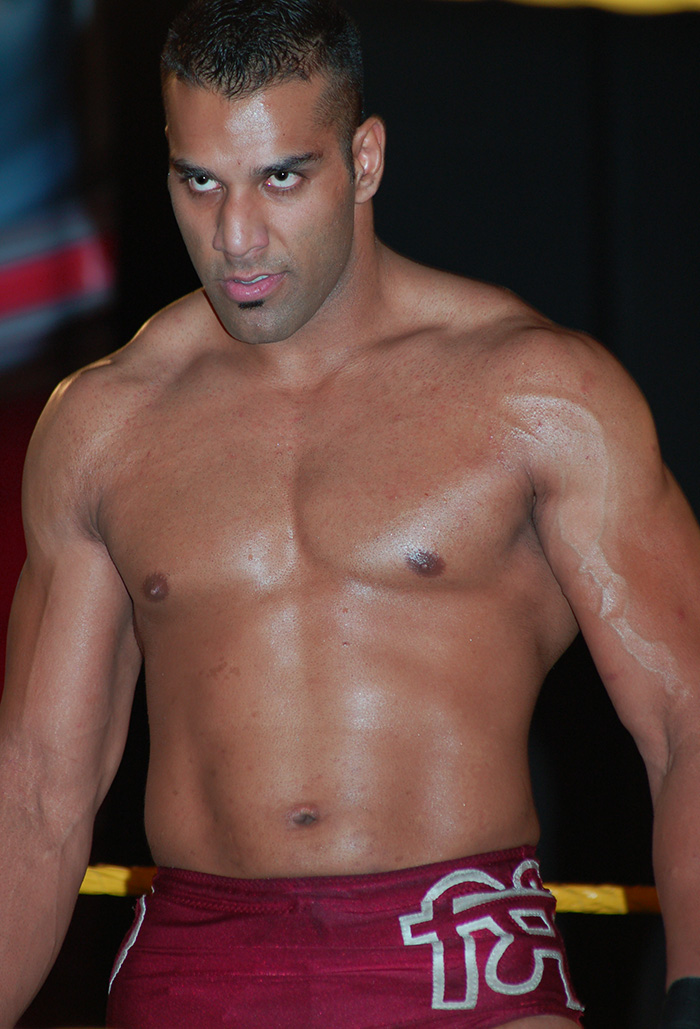
Mahal in February 2011

Dhesi tried out for WWE's developmental promotion Florida Championship Wrestling (FCW). At the tryout, he believed that his Punjabi gimmick and promos made him stand out, stating that he "came out wearing a turban and had [his] full outfit on" and that "they like guys who speak different languages and have different looks". In February 2010, he signed to a developmental contract with FCW under the ring name Jinder Mahal and wrestled there for a year.

==== Early feuds (2011–2012) ====
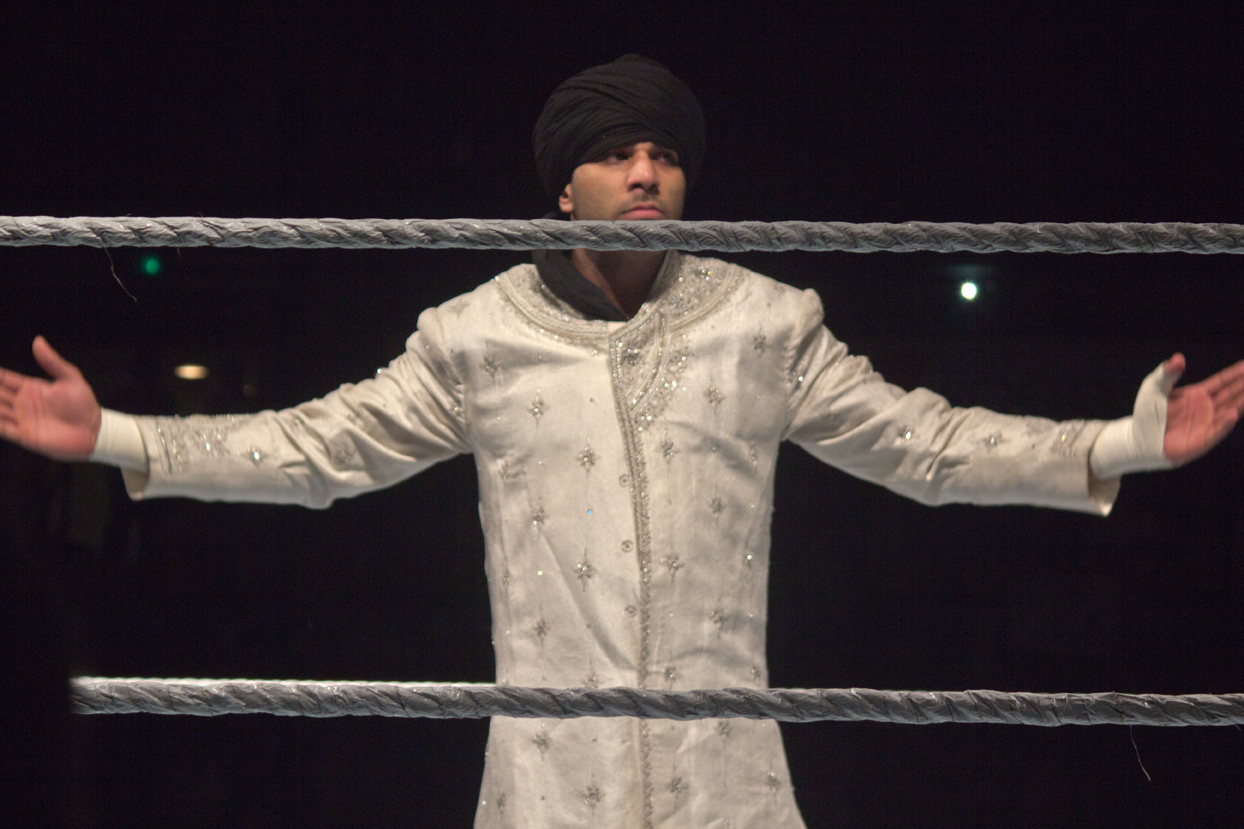
As part of his first villain character, Mahal began wearing his signature pre-match attire

Mahal made his televised WWE debut on the April 29, 2011, episode of SmackDown, greeting backstage fellow Indian wrestler The Great Khali and his manager Ranjin Singh by speaking in Punjabi that he was really happy and excited to see Khali and Ranjin. The next week on SmackDown, Mahal, unimpressed by how Khali and Singh have been partaking in childish activities instead of winning matches, confronted Singh about his mismanagement of Khali, establishing himself as a heel. Mahal interrupted a Khali Kiss Cam segment the following week on SmackDown, slapping Khali twice. On the May 20 episode of SmackDown, Mahal interrupted Khali's match against Jey Uso, leading to Khali confronting Mahal. On his first televised match on the June 17 episode of SmackDown, Mahal defeated Vladimir Kozlov and on the July 1 episode of SmackDown it was revealed that Mahal was married to Khali's sister, making them (kayfabe) brothers-in-law. On the September 5 episode of Raw, he suffered his first loss when he and Khali lost to WWE Tag Team Champions Evan Bourne and Kofi Kingston in a non-title match. In a rematch on SmackDown, they lost again to Bourne and Kingston, leading Khali to walk away from Mahal after the match, thus ending their alliance. On the September 16 episode of SmackDown, Mahal attacked Khali during his match with Heath Slater which Khali won by disqualification. On the September 23 episode of SmackDown, Mahal suffered his first loss in a singles match to Khali. On the October 14 episode of SmackDown, Mahal competed in a 41-man battle royal and Mahal made it to the final three before being eliminated by Randy Orton.

In November, Mahal targeted wrestlers whom he deemed as beneath him or embarrassing and in November began a feud with Ted DiBiase. On the December 30 episode of Smackdown, Mahal broke DiBiase's winning streak via submission to end their feud. In December, Mahal tried to make a name for himself and went after Sheamus, constantly disrespecting him, but was defeated and for several months they were involved in multiple matches, with Sheamus always getting the best of Mahal. At Mahal's first Royal Rumble on January 29, 2012, he was eliminated by The Great Khali, rekindling their feud and leading to a match on the February 3 episode of SmackDown, which Mahal lost. At Over the Limit on May 20, Mahal participated in and lost a battle royal match where the winner was to receive a shot at the Intercontinental Championship or the United States Championship when he was again eliminated by The Great Khali.

In late April, Mahal began confronting several wrestlers, starting with Randy Orton, interrupting one of his promos and being attacked in retaliation with an RKO. On July 23 at Raw 1000, Mahal confronted Kane, leading a group consisting of Camacho, Curt Hawkins, Drew McIntyre, Hunico and Tyler Reks and claiming none of them had been given an opportunity within WWE and would make one by taking down Kane, but The Undertaker's sudden appearance halted their advance and The Brothers of Destruction attacked the group and took them out. On the July 27 episode of SmackDown, Mahal lost to Ryback by countout and then began a feud with him, winning by intentional countout and disqualification. To try and prove himself to Ryback, Mahal requested a match against two local wrestlers in a match style similar to Ryback's, defeating them quickly by submission. In spite of this, Mahal continued his feud with Ryback, attacking him during their matches and after Ryback's, but was ultimately pinned by Ryback on the August 24 episode of SmackDown to end their feud.

When WWE rebranded its developmental territory FCW into NXT, Mahal began appearing on the rebooted NXT, where he started a winning streak by defeating several wrestlers, including Derrick Bateman and Percy Watson. On the August 8 episode of NXT, Mahal was inserted into the Gold Rush tournament to crown the first NXT Champion, where he defeated Bo Dallas in the first round. On the August 15 episode of NXT, Mahal defeated Richie Steamboat in the semi-finals of the Gold Rush Tournament. On the August 29 episode of NXT, Mahal was defeated by Seth Rollins in the finals of the Gold Rush Tournament, thus ending his NXT winning streak. At the Night of Champions pre-show on September 16, Mahal competed in the 16-man battle royal to become number one contender for the United States Championship, but was eliminated by Brodus Clay.

==== 3MB (2012–2014) ====
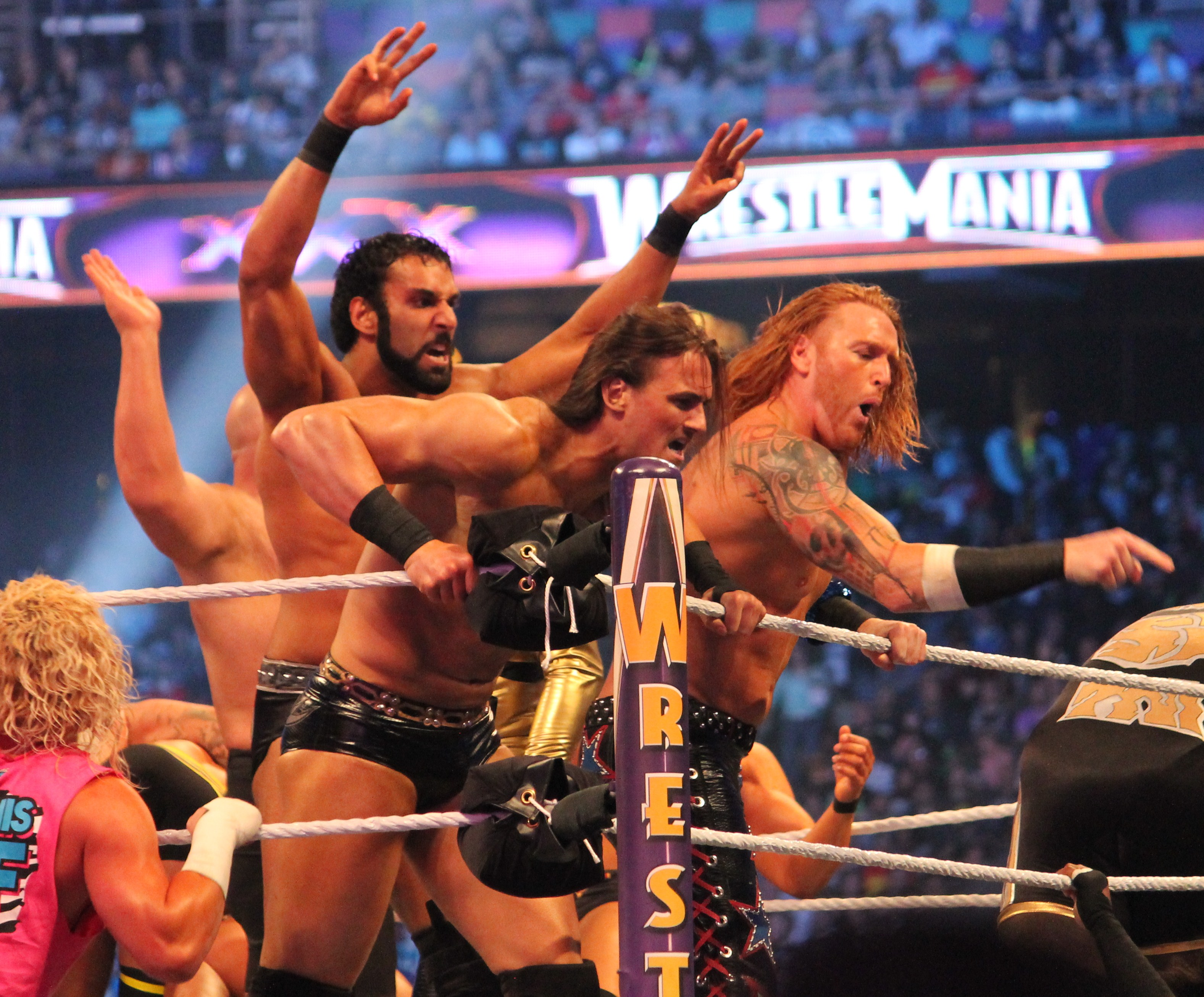
3MB – (Mahal (back), Drew McIntyre and Heath Slater) at WrestleMania XXX in April 2014

On the September 21 episode of SmackDown, Mahal and Drew McIntyre interfered in Heath Slater's match against Brodus Clay by attacking Clay. The alliance of Mahal, Slater and McIntyre were later named 3MB. From October 2012, 3MB racked up many wins against Team Co-Bro (Santino Marella and Zack Ryder) and The Usos (Jey and Jimmy Uso), all of them due to illegal interference. At the Survivor Series pre-show on November 18, Mahal and Slater defeated Marella and Ryder when Mahal pinned Ryder. At TLC: Tables, Ladders & Chairs on December 16, 3MB were defeated by the team of Alberto Del Rio, The Brooklyn Brawler and The Miz. The next night on Raw at the Slammy Awards show, 3MB lost to Del Rio, Miz and Tommy Dreamer. Mahal competed in the 30-man Royal Rumble match at the Royal Rumble on January 27, 2013, by entering at number 27, but was eliminated by Sheamus. On the April 12 episode of SmackDown, in an attempt to make a name for themselves, 3MB tried to attack Triple H, but were attacked themselves by The Shield (Dean Ambrose, Roman Reigns and Seth Rollins). On the April 15 episode of Raw, 3MB called out The Shield, only for Brock Lesnar to come out instead and attack the group. At the Night of Champions pre-show on September 15, 3MB (Drew McIntyre and Heath Slater) competed in a number one contenders tag team turmoil match for the WWE Tag Team Championship, in which they were the last team eliminated by Tons of Funk (Brodus Clay and Tensai).

In late 2013, 3MB began adopting new ring names against their opponents, although their misfortunes and amounting losses remained the same. At WrestleMania XXX on April 6, 2014, Mahal competed in the André the Giant Memorial battle royal, but was eliminated by Mark Henry. In April, 3MB formed an alliance with Hornswoggle to feud with Los Matadores (Diego and Fernando). On June 12, Mahal was released from his WWE contract.

=== Independent circuit (2014–2016) ===
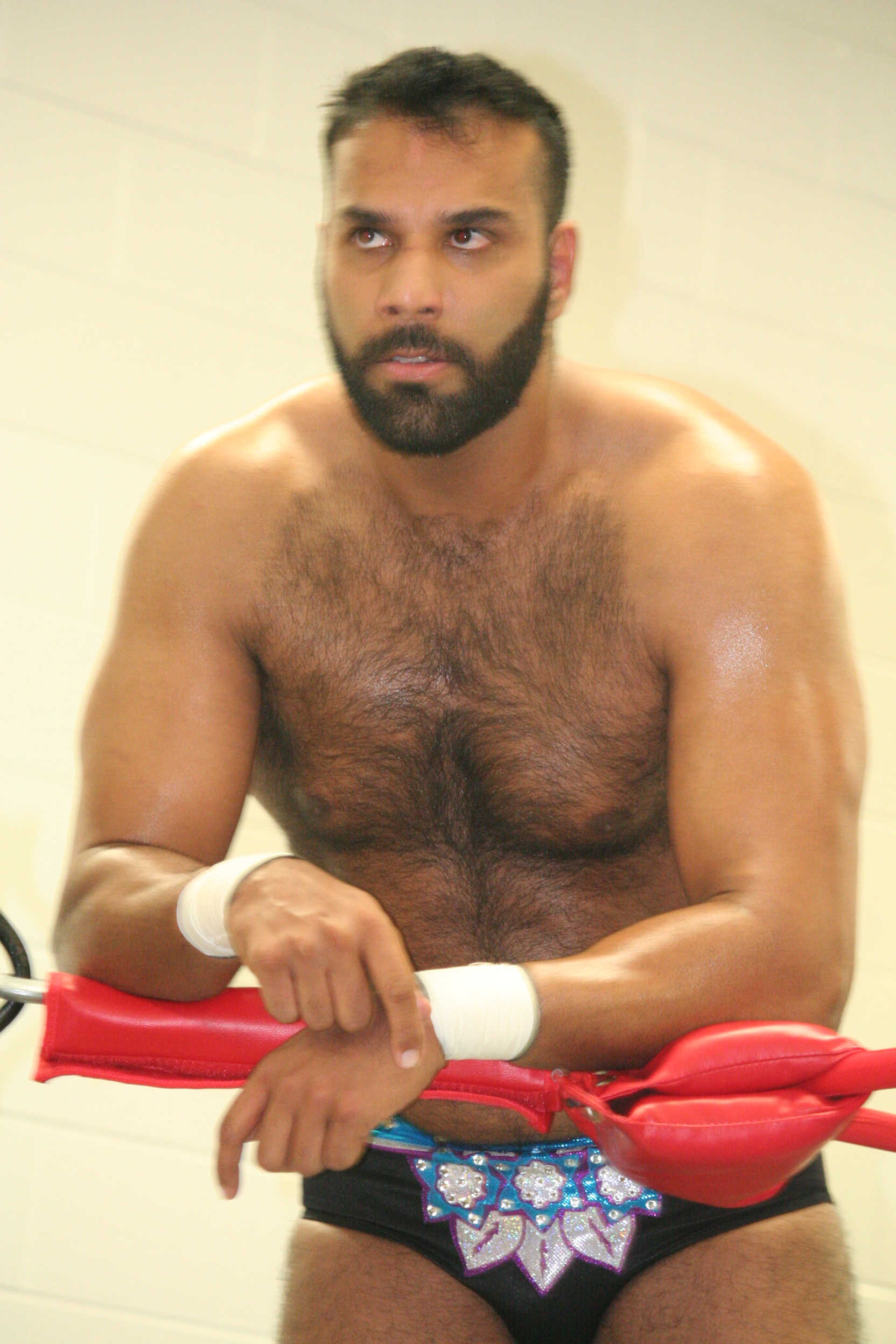
Dhesi as Raj Singh in 2015

Dhesi wrestled for Reality of Wrestling (ROW) under the name Raj Singh at their summer iPPV, ROW Summer of Champions 2014, defeating Jasper Davis. On October 24 at All Star Wrestling (ASW) in Vancouver, BC at the live event Fright Night Live, Singh teamed with his cousin Gama Singh Jr. to defeat Kyle Sebastian and Collin Cutler to win the ASW Tag Team Championship. Between 2014 and 2015, he appeared in Puerto Rican promotion the World Wrestling Council (WWC) against local star Ray González. He also participated in Qatar Pro Wrestling (QPW) Souq Waqif Championship tournament in April 2015, where he ended up as first runner up. On May 5, Singh made his debut for Japanese promotion Inoki Genome Federation (IGF), losing to Wang Bin. In 2016, he also wrestled for The Great Khali's wrestling promotion Continental Wrestling Entertainment (CWE) in India.

In a 2017 interview on Chris Jericho's Talk is Jericho podcast, Mahal revealed that he "hit rock bottom" during his time in the independent circuit. He also mentioned that he stopped drinking alcohol and began working out and eating cleaner, losing 20 pounds in the process, two months prior to WWE calling him to return.

=== Return to WWE (2016–2024) ===
==== The Man of Peace (2016–2017) ====
On July 27, Mahal re-signed with the WWE. On the August 1 episode of Raw, Mahal returned to television alongside Heath Slater, demanding contracts until Raw General Manager Mick Foley informed the pair that they had to face each other in a match for a Raw contract, which Mahal won. Throughout the rest of the month on Raw, Mahal began losing to the likes of Neville, Sami Zayn and Darren Young. Mahal then adopted the gimmick of a "man who comes in peace", advocating peace and tranquility. On the September 12 episode of Raw, Mahal stated that after he left WWE he "felt anger and rage" and had since "found inner peace" before defeating Jack Swagger. Afterwards, Mahal began competing on Main Event and Superstars, where he often traded wins and losses against Darren Young.

On the December 19 episode of Raw, a notably more lean and muscular Mahal began an alliance with Rusev after Mahal had a confrontation with Rusev's rival Enzo Amore before the two attacked Amore. On the January 2, 2017, episode of Raw, Mahal and Rusev defeated Amore's tag team partner Big Cass in a 2-on-1 handicap match. The following week on Raw, Mahal lost to Cass (who had Shawn Michaels at ringside) after Michaels performed the Sweet Chin Music on Rusev at ringside, which distracted Mahal. On the February 27 episode of Raw, Mahal and Rusev began to show tension after Rusev inadvertently distracted Mahal, causing the two to lose to The New Day (Big E, Kofi Kingston and Xavier Woods). The alliance between Mahal and Rusev ended at Fastlane on March 5, when Mahal informed Raw General Manager Mick Foley about his desire to return to singles competition, prompting Foley to place the duo in singles matches that night and with both Mahal and Rusev losing their respective matches against Cesaro and Big Show. This was done due to Rusev suffering a legit shoulder injury.

On April 3 at the WrestleMania 33 preshow, Mahal was the runner-up in the André the Giant Memorial Battle Royal, being eliminated last by Mojo Rawley after interference from Rob Gronkowski. On April 11, Mahal was moved to SmackDown as part of the Superstar Shake-up. On that night, he lost to Rawley after another interference from Gronkowski to end their feud.

==== WWE Champion (2017–2018) ====
Jinder is a guy who has always worked extremely hard. He trains hard; he's very intense about what he wants with his career; he's very thoughtful... to Jinder's credit and to Drew [McIntyre]'s credit, they left, they went and figured it for themselves, they improved. They're both men now as opposed to kids trying to make it in the business... now hopefully they are in a better position to succeed.

— Triple H in April 2017

On the April 18 episode of SmackDown Live, Mahal won a six-pack challenge to earn a title match for the WWE Championship after interference from Mahal's new allies, The Singh Brothers (Samir and Sunil Singh), defeating the champion Randy Orton at Backlash on May 21 to win the title, becoming the 50th recognized WWE Champion and the first of Indian descent. According to him, Mahal was included into the feud against Orton after Rusev suffered an injury and his title win took place because the company wanted a surprise. Mahal retained the title against Orton at Money in the Bank on June 18, and Battleground on July 23, the first in a singles match and the second in a Punjabi Prison match.

On the August 15 episode of SmackDown Live, Baron Corbin cashed in his Money in the Bank contract on Mahal, retaining the title after Corbin was distracted by John Cena. In the following weeks, he retained the WWE Championship against Shinsuke Nakamura at SummerSlam on August 20 and Hell in a Cell on October 8. On the October 17 episode of SmackDown Live, Mahal challenged Universal Champion Brock Lesnar to a match at Survivor Series on November 19, However, Mahal lost the WWE Championship to AJ Styles on the November 7 episode of SmackDown Live, ending his reign at 170 days. Mahal received his rematch for the title against Styles at Clash of Champions on December 17, but he lost by submission.

==== Other championship reigns and brand switches (2018–2020) ====
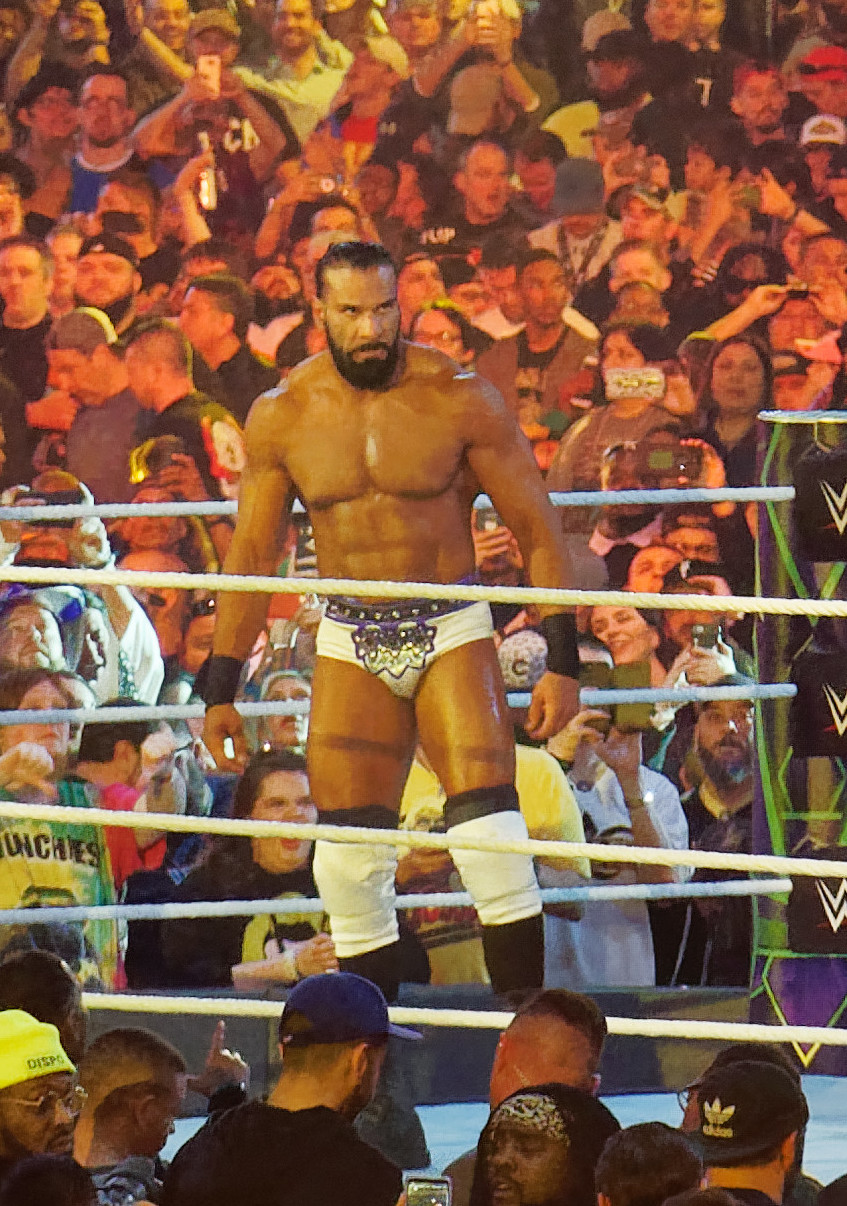
Mahal at WrestleMania 34

After dropping the WWE Championship, Mahal was quickly inserted into the United States Championship picture after he competed in an 8-man tournament to crown a new champion, losing against Robert Roode in the finals. At WrestleMania 34, Mahal won a Fatal 4 Way, including the champion Randy Orton, Rusev and Robert Roode to win the title. On April 16, as part of Superstar Shake-up, Mahal was traded back to Raw and lost the title to Jeff Hardy, ending his reign at just 8 days. On April 27 at Greatest Royal Rumble event Mahal couldn't win back the United States Championship from Hardy.

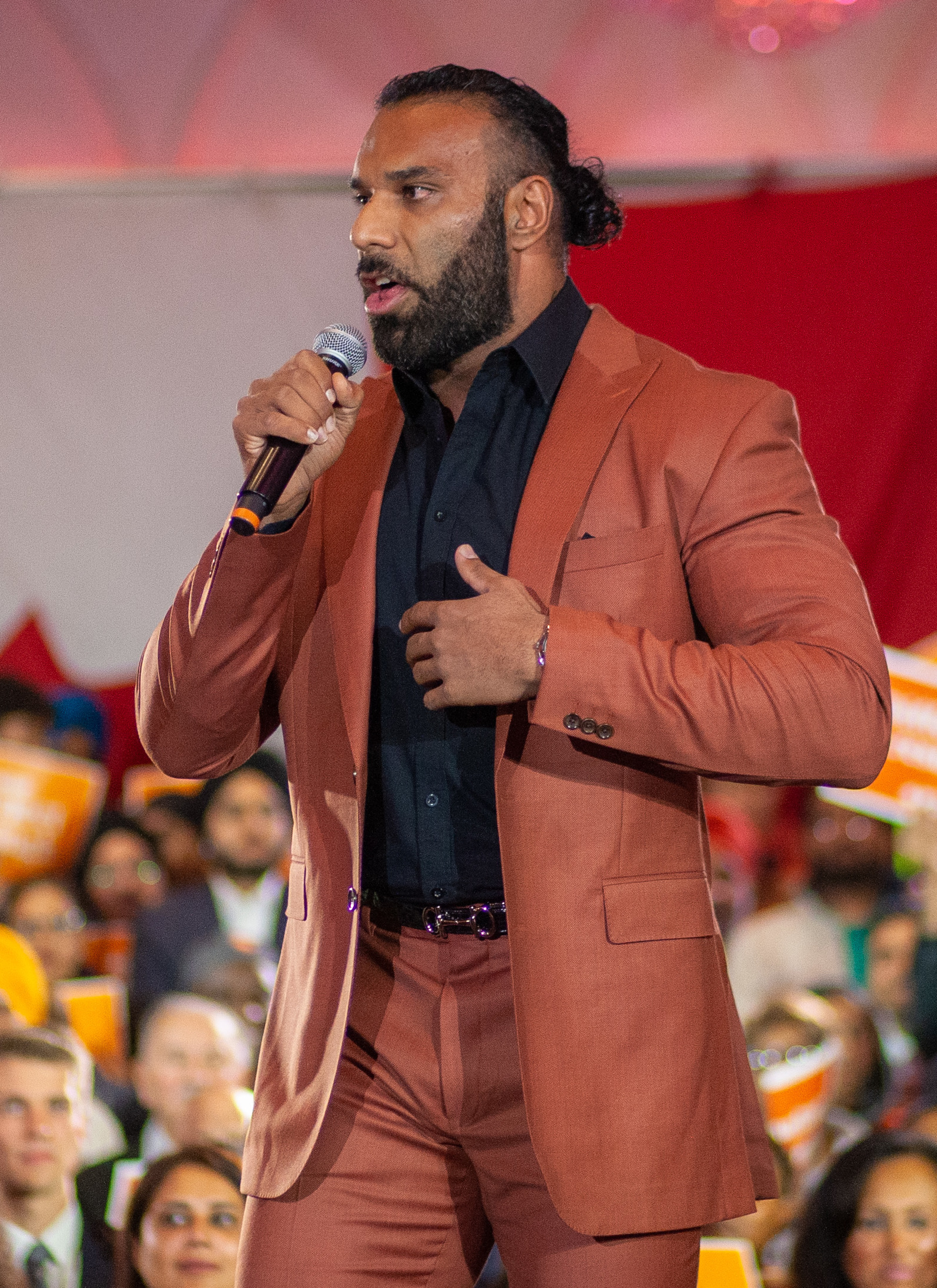
Mahal in 2019

On the May 7 episode of Raw, after defeating Chad Gable, Mahal was denied entry into the triple threat Money in the Bank qualifying match by General Manager Kurt Angle, which led to Mahal interfering and costing Roman Reigns the match later that night. The following week, Mahal was scheduled to compete in another triple threat Money in the Bank qualifying match against Bobby Lashley and Elias, but he was attacked by Reigns before the match. At Money in the Bank, Mahal lost to Reigns.

The night after on Raw, Mahal returned as the "man who comes in peace" and defeated Chad Gable. Starting in September, Mahal competed in the second iteration of the WWE Mixed Match Challenge, teaming with Alicia Fox, where they went 1-3 to make the Playoff round of the tournament and defeat the team of Apollo Crews and Bayley to advance to the finals. At the TLC PPV on December 16, Mahal & Fox lost the final to R-Truth & Carmella. In 2019, as part of Superstar Shake-up, Mahal was moved to the SmackDown brand, where he won the 24/7 Championship twice, 1 pinning champion R-Truth on a golf course, and, 4 days later, pinned R-Truth on an airport tarmac. On June 28, WWE reported that Mahal suffered a knee injury and it was reported that the injury would sideline him for 6 to 12 months. As part of the 2019 draft, Mahal was drafted to the Raw brand. While he returned on the April 27, 2020, show of Raw, a month later underwent another surgery to fix complications in his knee.

==== Various alliances (2021–2024) ====
After a nine-month absence, Mahal appeared at the Superstar Spectacle on January 26, 2021, reuniting with The Singh Brothers; they lost to Drew McIntyre and Indus Sher (Rinku & Saurav) in a 6-man tag team match. Mahal formed an alliance with Rinku (now known as Veer) & Shanky on the May 3 show of Main Event, where he defeated Jeff Hardy. In June, he began a feud with former 3MB teammate Drew McIntyre after Mahal questioned the amount of championship opportunities McIntyre had received over the past year. At Money in the Bank, Mahal interfered in the titular match, attacking McIntyre with Shanky and Veer carrying McIntyre away from the match. The following night on Raw, Mahal, Shanky, and Veer gloated about costing McIntyre the match only for McIntyre to attack all three with a steel chair. At SummerSlam, Mahal lost to McIntyre.

As part of the 2021 Draft, both Mahal and Shanky were drafted to SmackDown while Veer remained on Raw, ending their alliance with Veer. In October, Mahal entered the King of the Ring tournament, where he defeated Kofi Kingston in the first round, but lost to Xavier Woods in the semi-finals. At Survivor Series, Mahal would be a part of The Rock's 25th anniversary battle royal, but was eliminated. On the April 15, 2022, edition of SmackDown, Mahal would challenge Ricochet for the Intercontinental Championship but was unsuccessful. At New Year's Evil on January 10, 2023, Mahal returned to NXT for the first time since 2012, aligning himself with Indus Sher (Veer & Sanga) by attacking The Creed Brothers. On the February 21 show of NXT, he challenged Bron Breakker for the NXT Championship in a losing effort. As part of the 2023 WWE Draft, he returned to the main roster as Indus Sher was drafted to Raw as a team.

Prior to the special Day 1 show of Raw on January 1, 2024, rumours reported that a former WWE Champion would be appearing on the show. Mahal was revealed as the champion in question, to the dismay of the audience, and berated America as being divided while claiming that he'd unite it. Another former WWE Champion, Dwayne "The Rock" Johnson, would interrupt him in a surprise return for the first time since September, insulting Mahal before finally hitting his signature moves on him. 3 days later, Mahal challenged The Rock to a match in India during an interview with Sony Sports Network. The next week on Raw, Mahal confronted World Heavyweight Champion Seth "Freakin" Rollins and continued to present himself as a man who wanted a platform to tell the truth, while chastising Rollins for overlooking him as a worthy challenger. Mahal attacked Rollins after his rebuttal and the two brawled with him escaping from Rollins' attack, before Rollins accepted Mahal's challenge for a championship match on the January 15 episode of Raw, where Mahal lost to Rollins. On the WrestleMania edition of SmackDown, Mahal competed in the Andre the Giant Memorial Battle Royal, which he would lose. This marked his final appearance with WWE. On April 19, Mahal was released from WWE, ending his second tenure with the company.

=== Return to independent circuit (2024–present) ===
On June 5, 2024, it was announced that Dhesi (now reverting back to his Raj Dhesi name) would make his debut for Black Label Pro (BLP) on July 26. On July 19, Dhesi made his debut for Game Changer Wrestling (GCW), attacking Effy after his match. On October 19, Dhesi would make an appearance on Night 1 of Maple Leaf Pro Wrestling's Forged In Excellence event, losing to Bully Ray in a Tables match after interference from Q. T. Marshall. Dhesi would team with Bhupinder Gujjar against Bully Ray and Q.T. Marshall in a winning effort during Night 2 following a Gargoyle Spear by Gujjar.

== Other media ==
Dhesi, as Jinder Mahal, appears in the wrestling video games WWE '13, WWE 2K14, WWE 2K18, WWE 2K19, WWE 2K20, WWE 2K22, WWE 2K23, and WWE 2K24.

In October 2017, Dhesi appeared in an episode of Hindi-language sitcom Sajan Re Phir Jhooth Mat Bolo on Sony SAB.

In November 2021, Dhesi announced he was joining the cast of the ABC drama series Big Sky. He debuted on the 22nd episode ("Heart-shaped Charm") as Dhruv, the enforcer of Ren's brother Jag. Through April 7, 2022, he has appeared in 9 episodes of Big Sky.

He appears in Akash Sherman's documentary film Singhs in the Ring, which premiered at the 2025 Calgary International Film Festival. He also had an acting role in Ian Bawa's 2026 drama film Strong Son.

== Personal life ==
Dhesi resides in Tampa, Florida. He is fluent in English, Hindi, and Punjabi. He follows a straight edge lifestyle, which was called into question in 2017 after viewers noticed telltale signs of steroid use following his return to WWE with a drastically improved physique.

Dhesi is friends with mixed martial artist and fellow Indo-Canadian Arjan Bhullar. He is also good friends with fellow professional wrestlers Heath Slater and Drew McIntyre, with whom he previously formed the 3MB team.

In 2017, Canadian politician Graham Sucha tabled three documents before the province of Alberta's legislative assembly, formally congratulating Dhesi for winning the WWE Championship.

During the 2019 Canadian federal election, Dhesi endorsed Jagmeet Singh of the New Democratic Party for Prime Minister.

== Championships and accomplishments ==
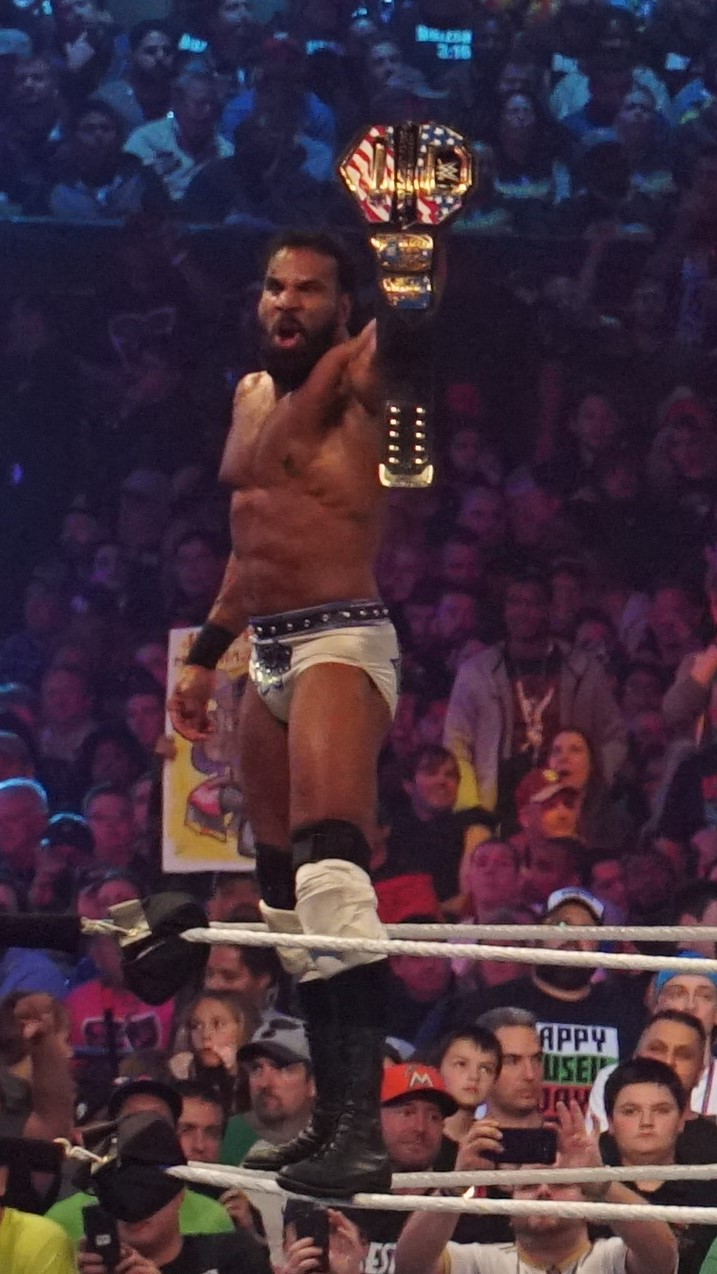
Mahal is a former one-time WWE United States Champion

- All-Star Wrestling
  - ASW Tag Team Championship (1 time) – with Gama Singh Jr.
- Black Label Pro
  - BLP Heavyweight Championship (1 time)
- Continental Wrestling Entertainment
  - CWE Heavyweight Championship (1 time)
- Dungeon Wrestling
  - Stu Hart Heritage Championship (1 time)
- Future Pro Wrestling
  - FPW Zero-G Championship (1 time)
- Lucha Libre AAA Worldwide
  - AAA World Tag Team Championship (1 time) – with Satnam Singh
- Prairie Wrestling Alliance
  - PWA Heavyweight Championship (2 times)
  - PWA Canadian Tag Team Championship (1 time) – with Gama Singh Jr.
- Pro Wrestling Illustrated
  - Most Hated Wrestler of the Year (2017)
  - Most Improved Wrestler of the Year (2017)
  - Ranked No. 14 of the top 500 singles wrestlers in the PWI 500 in 2018
- Rolling Stone
  - Comeback of the Year (2017)
- Stampede Wrestling
  - Stampede Wrestling International Tag Team Championship (2 times) – with Gama Singh Jr.
- Wrestling Observer Newsletter
  - Most Overrated (2017)
- WrestleCrap
  - Gooker Award (2017) – Winning the WWE Championship
- WWE
  - WWE Championship (1 time)
  - WWE United States Championship (1 time)
  - WWE 24/7 Championship (2 times)
- Wrestling Xtreme Mania
  - WXM World Heavyweight Championship (1 time, current, inaugural)
