= Champagne Singh =

Canadian professional wrestler

Raj Singh
Personal information
- Born: Munraj Sahota Calgary, Alberta, Canada
- Parent: Gama Singh (father)
- Relative: Jinder Mahal (cousin)

Professional wrestling career
- Ring name(s): Champagne Singh; Campaign Singh; Gama Singh Jr. Raj Singh
- Billed height: 5 ft 11 in (180 cm)
- Billed weight: 213 lb (97 kg)
- Billed from: Punjab, India; Brampton, Ontario, Canada
- Trained by: Bad News Brown; Gama Singh
- Debut: December 27, 2004

Munraj Sahota is a Canadian professional wrestler. best known for his time in Total Nonstop Action Wrestling (TNA), where he performs under the ring name Raj Singh. He previously performed under the ring names Champagne Singh and Campaign Singh.

== Professional wrestling career ==
=== Early career (2004–2018) ===
Sahota received training from his father Gama Singh and debuted as early as 2003. From 2004 to 2016, as Gama Singh Jr., he wrestled solely in the Canadian promotions including Stampede Wrestling, All-Star Wrestling, Prairie Wrestling Alliance, Great North Wrestling and Power Zone Wrestling. During those years, Singh won Tag Team Championships in All-Star Wrestling and Stampede Wrestling, teaming with his cousin Tiger Raj Singh.

=== Impact Wrestling / Total Nonstop Action Wrestling (2018–2025) ===
Sahota debuted in Impact Wrestling on the November 1, 2018 episode of Impact!, under the ring name Raj Singh. He debuted with his tag team partner Rohit Raju under the tag team name Desi Hit Squad. They were introduced by their manager and Singh's father Gama Singh. In their debut match, the Desi Hit Squad defeated the team of The Beach Bums (Freddie IV and TJ Crawford). The Desi Hit Squad finished the year with a match during the December 6, episode of Impact!, defeating the team of Damien Hyde and Manny Lemons.

The Desi Hit Squad returned for the January 3, 2019 episode of Impact! in a tag match against the team of Fallah Bahh and KM, a match which was observed by Scarlett Bordeaux, in hopes of winning her favor. The Desi Hit Squad, however, was unsuccessful in winning the match. During the month of January, Singh wrestled his first singles match, losing to Trey Miguel. He later in the month wrestled and lost his second singles match against Fallah Bahh. During the month of February the Desi Hit Squad wrestled against teams including The Rascalz (Dezmond Xavier and Zachary Wentz) and Eddie Edwards and Eli Drake.

In February 2023, he changed his ring name to "Champagne Singh", adopting more of a playboy character and teaming regularly with Shera. In 2024, he became "Campaign Singh" after aligning himself with Mustafa Ali. At Under Siege 2025, he reverted to his original "Raj Singh" ring name at Under Siege and ended his partnership with Ali, turning face for the first time in his career.

On the October 17 episode of TNA Xplosion, Raj Singh defeated Harlon Abbott in his final match in TNA.

=== Independent circuit (2025–present) ===
After leaving TNA, Singh returned to the Independent circuit competing for promotions like RCW and MLP.

== Personal life ==
Sahota is the son of former professional wrestler Gama Singh. He is also the cousin of wrestler Yuvraj Singh Dhesi, known for his two tenures in the WWE as Jinder Mahal.

He appears in Akash Sherman's documentary film Singhs in the Ring, which premiered at the 2025 Calgary International Film Festival.

== Championships and accomplishments ==
- All-Star Wrestling (Canada)
  - ASW Tag Team Championship (1 time) – with Tiger Raj Singh
- Border City Wrestling
  - BCW Can-Am Tag Team Championship (1 time) – with Rohit Raju
- Prairie Wrestling Alliance
  - PWA Heavyweight Championship (2 times)
  - PWA Mayhem Championship (1 time)
  - PWA Esteemed Championship/PWA Commonwealth Championship (2 times)
  - PWA Canadian Tag Team Championships (1 time) - with Gama Singh Jr.
- Pro Wrestling Illustrated
  - Ranked No. 255 of the top 500 singles wrestlers in the PWI 500 in 2019
- Real Canadian Wrestling
  - RCW Alberta Heritage Championship (2 times)
- Stampede Wrestling
  - Stampede British Commonwealth Mid-Heavyweight Championship (1 time)
  - Stampede Wrestling International Tag Team Championship (2 times) – with Tiger Raj Singh
