= Home Port (disambiguation) =

Home Port may refer to:

- Home port, the port at which a boat or ship is based
- Home Port (1943 film), a/k/a/ Port d'attache, a French comedy-drama film directed by Jean Choux
- Home Port (2016 film), Israeli film directed by Erez Tadmor
- Homeport (2019 film), a/k/a/ Port d'attache, a Canadian documentary film directed by Laurence Lévesque
