= Marie-Pier Grignon =

Canadian film editor

Marie-Pier Grignon is a Canadian film editor. She is most noted for her work as an editor on the 2024 documentary film Okurimono, for which she received a Canadian Screen Award nomination for Best Editing in a Documentary at the 13th Canadian Screen Awards in 2025.

Her other credits have included the films Homeport (Port d'attache) and Death to the Bikini! (À mort le bikini!).
