= Wilhelm Brandl =

Wilhelm Brandl is a Canadian composer and film sound editor from Quebec. He is most noted for his work on the documentary film Okurimono, for which he received a Canadian Screen Award nomination for Best Original Music in a Documentary at the 13th Canadian Screen Awards in 2025.

His other credits have included the short films Yanni, Perséides, Himalia and A Quiet Storm.

His brother, Kristof Brandl, also works in film as a cinematographer.
