= Sébastien Blais =

Canadian cinematographer

Sébastien Blais is a Canadian cinematographer from Quebec. He is most noted for his work on the documentary film Okurimono, for which he received a Canadian Screen Award nomination for Best Cinematography in a Documentary at the 13th Canadian Screen Awards in 2025.

His prior credits include the short documentary film Homeport (Port d'attache), as well as assistant camera credits on the feature films Days of Happiness (Les jours heureux), Hotel Silence (Hôtel Silence) and You Are Not Alone (Vous n'êtes pas seul).
