= Canadian Screen Award for Best Original Music in a Documentary =

Annual Canadian film award

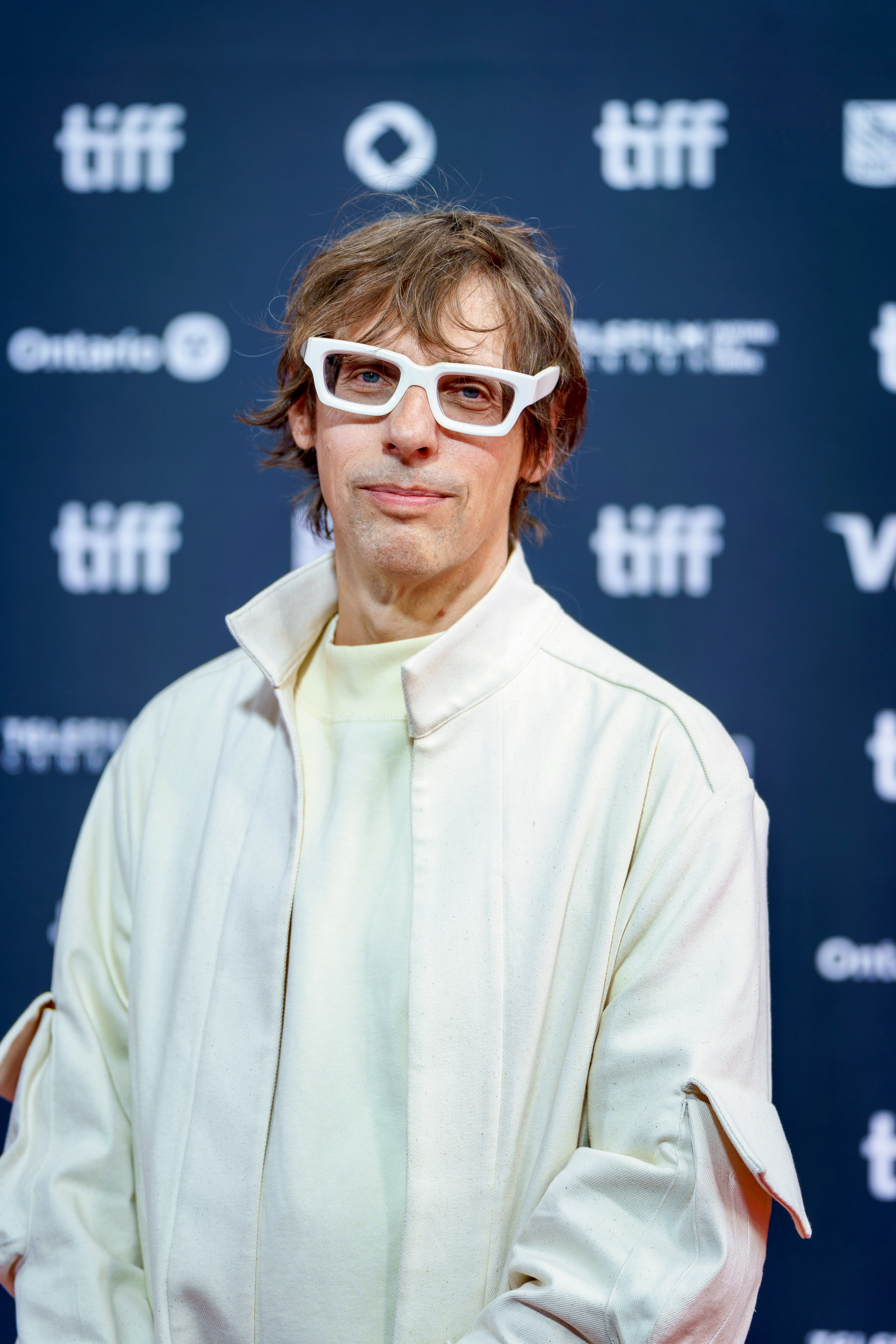
- 2025 winner: Tom Third
- Country: Canada
- Presented by: Academy of Canadian Cinema & Television
- First award: 2022
- Currently held by: Tom Third for Modern Whore (2025)
- Website: academy.ca/awards

The Canadian Screen Award for Best Original Music in a Documentary is an annual award, presented as part of the Canadian Screen Awards program to honour the year's best musical contributions in Canadian theatrical documentary films.

The award was presented for the first time at the 11th Canadian Screen Awards in 2023.

== 2020s ==
Year	Nominees	Film	Ref
2022; 11th Canadian Screen Awards
2022; 11th Canadian Screen Awards	Jonathan Goldsmith	To Kill a Tiger	
2022; 11th Canadian Screen Awards	Ramachandra Borcar	Scrap	
2022; 11th Canadian Screen Awards	Walker Grimshaw	Dear Audrey	
2022; 11th Canadian Screen Awards	Delphine Measroch	Humus	
2022; 11th Canadian Screen Awards	Edo Van Breemen, Johannes Winkler	Handle With Care: The Legend of the Notic Streetball Crew	
2023; 12th Canadian Screen Awards
2023; 12th Canadian Screen Awards	Ramachandra Borcar	The Longest Goodbye	
2023; 12th Canadian Screen Awards	Olivier Alary, Johannes Malfatti	Twice Colonized	
2023; 12th Canadian Screen Awards	Antoine Berthiaume	Greyland	
2023; 12th Canadian Screen Awards	Kat Duma, Verity Susman, Matthew Simms	Tramps!	
2023; 12th Canadian Screen Awards	Stéphanie Hamelin Tomala	I Lost My Mom (J'ai placé ma mère)	
2024; 13th Canadian Screen Awards
2024; 13th Canadian Screen Awards	Murray Lightburn	Any Other Way: The Jackie Shane Story	
2024; 13th Canadian Screen Awards	Olivier Alary, Johannes Malfatti	Yintah	
2024; 13th Canadian Screen Awards	Wilhelm Brandl	Okurimono	
2024; 13th Canadian Screen Awards	Richard Reed Parry	Adrianne and the Castle	
2024; 13th Canadian Screen Awards	Sei Nakauchi Pelletier	Diary of a Father (Journal d'un père)	
2025; 14th Canadian Screen Awards
2025; 14th Canadian Screen Awards	Tom Third	Modern Whore	
2025; 14th Canadian Screen Awards	Marc Bell	Spare My Bones, Coyote! (Mais où va-t-on, coyote?)	
2025; 14th Canadian Screen Awards	Gagan Singh	Singhs in the Ring	
2025; 14th Canadian Screen Awards	Edo Van Breemen	The Track	
2025; 14th Canadian Screen Awards	Genevieve Vincent	The Stand	

== See also ==
- Prix Iris for Best Original Music in a Documentary
