= Singhs in the Ring =

2025 Canadian documentary film

- Directed by: Akash Sherman
- Written by: Akash Sherman
- Produced by: Shane Fennessey; Adam Scorgie; Sunny Sidhu
- Starring: Gama Singh; Champagne Singh
- Cinematography: Chase Gardiner
- Edited by: Pollyanna Hardwicke-Brown; Kevin Morstad; Akash Sherman
- Music by: Gagan Singh
- Production companies: Fennessey Films; FMT Productions; Score G Films
- Distributed by: Crave
- Release date: September 25, 2025 (CIFF)
- Running time: 95 minutes
- Country: Canada
- Language: English

Singhs in the Ring is a Canadian documentary film, directed by Akash Sherman and released in 2025. The film profiles Gama Singh, a pioneering Punjabi Canadian wrestler who was a leading figure in the Stampede Wrestling promotion during his career, as well as his son Raj Singh Sahota, who has carried on the family legacy after his father's retirement.

Other figures appearing in the film include Bret Hart, Chelsea Green, Lance Storm, Singh's nephew Yuvraj Dhesi and sportscaster Harnarayan Singh.

The film premiered at the 2025 Calgary International Film Festival.

== Awards ==
At CIFF, the film won the Audience Award for the Alberta Spotlight program.

Gagan Singh received a Canadian Screen Award nomination for Best Original Music in a Documentary at the 14th Canadian Screen Awards in 2026.
