= Universal Wrestling Federation =

The name Universal Wrestling Federation may refer to:

- Universal Wrestling Federation (Bill Watts), a defunct American professional wrestling promotion that was owned by Bill Watts
- Universal Wrestling Federation (Herb Abrams), a defunct American professional wrestling promotion that was owned by Herb Abrams
- Universal Wrestling Federation (Japan), one of a number of related Japanese professional wrestling promotions
- Universal Wrestling Federation (South Africa), a defunct South African professional wrestling promotion founded by Gama Singh
