= Okurimono =

2024 Canadian documentary film

- Theatrical release poster
- Directed by: Laurence Lévesque
- Written by: Laurence Lévesque
- Produced by: Rosalie Chicoine Perreault; Catherine Boily
- Starring: Noriko Oi
- Cinematography: Sébastien Blais
- Edited by: Marie-Pier Grignon
- Music by: Wilhelm Brandl
- Production company: Metafilms
- Distributed by: Spira
- Release date: April 16, 2024 (Visions du Réel)
- Running time: 96 minutes
- Country: Canada
- Language: Japanese

Okurimono is a 2024 Canadian documentary film directed and written by Laurence Lévesque. The film centres on Noriko, a Japanese Canadian woman returning home to Japan to after her mother's death, where she seeks to find a greater understanding of her mother's experience as a hibakusha, a survivor of the atomic bomb at Nagasaki in 1945.

The film went into production in 2022 under the working title Mama no himitsu.

The film premiered at the 2024 Visions du Réel documentary film festival, and had its Canadian premiere at the 2024 Hot Docs Canadian International Documentary Festival.

== Awards ==
Award	Date of ceremony	Category	Recipient(s)	Result	Ref.
Hot Docs Canadian International Documentary Festival	2024	Earl A. Glick Emerging Canadian Filmmaker Award	Laurence Lévesque	Won	
Canadian Screen Awards	June 1, 2025	Best Feature Length Documentary	Laurence Lévesque, Rosalie Chicoine Perreault, Catherine Boily	Nominated	
Canadian Screen Awards	June 1, 2025	Best Cinematography in a Documentary	Sébastien Blais	Nominated	
Canadian Screen Awards	June 1, 2025	Best Editing in a Documentary	Marie-Pier Grignon	Nominated	
Canadian Screen Awards	June 1, 2025	Best Original Music in a Documentary	Wilhelm Brandl	Nominated	
Canadian Screen Awards	June 1, 2025	Best Sound Design in a Documentary	Marie-Pierre Grenier, Camille Demers-Lambert, Nataq Huault, Olivier Germain, Alexis Farand	Won	
