= Laurence Lévesque =

Canadian film director

Laurence Lévesque is a Canadian film director from Quebec, most noted for her 2024 feature film Okurimono.

She previously directed a number of short films, and was a two-time Prix Iris nominee for Best Short Documentary at the 23rd Quebec Cinema Awards in 2021 for Homeport (Port d'attache) and at the 26th Quebec Cinema Awards in 2024 for Perséides.

Okurimono her first feature documentary, was released in 2024. The film premiered at the 2024 Visions du Réel documentary film festival, and had its Canadian premiere at the 2024 Hot Docs Canadian International Documentary Festival.

At Hot Docs, Lévesque won the Earl A. Glick Emerging Canadian Filmmaker Award. The film later received five Canadian Screen Award nominations at the 13th Canadian Screen Awards in 2025, including Best Feature Length Documentary.

== Filmography ==
- Fitted Sheet (Drap contour) - 2018
- Homeport (Port d'attache) - 2019
- Perséides - 2023
- Okurimono - 2024
