= Perséides (film) =

2023 Canadian documentary film

- Directed by: Laurence Lévesque
- Produced by: Line Sander Egede
- Cinematography: Catherine Lefebvre
- Edited by: Philippe Lefebvre
- Music by: Wilhelm Brandl
- Production company: Art et essai
- Release date: November 23, 2023 (RIDM)
- Running time: 22 minutes
- Country: Canada
- Language: French

Perséides is a Canadian short documentary film, directed by Laurence Lévesque and released in 2023. The film profiles Julie Châtelain, a young woman afflicted with a degenerative eye disease that will eventually leave her blind, as she undergoes medical treatment and learns how to come to terms with and adapt to her changing reality.

The film premiered at the 2023 Montreal International Documentary Festival.

== Awards ==
Award	Date of ceremony	Category	Recipient(s)	Result	Ref.
Prix Iris	December 8, 2024	Best Short Documentary	Laurence Lévesque, Line Sander Egede	Nominated	
