= Money in the Bank ladder match =

Professional wrestling ladder match promoted by WWE

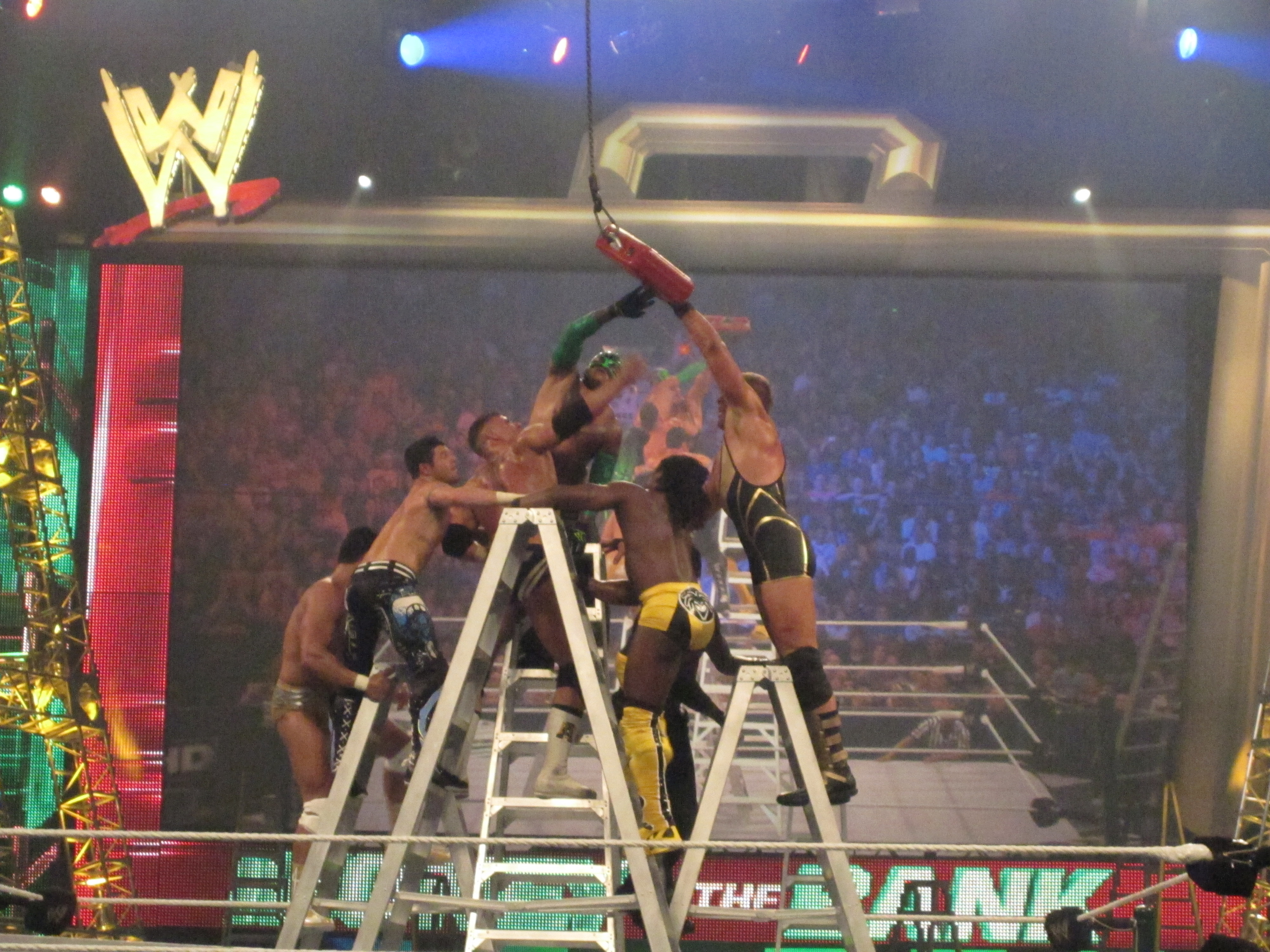
The 2011 Raw Money in the Bank ladder match

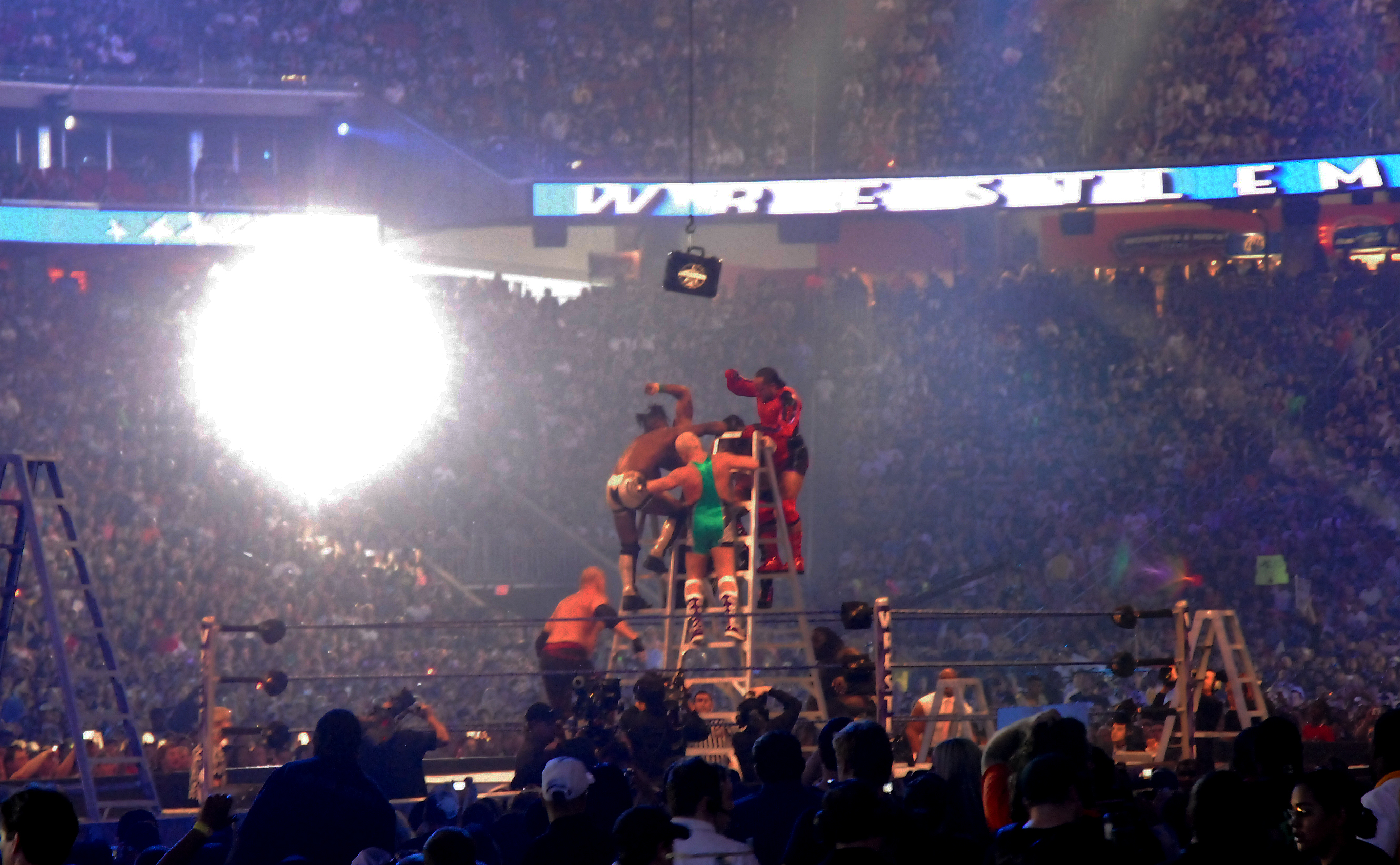
The 2009 Money in the Bank ladder match was performed at WrestleMania 25

The Money in the Bank ladder match is a multi-person ladder match held by the professional wrestling promotion WWE. First performed at WWE's annual WrestleMania event beginning in 2005, a separate Money in the Bank event was established in 2010. The prize of the match is a briefcase containing a contract for a championship match of the winner's choice, which, within WWEs fictional storyline, can be "cashed in" by the holder of the briefcase at any point in the year following their victory. If the contract is not used within a year of winning it, it will be invalid, but this has yet to happen. From its inception until 2017, the match only involved male wrestlers, with the contract being for a world championship match. Beginning with the 2017 Money in the Bank event, women also have the opportunity to compete in such a match, with their prize being a contract for a women's championship match. As of the 2022 event, winners can use the contract on any championship.

The first match was contested in 2005 at WrestleMania 21, after Chris Jericho invented the concept. At the time, it was exclusive to wrestlers of the Raw brand and Edge won the inaugural match. From then until WrestleMania XXVI in March 2010, the Money in the Bank ladder match, now open to all WWE brands, became a WrestleMania mainstay. The 2010 Money in the Bank event saw a second and third Money in the Bank ladder match when the eponymous event debuted that July, with WrestleMania no longer featuring the match. Unlike the matches at WrestleMania, this titular event included two such ladder matches: one each for a contract for a WWE Championship match and a World Heavyweight Championship (2002–2013 version) match, respectively.

Before the establishment of the annual Money in the Bank event, wrestlers were allowed to use the contract to claim a match for any world championship in WWE. After the establishment of the event, the Money in the Bank contracts were specifically aimed at one or the other championship. With the championship unification of the WWE and World Heavyweight titles into the WWE World Heavyweight Championship at the 2013 TLC: Tables, Ladders & Chairs event, there was only a single contract in play. This went into effect beginning with the 2014 Money in the Bank event.

The brand split returned shortly after the 2016 Money in the Bank event along with a new world title. The 2017 event, however, was SmackDown-exclusive and the contract was a match for its world championship, the WWE Championship (formerly WWE World Heavyweight Championship). It also included the first-ever women's Money in the Bank ladder match, with the winner receiving a contract for a SmackDown Women's Championship match. Due to the controversy surrounding the ending of that match, the first non-pay-per-view/livestreaming Money in the Bank ladder match occurred on the June 27 episode of SmackDown. Brand-exclusive pay-per-view and livestreaming events were discontinued the following year, thus the 2018 Money in the Bank event involved both the Raw and SmackDown brands. It had one men's match and one women's match with participants evenly divided between the brands; the respective contracts guaranteed the winner a championship match for the top title of their respective brand, allowing Raw wrestlers (should they win) to cash-in on the Universal Championship or Raw Women's Championship. Beginning with the 2019 Money in the Bank, the respective winners could challenge either brand's champion.

At the 2020 Money in the Bank event, while the rules of the match remained the same, a "Corporate Ladder" gimmick was added on top of the match; both the men's and women's matches, which were held at the same time, took place at WWE's Titan Towers in Stamford, Connecticut, in which the participants began on the ground floor of the building and fought their way to the roof where a ring and ladders were located with the briefcases suspended above the ring; this change was brought about due to the COVID-19 pandemic. The matches returned to their regular format for the 2021 Money in the Bank event. While the contract was originally only for a world championship match, 2022 winner Austin Theory was the first and so far only to cash-in on a non-world championship when he unsuccessfully challenged for the WWE United States Championship.

== Concept ==
The Money in the Bank ladder match can involve anywhere from 5–10 participants, with the objective being to retrieve a briefcase that is suspended 20 feet above the ring. The match was originally only for male wrestlers until 2017, when women began to have their own ladder match. The briefcase originally contained a contract that guaranteed a match for a world championship, and beginning in 2017 also a women's world championship—as of 2022, the contract can be used on any championship. The original match at WrestleMania 21 was exclusive to the Raw brand, with the contract guaranteeing a match for Raw's top title at the time, the World Heavyweight Championship (2002–2013 version). After this, wrestlers had the option between the WWE Championship and the World Heavyweight Championship, regardless of the brand the wrestler belonged to. In 2006, ECW's world title, the ECW Championship, became a third option until 2010, as in February that year, the ECW brand along with the title was deactivated; despite being an option, no contract holder cashed-in on the ECW Championship.

Beginning with the 2010 Money in the Bank event in July, it included two ladder matches, one for the Raw brand and one for SmackDown; Raw's ladder match was for a contract for a match for its top title at the time, the WWE Championship, while SmackDown's contract was for a match for its top title at the time, the World Heavyweight Championship. Although the WWE brand split ended after the 2011 event, a ladder match dedicated to each championship continued through the 2013 event. In December 2013, the titles were unified as the WWE World Heavyweight Championship. The next three years' events included a sole ladder match with a contract guaranteeing a match for the unified title. The brand split returned after the 2016 event. The WWE World Heavyweight Championship was made exclusive to SmackDown and renamed back to WWE Championship, while Raw established the WWE Universal Championship as their top title. Despite this, the 2017 event was SmackDown-exclusive and the contract was for a match for its world title. The 2017 event also saw the first women's Money in the Bank match with its contract for a SmackDown Women's Championship match.

Brand-exclusive PPVs ended following WrestleMania 34 in 2018, with all future events involving both the Raw and SmackDown brands. The Money in the Bank event now features two ladder matches, one for males and one for females, and each has eight participants evenly divided between the brands. The 2018 event was also the first year that the winners could challenge for the Universal Championship and Raw Women's Championship, respectively. For 2018, the winners received a contract for a match for their respective brand's world championship; in 2019, it was changed so that the winners could choose either brand's top championship. The 2020 event saw a variation to the match due to the COVID-19 pandemic: the men's and women's matches, featuring only six competitors each but still evenly divided between the brands, were moved to WWE's headquarters in Stamford, Connecticut, and occurred at the same time, with all competitors beginning on the ground floor and fighting their way to the roof where the briefcases were suspended above a ring. The 2021 event returned to the standard rules, but the 2022 event saw an uneven number of participants in the women's match; there were seven participants with four from Raw and three from SmackDown. The men's match was originally booked with an uneven division but that was rectified just before the match occurred. The 2022 event winner changed the contract, allowing wrestlers the choice of any championship to challenge for; 2022 contract winner Austin Theory unsuccessfully cashed in on the WWE United States Championship. Also in early 2022, the WWE and Universal championships were unified as the Undisputed WWE (Universal) Championship, which became exclusive to SmackDown in 2023, with Raw subsequently introducing a new World Heavyweight Championship, while the Raw and SmackDown women's titles were renamed as the WWE Women's Championship and Women's World Championship, respectively.

The primary gimmick of the Money in the Bank briefcase is that it can be cashed in at the holder's sole discretion, at any time on any WWE programming. This enables the holder to take advantage of a moment's weakness in the champion, even if the champion had just finished a title defense for the night. This strategic use of the briefcase was popularized by Edge, the first Money in the Bank holder, who cashed it in at New Year's Revolution in January 2006, immediately after defending champion John Cena had finished a grueling Elimination Chamber match against five other wrestlers. Because Cena was exhausted and barely able to defend himself, Edge made quick work of the champion, thus setting a powerful precedent for all Money in the Bank holders to come. At WrestleMania 31 in 2015, Seth Rollins set a precedent that a cash-in can even occur while a championship match is in progress; Rollins cashed in during the main event match between Royal Rumble winner Roman Reigns and WWE World Heavyweight Champion Brock Lesnar, converting the match to a triple threat match, and pinned the challenger Reigns to win the title. The Miz attempted to repeat this at the 2020 TLC: Tables, Ladders & Chairs event; however, since his tag team partner John Morrison cashed in the contract on his behalf, it was ruled an invalid cash-in and the contract was returned to The Miz, thus enforcing that only the contract holder can cash in the contract. Drew McIntyre would then cash in during a match between Rollins and reigning World Heavyweight Champion Damian Priest at the 2024 Money in the Bank event, which converted that match into a triple threat, but McIntyre failed his cash in due to an attack from CM Punk, which allowed Priest to retain.

The contract is valid for one year and the briefcase holder—dubbed "Mr./Ms. Money in the Bank"—can cash in the contract at the date, place, and time of their choosing. The briefcase may also be defended in matches, similar to how championships are defended. All of the briefcase holders have successfully defended and cashed in the contract except Mr. Kennedy and Otis, who both won the contract in the ladder match but lost the contract in defending the contract itself in a match.

== History ==
=== 2005 ===
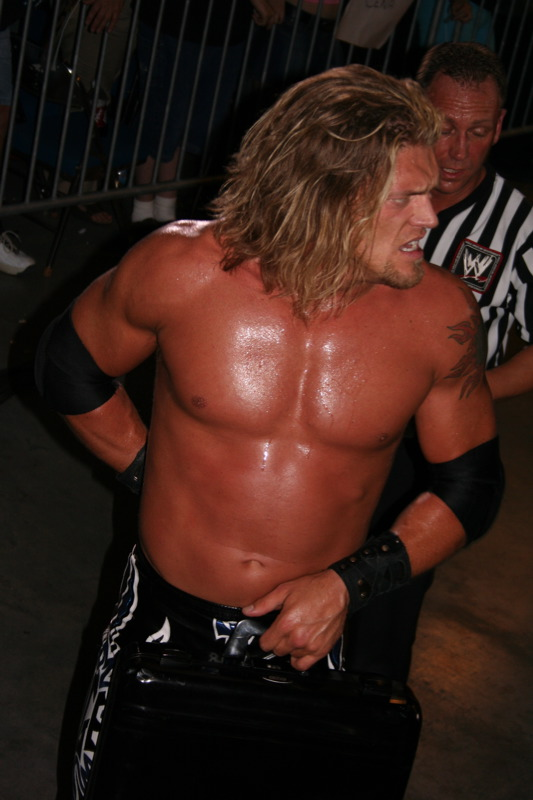
Edge was the first "Mr. Money in the Bank".

In kayfabe, the concept for the Money in the Bank match was introduced in March 2005 by Chris Jericho. Jericho then pitched the idea to Raw general manager Eric Bischoff, who liked it and promptly began to book the match for WrestleMania 21. Edge won the inaugural match and held the contract until New Year's Revolution in January 2006. There, he cashed in his Money in the Bank contract against WWE Champion John Cena, who had just successfully defended the title in an Elimination Chamber match. Edge defeated Cena to become WWE Champion and quickly establishing the precedent of "cashing in" on a vulnerable champion.

=== 2006 ===
The Money in the Bank idea was revived by Carlito on a February 2006 episode of Raw. Mr. McMahon approved the suggestion and set up qualifying matches for the match that would take place at WrestleMania 22. It was later announced that the match was to be interpromotional, and SmackDown! general manager Theodore Long also set up qualifying matches to select three members of his roster to compete. In the Raw brand qualifying matches, Rob Van Dam defeated Trevor Murdoch, Shelton Benjamin defeated Chavo Guerrero, and Ric Flair defeated Carlito. On SmackDown!, Finlay defeated Bobby Lashley, Matt Hardy defeated Road Warrior Animal, and Bobby Lashley won a "last chance battle royal".

Rob Van Dam won the WrestleMania 22 Money in the Bank ladder match after pushing Shelton Benjamin and Matt Hardy off of a ladder, while he was on another ladder, and retrieving the briefcase. That April, he defended the contract and won the WWE Intercontinental Championship in a contract vs. title/winner take all match against Benjamin at Backlash. Van Dam announced in May 2006 that he would cash in his contract at ECW One Night Stand against Cena in an Extreme Rules match. The match ended with Cena losing (with interference from Edge spearing Cena) after Van Dam performed a Five Star Frog Splash. Van Dam is the first person to give prior notice to an opponent before cashing in his contract.

=== 2007 ===
The third Money in the Bank ladder match was held at WrestleMania 23, and was the first to involve eight participants from Raw, SmackDown!, and ECW. Qualifying matches began on the February 19 episode of Raw. On the February 19 episode of Raw, two former Money in the Bank winners (Edge and Rob Van Dam) faced off, with Edge earning a pinfall win to earn the first spot in the match.

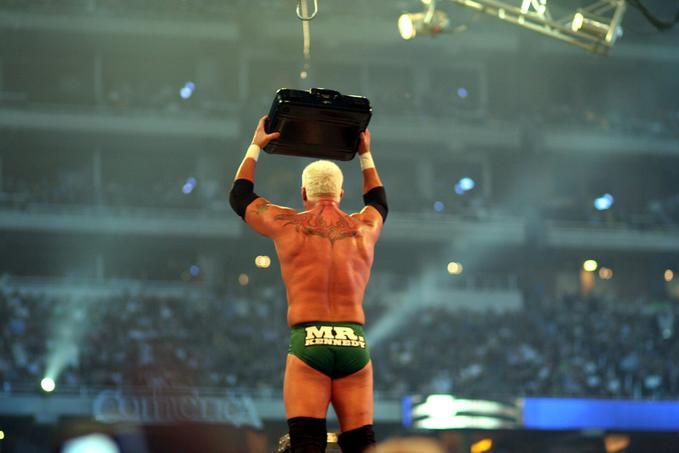
Mr. Kennedy became "Mr. Money in the Bank" at WrestleMania 23 but lost the contract in a match to Edge.

The next night on ECW, another cross-brand match took place, with CM Punk defeating Johnny Nitro to qualify. On that week's SmackDown!, King Booker defeated Kane in a Falls Count Anywhere match following interference from The Great Khali to become the third man to qualify. On the following episode of Raw, Jeff Hardy defeated Shelton Benjamin to become the fourth man to qualify. The next night on ECW, Mr. Kennedy defeated Sabu in an Extreme Rules match to earn the fifth spot. Two qualifying matches took place on the next SmackDown!'s episode, with Matt Hardy defeating Joey Mercury, while Finlay won a triple threat match against Chris Benoit and Montel Vontavious Porter to qualify. What was to be the final qualifying match on Raw between Carlito and Ric Flair, it was deemed to be a no contest when The Great Khali interfered and attacked both men. The match was rescheduled for the next week on Raw, with Randy Orton bribing his way into the match, which was to be a triple threat elimination match that Orton won by pinning both Carlito and Flair after performing an RKO on each of them. Edge and Orton had recently stopped teaming together, and there was a lot of tension between them as they both attempted to get the other taken out of the Money in the Bank ladder match; both failed, as Edge ultimately won a "last chance battle royal" after feigning injury to retain his slot. Orton was forced to fight Bobby Lashley on ECW to retain his spot, which he did.

Kennedy ultimately won at WrestleMania 23, after ramming Punk off the ladder using another ladder (Edge had been taken out earlier by Jeff Hardy). During the next few weeks, Kennedy kept declaring that he would cash in the briefcase at WrestleMania XXIV, however, on the May 7, 2007 episode of Raw, he defended and lost the Money in the Bank briefcase to Edge. Kennedy was the first wrestler in WWE history to lose the briefcase without cashing it in. The following night at the taping for the May 11, 2007 episode of SmackDown!, World Heavyweight Champion The Undertaker and Batista fought to a draw in a steel cage match, after which a returning Mark Henry assaulted The Undertaker and left him injured in the ring. As Henry was leaving, Edge came to the ring with his briefcase, handed it to referee Jim Korderas, and defeated The Undertaker after one spear to win the World Heavyweight Championship for the first time. Edge thus became the first person to gain the Money in the Bank contract twice.

=== 2008 ===
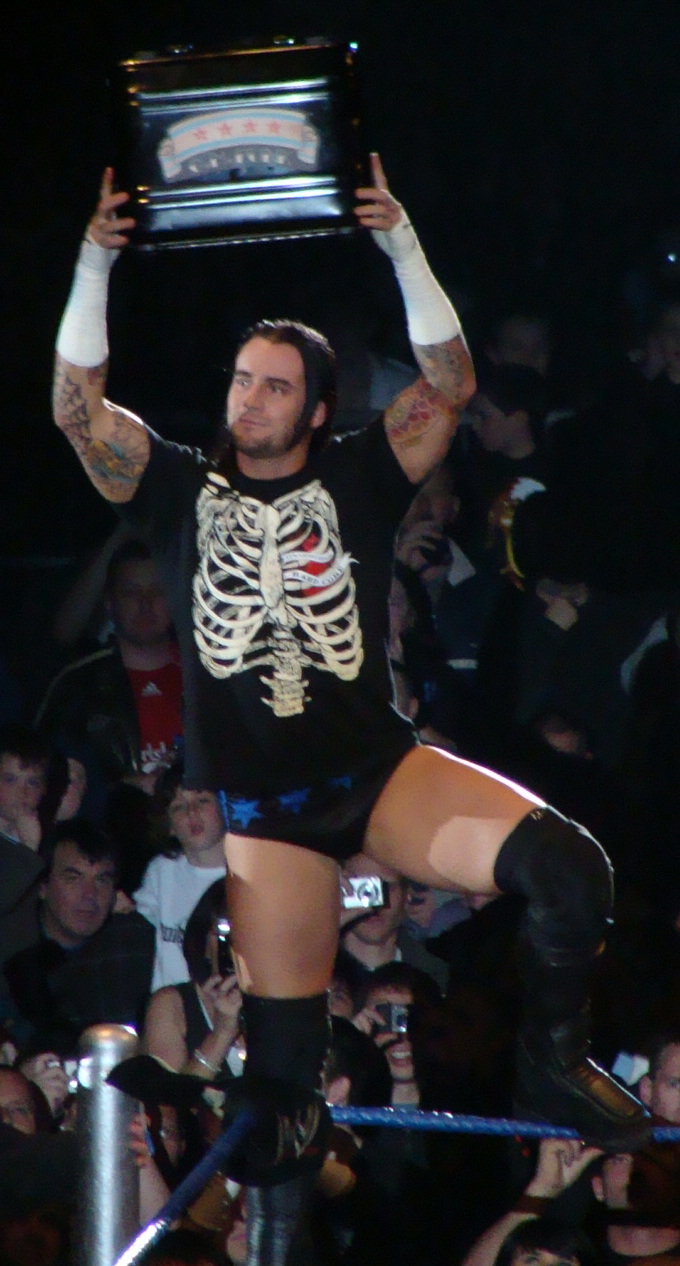
CM Punk is the first two-time Money in the Bank ladder match winner.

The fourth Money in the Bank ladder match took place at WrestleMania XXIV and was intended to be another eight-man match-up, consisting of wrestlers from Raw, SmackDown, and ECW. Qualifying matches began on the February 18 episode of Raw, as both Jeff Hardy and Mr. Kennedy qualified by defeating Snitsky and Val Venis, respectively, in singles matches. On the February 22 episode of SmackDown, Shelton Benjamin qualified by defeating Jimmy Wang Yang in another singles match. Back on Raw, general manager William Regal placed Chris Jericho in a match against Jeff Hardy with the stipulation that if Jericho won, he would be in the ladder match. Jericho defeated Hardy in that match on February 25. The following week on Raw, the two faced off once again, this time for Hardy's WWE Intercontinental Championship. Jericho won the match and title, and it was revealed that Hardy was suspended from WWE for 60 days for violating the wellness policy. Hardy was subsequently removed from the Money in the Bank ladder match and WrestleMania altogether, making this ladder match a seven-man contest. Also on this episode of Raw, Carlito defeated Cody Rhodes to qualify. On a SmackDown/ECW live event on March 9, United States Champion Montel Vontavious Porter defeated Jamie Noble to qualify. On the March 11 episode of ECW, CM Punk defeated Big Daddy V to qualify. On the March 14 episode of SmackDown, John Morrison defeated his tag team partner The Miz to be the last man to qualify.

Punk won the WrestleMania XXIV match after trapping Jericho's leg in a ladder and then climbing the ladder. Punk cashed in his title shot on the June 30 episode of Raw. A farewell speech by Jim Ross was interrupted by then-World Heavyweight Champion Edge who had him removed from the ring and then began to insult the crowd, saying that they would never get to see a world championship being defended on Raw (as at the time both Edge and WWE Champion Triple H were members of the SmackDown brand and the ECW Championship was on the ECW brand after Mark Henry defeated then champion Kane of the Raw brand and Big Show of the SmackDown brand at Night of Champions in a triple threat match to win the title). When he was about to leave the arena, Batista came out and assaulted Edge in retaliation for Edge cheating to win their title match the previous night at Night of Champions. Punk ran to the ring with a referee to cash in his contract, then performed a Go to Sleep on Edge to win the World Heavyweight Championship, making it Raw-exclusive in the process.

=== 2009 ===
The fifth annual Money in the Bank ladder match was announced for WrestleMania 25. Qualifying matches began on the February 23 episode of Raw, in which CM Punk qualified by defeating John Morrison and The Miz in a triple threat match. On the March 2 episode of Raw, Kane defeated Mike Knox and Rey Mysterio in another triple threat match. On the March 3 episode of ECW, Mark Henry qualified for the match by defeating Santino Marella. Both Montel Vontavious Porter and Shelton Benjamin qualified for the match on the March 6 episode of SmackDown, defeating Matt and Jeff Hardy in respective single matches. On the March 9 episode of Raw, Kofi Kingston qualified by defeating Chris Jericho, after Jericho was distracted by Ric Flair. Christian qualified the following night on ECW by winning a tri-brand battle royal. Finlay was the final person to qualify for the match when he defeated The Brian Kendrick on the March 13 episode of SmackDown.

At WrestleMania 25, Punk won the match and became the first wrestler to win two Money in the Bank ladder matches, and the only one to win the match for two consecutive years. On the May 1 episode of SmackDown, Punk challenged the World Heavyweight Champion Edge for a non-title match with the intent that if he defeated Edge, he would cash in his title shot right after the match. Later that night, Punk defeated Edge and attempted to cash in. However, before the ringside bell could ring to start the title match, Punk and Edge were both attacked by Umaga and Jeff Hardy respectively. As a consequence, the match never started and Punk retained his contract. Punk again tried to cash in for a World Heavyweight Championship match against Edge on the May 15 episode of SmackDown, but was again stopped by Umaga. After Jeff Hardy defeated Edge in a ladder match to win the World Heavyweight Championship at Extreme Rules, Punk cashed in to win the World Heavyweight Championship for the second time. As a result of the fans booing him for cashing on Hardy, who was very popular with the fans, Punk began a gradual change of character into a villain.

=== 2010 ===
==== February–April ====
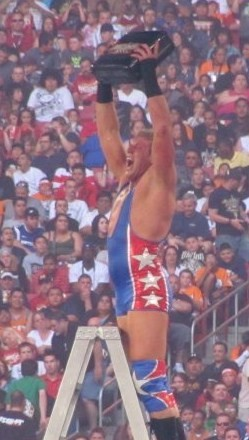
Jack Swagger won the sixth and final Money in the Bank ladder match to be held at WrestleMania.

On the February 22 episode of Raw, it was announced that the sixth annual Money in the Bank ladder match would take place at WrestleMania XXVI. The first qualifying match was held later that night, where Christian defeated Carlito to qualify. Three more qualifying matches were held on the February 26 episode of SmackDown, with Dolph Ziggler defeating John Morrison and R-Truth in a Triple Threat match, Kane defeating Drew McIntyre, and Shelton Benjamin defeating CM Punk to qualify. The March 1 episode of Raw saw both Jack Swagger and Montel Vontavious Porter qualify by defeating Santino Marella and Zack Ryder respectively. Matt Hardy was the next to qualify for the match when he defeated Drew McIntyre on the March 5 episode of SmackDown. In what was initially declared as the final qualifying match, Evan Bourne defeated William Regal on the March 8 episode of Raw to become the eighth competitor. Due to his favorable association with WWE Chairman Mr. McMahon, McIntyre was given a third chance on the March 12 episode of SmackDown to qualify for the match. In what would also be made a WWE Intercontinental Championship defense by SmackDown general manager Theodore Long, McIntyre defeated local competitor Aaron Bolo to qualify. On the March 22 episode of Raw, the number of participants was once again increased to a record ten, when Kofi Kingston defeated Vladimir Kozlov to qualify.

At WrestleMania XXVI, Jack Swagger won the match after knocking Christian off a ladder with the briefcase itself. The following night on Raw, Swagger attempted to cash in his shot against the WWE Champion John Cena after ambushing Cena. However, as Cena recovered too quickly from the ambush, Swagger cancelled his match and retained his contract. The next night, at the taping for the April 2, 2010 episode of SmackDown, after Edge attacked then World Heavyweight Champion Chris Jericho, Swagger cashed in his contract and successfully claimed the World Heavyweight Championship.

==== June–November ====
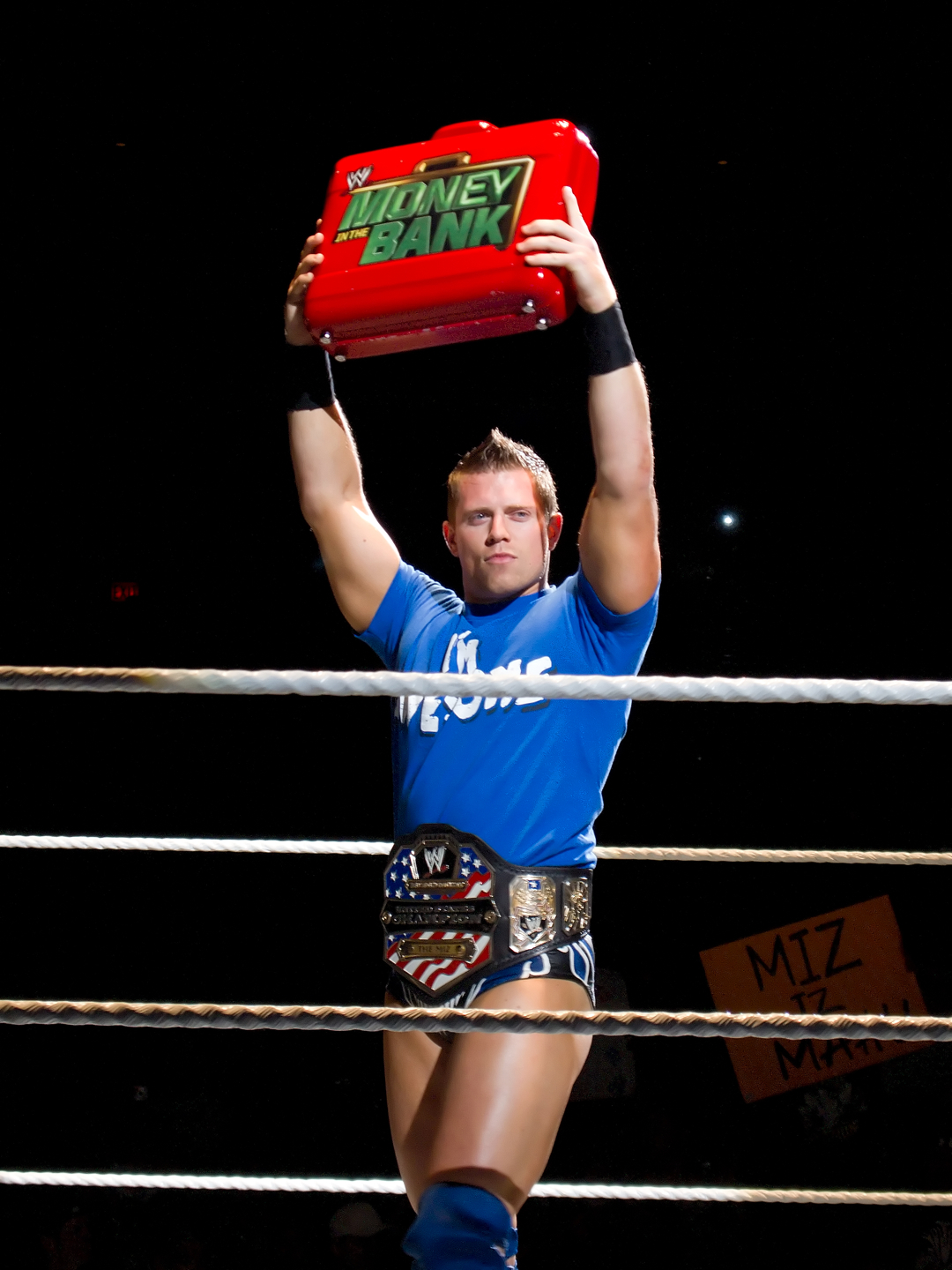
The Miz won Raw's Money in the Bank ladder match in July 2010.

In February 2010, WWE announced that "Money in the Bank" would be the title to their July 19 pay-per-view event at the Sprint Center in Kansas City, Missouri. The event included two Money in the Bank ladder matches, one for each brand. Unlike previous iterations of the match, the winners could only challenge for their own brand's World Championship. All eight competitors for the Raw brand's match were announced on the June 28 episode of Raw by guest host Rob Zombie. The eight competitors were Randy Orton, The Miz, R-Truth, Chris Jericho, Evan Bourne, Ted DiBiase, John Morrison and Edge. On the July 5th episode of Raw, R-Truth was involved in an injury storyline with The Miz and was subsequently removed from the match and replaced by Mark Henry. Two days later, WWE announced six of the competitors for the SmackDown brand's match through its official website: Matt Hardy, Kane, Cody Rhodes, Christian, Kofi Kingston and Big Show. On the July 9 episode of SmackDown, Drew McIntyre and Dolph Ziggler both competed in qualifying matches and were added to the match.

At Money in the Bank, Kane won the SmackDown Money in the Bank ladder match. Kane later cashed it in the same night by defeating Rey Mysterio to win the World Heavyweight Championship. He also became the quickest man to cash in the briefcase. For Raw, The Miz won that brand's Money in the Bank contract. After a couple of aborted attempts (which due to the bell not sounding to start the matches, allowed The Miz to keep the briefcase on each occasion), The Miz finally cashed in his title opportunity on the November 22, 2010 episode of Raw, immediately after Randy Orton successfully retained the WWE Championship against Wade Barrett in which The Nexus attacked Orton before the match and injured his right leg. The Miz defeated Orton to win his first WWE Championship.

=== 2011 ===
The 2011 Money in the Bank pay-per-view took place on July 17 at the Allstate Arena in Rosemont, Illinois. Raw's Alberto Del Rio and SmackDown's Daniel Bryan won their respective brands' Money in the Bank ladder matches. At the end of the night, after CM Punk won the WWE Championship from John Cena, Mr. McMahon ordered Del Rio to come in and attempt to cash in his briefcase against Punk, who had threatened to leave the company after the pay-per-view, as his contract was expiring. Del Rio came out to do so, but Punk attacked him and fled through the crowd. A similar cash-in attempt was performed on then-champion Rey Mysterio on the July 25, 2011, episode of Raw, but Del Rio was again unable to cash in the briefcase. Del Rio was able to cash in his briefcase and defeated CM Punk for the WWE Championship at the 2011 SummerSlam event on August 14.

On the July 22, 2011, episode of SmackDown, Bryan announced that he was going to cash his contract in at WrestleMania XXVIII in April 2012. On the November 25, 2011, episode of SmackDown, Bryan cashed in on World Heavyweight Champion Mark Henry, who had been knocked out by Big Show. Bryan got the pinfall victory and was awarded the championship, however SmackDown General Manager Theodore Long overruled the match due to Henry not being medically cleared to compete, the first time a Money in the Bank cash-in match was reversed. Since the match never officially took place, Bryan was given the briefcase back and again reiterated that he planned on cashing in at WrestleMania XXVIII, although he was given a shot at the World Heavyweight Championship against Henry in a steel cage match on a live holiday-themed episode of SmackDown the following Tuesday, which Bryan lost. On December 18, at the 2011 TLC: Tables, Ladders & Chairs event, after Big Show defeated Henry to win the World Heavyweight Championship, Henry attacked Big Show with a steel chair, allowing Bryan to cash in his briefcase on Big Show to win his first World Heavyweight Championship.

=== 2012 ===
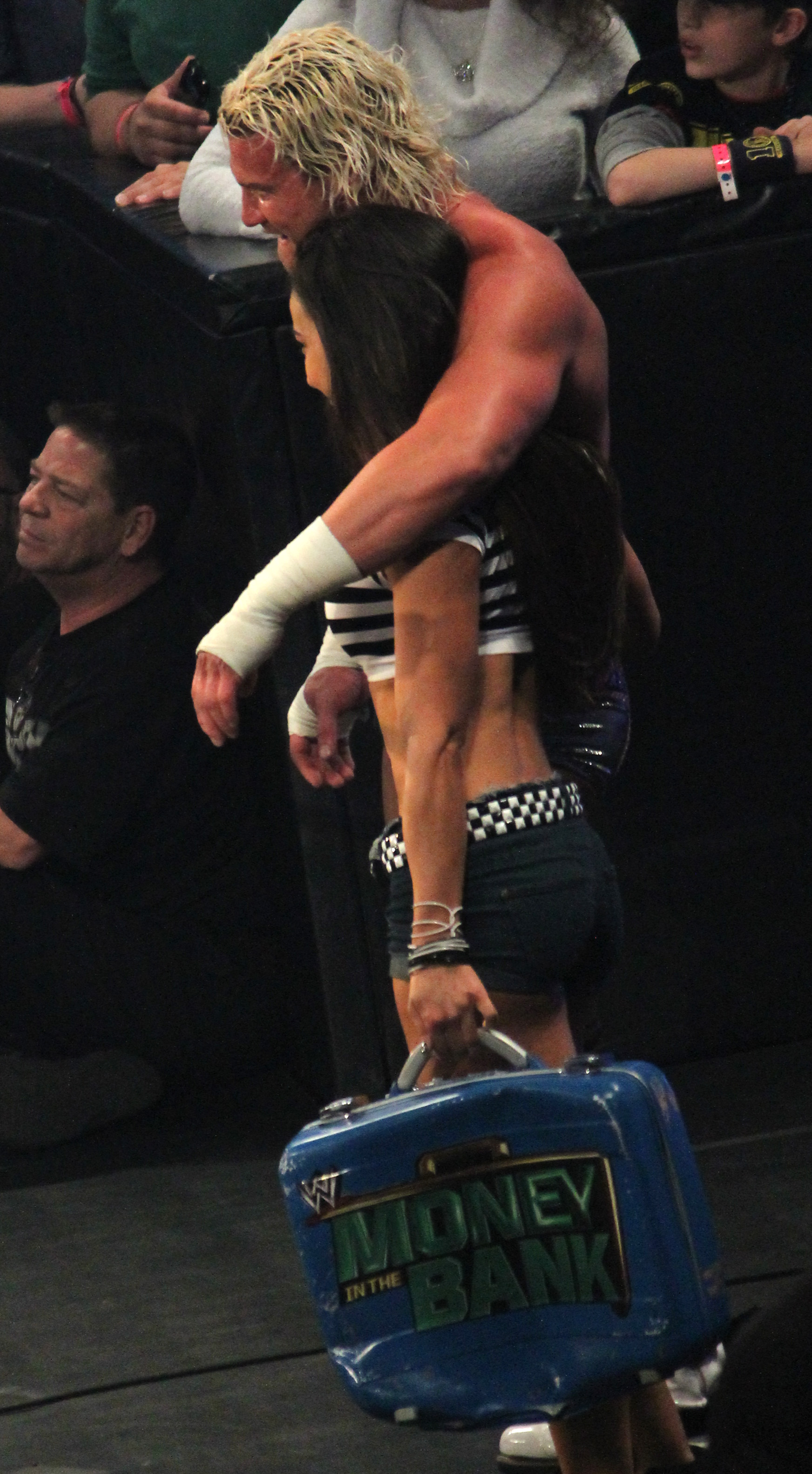
Dolph Ziggler with AJ Lee, who is holding his Money in the Bank briefcase for a World Heavyweight Championship match

The 2012 Money in the Bank pay-per-view took place on July 15 at the US Airways Center in Phoenix, Arizona. There were the usual two Money in the Bank ladder matches; however, the matches were no longer separated by brands, as both Raw and SmackDown by this time had become full roster "Supershows". Instead, they were separated by championships (WWE and World Heavyweight).

In the first match of the night, Dolph Ziggler defeated seven other competitors to win the World Heavyweight Championship match contract. All of the world title Money in the Bank competitors in world title ladder match also won qualifying matches. He attempted to cash it in that same night against Sheamus but was attacked before the referee could call for the bell so he retained his contract. On the August 20 episode of Raw, Ziggler successfully defended his briefcase against Chris Jericho in career vs. contract match. As a result, Jericho was forced to leave WWE. On the December 3 episode of Raw, managing supervisor Vickie Guerrero was forced by Mr. McMahon to make Cena and Ziggler's match at the 2012 TLC: Tables, Ladders and Chairs event a ladder match for Ziggler's Money in the Bank contract. On December 16, at the event, he successfully defended the briefcase with help from AJ Lee. On April 8, 2013, an episode of Raw, Ziggler cashed in his contract on World Heavyweight Champion Alberto Del Rio, following Del Rio's handicap match win over Jack Swagger and Zeb Colter. Ziggler defeated Del Rio to win his second World Heavyweight Championship following nearly nine months of holding the briefcase.

In the last match of 2012 event, John Cena defeated Kane, Big Show, The Miz, and Chris Jericho to win the WWE Championship Money in the Bank briefcase in his first Money in the Bank ladder match. A special stipulation had been added beforehand that only former WWE Champions could participate in the WWE Championship Money in the Bank ladder match for 2012. Cena won when the briefcase's handle snapped off while using it against Big Show, having previously blocked Show's KO Punch with it. On the July 16, 2012, episode of Raw, Cena announced that he would cash his contract in the following week at Raw 1000. He became only the second wrestler after Rob Van Dam to give prior notice to the opponent. At Raw 1000, Cena failed to win the WWE title when Big Show interfered in the match, causing champion CM Punk to be disqualified and retain the title, as championships cannot change hands via disqualification unless otherwise stipulated. This made Cena the first Money in the Bank winner to fail to win a title.

=== 2013 ===
The 2013 Money in the Bank pay-per-view took place on July 14 at the Wells Fargo Center in Philadelphia. There was the traditional two Money in the Bank ladder matches: one for a WWE Championship match contract and the other for a World Heavyweight Championship match contract. On the June 24, 2013, episode of Raw, CM Punk, Daniel Bryan, Randy Orton, Sheamus, Christian, Kane, and Rob Van Dam were announced by WWE Chief Brand Officer Stephanie McMahon as the participants in the WWE Championship contract match. Kane was later removed after being injured due to an attack by The Wyatt Family on the July 8 episode of Raw. Orton went on to win the contract at the event. At the 2013 SummerSlam event on August 18, Orton cashed in his contract on WWE Champion Daniel Bryan, who had defeated John Cena to win the championship. Orton defeated Bryan to win his seventh WWE Championship, after WWE COO Triple H, who was the special guest referee between Bryan and Cena, attacked Bryan with a Pedigree, following five weeks of holding the briefcase.

At the tapings for SmackDown on June 25 (aired June 28), SmackDown Senior Advisor Theodore Long announced that the participants in the World Heavyweight Championship contract match would be WWE United States Champion Dean Ambrose, Fandango, Antonio Cesaro, Jack Swagger, Wade Barrett, Cody Rhodes and Damien Sandow. Sandow won the contract at the event. On the October 28, 2013, episode of Raw, Sandow cashed in his contract on World Heavyweight Champion John Cena. Cena defeated Sandow, making Sandow the second wrestler to unsuccessfully cash in the contract and the first to lose a cash-in match via pinfall. At the 2013 TLC: Tables, Ladders & Chairs event on December 15, the WWE and World Heavyweight championships were unified into the WWE World Heavyweight Championship.

=== 2014 ===
The 2014 Money in the Bank pay-per-view took place on June 29 at the TD Garden in Boston, Massachusetts. The original plan for the event was that the winner of the ladder match would receive a contract for a match for the now unified title as normal. On June 9, defending WWE World Heavyweight Champion Daniel Bryan was forced to vacate the title due to a neck injury, and the already announced ladder match consisting of John Cena, Randy Orton, Alberto Del Rio, Bray Wyatt, Cesaro, Sheamus, Kane, and Roman Reigns became for the vacant championship instead.

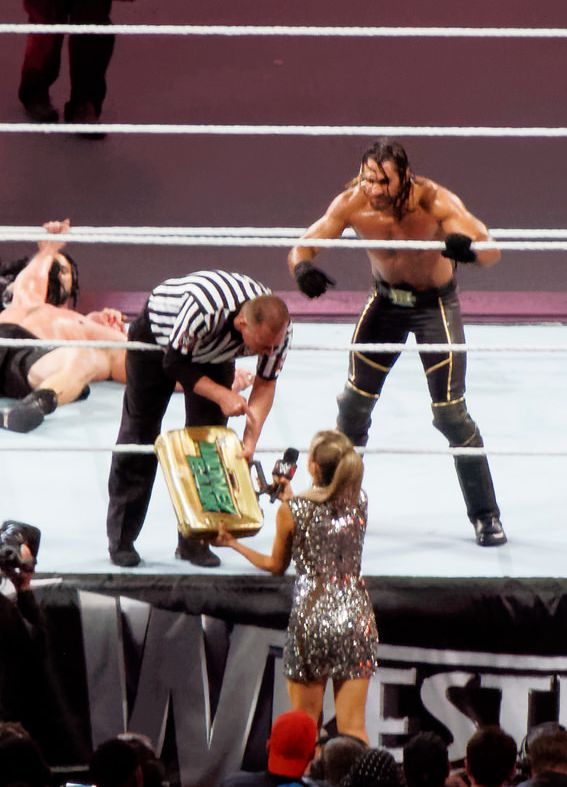
Seth Rollins cashing in his Money in the Bank contract at WrestleMania 31

On the June 17 episode of Main Event, Seth Rollins announced that in addition to the ladder match for the title, there would be a traditional Money in the Bank ladder match for a WWE World Heavyweight Championship match contract at the event, and that Rollins would be the first entrant. Further entrants were Bad News Barrett, Dolph Ziggler, Rob Van Dam, Jack Swagger, Kofi Kingston, and Dean Ambrose. The latter, who had threatened to disrupt the match, was added to the match on Rollins' request. Bad News Barrett was later removed from the match due to an injury.

Rollins won the match and the contract after Kane interfered on behalf of The Authority and knocked Dean Ambrose off the ladder. He attempted to cash in the following night on new champion John Cena but was stopped from doing so by Ambrose. Rollins once again failed to cash in his Money in the Bank briefcase, this time against WWE World Heavyweight Champion Brock Lesnar at the 2014 Night of Champions event in September, after attacking him with a Curb Stomp. This failed attempt to cash in came after Cena attacked Rollins, before the bell could be rung, due to Rollins costing him the championship minutes earlier.

At WrestleMania 31 in March 2015, Rollins cashed in his briefcase during the main event championship match between defending champion Brock Lesnar and challenger Roman Reigns. By doing so, he turned the singles match between Lesnar and Reigns into a triple threat match. Rollins then proceeded to pin Reigns following a Curb Stomp and successfully captured the WWE World Heavyweight Championship. As a result, Rollins set various records: he became the first person to cash in a contract while a championship match was in progress, he became the first person to cash in his briefcase at WrestleMania, and he became the first to win the championship without pinning the champion during the cash-in match.

=== 2015 ===
The 2015 Money in the Bank pay-per-view took place on June 14 in Columbus, Ohio. Dolph Ziggler, Sheamus, Kofi Kingston, Neville, Roman Reigns, Randy Orton, and Kane participated in the traditional Money in the Bank ladder match. Sheamus won the match and received a WWE World Heavyweight Championship match contract.

At the 2015 Survivor Series event on November 22, Sheamus cashed in his contract by defeating Reigns, who had just won the vacant championship after defeating Dean Ambrose in the tournament finals.

=== 2016 ===
On June 19, the seventh annual Money in the Bank pay-per-view took place in Las Vegas. For the traditional Money in the Bank ladder match, Sami Zayn, Kevin Owens, Cesaro, Chris Jericho, Alberto Del Rio, and Dean Ambrose all won their qualifying matches on the May 23 episode of Raw to become entrants into the match. Originally slated to be a 7-man ladder match, the seventh slot was later removed. Ambrose won the match and received a WWE World Heavyweight Championship match contract. After the conclusion of the main event, he successfully cashed in the contract on Seth Rollins, who had just won the title from Roman Reigns. Ambrose was the second wrestler to cash in the contract on the same night as winning it. The night was also notable due to it making the stable The Shield the first group in WWE history to be world champions on the same night.

The brand split was reinstated the following month.

=== 2017 ===
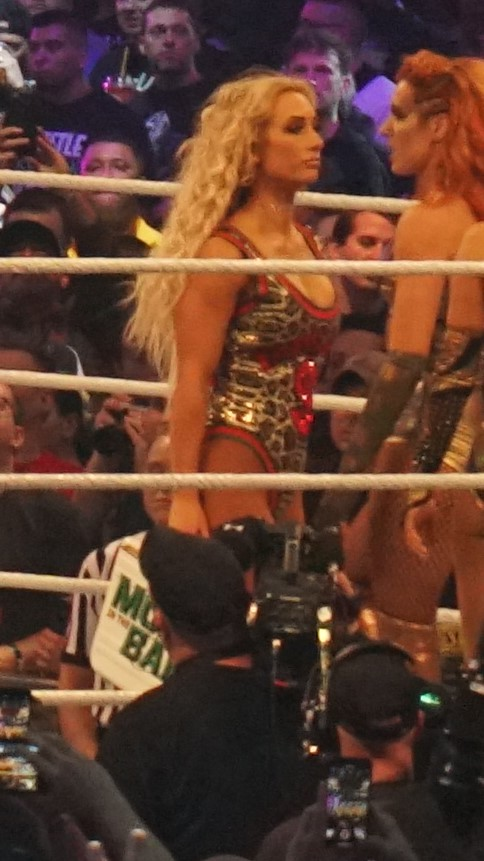
Carmella was the winner of the first women's Money in the Bank ladder match.

The 2017 Money in the Bank pay-per-view took place on June 18 at the Scottrade Center in St. Louis, Missouri as an exclusive event for the SmackDown brand. For the traditional ladder match, which had a contract for a match for SmackDown's WWE Championship (formerly WWE World Heavyweight Championship), SmackDown Commissioner Shane McMahon announced AJ Styles, Shinsuke Nakamura, Dolph Ziggler, Sami Zayn, and Baron Corbin as the original five participants. United States Champion Kevin Owens was added after he convinced Shane to make him the sixth participant. Mojo Rawley had the opportunity to make it a seven-man match if he could defeat WWE Champion Jinder Mahal, but failed to do so. At the event, Baron Corbin won the match and received a WWE Championship match contract. On the August 15, 2017 episode of SmackDown Live, John Cena had a non-title match against WWE Champion Jinder Mahal. As Cena was pinning Mahal, Corbin attacked him, causing a disqualification. Corbin then cashed in his Money in the Bank contract on Mahal, but as soon as the bell rung, he attacked Cena, who was on the apron, allowing Mahal to quickly roll-up Corbin for the win. This made Corbin the third wrestler to unsuccessfully cash in the contract and the second to lose a cash-in match.

On the May 30 episode of SmackDown Live, another Money in the Bank ladder match was added to the event, and for the first time, involving women. Charlotte Flair, Becky Lynch, Natalya, Carmella, and Tamina were originally scheduled to compete in a fatal five-way elimination match on that night to determine the number one contender for the SmackDown Women's Championship against Naomi at Money in the Bank. Before their match could begin, a brawl broke out between the five and the match never occurred. SmackDown Commissioner Shane McMahon then scheduled the five to compete in the first-ever women's Money in the Bank ladder match at the event where the winner would receive a contract for a SmackDown Women's Championship match. Carmella won the match after James Ellsworth retrieved the briefcase, and threw it to her. On the following episode of SmackDown Live, however, SmackDown General Manager Daniel Bryan forced Carmella to relinquish the briefcase since Ellsworth retrieved it for her. On that same episode, Bryan also scheduled a Money in the Bank ladder match rematch for the June 27 episode with Ellsworth banned from ringside (later from the arena). That episode, Carmella, with some aid from the banned Ellsworth, retrieved the briefcase herself and reclaimed the SmackDown Women's Championship match contract. On the April 10, 2018 episode of SmackDown Live, after holding the contract for 287 days (the longest time any wrestler has held on to a Money in the Bank briefcase), Carmella cashed in and defeated Charlotte Flair—who had just suffered an attack from the debuting The IIconics (Peyton Royce and Billie Kay)—for the SmackDown Women's Championship.

=== 2018 ===
The 2018 Money in the Bank pay-per-view took place on June 17 at the Allstate Arena in the Chicago suburb of Rosemont, Illinois. For the first time since 2011 with a brand split in effect, the event became dual-branded, involving both the Raw and SmackDown brands. The event included one male match and one female match with eight participants each, evenly divided between the brands. The contracts granted the winners a match for the world championship of their respective brand. The men's contract granted the winner a match for either Raw's Universal Championship or SmackDown's WWE Championship, while the women's contract granted the winner a Raw Women's Championship or SmackDown Women's Championship match.

Qualification matches for both ladder matches began on the May 7 episode of Raw. For the men's match, Braun Strowman, Finn Bálor, Bobby Roode, and Kevin Owens qualified from Raw, while The Miz, Rusev, a member of The New Day (revealed to be Kofi Kingston at the event), and Samoa Joe qualified from SmackDown. Strowman would go on to win the ladder match and contract. During the ladder match, Strowman threw Owens off the top of a ladder and Owens crashed through a table. The two would then feud, leading to a match at SummerSlam where Strowman defended his contract against Owens with the stipulation being that if Strowman lost by any means, he would lose the contract. Strowman, however, retained the contract. He would then become the third person to announce their cash-in match ahead of time. He first announced that he would cash-in on the winner of the SummerSlam main event match between defending Universal Champion Brock Lesnar and Roman Reigns, but during that match, he was incapacitated by Lesnar, and thus did not cash-in (this distraction would allow Reigns to defeat Lesnar for the title). He then announced that he would cash-in on new champion Roman Reigns at Hell in a Cell in a Hell in a Cell match (Mick Foley was later added as the special guest referee). The match, however, ended in a no-contest after Lesnar appeared and laid out both men, rendering them unable to continue. Strowman became the fourth person to fail in gaining a championship in their cash-in match, and the first to fail by a no-contest ruling.

For the women's match, Ember Moon, Alexa Bliss, Natalya, and Sasha Banks qualified from Raw, while Charlotte Flair, Becky Lynch, Lana, and Naomi qualified from SmackDown. Bliss would win the ladder match and later that night, she would cause a disqualification in the Raw Women's Championship match between defending champion Nia Jax and Ronda Rousey, and then cashed in the contract and defeated Jax to win the title, thus becoming the third wrestler (and first woman) to cash in her contract on the same night as winning it.

=== 2019 ===
The 2019 Money in the Bank pay-per-view took place on May 19 at the XL Center in Hartford, Connecticut. Like the 2018 event, there was one male ladder match and one female ladder match with eight participants each, evenly divided between the Raw and SmackDown brands. Unlike 2018, however, the contracts granted the winners a match for the world championship of their choice. The men's contract granted the winner a match for either Raw's Universal Championship or SmackDown's WWE Championship, while the women's contract granted the winner a Raw Women's Championship or SmackDown Women's Championship match.

Raw's four participants for the men's match were announced by Alexa Bliss during her "A Moment of Bliss" segment on the April 29 episode of Raw: Braun Strowman, Ricochet, Drew McIntyre, and Baron Corbin. SmackDown's four participants were announced the following night on SmackDown: Ali, Finn Bálor, Andrade, and Randy Orton. Robert Roode (formerly Bobby Roode) had the chance to replace Ricochet in the ladder match if he could defeat Ricochet, but was unsuccessful, while Sami Zayn, who was assisted by Corbin and McIntyre, defeated Strowman in a falls count anywhere match to take Strowman's spot. During the event prior to the match, Zayn was attacked backstage and taken to a medical facility. Strowman was alleged as the attacker and was asked to leave the arena, despite denying the claim. The match pursued without an announced replacement for Zayn, however, at the climax of the match, Brock Lesnar made a surprise return as Zayn's unannounced replacement and won the contract. After teasing cashing in on Universal Champion Seth Rollins and WWE Champion Kofi Kingston and failing an attempt to cash-in on Rollins at Super ShowDown, Lesnar successfully cashed in his contract to win the Universal Championship from Rollins at Extreme Rules on July 14, right after Rollins and Raw Women's Champion Becky Lynch had retained their respective titles against Baron Corbin and Lacey Evans in a Last Chance Winners Take All Extreme Rules mixed tag team match. This made Lesnar the first wrestler to successfully cash in on the Universal Championship.

The four participants from Raw in the women's match were also announced by Alexa Bliss during another "A Moment of Bliss" segment on the April 29 episode of Raw: Natalya, Dana Brooke, Naomi, and Bliss herself. On the following night's episode of SmackDown, Bayley, Mandy Rose, Ember Moon, and Carmella were revealed as SmackDown's four participants. On May 16, it was revealed that Bliss was not medically cleared to compete and was replaced by Nikki Cross. Bayley would go on and win the match and later that night, she cashed in her contract on Charlotte Flair, who had just defeated Becky Lynch for the SmackDown Women's Championship, and defeated Flair to win the title. This made her the fourth wrestler (and second woman) to cash in her contract on the same night as winning it.

=== 2020 ===
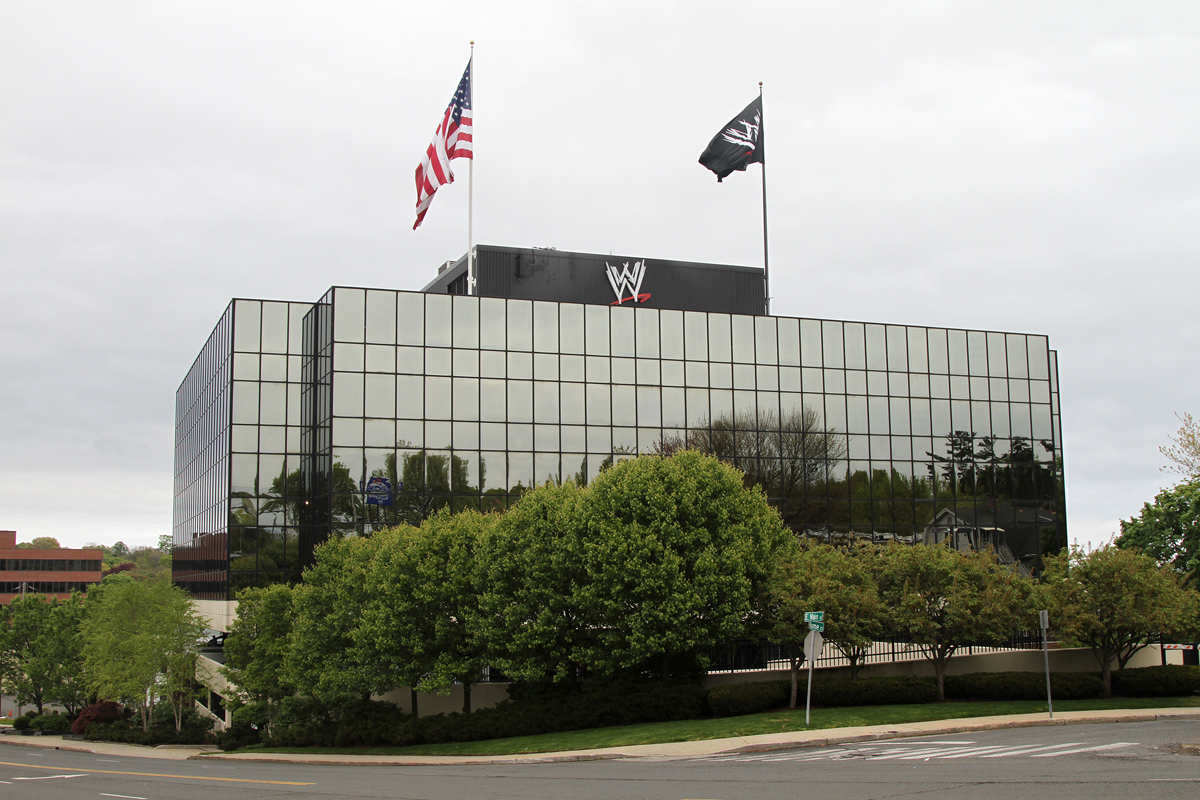
WWE Global Headquarters (from 2012) was the site of the 2020 men's and women's Money in the Bank ladder matches.

The 2020 Money in the Bank pay-per-view aired on May 10. Due to the COVID-19 pandemic, it was not held at its originally announced venue of Royal Farms Arena in Baltimore, and the majority of its matches were presented live from the WWE Performance Center in Orlando.

The eponymous ladder matches were retooled to use a pre-recorded format with cinematic elements, and were filmed within WWE's global headquarters in Stamford, Connecticut. The participants in each match began on the ground floor and fought their way to a ring on the roof, which the briefcases were suspended above. Both the men's and women's Money in the Bank matches occurred at the same time.

With the changes in format, the participants in each match were reduced from eight to six, but still evenly divided between the Raw and SmackDown brands. For the women's match, Asuka, Shayna Baszler, and the returning Nia Jax qualified from Raw by defeating Ruby Riott, Sarah Logan, and Kairi Sane, respectively, while Dana Brooke, Lacey Evans, and Carmella filled out the SmackDown spots by defeating Naomi, Sasha Banks, and Mandy Rose, respectively. For the men's match, Aleister Black, Apollo Crews, and Rey Mysterio qualified from Raw by defeating Austin Theory, Montel Vontavious Porter, and Murphy, respectively, while Daniel Bryan, King Corbin, and Otis qualified from SmackDown by defeating Cesaro, Drew Gulak, and Dolph Ziggler, respectively. Crews, however, was injured by Andrade and was pulled from the match. A returning AJ Styles won Raw's vacant spot by winning a last chance gauntlet match.

The women's match began in the lobby of the building, while the men's match began in the gym. The men and women eventually ran into each other and had a food fight before splitting off to continue their ascent to the roof. The women's match concluded first after Asuka retrieved the women's briefcase, granting her a guaranteed match of her choice for either the Raw or SmackDown Women's Championship. Shortly afterwards, Otis won the men's match by getting the men's briefcase, granting him a guaranteed match for a world championship of his choice; either Raw's WWE Championship or SmackDown's Universal Championship.

The next night on Raw, Raw Women's Champion Becky Lynch announced that she would be going on hiatus. A confused Asuka then came out. Lynch stated that by Asuka winning the women's Money in the Bank ladder match, she actually won the Raw Women's Championship and proceeded to open the briefcase, revealing the title belt inside. Lynch told Asuka that she was pregnant, hence the reason for her hiatus. This in turn became the first time that the champion relinquished the title to the Money in the Bank winner without having a cash-in match.

After winning the men's contract, Otis teased cashing in on Universal Champion Braun Strowman, but decided not to. After entering into a feud with The Miz and John Morrison over the Money in the Bank contract in September, Otis was forced to defend the contract in a match against The Miz at the 2020 Hell in a Cell event in October, where The Miz defeated Otis to win the Money in the Bank contract, thus Otis became the second wrestler to lose his contract in a scheduled match without cashing it in. The Miz then used the contract to cash in on the WWE Championship at TLC: Tables, Ladders & Chairs on December 20. At the event, while Drew McIntyre was defending the title against AJ Styles in a Tables, Ladders, and Chairs match, midway through, The Miz came out and cashed in the contract, converting the match into a triple threat TLC match. Despite this, McIntyre retained. However, on the December 28 episode of Raw, the cash-in at TLC was ruled invalid due to Morrison cashing in the contract on behalf of The Miz, as only the contract holder himself can cash it in, and thus the briefcase was returned to The Miz. At Elimination Chamber on February 21, 2021, The Miz officially cashed in the contract, defeating McIntyre (who had just retained the title in an Elimination Chamber match and was then attacked by Bobby Lashley) to win the WWE Championship for a second time, with both times occurring via Money in the Bank cash-ins.

=== 2021 ===
The 2021 Money in the Bank pay-per-view took place on July 18, at the Dickies Arena in Fort Worth, Texas, marking the first event in the series to be held in Texas, and WWE's first pay-per-view held following their resumption of live touring that began with the July 16 episode of SmackDown. With the event back in front of a live audience, the Money in the Bank ladder matches returned to their regular format with each having eight participants evenly divided between the Raw and SmackDown brands.

Qualification matches for both ladder matches began on the June 21 episode of Raw. For the men's match, Ricochet, John Morrison, Riddle, and Drew McIntyre qualified from Raw, while Big E, Kevin Owens, King Nakamura, and Seth Rollins qualified from SmackDown. Big E would go on to win the men's ladder match, granting him a guaranteed match of his choice for either Raw's WWE Championship or SmackDown's Universal Championship. Big E would then announce via Twitter that he would cash in his contract on the September 13 episode of Raw, becoming the fourth person to announce their cash-in match ahead of time, and would proceed to do so on WWE Champion Bobby Lashley after Lashley had just retained the title against Randy Orton, defeating Lashley to win the title.

For the women's match, Asuka, Naomi, Alexa Bliss, and Nikki A.S.H. qualified from Raw. No qualifying matches took place for SmackDown, and instead, WWE official Sonya Deville appointed the participants: a returning Zelina Vega, Liv Morgan, and WWE Women's Tag Team Champions Natalya and Tamina; Carmella was originally announced for the ladder match but was later removed and replaced by Morgan after receiving an opportunity for the SmackDown Women's Championship. Nikki A.S.H. would go on to win the women's ladder match, granting her a guaranteed match of her choice for either the Raw or SmackDown Women's Championship. The next night on Raw, Nikki cashed-in the contract and won the Raw Women's Championship from Charlotte Flair, who had just retained the title in a match against Rhea Ripley.

=== 2022 ===
The 2022 Money in the Bank took place on Saturday, July 2, 2022, at the MGM Grand Garden Arena in the Las Vegas suburb of Paradise, Nevada; it was originally scheduled to be held at the city's Allegiant Stadium. The ladder matches were scheduled to feature seven participants with an uneven division between the brands; the men's match added an eighth, last minute entrant which evened out the brand division but the women's match had four participants from Raw and three from SmackDown.

Qualifying matches for the men's Money in the Bank ladder match began on the June 10 episode of SmackDown. A qualifier between Drew McIntyre and Sheamus ended in a double disqualification, after both men attacked each other with steel chairs, thus neither qualified. The following week, however, WWE official Adam Pearce announced that both McIntyre and Sheamus would be in the match. Seth "Freakin" Rollins became the first to qualify from Raw after he defeated AJ Styles on the June 13 episode of Raw. The following week, Omos and Sami Zayn became the fourth and fifth entrants after defeating Riddle and Shinsuke Nakamura, respectively. The following week on Raw, Riddle won a Last Chance Battle Royal by last eliminating The Miz to be the sixth qualified entrant, while Madcap Moss won a fatal four-way match on the July 1 episode of SmackDown to become the seventh and (what was thought to be) final entrant in the match. The men's match served as the main event, and just as the match was about to begin, WWE official Adam Pearce announced that Raw's Theory would be added as a surprise eighth entrant, who would go on and win the match. After failed attempts to cash in on the Undisputed WWE Universal Championship, as well as a tease of cashing in on the NXT Championship, Theory finally used the contract to challenge Seth "Freakin" Rollins for the WWE United States Championship on the November 7, 2022, episode of Raw, but failed to win the title due to an attack by Bobby Lashley, allowing Rollins to pin Theory and retain. This marked the first time the contract was used on a non-world championship.

Qualifying matches for the women's Money in the Bank ladder match also began on the June 10 episode of SmackDown. Lacey Evans became the first qualified entrant by defeating Xia Li. The following week on Raw and SmackDown, Alexa Bliss and Liv Morgan defeated Doudrop and Nikki A.S.H. in a tag team qualifier to win two spots in the match, and Raquel Rodriguez defeated Shayna Baszler to earn the fourth spot in the match. The following week on Raw and SmackDown, Asuka and Shotzi became the fifth and sixth qualified entrants after defeating Becky Lynch and Tamina, respectively. The following week on Raw, Becky Lynch won a Last Chance Elimination Match by defeating Doudrop, Nikki A.S.H., Shayna Baszler, Tamina, and Xia Li to become the last qualified entrant. Liv Morgan would go on to win the women's ladder match and later that night, cashed in on SmackDown Women's Champion Ronda Rousey after Rousey had just retained the title against Natalya. Morgan would pin Rousey to win the championship.

=== 2023 ===
The 2023 Money in the Bank event took place on July 1 from The O2 Arena in London, England, marking the first time the show ventured outside of the U.S. The original plan was six participants in both the men's and women's ladder matches—three from each brand—but a wrestler with no brand affiliation was a late addition to the men's match, giving it seven entrants.

Qualifying matches began on the May 29 episode of Raw, with Ricochet defeating The Miz and Shinsuke Nakamura defeating Bronson Reed to become the first entrants in the men's ladder match. On the June 2 episode of SmackDown, LA Knight defeated Montez Ford to gain entry into the men's match, while Zelina Vega defeated Lacey Evans to become the first qualifier for the women's ladder match. On the June 5 episode of Raw, Becky Lynch defeated Sonya Deville and Zoey Stark defeated Natalya to qualify for the women's match. Four qualifying matches took place on the June 9 episode of SmackDown—on the men's side, Santos Escobar defeated Mustafa Ali and Butch defeated Baron Corbin, while on the women's side, Bayley defeated Michin and Iyo Sky defeated Shotzi. On the June 12 episode of Raw, Damian Priest defeated Matt Riddle to qualify for what was thought to be the final spot in the men's match, but on the June 19 episode of Raw, free agent Logan Paul announced that he negotiated his entry into the men's match (without needing a qualifier), to give it seven participants. Priest would go on to win the men's match, while Sky won the women's match.

Iyo Sky would cash in her contract on August 5, 2023, at SummerSlam, defeating Bianca Belair for the WWE Women's Championship (formerly Raw Women's Championship) right after Belair herself had just won the title defeating previous champion Asuka and Charlotte Flair in a triple threat match. At Night 2 of WrestleMania XL, on April 7, 2024, Damian Priest cashed in his contract and defeated Drew McIntyre for the World Heavyweight Championship, right after McIntyre had just defeated Seth "Freakin" Rollins for the title.

=== 2024 ===
The 2024 Money in the Bank event took place on Saturday, July 6, 2024, at the Scotiabank Arena in Toronto, Ontario, marking the first Money in the Bank to be held in Canada and the second to be held outside of the United States, after the 2023 event. The show was promoted as being part of a three-night "Money in the Bank Weekend" event, with the July 5 episode of SmackDown and NXT's July 7 livestreaming show Heatwave also being held at the same venue. The 2024 ladder matches had six participants each, evenly divided between the Raw and SmackDown brands. All of the qualifiers for the two Money in the Bank ladder matches were triple threat matches, which began on the June 17 episode of Raw and were held across subsequent episodes of Raw and SmackDown.

On the men's side, Jey Uso won Raw's first spot by defeating Finn Bálor and Rey Mysterio on June 17, with Chad Gable getting the second spot by defeating Braun Strowman and Bronson Reed on June 24. Drew McIntyre won the final Raw spot by defeating Sheamus and Ilja Dragunov on the July 1 episode of Raw. For SmackDown, the first two spots were claimed on the June 21 episode, with Carmelo Hayes defeating Randy Orton and Tama Tonga, and Andrade defeating Kevin Owens and Grayson Waller. The third and final SmackDown spot was filled on the June 28 episode, as LA Knight defeated Logan Paul and Santos Escobar. At the event on July 6, Drew McIntyre would go on to win the men's match, and later that night, McIntyre cashed in his contract during the World Heavyweight Championship match, where reigning champion Damian Priest was defending the title against Seth "Freakin" Rollins, turning it into a triple threat match, but McIntyre was pinned by Priest due to an attack from CM Punk. This marked the first time someone cashed in their contract on the person who had cashed in on them for the same title.

On the women's side, Iyo Sky claimed Raw's first spot by defeating Kiana James and Zelina Vega on June 17. On the June 24 episode of Raw, Lyra Valkyria defeated Kairi Sane and Shayna Baszler to win the second Raw spot. Zoey Stark won Raw's final spot by defeating Dakota Kai and Ivy Nile on the July 1 episode of Raw. SmackDown's first spot was won by Chelsea Green, who defeated Bianca Belair and Michin on the June 21 episode of SmackDown. The final two SmackDown spots were filled on the June 28 episode, with Tiffany Stratton defeating Jade Cargill and Candice LaRae, and Naomi defeating Indi Hartwell and Blair Davenport. At the event on July 6, Tiffany Stratton would go on to win the women's match and on the January 3, 2025, edition of SmackDown, after Nia Jax had just defeated Naomi to retain the WWE Women's Championship, Stratton, who had been aligned with Jax for months, attacked her and LeRae, then following Jax being hit with a Kiss of Death from Belair, Stratton cashed in her contract and defeated Jax to win the WWE Women's Championship.

=== 2025 ===
The 2025 Money in the Bank event took place on Saturday, June 7, 2025, at the Intuit Dome in Inglewood, California.

Qualifying matches for the men's Money in the Bank ladder match consisted of six triple threat matches held across episodes of Raw and SmackDown, with three spots for each brand. The first qualifier occurred on the May 16 episode of SmackDown where Solo Sikoa defeated Jimmy Uso and Rey Fénix. LA Knight qualified on the following week's SmackDown by defeating Aleister Black and Shinsuke Nakamura. Two qualifiers occurred on the May 26 episode of Raw, where Penta defeated Chad Gable and Dragon Lee, and then Seth Rollins defeated Finn Bálor and Sami Zayn. On that week's SmackDown, Andrade earned SmackDown's final spot by defeating Carmelo Hayes and Jacob Fatu, with Raw's final spot determined on the June 2 episode of Raw where El Grande Americano defeated AJ Styles and CM Punk. At the event on June 7, Rollins would go on to win the men's match. At SummerSlam Night 1, Rollins would cash in his Money in the Bank contract on CM Punk, who had just defeated Gunther for the World Heavyweight Championship, and pinned him to win the title.

Qualifying matches for the women's Money in the Bank ladder match also consisted of six triple threat matches that occurred over episodes of Raw and SmackDown, also with three spots for each brand. Like the men's, qualifiers also began on the May 16 episode of SmackDown where Alexa Bliss defeated Chelsea Green and Michin. The next two qualifiers occurred on the May 19 episode of Raw where Roxanne Perez defeated Becky Lynch and Natalya, and then Rhea Ripley defeated Kairi Sane and Zoey Stark. The fourth qualifier was determined on that week's SmackDown where Giulia defeated Charlotte Flair and Zelina Vega. SmackDown's final spot was then determined on the May 30 episode of SmackDown where Naomi defeated Jade Cargill and Nia Jax, while Raw's final spot was determined on the June 2 episode of Raw where Stephanie Vaquer defeated Ivy Nile and Liv Morgan. At the event on June 7, Naomi would go on to win the women's match. At Evolution on July 13, Naomi cashed in her Money in the Bank contract on Iyo Sky during her Women's World Championship defense against Ripley and pinned Sky to win the title.

=== 2026 ===
The 2026 Money in the Bank event took place on Saturday, October 10, 2026, at the Smoothie King Center in New Orleans, Louisiana.

Qualifying matches for the men's Money in the Bank ladder match consisted of six triple threat matches held across episodes of Raw and SmackDown, with three spots for each brand. The first spot was determined on the September 7 episode of Raw where Bron Breakker defeated Ethan Page and Rey Mysterio. Qualifiers continued on the following episode where Je'Von Evans earned the second spot by defeating Austin Theory and Big Cass. The third spot was determined on that week's SmackDown, where Trick Williams defeated Randy Orton and Rey Fénix. The fourth spot was determined on the September 21 episode of Raw; originally, Solo Sikoa was set to participate in the match, however, the 946 (Royce Keys, Bronco Nima, and Lucien Price) attacked and abducted Sikoa. Raw General Manager Adam Pearce announced Penta as Sikoa's replacement, who went on to defeat Dominik Mysterio and Dragon Lee to qualify. The fifth spot was determined on that week's SmackDown where CM Punk defeated Gunther and Finn Bálor. The final spot was determined on the following week's SmackDown, where Kevin Owens defeated Cody Rhodes and Johnny Gargano. Penta would go on to win the men's ladder match at the event.

Qualifying matches for the women's Money in the Bank ladder match consisted of six triple threat matches held across episodes of Raw and SmackDown, with three spots for each brand. The first spot was determined on the September 7 episode of Raw where Sol Ruca defeated Lyra Valkyria and Maxxine Dupri. Qualifiers continued on the following episode where Lola Vice earned the second spot by defeating Kelani Jordan and Raquel Rodriguez. The third spot was determined on that week's SmackDown, where Jacy Jayne defeated Alexa Bliss and Jade Cargill. The fourth spot was determined on the September 21 episode of Raw where Roxanne Perez defeated Iyo Sky and La Catalina. The fifth spot was determined on that week's SmackDown where Lash Legend defeated Charlotte Flair and Giulia. The final spot was determined on the following week's SmackDown where Tiffany Stratton defeated Candice LeRae and Tatum Paxley. Stratton would go on to win the women's ladder match at the event. At Crown Jewel on November 7, Stratton cashed in her Money in the Bank contract on Chelsea Green for the WWE Women's Championship, after Green defeated Liv Morgan to win the WWE Women's Crown Jewel Championship—Stratton attacked Morgan with her briefcase, then, after Green took down Raquel Rodriguez and Roxanne Perez, Stratton hits Green with her briefcase, and pinned her to win the title.
