= Gagan Singh (composer) =

Gagan Singh is a Canadian film score composer. He is most noted for his work on the 2025 documentary film Singhs in the Ring, for which he received a Canadian Screen Award nomination for Best Original Music in a Documentary at the 14th Canadian Screen Awards in 2026.

He previously won the award for Best Music Composer at the 2022 Tokyo Film Awards, for his work on the short film Black Bag.

He has also served on the board of directors of the Screen Composers Guild of Canada, as assistant director of special projects with the Songwriters Association of Canada, and as an A&R executive for SOCAN.

He was born and raised in Toronto, and is an alumnus of the University of Toronto Scarborough's programs in music and arts management.

== Filmography ==
- Thank You - 2015
- Wendigo - 2016
- Undone - 2016
- The Use of Deadly Force - 2016
- The Matter at Hand - 2016
- Super Zee - 2019
- An International Girl - 2020
- MeHer - 2021
- Black Bag - 2021
- Singhs in the Ring - 2025
