= Homeport (2019 film) =

2019 Canadian documentary film

- French: Port d'attache
- Directed by: Laurence Lévesque
- Produced by: Élise Bois
- Starring: Samuel Normand; Clément Samuel
- Cinematography: Sébastien Blais
- Edited by: Marie-Pier Grignon
- Music by: Maxime Carpentier
- Distributed by: Welcome Aboard
- Release date: April 11, 2019
- Running time: 29 minutes
- Country: Canada
- Language: French

Homeport (French: Port d'attache) is a Canadian short documentary film, directed by Laurence Lévesque and released in 2019. The film centres on Samuel, a man who has been working on a fishing boat owned by Clément, and is preparing to take over as captain of the boat when Clément retires.

== Awards ==
Award	Date of ceremony	Category	Recipient(s)	Result	Ref.
Montreal International Documentary Festival	2019	Best National Short or Medium-Length Film	Laurence Lévesque, Élise Bois	Won	
Prix Iris	2021	Best Short Documentary	Laurence Lévesque, Élise Bois	Nominated	
