= Akash Sherman =

Canadian film director

- Born: 1995 (age 30–31); Edmonton, Alberta, Canada
- Occupation: Film director

Akash Sherman is a Canadian film director.

Sherman was born and raised in Edmonton, Alberta, where his parents were a doctor and a pharmacist. He left Alberta to study filmmaking at Ryerson University (now Toronto Metropolitan University), in Toronto, in 2015.

Sherman was studying film at Ryerson University when he began working on the script for his first feature film, Clara. In 2015, after a year of school, he sold the script and dropped out to make the film, claiming that doing so was his education. On September 10, 2018, CBC News quoted him at the 2018 Toronto International Film Festival saying Clara's premiere "felt like graduation".

Sherman and his family flew to India for the film's showing at the Mumbai Film Festival in October 2018.

In its review of Clara, Scientific American noted Sherman's dedication to scientific accuracy. They quoted Sherman describe an insight he had, in art history class, that famous artists of the past were out creating art, when they were his age, not studying art.

When Seth Needle of Screen Media Films acquired the US streaming rights for Clara, he called Sherman "one of the best young filmmakers to watch today".

Sherman's documentary film Singhs in the Ring, about Punjabi Canadian wrestler Gama Singh and his family, premiered at the 2025 Calgary International Film Festival.
