= Hunter (Heated Rivalry) =

- Heated Rivalry episode
- Episode no.: Season 1 Episode 3
- Directed by: Jacob Tierney
- Written by: Jacob Tierney
- Based on: Game Changer chapters 1–24 by Rachel Reid
- Cinematography by: Jackson Parrell
- Editing by: Véronique Barbe
- Original air date: December 5, 2025
- Running time: 48 minutes

Episode chronology
← Previous "Olympians"	Next → "Rose"

"Hunter" is the third episode of the first season of the Canadian sports romance television series Heated Rivalry, created by Jacob Tierney and based on Rachel Reid's Game Changers novel series. Directed and written by Tierney, the episode was released on Crave on December 5, 2025.

The first season primarily adapts Heated Rivalry (2019), the second novel in the Game Changers series, which tells the story of two rival professional hockey players, Shane Hollander and Ilya Rozanov, whose on-ice animosity conceals a passionate, secret romance. However, the episode shifts focus to fellow player Scott Hunter (François Arnaud) and his developing romance with Kip Grady (Robbie G.K.). Drawing primarily from Reid's first novel Game Changer (2018), the episode expands Scott and Kip's storyline within the broader timeline of the series, while positioning Shane and Ilya in supporting roles.

"Hunter" received largely positive reviews from critics, who praised Arnaud and G.K.'s performances and the episode's willingness to shift focus. While several reviewers expressed reservations about the reduced role of Shane and Ilya, others felt the episode expanded the series' thematic scope and helped shape its overall narrative direction.

== Plot ==
Four months before the 2014 Winter Olympics, Scott stops at a smoothie shop after a run and meets Kip, an employee who recommends a smoothie. Superstitious, Scott begins returning to the shop before each home game to order the same drink, while the two engage in increasingly flirtatious interactions.

As Scott's on-ice performance improves, he continues to lose games while playing away, including matches against Ilya's (Connor Storrie) and Shane's (Hudson Williams) teams, respectively. Following the latter, Scott becomes involved in an on-ice altercation with Shane after making a pointed comparison involving Ilya. Meanwhile, Kip gradually becomes aware of Scott's identity and career, encouraged by teasing from friends and coworkers.

The two reconnect at a fundraiser where Kip is working as a server, after which Scott invites him back to his home. They begin a secret relationship, and Scott asks Kip to move in with him while admitting that he remains closeted. Over the following weeks, they settle into a domestic routine, though Kip increasingly struggles with the secrecy, lying to friends and family to protect Scott.

Kip's friend Elena (Nadine Bhabha) later confronts him about the emotional toll of the relationship. Scott later opens up about his past, revealing that he was orphaned at 12 and found family in hockey. When Scott declines to attend Kip's birthday celebration at a gay bar, Kip leaves Scott's apartment and returns to his father's (Matt Gordon) home, where he breaks down emotionally. In the aftermath, Scott watches from a distance as Kip celebrates his birthday and his acceptance into graduate school with friends.

== Production ==
=== Development and writing ===
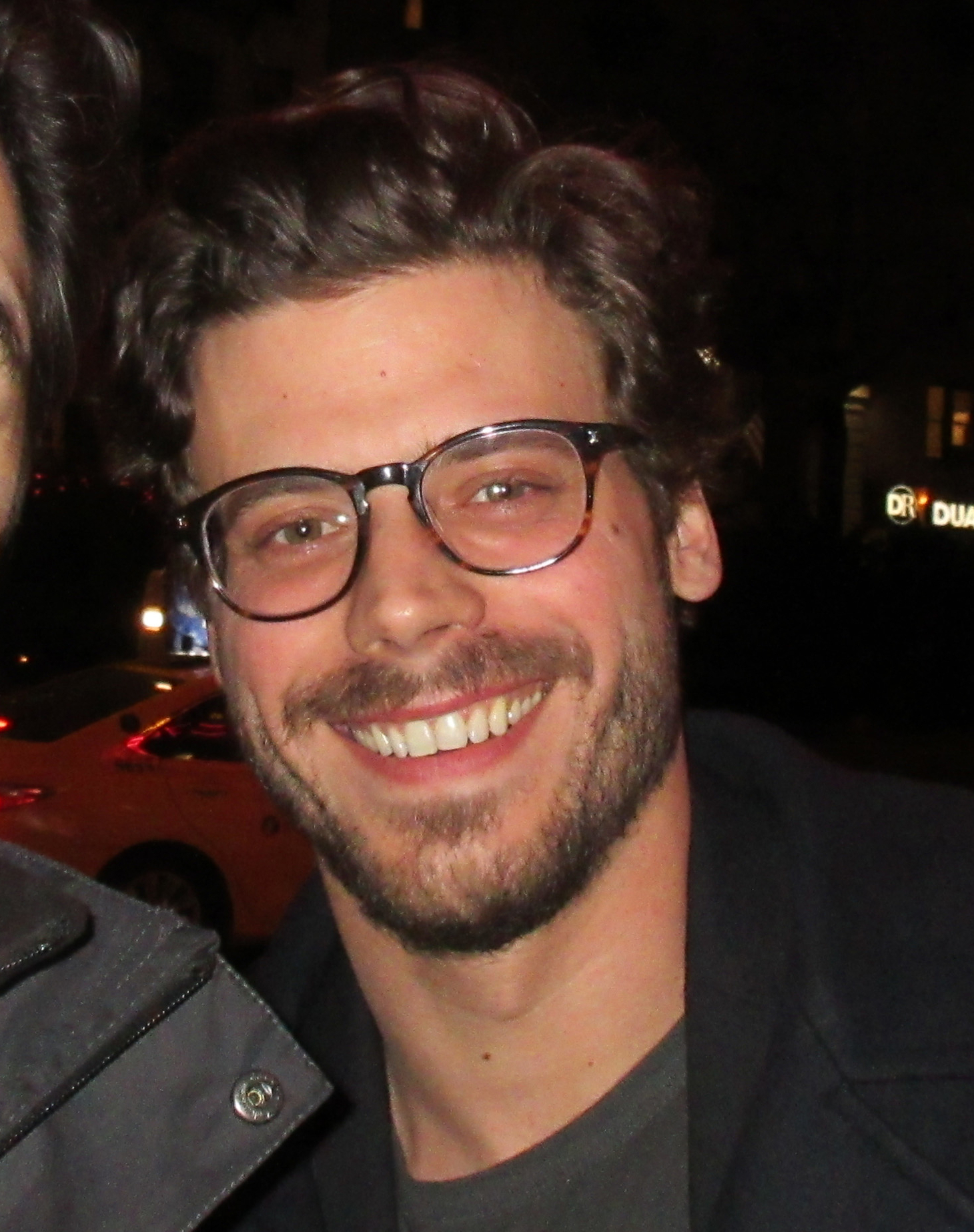
François Arnaud portrays Scott Hunter who becomes the episode's central and titular character following a shift in the narrative focus.

The series was announced in January 2025 as a television adaptation of Heated Rivalry (2019), the second novel in Rachel Reid's Game Changers series, which follows rival hockey players Shane Hollander and Ilya Rozanov whose on-ice competition conceals a secret romantic relationship. While the first two episodes focus primarily on Shane and Ilya, the third episode shifts its narrative attention to Scott Hunter and his relationship with Kip, a different pairing introduced in Reid's first Game Changers novel, Game Changer (2018). In this episode, Shane and Ilya appear only briefly in supporting roles. Jacob Tierney served as the sole writer for the first season.

The episode opens by revisiting a scene from the previous episode set during the 2014 Winter Olympics, in which a discussion about the risks faced by openly gay athletes in Russia prompts Shane to check in on Ilya. Rather than continuing directly from the emotional ending of the second episode, this episode reframes this moment before transitioning its focus to Scott Hunter.

François Arnaud expressed initial concern about the episode's departure from the central storyline, noting that audiences had strongly connected to Shane and Ilya and fearing a negative reaction to the shift in focus. Robbie G.K. echoed similar concern, explaining that both actors were aware the episode represented a tonal and structural change, with a softer, more romantic approach that contrasted with the tension-driven dynamic of Shane and Ilya's relationship. The episode's focus signaled the series' broader intention to draw from multiple novels in the Game Changers series rather than centering exclusively on a single couple.

==== Changes from the source materials ====
Scott and Kip's storyline chronologically predates Shane and Ilya's and serves as the starting point of the franchise. However, the series makes several notable changes to the source material. In the novel, Scott and Kip's relationship unfolds over approximately six months during the 2016–17 NHL season, whereas the series introduces their first meeting earlier, during the 2013–14 MLH season, extending their arc across a longer period. The series also alters Scott's backstory, changing the death of his mother in the novel to the loss of both parents in a car accident, and ages up both Scott and Kip to further distinguish them from the younger central pairing. These changes were made in part to establish Scott and Kip's relationship earlier in the series timeline, ensuring it would not undermine later narrative developments involving Shane and Ilya.

The episode also revises the circumstances of Scott's on-ice fight. In the series, Scott involves in a post-game brawl instigated after Scott provokes Shane following a friendly exchange of trash talk. In the source material, the confrontation instead occurs between Scott and Ilya, after Scott's remarks strike a personal nerve. By shifting the altercation from Ilya to Shane, the series reframes the moment to underscore Shane's uncharacteristic loss of composure and to highlight the extent to which Ilya's influence has begun to alter Shane's behavior.

=== Casting ===
"Hunter" stars François Arnaud as Scott Hunter, Robbie G.K. as Christopher "Kip" Grady, Hudson Williams as Shane Hollander, Connor Storrie as Ilya Rozanov, Nadine Bhabha as Kip's friend Elena Rygg, and Matt Gordon as Kip's father George Grady. The supporting cast includes Kolton Stewart as Scott's teammate Carter Vaughn, Franco Lo Presti as Ilya's teammate Cliff Marleau, Bianca Nugara as Kip's co-worker Maria Villanueva, Brandon Ash-Mohammed as Kip's friend Shawn, and Matthew Finlan as Kyle Swift.

The casting of G.K. was announced in June 2025 alongside Arnaud, Williams, and Storrie, among others. Prior to being cast, Arnaud and G.K. completed a single chemistry read via Zoom and they had not met in person until their first day on set. G.K. later revealed that he initially auditioned for the role of Scott Hunter, noting that the character of Kip "was never initially on [his] radar." He explained that when Tierney later approached him about Kip, he viewed the role as markedly different from Scott but ultimately responded to the script and character description, adding, "I guess it worked out."

=== Filming ===
Principal photography for the first season began in April 2025 and took place over approximately 36 to 37 days. Filming was conducted out of order, with Tierney directing all six episodes.

Filming for the episode took place across multiple locations in Ontario. The Park Hyatt Toronto was featured prominently, with its Presidential Suite used as the setting for Scott's apartment, which Kip temporarily moves into. The hotel had previously appeared in the first episode, where its in-house restaurant Joni was used for the post-MLH Awards party. Relay Coffee Roasters on King William Street in Hamilton was transformed into Straw+Berry, the smoothie shop where Kip works. The Winchester Arms, a British pub in Dundas served as the bar where Kip and his friends gather to watch Scott's hockey games and where Kip later has dinner with Elena. The hockey fundraiser event was filmed at LIUNA Station. All hockey-related scenes, including locker rooms, ice surfaces, and spectator stands, were filmed at the Sleeman Centre in Guelph.

As with the first two episodes, intimacy coordinator Chala Hunter was present throughout production to oversee the staging of intimate scenes. The episode's intimate scenes were filmed over two days and Arnaud and G.K. worked closely with Hunter to establish boundaries and choreograph physical interactions. Arnaud described the set as respectful yet relaxed, noting that Hunter was attentive to the actors' comfort and fostered an environment that aligned with the tone of the series. He also stated that his first in-person meeting with G.K. occurred alongside Hunter.

=== Music ===
The series' musical score was composed by Peter Peter. In addition to its original score, the episode featured several needle drop tracks, most notably "I'll Believe in Anything (song)" by Canadian indie rock band Wolf Parade and "Lips" by English musician Baxter Dury. According to Billboard, the songs' appearance in the episode had led to a surge in official on-demand streaming in the United States.

== Release ==
"Hunter" was released on December 5, 2025, on Crave. Prior to its debut, the series secured multiple international distribution agreements. The episode premiered simultaneously in the United States and Australia via HBO Max, and in New Zealand on Neon. In Spain, the episode and the rest of the season are scheduled to premiere on Movistar Plus+ on February 5, 2026. In the Philippines, the episode, along with the remainder of the season excluding the finale, was released on December 19, 2025, on HBO Max. Additional distribution agreements later brought the first season to Sky and Now in the United Kingdom and Ireland, where it premiered on January 10, 2026.

Unlike other episodes of the first season, the episode's title was not publicly disclosed prior to its broadcast and was deliberately kept secret until it aired. Details regarding the episode's narrative focus on a different couple were also withheld in advance, with the title itself reportedly redacted in pre-release materials.

== Reception ==
"Hunter" was met with largely positive reviews from critics. The review aggregator website Rotten Tomatoes reported a 100% approval rating for the episode, based on seven reviews, with an average rating of 8.1/10.

Mads Misasi of Tell-Tale TV awarded the episode a 4.25 out of 5 rating, praising Arnaud's "nuanced and layered" performance and G.K.'s portrayal of Kip Grady, stating that latter "lives and breathes this character," and arguing that the episode's decision to shift focus away from Shane and Ilya ultimately works by contrasting two couples navigating secrecy within professional hockey. Christine Kinori of The Review Geek gave the episode 4 out of 5 stars, acknowledging frustration among book readers over the condensed adaptation of Scott and Kip's story but commending the performances and chemistry between Arnaud and G.K. Kinori highlighted the episode's exploration of homophobia in sports and argued that Scott's fear of coming out was portrayed as credible and emotionally grounded, concluding that the episode was integral to the broader narrative. Out's Bernardo Sim drew a comparison between Scott Hunter and real-life gay athletes Adam Rippon and Gus Kenworthy, who came out after the 2014 Winter Olympics.

Several critics praised the episode's structural risk. Karl Delossantos of Smash Cut described the episode as a "bold move," arguing that it deepened the show's world-building and reframed the emotional stakes of Shane and Ilya's relationship, while also singling out the performances of Arnaud, G.K., and Bhabha. Dennis Aronov of Collider similarly called the episode a risky but effective narrative detour, noting that Scott and Kip's relationship mirrors the secrecy at the heart of the series' central romance. Writing for Fangirlish, Lissete Lanuza Sáenz stated that while the detour delays Shane and Ilya's story, it is "necessary for the story this show is telling." Terence Johnson of Le Noir Auteur wrote that Tierney's decision to shift focus "pays off in spades," calling it the best-written episode of the series so far and praising its thematic resonance and long-term impact on the season's narrative.

Response was not universally enthusiastic. Kathryn VanArendonk of Vulture praised the episode as a "lovely stand-alone installment" that helps contextualize the series' emotional framework. However, fellow Vulture writer Tom Smyth was more critical, rating the episode 3 out of 5 stars and calling it a "cute but basic" tonal shift following the show's explicit premiere.
