= Rose (Heated Rivalry) =

- Heated Rivalry episode
- Episode no.: Season 1 Episode 4
- Directed by: Jacob Tierney
- Written by: Jacob Tierney
- Based on: Heated Rivalry chapters 12–14 by Rachel Reid
- Cinematography by: Jackson Parrell
- Editing by: Arthur Tarnowski
- Original air date: December 12, 2025
- Running time: 43 minutes

Guest appearance
- Harrison Browne as Connors

Episode chronology
← Previous "Hunter"	Next → "I'll Believe in Anything"

"Rose" is the fourth episode of the first season of the Canadian sports romance television series Heated Rivalry, created by Jacob Tierney and based on Rachel Reid's Game Changers novel series. Directed and written by Tierney, the episode was released on Crave on December 12, 2025.

The first season primarily adapts Heated Rivalry (2019), the second novel in the Game Changers series, which follows rival professional hockey players Shane Hollander (Hudson Williams) and Ilya Rozanov (Connor Storrie), whose on-ice animosity conceals a passionate, secret romantic relationship. The episode's title refers to Rose Landry (Sophie Nélisse) who makes her first appearance in the series and later becomes romantically involved with Shane.

"Rose" received highly positive reviews, with praise directed at its direction, writing, structure, music, character development, and performances of Storrie and Williams, while the club scene was frequently highlighted for its emotional impact.

== Plot ==
Shane and Ilya continue to hook up between 2014 and 2016 alongside their professional success. The Montreal Metros win the championship in 2015 and defend the title the following year, while both men deny to friends that the person they have been privately texting for years is anything serious.

During a visit to Boston, Shane goes to Ilya's home for the first time. Shortly after having sex, Shane says that he should go. Ilya then invites him to stay the night, and Shane reluctantly agrees. Over the course of the afternoon, two share an unusually domestic agenda as they take a nap together and eat a meal that Ilya prepares. Ilya mentions that he is also attracted to women, implying that he is bisexual, before receiving phone calls from Russia that further reveal his father's deteriorating health. As the conversation gives way to intimacy, the emotional closeness unsettles Shane, particularly when they address each other by their first names, prompting him to leave abruptly.

Soon afterward, Shane meets well-known actress Rose Landry and enters a public relationship with her, which provokes jealousy in Ilya. Following a tense game in Montreal, both men later find themselves at the same nightclub with their respective friends. They attempt to suppress their feelings by openly flirting with others, and they feed each other's envy by dancing and making out with women. Afterward, Shane takes Rose home and has sex with her, while Ilya returns home alone and masturbates, with both men imagining each other during their respective encounters.

== Production ==
=== Development and writing ===
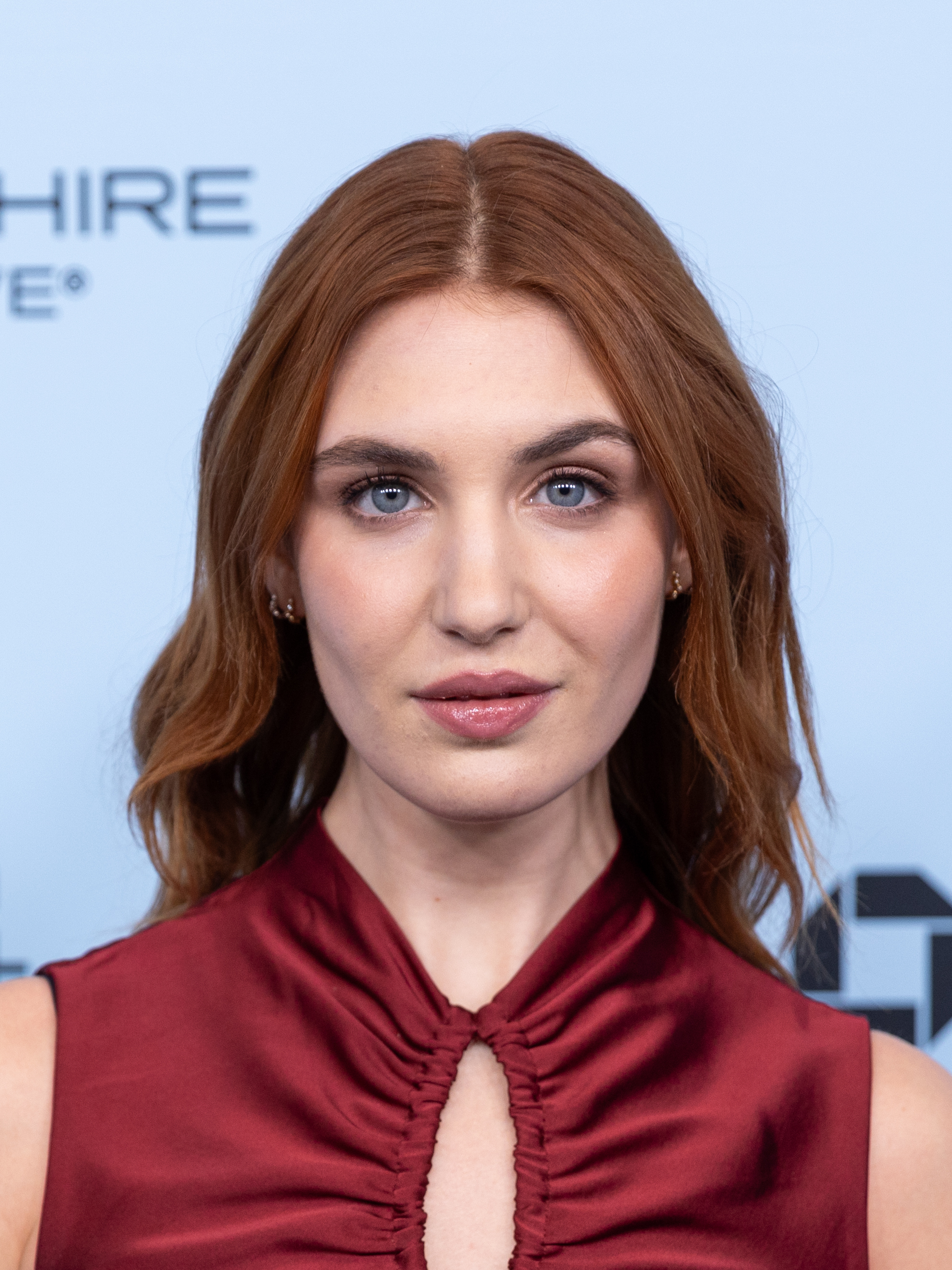
Sophie Nélisse portrays the episode's titular character Rose Landry.

The series was announced in January 2025 as a television adaptation of Heated Rivalry (2019), the second novel in Rachel Reid's Game Changers series, which follows rival professional hockey players Shane Hollander and Ilya Rozanov whose on-ice competition conceals a secret romantic relationship. While the first two episodes focus primarily on Shane and Ilya, the third episode shifts its narrative attention to Scott Hunter and Kip Grady, a different pairing introduced in Reid's first Game Changers novel, Game Changer (2018). This episode marks a return to the series' focus on Shane and Ilya and continues the story following the events of the second episode.

Jacob Tierney served as the sole writer for the first season. The episode's title refers to Rose Landry, an actress introduced in the episode who forms a close bond with Shane and later enters a romantic relationship with him.

After viewers drew comparisons between Shane and Rose and Taylor Swift and Travis Kelce, Tierney clarified that any resemblance was unintentional, stating that the storyline was not inspired by the celebrity couple. He instead cited Jennifer Lawrence's time in Montreal during the filming of the X-Men films as the basis for Rose Landry's character.

==== Changes from the source materials ====
The episode alters the outcome of Shane's storyline following the nightclub sequence. In the novel, Shane returns home alone after leaving the club, breaking down in tears on the side of the road as he confronts his unresolved feelings for Ilya. The series instead depicts Shane acting on his attempt to suppress those feelings by taking Rose home and sleeping with her, while Ilya returns home alone.

=== Casting ===
"Rose" stars Hudson Williams as Shane Hollander, Connor Storrie as Ilya Rozanov, Christina Chang and Dylan Walsh as Shane's parents Yuna and David Hollander, Ksenia Daniela Kharlamova as Svetlana Vetrova, and Sophie Nélisse as Rose Landry. The supporting cast includes Callan Potter and Benjamin Roy as Shane's teammates Hayden Pike and JJ Dagenais, Kamilla Kowal as Hayden's wife Jackie, Franco Lo Presti and Harrison Browne as Ilya's teammates Cliff Marleau and Connors, and Devante Senior as Rose's friend Miles. François Arnaud is credited as starring but does not appear in the episode.

The casting of Nélisse was announced in June 2025 alongside Williams, Storrie, Chang, Walsh, Kharlamova, and Arnaud. Browne, who portrays Connors, is a former professional hockey player and known as the first openly transgender athlete in a professional team sport.

=== Filming ===
Principal photography for the first season began in April 2025 and took place over approximately 36 to 37 days. Filming was conducted out of order, with Tierney directing all six episodes.

Filming for the episode took place at several locations across Ontario. Italian restaurant, Ciao Bella Hamilton, previously featured in the first episode, was reused for Shane's lunch with his parents. Scenes depicting Ilya running through Moscow during the off-season were filmed in front of Dundurn Castle, while sequences of Shane and Hayden running in Montreal were shot along a nearby trail behind the same location. The nightclub Mansion in Hamilton served as the setting for the Russian club scenes featured in the opening montage and later reappeared during the episode's final club sequence. A residential property in Dundas doubled as Ilya's Boston home, where Shane later stays the night. French restaurant, Le Tambour Tavern, also located in Hamilton, was used as the Montreal bar where Shane meets Rose.

All hockey-related scenes, including locker rooms, ice surfaces, and spectator stands, were filmed at the Sleeman Centre in Guelph. Williams was doubled by Jonah De Simone, while Storrie was doubled by Ralph Taggart. De Simone says he suggested the groin stretch that Shane does in the episode and that Williams later demonstrated on The Tonight Show Starring Jimmy Fallon. The hockey sequences required an intensive and carefully scheduled production period. All hockey-related scenes were filmed during a single block later in the shoot, with the cast not stepping onto the ice until approximately the fourth week of production. Williams, Storrie, and Arnaud trained extensively with a hockey coach in preparation for the scenes. Although the on-ice material represents a relatively small portion of the finished episodes, filming these sequences was time-consuming, spanning roughly three full weeks of production.

Due to the episode's extensive sexual content, intimacy coordinator Chala Hunter was present throughout production to oversee the staging of intimate scenes. Hunter worked closely with Tierney, Storrie, and Williams to establish boundaries, choreograph physical interactions, and ensure that scenes were performed safely and consensually. In an interview with GQ, the two actors stated that intimate scenes throughout the series were carefully planned and executed under her supervision, while still allowing for what Hunter described as "artistic interpretation".

In an interview with Vulture, Hunter reflected on how the execution of one of the episode's intimate scenes had a notable emotional impact on the closed set, extending beyond their technical requirements. While she noted that practical considerations, such as concealing simulated physical actions, occasionally led to moments of levity, she emphasized that the scene ultimately resonated deeply with the cast and crew. According to Hunter, the performers' use of eye contact and the inclusion of each other's names underscored a shift in the characters' relationship, signaling growing emotional investment alongside physical intimacy, which she described as both "attractive" and "heartbreaking."

=== Music ===
The series' musical score was composed by Peter Peter. In addition to its original score, the episode featured several needle drop tracks, most notably "My Moon My Man" by Canadian musician Feist and "All the Things She Said" by Russian duo t.A.T.u., which transitions into a remix by British producer Harrison. The songs' appearance in the episode, particularly "All the Things She Said", had reportedly led to increased digital downloads, and on-demand streaming activity in the United States.

Tierney stated that "All the Things She Said" was selected for its cultural and emotional resonance, particularly within queer communities, describing it as "imprinted on us in terms of memory, like a time, a place and a feeling." He explained that the track's history as a Russian pop hit made it especially fitting for the club sequence, capturing what he described as the "sexy, but intense longing" between Ilya and Shane. He added that the transition from the original track into Harrison's remix heightened the emotional impact of the scene.

== Release ==
"Rose" was released on December 12, 2025, on Crave. Prior to its debut, the series secured multiple international distribution agreements. The episode premiered simultaneously in the United States and Australia via HBO Max, and in New Zealand on Neon. In Spain, the episode and the rest of the season are scheduled to premiere on Movistar Plus+ on February 5, 2026. In the Philippines, the episode, along with the remainder of the season excluding the finale, was released on December 19, 2025, on HBO Max. Additional distribution agreements later brought the first season to Sky and Now in the United Kingdom and Ireland, where it premiered on January 10, 2026.

== Reception ==
=== Critical response ===
"Rose" was met with critical acclaim. The review aggregator website Rotten Tomatoes reported a 100% approval rating for the episode, based on six reviews, with an average rating of 7.8/10.

Mads Misasi of Tell-Tale TV gave the episode a perfect 5-star rating, commending its use of a texting montage to bridge the narrative gap between 2014 and 2016, which they described as "a great editing choice" that clearly distinguishes the passage of time from earlier episodes. Misasi noted that the episode further develops Ilya Rozanov's bisexuality and emotional trajectory, observing that his casual relationships with women gradually lose significance over time. They also praised Tierney's writing and direction, singling out the club sequence for conveying Shane and Ilya's emotional conflict "with little to no dialogue", and wrote that Tierney's direction and the performances by Storrie and Williams bring the moment "to life in new ways". Christine Kinori of The Review Geek rated the episode 4.5 out of 5 stars, highlighting its cinematic use of juxtaposed montages and visual symbolism. She wrote that Shane and Ilya's unspoken emotions are conveyed entirely through "their eyes and actions", describing the episode as a turning point in their relationship. Kinori also noted the recurring motif of ginger ale as an example of understated emotional storytelling, emphasizing how Ilya's attentiveness contrasts with Shane's attempts to move on.

Whitney Evans of TV Fanatic argued that the episode reinforces the series' treatment of sex as emotional language rather than spectacle, writing that it showcases the show's "psychological aspect" through scenes such as the club montage and domestic moments between Shane and Ilya. B. J. Colangelo of SlashFilm praised the use of "All the Things She Said" in the club scene, calling it a culturally loaded needle drop that heightens the emotional tension through its full-length placement and strategic lyric alignment, which she described as elevating Tierney's already strong visual storytelling.

Joe Lipsett of Queer.Horror.Movies highlighted the episode's mirrored ending as evidence of Tierney's effectiveness as both writer and director, while Alex V of Q+ Magazine praised the intercut montage of Shane's public relationship with Rose and Ilya's private jealousy, calling it emotionally brutal and citing the episode's pacing and structure as proof of Tierney's sharp creative instincts. Tom Smyth of Vulture awarded the episode four stars, welcoming the renewed focus on Shane and Ilya and singling out the opening montage as an effective depiction of their "long-distance, slow-burn situationship".
