= I'll Believe in Anything =

I'll Believe in Anything may refer to:

- "I'll Believe in Anything" (Heated Rivalry), episode of the television series
- "I'll Believe in Anything" (song), 2005 song by Wolf Parade
