= I'll Believe in Anything (Heated Rivalry) =

- Heated Rivalry episode
- Episode no.: Season 1 Episode 5
- Directed by: Jacob Tierney
- Written by: Jacob Tierney
- Based on: Heated Rivalry chapters 15–22 by Rachel Reid; Game Changer chapter 29 by Rachel Reid
- Cinematography by: Jackson Parrell
- Editing by: Véronique Barbe
- Original air date: December 19, 2025
- Running time: 55 minutes

Episode chronology
← Previous "Rose"	Next → "The Cottage"

"I'll Believe in Anything" is the fifth and penultimate episode of the first season of the Canadian sports romance television series Heated Rivalry, created by Jacob Tierney and based on Rachel Reid's Game Changers novel series. Directed and written by Tierney, the episode was released on Crave on December 19, 2025.

The first season primarily adapts Heated Rivalry (2019), the second novel in the Game Changers series, which follows rival professional hockey players Shane Hollander (Hudson Williams) and Ilya Rozanov (Connor Storrie), whose on-ice animosity conceals a passionate, secret romantic relationship. In the episode, Shane comes out to Rose and ends their relationship, reunites with Ilya during the All-Star Game as Ilya grapples with family loss and fear of being openly involved with a man, and Scott makes a life-altering decision after winning the MLH Cup.

"I'll Believe in Anything" received widespread critical acclaim, with praise for its writing, directing, editing, cinematography, portrayal of intimacy, and performances, particularly those of Storrie, Williams, and Nélisse. Critics singled out several scenes as standouts, especially Shane's coming out scene, Ilya's Russian-language monologue, and the final sequence involving Scott and Kip and its impact on Shane and Ilya's narrative.

== Plot ==
After spending the night with Rose (Sophie Nélisse), Shane tells her that stress has been affecting him and their intimacy. Later that week, they meet for dinner, where Rose questions Shane about their relationship and his sexuality. Shane admits that he is gay, and the two mutually agree to end their romantic relationship. Rose suggests that they remain friends and offers her support, acknowledging the pressures Shane faces as a closeted professional hockey player.

Shane and Ilya reunite in Tampa for the 2017 All-Star Game, where they play on the same team for the first time. During a private conversation, Shane tells Ilya that he and Rose are no longer together, explaining that they were not compatible. The two later reconnect, and Shane goes to Ilya's hotel room, where their conversation becomes more serious. Shane admits that he is gay and says that his feelings for Ilya have deepened, asking if Ilya feels the same. Ilya refuses to acknowledge those feelings and insists that their relationship must remain secret, stating that being openly involved with a man would prevent him from returning safely to Russia. He becomes emotional while speaking about his father's deteriorating health and his late mother, and Shane comforts him before they part.

Soon afterward, Ilya learns that his father has died and returns to Russia, missing a scheduled game in Nashville. In Moscow, he argues with his brother Alexei (Slavic Rogozine) over family obligations and money, leading to a physical confrontation. Ilya then cuts ties with Alexei and makes arrangements to support his niece. Svetlana (Ksenia Daniela Kharlamova) comforts Ilya and tells him that she loves him, while acknowledging that he is in love with "Jane", whom she refers to as "he".

Later, Ilya calls Shane and, at Shane's suggestion, expresses his emotions in Russian, including his grief, anger toward his family, and his love for Shane, though Shane does not understand the words.

After returning to North America, Shane and Ilya face each other as opponents in a Boston versus Montreal game. During the match, Shane is injured and taken to the hospital, leaving Ilya visibly concerned for him. The following day, Ilya visits Shane, who is affected by medication and invites Ilya to spend the summer with him at his cottage. Ilya responds with a hesitant "maybe".

While Shane recovers at his parents' cottage, he and Ilya remain in contact and watch the MLH Cup Final on television. Scott (François Arnaud) leads the New York Admirals to victory and publicly comes out by inviting Kip (Robbie G.K.) onto the ice and kissing him. Inspired, Ilya calls Shane to accept the invitation to his cottage.

== Production ==
=== Development and writing ===
The series was announced in January 2025 as a television adaptation of Heated Rivalry (2019), the second novel in Rachel Reid's Game Changers series, which follows rival professional hockey players Shane Hollander and Ilya Rozanov whose on-ice competition conceals a secret romantic relationship. Jacob Tierney and Brendan Brady serve as executive producers, with Reid attached as a consulting producer. Tierney also acted as the sole writer for the first season.

Hudson Williams described Shane's coming-out scene with Rose as a pivotal emotional moment for the character. He stated that the scene was particularly impactful because it gave Shane space to articulate feelings he is unable to express with Ilya, whom Williams characterized as "an awful communicator." He noted that Rose's openness and empathy provide Shane with a rare sense of safety, emphasizing that her reaction reflects a compassionate response that might not be expected from every romantic partner in that situation.

==== Changes from the source materials ====
The episode expands significantly on Ilya's return to Russia following his father's death. While the novel limits this period largely to Ilya's emotional turmoil and his first profession of love for Shane during a phone call, the series depicts his time in Russia in greater detail, including a final confrontation with his brother Alexei. After Alexei insults Ilya and Svetlana, Ilya physically confronts him and cuts himself off from his remaining immediate family. The episode further revises Ilya and Svetlana's relationship by adding an intimate scene in which she comforts him after the confrontation. Svetlana reassures Ilya that he deserves her friendship and acknowledges his love for Shane, explicitly recognizing that "Jane" is a man. This portrayal indicates that Svetlana was aware of Ilya's bisexuality earlier in the overall timeline, whereas in the book series Ilya comes out to Svetlana in The Long Game (2022), the sequel to Heated Rivalry, which is set to be adapted in the series' second season.

=== Casting ===
"I'll Believe in Anything" stars Hudson Williams as Shane Hollander, Connor Storrie as Ilya Rozanov, François Arnaud as Scott Hunter, Robbie G.K. as Christopher "Kip" Grady, Christina Chang and Dylan Walsh as Shane's parents Yuna and David Hollander, Ksenia Daniela Kharlamova as Svetlana Vetrova, Nadine Bhabha as Kip's friend Elena Rygg, Matt Gordon as Kip's father George Grady, and Sophie Nélisse as Rose Landry. The supporting cast includes Callan Potter and Benjamin Roy as Shane's teammates Hayden Pike and JJ Dagenais, Kolton Stewart as Scott's teammate Carter Vaughn, Franco Lo Presti as Ilya's teammate Cliff Marleau, and Slavic Rogozine as Alexei Rozanov.

=== Filming ===
Principal photography for the first season began in April 2025 and took place over approximately 36 to 37 days. Filming was conducted out of order, with Tierney directing all six episodes.

Filming for the episode took place across multiple locations in Ontario. The Sheraton Hamilton was used for scenes set in Montreal, including moments in which Ilya speaks with his teammate Connors about going out to a club. The hotel had previously appeared in the first episode in scenes involving Ilya. A mansion on Rocmary Place in Vaughan again doubled as Ilya's home in Russia, having been featured earlier in the second episode. French restaurant, Le Tambour Tavern in Hamilton was used for Shane and Rose's dinner scene, following its appearance in the previous episode as a Montreal bar. The rooftop bar and pool at Lavelle in Toronto stood in for a hotel bar and pool where Shane and Ilya reunite prior the All-Star Game. Additional scenes were filmed at the now-closed Trocadero Restaurant in Hamilton, which served as the setting for a dinner scene depicting Ilya's argument with his brother following their father's funeral, while a graffiti-covered pink tunnel at Shamrock Park in Hamilton was used for a phone call between Ilya and Shane after the funeral. All hockey-related scenes, including locker rooms, ice surfaces, and spectator stands, were filmed at the Sleeman Centre in Guelph.

The series required an intensive and carefully scheduled production period for its hockey sequences. All hockey-related scenes were filmed during a single block later in the shoot, with the cast not stepping onto the ice until approximately the fourth week of production. Williams, Storrie, and Arnaud trained extensively with a hockey coach in preparation for the scenes. Although the on-ice material represents a relatively small portion of the finished episodes, filming these sequences was time-consuming, spanning roughly three full weeks of production.

The episode featured extensive Russian-language dialogue, including a four-page monologue performed by Storrie, who had not spoken Russian prior to being cast. Storrie worked intensively with a dialect coach, memorizing the monologue over the course of approximately one week through multi-hour practice sessions. He later explained that once he mastered certain pronunciations and speech patterns, he was able to apply them across the dialogue. Following one take, Tierney reportedly asked the dialect coach which portions of the performance were usable, to which she replied, "All of it. He humbles me."

The argument scene between Ilya and his brother, which also featured Russian dialogue, was among the first such scenes Storrie filmed for the series, while the monologue marked his final Russian-language scene. The episode also marked G.K.'s final day of filming. He later recalled that approximately 50 to 60 background performers were present during crowd scenes, which were subsequently expanded in post-production to create the impression of a full arena.

=== Music ===
The series' musical score was composed by Peter Peter. In addition to its original score, the episode featured several needle drop tracks, most notably "I'll Believe in Anything" by Canadian indie rock band Wolf Parade. The episode's title is derived from the song, which appeared during the climactic final scene. The song had previously appeared in the third episode which centers on Scott and Kip. According to Billboard, the track's inclusion in the series contributed to a global increase in official on-demand streaming.

Arnaud commented on the reuse of the song, stating that he was unaware it would return in the episode and found its reappearance emotionally affecting. He noted that hearing the lyrics again in a new narrative context gave them added resonance, particularly references that echoed themes introduced in the earlier episode.

== Release ==
"I'll Believe in Anything" was released on December 19, 2025, on Crave. Prior to its debut, the series secured multiple international distribution agreements. The episode premiered simultaneously in the United States and Australia via HBO Max, and in New Zealand on Neon. In Spain, the episode and the rest of the season are scheduled to premiere on Movistar Plus+ on February 5, 2026. In the Philippines, the episode, along with the first four episodes, was released on December 19, 2025, on HBO Max. Additional distribution agreements later brought the first season to Sky and Now in the United Kingdom and Ireland, where it premiered on January 10, 2026.

== Reception ==
=== Critical response ===
"I'll Believe in Anything" was met with widespread critical acclaim. The review aggregator website Rotten Tomatoes reported a 100% approval rating for the episode, based on seven reviews, with an average rating of 10/10.

Tom Smyth of Vulture and Mads Misasi of Tell-Tale TV both awarded the episode perfect five-star ratings. Smyth wrote that the episode "brings new depth to both the show and [its] central relationship," noting how it deepens the audience's understanding of both Ilya and Shane. He also praised the absence of explicit sex scenes, arguing that the shift in focus reflects the evolution of their relationship from physical connection to emotional intimacy, and that the series' visual language evolves alongside the characters' emotional growth. Misasi similarly commended Tierney's writing, praising his ability to condense nearly a third of the source novel into a cohesive 55-minute episode, calling the result "special." They highlighted Shane's conversation with Rose as an emotionally efficient arc moving through denial, realization, and acceptance within a single exchange, and praised the use of flashbacks to emphasize Ilya's persistent presence in Shane's thoughts. Misasi also lauded the All-Star Weekend storyline, Storrie's Russian-language scenes, especially the phone call monologue and the confrontation with Ilya's brother, and the final scene, particularly for its cross-cut editing, which underscores the public and private consequences of Shane and Ilya's relationship.

Christine Kinori of The Review Geek gave the episode 4.5 out of 5 stars, describing it as a "cinematic experience." She praised Rose's empathetic handling of Shane's coming out, Svetlana's steadfast support of Ilya, and Ilya's Russian love confession, noting the added tension created by Shane's inability to understand it. Kinori emphasized that both characters acknowledge their desire for more while recognizing Ilya's fear and grief following his father's death, and pointed to Scott and Kip's storyline as a key catalyst for Shane and Ilya's emotional progression. Whitney Evans of TV Fanatic praised the episode's structure and restraint, calling it "heartbreakingly beautiful and hopeful." She highlighted Williams' performance in the dinner scene with Rose, noting his use of facial expression and silence to convey Shane's internal conflict, and praised Storrie's accent work and emotional presence, describing his Russian monologue as "gripping."

Writing for Fangirlish, Lissete Lanuza Sáenz named the episode the best of the year, praising Williams and Storrie's performances alongside the direction, cinematography, lighting, and writing. She described the episode as "a complete hour," highlighting Shane's dinner with Rose, the Tampa hotel room scene, Ilya's monologue, and the final sequence, for their emotional impact and visual storytelling. Fellow Fangirlish writer Lyra Hale echoed this praise, describing the episode as a model for depicting intimacy on television. Hale emphasized that the episode reframes intimacy as emotional attentiveness, vulnerability, and shared presence rather than physicality, arguing that it exemplifies how romance-driven storytelling can resonate deeply without relying on explicit content.

B. J. Colangelo of SlashFilm praised the performances of Williams, Storrie, and Nélisse, and suggested that both the series and Storrie merit Emmy recognition. Colangelo also highlighted Williams' portrayal of Shane's coming out as one of his finest moments, noting how he conveys relief, fear, and vulnerability without dialogue, and described Storrie's Russian monologue as one of the most powerful television monologues of 2025. Cody Schultz of Show Snob described the episode as a "masterclass in storytelling," calling it not only one of the best television episodes of 2025, but one of the greatest episodes in television history.

=== Audience response ===
"I'll Believe in Anything" achieved notable audience recognition. Shortly after its release, it entered IMDb's rankings of highest-rated television episodes, attaining a rare perfect 10 out of 10 rating. For a time, which started on December 20, 2025, it tied with Breaking Bad's "Ozymandias" as the only television episodes to receive a perfect rating on the platform, and ranked among the highest-rated episodes of all time. It currently holds a 9.8 rating on the website, ranking within the top 100 highest-rated television episodes of all time.
