= Rookies (Heated Rivalry) =

- Heated Rivalry episode
- Episode no.: Season 1 Episode 1
- Directed by: Jacob Tierney
- Written by: Jacob Tierney
- Based on: Heated Rivalry Part One by Rachel Reid
- Cinematography by: Jackson Parrell
- Editing by: Arthur Tarnowski
- Original release date: November 28, 2025
- Running time: 49 minutes

Episode chronology
← Previous —	Next → "Olympians"

"Rookies" is the series premiere of the Canadian sports romance television series Heated Rivalry, created by Jacob Tierney and based on Rachel Reid's Game Changers novel series. Written and directed by Tierney, the episode was released on Crave on November 28, 2025, alongside the second episode "Olympians".

The first season primarily adapts Heated Rivalry (2019), the second novel in the Game Changers series, which follows rival professional hockey players, Shane Hollander (Hudson Williams) and Ilya Rozanov (Connor Storrie), whose intense on-ice animosity conceals a secret sexual relationship that develops over several years. The episode's narrative progresses through a series of time jumps, depicting the early stages of their physical relationship alongside their rising careers in professional hockey.

"Rookies" received highly positive reviews from critics, who praised the performances and chemistry of Storrie and Williams, as well as its portrayal of queer intimacy.

== Plot ==
In December 2008, Shane Hollander and Ilya Rozanov meet briefly before facing each other in the International Prospect Cup final, which Russia ultimately wins. Six months later at the Major League Hockey draft, Ilya is selected first overall by the Boston Raiders and Shane second by the Montreal Metros. Later that night, the two encounter one another at the hotel gym, engaging in a silent but competitive workout.

As their professional careers begin, both players face pressure from different directions. Shane is publicly celebrated by his parents and the league, while Ilya endures harsh criticism from his father and growing financial demands from his brother. Over the following year, the two continue to meet sporadically through international tournaments and league events, with the media increasingly framing them as rivals.

Shane and Ilya film a commercial together in summer 2010, with Shane being surprised to discover that it was Ilya's idea. Afterward, the two end up showering in the locker room side-by-side; after both become aroused to each other, they organize a secret sexual rendezvous later that night at Shane's hotel. The two agree to keep the incident private. Despite limited contact afterward, Shane finds himself increasingly preoccupied with Ilya as the league continues to promote their rivalry.

At the 2011 MLH All-Star Game in Nashville, Shane and Ilya are assigned to participate in a joint media appearance. Later, Ilya invites Shane to his hotel room, where they have another sexual encounter. The two agree to meet again during an upcoming game in Montreal and exchange phone numbers, saving each other under the aliases "Jane" (Shane) and "Lily" (Ilya). However, their plans fall through when the Montreal game is cancelled. Ilya then returns to his apartment, where he is visited by Svetlana (Ksenia Daniela Kharlamova), a close friend with whom he has a sexual relationship.

Four months later, Shane is named Rookie of the Year at the MLH Awards. At the after-party, Shane confronts Ilya on a rooftop, believing him to be resentful over the loss. The argument escalates before Ilya impulsively kisses Shane. Startled and afraid of being seen, Shane pulls away and leaves.

== Production ==
=== Development and writing ===
In January 2025, it was reported that Crave was developing a television adaptation of Rachel Reid's novel Heated Rivalry, the second book in her Game Changers series. The story follows two rival hockey stars Shane Hollander and Ilya Rozanov, whose fierce on-ice competition masks a growing secret attraction that complicates their personal lives and professional ambitions. The project was commissioned by Bell Media and produced by Accent Aigu Entertainment, run by Jacob Tierney and Brendan Brady.

Tierney first approached Reid in 2023 to discuss adapting the novels as a limited television series, and later expressed initial doubts about translating the story's sexually explicit material to television. He argued that intimacy was essential to the narrative, describing sex as a key form of character development rather than gratuitous content. During early development, Tierney and Brady said they resisted studio feedback calling for fundamental changes to the story or tone.

Tierney and Brady serve as executive producers, with Reid attached as a consulting producer, while Bell Media holds international distribution rights. Tierney also served as the sole writer for the first season.

==== Differences from the source material ====
The series deviates from the novel by introducing a face-to-face meeting between Ilya and Shane's mother Yuna in the episode, whereas in the book their initial encounter does not occur until the events adapted in the first season finale. Furthermore, the Montreal game does not get cancelled in the novel, and Shane and Ilya's plans do not fall through; Svetlana does not appear in the novels until the events adapted in the episode "I'll Believe in Anything".

=== Casting ===
"Rookies" stars Hudson Williams as Shane Hollander, Connor Storrie as Ilya Rozanov, François Arnaud as Scott Hunter, Christina Chang and Dylan Walsh as Shane's parents Yuna and David Hollander, and Ksenia Daniela Kharlamova as Svetlana Vetrova. The supporting cast includes Callan Potter as Shane's teammate Hayden Pike, Franco Lo Presti as Ilya's teammate Cliff Marleau, Kamilla Kowal as Hayden's wife Jackie, Yaroslav Poverlo and Slavic Rogozine as Ilya's father and brother Grigori and Alexei Rozanov, and Trevor Hayes as the Boston General Manager.

The casting of Williams, Storrie, Arnaud, Chang, Walsh, and Kharlamova was announced in June 2025. During the casting process, Storrie completed chemistry reads with multiple actors, with Williams being the third, after which Storrie recommended Williams to Tierney. Williams later described feeling an "inexplicable X-factor" with Storrie that he had not experienced with another potential co-star. Tierney ultimately became confident in casting the pair following a chemistry read conducted over Zoom, after both actors agreed to take on the series' sexually explicit material. He recalled that Storrie brought the "confidence" and "slyness" he envisioned for Ilya, while Williams embodied the seriousness and emotional restraint he sought for Shane.

Williams said he was initially unsettled by Storrie's performance, believing he was interacting with "a Slavic Russian boy" despite being told Storrie was American, and noted that Storrie's subtle, occasionally off-script choices made the dynamic feel authentic and unpredictable. Prior to being cast, Storrie, who did not speak Russian, undertook intensive preparation before filming, completing four-hour daily language sessions in the three weeks leading up to production to memorise approximately 25 pages of Russian dialogue, much of which was filmed during the first month of shooting. He also worked closely with a dialect coach to develop Ilya's accent.

Arnaud said Tierney personally contacted him about the role, expressing that although it was not written for him, he could not imagine anyone else performing it. Arnaud initially viewed the script as sexually explicit but later came to appreciate how the intimacy served the story. Chang expressed a similar reaction, noting her initial surprise at the explicit material before recognizing its narrative purpose.

=== Filming ===
Tierney served as the director for all six episodes of the first season. Principal photography began in April 2025 and took place over approximately 36 to 37 days. The season was filmed out of order, which Tierney described as "one giant five-hour movie." Storrie and Williams were officially cast approximately one week before production began and relocated to Toronto shortly before filming commenced.

Filming took place across multiple locations in Ontario. The exterior of McMaster University's Burridge Gym was used for Shane and Ilya's first meeting in the episode's opening scene, while the FirstOntario Concert Hall doubled as the venue for the Los Angeles party sequence during the MLH draft. Shane's hotel room following the draft was filmed at the SoHo Hotel Toronto, prior to his visit to the gym. Italian restaurant Ciao Bella Hamilton served as the setting for Shane's lunch with his parents. Scenes set in Ilya's hotel room, including moments of him watching Shane's post-game interview and arguing with his brother over the phone, were filmed at the Sheraton Hamilton. A residential property in Dundas doubled as Ilya's Boston home, while its private gym stood in for the hotel gym where Ilya and Shane meet and talk following the MLH Draft. The Park Hyatt Toronto is also featured, with its in-house restaurant Joni appearing during the post-MLH Awards party. All hockey-related scenes, including locker rooms, ice surfaces, and spectator stands, were filmed at the Sleeman Centre in Guelph.

The series required an intensive and carefully scheduled production period for its hockey sequences. All hockey-related scenes were filmed during a single block later in the shoot, with the cast not stepping onto the ice until approximately the fourth week of production. Arnaud, Williams, and Storrie trained extensively with a hockey coach in preparation for the scenes. Although the on-ice material represents a relatively small portion of the finished episodes, filming these sequences was time-consuming, spanning roughly three full weeks of production.

Due to the episode's extensive sexual content, intimacy coordinator Chala Hunter was present throughout production to oversee the staging of intimate scenes. Hunter worked closely with Tierney, Storrie, and Williams to establish boundaries, choreograph physical interactions, and ensure that scenes were performed safely and consensually. In an interview with GQ, the two actors stated that intimate scenes throughout the series were carefully planned and executed under her supervision, while still allowing for what Hunter described as "artistic interpretation."

In an interview with Vulture, Hunter described how her role extended beyond choreography to managing physical endurance, privacy, and narrative consistency across the episode's most intimate moments. For the shower scene, she noted that logistical concerns such as prolonged exposure to water, temperature control, and performer comfort were central, with the set closed to non-essential crew, strict limits placed on monitors and recording devices, and robes and towels kept on hand between takes. She likened the scene's physicality to stage combat, explaining that movements were built around precise "anchor points" to suggest action on camera while remaining controlled and repeatable. Similarly, the episode's first extended sex scene was carefully broken down beat by beat during rehearsal to ensure that each physical interaction aligned with the characters' emotional progression, allowing the actors to move freely within a clearly defined structure. Hunter also cited the rooftop kiss as an example of her focus on narrative alignment, noting that intimacy needed to reflect where the characters were emotionally at that point in the story, rather than the actors' growing familiarity after weeks of filming.

=== Post-production ===
During post-production, the opening meeting scene between Shane and Ilya was significantly re-edited to better reflect Shane's reserved characterization and establish the tone of their relationship. The scene was originally filmed as a six-minute exchange in which Shane nervously filled the silence with awkward small talk, but Tierney ultimately reduced it to approximately 30 seconds, determining that the longer version felt out of character. By limiting the interaction to Shane's brief introduction of Ilya, Tierney emphasized the weight of their first encounter and allowed it to carry greater narrative significance throughout the series, despite the extended version being well received during filming.

Editor Arthur Tarnowski revealed that the scene was originally supposed to be cut entirely, but editors working on the series trailer managed to convince Tierney to keep it.

=== Music ===
The series' musical score was composed by Peter Peter. In addition to its original score, the episode featured several needle drop tracks, most notably "Sealion" by Canadian musician Feist. According to Billboard, the song's appearance in the episode had led to a surge in official on-demand streaming in the United States. The episode also includes the song "No Feedback" by Dan Kanvis, which appears in the bar scene with Shane and Scott, following the Rookie of the Year ceremony.

== Release ==
"Rookies" premiered on November 28, 2025, on Crave, where it was released alongside the second episode "Olympians". The premiere date was announced with the release of the series' official trailer on October 9.

Prior to its debut, the series secured multiple international distribution agreements. In the United States and Australia, the first two episodes premiered simultaneously with Crave via HBO Max. In New Zealand, the series is streaming on Sky-owned Neon, with the two episodes released on November 30, 2025. In Spain, the episode and the rest of the season are scheduled to premiere on Movistar Plus+ on February 5, 2026. In the Philippines, the episode, along with the remainder of the season excluding the finale, was released on December 19, 2025, on HBO Max. Additional distribution agreements later brought the series to Sky and Now in the United Kingdom and Ireland, where the entire first season premiered on January 10, 2026.

== Reception ==
=== Critical response ===
"Rookies" was met with highly positive reviews from critics. Mads Misasi of Tell-Tale TV gave the episode a perfect 5-star rating, singling out Williams and Storrie for their ability to convey the characters' internal conflicts through subtle, wordless performances, calling the casting "perfect" for how fully the two actors embody Shane and Ilya. Christine Kinori of The Review Geek awarded the episode 4.5 out of 5 stars, commending the adaptation for delivering "that sizzling chemistry that fans of the book wanted to see," while also engaging with themes such as homophobia in sports, vulnerability, and sexual identity. Kinori wrote that the series "does an exemplary job blending the steamy romance with real-life issues that people, especially in the LGBTQ community, can relate to."

Writing for Fangirlish, Lissete Lanuza Sáenz described the first episode as a solid introduction to Shane and Ilya's story, noting that while the pacing and time jumps may feel abrupt for viewers unfamiliar with the source material, the chemistry between the characters carries the narrative. Sáenz also highlighted its depiction of queer intimacy as "rarely portrayed as realistically and in such a vulnerable manner," arguing that "this isn't just sex," but rather "two people communicating through touch what they can't say with words," and praised Williams and Storrie's performances.

=== Audience viewership ===
Upon its two-episode premiere, Heated Rivalry ranked fourth on JustWatch's television streaming chart during the week of December 7, 2025. Meanwhile, Whip Media, drawing on data from its TV Time viewership tracking platform of more than 25 million users, reported that the series placed sixth during the same period. According to FlixPatrol, which aggregates streaming performance data, the series ranked second on HBO Max's Top 10 most-watched series chart in the United States and Australia on November 29, behind It: Welcome to Derry.
