= The Cottage (Heated Rivalry) =

- Heated Rivalry episode
- Episode no.: Season 1 Episode 6
- Directed by: Jacob Tierney
- Written by: Jacob Tierney
- Based on: Game Changer epilogue by Rachel Reid; Heated Rivalry chapters 23–26 by Rachel Reid
- Cinematography by: Jackson Parrell
- Editing by: Véronique Barbe
- Original air date: December 26, 2025
- Running time: 51 minutes

Episode chronology
← Previous "I'll Believe in Anything"	Next → —

"The Cottage" is the sixth and final episode of the first season of the Canadian sports romance television series Heated Rivalry, created by Jacob Tierney and based on Rachel Reid's Game Changers novel series. Directed and written by Tierney, the episode was released on Crave on December 26, 2025.

The first season primarily adapts Heated Rivalry (2019), the second novel in the Game Changers series, which follows rival professional hockey players Shane Hollander (Hudson Williams) and Ilya Rozanov (Connor Storrie), whose on-ice animosity conceals a passionate, secret romantic relationship. In the episode, Shane and Ilya spend their summer at Shane's cottage, where they confront their fears about family, secrecy, and their future together. After they are caught by Shane's father, Shane comes out to his parents and openly acknowledges his relationship with Ilya.

"The Cottage" is the first episode of the series that does not feature any on-ice hockey scenes. The episode received widespread critical acclaim, with reviewers praising its writing and performances of Williams and Storrie, as well as its focus on queer joy, intimate character moments, and a romantic resolution that favored emotional payoff. Many critics also singled out Shane's conversation with his mother, a scene not present in the novel, as a necessary addition that strengthened the episode's emotional and narrative impact.

== Plot ==
Kip (Robbie G.K.) and his friends watch on television as Scott (François Arnaud) accepts the MLH Most Valuable Player Award. Scott makes a speech on his decision to come out of the closet, acknowledging Kip at the end of his speech.

Fast forward to July. Shane picks up Ilya from the airport and drives him to his cottage, where they plan to spend two weeks together in private. At the cottage, Shane and Ilya admit that neither has been with anyone else since they last saw each other months prior, and agree to be honest with one another during their time at the cottage.

As the days pass, Ilya opens up about his family, including the trauma surrounding his mother's suicide. Shane, in turn, speaks about his parents and his fear of coming out to them. Ilya encourages Shane to be truthful, while Shane reassures Ilya about his past relationship with Rose. Their growing closeness leads Ilya to suggest marrying Svetlana in order to secure American citizenship, but the idea visibly upsets Shane.

Shane later proposes a plan that would allow them to remain together while protecting their careers: reframing their rivalry as a friendship, launching a charity, and having Ilya pursue a transfer to a Canadian team, allowing him to live closer to Shane. Moved by Shane's commitment, the two finally confess their love for each other.

Their time at the cottage is interrupted when Shane's father David (Dylan Walsh) arrives unexpectedly to collect a phone charger. When David sees Shane and Ilya kissing, he immediately leaves. Shane becomes immediately distressed and worries about how his parents will react, but Ilya insists on supporting him and accompanies Shane to speak with his parents. Shane comes out to them and explains his relationship with Ilya, much to their shock. Shane's mother Yuna (Christina Chang) later apologizes for not creating a safe environment for him to come out sooner. Later, during a family meal, Shane has a minor panic attack and while comforting him, Ilya refers to himself as his boyfriend for the first time. They discuss their relationship and future plans with Shane's parents.

Afterwards, Shane and Ilya return to the cottage and plan a dinner with Shane's parents.

== Production ==
=== Development and writing ===
The series was announced in January 2025 as a television adaptation of Heated Rivalry (2019), the second novel in Rachel Reid's Game Changers series, which follows rival professional hockey players Shane Hollander and Ilya Rozanov whose on-ice competition conceals a secret romantic relationship. Jacob Tierney and Brendan Brady serve as executive producers, with Reid attached as a consulting producer. Tierney also acted as the sole writer for the first season.

Hudson Williams described the episode as emotionally challenging to read, stating that he approached the script without prior familiarity with the novel or knowledge of its ending. In an interview with Glamour, he recalled being surprised by several moments in the script, including Ilya's mention of potentially marrying Svetlana, which he said felt distressing when read from Shane's perspective. Williams also identified Shane's suggestion to start a mental health foundation as a meaningful moment, noting that the gesture reflects Shane's pragmatic way of expressing care rather than a conscious attempt at emotional vulnerability.

In a separate interview with Variety, Williams discussed the scene in which Shane and Ilya exchange "I love you" for the first time. He explained that although Shane does not say the words first, the character's actions throughout the episode, particularly his long-term thinking about their future, function as an implicit declaration of love. Williams noted that this behavioral shift was intentional and emphasized that Shane's actions help create the emotional space for Ilya to articulate his feelings aloud.

Connor Storrie addressed the scene in which Ilya speaks about his mother's death by suicide, describing it as foundational to his portrayal of the character. In an interview with W Magazine, Storrie stated that Ilya's unresolved grief and the family's refusal to openly address the loss informed his performance throughout the series, particularly in moments of emotional restraint and conflict.

==== Differences from the source material ====
The episode introduces an original scene between Shane and his mother Yuna that does not appear in the novel. Following Shane's coming out, the two speak privately outside the cottage, where Shane expresses guilt and fear that he has disappointed her. Yuna immediately apologizes for not making him feel safe enough to come out to her sooner. Tierney stated that the scene was added because Shane and Yuna share similarly internalized emotional struggles, and he felt it was important for them to have a moment alone, both to acknowledge what had occurred and to establish Yuna's significance in future storylines. Tierney also revealed that the scene was rewritten multiple times during filming and ultimately pared down to its simplest emotional core, which he identified as Shane's admission that he "really tried." Williams later described the scene as particularly personal, noting that it resonated with his own experiences growing up in an Asian family and that Yuna's response provided a cathartic emotional release he had not initially expected while filming. Christina Chang, who portrays Yuna, similarly recalled that reading the scene was emotionally affecting and continued to move her throughout production.

The finale also omits the novel's epilogue, which depicts Shane and Ilya holding a joint press conference to announce a charitable foundation, Shane's teammate Hayden learning of their relationship, Shane coming out publicly to his team, and Ilya joining the Ottawa Centaurs. Tierney explained that the decision was made to preserve the emotional resolution of the story rather than extend it with additional narrative information, particularly given the uncertainty surrounding a potential second season at the time. Instead, the episode concludes shortly after Shane and Ilya leave Shane's parents' cottage, returning together to Shane's own cottage, ending the series on a note of intimacy and contentment rather than public disclosure.

=== Casting ===
"The Cottage" stars Hudson Williams as Shane Hollander, Connor Storrie as Ilya Rozanov, François Arnaud as Scott Hunter, Robbie G.K. as Christopher "Kip" Grady, Christina Chang and Dylan Walsh as Shane's parents Yuna and David Hollander, and Nadine Bhabha as Kip's friend Elena Rygg. The supporting cast includes Bianca Nugara as Maria Villanueva, Brandon Ash-Mohammed as Shawn, and Matthew Finlan as Kyle Swift. Ksenia Daniela Kharlamova and Sophie Nélisse are credited as starring but do not appear in the episode.

=== Filming ===
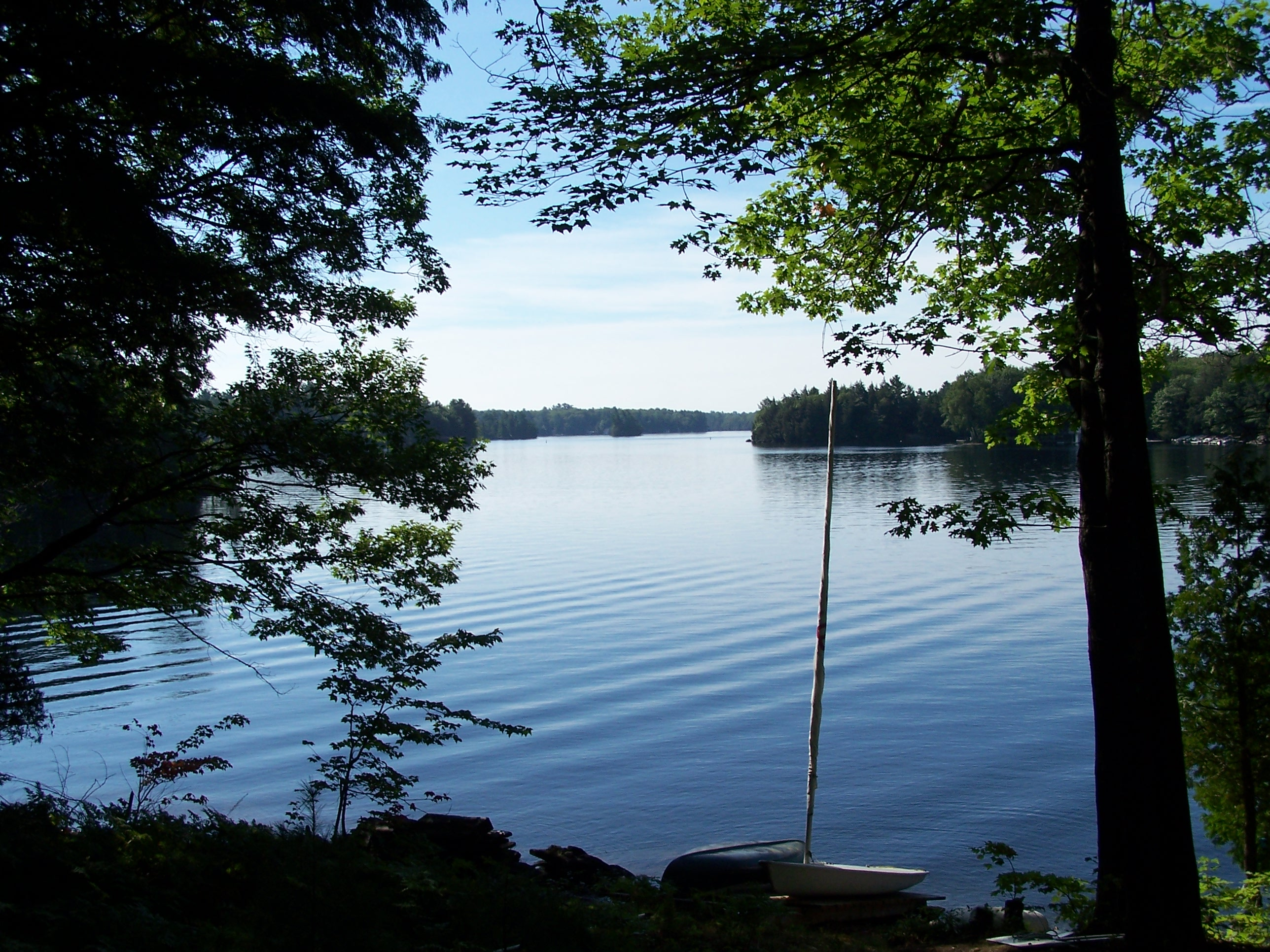
Lake Muskoka served as the filming location for scenes set at Shane's cottage and its surrounding areas.

Principal photography for the first season began in April 2025 and lasted approximately 36 to 37 days. Filming was conducted out of order, with Tierney directing all six episodes.

Filming for the episode took place across several locations in Ontario. The opening scene featuring Scott Hunter's MVP speech was filmed at the FirstOntario Concert Hall, which had previously been used for the Los Angeles party sequence after the MLH draft in the first episode and the MLH Awards ceremony in the second episode. All scenes set at Shane's cottage were filmed in Muskoka Lakes, using a private residence designed by Toronto-based architect Trevor McIvor.

Tierney stated that selecting the cottage location was a lengthy process that required balancing logistical considerations with character authenticity. He ultimately chose the Muskoka property despite it being smaller than initially envisioned, explaining that its scale felt appropriate for Shane's character and personal life.

The episode features several extended single-take shots, including Shane and Ilya's arrival at the cottage and the moment following Shane's father witnessing them kissing. Scenes at the cottage were filmed during the final two days of production, with the last scene shot being Shane and Ilya's conversation by the fire. Williams described it as "a beautiful place to end." In contrast, the driving sequence leading to the cottage was filmed within the first three weeks of the shoot.

Tierney revealed that a moment during an intimate scene involving Shane and Ilya on the couch included an improvised physical gesture by Storrie that was retained in the final cut. Tierney explained that the unscripted choice reflected the evolving comfort and playfulness of the characters' relationship and contributed to the scene's authenticity and tonal variety. Williams later recalled that the improvisation emerged organically during rehearsal and was approved by both Tierney and intimacy coordinator Chala Hunter, noting that it helped convey the characters' growing ease with one another.

A key dialogue scene between Shane and Ilya at the cottage when Ilya proposes the idea of marrying Svetlana was reshot after a rainstorm disrupted sound recording due to the house's glass-heavy structure. Similarly, Shane's private conversation with his mother was filmed over two days after weather interruptions prompted Tierney to substantially rewrite the scene. Williams stated that the revised version clarified the emotional intent and aligned more closely with Tierney's vision of parental support and generational change.

The final shot of Shane and Ilya driving back to Shane's cottage was filmed multiple times to adjust its tone. Initial takes were more somber, but Tierney encouraged the actors to emphasize lightness and intimacy, reflecting the episode's resolution. The final version incorporates a brief, playful exchange between the characters, which Tierney retained to underscore Shane's emotional openness and the tentative optimism of their relationship moving forward.

=== Closing credits sequence ===
Unlike previous episodes, which end on a black screen, the episode features a distinct closing credits sequence that plays over a continuous shot of Shane and Ilya driving back to Shane's cottage. Accompanied solely by the closing track, the scene lingers on the characters as they sit together during golden hour.

Tierney explained that the decision to let the scene continue uninterrupted through the end credits was intentional from the outset. He stated that he wanted the episode to conclude with "movie credits," both to prevent viewers from skipping ahead and to ensure that the cast and crew received visible recognition for their work. Tierney emphasized that presenting the credits in an engaging visual context encouraged audiences to remain present with the story while also acknowledging the people who made the series.

In an interview with TheWrap, Tierney reiterated that the sequence was designed to honor the production team and reflect the cinematic approach taken throughout the season. He described the scene as deliberately simple and heartfelt, noting that it allowed viewers to watch Shane and Ilya share a quiet, affectionate moment while reading the credits, reinforcing the episode's emotional resolution.

=== Music ===
The series' musical score was composed by Peter Peter. In addition to its original score, the episode featured several needle drop tracks, most notably "Bad Things" by American musician Cailin Russo, which featured during the end credits. According to Billboard, the song's appearance in the episode had led to a surge in official on-demand streaming in the United States.

== Release ==
"The Cottage" was released on December 26, 2025, on Crave. Prior to its debut, the series secured multiple international distribution agreements. The episode premiered simultaneously in the United States, Australia, and the Philippines via HBO Max, and in New Zealand on Neon. In Spain, the episode and the rest of the season premiered on Movistar Plus+ on February 5, 2026. Additional distribution agreements later brought the first season to Sky and Now in the United Kingdom and Ireland, where it premiered on January 10, 2026.

== Reception ==
=== Critical response ===
"The Cottage" was met with widespread critical acclaim. The review aggregator website Rotten Tomatoes reported a 100% approval rating for the episode, based on eight reviews, with an average rating of 8.8/10.

Whitney Evans of TV Fanatic and Mads Misasi of Tell-Tale TV both awarded the episode perfect 5-star ratings. Evans described the finale as "heartbreakingly beautiful and hopeful," praising its quieter emotional approach and the performances of Storrie and Williams, noting that the finale allows both actors to convey emotional breakthroughs through stillness rather than dialogue. She highlighted Shane's conversation with his parents, particularly the private exchange with his mother, calling it "a gut-punch in the most profoundly satisfying way," and commended the decision to end the season with romantic resolution rather than manufactured tension. Similarly, Misasi wrote that "if the rest of the season has been nearly perfect, this finale just enhances that to a higher degree," lauding the care given to the characters throughout the season and singling out Storrie and Williams for their delicate performances in both the coming-out scenes and the quiet aftermath, which they described as a "masterclass" in physical acting. They also praised the added scene between Shane and his mother, arguing that while absent from the novel, it was "absolutely needed" in the adaptation due to the series' emphasis on Shane's cultural background and emotional pressures.

Christine Kinori of The Review Geek gave it a rating of 4.5 out of 5 stars, describing the finale as "perfectly overwhelming" and the cottage setting as a space that allows Shane and Ilya to be emotionally vulnerable with one another. She also highlighted the performances of Williams and Storrie, writing that their facial expressions "convey the depth of the couple's emotional breakthrough." Tom Smyth of Vulture rated the episode 4 out of 5 stars, praising its writing, character development, and emotional payoff. He argued that the series benefits from presenting a wider range of queer stories, writing that "the more stories there are like Heated Rivalry, for all its peaks and valleys, the better," as it allows individual narratives to feel less burdened while enabling more viewers to feel seen.

Writing for Fangirlish, Lissete Lanuza Sáenz described the episode as a quieter but deeply affecting hour, praising Williams and Storrie for delivering performances that "feel like a punch in the gut, the good way." She argued that the finale succeeds by embracing queer joy rather than narrative punishment, particularly in its attention to small, intimate moments, and called Shane's emotional openness Williams' "finest moment in the [series] so far." Ana Dumaraog of Screen Rant praised the episode for delivering emotional payoff through understated, domestic moments, calling it "indulgent TV at its finest." She also highlighted the added conversation between Shane and his mother as a meaningful deviation from the novel that strengthens the season's emotional core.

Ariel Messman-Rucker of Pride wrote that the episode succeeds not only through its lead performances, but through its willingness to foreground queer joy and moments of genuine connection alongside the realities of closeted life. Justin Carreiro of In Between Drafts described the episode as a "touching and emotionally enriching" season finale, praising its structure and writing, and calling it "an exceptional ending to the first season." Joe Lipsett of Queer. Horror. Movies. summarized the episode as one that "offers emotional catharsis, hints at where the story could go, and sums up the previous episodes in a satisfying way."

=== Accolades ===
For their performances in the episode, Storrie and Williams were named "Performers of the Week" by TVLine for the week of December 27, 2025. Writing for the website, Andy Swift praised the two for working in "perfect synchronicity," calling their work in the finale "incredible" and highlighting the strength of their on-screen chemistry. He wrote that their performances never felt like "two actors at work," but rather like witnessing a relationship unfold naturally, singling out their ability to convey emotional intimacy through both playful moments and quiet vulnerability. Swift also praised the actors' physical performances, particularly their use of facial expressions, silence, and restrained emotional shifts. He further commended Williams' reaction during the coming out scene, while noting that Storrie's steady presence reinforced the sense of partnership between the characters.
