= Heated Rivalry =

Canadian sports romance television series

- Genre: Sports; Romance
- Created by: Jacob Tierney
- Based on: Game Changers by Rachel Reid
- Written by: Jacob Tierney
- Directed by: Jacob Tierney
- Starring: François Arnaud; Hudson Williams; Connor Storrie; Christina Chang; Ksenia Daniela Kharlamova; Dylan Walsh; Robbie G.K.; Nadine Bhabha; Matt Gordon; Sophie Nélisse; (See full cast list)
- Opening theme: "Rivalry" by Peter Peter
- Composer: Peter Peter
- Country of origin: Canada
- Original languages: English; Russian
- No. of seasons: 1
- No. of episodes: 6

Production
- Executive producers: Jacob Tierney; Brendan Brady; Justin Stockman
- Producer: Lori Fischburg
- Cinematography: Jackson Parrell
- Editors: Arthur Tarnowski; Véronique Barbe
- Camera setup: Dual-camera
- Running time: 43–55 minutes
- Production companies: Accent Aigu Entertainment; Bell Media

Original release
- Network: Crave
- Release: November 28, 2025 – present

Heated Rivalry is a Canadian sports romance television series created, written, and directed by Jacob Tierney for Crave. Based on the Game Changers book series by Rachel Reid, the show takes its title from the 2019 second installment. It stars Hudson Williams as Shane Hollander and Connor Storrie as Ilya Rozanov, two professional hockey players who maintain a secret long-term romantic relationship while playing for rival teams. The ensemble cast includes François Arnaud, Robbie G.K., Christina Chang, Ksenia Daniela Kharlamova, Sophie Nélisse, and Dylan Walsh.

Produced by Accent Aigu Entertainment and Bell Media, principal photography took place throughout Ontario; Hamilton served as a primary filming hub, standing in for locations such as New York and Moscow. Notable filming sites include Dundurn Castle, the FirstOntario Concert Hall, and the Sleeman Centre in Guelph for all on-ice sequences. The series had its preview screening at the Image+Nation LGBTQ+ Film Festival in Montreal on November 23, 2025. The first season premiered on Crave on November 28, with a simultaneous release on HBO Max in the United States, which had acquired the series for international distribution prior to the Canadian premiere. Prior to the first season's conclusion, Crave announced that a second season was in development, currently set for a Spring 2027 release, and intended to adapt Reid's 2022 sequel novel, The Long Game.

Heated Rivalry received critical acclaim, with particular praise for Tierney's direction, the writing, and the performances and chemistry between lead actors. It became the most-watched original series on Crave and was reported as the highest-performing acquired, non-animated debut on HBO Max. The series has received numerous accolades. At the 14th Canadian Screen Awards, the series swept all of its categories, including Best Drama Series and Best Lead Performance in a Drama Series for Williams. It has also won a Peabody Award, a GLAAD Award, and the Television Critics Association Award for Program of the Year. Media outlets have described the series as a global sensation and a break-out hit.

== Premise ==
Shane Hollander and Ilya Rozanov are two professional ice hockey players who compete on rival fictional Major League Hockey teams, the Montreal Metros and Boston Raiders. (Note: This is based on the real-life rivalry between the Montreal Canadiens and Boston Bruins in the National Hockey League.) Although their on-ice rivalry is amplified by media coverage and public perception, the two develop a private, initially casual sexual relationship that continues intermittently over several years as they pursue their careers.

== Cast and characters ==
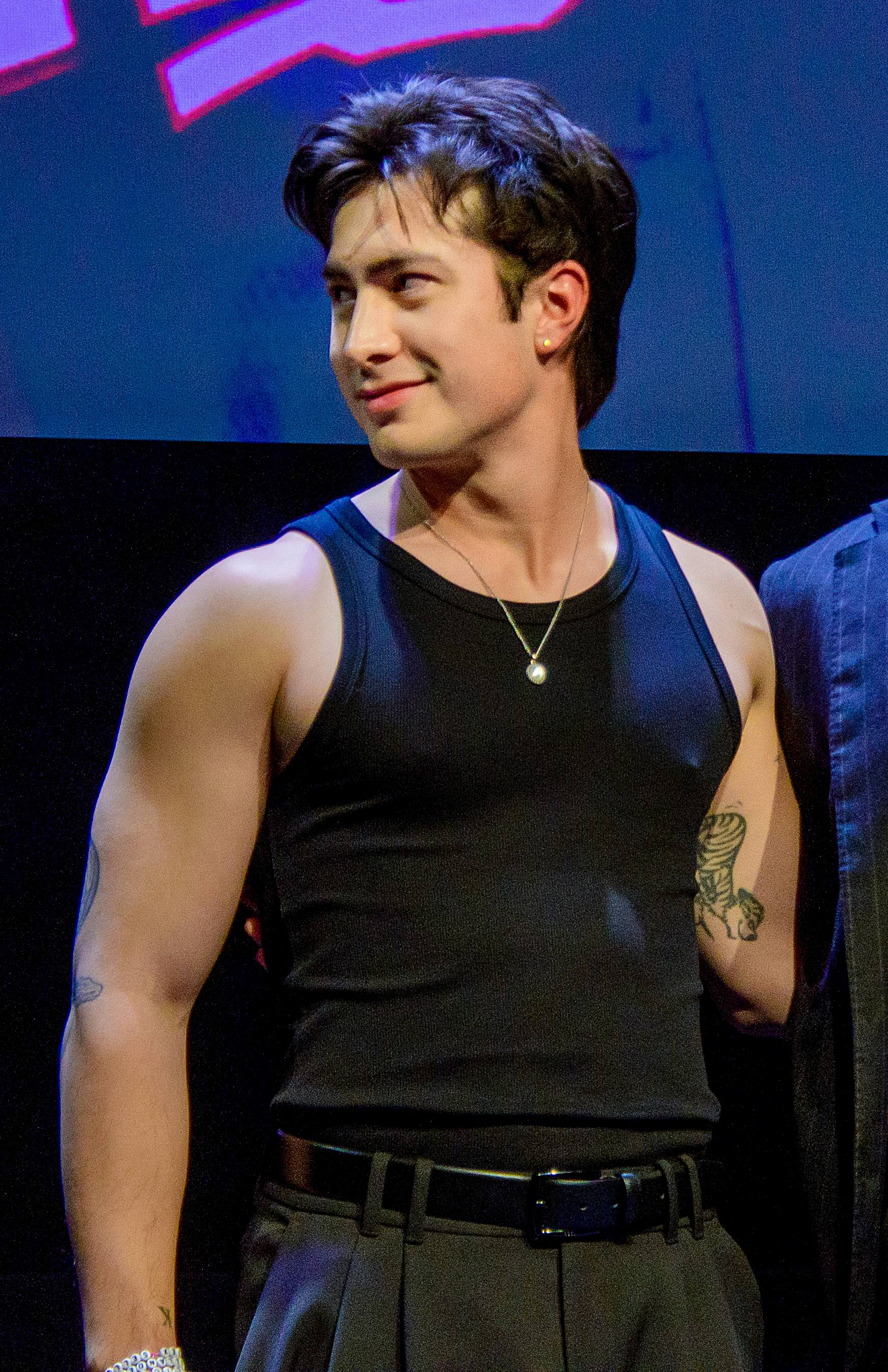
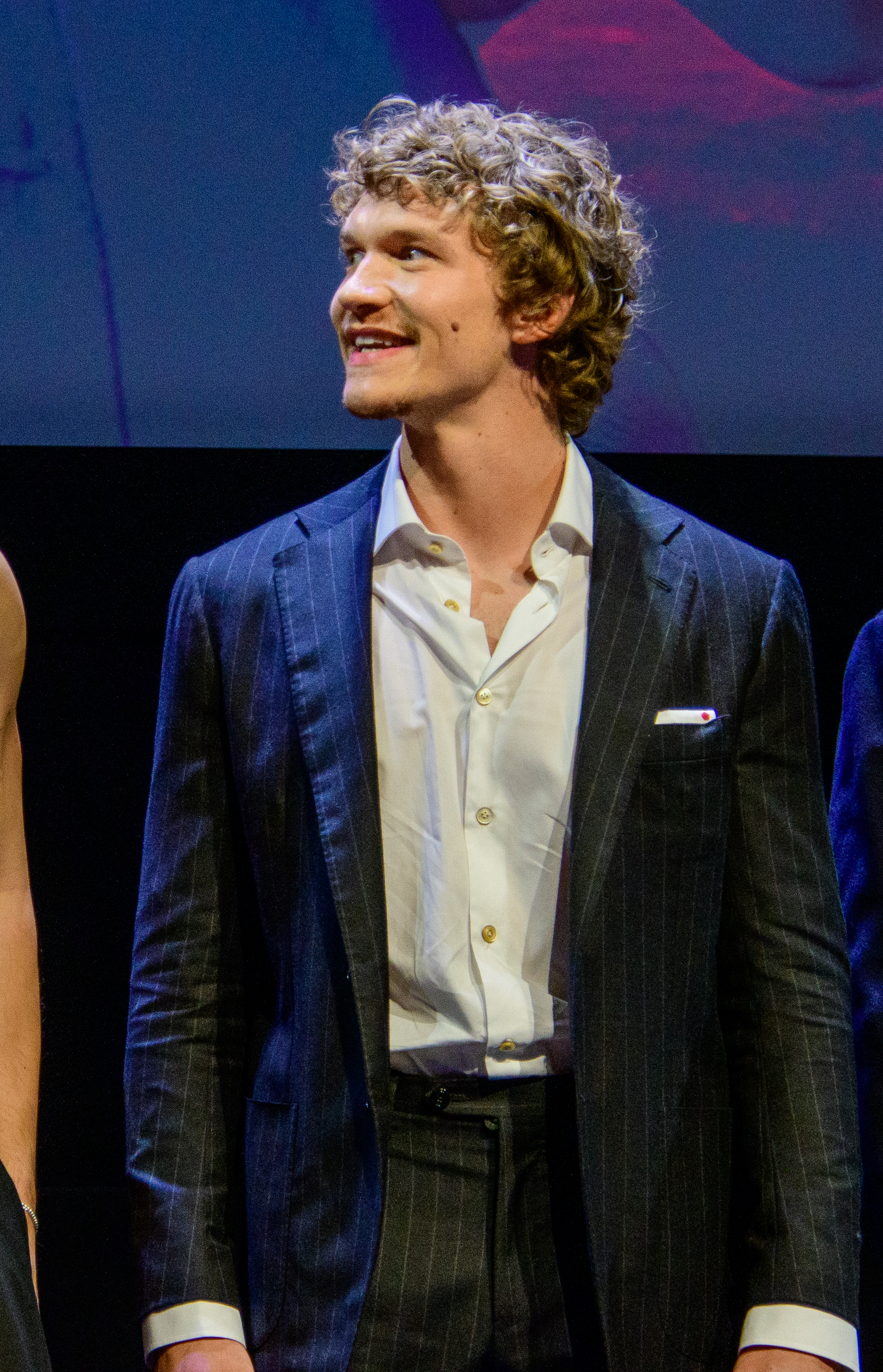
Actors Hudson Williams and Connor Storrie at the Toronto premiere of Heated Rivalry on November 24, 2025

=== Main ===
- François Arnaud as Scott Hunter, an American ice hockey player and captain of the New York Admirals
- Hudson Williams as Shane Hollander, a mixed Japanese-Canadian and White Canadian ice hockey player and captain of the Montreal Metros
- Connor Storrie as Ilya Rozanov, a Russian ice hockey player and captain of the Boston Raiders
- Christina Chang as Yuna Hollander, Shane's mother
- Ksenia Daniela Kharlamova as Svetlana Vetrova, Ilya's close friend and occasional sexual partner
- Callan Potter as Hayden Pike, Shane's teammate and best friend
- Franco Lo Presti as Cliff Marleau, Ilya's teammate in Boston
- Kamilla Kowal as Jackie Pike, Hayden's wife
- Yaroslav Poverlo as Polkovnik Grigori Rozanov, Ilya's father, a well connected Russian police officer
- Slavic Rogozine as Alexei Grigoryevich Rozanov, Ilya's brother who habitually asks for money
- Dylan Walsh as David Hollander, Shane's father
- Benjamin Roy as Jean-Jacques "JJ" Dagenais, Shane's teammate in Montreal
- Kolton Stewart as Carter Vaughn, Scott's teammate and best friend
- Robbie G.K. as Christopher "Kip" Grady, a smoothie shop barista
- Bianca Nugara as Maria Villanueva, Kip's co-worker at Straw+Berry and friend
- Brandon Ash-Mohammed as Shawn, Kip's friend
- Matthew Finlan as Kyle Swift, the bartender at The Kingfisher
- Nadine Bhabha as Elena Rygg, Kip's best friend
- Matt Gordon as George Grady, Kip's father
- Sophie Nélisse as Rose Landry, a famous actress whom Shane dates

==== Featured ====
- Trevor Hayes as Boston General Manager
- Kaden Connors as Sasha, Ilya's former sexual partner and the son of Ilya's former coach
- Harrison Browne as Connors, Ilya's teammate
- Devante Senior as Miles, Rose's friend and co-star

=== Recurring ===
- Arthur Moukhortov as Sorren Miitka, Shane's teammate and the Metros' goaltender
- Vitali Makarov as Sergei Vetrov, the Russian Minister of Interior, former Soviet goaltender and Svetlana's father

=== Guest ===
- Aidan Shaw as Kolya Andropov, Shane's teammate
- Wayne Ward as Tom
- Billie Mary Silas and Sam Nicole Silas as Ruby and Emma Pike, Hayden and Jackie's daughters
- Foster Blake as Maxime, the bartender at Le Tambour
- Tyrone Edwards as himself
- Lainey Lui as herself

== Episodes ==
No.	Title	Directed by	Written by	Original release date
1	"Rookies"	Jacob Tierney	Jacob Tierney	November 28, 2025
In December 2008, young hockey players Shane Hollander of Canada and Ilya Rozanov of Russia meet before the International Prospect Cup final, which Russia wins. Six months later, Ilya is picked first at the Major League Hockey (MLH) draft by the Boston Raiders, and Shane is picked second by the Montreal Metros. The two have a chance encounter at the hotel gym later that night. Canada beats Russia at the following year's Prospect Cup final. After filming a commercial together in summer 2010, Shane and Ilya become aroused while showering side-by-side, leading them to meet clandestinely at their hotel and have oral sex. The MLH stokes a perceived rivalry between them during their rookie season, including at an All-Star Game in February 2011. There, Ilya tells Shane his hotel room number, prompting another tryst. After exchanging numbers saved under aliases, plans to have sex in Montreal fall through when their game there is cancelled. Four months later, Shane wins Rookie of the Year at the MLH Awards. At the after-party, the pair argue on a balcony when Shane perceives Ilya as a sore loser. Ilya kisses Shane, but Shane fears they will be seen and hastily leaves.
2	"Olympians"	Jacob Tierney	Jacob Tierney	November 28, 2025
Shane and Ilya begin sexting over the course of two years, including before their game in fall 2013, after which they meet at Shane's apartment and have penetrative sex for the first time. During the 2014 Winter Olympics in Sochi, Ilya begins ignoring Shane's texts after his Russian hockey team performs poorly. Following a discussion with his friends Scott Hunter and Carter Vaughn, where the latter commends the bravery of presumably gay figure skaters performing in conservative Russia, Shane attempts to support Ilya in person, but is met with hostility. At a gala, Ilya's friend Svetlana saves him from speaking with both of their overbearing fathers. She leaves Ilya alone with his past sexual partner who is his coach's son, Sasha; Ilya rejects Sasha's proposition to hook up. As Ilya continues to ignore Shane, Ilya's team goes on to win the MLH championship. While backstage at the MLH awards in the summer of 2014, where the two co-present an award together, Shane expresses frustration with Ilya for being distant. In the bathroom after the awards, Ilya proposes a meeting that night, during which the two have sex again in Ilya's penthouse. Afterward, Ilya shuts down when Shane asks about his comfort in Russia, causing Shane to leave feeling dejected.
3	"Hunter"	Jacob Tierney	Jacob Tierney	December 5, 2025
Four months before the 2014 Winter Olympics, Scott steps into a smoothie shop and orders a smoothie recommended by an employee named Kip. That night, Scott finally breaks a scoring slump. Driven by superstition, Scott returns to the smoothie shop before each home game and orders the same thing while subtly flirting with Kip. While playing away, Scott loses games against the Raiders and the Metros. After the latter, Shane and Scott brawl when Scott implies that he knows about him and Ilya. At a fundraiser where Kip serves food, Scott asks Kip back to his house. They have sex, after which Scott asks Kip to move in with him. After two months together, Kip's friend Elena warns him that Scott being closeted is demoralizing Kip. Scott speaks about being orphaned at age 12 and finding family in hockey. After Scott declines to join a hangout at a gay bar for Kip's birthday, Kip leaves Scott's apartment and goes home to his father, where he breaks down crying. Scott watches from outside as Kip celebrates his birthday and admission to graduate school with his friends.
4	"Rose"	Jacob Tierney	Jacob Tierney	December 12, 2025
Ilya and Shane continue to hook up from 2014 to 2016. In 2015, the Metros win their first cup in sixteen years and defend their title in 2016. When Shane and Ilya are asked by their friends about the person they have been texting for years, both deny any serious relationship. In Boston, Shane meets Ilya at his house for sex. Ilya invites Shane to sleep over, makes Shane a tuna melt, and they talk about their lives, with Ilya asking Shane if he's interested in women. Ilya worries about his father's worsening health. Shane and Ilya share an intimate moment while frotting when they call out each other's first names; this unsettles Shane, who leaves abruptly. Soon after, Shane meets movie star Rose Landry and begins a public romance with her, sparking Ilya's jealousy. After sharing a rough game in Montreal, Shane and Ilya go to the same nightclub with their friends, and they feed each other's jealousy by dancing and making out with women. The episode ends with the pair imagining each other while Ilya masturbates and Shane has sex with Rose.
5	"I'll Believe in Anything"	Jacob Tierney	Jacob Tierney	December 19, 2025
At dinner with Rose, Shane confirms her suspicions and admits he is gay, but they agree to remain friends. At the 2017 All-Star Game, Ilya and Shane reconnect and play on the same team for the first time. When Shane suggests their relationship has deepened beyond casual sex, Ilya insists that Russia and his family would not accept them as a couple and breaks down in Shane's arms. Ilya later learns of his father's passing and returns to Moscow for the funeral, where he cuts off his brother following a confrontation at the reception. Distraught, Ilya calls Shane and follows Shane's suggestion to express his complicated emotions in Russian, which includes confessing his love for Shane. After Shane is injured at a Boston versus Montreal game, Ilya visits him in the hospital, where a delirious Shane asks Ilya to spend the summer at his cottage. While Shane recovers at his parents' cottage, he and Ilya watch on TV as Scott wins the MLH Cup with the New York Admirals. To their shock, Scott comes out by inviting Kip onto the ice and kissing him publicly. Inspired, Ilya calls Shane to accept the invitation to his cottage.
6	"The Cottage"	Jacob Tierney	Jacob Tierney	December 26, 2025
Kip and his friends watch on TV as Scott discusses his public coming out while accepting the MVP award. Shane drives Ilya to Shane's cottage, where both reveal neither has had sex with anyone else in the months since they were last together. Ilya shares the trauma of his mother's death by suicide. Ilya proposes marrying Svetlana for American citizenship, but Shane objects and instead suggests a different plan: they publicly turn their rivalry into friendship, start a suicide prevention charity, and have Ilya move closer by playing for Ottawa. The two finally confess their love. After Shane's father arrives unannounced and sees them together, Ilya accompanies Shane while he comes out to his parents and explains their relationship, leading to an apology from his mother and a discussion of future plans over dinner. After Ilya calls himself Shane's boyfriend for the first time, Shane and Ilya drive back to the cottage as a couple.

== Production ==
=== Development ===
Season 1

Heated Rivalry is based on Rachel Reid's Game Changers novel series (2018–2027). Reid drew inspiration from the real-life rivalry between Sidney Crosby and Alexander Ovechkin for the book. She also cited Jaromír Jágr, Teemu Selänne, and Ilya Kovalchuk as other inspirations for the character of Ilya Rozanov, as well as Wayne Gretzky and Paul Kariya for the character of Shane Hollander.

Jacob Tierney first reached out to Reid on August 7, 2023, a day after The Washington Post ran an article about hockey romance novels. He had listened to the Game Changers series on audio book and wanted to discuss the possibility of adapting them to a limited television series. Tierney initially had doubts about whether the story could be adapted while retaining the books' sexually explicit content. Though queer romances such as the young adult adaptation Heartstopper had risen in popularity, Tierney said "the thing that is so fundamentally different in Heated Rivalry is sex... Sex is character development; it's not just a random sex scene in every episode. [The lead characters] learn about each other, and they learn about themselves through this". When meeting with potential financiers for the show, Tierney and co-producer Brendan Brady said they were met with studio notes that wanted to "fundamentally change the story, or fundamentally change the tone".

In January 2025, it was first announced that Crave picked up the show off a spec script by Tierney. This was confirmed by Reid on her blog. In March 2025, a month before production began, UK-based distributor Sphere Abacus stepped in to finance alongside Crave and Bell Media, ensuring that Tierney's vision for the show remained intact. In June 2025, it was officially announced at the Bell Media Upfront that the series would be streamed on Crave. Tierney created, wrote, and directed the series. He also serves as an executive producer alongside Brendan Brady through their production banner Accent Aigu Entertainment. Lori Fischburg is a producer of the series, and Reid is a consulting producer.

In a podcast interview with Kara Swisher, Brady revealed the budget was set to just under 3 million CAD (2.2 million USD) per episode.

Season 2

Tierney's creative executive at Crave, Rachel Goldstein, discouraged him from adapting Heated Rivalry's epilogue into the series, as it could have been perceived as setting up a second season that had not been confirmed at the time. On December 12, 2025, it was announced that the series was renewed for a second season by Crave, with HBO Max returning as a key distribution partner. The renewal follows strong viewer interest and streaming performance during the first season's rollout. The agreement also includes expanded distribution deals, with rights for season two secured across multiple international markets via Warner Bros. Discovery's distribution arm and other partners. It is set to adapt The Long Game (2022), the sixth book of the Game Changers series, which serves as a sequel to Heated Rivalry. Tierney later told Variety that the second season would not premiere at the same time the following year, citing slower progress on the episode scripts. He also told The Hollywood Reporter that, although he would direct all episodes of the second season, it is a possibility that "other writers will come in to help [him] out". Tierney has also stated that he plans to write a scene depicting Shane coming out to his team, an event that occurred off-page in the novel Heated Rivalry.

Season 3 and film

In November 2026, Deadline Hollywood reported that a third season was filmed back-to-back with the second season, wrapping in late November or early December. Additionally, a standalone film described as a holiday-themed special focusing on Scott and Kip—potentially adapting Reid's short story Merry Christmas, Scott and Kip!—was scheduled to film in December 2026 ahead of a planned theatrical release in December 2027.

=== Casting ===
Season 1

Hudson Williams and Connor Storrie lead the cast as Shane Hollander and Ilya Rozanov, respectively. Alongside them François Arnaud, Robbie G.K., Christina Chang, Dylan Walsh, Sophie Nélisse and Ksenia Daniela Kharlamova were cast. Williams and Storrie signed on for three seasons. Both actors were working as restaurant waiters prior to being cast. Tierney said it was essential to him that he found two actors who had the "physicality of hockey players" who were also comfortable with nudity and intimacy. He also said he wanted to find them together since "the show lives and dies on their relationship". Tierney expressed that Williams and Storrie had chemistry that was obvious from the first read, even though it was over Zoom. Casting was conducted by casting directors Jenny Lewis and Sara Kay.

Storrie revealed he had auditioned for the role shirtless, even though that had not been required. Williams was the third actor he had a chemistry read with, while Williams read with one other possible actor. When Tierney asked Storrie about his impression, he suggested Williams. Similarly, Williams felt an "inexplicable X-factor" about Storrie, telling Tierney: "The other guy was good, but Connor [Storrie] felt like he was going to pin me down and fuck me". In a December 2025 interview with The Hollywood Reporter, Williams stated that he portrayed the character of Shane as autistic after receiving confirmation from Reid that the character was on the autism spectrum. Williams cited his own father, who is on the spectrum, as an inspiration.

Nadine Bhabha, who plays Elena, was the first person cast in the series. She is a friend of Tierney's, and was offered the role directly without an audition. Arnaud, another longtime friend of Tierney's, received a call from him personally, asking him if he had received the script yet and telling him: "I didn't write this for you, but I cannot hear anyone else's voice in my head when I read it". Arnaud was surprised, perceiving the script as soft pornography, but changed his mind after understanding how the sex scenes are used to drive the story forward. Christina Chang, who plays Yuna Hollander, initially shared Arnaud's sentiment. She remembered reading the scripts and thinking, "Is this soft core porn? What's happening? It's hot. What the heck is happening right now? This is amazing. It's like Fifty Shades of... Oh, my God!" Kharlamova, whose role as Svetlana was substantially redefined for the television adaptation, stated that she approached the character with the intention of challenging stereotypical portrayals of Russians in Western media, noting that Russia has "around 200 different ethnic groups" and is "such a big country with so many different cultural influences." She was "very happy to show a different side".

Season 2

On August 7, 2026, the casting of Charlie Gillespie and Justice Smith as Troy Barrett and Harris Drover, respectively, the protagonists of the fifth Game Changers novel Role Model, was announced. On August 13, 2026, Edvin Ryding was announced as Luca Haas, alongside Emily Hampshire as Vanessa, Robert Naylor as Wyatt Hayes, Sabrina Jalees as Farah Jalali, and Priyanka as Tarek. On August 25, 2026, Daniel Diemer and Shaheen Jafargholi were announced as Ryan Price and Fabian Salah, who are the protagonists of the third Game Changers novel Tough Guy, respectively. On September 3, 2026, Kevin Zegers, Paul Gross, and Milla Jovovich were announced as Coach Weibe, Commissioner Roger Crowell, and Dr. Galina Molchalina, respectively. On September 16, 2026, Brendan Morgan, David Tomlinson, Gerry Dee, Michelle Mylett, Lauren Chan, and Nick Stahl were announced as Zane Boodram, Cody Kent, Coach Cooper, Lisa, Gen, and Curtis Barrett, respectively.

=== Filming ===
Season 1

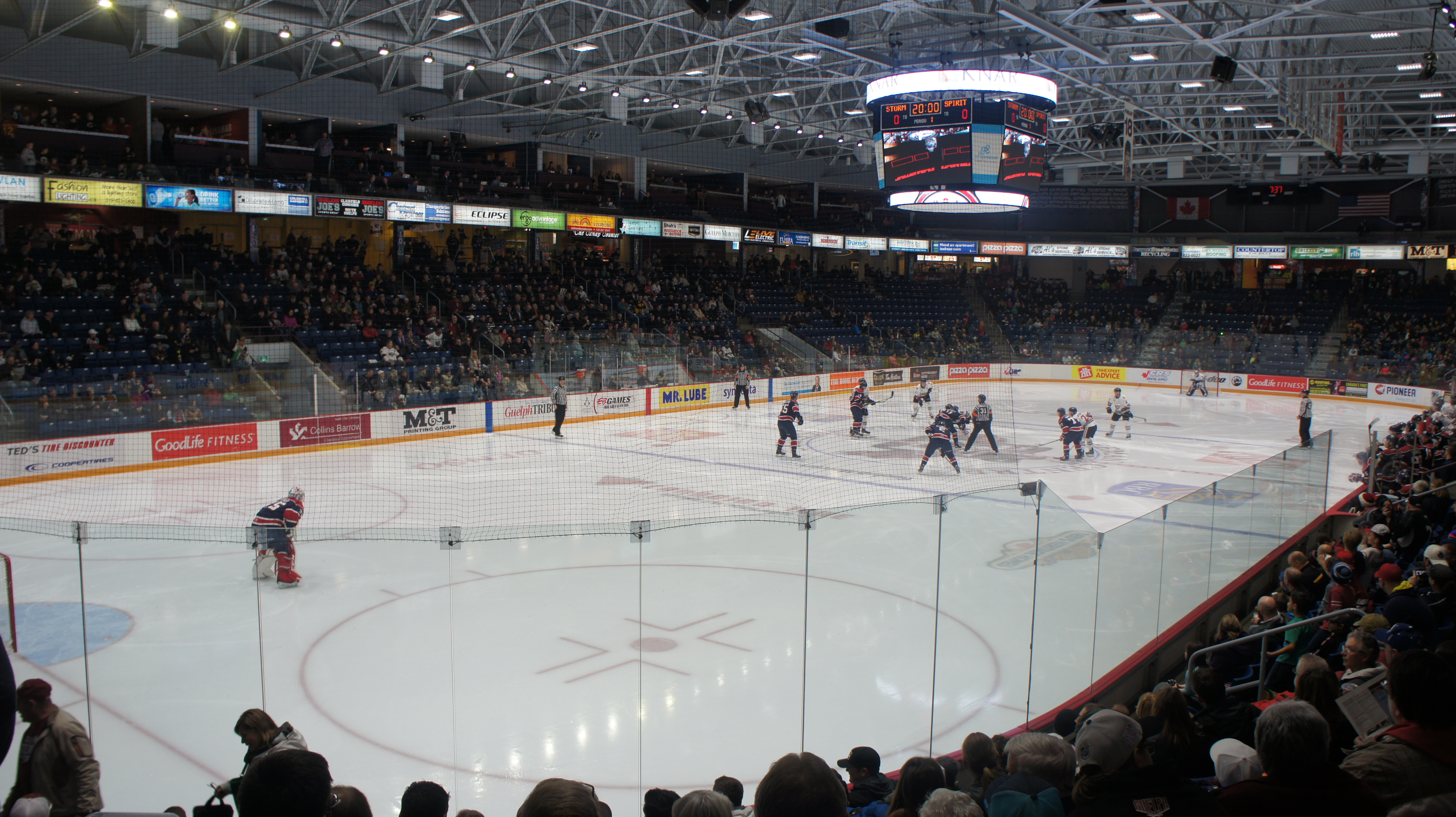
Interior of the Sleeman Centre, in which all hockey scenes were filmed

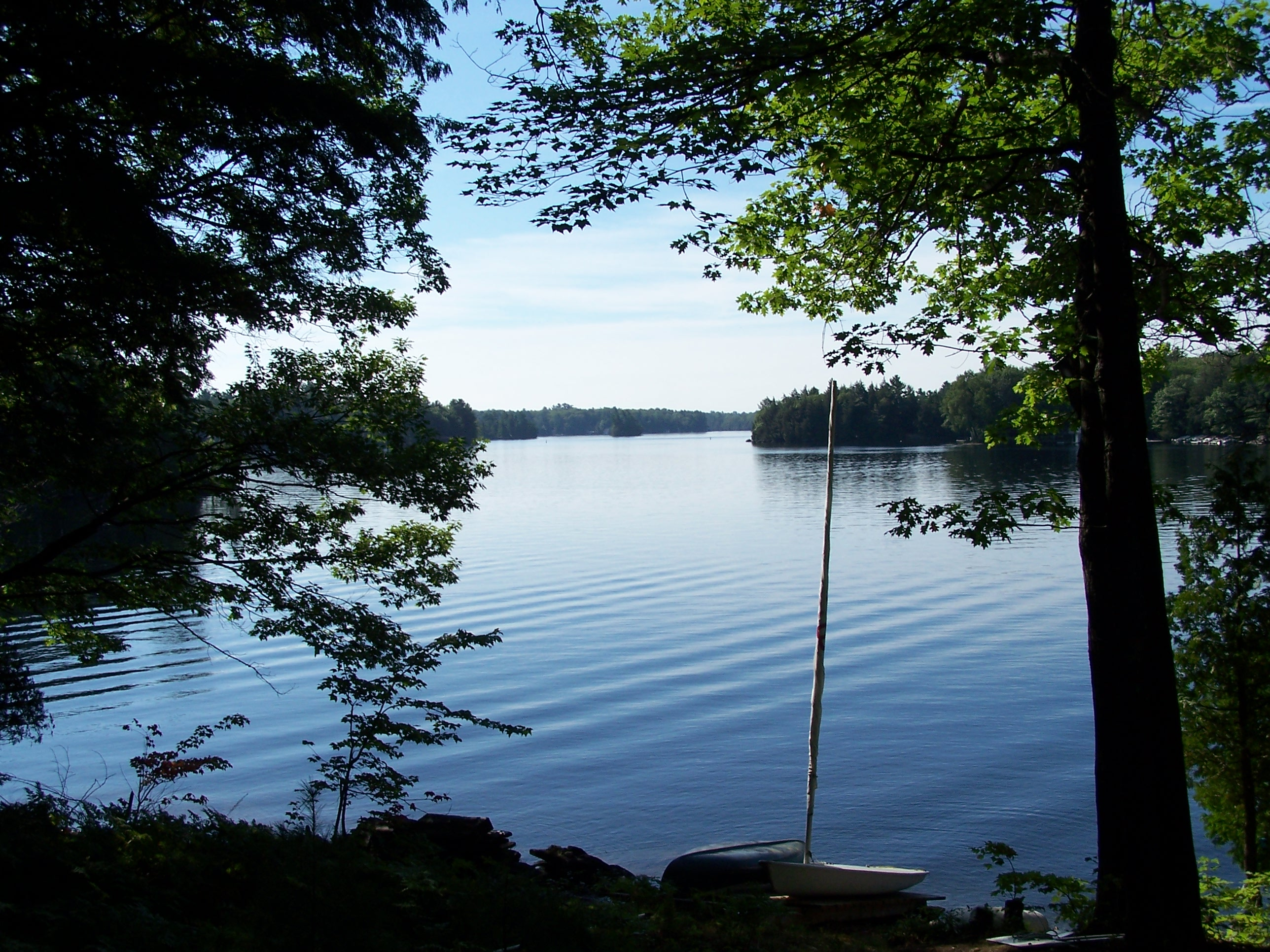
Lake Muskoka where the cottage in the final episode is located

Principal photography for the first season commenced in April 2025, with filming taking place across the Canadian provinces of Ontario and Quebec for 36 days. The first day of shooting included Shane and Ilya's Las Vegas hotel room encounter, while the hockey rink scenes were completed over a week of filming near the end of the shoot. In Ontario, locations included Toronto and Hamilton, with Dundurn Castle in Hamilton used as a stand-in for Moscow during a jogging scene involving Ilya in the episode "Olympians", and the outdoor of the McMaster Burridge Gym serving as the setting for Ilya and Shane's first meeting in the opening of the episode "Rookies". Additional filming in Hamilton took place at FirstOntario Concert Hall, which was used for the Los Angeles party sequence during the MLH draft.

All hockey sequences, including locker rooms, ice surface, and stands were filmed at the Sleeman Centre in Guelph. A cast of real-life hockey players were used to fill in the team, including body doubles for close-up shots of the lead actors in action on the ice. Williams was doubled by Jonah De Simone, while Storrie was doubled by Ralph Taggart.

The first-season finale was filmed in Muskoka. Several Montreal landmarks are featured in establishing shots, including Windsor Station, St. George's Anglican Church, Montreal Biosphere and Parc Jean-Drapeau. Additionally, the Montreal skyline is visible from Shane's high-rise apartment, and a framed picture of Saint Joseph's Oratory of Mount Royal can be seen on the bathroom wall of Ilya's Montreal hotel room in the episode "Rose". There are also a number of Montreal-specific references, including Mile End, McGill University and Rose Landry's St-Viateur Bagel shirt. According to Playback, studio production shooting occurred in Toronto at Dark Slope on a practical soundstage as well as on an LED volume soundstage using virtual production for specified shots.

Heated Rivalry was filmed out of order, which Tierney described as "one giant five-hour movie". The series' numerous sex scenes, which contributed to its critical attention, were overseen by intimacy coordinator Chala Hunter. The absence of frontal nudity was a decision made entirely by Tierney. While the scenes were heavily choreographed, Hunter allowed what she described as "artistic interpretation". The Las Vegas sex scene in the episode "Olympians" was filmed on the first day of production. Williams later stated that he chose not to use protective padding during its filming, resulting in stomach pain. The conversation between Shane and Ilya in a Tampa hotel in the episode "I'll Believe in Anything" was also filmed on the first day of production. The scene served as one of Williams and Storrie's audition scenes. The episode also features Storrie delivering a four-page monologue in Russian. After a particularly strong take, Tierney asked Storrie's dialect coach, Kate Yablunovsky, how much of it could be used, to which she replied, "All of it. He humbles me." The episode "The Cottage" was filmed during the final two days of production. A scene in which Ilya performs oral sex on Shane while the latter is on the phone with Hayden was partially improvized. Hunter noted that Storrie improvized a beat "so unexpected she had to step away from the monitors". The final scene filmed during production depicts Ilya telling Shane about his late mother while lying in Shane's lap.

According to cinematographer Jackson Parrell, the show was filmed with two ALEXA 35s cameras, using Panavision's T Series anamorphic lenses. He worked with a Toronto-based company, Dark Slope, to create the VFX wall used to create backgrounds, also known as LED volume walls, for a scene set in Russia, a Florida sunset, and the Las Vegas skyline.

Season 2–3

In February 2026, on CBS Mornings, Tierney revealed that the second season is expected to begin filming in August 2026. Filming for the second season began on August 17, with production sharing a first look at the set via an official social media post featuring a custom "HR" clapperboard. By November 2026, it was revealed that seasons two and three were being filmed back-to-back and expected to wrap in either late November or early December.

=== Music ===
The musical score for Heated Rivalry was composed by Peter Peter. He released the tracks "Rivalry" and "It's You" as a double single on January 9, 2026. The former serves as the series' theme song, while the latter accompanies the scene in the episode "Olympians" depicting Shane and Ilya's first instance of penetrative sex. The full soundtrack was released digitally on January 16, 2026, via Milan Records. CD and LP releases are set to be released later in 2026. On February 12, 2026, Milan Records released "MLH Anthem", the official theme of the league, composed by Anthony William Wallace.

Peter Peter was contacted by Tierney over Instagram in mid-2024 asking if he would be interested in screen composing for a television show. The musician became a participant in the process, reading early versions of scripts, and composing music inspired by them. He eventually disposed of those songs when he received footage from the episodes and re-wrote the music to the images over the span of about seven weeks.

In addition to its original score, the series has featured needle drop songs across its episodes, including Dilly Dally's "I Feel Free", Feist's "Sealion" and "My Moon My Man", Wet Leg's "Mangetout", Wolf Parade's "I'll Believe in Anything", Baxter Dury's "Lips", t.A.T.u.'s "All the Things She Said" and its cover by UK producer Harrison, Satine's "C'est toi", and Cailin Russo's "Bad Things". According to Billboard, the songs' appearance in the series resulted in increased official on-demand streaming activity. The Hollywood Reporter reported that the Spotify streams for the t.A.T.u. track more than doubled following the release of the fourth episode. Classical music also makes a number of appearances in the series, including Sergei Rachmaninoff's Piano Concerto No. 2 and Ludwig van Beethoven's Moonlight Sonata which feature during the episodes "Olympians" and "I'll Believe in Anything", respectively.

On the What Chaos! podcast, Tierney stated that he had intended to ask Carly Rae Jepsen to submit an original song for the first season, but "didn't even try" due to budgetary restrictions, adding that he would "definitely be asking" in the future. Miley Cyrus also expressed interest in contributing music for the second season.

== Release ==
On November 19, 2025, nine days before the series premiere on Crave, it was announced that HBO Max had acquired US and Australian rights to the show for a day-and-date global release. HBO Max's acquisition of the series, which was spearheaded by the company's content chairman and CEO Casey Bloys and the SVP content planning and programming Jason Butler, was attributed in part to online social media buzz generated by the Game Changers fanbase who campaigned for global distribution. In December 2025, following its renewal for a second season, HBO Max bought further rights to the series for Latin America, Singapore, Hong Kong, Taiwan, Thailand, the Philippines, Macau, Sri Lanka, Nepal, and Europe excluding the UK, Ireland, Spain and Turkey.

Heated Rivalry was originally scheduled for release in February 2026, around the 2026 Winter Olympics. However, in late September, Tierney and the executives decided to push the release forward to take advantage of increased audience interest in new series during the holiday season. The first season debuted on Crave with a two-episode premiere on November 28, 2025, followed by weekly episodes, with the finale aired on December 26. In advance of the program's television premiere, the first episode received a preview screening in Montreal at the 2025 Image+Nation festival on November 23, 2025. The series is also streaming on Sky-owned Neon in New Zealand and Movistar Plus+ in Spain. On December 19, it began streaming on HBO Max in the Philippines. On January 10, 2026, it premiered on Sky in the United Kingdom and Ireland. In India, the series began streaming on Lionsgate Play from February 20, 2026.

In partnership with Sphere Abacus and Crave, Regal Cinemas and other participating theater chains including AMC Theatres and Cinemark launched a limited theatrical run of the first season across more than 650 locations in North America, the United Kingdom, Australia, and New Zealand. Running from November 6 to 30, 2026, the six-episode screenings featured exclusive cast introductions and themed concessions.

The second season is expected to premiere in Spring 2027.

=== Marketing ===
The trailer for Heated Rivalry was released on October 9, 2025. The promotional posters for the series were photographed by Caitlin Cronenberg. On December 10, François Arnaud promoted the production between the Montreal Canadiens and the Tampa Bay Lightning. During the event, which coincided with the league's Pride Night, the series' trailer was screened for the audience.

In January 2026, HBO Max and the 2026 Winter Olympics organizing committee announced that Connor Storrie and Hudson Williams would be torchbearers for the games' torch relay; the two actors took part on January 25 in Feltre, Italy. HBO Max was scheduled to begin streaming both Heated Rivalry and the 2026 Olympics to Italian viewers in February.

=== Home media ===
The first season was released on DVD and Blu-ray by Alliance Home Entertainment on October 20, 2026. A "Collector’s Edition" 4K UHD and Blu-ray combo pack is expected for release on November 24, 2026.

== Reception ==
=== Critical response ===
Professional ratings
Aggregate scores
Source	Rating
Metacritic	67/100
Rotten Tomatoes	97%
Review scores
Source	Rating
Collider	8/10
The Standard	5/5 stars
The Asian Cut	5/5 stars
The Age	4/5 stars
Common Sense Media	4/5 stars
Metro	3/5 stars
Financial Times	3/5 stars
The Daily Telegraph	3/5 stars
The Guardian	3/5 stars

On the review aggregator website Rotten Tomatoes, 97% of 95 critics' reviews are positive, with an average rating of 7.95/10. The website's consensus reads: "Jacob Tierney lovingly adapts Rachel Reid's hockey-set romance novels into an all-consuming, steamy, dreamy love fest of true queer intent, making Heated Rivalry a bona fide winner." Metacritic, which uses a weighted average, assigned the season a score of 67 out of 100, based on seven critics, indicating "generally favorable" reviews.

Critics praised Williams and Storrie's performances and chemistry. In The Washington Post, Rachel Kurzius wrote: "Their faces capture a complex cocktail of feelings, their chemistry is bonkers and Storrie [...] pulls off an impressive Russian accent". For their performances in the first-season finale, TVLine named both Williams and Storrie as "Performers of the Week", while /Film described them as the strongest break-out performances of the year. Williams also received acclaim for his portrayal of an autistic character, with Time praising the performance for its nuanced, non-stereotypical depiction grounded in an authentic understanding of autism. Time's review was endorsed by the Autism Research Institute. Arnaud's portrayal of Scott received widespread critical acclaim. Dominic Baez of The Seattle Times compared the "Hunter" episode to the acclaimed "Long, Long Time" episode from The Last of Us, calling it "a genius, moving inclusion" that was "anchored by François Arnaud's devastating performance". Daniel Feinberg of The Hollywood Reporter expressed disappointment that Arnaud and Storrie were ineligible for Emmy consideration due to submission rules, highlighting Scott's championship moment and Ilya's Russian monologue among the series' standout scenes.

David Caballero of Collider gave the series an 8 out of 10, noting the effective early development of their characters both individually and as a potential couple, and the prominent yet accessible use of hockey in the story. Kaiya Shunyata of RogerEbert.com described the series as "revolutionary" and called it "one of the most entertaining shows of the year" as well as "the most significant queer show of the year". In The Globe and Mail, J. Kelly Nestruck lauded Tierney's writing and direction, saying he "teases out the nuances of homophobia in hockey in the time period depicted – the first two episodes careen from 2008 to 2014 – and the cultural challenges of being queer and closeted in Canada versus Russia without ever skating too close to the zone of social-issue drama". Writing for Vanity Fair, Mikhail Zygar stated that Ilya Rozanov's story likely resonated with the Russian queer community.

Lucy Mangan of The Guardian was more critical and gave the show three stars out of five, saying that it focuses too much on explicit, idealized depictions of gay sex at the expense of other aspects of the narrative, such as character development. The series has also sparked debate and discussion about the presence and visibility of LGBT people in sports, and about media portrayal of gay and bisexual men and its relationship with boys' love media and its predominantly female fandom.

Within just a few weeks, commentators began remarking on the show's impact as both a queer story and a romance novel adaption. After only two episodes had aired, Harper's Bazaar listed it among the best queer television series of all time. /Film noted in an article in January 2026 that the series "builds on the legacy of influential queer TV shows such as Queer as Folk and The L Word, along with more recent series like Looking." By the end of the year, the series ranked among the best TV shows of 2025 on the lists by Cosmopolitan, the New York Post, Refinery29, The Seattle Times, and the Toronto Star. In April 2026, British Vogue included it among the 29th best TV shows of the century. Media outlets also noted the show's crossover appeal among hockey fans. Vogue Adria and InsideHook highlighted the Empty Netters podcast, hosted by former ice hockey players, for its enthusiastic coverage of the series which they cited as an example of "non-toxic masculinity" within the sport.

In particular, the fifth episode received widespread critical acclaim. Tom Smyth of Vulture and Mads Misasi of Tell-Tale TV both gave the episode perfect five star ratings, while Cody Schultz of Show Snob described it as "a masterclass in storytelling" and one of the greatest television episodes of the year and of all time. Whitney Evans of TV Fanatic praised the episode's structure and pacing, as well as Storrie's performance, highlighting his Russian accent work and screen presence. Writing for Fangirlish, Lissete Lanuza Sáenz named it the best episode of the year, commending the performances of Williams and Storrie alongside the direction, cinematography, lighting, and writing, while fellow writer Lyra Hale highlighted the episode's portrayal of intimacy as a model for romantic storytelling on television. BJ Colangelo of /Film also praised the performances, specifically Williams, Storrie, and Sophie Nélisse, and remarked that the series and Storrie are deserving of Emmy recognitions.

=== Audience response ===
In addition to its critical reception, the fifth episode achieved notable audience recognition. Shortly after its release, it entered IMDb's rankings of highest-rated television episodes, attaining a rare perfect 10 out of 10 rating. For a time, starting on December 20, 2025, it tied with Breaking Bad's "Ozymandias" (2013) as the only television episodes to receive a perfect rating on the platform, and ranked among the highest-rated episodes of all time. Following the episode's reception, the series itself also entered IMDb Top 250 TV shows chart.

Despite not being available to legally stream in Russia due to anti-LGBTQ laws, the series achieved an 8.3 user rating on Kinopoisk, making it one of the highest rated shows in the country. The series was considered a pirated hit in China due to not being officially released, and was one of the highest-rated shows on Douban with an 8.8 user rating.

=== Viewership ===
According to JustWatch, Heated Rivalry ranked fourth on its television streaming chart during the week of December 7, 2025, while Whip Media, based on data from its TV Time viewership tracking platform of more than 25 million users, reported the series placed sixth during the weeks of December 7 and 14. According to FlixPatrol, which compiles proprietary streaming viewership data, the series ranked second on HBO Max's Top 10 most-watched series chart in the United States on November 29 behind It: Welcome to Derry. The series also debuted at number two in Australia, and consistently ranks as the number one show each week. Conversely, the show ranked below the top ten in Nielsen streaming ratings. Because Nielsen classified Heated Rivalry as having been "acquired", as HBO Max obtained it from Crave, it was being compared to long-running comfort shows like Grey's Anatomy or NCIS.

Alongside the announcement of its second season renewal, Deadline Hollywood reported that the series had become Crave's most-watched original series to date, with viewership increasing by nearly 400% in its initial seven-day streaming window following its debut on November 28. According to data shared by Crave's social media accounts, the show exhibited unusually high "stickiness", with a rewatch rate where approximately one-third (33%) of the total audience watched the entire season more than once. Furthermore, 15% of viewers were reported to have completed the series five or more times and episode five was the most rewatched among the six episodes.

HBO Max also revealed the show is the No. 2 driver of first-time viewers on the platform since its release. The series became a significant word-of-mouth success, characterized by an "unusual" growth pattern in its viewership. Despite a minimal marketing campaign and a low-cost licensing fee of approximately $600,000 per episode, it experienced a rapid surge in popularity following its late-November premiere. According to data from the research group Luminate, the show debuted with 30 million streaming minutes in its first week, failing to break into the top 50 streaming programs. However, by the release of the season finale on December 26, weekly viewership had increased more than tenfold to 324 million minutes. Additionally, after the show was fully released, its viewership hardly slowed down. During the week of January 2, 2026, the show was viewed for over 254 million minutes. By January 21, 2026, episodes were averaging 8 million viewers; just over a week later, that increased again to 9 million. By February, the series was averaging 10.6 million viewers, and had more than doubled its viewership since the finale in December.. Nearly a year after its premiere, the show had averaged 12 million viewers on HBO Max and 3.5 million viewers on Crave.

=== Accolades ===
Heated Rivalry faced unique eligibility constraints for major television awards, rendering it ineligible for the Primetime Emmy Awards because it was not initially developed as a US co-production—though it later received the Television Academy Honors Award for advancing positive social change. In Canada, lead actor Connor Storrie was ineligible for the Canadian Screen Awards due to citizenship restrictions. Furthermore, because the series premiered after the cutoff date for the 14th Canadian Screen Awards, it was originally slated for 2027 eligibility; however, following a successful appeals process, the series was permitted to compete early and went on to dominate the 14th ceremony, winning every category for which it was nominated, including Best Drama Series and Best Lead Performance in a Drama Series for Williams.

== Cultural impact ==
=== The "Heated Rivalry Effect" ===
==== Real life ====
Following the 2025 premiere of the television adaptation, lead actor Hudson Williams noted that the series had resonated with closeted professional athletes. During an interview on Radio Andy, Williams stated that he and author Rachel Reid had received private correspondence from active players in the NHL, NFL, and NBA who shared their experiences of concealing their sexual orientation. Williams described these interactions as evidence that while the show is "celebratory", its depiction of the challenges faced by LGBTQ athletes "hits people right in the nerves". The NHL also acknowledged the show's impact, with a representative describing the series as a "unique driver" for attracting new fans to the sport.

The series has also been cited in individual coming-out stories. Jesse Kortuem, a former hockey player who played in competitive leagues in Minnesota, publicly came out as gay, stating that Heated Rivalry inspired him to share his experience after previously leaving the sport due to fears of reconciling his sexuality with his athletic career. Argentine field hockey player Nicolás Keenan compared the episode "Hunter" to his own experience prior to publicly confirming his relationship with Dutch politician Rob Jetten.

=== Representation ===
The production has also been noted for its casting of queer performers. François Arnaud, who portrays Scott Hunter, is openly bisexual, and transgender actor and former professional hockey player Harrison Browne appears in a supporting role. The narrative of Heated Rivalry mirrors statistical data regarding LGBTQ athletes. A 2025 study of over 1,700 athletes found that approximately 39.4 per cent of female athletes and 36.5 per cent of male athletes conceal their sexual orientation in sports settings due to team culture and hypermasculine norms. These findings reflect the character arcs of Shane and Ilya, who both navigate concealment to protect their careers. Similarly, research into collegiate athletics suggests that while non-LGBTQ athletes report low concern about queer teammates, LGBTQ athletes report higher frequencies of homophobic language in locker rooms.

Despite the show's LGBTQ representation and potential for impact, some scholars, journalists, and former athletes note ongoing limitations to the show's cultural reach. University of Guelph gender and sexuality studies professor Adam Davies argued that while the series increases queer visibility, structural inequalities and cultural norms within hockey—including the historical marginalization of Black Canadians and ongoing abuse scandals—remain significant barriers to systemic change. Brock McGillis, the first openly gay professional men's hockey player, expressed scepticism that the series would encourage players to come out. Though McGillis voiced his appreciation of the show, he suggested that portrayals of secret relationships might inadvertently reinforce fears regarding the consequences of being openly gay in professional hockey.

=== In popular culture ===
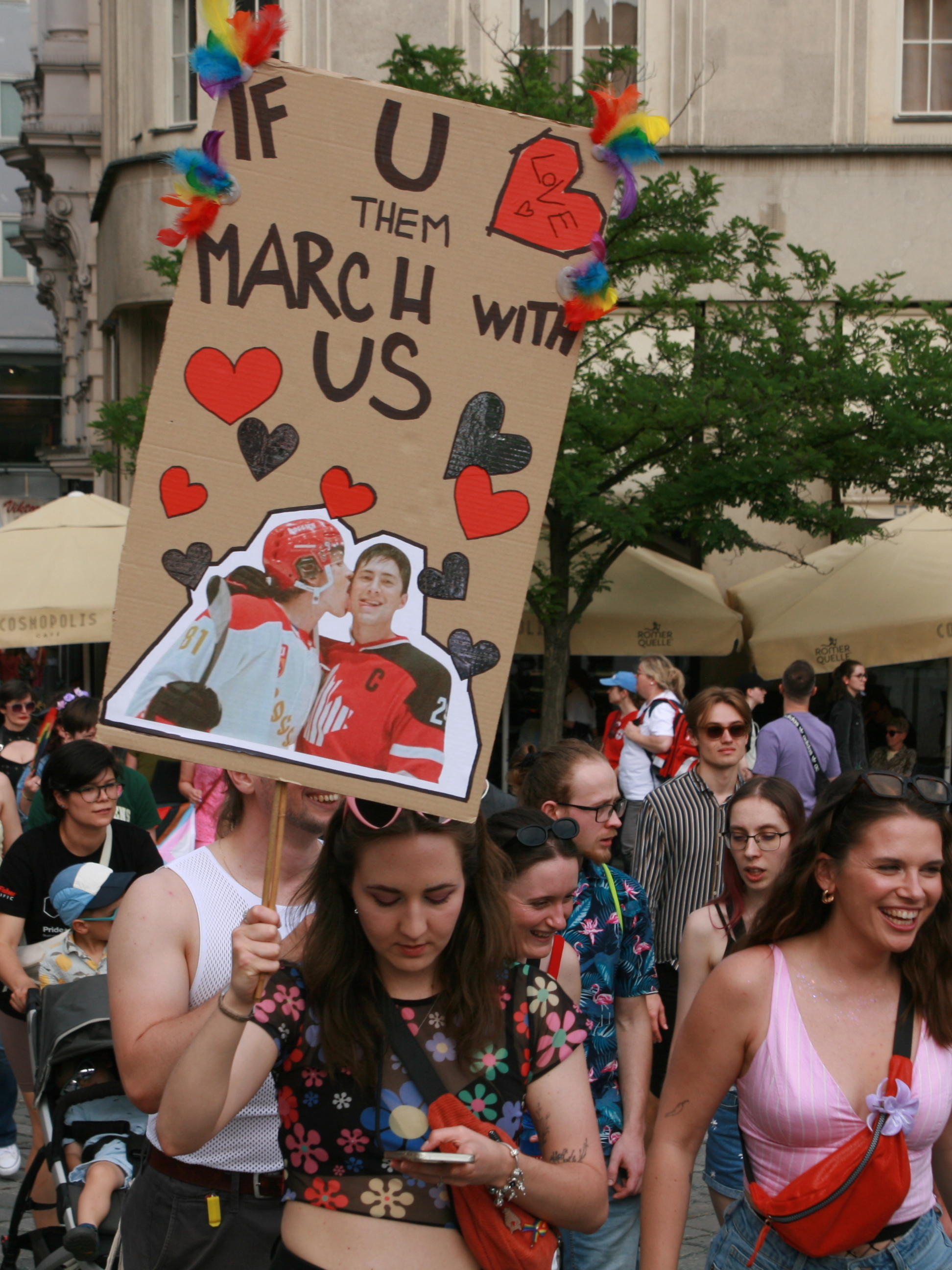
Young person carrying a placard during Brno Pride Parade that features the two main characters Ilya and Shane (June 2026)

The January 17, 2026 episode of Saturday Night Live featured a sketch titled "Heated Wizardry", parodying Heated Rivalry and the Harry Potter film series. The sketch starred host Finn Wolfhard as a character combining Shane Hollander and Harry Potter, opposite Ben Marshall as a character combining Ilya Rozanov and Ron Weasley, within a storyline that merged elements from both series. The show has also been lampooned by three American musical theatre productions: Heated Rivalry: The Musical Parody! (Note: Also known as Heated Rivalry: The Deeply Unauthorized Musical Parody, Heated Rivalry: The Musical Parody.) by Quick & Funny Musicals, (Note: An Upright Citizens Brigade-affiliated sketch comedy troupe.) which premiered on March 5, 2026, at the UCB Theatre in Los Angeles, California; Puck Bunnies: A Heated Rivalry Drag Musical Parody by Kyra Brown and Christan Leonard, which premiered on April 17 at The Elysian Theater in Los Angeles; and Heated Rivalry: The Unauthorized Musical Parody by Dylan MarcAurele and Alan Kliffer, which premiered on May 26 at the off-Broadway venue The Culture Club (Note: Also known as The Club, The Club at Culture Club, Sixth Floor Theater; at 530 W 27th Street.) in Chelsea, Manhattan. (Note: Attributed to multiple sources:) In early August, all three opened at the Edinburgh Festival Fringe. (Note: Attributed to multiple sources:) The off-Broadway parody also had limited runs in Toronto and Montreal (Note: For Just for Laughs.) in July, and is slated to release an original cast album and to open in London, England later in 2026.

Mayor of Ottawa Mark Sutcliffe proclaimed January 29, 2026, Shane Hollander Day. In April 2026, Pacific Marine Mammal Center named a rescued sea lion Hollander after the character. For The Guardian, Sue Carter wrote that the character of Shane Hollander has been embraced as part of Heated Rivalry's distinctly Canadian identity, with tourism campaigns and promotional material referencing him as a cultural figure, such as Ottawa Tourism changing its social media bio to the "birthplace of Shane Hollander". Since the premiere in November 2025, the character of Ilya Rozanov has been described as a queer icon in Russia. Writing for The Advocate, Michael Dru Kelley argued that the character of Ilya serves as a cultural breakthrough, particularly for closeted or uncertain bisexual men, by depicting a hyper-masculine elite athlete whose storyline may encourage them to explore and embrace their identity.

On September 29, 2026, the Irina Foundation announced on their social media platforms that they were launching. The foundation, co-founded by Jacob Tierney and Brendan Brady, is named after the foundation that characters Shane Hollander and Ilya Rozanov created in memory of Ilya's mother, Irina. The foundation describes its mission as "championing inclusivity and mental well-being and resilience by supporting programs that connect people through organized sports and the arts programs, with a focus on LGBTQIA2S+ and underserved communities".

== See also ==
- Ice hockey in popular culture – Cultural depictions of the sport of ice hockey
- Yuri on Ice – 2016 sports anime television series
- LGBTQ people in ice hockey
