= Heated Rivalry: The Unauthorized Musical Parody (musical) =

2026 musical parody in New York City

- Music: Dylan MarcAurele
- Lyrics: Dylan MarcAurele
- Book: Dylan MarcAurele
- Basis: Heated Rivalry
- Premiere: 2006: Culture Club, New York City

Heated Rivalry: The Unauthorized Musical Parody is a musical comedy parody of Season 1 of the Canadian sports romance television series Heated Rivalry. The show started as a one-night reading and opened as a limited off-Broadway production on the sixth floor of the Culture Club in New York City in 2026. The score and book are by composer and playwright Dylan MarcAurele, who also composed Pop Off, Michaelangelo! The New York City run has been extended and additional productions have been staged in 2026 at the Edinburgh Fringe and in London. The show follows the plot of Season 1 and affectionately parodies both the show and its fans by retelling the primary plotlines of Season 1 through the eyes of "a loveable wine mom." The show started with six staged readings in March 2026, and was originally scheduled as an eight week run, with previews starting May 12, 2026, and official opening May 26, 2026. The staging is described as simple with a cast of seven, who recorded an original cast album released in September 2026.
