= I'll Believe in Anything (song) =

Song by Wolf Parade

from the album Apologies to the Queen Mary
- Released: September 27, 2005
- Genre: Indie rock; baroque rock
- Length: 4:36
- Label: Sub Pop
- Songwriter: Spencer Krug
- Producer: Isaac Brock

Music video
- "I'll Believe in Anything" on YouTube

"I'll Believe in Anything" is a song by the Canadian indie rock band Wolf Parade. Written by band member Spencer Krug, it appears on their 2005 debut album, Apologies to the Queen Mary. The song was originally released on the debut album of Krug's solo project, Sunset Rubdown.

In late 2025, the song received renewed attention after it was used in the television series Heated Rivalry. Upon its renewed popularity, it charted at number 7 on the US Rock Digital Song Sales chart and peaked at number 4 on the US Alternative Digital Song Sales chart. Despite appearing on the show, it did not make the show's soundtrack.

== Background and composition ==
Spencer Krug wrote the song, which was first released in July 2005 on Snake's Got a Leg, the debut album of his side project, Sunset Rubdown. A writer for the Seattle Weekly described this version as a "lo-fi effort" derived from four-track experiments Krug recorded in his room. The song was re-recorded for Wolf Parade's Apologies to the Queen Mary, released later in 2005. The album features songs written by Krug interspersed with those by bandmate Dan Boeckner. In 2025, Krug posted a history of the song on Patreon and shared footage of its creation on Instagram.

The Wolf Parade version of the song begins with "octave-jumping keyboards," a feature also present in the Sunset Rubdown recording. The arrangement expands to include drums and distorted notes. The Seattle Weekly described the "offbeat, dueling keyboards" as making the song sound like it was "at war with itself." The Dallas Observer characterized Krug's vocals on the track as a cross between David Bowie and Isaac Brock. The lyrics include the line, "Give me your eyes / I need sunshine." The Music wrote that the song addresses themes of "ennui" and being "impressionable." The same publication noted that despite the song's "sullen" tone, it can make listeners feel empowered.

=== Music video ===
The music video depicts the band dressed in 18th-century attire, including powdered wigs, corsets, and white makeup. The Music compared the aesthetic to a "historically inaccurate Jane Austen novel." The video shows the band members dueling, ending with a chicken being shot by a cannon.

== Release and reception ==
The song is a regular part of Wolf Parade's live setlists. By January 2026, Parade reported it was the band's most popular track, with over 24 million streams on Spotify. Online music magazine Pitchfork ranked the song 95th on its list of the 200 best songs of the 2000s.

Arcade Fire covered the song on August 30, 2014, during the final performance of their Reflektor tour in Montreal. In January 2026, Spencer Krug performed a solo piano version at the Unreal City Fest in Vancouver.

== Modern usage ==
In December 2025, the song was used in "Hunter" and "I'll Believe in Anything," the third and fifth episodes, respectively, of the television series Heated Rivalry. The track plays during a scene where the character Scott Hunter comes out as gay. Following the episode's release, Billboard Canada reported that global streams of the song increased by more than 2,650 percent. Wolf Parade subsequently issued a reissue of the single and a hockey-themed T-shirt.

Krug told The Globe and Mail that he agreed to license the song because he knew the show's director, Jacob Tierney, and found the show's premise fun. He expressed surprise that the song had found a new audience 20 years after its release.

On October 25, 2026, Wolf Parade performed a shortened rendition of the song during the first intermission of the 2026 NHL Heritage Classic in Winnipeg. The band members performed wearing Montreal Canadiens jerseys. Montreal defeated the Winnipeg Jets 2–1.

== Charts ==
Chart performance
Chart (2026)	Peak position
Canada Digital Song Sales (Billboard)	20
US Alternative Digital Song Sales (Billboard)	4
US Rock Digital Song Sales (Billboard)	7

== Certifications ==
List of certifications
Region	Certification	Certified units/sales
United States (RIAA)	Gold	500,000^{‡}
^{‡} Sales+streaming figures based on certification alone.
