= Pop Off, Michelangelo! =

Pop Off, Michaelangelo!
- Music: Dylan MarcAurele
- Book: Dylan MarcAurele
- Setting: Renaissance Italy (modernised)
- Premiere: 31 July 2024: Gilded Balloon Patter House, Edinburgh Fringe Festival
- Productions: 2024 Edinburgh; 2024 London; 2025 London

Pop Off, Michelangelo! is an electropop comedy musical written by Dylan MarcAurele. Directed by Joe McNeice, the musical premiered at the 2024 Edinburgh Fringe Festival.

== Production history ==
Dylan MarcAurele first became inspired to write the musical on his honeymoon in Florence, when he was told Michelangelo and Leonardo da Vinci "were both gay artists, bitter rivals, but completely different in their lifestyles and philosophies". Due to how developed with director Joe McNeice, the show fuses "British camp" and "American chick flick" sensibilities from McNeice and MarcAurele respectively. Pop Off, Michelangelo! had its world premiere at the Edinburgh Fringe Festival on 31 July 2024. Directed by Joe McNeice, it was performed at the Gilded Balloon Patter House until 26 August, with Max Eade originating the titular role (Mike) opposite Aidan MacColl as Leonardo (Leo). Also in the cast were Sylvie Stenson, Joe Winter and Paul Toulson.

On 4 and 4 November 2024, Pop Off, Michelangelo! had a two-night London premiere at The Other Palace. Eade, MacColl and Toulson reprised their roles, while Lucy Carter and Maiya Quansah-Breed joined as Savonarola and Mother respectively. Assistant choreographer and Edinburgh understudy Conn McGirr also played Salai, taking over from Joe Winter.

Pop Off Michelangelo! returned to London for a spring 2025 limited run at the Underbelly Boulevard Soho, produced by Blair Russell Productions. In addition to Eade and MacColl, the cast included Laura Sillett, Kurran Dhand, Michael Marouli and Aoife Haakenson. A new mystery character portrayed by Sev Keoshgerian was added, revealed to be Niccolò Machiavelli. Previews began on 17 May, the show opened on 23 May with performances until 22 June.

== Cast and characters ==
Character	Edinburgh Fringe Festival	The Other Palace	Underbelly Boulevard Soho
Character	2024		2025
Michelangelo	Max Eade	Max Eade	Max Eade
Leonardo da Vinci	Aidan MacColl	Aidan MacColl	Aidan MacColl
Savonarola	Sylvie Stenson	Lucy Carter	Laura Sillett
Salai	Joe Winter	Conn McGirr	Kurran Dhand
Pope	Paul Toulson	Paul Toulson	Michael Marouli
Mother	—N/a	Maiya Quansah-Breed	Aoife Haakenson
Niccolò Machiavelli	—N/a	—N/a	Sev Keoshgerian
