= Heated Rivalry (novel) =

2019 novel by Rachel Reid

- First edition cover
- Author: Rachel Reid
- Language: English
- Series: Game Changers
- Genre: Gay sports romance
- Set in: 2008–2018 Canada, Russia and the U.S.
- Publisher: Carina Press
- Publication date: March 25, 2019
- Publication place: Canada
- Media type: Print (softcover); eBook; Audiobook
- Pages: 371
- ISBN: 9781488051241
- Preceded by: Game Changer
- Followed by: Tough Guy

Heated Rivalry is a 2019 gay sports romance novel by Canadian author Rachel Reid. It follows a secret romantic relationship between rival hockey stars Shane Hollander and Ilya Rozanov. The novel is the second in Reid's Game Changers series of gay-themed ice hockey romance novels. A television series based on the novel was released in November 2025.

== Development and release ==
Rachel Reid's Game Changer was published by Carina Press, an LGBTQ+ imprint of Harlequin, in 2018. It was followed by Heated Rivalry (2019), Tough Guy (2020), Common Goal (2020), Role Model (2021), The Long Game (2022), and the forthcoming Unrivaled (2027). Reid, a hockey fan, said in 2023, "Game Changer came from a place of me being angry at hockey culture and how clearly homophobic it was and is, and all the other things that made me really ashamed to be a hockey fan. That whole series attacks the NHL and hockey culture quite a bit." Writing the series, Reid questioned what would it mean to be a closeted player in a league with such a homophobic culture. "I thought a lot about what it would feel like to come out. And then I started thinking about the ripple effect—what would happen to the other players?"

Reid drew inspiration from the real-life rivalry between Sidney Crosby and Alexander Ovechkin for the book. In the novel's afterword, she credited HBO's reality television series 24/7, which had followed the 2011 NHL Winter Classic between Ovechkin's Washington Capitals and Crosby's Pittsburgh Penguins. She further cited Jaromír Jágr, Teemu Selänne, and Ilya Kovalchuk as inspirations for the character of Ilya Rozanov, and Wayne Gretzky and Paul Kariya for the character of Shane Hollander. Additionally, she credited Mikhail Sergachev as the biggest influence on Ilya's speech patterns. However, she noted: "I never directly base my characters on any real people ... I was also inspired by other sports rivalries, by other fictional stories, and by my love of the enemies-to-lovers and forbidden romance tropes."

== Plot summary ==
Star hockey players drafted in the same year, Shane Hollander and Ilya Rozanov play for rival hockey teams, the Montreal Voyageurs and the Boston Bears, and are often compared to one another. Canadian Shane is serious and introverted, and is known for his focus and discipline. Russian Ilya is a cocky party boy famed for both his talent and charisma. Shane has a close and supportive relationship with his parents, but Ilya's mother passed away when he was young, and he has a tense relationship with his family in Russia.

Shane and Ilya first meet as junior players, leading the teams of their respective nations. During the NHL draft, they meet again by chance and begin to feel a mutual sense of rivalry and attraction. After filming a sponsor video together, they hook up in Shane's hotel room. Over the course of several years, Shane and Ilya continue to secretly meet for sexual encounters when their teams are in the same city. Both feel as though their relationship cannot go beyond casual sex, given their ongoing rivalry, and homophobia within their sport and in Russia.

After a hookup, Ilya asks Shane to stay at his home and spend time with him. Shane realizes that Ilya feels romantically towards him, and is alarmed by his own realization that he himself would like more from their relationship. Shane has not yet come to terms with his attraction to men, and he fears that a relationship between himself and Ilya would conflict with their careers. While Ilya is bisexual and frequently engages in casual relationships with women, Shane recognizes that he is gay after briefly dating Rose Landry, a famous actress with whom he remains friends.

Shane and Ilya are assigned as teammates at an All-Star Game and reconcile, agreeing to be friends. Later that year, Ilya suddenly withdraws from a game, and Shane reaches out to him, learning that Ilya's abusive father has died after a long struggle with Alzheimer's disease. Both are forced to confront their deepening feelings for each other. Ilya contemplates ending their relationship, fearing that the romantic relationship they want is incompatible with their careers.

Shane invites Ilya to spend two weeks together at Shane's remote summer cottage in Ontario, which would give them the privacy they need to spend time together. While Ilya is initially hesitant, he accepts after Scott Hunter, another famous NHL player, wins the Stanley Cup and publicly announces his relationship with another man. (Note: As shown in Game Changer (2018)) During their time together, Shane and Ilya confess their mutual love for each other and agree to start a romantic relationship. Ilya also reveals that his mother had severe depression and died by suicide. The two are accidentally discovered together by Shane's parents, who are surprised, but ultimately accept Shane's sexuality and his relationship with Ilya.

To make their relationship easier, Ilya signs a contract with the NHL team in Ottawa. Ilya and Shane also plan to create a joint charity, a mental health organization named in honor of Ilya's mother, both to use their wealth for a cause that matters to them, and to provide a pretext for the end of their public rivalry. They agree to eventually announce their relationship to the public after they both retire from the NHL. In the meantime, they publicly announce their joint charity and friendship, to the surprise of the press.

== Reception ==
Rachel Kurzius of The Washington Post praised Heated Rivalry and credited it with getting her "hooked" on the gay hockey romance genre. Rolling Stone Philippines called the novel "steamy" and a "prose masterpiece", noting that "There is nothing subtle about Reid’s style of writing". In a review of The Long Game, Publishers Weekly wrote, “Reid's characters ... are all charming and sexy, and she mixes humor, hockey, and positive messaging with aplomb.”

It took nearly a year after publication for Heated Rivalry to gain attention, which happened after romance novelist Cat Sebastian recommended the novel on social media; Reid called Sebastian's recommendation "a real turning point" in attracting readers. The Sydney Morning Herald described the Game Changers series as "hugely popular". Heated Rivalry had been a popular bestseller since its debut, but sales increased exponentially with the sudden popularity of the television series, which also attracted a new readership to Heated Rivalry and the hockey romance subgenre. Several of Reid's novels subsequently appeared on the New York Times Best Seller list. As of December 2025, Harlequin had sold more than 650,000 books in the Game Changers series.

After Mayor of New York City Zohran Mamdani encouraged citizens to stay home during the January 2026 North American winter storm and revealed that those with a New York Public Library card could access the Heated Rivalry e-book or audiobook for free, the book's downloads surged by 529%.

== Sequels ==
Heated Rivalry is the second book in Reid's Game Changers series. In 2022, she released The Long Game, a sequel to Heated Rivalry and the sixth book in the series. In that novel, Shane and Ilya have been secretly dating for ten years, but face challenges as Ilya wants to finally go public with their relationship. The Long Game made the USA Today Best Seller list in 2023.

Unrivaled, the third Shane and Ilya novel, was initially scheduled for release on September 29, 2026. In February 2026, Reid announced that she was pushing back the release to June 2027, citing "the time demands of sudden fame and the worsening symptoms of Parkinson's disease." This will be the seventh book in the Game Changers series.

In addition to the novel sequels, Reid also shared a short story on her blog, "My Dinner with Hayden" (2019), which is set in Montreal in November 2018, before the epilogue of Heated Rivalry. In the story, Shane and Ilya host Shane's teammate Hayden Pike and his wife Jackie for dinner, where an uncomfortable discussion about relationships leads Ilya to reflect on his relationship with Shane and reaffirm his feelings for him.

== Television adaptation ==
The novel was adapted into the Crave television series Heated Rivalry, which debuted on November 28, 2025. Created, written, and directed by Jacob Tierney, it stars Hudson Williams as Shane Hollander and Connor Storrie as Ilya Rozanov. Season one also partially adapts Reid's 2018 novel Game Changer, which depicts closeted American hockey player Scott Hunter (François Arnaud) falling for barista Kip Grady (Robbie G.K.). Season two will adapt The Long Game, Reid's sequel to Heated Rivalry.
