= Robbie G.K. =

Canadian actor (born 1996)

- Graham-Kuntz in 2026
- Born: July 25, 1996 (age 30); Port Credit, Mississauga, Ontario, Canada
- Occupations: Actor; singer; dancer
- Years active: 2008–present
- Known for: Heated Rivalry; Utopia Falls

Robbie Graham-Kuntz (born July 25, 1996), known professionally as Robbie G.K., is a Canadian actor, singer, and dancer. He is known for his role as Christopher "Kip" Grady in the 2025 television series Heated Rivalry.

== Early life and education ==
Robbie Graham-Kuntz was born on July 25, 1996, and was raised in Port Credit, Ontario. He began his professional acting career at age 13 when he was cast as Kurt von Trapp in the Mirvish production of The Sound of Music at the Princess of Wales Theatre.

He attended the Etobicoke School of the Arts in Toronto as a musical theatre major, where he trained in acting, singing, and dance.

== Career ==
Graham-Kuntz began his on-screen career in 2013 as Charlie in the Canadian teen drama series The Next Step. Following this, he appeared in several Canadian productions, including the gymnastics-themed film Full Out and the horror film Antisocial 2. In 2020, he played the recurring role of Tempo 3 in the Hulu sci-fi musical series Utopia Falls.

In 2023, Graham-Kuntz adopted Robbie G.K. as professional name. He appeared in the film The House Call and the thriller Marry F*** Kill. In 2025, he appeared in the American comedy drama television series Overcompensating and the police procedural drama television series Sheriff Country. That year, he was also cast in the role of smoothie-shop barista Christopher "Kip" Grady in the Canadian sports romance television series Heated Rivalry, based on Canadian writer Rachel Reid's Game Changers book series.

== Personal life ==
Graham-Kuntz plays rugby for a club in Vancouver and has played with the Charlottetown Rugby Football Club.

His grandfather is a Grey Cup champion.

== Acting credits ==
=== Film ===
Year	Title	Role	Ref.
2015	Antisocial 2	Joey	
2015	Full Out	Adam	
2016	Golden Boys	Young Dylan	
2023	Marry F*** Kill	Simon Carpenter	
2023	The House Call	Joey	
TBA	Sundowning †		

=== Television ===
Key
Clock	Denotes television productions that have not yet been released

Year	Title	Role	Notes	Ref.
2013–2014	The Next Step	Charlie	12 episodes	
2017	The Stanley Dynamic	Wes	Episode: "The Stanley Mascot"	
2020	Utopia Falls	Tempo 3	10 episodes	
2021	The Community Players	Dean	Episode: "The Curse"	
2025	Overcompensating	Riley	3 episodes	
2025	Sheriff Country	Deputy Chris Whitley	2 episodes	
2025–present	Heated Rivalry	Christopher "Kip" Grady	3 episodes	
TBA	Meatballs †	TBA		

=== Theatre ===
Year	Title	Role	Notes	Ref.
2008	The Sound of Music	Kurt von Trapp	Toronto, Ontario	
2014	The Nutcracker	Courtier	Toronto, Ontario	
2015	Alice Through the Looking Glass	Lion	Charlottetown, PEI	
2016	Mamma Mia!	Ensemble / Pepper	Charlottetown, PEI	
2017	Anne of Green Gables: The Musical	Willie Boulter	Charlottetown, PEI	
2017	Joseph and the Amazing Technicolor Dreamcoat	Benjamin	Hamilton, Ontario	
2018	The House of Martin Guerre	Phillipe	Charlottetown, PEI	
2024	Medea, the Musical	Argonaut	Hamilton, Ontario	

== Awards and nominations ==
Awards and nominations received by Robbie G.K.
Award	Year (Note: The listed year refers to the date of the ceremony, not necessarily the year in which the work was released/premiered.)	Category	Nominated Work	Result	Ref.
ACTRA Toronto Awards	2026	Members' Choice Series Ensemble	Heated Rivalry	Won	
Gold Derby TV Awards	2026	Ensemble of the Year	Heated Rivalry	Won	
Gold Derby TV Awards	2026	Drama Supporting Actor	Heated Rivalry	Nominated	
