= Jackson Parrell =

Jackson Parrell is a Canadian cinematographer based in Toronto, Ontario. He is most noted as a two-time Canadian Screen Award winner for Best Photography in a Drama Program or Series, winning at the 7th Canadian Screen Awards in 2019 for Anne with an E, and at the 14th Canadian Screen Awards in 2026 for Heated Rivalry.

In 2026 he was also a nominee for Best Photography in a Comedy Program or Series, for his work on North of North.

== Awards ==
Award	Year	Category	Work	Result	Ref.
Canadian Screen Awards	2019	Photography in a drama program or series	Anne with an E: "Youth Is the Season of Hope"	Won	
Canadian Screen Awards	2026	Photography in a drama program or series	Heated Rivalry: "I'll Believe in Anything"	Won	
Canadian Screen Awards	2026	Photography in a comedy series	North of North: "Top of the World"	Nominated	
