= Olympians (Heated Rivalry) =

- Heated Rivalry episode
- Episode no.: Season 1 Episode 2
- Directed by: Jacob Tierney
- Written by: Jacob Tierney
- Based on: Heated Rivalry Part Two by Rachel Reid
- Cinematography by: Jackson Parrell
- Editing by: Arthur Tarnowski
- Original air date: November 28, 2025
- Running time: 43 minutes

Episode chronology
← Previous "Rookies"	Next → "Hunter"

"Olympians" is the second episode of the first season of the Canadian sports romance television series Heated Rivalry, created by Jacob Tierney and based on Rachel Reid's Game Changers novel series. Written and directed by Tierney, the episode was released on Crave on November 28, 2025, alongside the series premiere "Rookies".

The first season primarily adapts Heated Rivalry (2019), the second novel in the Game Changers series, which follows rival professional hockey players Shane Hollander (Hudson Williams) and Ilya Rozanov (Connor Storrie), whose on-ice animosity conceals a passionate, secret romantic relationship.

"Olympians" received highly positive reviews from critics, with particular praise for the writing, character development, and performances of Williams and Storrie.

== Plot ==
Shane and Ilya begin sexting over the course of two years, maintaining contact while playing for rival teams. In the fall of 2013, following a game, they meet privately at Shane's apartment and have penetrative sex for the first time.

During the 2014 Winter Olympics in Sochi, Ilya serves as captain of the Russian national team. After Russia performs poorly, Ilya becomes withdrawn and stops responding to Shane's messages. Following a discussion with his friends Scott Hunter (François Arnaud) and Carter Vaughn (Kolton Stewart), where the latter commends the bravery of presumably gay figure skaters performing in conservative Russia, Shane attempts to support Ilya in person, but is met with hostility.

At an Olympic gala, Svetlana (Ksenia Daniela Kharlamova) intervenes to shield him from uncomfortable interactions with both of their overbearing fathers. She later leaves Ilya alone with Sasha (Kaden Connors), a former sexual partner, but Ilya rejects Sasha's advances.

Ilya continues to distance himself from Shane and focuses on hockey, ultimately leading his team to win the MLH championship. In the summer of 2014, the two reunite at the MLH Awards. Shane later expresses frustration with Ilya for being distant, and Ilya proposes that they meet privately later that night, during which the two have sex again.

Afterwards, when Shane attempts to discuss Ilya's situation in Russia and the emotional consequences of their relationship, Ilya shuts down, causing Shane to leave feeling dejected.

== Production ==
=== Development and writing ===
In January 2025, Crave announced it was developing a television adaptation of Heated Rivalry, the second novel in Rachel Reid's Game Changers series. The series, centered on rival hockey players Shane Hollander and Ilya Rozanov whose competition conceals a secret romantic relationship, was commissioned by Bell Media and produced by Accent Aigu Entertainment under Jacob Tierney and Brendan Brady. Tierney and Brady serve as executive producers, with Reid attached as a consulting producer, and Bell Media handling international distribution. Tierney also acted as the sole writer for the first season.

==== Changes from the source material ====
The episode introduces a notable change from the novel in its depiction of Ilya's relationship with Svetlana. In the book, Svetlana is depicted primarily as a casual sexual partner, whereas the series reimagines her as a close childhood friend who is deeply aware of Ilya's personal life and family pressures. This change places more emphasis on Ilya's isolation and the need for a trusted confidante as the series expands on his strained family dynamics. Ksenia Daniela Kharlamova, who portrays Svetlana, acknowledged the differences from the source material, stating that while the adaptation departs significantly from the book, she viewed the change positively. Kharlamova noted that the revised characterization allowed the series to better serve the pacing and emotional needs of television storytelling, adding that the adjustment "extrapolated on their world and relationship" and ultimately strengthened the narrative.

The episode expands on Ilya's sexual history by revising the depiction of his first same-sex encounter. In the novel, Ilya's former sexual partner remains unnamed and unseen. The series reimagines this figure as a named minor character Sasha and further alters the timeline by having him reappear in Ilya's adult life, where the two are reintroduced through their mutual friend Svetlana. The episode also alters the pacing of Shane and Ilya's early relationship. In the book, their physical relationship develops more quickly, supported by internal monologue, whereas the series extends the period between their initial encounters and sexual relationship in order to foreground emotional tension, longing, and the gradual development of intimacy onscreen.

=== Casting ===
"Olympians" stars Hudson Williams as Shane Hollander, Connor Storrie as Ilya Rozanov, François Arnaud as Scott Hunter, and Ksenia Daniela Kharlamova as Svetlana Vetrova. The supporting cast includes Callan Potter and Benjamin Roy as Shane's teammates Hayden Pike and JJ Dagenais, Kolton Stewart as Scott's teammate Carter Vaughn, Franco Lo Presti as Ilya's teammate Cliff Marleau, Yaroslav Poverlo as Ilya's father Grigori Rozanov, Kamilla Kowal as Hayden's wife Jackie, and Kaden Connors as Sasha.

=== Filming ===
Principal photography for the first season began in April 2025 and took place over approximately 36 to 37 days. Filming was conducted out of order, with Jacob Tierney directing all six episodes.

Filming took place across Ontario, with the FirstOntario Concert Hall used for the MLH Awards ceremony, including the stage presentation, bathroom sequence, and post-awards party, while a mansion on Rocmary Place in Vaughan doubled as Ilya's home in Russia and the setting for a reception hosted by Russian diplomats, including the scene where Ilya reunited with Sasha. All hockey-related scenes, including locker rooms, ice surfaces, and spectator stands, were filmed at the Sleeman Centre in Guelph.

The hockey sequences required an intensive and carefully scheduled production period. All hockey-related scenes were filmed during a single block later in the shoot, with the cast not stepping onto the ice until approximately the fourth week of production. Williams, Storrie, and Arnaud trained extensively with a hockey coach in preparation for the scenes. Although the on-ice material represents a relatively small portion of the finished episodes, filming these sequences was time-consuming, spanning roughly three full weeks of production.

Other scenes were filmed earlier in the schedule, with the Las Vegas penthouse scenes among the first material filmed. In an interview with Variety, Williams recalled that the sex scene was physically demanding and initially awkward, noting that while intimacy coordination and protective measures were in place, the physicality of the staging caused some discomfort. Williams also emphasized that any initial unease quickly gave way to a supportive working environment, describing the set as professional and affirming once he realized that the crew was "warm and really passionate about the show," which made him feel comfortable performing nude scenes.

Due to the episode's extensive sexual content, intimacy coordinator Chala Hunter was present throughout production to oversee the staging of intimate scenes. Hunter worked closely with Tierney, Storrie, and Williams to establish boundaries, choreograph physical interactions, and ensure that scenes were performed safely and consensually. In an interview with GQ, the two actors stated that intimate scenes throughout the series were carefully planned and executed under her supervision, while still allowing for what Hunter described as "artistic interpretation."

In an interview with Vulture, Hunter described how her work on the episode extended beyond logistical oversight to shaping how intimacy was communicated on screen through precise, actor-led physical storytelling. For Shane and Ilya's first penetrative sex scene, she guided Williams and Storrie in developing a shared physical vocabulary so that emotional and narrative beats could be clearly conveyed without explicit detail, encouraging the actors to consider intention, power, and care through movement, pacing, and touch rather than dialogue. She also played a key role in the Las Vegas penthouse sequence, the first intimate scene filmed for the series, where her oversight focused on establishing tone, maintaining continuity with the characters' emotional progression, and managing practical challenges on set, including choreography and camera framing, to preserve both performance integrity and performer comfort throughout repeated takes.

Tierney later revealed to Gold Derby that the stairwell kiss following Shane and Ilya's first penetrative sex scene was improvised by Storrie. Tierney explained that although the moment was not scripted, it aligned with the emotional hesitation required at that point in the story. He recalled responding positively to the choice, stating, "I love it. I just want to watch them kiss each other," and added that the exchange naturally came together during filming when Ilya takes Shane's hoodie.

=== Music ===
The series' musical score was composed by Peter Peter, and includes the original song "It's You", written by Peter and featured during Shane and Ilya's first penetrative sex scene in the episode. The track, alongside the series' opening theme song "Rivalry", was released as a single from the series' original soundtrack album on January 9, 2026, through Milan Records.

In addition to its original score, the episode featured several needle drop tracks, most notably "Mangetout" by British indie rock band Wet Leg. According to Billboard, the song's appearance in the episode had led to a surge in official on-demand streaming in the United States.

== Release ==
"Olympians" premiered on November 28, 2025, on Crave, where it was released alongside the series premiere "Rookies". The premiere date was announced with the release of the series' official trailer on October 9.

Prior to its debut, the series secured multiple international distribution agreements. In the United States and Australia, the first two episode premiered simultaneously with Crave via HBO Max. In New Zealand, the series streamed on Sky-owned Neon, with the two episodes released on November 30, 2025. In Spain, the episode and the rest of the season are scheduled to premiere on Movistar Plus+ on February 5, 2026. In the Philippines, the episode, along with the remainder of the season excluding the finale, was released on December 19, 2025, on HBO Max. Additional distribution agreements later brought the series to Sky and Now in the United Kingdom and Ireland, where the entire first season premiered on January 10, 2026.

== Reception ==
=== Critical response ===
"Olympians" was met with highly positive reviews from critics. Mads Misasi of Tell-Tale TV gave the episode a perfect 5-star rating, praising its opening montage as "genius" and highlighting how Storrie and Williams convey character development through "physical acting of their body language and expressions" without dialogue, adding that the actors "really step up their game" in the episode's more tender moments. Christine Kinori of The Review Geek awarded the episode 4.5 out of 5 stars, describing it as "another steamy episode that leaves us wanting more," and praising how the intimacy "tells us more about where things stand between the two," while also exploring themes of emotional distance, vulnerability, and pressure in professional sports.

Writing for Fangirlish, Lissete Lanuza Sáenz described the episode as "a very big step forward for the story, and for the relationship between Shane and Ilya," noting that while the first episode focused heavily on physical intimacy, the second one begins to reveal "what's really behind the masks these two characters wear," with Williams and Storrie making "little things count" in their performances.

=== Audience viewership ===
Upon its two-episode premiere, Heated Rivalry ranked fourth on JustWatch's television streaming chart during the week of December 7, 2025. Meanwhile, Whip Media, drawing on data from its TV Time viewership tracking platform of more than 25 million users, reported that the series placed sixth during the same period. According to FlixPatrol, which aggregates streaming performance data, the series ranked second on HBO Max's Top 10 most-watched series chart in the United States and Australia on November 29, behind It: Welcome to Derry.
