= List of accolades received by Heated Rivalry =

Heated Rivalry awards and nominations
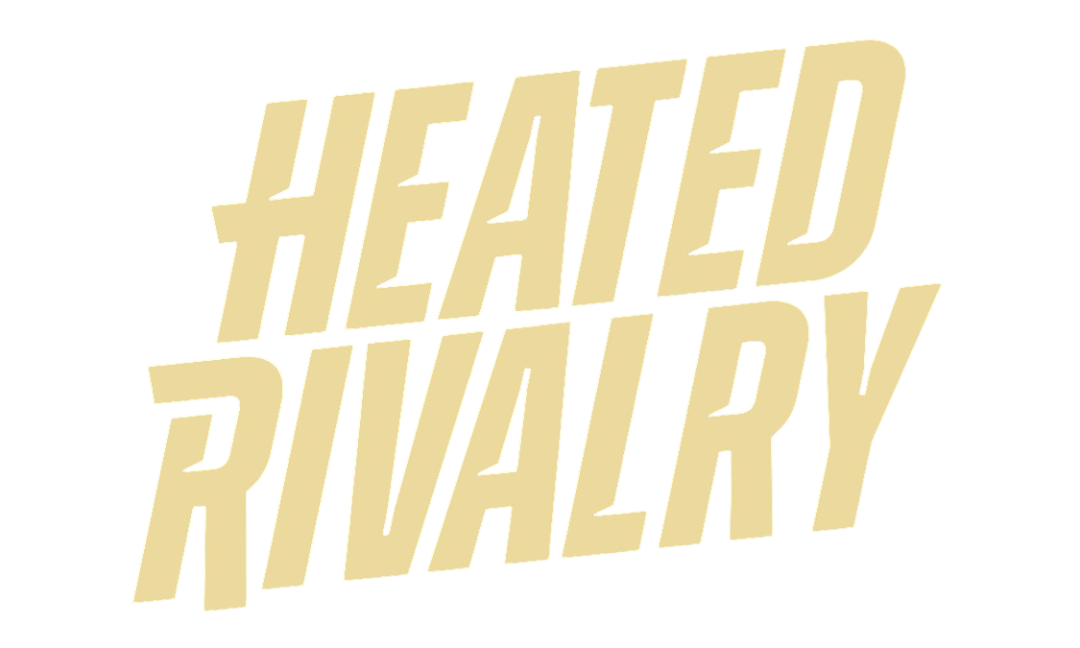
Awards and nominations
Award	Wins	Nominations
Academy of Television Arts & Sciences	1	1
ACTRA Montreal Awards	1	2
ACTRA Toronto Awards	1	1
Astra TV Awards	0	2
Banff Rockie Awards	0	1
BMI Film & TV Awards	1	1
Canadian Cinema Editors Awards	2	2
Canadian Media Producers Association	0	1
Canadian Screen Awards	16	19
Canadian Sync Awards	2	2
Critics Choice Awards Celebration	1	1
Dorian TV Awards	4	8
GLAAD Media Awards	1	1
Gold Derby Awards	6	10
National Television Awards	0	1
The NYC LGBT Community Center	1	1
Peabody Awards	1	1
Queerty Awards	2	2
Society of Composers, Authors and Music Publishers of Canada	1	1
TCA Awards	1	5
Webby Awards	3	5

Totals (Note: Certain award groups do not simply award one winner. They acknowledge several different recipients, have runners-up, and have third place. Since this is a specific recognition and is different from losing an award, runner-up mentions are considered wins in this award tally. For simplification and to avoid errors, each award in this list has been presumed to have had a prior nomination.)
- Wins: 45
- Nominations: 68

Heated Rivalry is a Canadian sports romance television series created, written, and directed by Jacob Tierney for Crave. Based on the Game Changers book series by Rachel Reid, the show takes its title from the 2019 second instalment. It stars Hudson Williams as Shane Hollander and Connor Storrie as Ilya Rozanov, two professional hockey players who maintain a secret long-term romantic relationship while playing for rival teams. The series premiered on November 28, 2025, and received critical acclaim, with particular praise for Tierney's direction, the writing, and the performances and chemistry between lead actors; (Note: The first season holds a 96% approval rating based on 88 reviews on Rotten Tomatoes and a score of 67 based on 7 reviews on Metacritic.) it also became the most-watched original series on Crave.

Heated Rivalry is ineligible for consideration at the Primetime Emmy Awards because it does not meet the Academy of Television Arts & Sciences's eligibility requirements for US co-productions. Although HBO Max later acquired the series, it became involved only after the first season had been completed, meaning the show was not developed as a US co-production from the outset. Despite its ineligibility for the regular competitive Emmy Awards, the Academy did select it for the Television Academy Honors Award, its special award for television programming that advances positive social change.

Similarly, American actor Storrie is ineligible for consideration at the Canadian Screen Awards due to a rule change that took effect at the 14th ceremony, which restricts eligibility to Canadian citizens and permanent residents. The show itself would normally have had to wait until the 15th Canadian Screen Awards in 2027 for award consideration, due to not premiering until two weeks after the eligibility cutoff date for the 2026 awards, but the Academy of Canadian Cinema and Television acknowledged that the producers submitted a request for consideration under the appeals process, which was granted. Following this ruling, Heated Rivalry dominated the award ceremony, winning all of its categories, including Best Drama Series.

== Awards and nominations ==
Awards and nominations received by Heated Rivalry
Award	Year (Note: The listed year refers to the date of the ceremony, not necessarily the year in which the corresponding season or episode aired.)	Category	Nominee(s)	Result	Ref.
Academy of Television Arts & Sciences	2026	Television Academy Honors Award	Heated Rivalry	Honoured	
ACTRA Montreal Awards	2026	Outstanding Performance in TV	François Arnaud	Won	
ACTRA Montreal Awards	2026	Outstanding Performance in TV	Sophie Nélisse	Nominated	
ACTRA Toronto Awards	2026	Members' Choice Series Ensemble	Heated Rivalry	Won	
Astra TV Awards	2026	Drama Series	Heated Rivalry	Nominated	
Astra TV Awards	2026	Book to Screen	Heated Rivalry	Nominated	
Banff Rockie Awards	2026	Drama Series: English Language	Heated Rivalry	Nominated	
BMI Film & TV Awards	2026	Streaming Media	Peter Peter	Won	
Canadian Cinema Editors Awards	2026	Best Editing in TV Drama / Mini Series	Véronique Barbe (Ep.5 – "I'll Believe in Anything")	Won	
Canadian Cinema Editors Awards	2026	The Assistant Editor Recognition	Geneviève Roberge	Won	
Canadian Media Producers Association	2026	TV Producer Indiescreen Award	Brendan Brady and Jacob Tierney	Nominated	
Canadian Screen Awards	2026	Best Drama Series	Jacob Tierney, Brendan Brady	Won	
Canadian Screen Awards	2026	Best Direction, Drama Series	Jacob Tierney	Won	
Canadian Screen Awards	2026	Best Writing, Drama Series	Jacob Tierney	Won	
Canadian Screen Awards	2026	Best Photography, Drama	Jackson Parrell	Won	
Canadian Screen Awards	2026	Best Picture Editing, Drama	Véronique Barbe	Won	
Canadian Screen Awards	2026	Best Picture Editing, Drama	Arthur Tarnowski	Nominated	
Canadian Screen Awards	2026	Best Sound, Fiction	Vincent Riendeau, Martin Messier, Joe Scandella, Natalie Fleurant, Simon Meilleur, Eric Med Lagacé, Peter Lopata and Valéry Dufort-Boucher	Won	
Canadian Screen Awards	2026	Best Production Design or Art Direction, Fiction	Aidan Leroux	Won	
Canadian Screen Awards	2026	Best Costume Design	Hanna Puley	Won	
Canadian Screen Awards	2026	Best Visual Effects	Simon Devault, Philippe Massonnat, Christophe Trepanier and Felix Arsenault	Won	
Canadian Screen Awards	2026	Best Original Music, Drama	Peter Peter	Won	
Canadian Screen Awards	2026	Best Original Music – Original Song	"It's You"	Won	
Canadian Screen Awards	2026	Best Lead Performer, Drama	François Arnaud	Nominated	
Canadian Screen Awards	2026	Best Lead Performer, Drama	Hudson Williams	Won	
Canadian Screen Awards	2026	Best Supporting Performer, Drama	Ksenia Daniela Kharlamova	Nominated	
Canadian Screen Awards	2026	Best Supporting Performer, Drama	Sophie Nélisse	Won	
Canadian Screen Awards	2026	Best Guest Performance, Drama Series	Nadine Bhabha	Won	
Canadian Screen Awards	2026	Best Achievement in Casting, Fiction	Jenny Lewis and Sara Kay	Won	
Canadian Screen Awards	2026	Cogeco Fund Audience Choice	Heated Rivalry	Won	
Canadian Sync Awards	2026	Best Sync - Soundtrack, Drama TV Series	Heated Rivalry (Season 1) (Music Supervisor: Scotty Taylor)	Won	
Canadian Sync Awards	2026	Best Sync - Scene, Episodic Series	Heated Rivalry – "I'll Believe in Anything" by Wolf Parade (Music Supervisor: Scotty Taylor)	Won	
Critics Choice Awards Celebration	2026	Showrunner Award	Jacob Tierney	Honoured	
Dorian TV Awards	2026	Best TV Drama	Heated Rivalry	Won	
Dorian TV Awards	2026	Best LGBTQ TV Show	Heated Rivalry	Won	
Dorian TV Awards	2026	Best Written TV Show	Heated Rivalry	Nominated	
Dorian TV Awards	2026	Most Visually Striking TV Show	Heated Rivalry	Nominated	
Dorian TV Awards	2026	Best TV Performance – Drama	Connor Storrie	Nominated	
Dorian TV Awards	2026	Best TV Performance – Drama	Hudson Williams	Nominated	
Dorian TV Awards	2026	Best Supporting TV Performance – Drama	François Arnaud	Won	
Dorian TV Awards	2026	GALECA LGBTQIA+ TV Trailblazer Award	Jacob Tierney	Won	
GLAAD Media Awards	2026	Outstanding New TV Series	Heated Rivalry	Won	
Gold Derby TV Awards	2026	Ensemble of the Year	Heated Rivalry	Won	
Gold Derby TV Awards	2026	Drama Series	Heated Rivalry	Won	
Gold Derby TV Awards	2026	Breakthrough artist of the year	Connor Storrie	Nominated	
Gold Derby TV Awards	2026	Breakthrough artist of the year	Hudson Williams	Won	
Gold Derby TV Awards	2026	Drama Actor	Connor Storrie	Nominated	
Gold Derby TV Awards	2026	Drama Actor	Hudson Williams	Won	
Gold Derby TV Awards	2026	Drama Supporting Actor	François Arnaud	Nominated	
Gold Derby TV Awards	2026	Drama Supporting Actor	Robbie G.K.	Nominated	
Gold Derby TV Awards	2026	Drama Episode	Heated Rivalry (Ep.6 - "The Cottage")	Won	
Gold Derby TV Awards	2026	Literary Adaptation	Heated Rivalry	Won	
National Television Awards	2026	New Drama	Heated Rivalry	Nominated	
The NYC LGBT Community Center	2026	Cultural Impact Award	Jacob Tierney and Brendan Brady	Honored	
Peabody Awards	2026	Entertainment	Heated Rivalry	Won	
Queerty Awards	2026	Best TV Drama	Heated Rivalry	Won	
Queerty Awards	2026	Best TV Performance	François Arnaud	Won	
Society of Composers, Authors and Music Publishers of Canada	2026	Breakthrough Screen Composer	Peter Peter	Won	
TCA Awards	2026	Program of the Year	Heated Rivalry	Won	
TCA Awards	2026	Outstanding Achievement in Drama	Heated Rivalry	Nominated	
TCA Awards	2026	Outstanding New Program	Heated Rivalry	Nominated	
TCA Awards	2026	Individual Achievement in Drama	Connor Storrie	Nominated	
TCA Awards	2026	Individual Achievement in Drama	Hudson Williams	Nominated	
Webby Awards	2026	Entertainment, General Social	Heated Rivalry Social – Bell Media	Nominated	
Webby Awards	2026	Television & Film, General Social	Heated Rivalry Social – Bell Media	Nominated	
Webby Awards	2026	Best Social Campaign, General Social	Heated Rivalry Social – Bell Media	Won	
Webby Awards	2026	Best Community or Fan Engagement – Media/Entertainment, Social Features	Heated Rivalry: Hudson Williams vs. Connor Storrie – Razorfish	Won	
Webby Awards	2026	Television & Film, Social Features	Heated Rivalry: Hudson Williams vs. Connor Storrie – Razorfish	Won	
