= Bell jar (disambiguation) =

Bell Jar can mean:

- Bell jar, a piece of glassware used mainly for scientific purposes
- The Bell Jar, a literary work by Sylvia Plath.
  - The Bell Jar (film): a 1979 film adaptation of that novel.
  - The Bell Jar (upcoming film): an upcoming film adaptation of that novel.
- "Bell Jar", a song by the Bangles from Everything (The Bangles album)
