= Sa-Hali Secondary School =

Location
- 255 Arrowstone Drive; Kamloops, British Columbia, V2C 1P8; Canada; 50.6639°N 120.3452°W

Information
- School type: Public, high school
- Founded: 1974
- School board: School District 73 Kamloops/Thompson
- School number: 07324057
- Principal: Jonathan Brady
- Grades: 8–12
- Enrollment: 988 (2022–2023)
- Language: English
- Colours: Blue, Red and White
- Mascot: Sabre
- Team name: Sabres
- Feeder schools: Beattie Elementary McGowan Park Elementary Pacific Way Elementary Summit Elementary 263 Hollyburn Drive
- Website: www.sd73.bc.ca/sahali
- Last updated: May 2026

Sa-Hali Secondary School is a public high school in Kamloops, British Columbia, Canada. It is a part of School District 73 Kamloops/Thompson. Sa-Hali serves grades 8–12 and it operates on a two semester system.

== Academics ==
Sa-Hali offers courses in social studies, English and modern languages, mathematics, business, physical education, technology/practical sciences, sciences, fine arts and special education.

== Extra-curriculars ==
In 2014, the Sa-Hali Junior Achievement team won 1st Place in the first-ever provincial JABC Innovation Jam. The team also won the People's Choice Award for the most "likes" on their YouTube video pitch.

== Athletics ==
In 2014, the Sa-Hali Sabres' Senior Girls' Volleyball Team won the British Columbia AA High School Girls' Provincial Volleyball Championship.

In 2010, the Sa-Hali Sabres' Boys' Soccer Team won the British Columbia AA High School Boys' Provincial Soccer Championships.

For the 2011–2012 high school athletic year, the Sa-Hali Sabres received the BC School Sports Outstanding School Award.

== Notable alumni ==
- Hudson Williams, actor
