= Westsyde Secondary School =

Location
- 855 Bebek Road; Kamloops, British Columbia, V2B 6P2; Canada; 50.76727°N 120.34822°W

Information
- School type: Public, high school
- Motto: Striving For Excellence
- School board: School District 73 Kamloops/Thompson
- School number: 7324055
- Principal: Mr. Domenic Comita
- Grades: 8-12
- Enrollment: 730 (September 9, 2011)
- Area: Westsyde
- Colours: Blue and White
- Team name: Whundas, Blue Wave
- Website: www.sd73.bc.ca/wss

Westsyde Secondary School, established in 1973 is a school in Kamloops, British Columbia, Canada.
