= Transaction Planet =

- Directed by: Connor Storrie
- Written by: Connor Storrie
- Produced by: Connor Storrie
- Starring: Gabe Kessler; Bailey Tait
- Running time: 90 minutes
- Country: United States
- Language: English

Transaction Planet is an upcoming micro-budget science fiction film written and directed by Connor Storrie, his feature directorial debut. The film was shot entirely with an iPhone camera.

== Premise ==
An alien spirit who incarnates a human body endures both the brutality of life and the beauty of human connection.

== Cast ==
- Gabe Kessler
- Bailey Tait

== Production ==
Storrie chose to pursue Transaction Planet after wrapping Heated Rivalry, and had conceived the story at least a year in advance. He credits the work of John Waters, Darren Aronofsky, and Sean Baker as key influences for the project. He approached the project aware that it would not be palatable for all audiences, stating that he would "rather swing big and miss the mark than try to please someone."

The film was made on a micro budget with a group of Storrie's "very close, inspiring artist friends". Storrie was heavily involved in all aspects of the production, being the director, writer, sole producer, and occasional makeup artist on the project. Filming began in October 2025 and wrapped in December 2025.
