= School District 73 Kamloops/Thompson =

School district in Kamloops, British Columbia, Canada

Location
- Kamloops Kamloops, Chase, Barriere, Clearwater, Logan Lake, Blue River, Brennan Creek, Heffley Creek, Pinantan Lake, Savona, Vavenby, Westwold in Okanagan/Mainline Canada

District information
- Superintendent: Mike St. John
- Schools: 53
- Budget: CA$258 million

Students and staff
- Students: 16,638 (as of 2025/2026 school year)
- Staff: 2,650 (as of 2025/2026 school year)

Other information
- Website: www.sd73.bc.ca

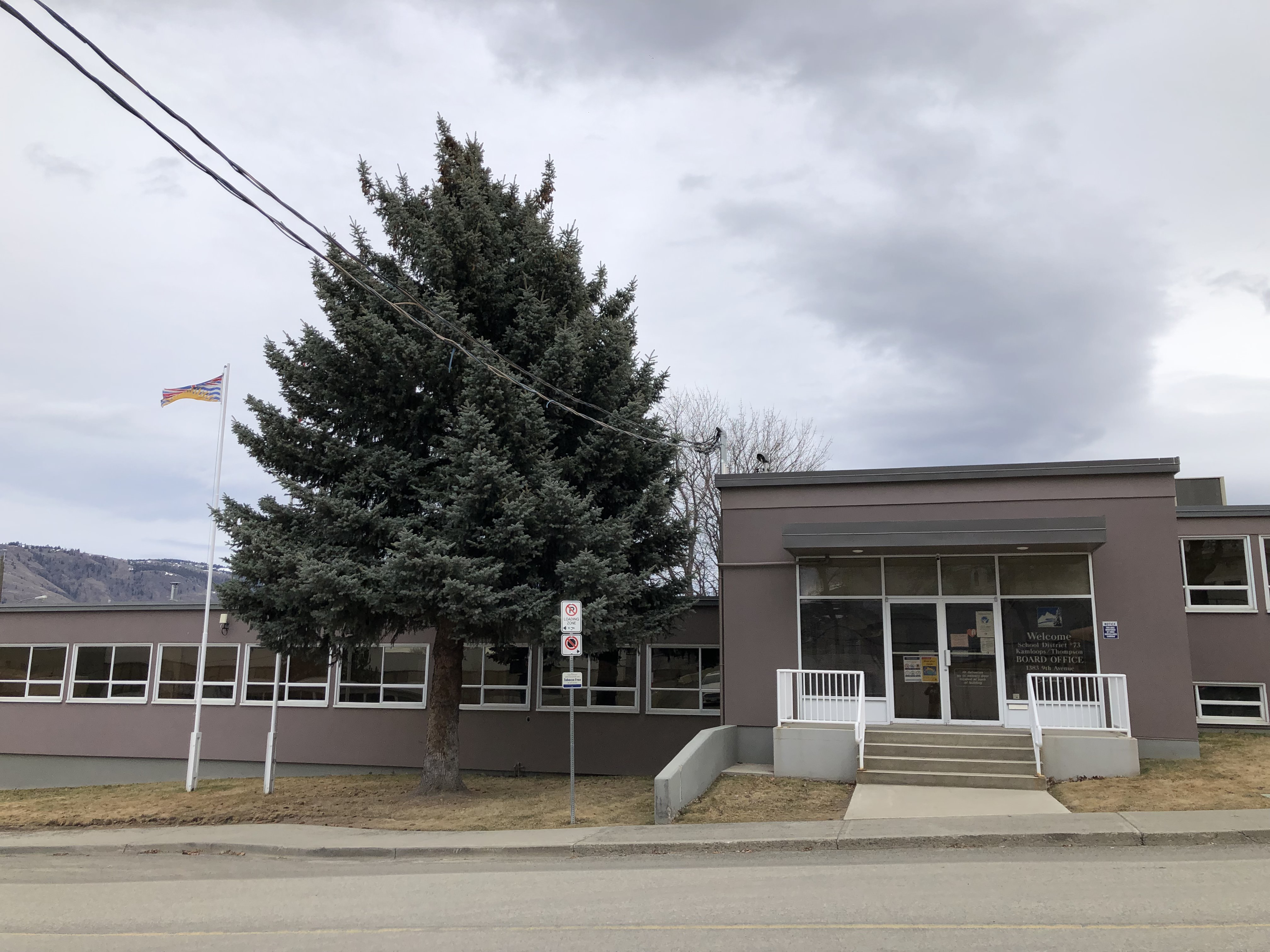
Kamloops/Thompson School District 73 Office

School District 73 Kamloops/Thompson a school district based in Kamloops, British Columbia, Canada.

The school board serves the city of Kamloops and the communities of Chase, Barriere, Clearwater, Logan Lake, Blue River, Brennan Creek, Heffley Creek, Pinantan Lake, Savona, Vavenby, and Westwold.

== History ==
School District 73 was created in 1996 with the merger of School District No. 24 Kamloops and School District No. 26 North Thompson.

== Schools ==
School	Location	Grades	Address
Aberdeen Elementary School	Kamloops	K-7	2191 Van Horne Dr, Aberdeen
AE Perry Elementary School	Kamloops	K-7	1380 Sherbrooke Ave, Brocklehurst
Arthur Hatton Elementary School	Kamloops	K-7	315 Chestnut Ave, North Kamloops
Arthur Stevenson Elementary School	Kamloops	K-7	1051 Pine Springs Rd, Westsyde
Barriere Elementary School	Barriere	K-7	4475 Airfield Rd
Barriere Secondary School	Barriere	8-12	4811 Barriere Town Rd
Beattie Elementary School	Kamloops	K-7 - Formerly Beattie School of the Arts	492 McGill Rd, Lower Sahali
Bert Edwards Science and Technology School	Kamloops	K-7	711 Windsor Ave, North Kamloops
Bridges Program	Kamloops	7-8	655 Holt St, Brocklehurst
Blue River Elementary School	Blue River	1-5	5913 3rd Ave
Brocklehurst Secondary School	Kamloops	8-12 - Formerly Brocklehurst Middle School	985 Windbreak St, Brocklehurst
Chase Secondary School	Chase	8-12	420 Cottonwood St
Clearwater Secondary School	Clearwater	8-12	440 Murtle Cres
Continuing Education School District 73	Kamloops	10-12	700 Tranquille Rd, North Kamloops
Dallas Elementary School	Kamloops	K-7	296 Harper Rd, Dallas
David Thompson Elementary School	Kamloops	K-7	1051 Pine Springs Rd, Westsyde
Dufferin Elementary School	Kamloops	K-7	1880 Hillside Dr, Mount Dufferin
Four Directions Secondary School	Kamloops	8-12	655 Holt St, Brocklehurst
George Hilliard Elementary School	Kamloops	K-7	985 Holt St, Brocklehurst
Haldane Elementary School	Chase	K-7	530 Cottonwood St
Heffley Creek Elementary School	Kamloops	K-3	7020 Old Highway 5, Heffley Creek
Juniper Ridge Elementary School	Kamloops	K-7	2540 Qu'Appelle Blvd, Juniper Ridge
Kamloops Open Online Learning	Kamloops	K-12	1770 Springview Pl, Upper Sahali
Kamloops School of the Arts	Kamloops	K-12	1390 9th Ave, Sagebrush
Kay Bingham Elementary School	Kamloops	K-7	950 Southill St, Brocklehurst
Lloyd George Elementary School	Kamloops	K-7	830 Pine St, Sagebrush
Logan Lake Elementary School	Logan Lake	K-7	4 Galena Ave
Logan Lake Elementary-Secondary School	Logan Lake	K-12	50 Ponderosa Ave
Marion Schilling Elementary School	Kamloops	K-7	2200 Park Dr, Valleyview
McGowan Park Elementary School	Kamloops	K-7	2080 Tremerton Dr, Upper Sahali
NorKam Secondary School	Kamloops	8-12	730 12th St, North Kamloops
Directed Suspension Program	Kamloops	8-12	675 Victoria St, Downtown
Pacific Way Elementary School	Kamloops	K-7	2330 Pacific Way, Aberdeen
Parkcrest Elementary School	Kamloops	K-7 - Reopening 2024	2170 Parkcrest Ave, Brocklehurst
Pinantan Elementary School	Pinantan Lake	K-6	2540 Hines Rd
Raft River Elementary School	Clearwater	K-6	801 Clearwater Village Rd
Ralph Bell Elementary School	Kamloops	K-7 - Reopened 2022	1764 Valleyview Dr, Valleyview
Rayleigh Elementary School	Kamloops	K-7	306 Puett Ranch Rd, Rayleigh
Robert L. Clemitson Elementary School	Kamloops	K-7	5990 Todd Rd, Barnhartvale
Sa-Hali Secondary School	Kamloops	8-12	255 Arrowstone Dr, Upper Sahali
Savona Elementary School	Savona	K-7	600 Tingley St
South Kamloops Secondary School	Kamloops	8-12	821 Munro St, Sagebrush
South Sa-Hali Elementary School	Kamloops	K-7	1585 Summit Dr, Lower Sahali
Summit Elementary School	Kamloops	K-7	425 Monarch Crt, Lower Sahali
Sun Peaks School	Sun Peaks	K-9	4040 Sundance Dr
Twin Rivers Education Centre	Kamloops	9-12	655 Holt St, Brocklehurst
Valleyview Secondary School	Kamloops	8-12	1950 Valleyview Dr, Valleyview
Vavenby Elementary School	Vavenby	K-7	3157 Galiano Rd
Westmount Elementary School	Kamloops	K-7	745 Walkem Rd, Westsyde
Westsyde Elementary School	Kamloops	K-7 - Reopened, September 2019	3550 Westsyde Rd, Westsyde
Westsyde Secondary School	Kamloops	8-12	855 Bebek Rd, Westsyde
Westwold Elementary School	Westwold	K-7	5408 Hwy 97C
