= Pinantan Lake =

- Community
- Location of Pinantan Lake in British Columbia
- Coordinates: 50°42′59″N 120°02′04″W
- Country: Canada
- Province: British Columbia
- Region: Thompson Country
- Regional district: Thompson-Nicola
- Time zone: UTC−07:00 (PT)
- Area codes: 250, 778, 236, & 672

Pinantan Lake is an unincorporated community, encircling the larger lake of the same name, in the Thompson region of south central British Columbia. The locality is by road about 20 kilometres (12 mi) northwest of Pritchard and 31 kilometres (19 mi) northeast of Kamloops.

== Lake description ==
At the bottom of a shallow valley, the lake is 880 metres (2,880 ft) above sea level and the surface area is 68 hectares (168 acres). The mean depth is 10.6 metres (35 ft) and maximum depth is 18.5 metres (61 ft). The shoreline, which drops off sharply, largely comprises cattails and bulrushes. The southeast end, which is marshy, includes willows and some water birches behind the shoreline. Northeast of Big Pinantan Lake lies Little Pinantan Lake, which has similar characteristics.

== Name origin ==
Until the early 1900s, the general area was known as Black Valley. Alexander McBryan and Donald G. McPherson, who arrived in 1873, were the earliest settlers in the area. George Wilson, who came around 1887, owned property at the northwest end of the lake, which Antoine Pene bought in 1904. One theory is that the lake was called Pininkantan at the time. A different unconfirmed claim was the name is a First Nations word for moccasin, which describes the shape of the lake. In 1913, Pene built a fishing lodge, which he advertised as Penantan Lodge (a pun on his name). An alternative theory indicates this spelling quickly morphed into Pinantan for the area and lake. The name comes from the Secwepmcstín word for Pinantan, which is Pencentén.

== Earlier community ==
Census population: Pinantan
Year	Pop.	±%
1951	103	—
1956	72	−30.1%
1961		—
1966		—
1971	54	—
1976	241	+346.3%
Source: Statistics Canada * Later online census figures do not split out Pinantan.

Peter Botta arrived around 1900, followed by a flood of new settlers. Opposite the former school site, he built a large residence/lodge on the hill as an overnight stage stop. A post office existed 1912–1955 and a school 1916–1958.

When the Botta lodge burned down in 1926, resulting in an estimated $10,000 loss, a smaller building replaced it. In 1936, fire totally destroyed the McDonald sawmill.

In 1968, electricity transmission extended into the area.

In 1976, a post office opened within the general store. When a new school opened in September 1978, all the classes were held in portables. About this time, a referendum favoured raising taxes to acquire a pumper truck and erect a firehall for the fledgeling volunteer fire department. Months later, the decision was reversed. In November 1988, a permanent school building replaced the portables.

== Recreation ==
The lake was first stocked in 1908 and officially opened to fishing in 1912. The popularity of the fishing drew Admiral Sir Cyril Thomas Moulden Fuller to visit in 1928.

The Pinantan Resort, which opened in 1937 on a property adjacent to the former Pene one, had many owners over the following years. A trout hatchery operated at the lake in the late 1940s.

The Pinantan Lake Resort is a 5.7-hectare (14-acre) lakefront property, which provides cabin accommodation, a private beach, and kayak/paddleboard rentals. Boating power upon the lake is restricted to electric motors of up to 7.5 kW. In a setting of abundant wildlife, the lake is popular for fishing, swimming, kayaking, and canoeing. Beneath the frozen surface from November to mid-April, rainbow trout are plentiful.

== Later community ==
The former schoolhouse, 5 kilometres (3 mi) east of Pinantan, has continued to be used for community events.

In 2012, the fire brigade acquired its first fire truck. Unlike the well organized and funded departments overseen by the regional district, the operation has depended upon community fundraising. In 2014, the general store burned to the ground but rebuilding began several months later. The next year, a referendum rejected the proposition for a tax funded firehall. In 2016, the fire truck was advertised for sale.

Pinantan Lake Elementary is part of School District 73 Kamloops/Thompson. The school and general store/post office serve the community of about 150 residential or recreational lots.

In early 2023, break-ins, auto thefts, and minor crime peaked after escalating over a couple of years.

== Notable people ==
- Richard Wagamese (1955–2017), author and journalist, resident.
