= NorKam Secondary School =

Location
- 730 12th St; Kamloops, British Columbia, V2B 3C1; Canada; 50.6991°N 120.3711°W

Information
- Former name: NorKam Secondary School
- School type: Public, high school
- Motto: Knowledge is power
- Founded: 1967
- School board: School District 73 Kamloops/Thompson
- Principal: Ms. Rachael Sdoutz
- Grades: 8 to 12
- Enrollment: 1,300 (2022-2023)
- Language: English/French
- Colours: Maroon, Gold, White and Black
- Mascot: The Saint
- Team name: Saints
- Feeder schools: AE Perry Elementary; Arthur Hatton Elementary; Bert Edwards Science and Technology School: Sun Peaks School: Rayleigh Elementary
- Website: www.sd73.bc.ca/nkss
- Last updated: May 2026

NorKam Secondary School is a public high school in Kamloops, British Columbia, Canada. It is a part of School District 73 Kamloops/Thompson. NorKam Secondary School includes grades 8–12.

At NorKam Secondary there are language programs: French, Spanish, Italian, Japanese, and English. The school offers the International Baccalaureate Diploma program. As well as trades academies program located in its newly built trades wing, where students can take either a carpentry or mechanics sampler for a semester. NorKam is also partnered with the local university, Thompson Rivers University to allow students to go to TRU for a semester with the TRUStart program. NorKam has a hairdressing course and a fully functioning industrial kitchen.

NorKam offers band and choir as well as drama, carpentry, and mechanics as some of their electives.

== Sports ==
The NorKam girls rugby team won the 2016 BC Provincial Tier 2 championship. The tournament was held in Kamloops from May 26–28, 2016.

== Bibliography ==
- Coleman, Peter; Love, Nancy (2004). Principal Portraits 2. Society for the Advancement of Excellence in Education (SAEE). ISBN 978-0-9734046-5-4.
