= The Bell Jar (upcoming film) =

- Directed by: Sarah Polley
- Screenplay by: Sarah Polley
- Based on: The Bell Jar by Sylvia Plath
- Produced by: Joy Gorman Wettels
- Starring: Billie Eilish; Carey Mulligan; Danielle Deadwyler; Lili Taylor; Ella Beatty; Ike Barinholtz; Connor Storrie
- Music by: Hildur Guðnadóttir
- Production companies: Plan B Entertainment; StudioCanal; Joy Coalition
- Distributed by: Focus Features
- Country: United States
- Language: English

The Bell Jar is an upcoming psychological drama film directed by Sarah Polley, who adapted it from the 1963 novel by Sylvia Plath.

== Cast ==
- Billie Eilish as Esther Greenwood
- Carey Mulligan as Mrs. Greenwood
- Danielle Deadwyler as Dr. Nolan
- Dylan Hawco as Buddy Willard
- Lili Taylor as Jay Cee
- Ella Beatty as Joan
- Maggie Kuntz as Doreen
- Ike Barinholtz as Lenny
- Connor Storrie as Marco

== Production ==
In July 2016, it was announced that Kirsten Dunst would make her directorial debut with a new film adaptation of The Bell Jar — the first since the 1970s — also co-writing the screenplay with Nellie Kim; Dakota Fanning would star. In October 2016, Jesse Plemons joined the cast. In November 2016, Patricia Arquette and Bel Powley joined the cast. However, the project failed to materialize with Dunst explaining in 2019: "I never had the rights. It was never mine. It was a script that was going around forever and with tons of people rewriting it. It just kept dragging on, and not getting financed, and I was like, ‘It’s too much work.’ I was in a phase of my life where I met Jesse [Plemons] and we were going to have a baby. I just wasn’t in the place anymore."

Years later, in March 2026, it was announced that Focus Features had acquired the rights with Sarah Polley writing and directing the adaptation; Billie Eilish would star. Filming began on June 29, 2026, in Toronto, Canada and was scheduled to film until September 2. In July 2026, Carey Mulligan was announced as part of the cast, and Ella Beatty was in final talks to join. Connor Storrie was cast in August. The rest of the cast was announced in a following month.

On August 3, set pictures of Eilish as Esther Greenwood were released, showing her in 1950s-style costumes and hairstyles on the set of the movie in Toronto. On September 8, production was confirmed to have wrapped.

=== Music ===
On October 13, Variety revealed that the musical score would be composed by Hildur Gudnadottir, who also praised Eilish, saying that “working with a fellow Oscar-winning musician like Eilish makes a huge difference” and that she understands the process that goes into writing music, so what you write can really resonate with her.
