= Ilya Rozanov =

Fictional character from Game Changers

- Game Changers character
- Ilya Rozanov as portrayed by Connor Storrie (2025)
- First appearance: Game Changer (2018)
- Created by: Rachel Reid
- Adapted by: Jacob Tierney
- Portrayed by: Connor Storrie

In-universe information
- Full name: Ilya Grigoryevich Rozanov
- Nickname: Roz
- Occupation: Ice hockey player
- Affiliation: In the novels: Boston Bears (2009–2018); Ottawa Centaurs (since 2018); In the series: Boston Raiders (since 2009)
- Family: Irina Rozanova (mother); Grigori Rozanov (father); Polina Rozanova (stepmother); In the novels: Andrei Rozanov (brother); In the series: Alexei Rozanov (brother); Unnamed niece
- Spouses: In the novels: Shane Hollander (m. 2021)
- Significant others: In the series: Shane Hollander (since 2017)
- Religion: Orthodox Christian
- Origin: Moscow, Russia
- Nationality: Russian

Ilya Grigoryevich Rozanov (Russian: Илья Григорьевич Розанов) is a fictional character in Rachel Reid's sports romance novel series Game Changers (2018–2022) and its television adaptation Heated Rivalry (2025–present). He appears in all six published novels, serving as a main character in Heated Rivalry (2019) and The Long Game (2022), the second and sixth installments of the series, and as a supporting character in the fifth installment, Role Model (2021). He is also set to be the main character in the upcoming seventh installment, Unrivaled (2027). In the novels, Ilya is portrayed as a Russian professional ice hockey player and captain of fictional National Hockey League teams, known for his abrasive on-ice persona and reputation as a playboy. Privately, he struggles with clinical depression and a difficult family situation, and conceals his bisexuality and relationship with his league rival, Shane Hollander.

In 2025, the novel series was adapted for television, with Jacob Tierney serving as director, writer, and executive producer for Crave. In the adaptation, Ilya is portrayed by American actor Connor Storrie and reimagined as the captain of a Boston-based team in a fictional professional hockey league, with the series expanding upon his background and life in Russia. Storrie received critical acclaim for his performance, particularly for his command of the Russian language and accent as a non-native speaker.

== Development and conception ==
Reid has stated that Ilya was conceived while she was writing Game Changer (2018), when she became interested in the idea of a storyline involving a star player secretly involved with an antagonistic Russian rival. In early drafts, the character who would become Ilya had a different name. The concept ultimately developed into Heated Rivalry. Reid told PinkNews that, "in the early drafts of Heated Rivalry, Ilya was much more of a jerk. I think he was much meaner ... And I think he was maybe more of a stereotypical bad boy, I guess. And then I softened him a bit as I went back and wrote more."

Reid drew inspiration from the real-life rivalry between Sidney Crosby and Alexander Ovechkin for the novel. In the novel's afterword, she credited HBO's reality television series 24/7, which had followed the 2011 NHL Winter Classic between Ovechkin's Washington Capitals and Crosby's Pittsburgh Penguins. She further cited Jaromír Jágr, Teemu Selänne, and Ilya Kovalchuk as inspirations for the character of Ilya. Additionally, she credited Mikhail Sergachev as the biggest influence on his speech patterns. However, she noted: "I never directly base my characters on any real people ... I was also inspired by other sports rivalries, by other fictional stories, and by my love of the enemies-to-lovers and forbidden romance tropes."

Furthermore, the rivalry between the fictional NHL teams of Shane Hollander and Ilya, the Montreal Voyageurs and the Boston Bears, respectively, is inspired by the real-life Bruins–Canadiens rivalry between the Montreal Canadiens and the Boston Bruins. Reid herself is a lifelong Canadiens fan, while her father is a Bruins fan.

== Fictional character biography ==
Ilya Grigoryevich Rozanov was born on 15 June 1991 in Moscow, in what were then the final months of the Soviet Union. His father, Grigori, was a police officer who worked at the Ministry of Internal Affairs. His mother, Irina, was in her 20s when she gave birth to Ilya, while Grigori was about 50. He was their second child, after his brother Andrei, who is four years older and is also a police officer.

Ilya's hockey position is centre. He was drafted first overall by the Boston Bears at the 2009 NHL entry draft. After joining the team, he helps them reach the 2012 Stanley Cup playoffs in his second NHL season, where they are eliminated by their rivals Montreal Voyageurs. He captains Russia at the 2014 Winter Olympics, although the team underperforms. He helps Boston win the 2014 Stanley Cup, and wins that year's MVP award, for which he was first nominated in 2012. In July 2018, he left the Boston Bears and signed with the Ottawa Centaurs. He helps the team reach the 2021 Stanley Cup playoffs after over a decade.

For much of his professional career, Ilya was at the center of a highly publicized rivalry with Canadian player Shane Hollander, which began during their junior careers and was already prominent by the 2009 World Junior Championships. It intensified shortly thereafter, when Ilya was drafted by Boston and Shane by their rivals Montreal. The rivalry continued until November 2018, when the two publicly announced their friendship, and effectively concluded in March 2021, when their romantic relationship became public.

=== Family history ===
Grigori was abusive toward Irina; Ilya stated that Grigori "hated her" and believed she had been cheating on him and planned to leave him. She was the only family member with whom Ilya was close. She supported his hockey career, and he enjoyed playing the sport for her. However, when Ilya was 12 years old (in 2003 or 2004), Irina, who had clinical depression, died by suicide from an overdose of medication, and Ilya found her body. The nature of her death remained secret, and Grigori unsuccessfully attempted to convince Ilya that it had been accidental. It remained a secret until November 2018, when Ilya publicly revealed it at a press conference about the founding of the Irina Foundation, aimed at raising money and awareness for suicide prevention organizations. Following Irina's death, Grigori married a younger woman named Polina. Grigori did not follow Ilya's NHL career, as he considered the league inferior to the Kontinental Hockey League. Ilya and Andrei did not maintain a close relationship; Andrei, as well as Polina, only contact Ilya to ask for money. As of July 2014, Andrei and Polina ignored Ilya's suspicions of Grigori's Alzheimer's disease. By January 2017, the disease had drastically progressed, and Grigori died in March 2017. During his battle with the disease, Ilya paid for his treatment. After Grigori's funeral, Ilya gifted his Moscow condo to Andrei, cut ties with his remaining family, and did not return to Russia thereafter.

=== Physical appearance and personality ===
Ilya has been described as physically attractive, and in October 2016 was listed fifth in Cosmopolitan's ranking of the "Hottest Men in the NHL". He is said to be 6 ft 3 in (1.91 m) tall, with golden skin, light brown curly hair, hazel eyes, and dark, thick eyebrows. He has a strong jaw and a cleft chin covered in stubble. His smile is described as lopsided and lazy, and his teeth as unnaturally white because most of them are not real. His nose is crooked from having been broken several times. He has a long neck, a muscular chest covered in dark brown hair, broad shoulders, a tapered waist, muscular buttocks, a dark brown happy trail, and thick thighs, and is uncircumcised. He has a snarling grizzly bear tattoo on his left pectoral muscle, which he obtained as a Russian Bear emblem before being drafted by the Boston Bears. In May 2020, he obtains a loon tattoo on his left arm near his shoulder. He also wears a golden crucifix pendant around his neck, which he never removes and which belonged to Irina.

Ilya is known for his abrasive on-ice persona and cockiness, and has been described as "flashy" and "loud". Despite this reputation, he is also portrayed as highly perceptive and humorous, and is noted for his rapport with children. He openly supports LGBTQ+ rights, even prior to publicly coming out, as well as mental health initiatives and various charitable causes. Although he has a reputation as a playboy, he is described as treating women with respect. Privately, Ilya fears inheriting Alzheimer's disease and clinical depression from his parents, and he is diagnosed with the latter in December 2020, after which he begins taking antidepressants at some point before October 2021. He expresses belief in God, although he no longer attends Divine Liturgy, and he also believes in souls and has vague ideas about the afterlife. He has been a smoker since his teenage years, and has been unable to quit despite multiple attempts. He previously owned a collection of European sports cars, most of which he had sold by the time he relocated from Boston to Ottawa.

=== Sexuality and relationships ===
Ilya lost his virginity at the age of 14. His early sexual encounters were exclusively with girls, and he later became aware of his attraction to boys as well. Despite growing up in a homophobic environment, he has always been secure in his bisexuality, which he describes as contributing to a sense of personal development, stating that being attracted to men as well as women made him feel "evolved". He treated sex, as well as hockey following Irina's death, as an escape from his harsh reality. One of his earliest experiences with men involved the son of one of his Russian coaches. At the age of 17, he slept with a teammate's girlfriend. At another point, he also slept with Andrei's girlfriend and a teammate's sister. Around 2014, Ilya met Svetlana Vetrova, who worked at a Lamborghini dealership in Boston. The daughter of Boston's Russian former star player Sergei Vetrov and an avid hockey fan, Svetlana became his friend with benefits. Until some time before November 2016, he also regularly slept with an unnamed woman from New York. Around January 2017, he slept with a woman named Hayley.

In July 2010, Ilya has his first sexual encounter with Shane, when they fellate each other. In February 2011, they engage in anal sex for the first time in a Montreal hotel room. These encounters initiate a years-long secret sexual arrangement during which Ilya develops romantic feelings for Shane. In January 2017, after the All-Star Game, Shane confesses his feelings to Ilya and indirectly expresses his desire for a committed relationship. In March 2017, while in Moscow for his father's funeral, Ilya confesses his love to Shane in Russian during a phone call, but Shane does not understand. Shane invites Ilya to his Ontario cottage, which Ilya accepts three months later. In July 2017, at the cottage, they confess their love and begin a committed relationship. A limited number of individuals are aware of their relationship: Shane's parents learn of it in July 2017, Shane's former girlfriend Rose Landry knows by November 2018, Shane's best friend and teammate Hayden Pike and his wife Jackie learn in November 2018, Ilya's former teammate Ryan Price learns in July 2019, Shane and Ilya's agent Farah Jalali and Price's boyfriend Fabian Salah are informed in July 2020, Ilya's psychologist Dr. Galina Molchalina is told in December 2020, Svetlana Vetrova in February 2021, and Ilya's teammate Troy Barrett in March 2021. In January 2021, Shane proposes to Ilya, who accepts. Two months later, their relationship becomes publicly known. In May 2021, they publicly announce their engagement, and they marry in July 2021.

Despite the longevity of their on-and-off relationship, Ilya and Shane maintain an active sexual relationship. This includes Shane performing a self-pleasuring display for Ilya to watch from an armchair, Ilya fellating Shane while he is on the phone with Hayden, Shane edging himself for Ilya via FaceTime, Shane driving from Montreal to Ottawa wearing a butt plug, Ilya forcing Shane to watch himself in the mirror during sex, Ilya fingering Shane while speaking with his friend Cliff Marlow through a closed door, and Ilya praising Shane during sex in Shane's trophy room. Within their sexual dynamic, Ilya is exclusively the top and Shane the bottom. Although they almost exclusively practice safe sex by November 2018, by October 2020 they rarely do so. They nevertheless remain sexually exclusive. Shane maintains a strict rule against threesomes, and a suggestion by Ilya that they open their relationship to allow Shane additional experiences with men results in a dispute during which they do not speak for three days.

== In the novels ==
=== Game Changer ===
Ilya Rozanov is first introduced in Game Changer (2018) ahead of the New York Admirals' game against his team, the Boston Bears. He is described as Boston's "star center". During the game, the novel's protagonist, Scott Hunter, receives a five-minute penalty for roughing after punching Rozanov in the face. Rozanov later reappears during the 2017 Stanley Cup playoffs, where he continues to antagonize Hunter.

After Hunter comes out as gay to his teammates Eric Bennett, Carter Vaughn and Greg Huff and reveals his secret relationship with the barista Kip Grady, Huff remarks that he had assumed Hunter was dating Rozanov. The Admirals' coach, Harv Murdock, similarly asks Hunter whether he dated Rozanov after Hunter later comes out to him.

Following Hunter's public coming out, during which he kisses Kip on the ice after winning the 2017 Stanley Cup, Rozanov appears at a Vegas gay bar hosting a "Scott Hunter Night" after the 2017 NHL Awards. He praises Hunter's decision, stating that what he did was "good" and would "be good for... others."

=== Heated Rivalry ===
In Heated Rivalry (2019), Ilya serves as a co-protagonist alongside Shane. The two first meet on 23 December 2008 during the 2009 World Junior Ice Hockey Championships in Regina, Saskatchewan, where Ilya's Team Russia defeats Shane's Team Canada in the final, and Ilya becomes aware of his attraction to Shane. At the 2009 NHL entry draft, Ilya is drafted first overall by the Boston Bears, while Shane is selected second overall by the Montreal Voyageurs. The following year, they again compete internationally at the World Junior Championships. In July 2010, after filming a commercial for CCM, they begin a recurring secret sexual arrangement. Early in their professional careers, Ilya struggles with English and media scrutiny while competing directly with Shane in the NHL. At the 2011 NHL All-Star Game, the league promotes their rivalry, and the two continue their clandestine encounters while concealing their involvement from others. After Shane defeats Ilya for the Rookie of the Year award, Ilya returns to Russia during the off-season despite his reluctance to do so. Two years later, Ilya has improved his English and become Boston's alternate captain, and he and Shane continue meeting in secret while avoiding emotional commitment. At the 2014 Winter Olympics in Sochi, Russia's poor performance leads to a confrontation with his father, Grigori, who berates him and asks whether Ilya's mother tied his bow tie, prompting Ilya to remind him that she is dead, foreshadowing Grigori's later cognitive decline.

After winning the 2014 Stanley Cup and later the MVP award, Ilya experiences a panic attack while preparing to meet Shane again at the NHL Awards and remains reluctant to discuss his family, while privately worrying about his father's deteriorating health. By October 2016, Ilya faces homophobic harassment during games and becomes increasingly aware of the depth of his feelings for Shane. Their encounters grow more emotionally complex, and Ilya struggles with jealousy when Shane publicly dates actress Rose Landry, whose relationship with Shane later ends. At the 2017 NHL All-Star Game, Shane comes out to Ilya as gay and confesses his romantic feelings, while Ilya expresses concern that a public partnership would prevent him from returning to Russia and shares details about his family and late mother. Their growing attachment is complicated by Grigori's illness and death. While in Moscow for the funeral, Ilya confesses his love for Shane during a phone call, speaking in Russian, which Shane cannot understand, and expresses a desire to eventually live outside Russia. After returning to North America, Ilya becomes increasingly conflicted about continuing their arrangement.

When Shane is seriously injured during a game, Ilya visits him in hospital and postpones plans to end their involvement. Following Boston's elimination from the playoffs, Ilya watches as Scott Hunter celebrates winning the 2017 Stanley Cup by kissing Kip on the ice during a live broadcast, prompting him to accept Shane's invitation to visit his cottage. At Shane's cottage in July 2017, the two confront the depth of their feelings and agree to greater honesty. Ilya reveals that his mother died by suicide and describes his difficult family history. He considers joining a Canadian team after his Boston contract expires in order to live closer to Shane. The two confess their love and discuss a shared future, including plans for Ilya to move to Canada, pursue citizenship, and establish a joint charitable initiative. Shane later comes out to his parents and introduces Ilya as his partner, and Ilya reassures him during a panic attack, affirming their commitment to a long-term future together. The epilogue takes place sixteen months later, in November 2018. Ilya has moved to Ottawa, and Shane has come out to his teammates at the beginning of the season. The two maintain the public appearance of friendship while privately continuing their partnership and planning the Irina Foundation, named after Ilya's mother. At a press conference announcing the foundation, Ilya departs from prepared remarks and publicly states that it is dedicated to his mother, who experienced depression prior to her suicide, and Shane supports him backstage.

=== Tough Guy ===
Ilya Rozanov appears in Tough Guy (2020), the third installment of the series, set during the 2018–19 NHL season. During a game between the Toronto Guardians and the Ottawa Centaurs, he starts a brawl with Toronto centre Dallas Kent, which Ryan Price, Rozanov's former teammate in Boston during the 2013–14 season, helps break up. Price also observes the public's surprise at Rozanov's move to Ottawa.

Later, Rozanov appears in a joint press conference with Shane Hollander, which Price's Toronto teammates watch with surprise due to the pair's public reputation as rivals; Kent and teammate Troy Barrett make homophobic remarks. In December 2018, Toronto goaltender Wyatt Hayes joins Ottawa and refers to Rozanov's close but unexplained association with Hollander.

The following month, Rozanov meets Price at the funeral of Duncan Harvey, who died by suicide, for which he had skipped the 2019 NHL All-Star Game. Although he did not know Harvey personally, Rozanov explains that suicide is a personal issue for him and speaks about the lack of discussion of mental health in hockey. He invites Price to assist with the Irina Foundation's summer hockey camps and encourages him to pursue what makes him happy, acknowledging Price's struggles with anxiety and dissatisfaction with the sport.

In the epilogue, during the first day of the Irina Foundation camps, Price witnesses Rozanov and Hollander kissing and agrees to keep their secret.

=== Common Goal ===
Ilya Rozanov appears in Common Goal (2020), the fourth installment of the series, set during the 2019–20 NHL season. In November 2019, he discusses Scott Hunter and Kip Grady's engagement with the novel's protagonist Eric Bennett during a game between Ottawa and New York, and mocks Bennett for his age. After the game, Rozanov joins Hunter and Bennett at the gay bar Kingfisher, unintentionally disrupting Bennett's plan to come out to Hunter as bisexual. At the bar, bartender Kyle Swift, Kip's friend and Bennett's romantic interest, expresses his intention to flirt with Rozanov. Rozanov comments on Bennett's divorce from his wife Holly, notices the mutual attraction between Bennett and Kyle, and perceives Bennett's intention to retire at the end of the season, which he confirms with him and keeps confidential. That same night, Rozanov invites Hunter to coach at the Irina Foundation camps. In December 2019, he is mentioned in a conversation between Bennett and Hunter, who praise his philanthropy.

The following month, at the 2020 NHL All-Star Game, Bennett observes Rozanov's closeness with Shane Hollander. After the skills competition, Rozanov invites Bennett to coach at the Irina Foundation camps, and Bennett comes out to him.

=== Role Model ===
Ilya Rozanov appears in Role Model (2021), the fifth installment of the series, set during the 2020–21 NHL season, as a supporting character and teammate of protagonist Troy Barrett. In November 2020, Rozanov, the Ottawa captain, coldly welcomes Barrett after he is traded from Toronto due to his past friendship with Dallas Kent, who faced multiple rape allegations. It is revealed that Rozanov frequently posts photographs of random objects on his social media accounts.

Before a game in Vancouver, Rozanov reprimands Barrett for getting drunk the previous night and informs him that his father is waiting in the hotel lobby, adding that fathers "can be hard". During a game against Edmonton, he defends Barrett from an opposing player who verbally attacks Barrett for ending his friendship with Kent. After the game, Rozanov consoles Barrett when his first goal for Ottawa is disallowed; during their conversation, Barrett notices Rozanov's recently acquired loon tattoo. Barrett also reflects on his attraction to men while observing Rozanov in the locker room and expresses surprise at Rozanov's 2018 move to Ottawa. Later that month, Ottawa's social media manager Harris Drover reveals that Rozanov is never available on his days off.

In December 2020, ahead of a game in Toronto, Rozanov reassures Barrett, who is anxious about facing his former team. During the game, Kent makes homophobic remarks about Barrett, Shane Hollander, and Rozanov, prompting Rozanov to assault him and receive a game misconduct. Days later, Rozanov takes Barrett to the Kingfisher; the same night, Barrett comes out to Rozanov as gay, and Rozanov comes out to him as bisexual. When Barrett references Rozanov's closeness with Shane Hollander, Rozanov refuses to discuss the matter. Later that month, Rozanov leaves a Christmas photoshoot to give Barrett privacy with Harris, encouraging their growing relationship.

In January 2021, while Ottawa's team plane experiences an engine failure during a flight from Raleigh to Tampa Bay, Rozanov is shown frantically typing on his phone. After landing, he encourages Barrett to pursue a relationship with Harris and later appears aware of their intimacy. Rozanov subsequently misses the team's first practice after returning from Florida but later delivers a motivational speech that sparks Ottawa's winning streak. During a victory over Montreal, he engages in a brawl with Hollander and his teammate Hayden Pike, later explaining to Barrett that their hostility is limited to on-ice rivalry and that they are friends off the ice.

When Barrett reveals that NHL commissioner Roger Crowell had warned him to stop posting sexual assault infographics on Instagram, Rozanov states he will confront Crowell at the upcoming NHL All-Star Game. He continues to support Barrett by encouraging his relationship with Harris and helps Barrett come out to the team by silencing the locker room. Later, when Barrett publicly comes out online before the Pride Night game against Toronto, Rozanov supports him; when Barrett says that the public support he is receiving also applies to Rozanov, Rozanov replies that fans may soon become aware of that.

=== The Long Game ===
In The Long Game (2022), Ilya Rozanov and Shane Hollander reassume the roles of protagonists. The novel is set during the 2020–21 NHL season and its timeline mostly overlaps with Role Model. In July 2020, Ilya and Shane reveal their relationship to their agent Farah Jalali while continuing to conceal it from the public. During that year's Irina Foundation camps, Ilya experiences recurring nightmares about his mother Irina and displays jealousy over Shane's public interactions, reflecting growing emotional instability. The same period also shows the couple navigating public appearances and private tensions while maintaining secrecy about their relationship. As the season begins, Ilya's mental health deteriorates as his depression resurfaces and he struggles with the strain of hiding his relationship with Shane. He withdraws from team activities and experiences insecurity about his captaincy.

After Montreal plays Ottawa, he sustains a knee injury and expresses frustration to Shane about their enforced secrecy, highlighting ongoing miscommunication between them. His emotional distress culminates at a Halloween party, where he feels isolated by his inability to acknowledge their relationship and subsequently decides to seek professional help. In early November 2020, Ilya begins psychotherapy with Dr. Galina Molchalina, a Russian-speaking psychologist in Ottawa, and gradually opens up about his childhood, his mother Irina, and his personal struggles, initially concealing the treatment from Shane. Meanwhile, external pressures intensify when NHL commissioner Roger Crowell warns Shane against publicly coming out. Ilya continues therapy while discussing his past and the complexities of his secret relationship. During this period, he develops a closer friendship with teammate Troy Barrett and becomes more attentive to Barrett, while also confronting his own fears regarding mental health. After a period of separation, Ilya and Shane briefly reunite.

In December 2020, Ilya's therapy sessions focus on the changes he has made for Shane and the emotional burden of secrecy. Ongoing conflict over their hidden relationship leads to a major argument on Boxing Day, after which Ilya is diagnosed with clinical depression; he later reconciles with Shane after disclosing his therapy and emotional struggles. In January 2021, a near-fatal engine failure on Ottawa's team plane prompts Ilya, believing he may die, to send farewell messages to Shane and confront his feelings about their relationship. Shortly after returning from Florida, Shane proposes to him, and Ilya accepts, with the couple agreeing to make their relationship public the following summer. Ilya continues therapy while adjusting to the engagement and ongoing pressures of secrecy. At the NHL All-Star Game, Ilya confronts Crowell regarding his treatment of Shane and Barrett. As the season progresses, he supports Barrett's coming out while struggling with conflicting feelings about his own concealed relationship. Following a Pride Night game, Shane consoles Ilya at his home, where they have sex and discuss their relationship.

In March 2021, Ilya and Shane's relationship is accidentally exposed when a video captures them kissing, leading to league backlash and an ultimatum from Crowell to deny their relationship and cancel their planned wedding. They refuse and publicly confirm their relationship. They have sex in the trophy room at Shane's home, during which Ilya reminds Shane that Shane is the best player in the NHL. During the Stanley Cup playoffs, Ottawa eliminates Montreal after Ilya scores the decisive goal, leading to public scrutiny when Shane is accused of deliberately tripping during the play. After Ottawa's elimination from the playoffs, Ilya fully reveals his mental health struggles to Shane, who pledges to support him. In May 2021, Ilya and Shane publicly announce their engagement, and in July they marry in Ilya's backyard in Ottawa. The novel concludes with them beginning a new season as teammates as Ottawa aims to win the Stanley Cup with both players on the roster.

=== Unrivaled ===
Ilya is set to appear in Unrivaled (2027), the seventh installment of the series, once again as a central protagonist. Now publicly out and married to Shane, he navigates the challenges of playing on the same professional team as his husband while confronting renewed backlash within the hockey world following their relationship's public revelation.

== On television ==
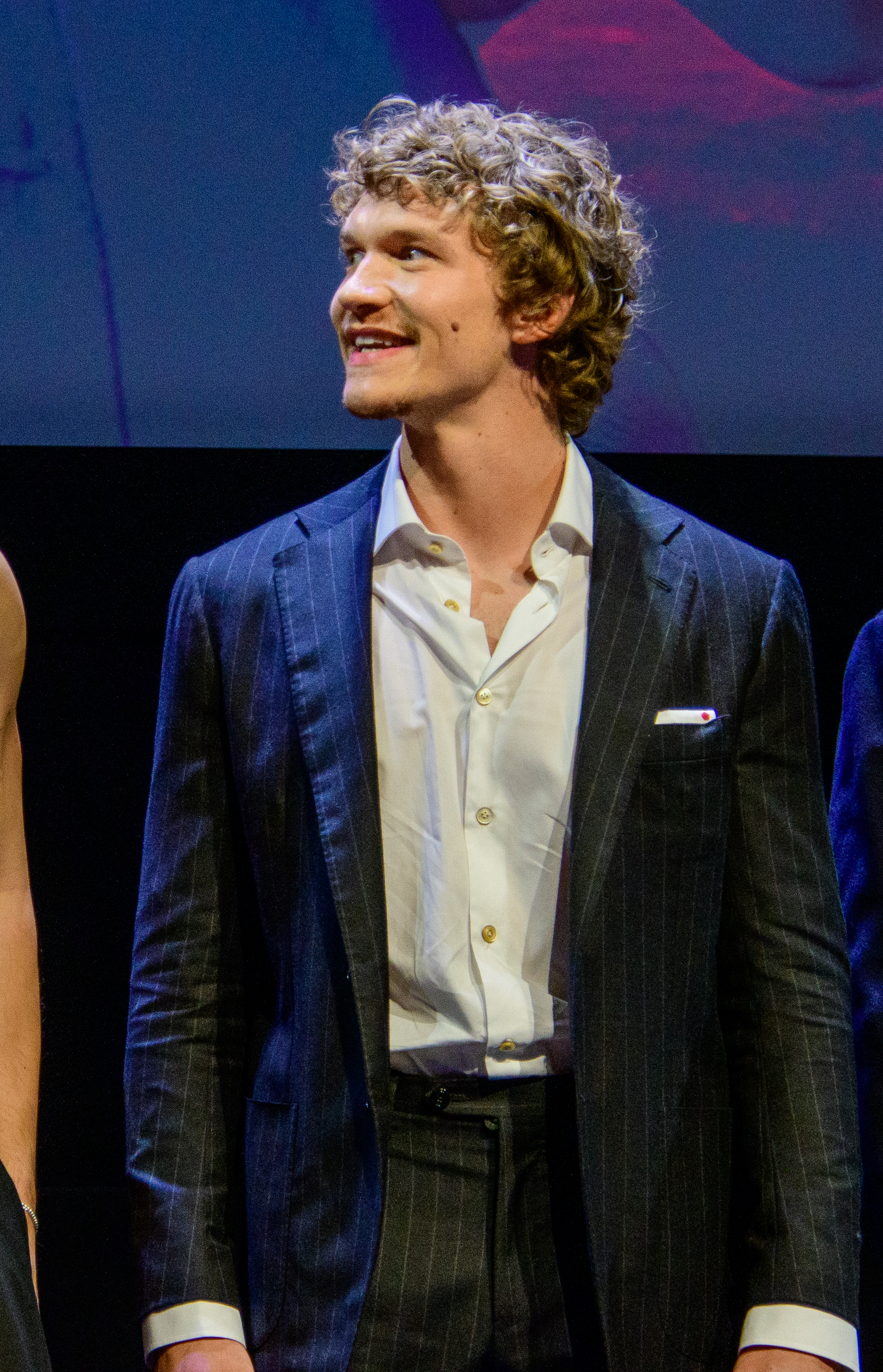
Connor Storrie (pictured in November 2025) portrays Ilya Rozanov in the television series Heated Rivalry

In Heated Rivalry (2025–present), a television adaptation of the Game Changers series directed, written, and executively produced by Jacob Tierney for the Canadian streaming service Crave, Ilya is portrayed by American actor Connor Storrie. Storrie's casting was announced on 5 June 2025.

Ilya's physical depiction differs from that of the novels. The height difference between Ilya and Shane, and Ilya's bear tattoo, are omitted, his eyes are portrayed as blue rather than hazel, and his hair appears light brown or dark blond. Additionally, he is depicted wearing a Russian Orthodox cross necklace rather than a crucifix.

Storrie's performance, particularly his command of the Russian language and accent, received critical attention and acclaim. He reportedly maintained the accent between takes; on Late Night with Seth Meyers, he stated that this led several Russian extras to believe he was a native Russian speaker or a second-generation Russian immigrant. The portrayal of Ilya earned Storrie a nomination for Individual Achievement in Drama at the 42nd TCA Awards.

=== Season one ===
The first season adapts the first two novels in the Game Changers series, Game Changer (2018) and Heated Rivalry (2019), and follows their narrative closely. Ilya is drafted by the Major League Hockey (MLH) team Boston Raiders in 2009 and begins a secret sexual involvement with Shane Hollander (Hudson Williams) the following year, when they shoot a commercial together. However, unlike in the novel, shooting it together was Ilya's idea, not the brand's. After a Montreal Metros versus Boston Raiders game is cancelled due to a snowstorm in February 2011, their plans to have anal sex for the first time are interrupted. They subsequently engage in sexting for two years until late 2013, when Shane hosts Ilya at his apartment and they have sex for the first time.

Ilya's connection with Svetlana Vetrova (Ksenia Daniela Kharlamova) is substantially reconfigured. Rather than a friend he meets in Boston, she is depicted as his childhood friend who appears aware of his bisexuality; they nevertheless remain friends with benefits. Her father, former Soviet goaltender Sergei Vetrov, and Grigori's superior, the Minister of Internal Affairs, are merged into a single character (Vitali Makarov). Unlike in the novels, his coach's son, named Sasha (Kaden Connors) in the adaptation, appears and unsuccessfully attempts to seduce Ilya.

The series also gives greater prominence to Ilya's brother, renamed Alexei (Slavic Rogozine). Alexei repeatedly asks Ilya for money, calls him a педик (Russian for 'faggot'), and is portrayed as neglectful toward Grigori (Yaroslav Poverlo) during his struggle with Alzheimer's disease. At Grigori's funeral, Ilya and Alexei engage in a physical confrontation, after which Ilya cuts ties with him while establishing a fund for Alexei's daughter, accessible when she turns 18.

== Reception ==
Since the premiere of the television adaptation in November 2025, the character of Ilya Rozanov has been described as a queer icon in Russia. Mikhail Zygar wrote for Vanity Fair: "Heated Rivalry resonates so strongly with me, a gay man from Russia, because Connor Storrie's Ilya does not look like an alien or a caricatured Russian gangster in a fur ushanka—the kind of Russian you commonly find in Hollywood films. He is simply a human being—traumatized by a difficult childhood, yes, and trying to hide behind rough jokes, but ultimately just as frightened as his boyfriend, Shane, who grew up in Canada. There are no exotic balalaikas, no mysterious Russian soul, no Putin, no Dostoevsky—just an ordinary person, alive and vulnerable." Zygar further compared Ilya's journey toward emotional openness and freedom with the lived experiences of gay people in Russia, arguing that the series' hopeful portrayal contrasts with the fear and social exclusion faced by LGBTQ community there. Russian fans themselves have also expressed a strong personal connection to Ilya's storyline, especially his fear that coming out would prevent him from returning to Russia. In an interview with CBC News, they cited the character's struggle as reflective of the country's increasingly severe anti-LGBTQ+ climate.

Eloïse Thompson of Novaya Gazeta Europe wrote: "Rozanov is not just a Russian man, but a queer Russian man, and this is what sets him apart from other 'stereotypical' Russian characters portrayed in foreign cinema." She quoted an anonymous fan, who explained "in Russia, where the question of LGBTQ+ rights and their acceptance in society is truly complex, the emergence of characters like Ilya constitutes an important cultural phenomenon." According to cultural commentator Andrey Sapozhnikov, Heated Rivalry is "set in the late 2000s, which in the context of recent Russian history is a period of relative timelessness and freedom from political associations. Rozanov is no longer a Soviet hockey player of the Cold War era... but also not a 'post-Crimea' native of a country defined by triumphant revanchism." Sapozhnikov further highlighted that Heated Rivalry hasn't managed to avoid stereotypes entirely, as Ilya's character reproduces well-established clichés, in which "Russianness is entirely synonymous with reticence, severity, and a refusal to follow the rules."

Harry Stewart of Out felt that the television adaptation's version of Ilya was superior to the novel series' version of Ilya, writing: "Ilya's dominance and masculinity in the books isn't a focal point in the show. Instead, we see more of him as a vulnerable bisexual man who fights against his emotions and his family, but just wants to be held in the arms of a person that he loves. ... Ilya's character is softened, and portrayed as a kinder masculinity. In the book, when they both say 'I love you,' Ilya is stoic and 'scared'. In the show he cries, happily." Ekta Sinha of Elle India pointed out that Ilya, "the supposed playboy, is allowed tenderness." She praised the equality between him and Shane, writing: "Two hyper-masculine athletes playing a hyper-masculine sport reveal emotional vulnerability without surrendering their masculinity. That dismantling matters."

For Gay Times, Tom George linked the surge in "dom tops" on gay dating apps to the character of Ilya, alongside the roles of Alexander Skarsgård and Matt Bomer in Pillion (2025) and Fellow Travelers (2023), respectively: "It's expected that with the increase of queer non-traditional sex in media, more people are likely to explore alternate forms of intimacy with differing levels of success. Some of these dom tops are here to stay and will learn with experience; others will move on to the next fantasy." Writing for The Advocate, Michael Dru Kelley argued that the character of Ilya serves as a cultural breakthrough, particularly for closeted or uncertain bisexual men, by depicting a hyper-masculine elite athlete whose storyline may encourage them to explore and embrace their identity.

== In popular culture ==
The 17 January 2026 episode of Saturday Night Live featured a sketch titled "Heated Wizardry", parodying Heated Rivalry and the Harry Potter film series. The sketch starred host Finn Wolfhard as a character combining Shane Hollander and Harry Potter, opposite Ben Marshall as a character combining Ilya Rozanov and Ron Weasley, within a storyline that merged elements from both series.

In September 2026, Carly Rae Jepsen revealed to The Hollywood Reporter that she named her son Ilya after the character.

== Bibliography ==
- Reid, Rachel (2018). Game Changer. Carina Press. ISBN 9781488038679.
- Reid, Rachel (2019a). Heated Rivalry. Carina Press. ISBN 9781488051241.
- Reid, Rachel (2020a). Tough Guy. Carina Press. ISBN 9781488068911.
- Reid, Rachel (2020b). Common Goal. Carina Press. ISBN 9781488076855.
- Reid, Rachel (2021a). Role Model. Carina Press. ISBN 9781488076985.
- Reid, Rachel (2022). The Long Game. Carina Press. ISBN 9780369704436.
