= Shane Hollander =

Fictional character from Game Changers

- Game Changers character
- Shane Hollander as portrayed by Hudson Williams (2025)
- First appearance: Heated Rivalry (2019)
- Created by: Rachel Reid
- Adapted by: Jacob Tierney
- Portrayed by: Hudson Williams

In-universe information
- Full name: Shane Hollander
- Occupation: Ice hockey player
- Affiliation: In the novels: Montreal Voyageurs (2009–2021); Ottawa Centaurs (since 2021); In the series: Montreal Metros (since 2009)
- Family: Yuna Hollander (mother); David Hollander (father)
- Spouses: In the novels: Ilya Rozanov (m. 2021)
- Significant others: Rose Landry (2016–2017); In the novels: Unnamed girlfriend (until 2009); In the series: Ilya Rozanov (since 2017)
- Origin: Ottawa, Ontario, Canada
- Nationality: Canadian

Shane Hollander is a fictional character from Rachel Reid's sports romance novel series Game Changers (2018–2022) and its television adaptation Heated Rivalry (2025–present). He appears in five of the six published novels, serving as a main character in Heated Rivalry (2019) and The Long Game (2022), the second and sixth installments of the series. He is also set to be the main character in the upcoming seventh installment, Unrivaled (2027). In the novels, Shane is a Canadian professional ice hockey player and the captain of a fictional National Hockey League team, whose private life is marked by his struggle to reconcile his homosexuality with his public career, including a secret relationship with his league rival, Ilya Rozanov.

In 2025, the novel series was adapted for television, with Jacob Tierney serving as director, writer, and executive producer for Crave. In the adaptation, Shane is portrayed by Canadian actor Hudson Williams and is reimagined as the captain of a Montreal-based team in a fictional professional hockey league. The television version places greater emphasis on the character's mixed Asian Canadian ancestry and undiagnosed autism. Williams received critical acclaim for his performance with praise being aimed at his portrayal of autism.

== Development and conception ==
Reid has stated that Shane was conceived shortly before she began writing Heated Rivalry. While working on Game Changer (2018), the novel series' first installment, she became interested in a storyline involving a star player secretly involved with an antagonistic Russian rival, which led to the development of the novel and the creation of Shane. Reid drew inspiration from the real-life rivalry between Sidney Crosby and Alexander Ovechkin for Heated Rivalry. In the novel's afterword, she credited HBO's reality television series 24/7, which had followed the 2011 NHL Winter Classic between Ovechkin's Washington Capitals and Crosby's Pittsburgh Penguins. She further cited Wayne Gretzky, Paul Kariya and John Tavares for the character of Shane. However, she noted: "I never directly base my characters on any real people ... I was also inspired by other sports rivalries, by other fictional stories, and by my love of the enemies-to-lovers and forbidden romance tropes." According to Reid, Shane has the series' hero's arc and is her favourite character to write, particularly from his perspective.

Furthermore, the rivalry between the fictional NHL teams of Ilya Rozanov and Shane, the Boston Bears and the Montreal Voyageurs, respectively, is inspired by the real-life Bruins–Canadiens rivalry between the Montreal Canadiens and the Boston Bruins. Reid herself is a lifelong Canadiens fan, while her father is a Bruins fan.

Reid has stated that Shane is on the autism spectrum. Although the character was not initially conceived as autistic, she later incorporated this aspect into his portrayal in The Long Game following her experience of having her oldest child, whom she has described as neurodivergent, diagnosed. She added that Shane may never become aware of being autistic. She has also said that she does not consider Heated Rivalry an "excellent representation of an Asian-Canadian person", responding to readers' criticism that Shane's Japanese background was insufficiently developed and that the character could otherwise be interpreted as fully white. She added that she wanted to be mindful of such concerns going forward and ensure she was not "veering into any kind of stereotypes." Some readers have also interpreted Shane's strict performance-focused diet in The Long Game as indicative of disordered eating, though this reading is not presented explicitly in the text.

== Fictional character biography ==
Shane Hollander was born on 10 May 1991 in Ottawa. His mother, Yuna, is a second-generation Japanese immigrant born and raised in Montreal; she worked for the Bank of Canada until 2018. His father, David, is of unspecified Anglo-European heritage; he works for the Treasury Board of Canada and previously played hockey for McGill University. Shane is the only child of Yuna and David, who were unable to have additional children. Shane is bilingual, as he is also fluent in French.

Shane played junior hockey in Kingston, and his playing position is centre. He was drafted second overall by the Montreal Voyageurs at the 2009 NHL entry draft. After joining the team, he helps them reach the 2012 Stanley Cup playoffs in his second NHL season, and he contributed to their victories in the 2015, 2016 and 2020 Stanley Cups. He also received the Rookie of the Year award in 2011 and the Conn Smythe Trophy in 2020, and was first nominated for the MVP award in 2012. At the 2014 Winter Olympics, he helps Canada win the silver medal. He is widely regarded as the best player in the National Hockey League (NHL). By October 2020, he had scored over 500 goals in the NHL. In July 2021, he left the Montreal Voyageurs and signed with his hometown team, the Ottawa Centaurs.

For much of his professional career, Shane was at the centre of a highly publicized rivalry with Russian player Ilya Rozanov, which began during their junior careers and was already prominent by the 2009 World Junior Championships. It intensified shortly thereafter, when Shane was drafted by Montreal and Ilya by the rival Boston Bears. The rivalry continued until November 2018, when the two publicly announced their friendship, and effectively concluded in March 2021, when their romantic relationship became public.

=== Physical appearance and personality ===
Shane has been described as physically attractive, and in October 2016 was named the "Hottest Man in the NHL" by Cosmopolitan. He is said to be 5 ft 10 in (1.78 m) tall and 200 lb (91 kg) in weight, with jet-black hair, dark eyes, and long lashes. His skin is tanned and described as smooth and flawless, with a smattering of dark freckles across his nose and cheekbones, as well as on the back of his neck. He has a sharp jaw and a small, straight-sloped nose. Since 2017, he has worn glasses with thick black frames for reading. Following the 2020 Stanley Cup playoffs, he grew out his hair, which he often ties in a bun. He is muscular, with large biceps, thighs, and buttocks. He is circumcised, his chest, belly, and testicles are described as naturally hairless, and he is said to be unable to grow a playoff beard.

Shane is frequently teased for being a stereotypically boring Canadian. He is characterised by routine and discipline, and is described as "buttoned-up and serious", "uptight", "anxious", and "focused", earning the nickname "Canada's golden boy". According to Reid, Shane does not carry trauma or grief. He frequently drinks ginger ale, which has become his trademark beverage. Shane is deeply committed to his hockey career and treats it as his foremost priority. He practices yoga and meditation, and in February 2020, a year before his 30th birthday, he adopts a strict performance diet in an effort to prolong his NHL career.

=== Sexuality and relationships ===
As of June 2009, Shane is in an unhappy relationship with an unnamed girlfriend. By December of that year, they have broken up and he has hooked up with two women since, while also noticing an increasing attraction to men. On the night of the 2009 NHL draft, he first becomes aware of his attraction to Ilya Rozanov. In January 2014, he has an unpleasant sexual encounter with a woman named Olivia or Ophelia. His apparent reluctance to settle down leads his friends to repeatedly attempt to set him up with other partners. In November 2016, Ilya questions him about his experiences with women, prompting Shane to further explore his sexuality. Later that month, he begins dating American actress Rose Landry. After they have sex twice, Rose questions Shane about his sexuality in January 2017, marking the first time he admits his attraction to men to another person; they separate amicably. Rose remains a close friend and supports him in navigating his sexuality. That same month, following the NHL All-Star Game, Shane comes out to Ilya as gay. In July 2017, he comes out to his parents, who state they had already suspected it. He comes out to his Montreal teammates in October 2018. By December 2019, most of the NHL is aware of his sexuality, as he does not object to others knowing but avoids a public announcement. However, by July 2020, he is depicted as still struggling with his sexuality.

In July 2010, Shane has his first sexual experience with a man when he and Ilya hook up for the first time, fellating each other. In February 2011, they engage in anal sex for the first time in a Montreal hotel room. These encounters initiate a years-long secret sexual arrangement during which Shane develops romantic feelings for Ilya. During these years, Shane has another two sexual encounters with men in Mexico and Los Angeles, respectively. In January 2017, after the All-Star Game, Shane confesses his feelings to Ilya and indirectly expresses his desire for a committed relationship. In March 2017, he invites Ilya to his Ontario cottage, which Ilya accepts three months later. In July 2017, at the cottage, they confess their love and begin a committed relationship. A limited number of individuals are aware of their relationship: Shane's parents learn of it in July 2017, Rose Landry knows by November 2018, Shane's best friend and teammate Hayden Pike and his wife Jackie learn in November 2018, Ilya's former teammate Ryan Price learns in July 2019, Shane and Ilya's agent Farah Jalali and Price's boyfriend Fabian Salah are informed in July 2020, Ilya's psychologist Dr. Galina Molchalina is told in December 2020, Ilya's friend Svetlana Vetrova in February 2021, and Ilya's teammate Troy Barrett in March 2021. In January 2021, Shane proposes to Ilya, who accepts. Two months later, their relationship becomes publicly known. In May 2021, they publicly announce their engagement, and they marry in July 2021.

Despite the longevity of their on-and-off relationship, Shane and Ilya maintain an active sexual relationship. This includes Shane performing a self-pleasuring display for Ilya to watch from an armchair, Ilya fellating Shane while he is on the phone with Hayden, Shane edging himself for Ilya via FaceTime, Shane driving from Montreal to Ottawa wearing a butt plug, Ilya forcing Shane to watch himself in the mirror during sex, Ilya fingering Shane while speaking with his friend Cliff Marlow through a closed door, and Ilya praising Shane during sex in Shane's trophy room. Within their sexual dynamic, Shane is exclusively the bottom and Ilya the top. Although they almost exclusively practice safe sex by November 2018, by October 2020 they rarely do so. They nevertheless remain sexually exclusive. Shane maintains a strict rule against threesomes, and a suggestion by Ilya that they open their relationship to allow Shane additional experiences with men results in a dispute during which they do not speak for three days.

== In the novels ==
=== Heated Rivalry ===
Shane Hollander is first introduced in Heated Rivalry (2019), where he serves as a co-protagonist alongside Ilya Rozanov. The two first meet on 23 December 2008 during the 2009 World Junior Ice Hockey Championships in Regina, Saskatchewan, where Shane's Team Canada is defeated by Ilya's Team Russia in the final. At the 2009 NHL entry draft, Shane is selected second overall by the Montreal Voyageurs, immediately after Ilya is drafted first overall by the Boston Bears, and becomes aware of his attraction to Ilya during a post-draft workout. The following year, they again compete at the World Junior Championships. In July 2010, after filming a commercial for CCM, they begin a recurring secret sexual arrangement, marking Shane's first sexual experience with another man. During their early NHL careers, Shane competes directly with Ilya amid intense media attention surrounding their rivalry. At the 2011 NHL All-Star Game, the league promotes their rivalry, and the two continue their clandestine encounters while concealing their involvement from others. After winning the Rookie of the Year award over Ilya, Shane is kissed by him shortly before Ilya's return to Russia for the off-season. Two years later, Shane continues meeting Ilya privately while attempting to discuss the future of their involvement, which Ilya avoids. At the 2014 Winter Olympics in Sochi, conversations about Russia's anti-LGBTQ laws heighten Shane's concern for Ilya, who rebuffs his attempts to speak with him.

After Ilya wins the 2014 Stanley Cup and later the MVP award, the two reunite at the NHL Awards; afterward, Shane realizes he regrets not kissing Ilya, prompting him to acknowledge that his feelings for him are deepening despite his attempts to deny them. By 2016, Shane has become Montreal's captain and a two-time Stanley Cup champion. He reflects on his dissatisfaction with past relationships with women and grows unsettled by increasing emotional intimacy with Ilya. He briefly dates actress Rose Landry but acknowledges having been involved with men, and they end their romantic involvement amicably. At the 2017 NHL All-Star Game, Shane comes out to Ilya as gay and confesses his romantic feelings, while Ilya expresses concern that a public partnership would prevent him from returning to Russia. Shane becomes increasingly concerned for Ilya during his father's illness and death. During phone calls while Ilya is in Moscow for the funeral, Shane encourages him to speak in Russian to express his grief and recognizes his own desire for a committed future with him. The two continue communicating frequently and engage in emotionally intimate exchanges while maintaining secrecy.

In April 2017, Shane is seriously injured during a game against Boston and is ruled out of the Stanley Cup playoffs. During his recovery, he invites Ilya to visit his cottage again, after doing so previously via phone while Ilya was in Moscow. While recovering, he considers coming out to his parents. After witnessing Scott Hunter celebrate winning the 2017 Stanley Cup by kissing his partner on the ice during a live broadcast, Shane receives a call from Ilya accepting his invitation. At his cottage in July 2017, Shane and Ilya agree to greater honesty and acknowledge their feelings for one another. Shane learns about Ilya's difficult family history, including his mother Irina's suicide. When Ilya considers moving to a Canadian team, Shane proposes a plan for them to live closer together, establish a charitable initiative, and pursue a shared future after retirement; they confess their love and discuss long-term plans. After being caught by his father during an intimate moment with Ilya, Shane comes out to his parents and introduces Ilya to them as his partner, and during a panic attack about the rapid changes in his life, he is comforted by Ilya, after which they affirm their commitment to one another. The epilogue takes place sixteen months later, in November 2018. Shane has come out to his teammates at the beginning of the season, while he and Ilya maintain the public appearance of friendship and privately continue their partnership and plans for the Irina Foundation. At a press conference announcing the foundation, Shane supports Ilya after he departs from prepared remarks and publicly states that it is named for his mother, who experienced depression prior to her suicide.

=== Tough Guy ===
Shane Hollander appears in Tough Guy (2020), the third installment of the series, set during the 2018–19 NHL season. He is described as having an outstanding start to the season.

Later, Hollander appears in a joint press conference with Ilya Rozanov, who had joined the Ottawa Centaurs the previous July, which the Toronto Guardians, including protagonist Ryan Price, watch with surprise due to the pair's public reputation as rivals; Toronto players Dallas Kent and Troy Barrett make homophobic remarks and speculate about Hollander's sexuality. In December 2018, Toronto goaltender Wyatt Hayes joins the Ottawa Centaurs and refers to Hollander's close but unexplained association with Rozanov.

In the epilogue, during the first day of the Irina Foundation summer hockey camps for children, which Rozanov had invited Price to help coach, Price witnesses Hollander and Rozanov kissing and agrees to keep their secret.

=== Common Goal ===
Shane Hollander appears in Common Goal (2020), the fourth installment of the series, set during the 2019–20 NHL season. In November 2019, he scores a goal against the New York Admirals' goaltender and the novel's protagonist Eric Bennett.

A month later, Bennett and Scott Hunter discuss Hollander when Hunter reveals that Ilya Rozanov had invited him to coach at the Irina Foundation camps, expressing disbelief at the cooperation between the two rivals. During the conversation, Hunter reveals that Hollander is gay, which Bennett had not previously known. Hunter explains that Hollander had come out to his teammates and friends a year earlier and does not seek a major public announcement, and that most of the NHL is aware of his sexuality; Bennett states he wishes to take a similar approach regarding his bisexuality.

In January 2020, at the NHL All-Star Game, Bennett observes Hollander's closeness with Rozanov. After the skills competition, Hollander interrupts Rozanov's conversation with Bennett to say he is going to bed before leaving, after which Rozanov also departs.

=== Role Model ===
Shane Hollander appears in Role Model (2021), the fifth installment of the series, set during the 2020–21 NHL season. In November 2020, the novel's protagonist and Ilya Rozanov's Ottawa teammate Troy Barrett reflects on the Irina Foundation and its staff, considers rumours about Hollander's sexuality, and briefly contemplates asking Rozanov for Hollander's number as he finds him attractive.

In December 2020, during a game between Ottawa and Barrett's former team Toronto, Barrett's former friend Dallas Kent makes homophobic remarks about Barrett, Hollander, and Rozanov, prompting Rozanov to assault him. That same month, during a conversation in which Barrett comes out as gay to Rozanov and Rozanov comes out to him as bisexual, Barrett references the rumours about Hollander's sexuality and his closeness with Rozanov, but Rozanov shuts down the discussion.

In January 2021, Hollander and his Montreal teammate Hayden Pike engage in a brawl with Rozanov. Rozanov explains to Barrett that their behaviour is limited to on-ice competition and that they are friends off the ice. After Ottawa defeats Montreal, teammate Wyatt Hayes comments that Rozanov is always in a good mood when he defeats Hollander.

=== The Long Game ===
In The Long Game (2022), Shane Hollander and Ilya Rozanov reprise their roles as protagonists. Set during the 2020–21 NHL season and largely overlapping with Role Model, the novel opens in July 2020, he and Ilya disclose their relationship to their agent Farah Jalali, whom Shane had come out to in 2018. In February 2020, Shane had adopted a strict performance diet, and later won the Stanley Cup and the Conn Smythe Trophy. At the Irina Foundation camp, Shane makes an insensitive remark about Irina and proves less adept at coaching than Ilya. Ryan Price sees Shane and Ilya together again, which heightens Shane's anxiety about their secrecy. A subsequent double date with Price and his boyfriend Fabian Salah intensifies Shane's insecurities about his relationship with Ilya. After attending Fabian's concert, they briefly reconnect before the season begins. Two days before the season opener, a minor argument about Ilya's past partners exposes Shane's jealousy. In Montreal, Shane reflects on the team's success during his tenure and his frustration at no longer competing directly with Ilya, whose Ottawa team is struggling. During a game against Boston, Shane scores using Ilya's signature move. In Los Angeles, after weeks apart from Ilya, Shane and Hayden Pike discuss the possibility of Shane and Ilya's future parenthood. The following day, he meets Rose Landry, who advises him to prepare for the possibility of their relationship becoming public, and Shane relays Rose's advice to Ilya.

When Montreal plays Ottawa, Ilya skips his return flight to spend time with Shane. Tension escalates after Shane questions Ilya about his participation in an ESPN documentary about their rivalry; Ilya expresses frustration at concealing their relationship. In early November 2020, Ilya sends Shane selfies they had taken together at the 2014 NHL Awards. The next day, they watch the ESPN documentary, during which Shane observes Ilya's disturbed reaction to his April 2017 injury. Shane later learns NHL commissioner Roger Crowell wants to meet with him. In Manhattan, Crowell privately warns Shane against coming out publicly; Shane informs Ilya of the meeting. In December 2020, Shane discovers that Ilya has come out to teammate Troy Barrett. An argument follows, culminating on Boxing Day when Ilya voices his loneliness and the professional sacrifices he has made, and asks Shane to leave. After returning from Ottawa to Montreal, Shane reflects on his insensitivity. The next day, Ilya reveals he has been seeing a psychologist, and they reconcile. In early January 2021, news of Ottawa's plane engine failure forces Shane to confront the emotional consequences of their secrecy. When Ilya returns safely, Shane proposes, recreating a scenario Ilya had described to him at the cottage in July 2017; Ilya accepts, and they tentatively plan to go public the following summer.

At the 2021 NHL All-Star Game, Shane defeats Ilya in the fastest skater competition. The following morning, Shane supports Ilya when he confronts Crowell regarding his interference. After Barrett publicly comes out on Pride Night, Ilya is emotionally shaken, and Shane consoles him. In March 2021, a kiss between Shane and Ilya is inadvertently captured in the background of Hayden's FanMail video and goes viral on Twitter. Montreal's coach Theriault and roster react with anger, and Crowell summons Shane and Ilya to a meeting. Crowell issues an ultimatum: deny the relationship and cancel their wedding or risk their NHL careers. They refuse, and later that day publicly confirm their relationship, accompanied by Farah's official statement. In April 2021, during the Stanley Cup playoffs, Montreal is eliminated when Ilya scores the decisive goal for Ottawa after Shane trips, leading most of Shane's teammates to suspect he deliberately tripped. Days later, Scott Hunter invites them to join a new player organization aimed at confronting toxic hockey culture, and they accept. After Ottawa's elimination, Ilya discloses his struggles with depression and fears of suicidal ideation, and Shane vows to support him. In May 2021, a week after his birthday, he and Ilya publicly announce their engagement. In July 2021, Shane leaves Montreal for Ottawa, and he and Ilya marry in Ilya's backyard in Ottawa. The novel concludes in October 2021 at Ottawa's home opener, with Shane and Ilya playing on the same team and aspiring to win a Stanley Cup together.

=== Unrivaled ===
Shane is set to appear in Unrivaled (2027), the seventh installment of the series, once again as a central protagonist. Now publicly out and married to Ilya, he balances his role on their shared professional team with the intensified scrutiny and backlash that follow their relationship's public reveal, confronting new personal and professional challenges alongside his husband.

== On television ==
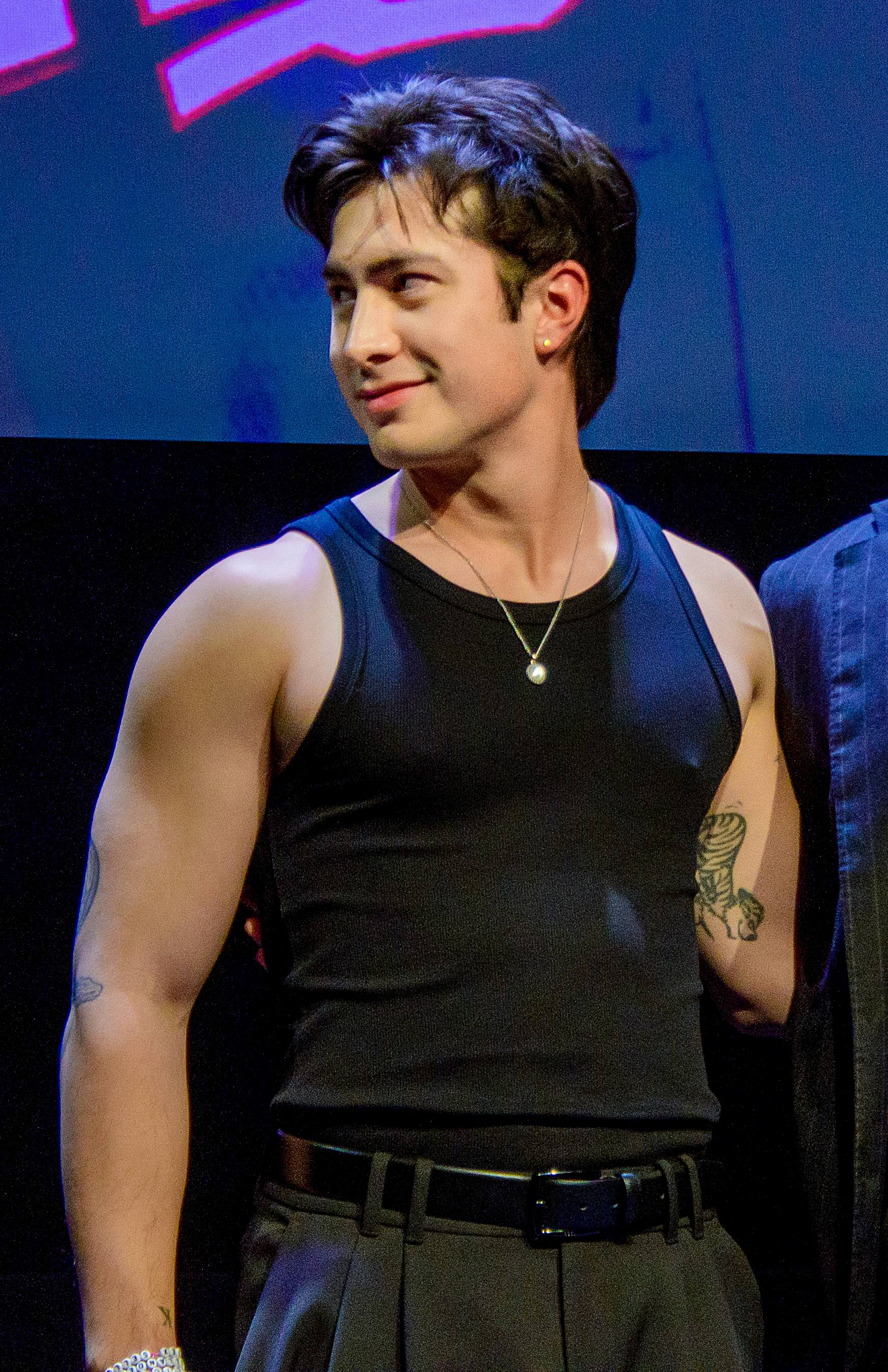
Hudson Williams (pictured in November 2025) portrays Shane Hollander in the television series Heated Rivalry

In Heated Rivalry (2025–present), a television adaptation of the Game Changers series directed, written, and executively produced by Jacob Tierney for the Canadian streaming service Crave, Shane is portrayed by Canadian actor Hudson Williams. Williams's casting was announced on 5 June 2025. Tierney said that "Hudson had all the seriousness [he] wanted out of Shane".

The actor described Shane as highly competent and outwardly conventionally masculine, yet privately struggling with his queerness, which he fears could threaten his career and sense of identity. Despite this internal conflict, he is portrayed as kind and gentle. To portray Shane, Williams was influenced by performances of Trevante Rhodes and Ashton Sanders in Moonlight (2016), Timothée Chalamet in Call Me by Your Name (2017) and Rooney Mara in Carol (2015). At the 14th Canadian Screen Awards, Williams won Best Leading Performance in a Drama Series for his portrayal of Shane. He also received a nomination for Individual Achievement in Drama at the 42nd TCA Awards.

To depict Shane's autism, Williams, who is neurodivergent himself, as he has attention deficit hyperactivity disorder (ADHD), took inspiration from his own father, who is also on the spectrum. He said: "Sometimes it is flat affect. It's just being immobile in your seat and taking 10 seconds to move your hand to do something because you don't know what this movement looks like or means. Sometimes it's making eight burgers because that's what the recipe calls for, so that's what you have to do." Williams also notably maintained limited facial expressions, conveying Shane's emotions primarily through his eyes. He has stated that he conceived Shane as having an oral fixation, incorporating behaviors such as requesting that straws be included in the character's drinks and chewing on hoodie drawstrings while texting: "I'm always putting things in my mouth! And I'll continue to do that for season [two]. There'll just be more things in my mouth."

The television adaptation also emphasized Shane's Asian heritage, with Tierney saying at the series' Toronto premiere: "There are not that many Asian players in hockey, so it just makes the whole thing more interesting. It would be monstrous just to make him white." Tierney incorporated additional references to Asian culture and Shane's Asian identity into the dialogue, explaining it to Teen Vogue: "I felt like [his cultural identity] needed to be said out loud because his name is Shane Hollander, so you can whitewash him in your brain really easily when you're reading a book or when you're listening in a way that I don't want to with this show."

=== Season one ===
The first season adapts the first two novels in the Game Changers series, Game Changer (2018) and Heated Rivalry (2019), and follows their narrative closely. Shane is drafted by the Major League Hockey (MLH) team Montreal Metros in 2009 and begins a secret sexual involvement with Ilya Rozanov (Connor Storrie) the following year. However, after a Montreal Metros versus Boston Raiders game is cancelled due to a snowstorm in February 2011, Shane and Ilya's plans to have anal sex for the first time are interrupted. They subsequently engage in sexting for two years until late 2013, when Shane hosts Ilya at his apartment and they have sex for the first time. Around the same period, Shane becomes involved in a post-game on-ice brawl with Scott Hunter (François Arnaud), who is implied to be aware of his involvement with Ilya.

And then the final nail through the fucking skull in my eyes was the scene with Yuna. That was the scene that felt the most pointed in my upbringing. You know, Asian family... There were some stereotypes that are true, in my experience and a lot of Asian kids' reality. Perfection, discipline, a lack of straying left and right meant a lot of old, outdated conventions and old biases. Being gay is one of them. So having that release... I didn't know at that point if Yuna would tell him, "Okay, well, do you want to be a part of this family or not? You're not going to be talking about that again." To the degree of which she brought him in and said, "That's okay," really just sent me.

— Hudson Williams, who is of maternal Korean descent, interviewed by Glamour

Shane maintains a close relationship with his mother, Yuna (Christina Chang), an avid Metros fan who assumes a "momager" role in the series and places pressure on him. She emphasizes the significance of his public representation of Asian Canadians in the MLH. Shane's heritage also makes him the target of microaggressions throughout the season. When Shane comes out to Yuna and his father, David (Dylan Walsh), Yuna apologizes for having made him feel unable to share the truth earlier. The season concludes with Shane's coming out to his parents and Ilya meeting Yuna and David, omitting the novel's epilogue.

=== Season two ===
The second season is set to adapt The Long Game (2022) and premiere in spring 2027. However, Tierney has announced that the season will include a scene depicting Shane coming out to his Montreal Metros teammates, an event that occurred off-page in the novel Heated Rivalry.

== Reception ==
Writing for The Guardian, Sue Carter wrote that the character of Shane Hollander has been embraced as part of Heated Rivalry's distinctly Canadian identity, with tourism campaigns and promotional material referencing him as a cultural figure, such as Ottawa Tourism changing its social media bio to the "birthplace of Shane Hollander". Mayor of Ottawa Mark Sutcliffe proclaimed 29 January 2026 Shane Hollander Day. Cosmopolitan endorsed their in-universe designation of the character as the "Hottest Man in the NHL", highlighting Shane's portrayal as physically attractive.

Ekta Sinha of Elle India pointed out that Shane, "neurodivergent-coded, anxious, holding his clothes nervously before getting into bed, is not mocked for his sensitivity". She praised the equality between him and Ilya, writing: "Two hyper-masculine athletes playing a hyper-masculine sport reveal emotional vulnerability without surrendering their masculinity. That dismantling matters."

Laura Sirikul of Forbes wrote about Shane's mixed Asian identity within professional hockey, highlighting his experience as one of few Asian players in a predominantly white sport and the importance of representation: "The wonderful thing about addressing Shane's Asian background is that it wasn't the main story. It was just a passing thought that is part of their everyday life and conversation, which the series did well." Kevin Ng of Reactor described Shane Hollander as challenging Western pop culture stereotypes about Asian men and praised the fact that a gay Asian protagonist is at the centre of a major television romance. Ng also acknowledged Shane as a nod to Nick Suzuki. E. Alex Jung of Vulture pointed out some readers' criticism of Shane's characterization as relying on racialized stereotypes, particularly in descriptions of him as smaller, prettier, hairless, and "like a girl," in addition to being a strict bottom. Out's Harry Stewart felt that the television adaptation's version of Shane was superior to the novel series' version of Shane, writing: "Shane isn't just a pretty face for the audience either, with his Asian-Canadian heritage expanded upon. We get the pressures of his identity as a representative figure in the media, and softer moments that he shares with his mother after coming out." Sinha described Shane's coming out scene as "generational healing."

Commentators have highlighted the significance of the character's autism-coded traits, noting that Heated Rivalry portrays him as capable of maintaining a successful career, social life, and romantic relationship, which some viewed as a positive example of normalized and respectful autistic representation. Sirikul mentioned Shane's behavioural characteristics, including differences in speech, movement, and social awareness, being discussed as part of the nuanced portrayal of neurodivergence: "Like Shane's mixed identity, his autism isn't put in the spotlight. In fact, nobody even seems aware of it, including Shane. It's just part of life for many on the spectrum and wonderfully normalizes the idea that it's everywhere." Writing for Time magazine, Sarah Kurchak wrote that Shane "diverges from that usual autistic archetype in a number of meaningful and refreshing ways." Kurchak attributed it to Reid's and Williams's authentic understanding of autism as "people who know and love autistic people", referring to Reid's child and Williams's father. Time's article was endorsed by the Autism Research Institute. Writing for CBC News, Natalie Stechyson said that Shane's autism is portrayed in a nuanced and subtle way: "Shane's autism isn't a plot point, a weakness or a stereotype – but it is present in everything he does." Stechyson also quoted advocate Amanda McGuinness's Instagram post, that said: "This portrayal contributes meaningfully to contemporary conversations about autism in media, demonstrating how autistic characters can be written and performed with authenticity, intention and respect." Hannah DeWitt of Thriveworks said that the character "shows that autism doesn't have to be loud to be meaningful. By making it just one part of who he is, Heated Rivalry offers a refreshing model of acceptance—one where autistic people can simply exist, thrive, and be loved exactly as they are."

== In popular culture ==
The 17 January 2026 episode of Saturday Night Live featured a sketch titled "Heated Wizardry", parodying Heated Rivalry and the Harry Potter film series. The sketch starred host Finn Wolfhard as a character combining Shane Hollander and Harry Potter, opposite Ben Marshall as a character combining Ilya Rozanov and Ron Weasley, within a storyline that merged elements from both series.

In April 2026, Pacific Marine Mammal Center named a rescued sea lion Hollander after the character. The animal was found malnourished, with injured flippers and a fishing hook lodged in her stomach, which was later removed via endoscopy.

== Bibliography ==
- Reid, Rachel (2018). Game Changer. Carina Press. ISBN 9781488038679.
- Reid, Rachel (2019a). Heated Rivalry. Carina Press. ISBN 9781488051241.
- Reid, Rachel (2020a). Tough Guy. Carina Press. ISBN 9781488068911.
- Reid, Rachel (2020b). Common Goal. Carina Press. ISBN 9781488076855.
- Reid, Rachel (2021a). Role Model. Carina Press. ISBN 9781488076985.
- Reid, Rachel (2022). The Long Game. Carina Press. ISBN 9780369704436.
