= Hudson Williams =

Canadian actor (born 2001)

- Williams in 2026
- Born: February 13, 2001 (age 25); Kelowna, British Columbia, Canada
- Occupation: Actor
- Years active: 2020–present
- Known for: Heated Rivalry

Hudson Williams (born February 13, 2001) is a Canadian actor. He rose to prominence for his breakout role as Shane Hollander in the Crave original television series, Heated Rivalry (2025–present), for which he won the Canadian Screen Award for Best Leading Performance in a Drama Series. He is currently starring in the Crave series Yaga, and will appear in the Netflix limited series The Altruists, and the films Apparatus and Tyrant.

== Early life and education ==
Williams was born on February 13, 2001, in Kelowna, British Columbia, and moved as a young child to Kamloops, British Columbia, where he was raised. His mother, an interior designer, is Korean, and his father, a mechanical engineer, is of British and Dutch descent.

Williams began his schooling at a French immersion kindergarten before transferring, at his mother's suggestion, to Beattie School of the Arts, where he studied dance, music, and theatre. He later graduated from Sa-Hali Secondary School in Kamloops, where he played on the basketball team and trained in mixed martial arts. He renewed his focus on acting in grade 11, and has said that taking acting classes in Vancouver persuaded him that acting could become a viable profession.

In 2020, Williams moved to Vancouver to attend Langara College, where he earned an acting certificate from the Film Arts program that same year. After graduating, he began writing and directing short films and attending acting auditions while working as a restaurant server at The Old Spaghetti Factory in New Westminster. His first short film as writer and director was Snow Angel.

== Career ==
=== Early work (2020–2024) ===
Williams built his early career through self-produced short films made with a recurring group of Vancouver-based collaborators, and the films attracted a significant rise in viewership following his rise to fame. He received the Best Ensemble award at the 2024 Vancouver Badass Film Festival for the short film, Devil Makes Three, and won Best First-Time Director at the 2026 Hollywood ShortsFest for his short film, Rancid.

His early screen credits include the episode "IRL" of the CBC drama Allegiance, the television films, Nobody Dumps My Daughter and All I Need for Christmas, and the episode "The Disciple" of the CBS series Tracker.

=== Heated Rivalry and breakthrough (2025–present) ===
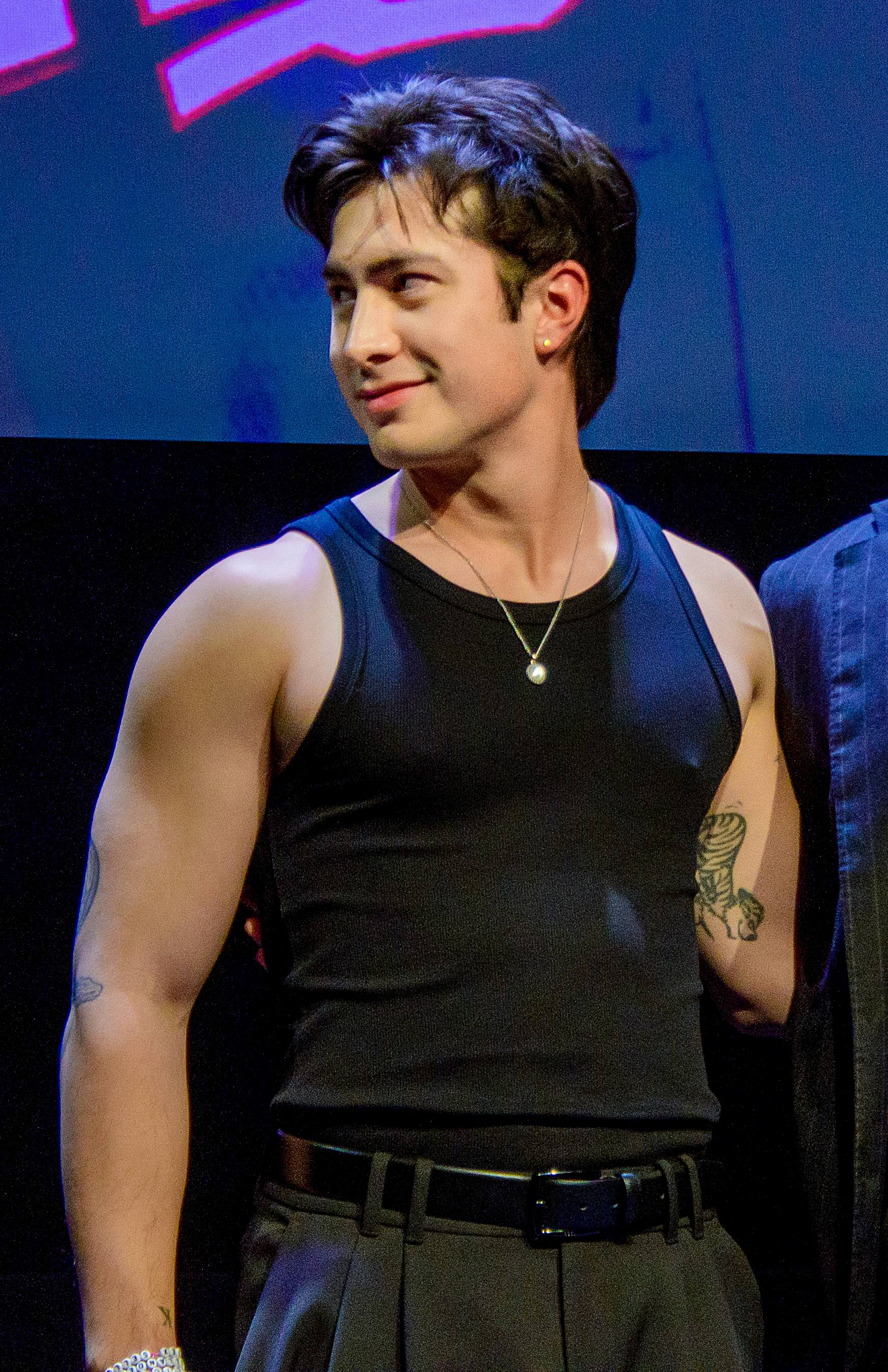
Williams in 2025

In 2025, Williams was cast as Shane Hollander in the sports romance television series, Heated Rivalry, created and directed by Jacob Tierney and based on the Game Changers novel series by Rachel Reid. His audition process included a self-tape, a callback with Tierney and three chemistry reads, with his chemistry with co-lead Connor Storrie being an important factor in Tierney's casting decision. Williams has said that his mother had previously voiced concern that he would have trouble getting acting roles as an Asian Canadian; however, his heritage proved to be crucial to his casting as Shane Hollander. Williams modeled aspects of the character on athletes such as Sidney Crosby, Connor McDavid, Kobe Bryant and Tom Brady.

Heated Rivalry premiered on Crave and HBO Max on November 28, 2025 and became a global success. Williams received praise for the subtlety of his acting and his ability to convey Hollander's inner thoughts, as well as his nuanced and non-stereotypical portrayal of an autistic character. Reid commented that Williams fully embodied the role, praising the expressiveness of his face. /Film singled out Williams and Storrie for their microexpression work, and the chemistry between the two leads has received extensive praise, with Kaiya Shunyata for RogerEbert.com writing that "Williams and Storrie share a chemistry so intense it rivals Bogart & Bacall". The series was renewed for a second season in December 2025, with the second season expected to release in April 2027.

In May 2026, Williams won Best Leading Performance in a Drama Series at the 2026 Canadian Screen Awards for his performance in Heated Rivalry, becoming the youngest actor to win the award at 25.

In December 2025, Williams signed with Creative Artists Agency for representation. That same month, he and Storrie starred in Ember & Ice, a three-episode romance fantasy audio series where Williams voiced the character Prince Finn Lunare. The episodes were released on the mobile audio platform Quinn between December 30, 2025 to January 5, 2026.

On February 28, 2026, Williams had a cameo appearance in the Saturday Night Live episode hosted by Storrie. He has also starred in music videos: as Count Orlok in Love Lucille's "Lights On" and then as the featured heartthrob character in Laufey's "Madwoman" video, alongside other prominent mixed Asian stars Alysa Liu, Lola Tung and Megan Skiendiel.

Williams made his Toronto International Film Festival debut in September 2026 with the premiere of Yaga and the individual event "Making Waves With...Hudson Williams".

=== Upcoming projects ===
In February 2026, Williams was cast as Henry Park in Yaga, a Crave mystery thriller series based on the play by Kat Sandler, starring alongside Carrie-Anne Moss, Noah Reid and Clark Backo. In April 2026, AMC+ acquired the exclusive United States streaming rights to the series and it is set to premiere in late 2026. On September 10, 2026, Yaga and Crave announced on Instagram that Williams will play two roles, Henry and Logan.

In March 2026, Netflix announced that Williams would appear in a recurring role as Duncan Rheingans-Yoo in The Altruists, a limited series about the collapse of the cryptocurrency exchange FTX, starring Julia Garner and Anthony Boyle. That same month, he was cast in a leading role opposite Dylan O'Brien in the feature film, Apparatus, directed by Sofia Banzhaf; in April 2026, he joined an ensemble cast including Charlize Theron, Julia Garner and Demi Moore in the culinary thriller film Tyrant, directed by David Weil.

Alongside acting, Williams continues to write and direct. In a January 2026 interview, Williams shared his aspiration to make his feature film directorial debut based on his own script in the next five years.

== Influences ==
Williams has named Heath Ledger as his all-time favourite actor and has also mentioned Michelle Williams, Mark Rylance, Marlon Brando and Parker Posey among the performers who have influenced him. Among filmmakers, he has cited Alfred Hitchcock, Billy Wilder, Ingmar Bergman and Stanley Kubrick as favourites. He has spoken of his longtime love of queer cinema, naming Moonlight and Brokeback Mountain among his favourite films, and has cited Rooney Mara in Carol and Trevante Rhodes in Moonlight as inspirations for his portrayal of Shane Hollander.

== Public image and brand partnerships ==
Following the release of Heated Rivalry, Williams experienced a rapid rise to fame. At the Golden Globe Awards in January 2026, where he was also a presenter with Storrie, he announced a donation to BC Children's Hospital. On January 16, 2026, he made his runway debut opening Dsquared²'s show at Milan Fashion Week. That same week, he also attended the Giorgio Armani fashion show. Williams' presence at Milan Fashion Week received widespread media coverage, with him being deemed the highlight.

On January 25, 2026, he and Storrie participated in the 2026 Winter Olympics torch relay in Feltre, Italy. That same month, Williams met Canadian prime minister Mark Carney at an event promoting the Canadian film and television industry in Ottawa. He attended the 98th Academy Awards and the Vanity Fair Oscars after-party in March 2026, where his appearances generated a combined media impact value of $6.16 million for designer brands Balenciaga and Bulgari.

Williams was named a "Friend of the House" for fashion brand Balenciaga in February 2026, appearing in the brand's "Heart and Body" campaign and often attending the brand's fashion shows and events. In April 2026, he became the first non-athlete to star in a campaign for Peloton Interactive. Williams' Peloton campaign video drew massive engagement, amassing over five million views on YouTube within the first six days of its release.

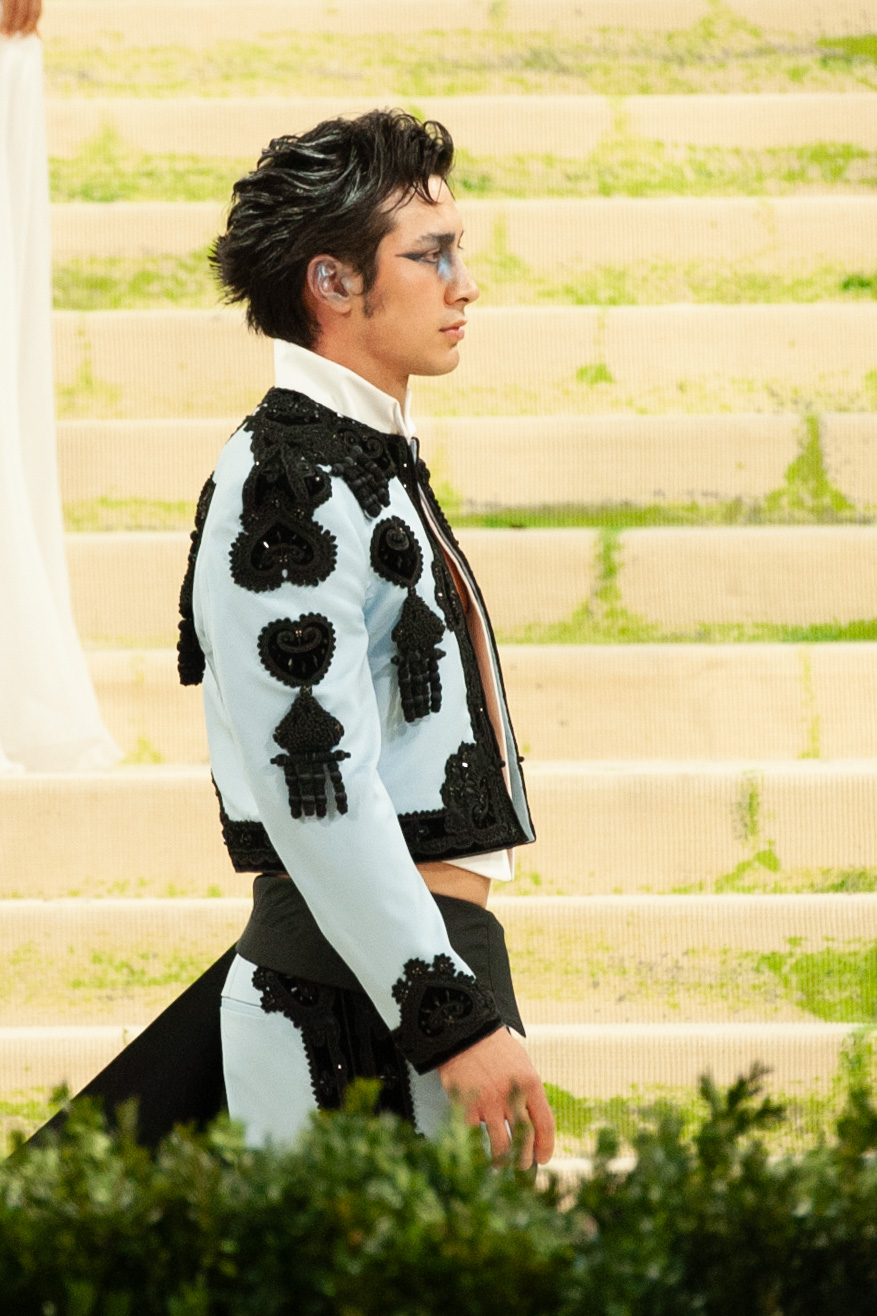
Williams at the 2026 Met Gala

Williams attended his first Met Gala in May 2026 as a guest at the Instagram table in a custom matador-inspired look designed by Balenciaga creative director Pierpaolo Piccioli and eye makeup inspired by one of his favorite films Black Swan. That same month, Williams was also named a "Friend of the House" for jewelry brand, Bulgari, and appeared in the brand's "Gold & Steel" campaign. In September, he starred in an advertisement for their Serpenti collection. In October, he was announced as the Maison's newest ambassador. He starred in their 2026 "Joy is in Our Hands" holiday campaign alongside Caleb McLaughlin and Joey King.

In May, Williams was included Gold House's 2026 Gold100 list, which celebrates the 100 leaders most responsible for shaping global culture over the past year. Williams was honored under "New Gold", recognizing the next generation of cultural trailblazers. Later that month, Williams was included in Variety's "8 APIs Up Next in Entertainment" list, which celebrates Asian Pacific Islanders across entertainment and highlights rising global talent.

In August 2026, Williams was announced as a brand ambassador for Korean skincare brand SKIN1004. Williams had previously featured the brand's products in a YouTube video detailing his skincare routine for The Cut that went viral. In an announcement posted on their social media, SKIN1004 confirmed that Williams was the first-ever global ambassador for the brand.

Dubbed the "Hudson Williams effect", Williams' influence on brands (even without official partnerships) has drawn widespread attention, such as the viral demand surge for a $2 Canadian Tire tote bag after Williams was photographed carrying his groceries in one in August 2026 in Toronto. Similarly, his book recommendations have resulted in increased demand for the titles across retailers and libraries.

Williams has spoken publicly about the challenges of navigating his sudden rise to global fame, including privacy intrusions from paparazzi and unsolicited photography. In March 2026, Williams and Heated Rivalry co-star, François Arnaud, issued a joint statement condemning bigoted and parasocial behaviour among portions of the show's fanbase.

== Personal life ==
In a February 2026 Instagram story, Williams shared that he is in a long-term relationship with Vancouver-based tattoo artist Katelyn Larson. The couple made their first public appearance at the Vanity Fair Oscars after-party in March 2026. In interviews, he has shared that he has ADHD.

== Filmography ==
=== Films ===
Key
†	Denotes films that have not yet been released

Year	Title	Role	Notes	Ref.
TBA	Apparatus †	Tyler	Post-production	
TBA	Tyrant †	TBA	Post-production	

=== Television ===
Year	Title	Role	Notes	Ref.
2024	Allegiance	Junior	Episode: "IRL"	
2024	Nobody Dumps My Daughter	Sean	Television film	
2024	All I Need for Christmas	TJ	Television film	
2025	Tracker	Brandon Stokes	Episode: "The Disciple"	
2025–present	Heated Rivalry	Shane Hollander	Main role; 6 episodes	
2026	Saturday Night Live	Himself	Episode: "Connor Storrie / Mumford & Sons"	
2026	Yaga	Henry Park / Logan Casey	Main role; 8 episodes	
2026	The Altruists	Duncan Rheingans-Yoo	Recurring role; 3 episodes	
2026	The Assembly	Himself	Episode: "Hudson Williams"	

=== Audio ===
Year	Title	Role	Notes	Ref.
2025–2026	Ember and Ice	Prince Finn Lunare	3 episodes	

=== Music videos ===
Year	Title	Artist	Role	Ref.
2023	"Effigy"	The Jins		
2026	"Lights On"	Love Lucille	Count Orlok	
2026	"Madwoman"	Laufey	The Man	

== Awards and nominations ==
Awards and nominations received by Hudson Williams
Award	Year (Note: The listed year refers to the date of the ceremony, not necessarily the year in which the work was released/premiered.)	Category	Nominated Work	Result	Ref.
Vancouver Badass Film Festival	2024	Best Ensemble	Devil Makes Three	Won	
ACTRA Award	2026	Members' Choice Series Ensemble	Heated Rivalry	Won	
Canadian Screen Awards	2026	Best Lead Performer, Drama	Heated Rivalry	Won	
Dorian Awards	2026	Best TV Performance — Drama	Heated Rivalry	Nominated	
Gold Derby TV Awards	2026	Best Drama Actor	Heated Rivalry	Won	
Gold Derby TV Awards	2026	Breakthrough Performer of the Year	Heated Rivalry	Won	
Gold Derby TV Awards	2026	Ensemble of the Year	Heated Rivalry	Won	
Hollywood ShortsFest	2026	Best First-Time Director (Note: Shared with co-director Alex Vance)	Rancid	Won	
Kelowna Independent Film Festival	2026	Best Director	Rancid	Nominated	
Kelowna Independent Film Festival	2026	Best Performance	Rancid	Nominated	
Television Critics Association Awards	2026	Individual Achievement in Drama	Heated Rivalry	Nominated	
