= Connor Storrie =

American actor (born 2000)

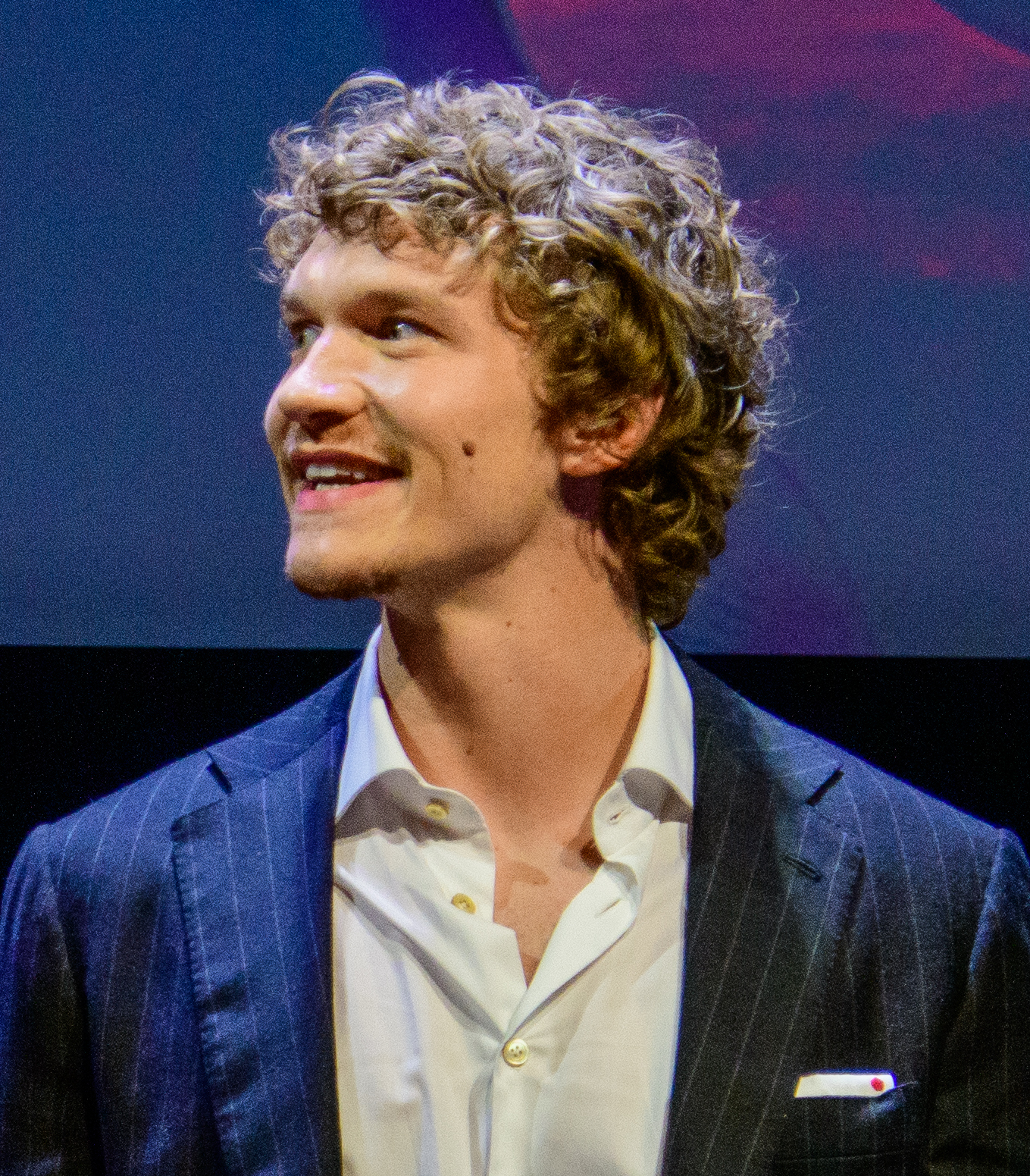
- Storrie in 2025
- Born: February 22, 2000 (age 26); Aurora, Colorado, U.S.
- Occupation: Actor
- Years active: 2018–present
- Known for: Heated Rivalry

Connor Storrie (born February 22, 2000) is an American actor. He is best known for his breakout role as Ilya Rozanov in the sports romance series Heated Rivalry (2025–present). He received a Primetime Emmy Award nomination for hosting Saturday Night Live in 2026.

== Early life and education ==
Storrie was born on February 22, 2000, in Aurora, Colorado. At a young age, his family moved to Odessa, Texas, where he was raised and attended a performing arts school. Storrie has explained that his family lived in a disadvantaged neighborhood, so the school's programs sought to provide children from communities affected by crime, violence, and poverty with constructive alternatives. He also trained in gymnastics as a competitive tumbler.

As a teenager, Storrie moved with his family to Southern California. He attended Westlake High School and spent his junior year studying abroad in France. He later began pursuing acting professionally while working as a restaurant server in Los Angeles, where he also trained in improv at The Groundlings.

== Career ==
=== Career beginnings (2018 - 2025) ===
Storrie began his career appearing in short films and minor roles. He additionally worked as a model, appearing in fashion campaigns and editorial projects. Alongside his on-camera work, he also immersed himself in Los Angeles's alternative-theater clown scene. Storrie later credited his experience clowning with improving his ability to handle challenging acting situations.

In 2023, Storrie made his feature film debut as Liam Hauser in the coming-of age-drama Riley. The following year, he appeared in the DC Comics film Joker: Folie à Deux, directed by Todd Phillips, as a young Arkham Asylum inmate whose character is ultimately revealed to be the real Joker. The movie earned Storrie his SAG card. Later that year, he starred as the lead role in the science-fiction thriller April X. His performance earned him a Best Performance in a Debut Feature nomination at Raindance Film Festival.

In 2025, Storrie filmed a four-episode arc in the nineteenth season of the crime drama series Criminal Minds. His role was expanded from a planned one-episode appearance after his performance impressed showrunner Erica Messer and the production team.

=== Breakthrough (2025 - present) ===
In November 2025, Storrie began starring as Russian ice hockey player Ilya Rozanov in the Canadian sports romance series Heated Rivalry, based on the Game Changers novel series by Rachel Reid. For the role, he learned to deliver Russian dialogue and developed a Russian accent for his English-language scenes. Storrie received widespread critical acclaim, with his eligibility for the Primetime Emmy Awards becoming a subject of discussion among critics and industry publications. The series being a Canadian production ultimately rendered his performance ineligible for consideration. That same year, Storrie voiced the character Dane in the Quinn romance fantasy audio series Ember & Ice alongside his Heated Rivalry co-star Hudson Williams. In December 2025, he wrapped production on his feature directorial debut Transaction Planet.

On February 28, 2026, Storrie hosted Saturday Night Live, for which he later became the youngest Primetime Emmy Award Outstanding Guest Actor in a Comedy Series nominee. Also in February, Storrie joined the ensemble cast of the A24 comedy film Peaked, directed by Molly Gordon. In April, he was announced to be starring opposite Melissa McCarthy in the thriller film Turpentine, directed by Craig Zobel. In May 2026, Storrie had a cameo appearance in For All Mankind. The same month, he was cast in the A24 period film Please, directed by Halina Reijn.

In the summer of 2026, he filmed The Bell Jar, playing Marco in Sarah Polley's adaptation of the novel of the same name by Sylvia Plath. In October 2026, Storrie was announced to be playing the villain opposite Ryan Gosling in Marvel Studios' Ghost Rider, directed by Shawn Levy. The following month, Storrie was announced to star in Lionsgate Films' Wet, alongside Javier Bardem, Rebecca Ferguson, and Odessa A'zion.

In November 2026, Storrie was announced as one of two actors selected for the 2026 BAFTA Breakthrough cohort in North America, which recognizes emerging talent across the film, television, and games industries.

== Fashion and endorsements ==
=== Fashion ===
Following his breakthrough role in Heated Rivalry, Storrie gained recognition within the international fashion industry. In March 2026, he was the cover star of Vogue Adria. In April, he was featured in American Vogue's "Star Players" editorial, a portfolio of portraits featuring "young actors and musicians to watch right now." That same month, he appeared alongside his stylist, James Yardley, as one of the cover stars of The Hollywood Reporter's annual "Red Carpet Royals and Power Stylists" issue, which recognizes leading celebrity stylists and their clients.

==== Yves Saint Laurent (YSL) ====
Storrie became global ambassador for French luxury fashion house Saint Laurent in 2026. Creative director Anthony Vaccarello and Purple PR executive Andrew Lister both described strong competition among luxury brands to sign him, with Lister telling Vogue that the bidding war had "gone through the roof."

Storrie made his Met Gala debut in May 2026, attending the event dressed by Saint Laurent as a representative of the brand. According to The Hollywood Reporter's Met Gala Red Carpet Power Rankings, Storrie ranked first among male attendees, generating $14 million in Media Impact Value (MIV) for the brand.

In August 2026, Storrie fronted the brand's Fall 2026 campaign. In November 2026, he also featured in the brand's Winter campaign, which marked the 60th anniversary of Le Smoking, its iconic women's tuxedo.

==== Tiffany & Co. ====
Storrie wore jewelry from American luxury jewelry company Tiffany & Co. to the 2026 Golden Globe Awards and the 2026 Actor Awards, before being named House Ambassador for the brand in April 2026.

=== Advertising ===
In April 2026, Storrie starred in Look Behind You, a horror-inspired advertising short film for American telecommunications company Verizon, directed by Nia DaCosta. The campaign featured Storrie in a series of horror-themed scenarios involving Verizon smartphone services.

== Filmography ==
=== Film ===
Key
†	Denotes films that have not yet been released

Year	Title	Role	Note	Ref.
2018	Ridester Professionals	Passenger		
2018	Ménage à Trois		Short film	
2019	Watch and Guide	Landon Jongler	Short film	
2020	White Terror	Black figure		
2020	The Internet Kills	Julian	Short film	
2021	A Letter on Loss	Peter	Short film	
2022	Headless Horseman	Tom		
2023	Twenty-Two	Anthony	Short film	
2023	Riley	Liam Hauser		
2024	Joker: Folie à Deux	Young Inmate		
2025	April X	Baxter		
2027	Peaked †	TBA	Post-production	
2027	Please †	TBA	Post-production	
2028	Ghost Rider †	TBA	Pre-production	
TBA	Transaction Planet †	—N/a	Post-production; writer, director	
TBA	Turpentine †	TBA	Post-production	
TBA	The Bell Jar †	Marco	Post-production	
TBA	Wet †	TBA	Pre-production	

=== Television ===
Key
†	Denotes television productions that have not yet been released

Year	Title	Role	Notes	Ref.
2023	Tiny Beautiful Things	Apartment Guy	Episode: "Pilot"	
2025–present	Heated Rivalry	Ilya Rozanov	Main role; 6 episodes	
2026	Saturday Night Live	Host	Episode: "Connor Storrie / Mumford & Sons"	
2026	For All Mankind	Russian Spetsnaz soldier	Episode: "Brave New World"	
2026	Criminal Minds	Lance Kingston	Season 19; 4 episodes	

=== Web series ===
Year	Title	Role	Notes	Ref.
2019	Stuck	Andrew	3 episodes	
2025–2026	Ember & Ice	Dane Solari	Audio series; main role; 3 episodes	

== Awards and nominations ==
Awards and nominations received by Connor Storrie
Award	Year (Note: The listed year refers to the date of the ceremony, not necessarily the year in which the work was released/premiered.)	Category	Nominated Work	Result	Ref.
ACTRA Awards	2026	Members' Choice Series Ensemble	Heated Rivalry	Won	
Dorian Awards	2026	Best TV Performance — Drama	Heated Rivalry	Nominated	
Gold Derby TV Awards	2026	Ensemble of the Year	Heated Rivalry	Won	
Gold Derby TV Awards	2026	Comedy Guest Actor	Saturday Night Live (episode: "Connor Storrie / Mumford & Sons")	Won	
Primetime Emmy Awards	2026	Outstanding Guest Actor in a Comedy Series	Saturday Night Live (episode: "Connor Storrie / Mumford & Sons")	Nominated	
Raindance Film Festival	2026	Best Performance in a Debut Feature	April X	Nominated	
Television Critics Association Awards	2026	Individual Achievement in Drama	Heated Rivalry	Nominated	
