= Rachel Reid (author) =

Canadian author

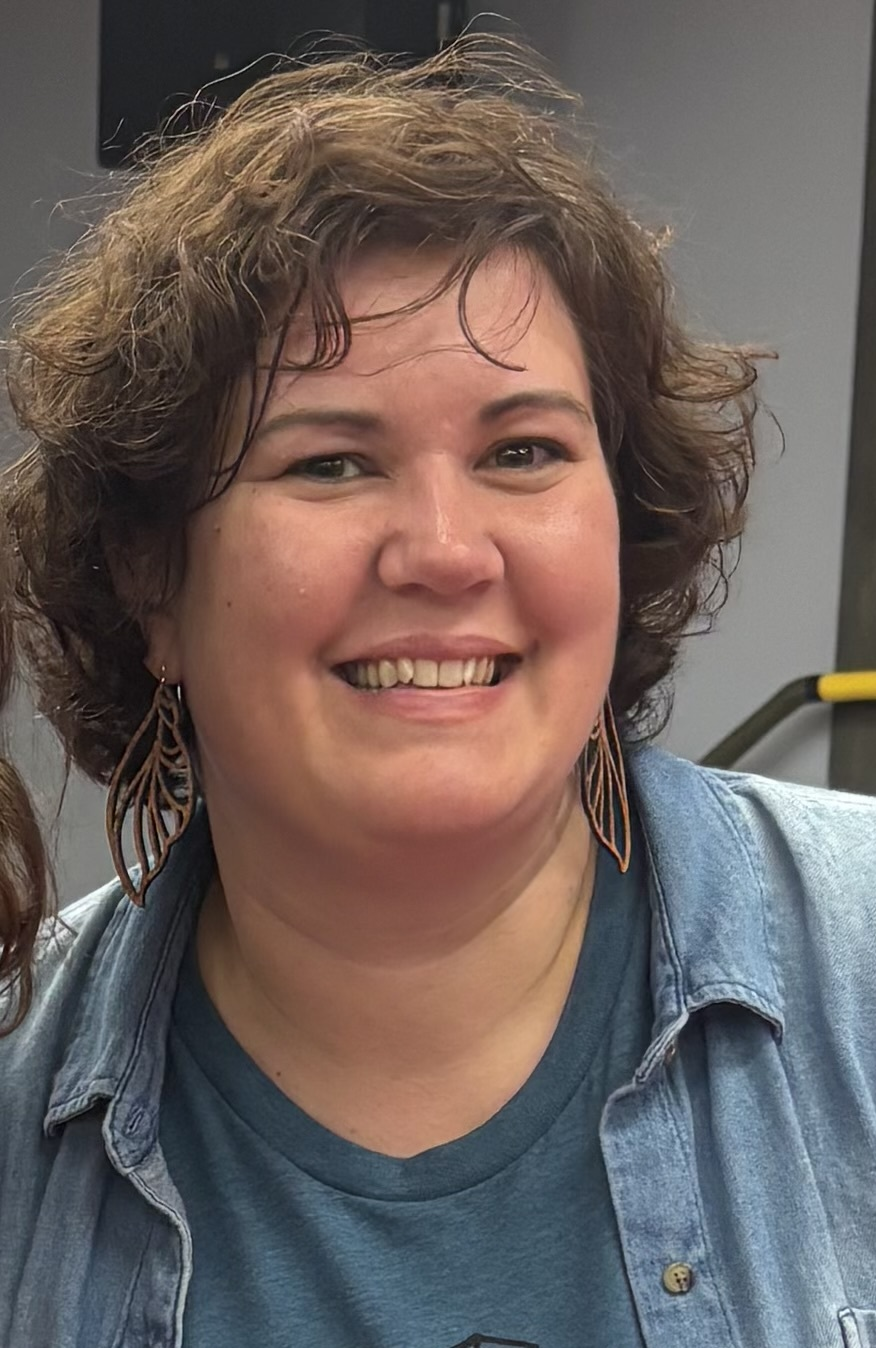
- Reid in Toronto in 2025
- Born: Rachelle Goguen; September 2, 1980 (age 46); Halifax, Nova Scotia, Canada
- Occupation: Author
- Years active: 2012–present
- Known for: Game Changers book series
- Notable work: Heated Rivalry
- Spouse: Matt Reid (m. 2008)
- Children: 2
- Website: rachelreidwrites.com

Rachelle Goguen (born September 2, 1980), known by her pen name Rachel Reid, is a Canadian author from Nova Scotia. She is known for writing the Game Changers book series and other hockey-themed gay romance novels. A 2025 television series, Heated Rivalry, has been adapted from the first two books in the Game Changers series.

== Career ==
Reid was born in Halifax, Nova Scotia in 1980. She is a lifelong fan of ice hockey, and played hockey when she was a teenager. She is the Canadian writer of the Game Changers book series and other hockey-themed gay romance novels. She said in 2023, "Game Changer came from a place of me being angry at hockey culture and how clearly homophobic it was and is, and all the other things that made me really ashamed to be a hockey fan. That whole series attacks the NHL and hockey culture quite a bit."

Reid gained recognition after romance novelist Cat Sebastian recommended her books on social media in 2020.

A 2025 television series, Heated Rivalry, was adapted from the first and second books in the Game Changers series. The Toronto Star reported that Reid's book had entered the top ten for bestselling Canadian works of fiction just ahead of the streaming release of Heated Rivalry on Crave in Canada.

Reid has been working on the next book in her Game Changers series, titled Unrivaled, since early 2025. In an interview with Entertainment Weekly, she said, "I feel like more than any other book I've written, this one needs to be really good. I hope I'm giving people what they want out of this." The book was originally scheduled to publish in September 2026 but was pushed back to June 2027. Reid cited health issues and her busy schedule as the reason for the delay.

== Works ==
All of Reid's books have been published by Carina Press (an imprint of Harlequin Romance).

=== Game Changers series ===
1. Game Changer (2018) – American professional hockey player Scott Hunter falls for barista Kip Grady.
2. Heated Rivalry (2019) – Shane Hollander, the Canadian captain for the Montreal Voyageurs, finds a nemesis—and a lover—in the cocky Russian captain of the Boston Bears, Ilya Rozanov.
3. Tough Guy (2020) – Toronto pro hockey star Ryan Price reconnects with musician Fabian Salah, his teenage crush.
4. Common Goal (2020) – Silver fox hockey goalie Eric Bennett, finally open to dating men, and Kyle Swift, a younger grad student and bartender, find that their new no strings attached relationship may just be more than they expected.
5. Role Model (2021) – Fresh off a messy breakup, pro hockey player Troy Barrett has been traded to the worst team in the league, but soon finds himself irresistibly attracted to peppy social media manager Harris Drover.
6. The Long Game (2022) – Shane Hollander and Ilya Rozanov have been secretly dating for ten years, and Ilya wants to finally go public with their relationship.
7. Unrivaled (2027) – Newly married and out, Shane Hollander and Ilya Rozanov face public backlash and a growing movement against them as they navigate life, love, and their careers on the same team.

=== Other novels ===
- Time to Shine (2023) – Backup goalie and loner Landon Stackhouse becomes the roommate of charming winger Casey Hicks.
- The Shots You Take (2025) – Tragedy reconnects hockey stars Riley Tuck and Adam Sheppard.

== Personal life ==
Reid lives in Bedford, Nova Scotia. She was diagnosed with Parkinson's disease in August 2023. Reid chose her pen name because "it is much easier to say, spell and remember than Rachelle Goguen". She married Matt Reid in 2008, and the couple have two children.

== See also ==
- List of writers from Nova Scotia
