= Canadian Screen Award for Best Supporting Performance in a Drama Program or Series =

Annual Canadian television award

The Canadian Screen Award for Best Supporting Performance in a Drama Series is an annual award, presented by the Academy of Canadian Cinema and Television as part of the Canadian Screen Awards program, to honour the best leading performance in a Canadian television drama series.

It is a merger of the former awards for Best Supporting Actor in a Drama Series and Best Supporting Actress in a Drama Series, following the academy's announcement in August 2022 that it would start presenting gender-neutral acting awards instead of gendered ones.

== 2020s ==
Year	Actor	Series	Ref
2022; 11th Canadian Screen Awards
2022; 11th Canadian Screen Awards	Christopher Plummer	Departure	
2022; 11th Canadian Screen Awards	Thom Allison	Coroner	
2022; 11th Canadian Screen Awards	Wendy Crewson	Departure	
2022; 11th Canadian Screen Awards	Kevin Hanchard	Hudson & Rex	
2022; 11th Canadian Screen Awards	Karen LeBlanc	Departure	
2022; 11th Canadian Screen Awards	Daniel Maslany	Murdoch Mysteries	
2022; 11th Canadian Screen Awards	Andy McQueen	Coroner	
2022; 11th Canadian Screen Awards	Dwain Murphy	Diggstown	
2023; 12th Canadian Screen Awards
2023; 12th Canadian Screen Awards	Braeden Clarke	Little Bird	
2023; 12th Canadian Screen Awards	Salvatore Antonio	Slasher: Ripper	
2023; 12th Canadian Screen Awards	Paula Brancati	Slasher: Ripper	
2023; 12th Canadian Screen Awards	Kevin Durand	Essex County	
2023; 12th Canadian Screen Awards	Emma Hunter	Moonshine	
2023; 12th Canadian Screen Awards	Ayisha Issa	Transplant	
2023; 12th Canadian Screen Awards	Ksenia Daniela Kharlamova	Robyn Hood	
2023; 12th Canadian Screen Awards	Lynn Rafferty	Bad Behind Bars: Jodi Arias	
2024; 13th Canadian Screen Awards
2024; 13th Canadian Screen Awards	Enrico Colantoni	Allegiance	
2024; 13th Canadian Screen Awards	Sarah Booth	Plan B	
2024; 13th Canadian Screen Awards	Kevin Hanchard	Hudson & Rex	
2024; 13th Canadian Screen Awards	Jonny Harris	Murdoch Mysteries	
2024; 13th Canadian Screen Awards	Karen Knox	Wynonna Earp: Vengeance	
2024; 13th Canadian Screen Awards	Daniel Maslany	Murdoch Mysteries	
2024; 13th Canadian Screen Awards	Clare McConnell	Murdoch Mysteries	
2024; 13th Canadian Screen Awards	Karen Robinson	Law & Order Toronto: Criminal Intent	
2025; 14th Canadian Screen Awards
2025; 14th Canadian Screen Awards	Sophie Nélisse	Heated Rivalry	
2025; 14th Canadian Screen Awards	Wendy Crewson	Irish Blood	
2025; 14th Canadian Screen Awards	Eve Edwards	Bet	
2025; 14th Canadian Screen Awards	Amy Goodmurphy	Wild Cards	
2025; 14th Canadian Screen Awards	Ksenia Daniela Kharlamova	Heated Rivalry	
2025; 14th Canadian Screen Awards	Yanna McIntosh	Hell Motel	
2025; 14th Canadian Screen Awards	Kataem O'Connor	Murdoch Mysteries	
2025; 14th Canadian Screen Awards	Karen Robinson	Law & Order Toronto: Criminal Intent	
