= VanArts =

Art school in Vancouver, Canada

Vancouver Institute of Media Arts
- Type: Private
- Established: 1995
- Affiliations: PTIB, EQA, StudentAid BC, EduCanada, NACC
- President: Colin Phillips
- Location: Vancouver, British Columbia, Canada
- Campus: 700 - 333 Terminal Avenue, Vancouver, BC Canada, V6A 4C1
- Nickname: VanArts
- Website: vanarts.com

Vancouver Institute of Media Arts (VanArts) was a private post-secondary school located in Vancouver, British Columbia, Canada. Founded in 1995, VanArts offers one-year diploma programs in visual, media and performing arts. The school offered degree pathways in collaboration with its university partners.

As of August 28, 2026, Vanarts will transfer its 2d and 3d programs over to Vancouver Community College, who has agreed to support the existing programs.

VanArts was officially designated through the Private Training Institutions Branch (PTIB).

== History ==
VanArts was founded in 1995 with Lee Mishkin as its founding program director.

VanArts' first campus was on West Broadway in Vancouver. In January 1997, it moved downtown to 837 Beatty Street. Initially offering programs for Classical Animation, the school expanded to offer programs for Computer Animation in 1998, Game Art Design in 2003, Visual Effects in 2004, then Digital Photography in 2006, the first school to do so in North America.

In 2006, VanArts moved to a new campus at 626 West Pender Street. In 2008, the William Davis Centre for Actors Study joined with VanArts, becoming its acting department. In July 2010, VanArts moved to 570 Dunsmuir Street. In 2011, departments were made for Web Development & Interactive Design, Broadcasting, and Online Media. In 2021, the school moved to its current location, a custom made floor at 333 Terminal Avenue. In 2026, Vanarts closed its doors and is no longer a going concern.

=== Notable faculty ===
- Chilton Crane, Head of Acting department – credits include Supernatural, The X-Files, Once Upon a Time.
- Wade Howie, Department Head of Visual Effects for Film and Television & Game Art Design – credits include Jurassic Park, The Mask, Terminator 2: Judgment Day.

=== Notable alumni ===
- Jordan Armstrong (News Anchor/Reporter, Global BC)
- Braeden Clarke (Actor, Outlander)
- Georgie Daburas (Actor, Chilling Adventures of Sabrina)
- Aaron Douglas (Actor, Battlestar Galactica)
- Galen Fott (Director/Animator, I Want My Hat Back)
- Lucy Lawless (Actor, Xena: Warrior Princess, Ash vs. Evil Dead)
- Steven Cree Molison (Actor, Blackstone)
- Eden Muñoz (VFX Supervisor/Studio Owner, Pixel Perfect)
- Porus Vimadal (Elle India Graduates 2016 - Photography of the Year)
- Paul Zeke (Visual Effects, Winner VES Award 2019 for Outstanding Animated Character in an Episode or Real-Time Project, Lost in Space)
