= Canadian Screen Award for Best Leading Performance in a Drama Series =

Annual Canadian television award

Canadian Screen Award
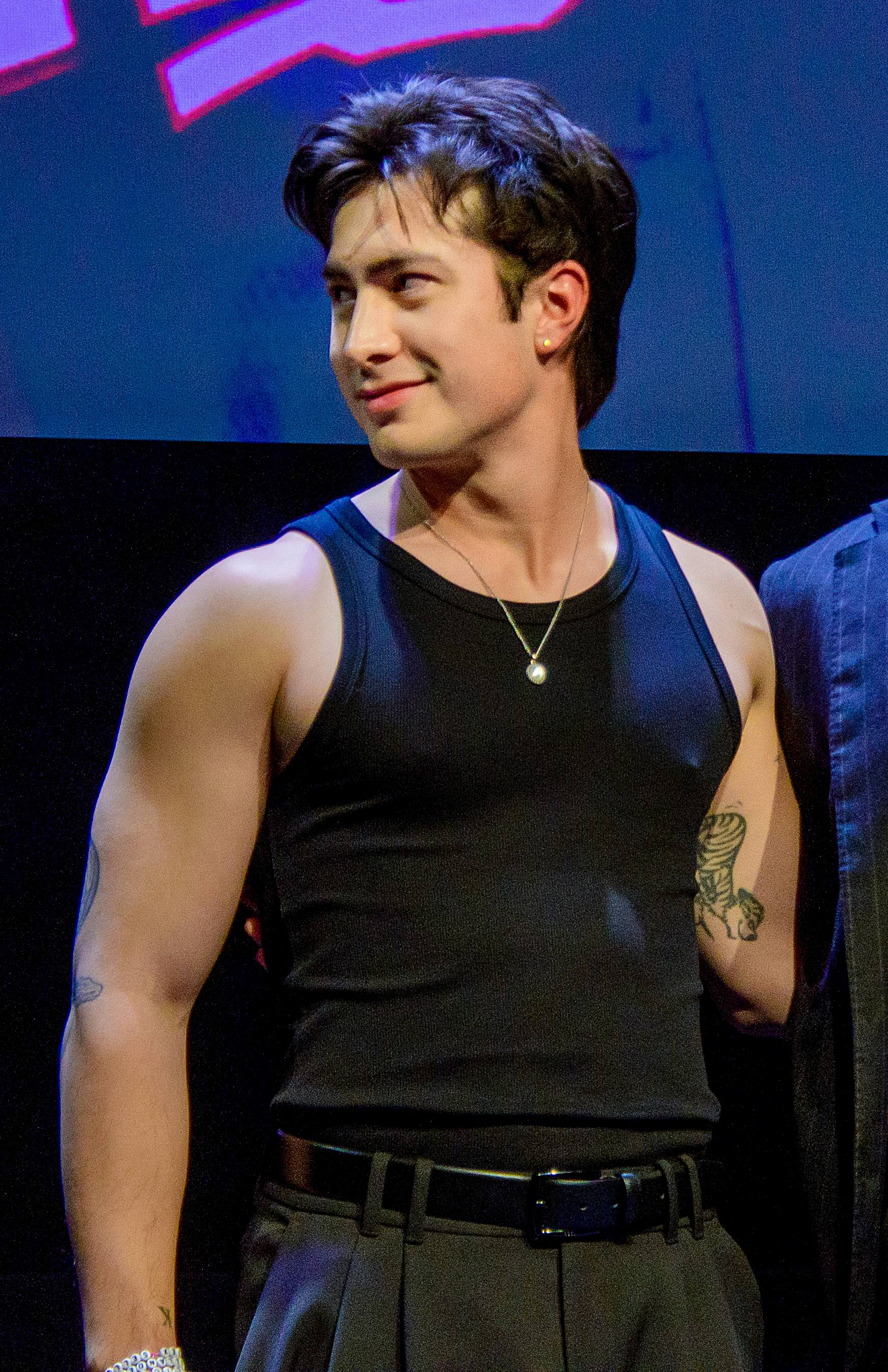
- 2025 winner: Hudson Williams
- Country: Canada
- Presented by: Academy of Canadian Cinema & Television
- First award: 2022
- Currently held by: Hudson Williams for Heated Rivalry (2025)
- Website: academy.ca/awards

The Canadian Screen Award for Best Lead Performance in a Drama Series is an annual award, presented by the Academy of Canadian Cinema and Television as part of the Canadian Screen Awards program, to honour the best leading performance in a Canadian television comedy series.

It is a merger of the former awards for Best Actor in a Drama Series and Best Actress in a Drama Series, following the academy's announcement in August 2022 that it would start presenting gender-neutral acting awards instead of gendered ones.

== 2020s ==
Year	Actor	Series	Ref
2022; 11th Canadian Screen Awards
2022; 11th Canadian Screen Awards	Hamza Haq	Transplant	
2022; 11th Canadian Screen Awards	Aml Ameen	The Porter	
2022; 11th Canadian Screen Awards	Jennifer Finnigan	Moonshine	
2022; 11th Canadian Screen Awards	Laurence Leboeuf	Transplant	
2022; 11th Canadian Screen Awards	Mayko Nguyen	Hudson & Rex	
2022; 11th Canadian Screen Awards	John Reardon	Hudson & Rex	
2022; 11th Canadian Screen Awards	Ronnie Rowe Jr.	The Porter	
2022; 11th Canadian Screen Awards	Mouna Traoré	The Porter	
2023; 12th Canadian Screen Awards
2023; 12th Canadian Screen Awards	Darla Contois	Little Bird	
2023; 12th Canadian Screen Awards	Victor Garber	Family Law	
2023; 12th Canadian Screen Awards	Hamza Haq	Transplant	
2023; 12th Canadian Screen Awards	Ellyn Jade	Little Bird	
2023; 12th Canadian Screen Awards	Laurence Leboeuf	Transplant	
2023; 12th Canadian Screen Awards	Meredith MacNeill	Pretty Hard Cases	
2023; 12th Canadian Screen Awards	Adrienne C. Moore	Pretty Hard Cases	
2023; 12th Canadian Screen Awards	Mayko Nguyen	Hudson & Rex	
2024; 13th Canadian Screen Awards
2024; 13th Canadian Screen Awards	Supinder Wraich	Allegiance	
2024; 13th Canadian Screen Awards	Vinessa Antoine	Plan B	
2024; 13th Canadian Screen Awards	Grace Dove	Bones of Crows	
2024; 13th Canadian Screen Awards	Hélène Joy	Murdoch Mysteries	
2024; 13th Canadian Screen Awards	Michelle Morgan	Heartland	
2024; 13th Canadian Screen Awards	Kathleen Munroe	Law & Order Toronto: Criminal Intent	
2024; 13th Canadian Screen Awards	Mayko Nguyen	Hudson & Rex	
2024; 13th Canadian Screen Awards	Aden Young	Law & Order Toronto: Criminal Intent	
2025; 14th Canadian Screen Awards
2025; 14th Canadian Screen Awards	Hudson Williams	Heated Rivalry	
2025; 14th Canadian Screen Awards	François Arnaud	Heated Rivalry	
2025; 14th Canadian Screen Awards	Carolina Bartczak	Plan B	
2025; 14th Canadian Screen Awards	Allan Hawco	Saint-Pierre	
2025; 14th Canadian Screen Awards	Michelle Morgan	Heartland	
2025; 14th Canadian Screen Awards	Kathleen Munroe	Law & Order Toronto: Criminal Intent	
2025; 14th Canadian Screen Awards	Melanie Scrofano	Revival	
2025; 14th Canadian Screen Awards	Supinder Wraich	Allegiance	
