= Ksenia Daniela Kharlamova =

Canadian actress and model

- Ксения Даниэла Харламова
- Born: 2 December 2002 (age 23); Toronto, Ontario, Canada
- Occupations: Actress; model
- Years active: 2017–present
- Known for: Heated Rivalry
- Relatives: Valeri Kharlamov (great-uncle); Alexander Kharlamov (first cousin once removed); E. M. Roach (paternal grandfather)
- Awards: Full list
- Modelling information
- Height: 5 ft 8 in (1.73 m)
- Hair colour: Brown
- Agency: Hero Artists Agency

Ksenia Daniela Kharlamova (Russian: Ксения Даниэла Харламова; born 2 December 2002) is a Canadian-American actress and model. She is best known for playing Svetlana Vetrova in the Crave original television series Heated Rivalry (2025–present).

== Early life ==
Kharlamova was born in Toronto to a Russian-Ukrainian mother and a Trinidadian father. She spent the first few years of her life in Toronto before moving to Saint Petersburg, Russia, after which she describes being "ping-ponged" between the two places. She has cited Russian as her first language. Her great-uncle was the Soviet ice hockey player Valeri Kharlamov, through whom she is also of distant Basque descent. Ksenia claims E. M. Roach, the renowned Trinidadian poet, as her paternal grandfather.

She received training in dance, singing and theatre, as well as in Russian circus traditions, and began her career appearing as an extra in television series and films.

== Career ==
Kharlamova was signed to an agency at the age of 16 and began her career as an actress and model. Her first credited role was in the 2017 science fiction film Downsizing.

She made her television debut in 2020 in the Amazon Prime series The Boys. In 2022, she appeared as Yazmin in the CBC series Strays.

In 2023, Kharlamova portrayed Jasmyn in the Roku series Slip. That same year, she became a series regular as Much in the Global TV series Robyn Hood, earning a nomination for the Best Supporting Performance in a Drama Program or Series at the 12th Canadian Screen Awards. The following year, she appeared as Annabelle Volkov in The Boarding School Murders.

In 2025, Kharlamova appeared as Nicole in the FX series Adults and as Ashley in the Canadian medical drama SkyMed. She also played a singer in the film A Very Jonas Christmas Movie. Later that year, she was cast as Svetlana Sergeevna Vetrova in the Crave romantic drama Heated Rivalry. The series is based on the Game Changers novel series by Rachel Reid, although Kharlamova's role was expanded from the character as depicted in the novel Heated Rivalry. It earned her another nomination for Best Supporting Performance in a Drama Program or Series at the 14th Canadian Screen Awards, which she lost to her Heated Rivalry co-star Sophie Nélisse.

On 13 February 2026, Kharlamova made her runway debut, walking for Christian Cowan at New York Fashion Week.

She will appear as Stacey Mallory in the Amazon coming-of-age series, Sterling Point, premiering in August 2026. During the same month, she was announced to be starring opposite Gustaf Skarsgård in the psychological thriller film Exit to the Guillotine, directed by Zachary Cotler. The film is scheduled for release in 2027.

== Filmography ==
Key
†	Denotes works that have not yet been released

=== Film ===
Year	Title	Role	Notes	Ref.
2017	Downsizing	Colony Member		
2024	The Boarding School Murders	Annabelle Volkov		
2025	A Very Jonas Christmas Movie	Singer		
2027	Exit to the Guillotine †	TBA		
TBA	Videocall Murder †	Zara Dawson		

=== Television ===
Year	Title	Role	Notes	Ref.
2020	The Boys	Girl in Classroom	Episode: "What I Know"	
2022	Strays	Yazmin	3 episodes	
2023	Slip	Jasmyn	3 episodes	
2023	Robyn Hood	Much	8 episodes	
2025	SkyMed	Ashley	Episode: "The Fire"	
2025	Adults	Nicole	Episode: "Pilot"	
2025–present	Heated Rivalry	Svetlana Sergeevna Vetrova	4 episodes	
2026	Sterling Point	Stacey Mallory	2 episodes	

== Accolades ==
Award	Year	Category	Work	Result	Ref.
Canadian Screen Awards	2024	Best Supporting Performance in a Drama Program or Series	Robyn Hood	Nominated	
Canadian Screen Awards	2026	Best Supporting Performance in a Drama Program or Series	Heated Rivalry	Nominated	
