= Ellyn Jade =

Canadian actress and model

Ellyn Jade is the stage name of Jade Willoughby, a Canadian actress and model. She is most noted for her role as Patti in the television drama series Little Bird, for which she received a Canadian Screen Award nomination for Best Leading Performance in a Drama Series at the 12th Canadian Screen Awards in 2024.

A member of the Whitesand First Nation, she is of mixed Ojibwe and Black Canadian descent. She began her career as a model, before beginning her acting career with a recurring role in the drama series Frontier.

She has also appeared in the television series Burden of Truth, Diggstown, Vikings and Letterkenny, the short films Seeking Bidmaadiziiwin and Redlights, and the feature film Nika and Madison.
