= Finality of Dusk =

2023 Canadian science fiction film

- Directed by: Madison Thomas
- Written by: Madison Thomas; Katarina Ziervogel
- Produced by: Rebecca Gibson; Kyle Irving; Darcy Waite
- Starring: Marika Sila; Cherrel Holder; Chris Dodd; Meegwun Fairbrother
- Cinematography: Gabriel Levesque
- Edited by: Jonathan Lê
- Music by: Justin Delorme
- Production company: Eagle Vision
- Release dates: November 3, 2023 (Red Nation); November 30, 2023 (Whistler)
- Running time: 97 minutes
- Country: Canada
- Languages: English; American Sign Language

Finality of Dusk is a 2023 Canadian post-apocalyptic science fiction film directed by Madison Thomas, from a screenplay by Thomas and Katarina Ziervogel. Starring Marika Sila, Cherrel Holder, Chris Dodd, and Meegwun Fairbrother, the film follows Ishkode (Sila) and Niife (Holder), who team up to survive in a world where the air has become too toxic for humans to breathe, requiring people to wear specialized breathing helmets at all times, all the while being pursued by Odin (Dodd), a deaf man who is on a mission to be this world's last survivor.

== Production ==
=== Filming ===
The film was shot on location in rural Manitoba in 2021. Co-writer Madison Thomas did not want to set the film in a city or even a small town as is typical of the genre: "With even small cities having become unlivable, the film instead focuses on a remote Indigenous First Nation in western Manitoba and the lands that surround it." Thomas has Ojibwe and Saulteaux ancestry, while Katarina Ziervogel is a member of Sagkeeng First Nation in Manitoba.

=== Characterization ===
Thomas was "keen" that the two protagonists should not speak a common language, and so needed help from Ziervogel: "Growing up, I experienced communication barriers, especially with people who don’t know American Sign Language... When there’s a language/communication barrier between two individuals, it’s easier for them to walk away and move on to the next person. Niife is determined to break that barrier in this film despite Ishkode’s attempts to walk away."

=== Sound ===
The film makes use of special sound design features to boost the filmgoing experience for deaf and hard-of-hearing audiences.

== Release ==
Finality of Dusk premiered at the Red Nation Film Festival on November 3, 2023, followed by its Canadian premiere in the Borsos Competition program at the Whistler Film Festival on November 30, 2023.
