= Coming Home: Wanna Icipus Kupi =

- Directed by: Erica Marie Daniels
- Written by: Erica Marie Daniels; Jennifer Podemski; Kim Wheeler
- Produced by: Tanya Brunel; Daniel Morin; Michelle van Beusekom
- Edited by: Stéphane Allard; Heidi Haines
- Music by: Wyler Wolf
- Production companies: Rezolution Pictures; Logical Mayhem
- Distributed by: Fremantle Canada
- Release date: June 30, 2023 (Crave)
- Running time: 88 minutes
- Country: Canada
- Language: English

Coming Home: Wanna Icipus Kupi is a 2023 Canadian television documentary film, directed by Erica Marie Daniels. Released as a companion piece to the drama series Little Bird, the film profiles the Sixties Scoop through interviews with members of the cast of the series and survivors of the original events.

The film won the Donald Brittain Award for best social or political television documentary at the 12th Canadian Screen Awards in 2024.
