= The Broken Chain =

- Genre: Drama; War; Action
- Written by: Earl W. Wallace
- Directed by: Lamont Johnson
- Starring: Pierce Brosnan; Graham Greene; Eric Schweig; Buffy Sainte-Marie; Wes Studi
- Music by: Charles Fox
- Country of origin: United States
- Original language: English

Production
- Executive producers: Robert M. Sertner; Frank von Zerneck
- Producer: Cleve Landsberg
- Production locations: Williamsburg, Virginia; Yorktown, Virginia
- Cinematography: William Wages
- Editor: Susan B. Browdy
- Running time: 93 minutes

Original release
- Release: December 12, 1993

The Broken Chain is a 1993 TV movie made by the TNT network. It tells the true story of Haudenosaunee leader Thayendanegea participating in the French and Indian War and the American Revolutionary War.

== Cast ==
- Pierce Brosnan as William Johnson
- Eric Schweig as Thayendanegea, also known as Joseph Brant
- Wes Studi as Seth/Chief/Speaker for the Tribes
- Buffy Sainte-Marie as Gesina "Grandmother"/Seth's wife
- Graham Greene as Peace Maker (Spirit)
- Elaine Bilstad as Catherine

== See also ==
- List of films about the American Revolution
