= Darla Contois =

Cree-Saultreux writer and actress

Darla Contois (Wasakahaw Mikisu Iskwew) is an Indigenous (Cree-Saulteaux) writer and actress from Misipawistik Cree Nation, Grand Rapids, Manitoba, Canada. She stars as Esther Rosenblum / Bezhig Little Bird in the Canadian drama television series Little Bird, which premiered on Crave and APTN lumi on May 26, 2023.

Contois graduated from the Centre for Indigenous Theatre's professional training program in 2014 and attended David Smukler's National Voice Intensive. Her solo show White Man’s Indian premiered at Summerworks 2017 in Toronto where she was awarded the Emerging Artist Award. Her most recent work, The War Being Waged, was produced by Winnipeg's Prairie Theatre Exchange as part of their 2021–2022 season.

The War Being Waged was shortlisted for the Governor General's Award for English-language drama at the 2023 Governor General's Awards. In 2024, she won the Canadian Screen Award for Best Leading Performance in a Drama Series at the 12th Canadian Screen Awards, for the television series Little Bird.

== Filmography ==
Year	Title	Role	Notes
2015	Dhaliwal '15	Nina	TV series
2018	Eros	Aniibishan	Short movie
2023	Little Bird	Esther / Bezhig	TV series
2023	Frank Gets the Job Done	Sheryl	Short movie
2024	Aberdeen	Pritchard	Movie
2024	Murdoch Mysteries	Tanis Stony Dickens	TV series
2025	Many Wounds	Crystal	
2026	Ancestral Beasts		
2026	Ancestral Beasts		
2026	The Wolf Will Tear Your Immaculate Hands		
