= Roxann Whitebean =

Canadian Mohawk artist and director

- Notable work: Legend of the Storm (2015); Thunder Blanket (2016); Karihwanoron: Precious Things (2017); Skindigenous (2020); The Haudenosaunee Canoe Journey (2020)

Roxann (Karonhiarokwas) Whitebean is an independent film director and media artist from the Mohawk Territory of Kahnawake (Canada).

== Career ==
Whitebean started her career in film and television as an executive producer's assistant for the first season of television series Mohawk Girls. She pursued as the extras casting director and 3rd assistant director during the second and third season of the show.

She wrote, directed and produced her first short fiction film, Legend of the Storm, with financial support from the Canada Council for the Arts. Starring Noelani Jasmine Rourke in the role of the young protagonist Otsistas, and filmed on location in Kahnawake, Legend of the Storm is a "poetic allegory" inspired by Whitebean's experience as a child living through the events of the Oka crisis in 1990. The film was premièred at the Montreal First Peoples' Festival in 2015 alongside film director Alanis Obomsawin’s documentary Kanehsatake: 270 Years of Resistance, to mark the 25th anniversary of the crisis.

Three days after completing the filming of Legend of the Storm, Whitebean was diagnosed with stage 3 breast cancer. Over the following eighteen months, she documented her fight against her illness, including her choice to mix traditional aboriginal medicine and modern oncological treatments (including radiotherapy, chemotherapy, and a double mastectomy). It was turned into the 5-part CBC documentary series Thunder Blanket (2016), described as "surprisingly sentimental, but it also contain some poignant and touching moments about the emotional and physical toll of living with cancer" by Jules Morgan in the medical journal The Lancet Oncology. In the last instalment of the documentary series, Whitebean indicates that she already started working on a new film project "based on the 'cancer monster' that appeared in her dreams".

In 2015, she won the Drama Pitch Prize at the ImagineNATIVE Film + Media Arts Festival Film and media arts festival in Toronto, and was selected as an Aboriginal Filmmaker Fellowship recipient at the Whistler Film Festival in Whistler, Canada, for her short film project The Paradigm.

In 2016, Whitebean participated in the National Screen Institute's Aboriginal Documentary program, which provides training for teams of producers and directors aspiring to make short documentaries. During this ten-month long program, she produced the short documentary Flat Rocks (dir. Courtney Montour), then made available on APTN and NFB online streaming websites. Whitebean also directed the CBC short digital documentary Precious Things about language revitalization efforts in Kahnawake as part of the CBC Short Docs: Indigenous series as part of the festivities of Canada's 150th anniversary. She participates as a producer's assistant and researcher to the new television show Dream Big (created by Tracey Deer and Rachelle White Wind), about the dream careers of thirteen Indigenous youth and their encounters with mentors from these fields.

== Filmography ==
Director:

- Rose (2022) Telefilm Canada
- Pulse (2022) APTN
- The Haudenosaunee Canoe Journey (Feature Documentary) (2020) APTN,
- Skindigenous (season 2 & 3) (Television Series) APTN, PBS
- Enhior'hen:ne [Tomorrow] (2019) Cinema Politica
- Living Culture/Speaking Truth (2018) Indigenous Leadership Institute
- Raven's Quest (2018-2022) (Television Series) TVO
- Little Hard Knox (2017) CBC
- The Paradigm (2016) The Canada Council for the Arts
- Karihwanoron: Precious Things (2017) CBC
- Thunder Blanket (2016) (documentary series, 5 episodes) (co-directed with Brittany Leborgne)
- Legend of the Storm (2015) (short)

Producer:

- Flat Rocks (2016) APTN dir. Courtney Montour)

Producer's Assistant / Researcher:

- Dream Big (2017) (television series)

== Writing ==
- Broken
- SkyMed (2022)
- Diggstown, season 4 (2022)

== Awards and honours ==
Year 2015	Film	Festival Whistler Film Festival	Award Aboriginal Fellowship	Country Canada
2015	The Paradigm	Whistler Film Festival	Aboriginal Filmmaker Fellowship	Canada
2015	The Paradigm	ImagineNATIVE Film and Media Arts Festival	Drama Pitch Prize	Canada
