= Eric Schweig =

Canadian actor (born 1967)

- Born: Ray Dean Thrasher; 19 June 1967 (age 59); Inuvik, Northwest Territories, Canada
- Occupation: Actor
- Years active: 1985–present
- Children: 2 foster children
- Relatives: Willie Thrasher (uncle)

Eric Schweig (born Ray Dean Thrasher; 19 June 1967) is a Canadian Inuvialuk actor perhaps best known for his role as Chingachgook's son Uncas in The Last of the Mohicans (1992) and the hitman Avanti in One Battle After Another (2025). Schweig has played in over 30 movies, including as Pike Dexter in the movie Big Eden (2000), for which he won the Outstanding Actor Award at the Outfest film festival.

== Early life ==
Schweig was born Ray Dean Thrasher on 19 June 1967, in Inuvik, Northwest Territories. He is of mixed race (Inuit, Portuguese, German, and Senegalese). He is the oldest of seven children, who were all adopted out as part of the Canadian government's failed attempt at forcing Inuit and First Nations children to assimilate into white society. Schweig's biological mother died of alcoholism in 1989. He never met her. "She didn’t drink a drop of alcohol until we were taken away," says Schweig. "We were part of the whole assimilation program—forcibly taken away, although my adoptive parents told me I wasn't." His maternal uncle is musician Willie Thrasher. Schweig was adopted at six months of age by an English-speaking German-French family. He spent his childhood in Inuvik until he was six, when his family moved to Bermuda. They moved back to Canada after a year.

He described his adoptive parents as having discouraged him from connecting with his Inuit heritage. Schweig said, "I eventually grew tired of living in a prison without walls and ran away when I was 16. What transpired between then and now has been a roller coaster of alcohol, drugs, violence, failed relationships, despair and confusion. Who am I? Where do I come from? Where is my family? Where do I belong? When life's mystery has been shattered by strangers watching over you, a lot of these questions are lost."

After running away, he experienced homelessness and supported himself by framing houses. In 1985, he was part of the cast of The Cradle Will Fall, an experimental adaptation of Frank Wedekind's Spring Awakening produced by Theatre of Change at the Actor's Lab; this was his first experience as an actor. He was later approached by a producer who suggested he audition for a role in the movie called The Shaman's Source (1990). The film launched his career in the film industry.

== Career ==
Schweig's numerous screen credits (over thirty) include his portrayal of Uncas in the epic motion picture The Last of the Mohicans (1992) and Pike Dexter in the movie Big Eden (2000), for which he won the Outstanding Actor Award at the Outfest film festival. In 1992, he was cast as Black Thunder in the Canadian Broadcasting Corporation mini-series By Way of the Stars. Among his period film credits since The Last of the Mohicans, Eric became the famous Mohawk leader Joseph Brant/Thayendanegea for TNT's telefilm The Broken Chain (1993), playing for the first time the main character in a movie (Schweig appeared with Wes Studi again for this motion picture). It was shot primarily in North Carolina. He starred in Disney's The Scarlet Letter and Tom and Huck with Amy Wright in 1995. In 1996, he appeared as a Comanche protagonist, Buffalo Hump, in the Larry McMurtry miniseries Dead Man's Walk. More recently, he played the lead role in films addressing more contemporary issues facing aboriginal and Native American people: Skins (2002), Cowboys and Indians: The J.J. Harper Story (2003) and One Dead Indian (2006).

== Personal life ==
Schweig was interested in the arts in childhood, and has since become a master carver. Under the tutelage of artist Vern Etzerza, he studied traditional Pacific Coast carving before directing his talent specifically towards custom and traditional Inuit Spirit Masks, in collaboration with master carver Art Thompson.

Schweig previously struggled with alcoholism, which he attributed to trauma from his abusive childhood. He has stated that Big Eden (2000) was the first movie in which he was entirely sober.

In 2017, Schweig adopted two foster siblings.

== Awards ==
- 2000 - Grand Jury Award L.A. Outfest, Outstanding Actor in a Feature Film for Big Eden
- 2008 - Honorary Doctorate of Education from Nipissing University
- 2011 - Nomination for a Leo Award for Best Lead Performance by a Male in a Dramatic Series for his role as corrupt band Chief Andy Fraser in the TV series Blackstone.

== Filmography ==
Year	Title	Role	Notes
1987	The Shaman's Source	Robert Crow	
1992	By Way of the Stars	Black Thunder	TV mini-series
1992	The Last of the Mohicans	Uncas	
1993	For Love and Glory	Moses Moon	TV movie
1993	The Broken Chain	Joseph Brant / Thayendanegea	TV movie
1994	Due South	Inuit Hunter	Episode: "Pilot"
1994	Squanto: A Warrior's Tale	Epenow	
1994	Pontiac Moon	Ernest Ironplume	
1995	500 Nations	(voice)	TV mini-series
1995	Follow the River	Wildcat	TV movie
1995	The Scarlet Letter	Metacomet	
1995	Tom and Huck	Injun Joe	
1996	Red River	Napoléon	TV mini-series
1996	Dead Man's Walk	Buffalo Hump	TV mini-series
2000	Big Eden	Pike Dexter	
2002	Skins	Rudy Yellow Lodge	
2003	Mr. Barrington	Samuel	
2003	Cowboys and Indians: The John Joseph Harper Story	Harry Wood	TV movie
2003	The Missing	Club Foot El Brujo / Pesh-Chidin	
2005	Into the West	Sitting Bull	
2005	It Waits	Joseph Riverwind	
2005	Shania: A Life in Eight Albums	Jerry Twain	TV movie
2006	One Dead Indian	Sam George	TV movie
2006	Indian Summer: The Oka Crisis	Terry Doxtator	TV mini-series
2006	Not Like Everyone Else	Tim Blackbear	
2006	Mr. Soul	Steve Lonethunder	
2007	Bury My Heart at Wounded Knee	Gall	
2009–2014	Cashing In	Matthew Tommy	TV series
2009	Kissed by Lightning	Solomon 'Bug' King	
2009–2015	Blackstone	Chief Andy Fraser	
2010	A Flesh Offering	Mishomis	
2010	Casino Jack	Chief Poncho	
2013	Maïna	Quujuuq	
2013	Longmire	Dolan Lone Elk	
2014	Elementary	Leon Moody	S3 E6: Terra Pericolosa
2017	Supernatural	Sergeant Joe Philips	Season 13 Episode 6
2018	The Grizzlies	Harry Aviak	
2020	Barkskins	Chief Tehonikonhraken	Season 1, Episodes 7 & 8
2020	Brother, I Cry	Dean	
2023	Little Bird	Asin	TV series
2025	One Battle After Another	Avanti	
