= Ancestral Beasts =

2026 Canadian film

- Directed by: Tim Riedel
- Written by: Tim Riedel
- Produced by: Tim Riedel; Fawnda Neckoway
- Starring: Morgan Holmstrom; Darla Contois; Gail Maurice; Asivak Koostachin
- Cinematography: Joey Forte
- Music by: Justin Delorme
- Production companies: Michif Koonteur; Buffalo Gal Pictures; Kistikan Pictures
- Distributed by: Mongrel Media
- Release date: July 22, 2026 (Fantasia)
- Running time: 104 minutes
- Country: Canada
- Language: English

Ancestral Beasts is a Canadian horror film, written and directed by Tim Riedel and released in 2026. Riedel's full-length directorial debut, the film stars Morgan Holmstrom as Elyse, a Métis woman who returns to her family home after struggling with her mental health, but is forced to battle a supernatural demon to protect her family.

The cast also includes Darla Contois, Asivak Koostachin, Gail Maurice, Jess Salgueiro, Josh Strait, Agnes Tong, Shannon Baker, Victoria Gwendoline, Ray Strachan, Emmanuel Oderemi, Jesse Nobess and Sarah-Lynne Otsuji.

== Production ==
The film was inspired in part by Riedel's own upbringing as the son of a mother who was a survivor of the Sixties Scoop, and who was later diagnosed with borderline personality disorder.

Riedel toured a five-minute short film version to various film markets and festivals in 2025 as proof of concept, prior to shooting the full-length version in the fall. The film was produced by Michif Koonteur, Buffalo Gal and Kistikan Pictures, with Tina Keeper, Phyllis Laing and Edmon Rotea as executive producers.

== Distribution ==
The film premiered at the 30th Fantasia International Film Festival in July 2026. It has been acquired for commercial distribution by Mongrel Media.

== Awards ==
At the 2026 Reelworld Film Festival, Riedel, Fawnda Neckoway and Edmon Rotea won the award for Outstanding Feature Film Producer.

The film is also slated to screen in the Borsos Competition program at the 2026 Whistler Film Festival.
