= Day of the Dead (TV series) =

2021 American horror television series

- Genre: Horror
- Created by: Jed Elinoff and Scott Thomas
- Based on: Day of the Dead by George A. Romero
- Starring: Keenan Tracey; Daniel Doheny; Natalie Malaika; Morgan Holmstrom; Kristy Dawn Dinsmore
- Country of origin: United States
- Original language: English
- No. of seasons: 1
- No. of episodes: 10

Production
- Executive producers: Stan Spry; Jeff Holland; Drew Brown
- Production companies: Entertainment Force; Cartel Entertainment; HiTide Studios

Original release
- Network: Syfy
- Release: October 15 – December 17, 2021

Day of the Dead is an American horror television series based on the 1985 film that premiered on Syfy on October 15, 2021, and concluded on December 17, 2021.

== Premise ==
Six strangers try to survive the first 24 hours of an undead invasion.

== Cast and characters ==
- Keenan Tracey as Cam McDermott, a high school senior and son of a local police detective who spends his free time working odd jobs to get out of his small Pennsylvania hometown
- Daniel Doheny as Luke Bowman, the son of town mayor, Paula Bowman
- Natalie Malaika as Lauren Howell, a sarcastic assistant mortician at the local mortuary
- Morgan Holmstrom as Sarah Blackwood, former Special Forces now working on a fracking crew outside of town. She discovers a mysterious body which plunges her into the middle of a zombie invasion.
- Kristy Dawn Dinsmore as Amy, a life coach and daughter of the town doctor. When the dead start to rise, she begins a transformation as she fights for survival.
- Miranda Frigon as Paula Bowman, the town Mayor
- Christopher Russell as Trey Bowman, Paula's husband and Luke's father
- Dejan Loyola as Jai Fisher, a doctor and Amy's fiancé

== Episodes ==
No.	Title	Directed by	Written by	Original release date	U.S. viewers (millions)
1	"The Thing in the Hole"	Steven Kostanski	Teleplay by : Jed Elinoff & Scott Thomas	October 15, 2021	0.277
2	"Chum"	Steven Kostanski	Jed Elinoff & Scott Thomas	October 22, 2021	0.216
3	"The Grey Mile"	Steven Kostanski	Jared Rivet & J. Wilder Konschak	October 29, 2021	0.184
4	"Forest of the Damned"	Steven Kostanski	Maisie Culver	November 5, 2021	0.272
5	"'Til the Dead Do Us Part"	Jacquie Gould	Scott Thomas & Jed Elinoff	November 12, 2021	0.180
6	"The Lady Birders of Nepa"	Jacquie Gould	Michael V. Ross	November 19, 2021	0.221
7	"Their Evil Was Our Evil"	Jacquie Gould	Liz Hsiao Lan Alper	November 26, 2021	0.191
8	"To Anyone Who Can Hear My Voice"	Jem Garrard	Jed Elinoff & Scott Thomas	December 3, 2021	0.211
9	"Death Comes to Paymart"	Jem Garrard	Jed Elinoff & Scott Thomas	December 10, 2021	0.213
10	"Choke on 'Em!"	Jem Garrard	Jed Elinoff & Scott Thomas	December 17, 2021	0.284

== Production ==
In February 2020, it was announced Syfy had given a straight to series order of 10 episodes for a series based on Day of the Dead. The show was written by Jed Elinoff and Scott Thomas who also served as showrunners. In October 2020, it was announced Keenan Tracey, Daniel Doheny, Natalie Malaika, Morgan Holmstrom and Kristy Dawn Dinsmore had been cast as regulars in the series. The series premiered on October 15, 2021.

== Reception ==
Viewership and ratings per episode of Day of the Dead
No.	Title	Air date	Rating (18–49)	Viewers (millions)	DVR (18–49)	DVR viewers (millions)	Total (18–49)	Total viewers (millions)
1	"The Thing in the Hole"	October 15, 2021	0.06	0.277	TBD	TBD	TBD	TBD
2	"Chum"	October 22, 2021	0.05	0.216	0.04	0.156	0.09	0.372
3	"The Grey Mile"	October 29, 2021	0.03	0.184	TBD	TBD	TBD	TBD
4	"Forest of the Damned"	November 5, 2021	0.09	0.272	TBD	TBD	TBD	TBD
5	"'Til the Dead Do Us Part"	November 12, 2021	0.03	0.180	TBD	TBD	TBD	TBD
6	"The Lady Birders of Nepa"	November 19, 2021	0.06	0.221	0.02	0.135	0.08	0.356
7	"Their Evil Was Our Evil"	November 26, 2021	0.04	0.191	0.03	0.103	0.07	0.294
8	"To Anyone Who Can Hear My Voice"	December 3, 2021	0.04	0.211	TBD	TBD	TBD	TBD
9	"Death Comes to Paymart"	December 10, 2021	0.04	0.213	TBD	TBD	TBD	TBD
10	"Choke on 'Em!"	December 17, 2021	0.07	0.284	TBD	TBD	TBD	TBD

== See also ==
- List of television series based on films
