= Meegwun Fairbrother =

Canadian actor

- Occupation: Actor

Meegwun Fairbrother is an Ojibwe actor from the Grassy Narrows First Nation in Ontario, Canada. He is most noted for his role as Owen Beckbie in the television drama series Burden of Truth, for which he was a Canadian Screen Award nominee for Best Supporting Actor in a Drama Program or Series at the 10th Canadian Screen Awards in 2022. He has also appeared in the television series Mohawk Girls, Avatar: The Last Airbender, SkyMed, Murdoch Mysteries, and The Sticky, and the feature films Finality of Dusk and Seeds.

== Career ==
In 2026, he was cast in the Netflix series Little House on the Prairie.
