= Morgan Holmstrom =

Canadian actress

- Born: January 1, 1997 (age 29); Winnipeg, Canada
- Education: University of Winnipeg
- Occupation: Actress
- Years active: 2018–present
- Works: SkyMed

Morgan Holmstrom (born January 1, 1997) is a Canadian television and film actress. She stars as Crystal Highway in the medical drama SkyMed (2022-present).

== Early and personal life ==
Born in Winnipeg, she was raised in East Kildonan. She is a member of the Manitoba Métis Federation with Cree and Ojibwe descent on her paternal side and a direct lineage to prominent Métis leader Cuthbert Grant through her grandfather, and cousin status to the Riel family through her grandmother. She also has Filipina heritage. She studied medicine at the University of Winnipeg before pursuing an acting career. She later moved to Vancouver.

== Career ==
She had an early role in Keanu Reeves film Siberia in 2018, and appeared in a number of Hallmark Channel television films.

She appeared in a series lead role as Sarah Blackwood, a former Special Forces operative who finds herself in the middle of a zombie invasion, in 2021 Syfy television series Day of the Dead.

She appeared as Wahionhaweh/Emily in historical drama series Outlander in 2022. That year, she could be seen as Sâkowêw in The Shadow of the Rougarou, on the Aboriginal Peoples Television Network (APTN) streaming service. In May 2022, she was nominated at the Leo Awards for Best Performance Female - Short Drama for her role in Shadow of the Rougarou.

From 2022, she has a main role in Canadian medical drama series SkyMed as Crystal, appearing from the first series on Paramount+. After also appearing in the second season, she was confirmed as returning for the third season in 2024.

She plays Kimmy, the wife of Jamie Bowen (Tye Sheridan) in 2024 film The Order alongside Jude Law and Nicholas Hoult.

== Filmography ==
| Year | Title | Role | Notes |
|---|---|---|---|
| 2017 | The Spider | Jane | Short |
| 2017 | Snowed-Inn Christmas | Katie | Television Film |
| 2018 | Siberia | Female guest #1 | Film |
| 2018 | I Still See You | Meredith | Film |
| 2018 | Under the Autumn Moon | Ella | Television Film |
| 2018 | In Plain Sight | Devon Guzman | Television Film (uncredited) |
| 2021 | Soccer Mom Madam | Simone Stepien | Television Film |
| 2021 | Day of the Dead | Sarah Blackwood | Main cast |
| 2022 | The Shadow of the Rougarou | Sâkowêw | 6 episodes |
| 2022-2026 | Outlander | Wahionhaweh/Emily | 3 episodes |
| 2022-present | SkyMed | Crystal | Main cast |
| 2024 | The Order | Kimmy Bowen | Feature film |
| 2026 | Ancestral Beasts | Elyse | Feature film |
