= Madison Thomas =

- Born: 1991 or 1992 (age 34–35)
- Occupation: Filmmaker
- Website: www.madisonthomasfilm.com

Madison Thomas is an independent film and television writer and director from Winnipeg, Manitoba, Canada. She is most noted for her 2022 documentary film Buffy Sainte-Marie: Carry It On.

== Career ==
Thomas' debut feature film was the post-apocalyptic drama, This Is Why We Fight. She developed her second feature film, Ruthless Souls with assistance from Telefilm's Talent to Watch program. The film follows Jackie, an Ojibway artist from the North End, as she grieves the loss of her partner who died during gender reassignment surgery. Ruthless Souls played at the 2022 Reel Pride Film Festival in Winnipeg.

She has also directed episodes of the television series Taken, Burden of Truth, SkyMed and Pretty Hard Cases. She was a Canadian Screen Award nominee for Best Editorial Research at the 6th Canadian Screen Awards in 2018, for the Taken episode "Tina Fontaine".

In 2022, Thomas' documentary of Buffy Sainte-Marie, Buffy Sainte-Marie: Carry It On, premiered at the Toronto International Film Festival (TIFF). The film received an honorable mention for the Amplify Voices award at TIFF. For her work on the film, Thomas received the Directors Guild of Canada's Allan King Award for Excellence in Documentary.

Finality of Dusk, her third narrative feature film, premiered in 2023.

== Personal life ==
Thomas grew up in Winnipeg's North End. She is of Ojibwe/Saulteaux and Russian/Ukrainian heritage. She studied filmmaking at the University of Winnipeg.

== Filmography ==
=== Film ===
Year	Work	Credited as			Notes
Year	Work	Editor	Writer	Director	Notes
2013	This is Why We Fight	Yes	Yes	Yes	
2014	Seven Drinks	No	No	Yes	Short
2014	Heart Wired	No	Yes	Yes	Short
2015	The Middles	Yes	Yes	Yes	Short
2016	Hard Way Girl	Yes	No	No	Short
2016	Exposed Nerves	Yes	Yes	Yes	Short
2017	Declutter	Yes	Yes	Yes	Short
2017	Zaaswaake	No	Yes	Yes	Short
2019	Ruthless Souls	Yes	Yes	Yes	
2022	Buffy Sainte-Marie: Carry It On	No	No	Yes	
2023	Finality of Dusk	No	Yes	Yes	

=== Television ===
Year	Work	Credited as			Notes
Year	Work	Editor	Writer	Director	Notes
2017	Orange Daisy Project	Yes	Yes	Yes	2 episodes
2018	Colour of Scar Tissue	Yes	Yes	Yes	4 episodes
2016–2019	Taken	Yes	No	Yes	Directed 4 episodes, edited 11 episodes
2020	Amplify	No	Yes	Yes	Episode: "Enfolding"
2020	Voices From Here	Yes	No	No	3 episodes
2021	Burden of Truth	No	Yes	Yes	Wrote 1 episode, directed 2 episodes
2021	Wolf Joe	No	Yes	No	5 episodes
2022	SkyMed	No	No	Yes	2 episodes
2022–2023	Pretty Hard Cases	No	No	Yes	3 episodes
