= Bernard Starlight =

Canadian actor

Bernard Starlight is a Native Canadian actor. He is most noted for his performance as Huey Bigstone in the film Hank Williams First Nation, for which he garnered a Genie Award nomination for Best Supporting Actor at the 26th Genie Awards, and for his regular supporting role as David "Jumbo" Tailfeathers in the television series Blackstone.

He is based in Calgary, Alberta, where he is also a stage actor.
