= Imajyn Cardinal =

Cree actress

Imajyn Cardinal is a Cree actress from Calgary, Alberta, Canada. She is most noted for her leading role in the 2015 film The Saver, for which she won the award for Best Actress at the 2016 American Indian Film Festival and was nominated for the Chlotrudis Award for Best Actress in 2017.

In 2024, she received a Canadian Screen Award nomination for Best Performance in a Guest Role in a Drama Series at the 12th Canadian Screen Awards, for her supporting role as Dora in Little Bird.

She is the daughter of actress Michelle Thrush.
