= Skindigenous =

Skindigenous is a Canadian documentary television series, which premiered on APTN in 2018. The series profiles the role of tattooing in various indigenous cultures around the world.

The series was narrated by Candy Palmater. Directors of the series included Randy Kelly, Kim O'Bomsawin, Roxann Whitebean, Sonia Bonspille Boileau, Jason Brennan, and Courtney Montour.

Patrick Kaplin received a Canadian Screen Award nomination for Best Photography in a Documentary Program or Series at the 7th Canadian Screen Awards in 2019 for the first-season episode "Indonesia", and the series was nominated for Best Biography or Arts Documentary Program or Series at the 11th Canadian Screen Awards in 2023 for the third season.
