= Steven Cree Molison =

Canadian actor

Steven Cree Molison is a Canadian actor. He is most noted for his role as Daryl in the television series Blackstone, for which he was a Canadian Screen Award nominee for Best Actor in a Continuing Leading Dramatic Role at the 1st Canadian Screen Awards in 2013.

Born in British Columbia to Scottish and Cree parents, Molison was placed for adoption and raised by a Caucasian family who moved to various locations in British Columbia, Yukon and the Northwest Territories. He briefly tried to pursue acting in his youth, but was not successful at that time, and worked as a carpenter in Prince George until he was hit by a drunk driver in a road accident in 1997. While recovering from his injuries he began working in the film industry on the set of the 2000 film Reindeer Games, initially in odd jobs such as washing cars and serving as a bodyguard for Gary Sinise, before being invited to perform some stunt work in the film. He also did some stunt work for the television series Los Luchadores and UC: Undercover and the film Chilly Dogs, and then started getting cast in small on-screen acting roles after graduating from the Vancouver Institute of Media Arts's William B. Davis School of Acting.

He has also appeared in the television series Da Vinci's Inquest, Strange Empire, Motive and Cardinal, and the films Brokeback Mountain, Fifty Shades of Grey, Afghan Knights, Never Steady, Never Still and Red Snow.

In addition to his Canadian Screen Award nomination, Molison won a Leo Award for Best Actor in a Drama Series in 2012.
