= Big Eden =

2000 film by Thomas Bezucha

- Theatrical release poster
- Directed by: Thomas Bezucha
- Written by: Thomas Bezucha
- Produced by: Jennifer Chaiken
- Starring: Arye Gross; Eric Schweig; Tim DeKay; Louise Fletcher; Corinne Bohrer
- Cinematography: Rob Sweeney
- Edited by: Andrew London
- Music by: Joseph Conlan
- Production company: Chaiken Films
- Distributed by: Wolfe Video
- Release date: June 1, 2001
- Running time: 117 minutes
- Country: United States
- Language: English
- Box office: $512,451

Big Eden is a 2000 romantic comedy-drama film written and directed by Thomas Bezucha. Arye Gross stars as Henry Hart, a successful gay artist from New York City who returns to his rural hometown in Montana to care for his ailing grandfather. Henry is welcomed back by the townsfolk, all of whom are aware of his sexuality and are highly accepting and even supportive towards him (the film's plot and dialogue is notably devoid of homophobic content). During the months he stays in the town, Henry is forced to confront his unresolved feelings for his high school friend Dean Stewart (Tim DeKay), while simultaneously being oblivious to the feelings of Pike Dexter (Eric Schweig), the shy Native American owner of the town's general store.

The film won awards from several gay and lesbian film festivals, and was nominated for best limited release film at the GLAAD Media Awards in 2002. Except for the opening sequence, the motion picture was entirely shot in Montana.

== Plot ==
In June 2000, Henry Hart, a gay man and successful artist living in New York, receives a call from his old friend Grace Cornwell, a kindergarten teacher in his hometown, who tells him that his grandfather Sam had a stroke. Although his assistant, Mary Margaret Bishop, wants him to stay, Henry feels himself bound to visit and help his ailing grandfather. He jumps on the next plane to his hometown, Big Eden, Montana, giving up his new home and career. Stranded in his place of birth, Henry is confronted by the changes of time. Though Sam is recuperating, Henry feels that he should stay with his helpless grandfather because he fears becoming an orphan. While accompanying Sam to church every Sunday, he involuntarily becomes part of the town life and gossip again. The townfolks somehow always knew about his sexuality, but never mentioned it publicly. Further complicating the situation is the presence of his former high school crush Dean Stewart. Dean has just split up from his wife and has returned to Big Eden with his children Ben and Andrew. This leaves Henry trying to work out his unresolved feelings for Dean.

Grace sets up a support system for Henry and Sam. Included is Widow Thayer and Pike Dexter, a shy Native American man. Pike is the town's general-store owner, and the Widow Thayer is the center of gossip and society in Big Eden. She attempts to hook up Henry with different people; first women, but after a few "social gatherings" she realizes her error and invites men instead. While all this is going on, the Widow Thayer cooks for grandfather and grandson daily, and Pike takes it over to their house and helps by setting the table. After a few weeks Pike realizes that the food is inappropriate and learns how to cook healthy dishes. He keeps this secret, telling neither the Harts nor Thayer, exchanging Thayer's dinner with his own delicious meals. He also orders the supplies Henry needs to continue painting in Big Eden. Pike, who wants "things to be nice for Henry", has obviously fallen in love with him, too.

Meanwhile, Dean is around Henry a lot, helping him build a ramp for Sam's wheelchair, and taking Henry dancing and to the mountains. With all of his effort, he tries to show Henry his affection and feelings, but Dean eventually tells Henry that he couldn't live together with him. Sam comforts a forlorn Henry, insinuating he knows about his sexuality and accepts him.

Time passes and Sam becomes worse. One night, Henry arrives home and finds Pike there, looking forlorn. Pike tells Henry that Sam has died. The town falls into mourning at Sam's death. He built every house in town and was closely connected to everyone. Though Dean comforts Henry, Pike secludes himself. A funeral is held for Sam, which everyone but Pike attends.

Henry, now completely alone, realizes that Pike meant something to him. Pike had shared a "promised dinner together" with him one night where he fascinated Henry with his knowledge of stars and mystical stories. That upsets Henry even more because he thought Sam meant something to Pike, too. They don't talk to each other until the day Henry leaves for New York. At the very last minute, Pike accepts his love for Henry and tries to catch him at the airport, but he is too late. On his way home, Pike sees Sam's truck in front of his store, not expecting Henry to be waiting for him. The two men become a happy couple.

== Cast and roles ==
Cast	Role
Arye Gross	Henry Hart
Eric Schweig	Pike Dexter
Tim DeKay	Dean Stewart
Louise Fletcher	Grace Cornwell
Corinne Bohrer	Anna Rudolph
George Coe	Sam Hart
Nan Martin	Widow Esther Thayer
Veanne Cox	Mary Margaret Bishop
O'Neal Compton	Jim Soams

== Production ==
The film was shot in Montana, mostly in and near Glacier National Park. The schoolhouse is in West Glacier, and the Big Eden houses are on the shore of Lake McDonald. Pike's general store is a building located in Swan Lake, Montana.

== Reception ==
Big Eden received mixed reviews. On Rotten Tomatoes, it holds a 64% rating based on reviews from 53 critics, with an average rating of 6.4/10. The consensus states: "Though unrealistic, Big Eden has all the charm and sweetness of a fairy tale." On Metacritic, which uses an average of critics' reviews, the film has a score of 59 out of 100 based on reviews from 19 critics, indicating "mixed or average" reviews.

David Ehrenstein from New Times LA wrote "Has all the crowd-pleasing elements moviegoers respond to: appealing hero, absorbing story, a solid group of supporting players and a big fat happy ending." Elizabeth Weitzman from New York Daily News commented "Director Bezucha's eyes are as starry as Montana's sky, but it's pretty hard to resist such a determinedly utopian vision of love." Carla Meyer from San Francisco Chronicle wrote "It's unlikely that the whole cowboy town would really applaud all the queer goings-on, but it's a lovely sentiment in a lovely movie."

=== Awards ===
The film received awards and nominations from a number of independent film festivals, including a nomination for best limited release film at the GLAAD Media Awards in 2002.

- 2000 L.A. Outfest: Audience Award - Outstanding Narrative Feature; Grand Jury Award - Outstanding Actor in a Feature Film: Eric Schweig
- 2000 San Francisco International Lesbian & Gay Film Festival: Audience Award - Best Feature
- 2000 Seattle Lesbian & Gay Film Festival: Audience Award - Favorite Narrative Feature
- 2000 Cleveland International Film Festival: Best American Independent Feature Film; Best Film
- 2001 Florida Film Festival: Audience Award - Best Narrative Feature
- 2001 Miami Gay and Lesbian Film Festival: Jury Award - Best Fiction Feature
- 2001 Toronto Inside Out Lesbian and Gay Film and Video Festival: Audience Award - Best Feature Film or Video

== Soundtrack ==
The film combines both classic and contemporary country songs, though there was no commercially released soundtrack. Tracks featured in the film are:

Soundtrack
George Jones	"Don't Let the Stars Get in Your Eyes" (from the 1964 United Artists album 'The Race Is On')
Dwight Yoakam	"A Thousand Miles from Nowhere" (1993 Reprise/Warner Bros.)
Buck Owens	"Together Again" (1965 Capitol)
Jim Reeves	"Welcome to My World" (1963 RCA Victor)
Skeeter Davis	"Optimistic" (1961 RCA Victor)
Lucinda Williams	"Something About What Happens When We Talk" (from her 1993 album 'Sweet Old World')
George Jones	"Achin', Breakin' Heart" (1962 Mercury)
David Allan Coe	"A Sad Country Song" (1974 Epic/CBS)
Lari White	"Wishes" (from her 1994 RCA album "Wishes')
Dwight Yoakam and Patty Loveless	"Send a Message to My Heart" (1992 Reprise/Warner Bros.)

In addition to these tracks that are or were commercially available, the film features two performances by a group called Railroad Earth. Actress Louise Fletcher also performs 'Take Me in Your Arms and Hold Me' which was originally recorded by Eddy Arnold in 1949. Fletcher also sings the contemporary mourning ballad, Linger in Blissful Repose at Sam's funeral. The film's original score was composed by Joseph Conlan.
