= E. M. Roach =

Trinidadian writer (1915–1974)

Eric Merton Roach (3 November 1915 – 18 April 1974) was a Tobagonian poet and playwright. He published some early writing under the pseudonym Merton Maloney.

== Life ==
Roach grew up in Mount Pleasant, Tobago:

My village, Mount Pleasant, was a sprawling bushy compound of crude wattle or clapboard cabins with thatched or tin roofs, shabby like ourselves. In later years it seemed to me that in my boyhood we were clinging to life by the skin of our teeth and did not realise our hardship because we knew nothing else.

Between 1949 and 1955, his poetry was frequently broadcast on the BBC programme Caribbean Voices.

In 1960s, Roach began to gain an international reputation. However, he became overwhelmed and depressed, and committed suicide in 1974, drinking insecticide before swimming in the ocean.

Ksenia Kharlamova, Canadian actress and model of Russian and Trini heritage, claims Eric Merton Roach as her grandfather, paying tribute to him in an Instagram post.

== Work ==
=== Plays ===
- Belle Fanto: A Medium-length Play in 3 Acts, 1967
- Letter from Leonora, 1968
- A Calabash of Blood (a Full-length Play in 3 acts), 1971
- New Dancers in the Dooryard (undated)

=== Poems ===
- The Flowering Rock: Collected Poems 1938–1974, Peepal Tree Press, 1992

== Plays: performance history ==
=== Belle Fanto ===
Trinidad and Tobago Secondary Schools Drama Festival

- 1971: St. George's College (Trinidad and Tobago) directed by Slade Hopkinson.
- 1973: Palo Seco Government Secondary (Trinidad and Tobago) directed by B.T. Harry.
- 1982: Cowen Hamilton Secondary (Trinidad and Tobago) directed by Victor Edwards.
- 1988: San Fernando West Senior Comprehensive (Trinidad and Tobago) directed by Garvin McClean.
- 1989: Signal Hill Senior Comprehensive School (Trinidad and Tobago) directed by Cherryll Uzoruo.
- 1992: Aranguez Junior Secondary School (Trinidad and Tobago) directed by Susan Crichlow.
- 1993: Signal Hill Senior Comprehensive School (Trinidad and Tobago) directed by Cherryll Uzoruo.
- 1997: St. George's College (Trinidad and Tobago) directed by Rawle Carrington.
- 1999: Tranquillity Government Secondary (Trinidad and Tobago) directed by Karen Griffith.
- 2002: Cowen Hamilton Secondary School (Trinidad and Tobago) directed by Iezora Edwards.

Theatre companies The following theatre companies performed Belle Fanto:

- San Fernando Theatre Workshop, directed by James Lee Wah
- Trinidad Theatre Workshop, directed by Derek Walcott
- The Tobago Drama Guild, directed by Peter Wheeler Thabiti

=== A Calabash of Blood ===
- 2019: The University of the West Indies, Department of Creative and Festival Arts, directed by Neriah Alfred
- 2021: The Tobago Drama Guild, directed by Peter Wheeler Thabiti
- 2023: The Tobago Drama Guild, directed by Peter Wheeler Thabiti
