= Ron E. Scott =

Filmmaker (b. 1967)

- Born: December 7, 1967 (age 58); Edmonton, Alberta, Canada
- Education: Vancouver Film School
- Occupations: Director, executive producer, writer
- Years active: 1995–present

Ron E. Scott (born December 7, 1967) is a Canadian-Metis showrunner and director. He is the founder of Prairie Dog Film + Television, an independent production company involved in creating scripted series. Company projects have been nominated for over 140 awards, including Best Dramatic Series and Best Dramatic Writing at the Canadian Screen Awards.

Scott is best known for Blackstone, Mixed Blessings and the one-hour procedural dramatic series Tribal.

== Early life ==
Scott was born to a Metis-Cree family in Edmonton, Alberta. Drawing from his childhood background, Scott grew up in a dysfunctional, part-native, part-white world that influenced his work. He found storytelling and cinema as an outlet: "The language of cinema from an early age and my challenging childhood helped me speak into different aspects", and "My childhood and earlier adult years were filled with stories and experiences that prepared me."

He graduated from Vancouver Film School in 1993.

== Career ==
Scott founded Prairie Dog Film + Television. In 1995, Scott's first feature film, Rubber Man, aired at the Cannes Film Market, Europe Cable and Superchannel.

Cowboy Country, a lifestyle television series, credited Scott as producer, director and writer. It celebrates century and heritage ranches, educating the public about famous and legendary characters of the west, and investigating their cuisine and craftsmanship. Cowboy Country's four seasons were 91 half-hour episodes broadcast on APTN HD, CHUM, ACCESS, CLT and BookTelevision.

Scott produced, directed and wrote lifestyle television series My Green House, which consisted of 13 half-hour episodes broadcast on CHUM, ACCESS, CLT, and BookTelevision.

In 2007 Scott entered the half-hour dramatic comedy genre with Mixed Blessings - The Series, as executive producer and director. Mixed Blessings aired for three seasons on APTN with a total of 26 episodes.

In 2009, Scott released the one-hour tragic series Blackstone, an exploration of community, power, and politics on a First Nation reserve. Scott served as the creator, showrunner, and director during its five-season run.

In 2019, Scott started production as the showrunner on a new one-hour dramatic series, Tribal. The show premiered on APTN on Thursday, February 20, 2020. As of February 2020 the show was officially confirmed for a second season.

== Filmography ==
=== Film ===
Year	Title	Credited as			Notes
Year	Title	Director	Writer	Producer	Notes
1995	Rubber Man	Yes	Yes	Yes	Feature Film
1998	Consequences	Yes	Yes	Yes	Short Film
2005	Little White Lies		Yes	Yes	TV movie

=== Television ===
Year	Title	Credited as			Notes
Year	Title	Director	Writer	Producer	Notes
2007-2008	Cowboy Country			Yes	First 4 seasons
2007	My Green House		Yes	Yes	Executive producer: (13 episodes), Writer (13 episodes)
2009	Cashing In			Yes	Producer (3 episodes)
2007-2010	Mixed Blessings	Yes	Yes	Yes	Co-Creator: Executive Producer (21 episodes), Story (16 episodes), Director (1 episode)
2009-2015	Blackstone	Yes	Yes	Yes	Creator: Executive Producer, (39 episodes), Director (39 episodes), Writer (17 episodes)
2020	Tribal	Yes	Yes	Yes	Creator: Executive Producer, (8 episodes), Director (8 episodes), Writer (8 episodes)

== Awards ==
Scott has also won multiple awards for his directing and screenwriting, including a Gemini for his art direction for main title design, multiple AMPIA awards and the prestigious Queen's Diamond Jubilee Medal for his contributions to the Canadian Arts scene.

== Accolades ==
Year	Ceremony	Category	Nominated work	Result
1998	Alberta Film and Television Awards	Best Director	Consequences	Won
1998	Alberta Film and Television Awards	Best Short Film	Consequences	Won
2012	Leo Awards	Best Dramatic Series	Blackstone	Won
2012	Alberta Film and Television Awards	Best Screenwriter (drama over 30 minutes)	Blackstone	Won
2014	Alberta Film and Television Awards	Best Screenwriter (drama over 30 minutes)	Blackstone	Won
2014	Alberta Film and Television Awards	Best Director (drama over 30 minutes)	Blackstone	Won
2014	Canadian Screen Awards	Best Dramatic Series	Blackstone	Nominated
2015	Alberta Film and Television Awards	Best Director (drama over 30 minutes)	Blackstone	Won
2016	Canadian Screen Awards	Best Dramatic Series	Blackstone	Nominated
