= Taken (2016 TV series) =

Canadian true crime documentary TV series

- Genre: True crime documentary
- Created by: Lisa Meeches, Kyle Irving, Rebecca Gibson
- Presented by: Lisa Meeches, George Muswaggon
- Narrated by: Lisa Meeches, George Muswaggon
- Opening theme: "New Women Song" ft. Jennifer Kreisberg by Cris Derksen
- Composer: Justin Delorme
- Country of origin: Canada
- Original language: English
- No. of seasons: 3
- No. of episodes: 39

Production
- Executive producers: Lisa Meeches, Kyle Irving, Rebecca Gibson
- Running time: 30 minutes
- Production company: Eagle Vision

Original release
- Network: Aboriginal People's Television Network, CBC
- Release: September 9, 2016 – Present

Taken is a Canadian true crime documentary television series produced by Winnipeg-based production company Eagle Vision. It first aired on the Aboriginal People’s Television Network on September 9, 2016 and was broadcast again later that year by CBC Television. The series features reenactments and interviews with the family and friends of Canada's Missing and Murdered Indigenous Women and Girls, as well as interviews with local and federal law enforcement, various Canadian experts, advocates, activists and politicians who provide social commentary on the issue of MMIWG in Canada. The series also encourages viewers with information about the featured cases to call the RCMP or Canadian Crime Stoppers anonymous toll-free tip line at 1-800-222-8477. The series was created by Lisa Meeches, Kyle Irving and Rebecca Gibson and is broadcast in both English with host Lisa Meeches, and in Cree by host George Muswaggon. There are currently 3 seasons of Taken, with a fourth and final season in development.

== Episodes ==
=== Season 1 (2016) ===
Episode	Case(s)	Interview Subjects	Writer/Director	Original Air Date
1. Tina Fontaine	Tina Fontaine	Thelma Favel (great aunt), Sergeant John O’Donovan (Winnipeg Police) Cindy Guimonde (guidance councillor), Nahanni Fontaine (Special Advisor on Aboriginal Women’s Issues for the Indigenous Issues Committee of Cabinet for Manitoba), Mary Wilson (Spiritual Advisor), the Honourable Jody Wilson-Raybould (Minister of Justice, and Canada’s Attorney General), Craig Benjamin (Amnesty	Writer: Jacquie Black Director: Cam Bennett	September 9, 2016
2. Highway of Tears	Alberta Williams, Ramona Wilson	Claudia Williams (sister), Ray Michalko (private investigator) Wayne Clary (Head of E-Pana), Angela Marie MacDougall (Executive Director at Battered Women’s Support Services, BC), Craig Benjamin (Amnesty International), Matilda Wilson (mother) Brenda Wilson (sister) Chief Terry Teegee (cousin)	Writer: Jacquie Black Director: Cam Bennett	September 16, 2016
3. Downtown East Side	Danielle LaRue, Ashley Machiskinic	Kim LaRue (sister), Evelyn Dick (grandmother) Robert Dick (grandfather), Mona Woodward (cousin) Dave Dickson (outreach worker, friend)	Writer: Jacquie Black Director: Cam Bennett	September 23, 2016
4. Marie Jeanne Kreiser	Marie Jeanne Kreiser	Lorna Martin (daughter), Gail Leech (daughter), Sharon Patterson (daughter) Arlene Pearson (daughter) Murray Marcichiw (RCMP Staff Sergeant), Jody Stonehouse (Researcher, University of Alberta, Faculty of Native Studies), Liza Sunley (Executive Director, Lurana Shelter)	Writer: Rebecca Gibson Directors: Lisa Meeches, Richard Duffy	September 30, 2016
5. Emily Osmond	Emily Osmond	Myrna LaPlante (niece) Jessica LaPlante (great niece), April Buffalo-Robe (niece), Lloyd Goodwill (retired RCMP)	Writer: Rebecca Gibson Director: Rebecca Gibson	October 7, 2016
6. Cherisse Houle	Cherisse Houle	Barb Houle (mother) Jessica Houle (sister), Linda English (foster parent), Shawn Pike (Project Devote)	Writer: Jacquie Black Directors: Lisa Meeches, Reil Munro	October 14, 2016
7. Amber Guiboche	Amber Guiboche	Kyle Kematch (brother), Ashley Geddes (sister), Detective Sergeant Shaunna Neufeld (Winnipeg Police)	Writer: Jacquie Black Directors: Madison Thomas, Reil Munro	October 21, 2016
8. Claudette Osborne-Tyo	Claudette Osborne-Tyo	Bernadette Smith (sister), Shawn Pike (Project Devote), Matthew Bushby (children’s father) Bob Chrismas (former Winnipeg Police)	Writer: Rebecca Gibson Director: Lisa Meeches	October 28, 2016
9. Fonassa Bruyere	Fonassa Bruyere	Janet Bruyere (grandmother), Crystal Bruyere (cousin), Rob Lasson (Project Devote), Nahanni Fontaine (Special Advisor on Aboriginal Women’s Issues)	Writer: Rebecca Gibson Director: Rebecca Gibson	November 4, 2016
10. Tanya Nepinak	Tanya Nepinak	Sue Caribou (aunt), Sergeant John O’Donovan (Winnipeg Police), Vernon Mann (children’s father)	Writer: Rebecca Gibson Director: Ervin Chartrand	November 11, 2016
11. Sandra Johnson	Sandra Johnson	Sharon Johnson (sister), EJ Kwandibens (friend), Grand Chief Anna Betty Achneepineskum, Andrew Hay (police)	Writer: Rebecca Gibson Director: Jacquie Black	November 18, 2016
12. Maisy Odjick, Shannon Alexander	Maisy Odjick, Shannon Alexander	Laurie Odjick (mother), Earl McGregor (grandfather), Maria Jacko (aunt), Damon Jacko (brother), Gordon McGregor (Director Kitigan Zibi Band Police), Claudette Commanda (Kitigan Zibi Band Council), Bryan Alexander, (father), Heather Crank (niece), Juanita Alexander (aunt), Jody Wilson Raybould (Minister of Justice), Caroline Bennett (Minister of Indigenous Affairs)	Writer: Jacquie Black Director: Danielle Sturk	November 25, 2016
13. Tanya Brooks	Tanya Brooks	Vanessa Brooks (sister), CJ Brooks (child), Cheryl Melony (Women’s Shelter worker), Jason Withrow (police)	Writer: Jacquie Black Director: Noam Gonick	December 2, 2016

=== Season 2 (2017) ===
Episode	Case(s)	Interview Subjects	Writer/Director	Original Air Date
1. Hilary; Wilson	Hilary Wilson	Dwayne Balfour (Hillary’s Uncle), Staff Sergeant Jared Hall (Project Devote), Jennifer Richardson (Child Exploitation Specialist), Diane Redsky (Executive Director of Ma Mawi Wi Chi Itata Centre), the Honourable Patty Hajdu (Minister of Status of Women), and featuring Claudette Commanda.	Writer: Rebecca Gibson Director: Rebcca Gibson, Lisa Meeches	September 8, 2017
2.Cheyenne Fox	Cheyenne Fox	Michelle Atkinson (Cheyenne’s Mother), John Fox Sr. (Cheyenne’s Father), John Fox, Jr. (Cheyenne’s Brother), Wab Kinew (Author, Politician).	Writer: Jacquie Black Director: Rebecca Gibson	September 15, 2017
3. Gladys; Simon	Gladys Simon	Andrea Colfer (Gladys’ Sister), Leona Simon (Gladys’ Niece), Robert Levy (Gladys’ Friend), Patty Musgrave (Student Advisor, Advocate), Wab Kinew (author, politician).	Writer: Rebecca Gibson Director: Cam Benett	September 22, 2017
4. Glenda; Morrisseau	Glenda Morrisseau	Doreen Morrisseau (Glenda’s Sister), Calvin Alexander (Glenda’s Cousin), Rebecca Chartrand (Glenda’s Friend), Sergeant Shawn Pike (Project Devote), Diane Redsky (Executive Director of Ma Mawi Wi Chi Itata Centre).	Writer: Rebecca Gibson Director: Rebecca Gibson	September 29, 2017
5. Kelly; Morrisseau	Kelly Morrisseau	Roxanne Morrisseau (Kelly’s Cousin), Tanis Morrisseau (Kelly’s Daughter), Deb Chansonieuve (Family Friend), Perry Bellegarde (National Chief, Assembly of First Nations), Sergeant Jean-Paul Lemay (Media Relations–Gatineau Police)	Writer: Jacquie Black Director: Tyson Caron	October 6, 2017
6. Mildred; Flett	Mildred Flett	Angeline Nelson (Mildred’s Daughter), Kathy Nelson (Mildred’s Daughter), Lynda Neckoway (Mildred’s Sister), Wesley Flett (Mildred’s Brother), Det.Sgt. Wade McDonald (Winnipeg Police), Eric Robinson (Indigenous Activist, and Former Member of the Manitoba Legislative Assembly).	Writer: Justina Neepin Director: Jenna Neepin	October 13, 2017
7. Jennifer; Catcheway	Jennifer Catcheway	Willie Starr (Jennifer’s Brother), Rhianna Acoby (Jennifer’s Friend), Monica Acoby (Jennifer’s Friend), Deidre Acoby (Jennifer’s Friend), Staff Sgt. Jared Hall (RCMP), Gladys Radek (Missing Persons Advocate).	Writer: Rebecca Gibson Director: Jacquie Black	October 20, 2017
8. Angela; Meyer	Angela Meyer	Kathy Meyer (Angela’s Mother), Dean Meyer (Angela’s Father), Byron Meyer (Angela’s Brother), Candace Meyer (Angela’s Sister), Constable Jack Keefe (Yellowknife RCMP), Mark Koltek (Child and Adolescent Psychiatrist, Manitoba Adolescent Treatment Centre).	Writer: Sonya Ballantyne Director: Madison Thomas	October 26, 2017
9. Delaine; Copenace	Delaine Copenace	Anita Copenace (Delaine’s Mother), Dayna Copenace (Delaine’s Sister), Darian Copenace (Delaine’s Sister), Lori Copenace (Delaine’s Sister), Christy Dzikowicz (Canadian Centre for Child Protection), James Favel (Bear Clan Patrol), Jessica Huzyk (Canadian Centre for Child Protection), David Lucas (OPP), Jeff Duggan (OPP).	Writer: Jacquie Black Director: Ty Caron, Lisa Meeches	November 3, 2017
10. Danita; Big Eagle	Danita Big Eagle	Dianne BigEagle (Danita’s Mother), Lisa BigEagle (Danita’s Sister), Myrna LaPlante (Iskwewuk Ewichiwitochik), Evan Bray (Chief of Police, Regina Police Service).	Writer: Jacquie Black Director: Noam Gonick	November 10, 2017
11. Felicia; Solomon	Felica Solomon	Darlene Osborne (Felicia’s Grandmother), Christie Osborne (Felicia’s Great-Aunt), Renee Carpenter (Felicia’s Friend), Tamara Osborne (Felicia’s Cousin), Sgt. Shawn Pike (Project Devote), Chief Ron Evans (Norway House Chief).	Writer: Justina Neepin Director: Jenna Neepin	November 17, 2017
12. Tamara Chipman and; Belinda Williams	Tamara Chipman and Belinda Williams	Gladys Radek (Tamara’s Aunt), Lorelei Williams (Belinda’s Niece), Staff Sgt. Wayne Clary (RCMP), Dr. Gabor Maté (Speaker, Teacher, Author), Lorimer Shenher (Author, Former Police Officer), Paul Lacerte (Co-Founder, Moose Hide Campaign), Raven Lacerte (Co-Founder, Moose Hide Campaign), Henri Chevillard (Gladys’ Friend).	Writer: Rebecca Gibson Director: Jacquie Black	November 24, 2017
13. Jacqueline Crazybull	Jacqueline Crazybull	Clifford Crowchild (Jacqueline’s Son), Sandra Manyfeathers (Jacqueline’s Sister), Lauren Crazybull (Jacqueline’s Niece), Tara Robinson (Executive Director of YouthLink Calgary Police Interpretive Centre), Michelle Robinson (Human Rights Activist), Liza Lorenzetti (Social Worker, Educator, Activist), Dr. Abbas Mancey (Alberta Men’s Network).	Writer: Rebecca Gibson Director: Ty Caron	December 1, 2017

Season 3 (2018)

Episode	Case(s)	Interview Subjects	Writer/Director	Original Air Date
1. Amber; Tuccaro	Amber Tuccaro	Vivian Tuccaro (Amber’s Mother), Paul Tuccaro Jr. (Amber’s Brother), Tracy Bear (Director for the Indigenous Women's Resilience Project), Ian Campeau (Anishinaabe Artist and Advocate)	Writer: Rebecca Gibson Director: Madison Thomas	September 27, 2018
2. Patricia Carpenter	Patricia Carpenter	Joyce Carpenter (Patricia’s Mother), Laura Heidenheim (Documentarian), Josephine Tse (Documentarian), Ivana Yellowback (Advocate and Youth Worker)	Writer: Kayla Hayden Director: Rebecca Gibson	October 5, 2018
3. Crystal Andrews and Leah Anderson	Crystal Andrews and Leah Anderson	Beverley Andrews (Crystal’s Mom), Roxanne Spence (Crystal’s Fiance’s Mom), Wayne Okenow (Leah’s Uncle), Mervin White (Crystal’s Fiance’s Dad), Leslie Spillett (Executive Director Ka Ni Kanichihk), Katherine Whitecloud (Knowledge Keeper)	Writer: Rebecca Gibson Director: Lisa Meeches	October 12, 2018
4. Leona Brule	Leona Brule	Chris Sanderson (Leona’s Cousin), Catherine Sanders (Leona’s Aunt), Cpl. Jack Keefe (RCMP), Mandee McDonald (Senior Projects Administrator for Dene Nahjo), Marie Wilson (TRC Commission of Canada, 2009 to 2005)	Writer: Jacquie Black Director: Noam Gonick	October 19, 2018
5. Janet Syvestre	Janet Syvestre	Crystal Sylvestre (Janet's Daughter), Toni Lemaigre (Janet's Sister), Lauren Sylvestre (Janet's Son), Corporal Kelly Bates (RCMP), Dr. Robert Innes (University of Saskatchewan, Department of Native Studies)	Writer: Sonia Ballantyne Director: Jacquie Black	October 26, 2018
6. Josephine Martin	Josephine Martin	Tanya Martin (Josephine’s Daughter), Wesley Martin (Josephine’s Son), Georgina Sanderson (Josephine's Niece), Margaret Sanderson (Josephine’s Sister), Marlene Grace Buck (Josephine's Sister), Cst. Mike Harris (RCMP)	Writer: Dinae Robinson Director: Rebecca Gibson	November 2, 2018
7. Lorilee Francis	Lorilee Francis	Connie Francis (Lorilee's Aunt), Lane Francis (Lorilee’s Brother), Lance Francis (Lorilee's Brother), Lisa Ferguson (Lorilee's Sister), Mary Francis (Lorilee's Grandmother), Vanessa Shannon (Lorilee’s Cousin), Edward Ferguson (Lorilee's Cousin), Danielle Allard (University of Alberta, Assistant Professor, Library and Information Studies)	Writer: Jacquie Black Director: Madison Thomas	November 9, 2018
8. Amanda Cook	Amanda Cook	Cheyenne Chartrand (Amanda's Sister), Bernadette Sumner (Amanda's Sister), Mary Cook (Amanda's Mother), Lisa Makwebak (Community Activist), Sgt. Paul Manaigre (RCMP)	Writer: Rebecca Gibson Director: Jacquie Black	November 16, 2018
9. Sindy Ruperthouse	Sindy Ruperthouse	Émilie Ruperthouse Wylde (Sindy’s Mother), Johnny Wylde (Sindy’s Father), Joan Wylde (Sindy’s Sister), Kathy Ruperthouse (Sindy’s Sister), Lt. Martine Asselin (Sûreté du Québec)	Writer: Jacquie Black Director: Jenna Neepin	November 23, 2018
10. Nicole Daniels	Nicole Daniels	Isabel Daniels (Nicole's cousin), Joan Winning (Nicole's Aunt), Sandra Delaronde (MMIWG Advocate), Dr. Lisa Kinew (Physician)	Writer: Rebecca Gibson Director: Cam Bennett	November 30, 2018
11. Cheryl Johnson	Cheryl Johnson	Patricia Johnson (Cheryl’s Mother), Lynn Johnson (Cheryl’s Sister), Tricia Johnson (Cheryl’s Sister), Shaylene Johnson (Cheryl’s Friend), Nadine Bernard (Cheryl’s Friend), Sasha Doucette (Photographer), Holly Moore (Journalist, APTN)	Writer: Rebecca Gibson Director: Sam Karney	December 7, 2018
12. Elizabeth Dorion	Elizabeth Dorion	Georgina Simms (Elizabeth’s Daughter), Karen Deborah Young (Elizabeth’s Friend), John Cochrane (Elizabeth’s Grandson), Primrose Bloomfield (Elizabeth’s Niece), Cpl. Janna Amirault (RCMP)	Writer: Rebecca Gibson Director: Rebecca Gibson	December 15, 2018
13. Caitlin Pots	Caitlin Pots	The day before her disappearance, 27-year-old Caitlin Potts was last seen at Orchard Park Mall in Kelowna, British Columbia, and an official missing persons alert appeared on March 21, 2016. Caitlin’s disappearance is being treated as a homicide. Sadly, two other young women are missing from this region. Could there be a connection? INTERVIEW SUBJECTS: Priscilla Potts (Caitlin’s Mother), Ashley Potts (Caitlin’s Sister), Jody Leon (MMIWG Advocate), Cpl. Dan Moskaluk (RCMP)	Writer: Jacquie Black Director: Tyson Caron	December 21, 2018

== Ratings ==
Season 1 of the series is estimated to have reached an average of 100,000 viewers in its initial airing, increasing to 1.4 million after its release on CBC.

== Awards and nominations ==
- Nomination: 6th Canadian Screen Awards (Factual Program or Series), (Editorial Research - Rebecca Gibson, Bernadette Smith, Madison Thomas, "Tina Fontaine")
- Winner: 2017 Accolade Global Film Competition, Award of Merit (Rebecca Gibson, Eagle Vision (Canada), TAKEN – Emily Osmond, Television – Program / Series)
- Winner: 2017 Beyond Borders ECPAT Canadian Media Awards (English Electronic: Rebecca Gibson, Kyle Irving, Lisa Meeches, Jacquie Black Taken – Cherisse Houle APTN, CBC)
