= Michelle Thrush =

Canadian actress and activist

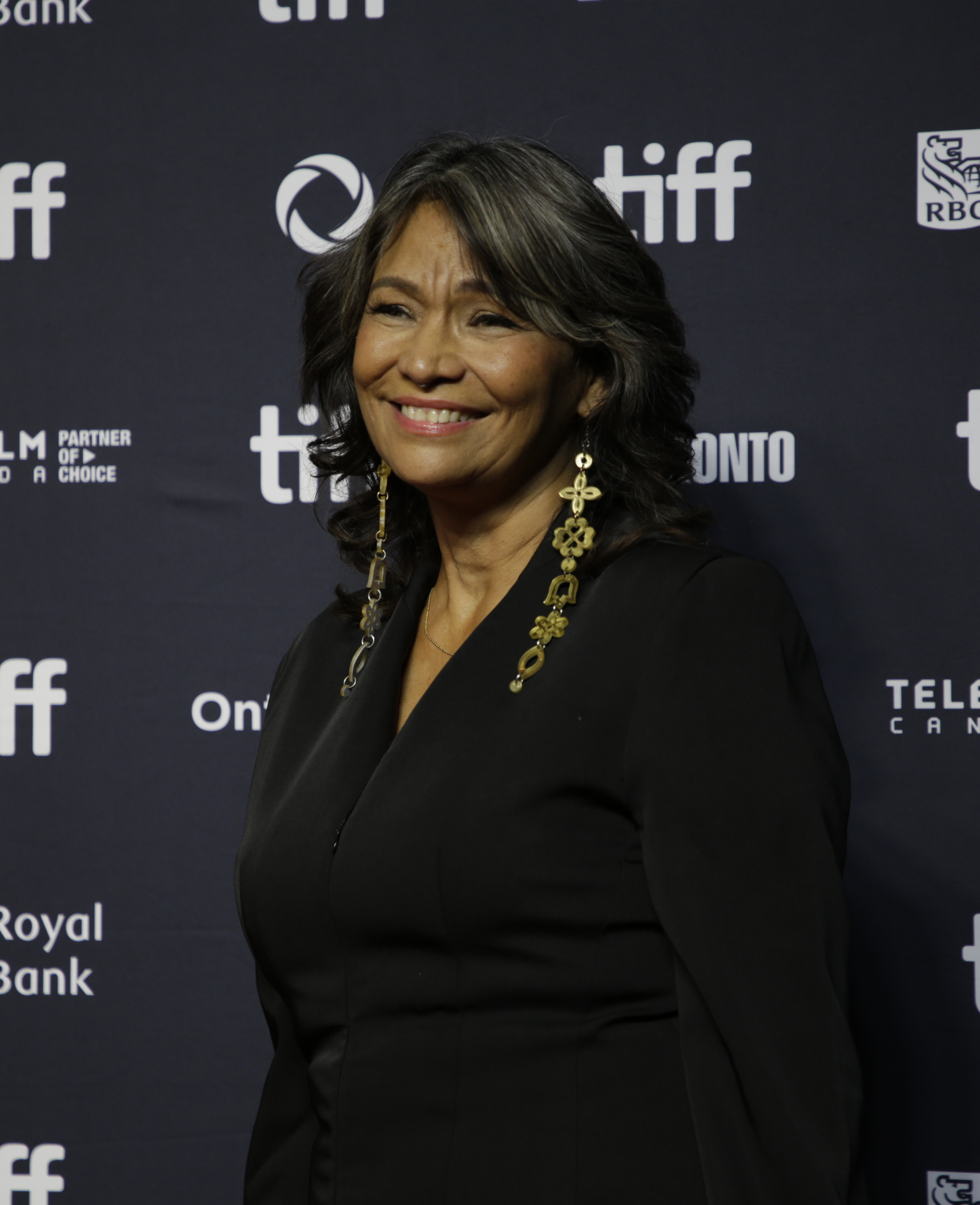
- Thrush in 2025 at TIFF.

Michelle Thrush (born February 6, 1967) is a Canadian actress and First Nations activist for Indigenous peoples in Canada and the other Indigenous peoples of the Americas. She is best known for her leading role as Gail Stoney in Blackstone, for which she won the Gemini Award for Best Performance by an Actress in a Continuing Leading Dramatic Role in 2011, and her recurring roles as Sylvie LeBret in North of 60 and Deanna Martin in Arctic Air.

Thrush starred in the Palme d'Or and César award-nominated film Jimmy P: Psychotherapy of a Plains Indian.

== Early life ==
Thrush, who is Cree, was born and raised in Calgary, Alberta, Canada, by parents who were chronic alcoholics. She recalls being called "Squaw" at Bowness High School and bullied because of her parents' illness. In grade nine, she changed schools and attended Calgary's Plains Indian Cultural Survival School, where she felt accepted for the first time. Commenting on her experience at that school, she stated: "There were other Native students there, and I learned so many wonderful things about myself, about my culture, about my language, about drumming and singing. They filled in a lot of the voids that my soul was just begging for."

Her childhood hardships affected her profoundly. Though she acted in her first film at 17, it did not occur to her it could be a career. She planned to become a social worker and help children. She met Gordon Tootoosis, a First Nations actor, who told her: "If [acting] is what your heart wants, you need to follow it and be true." At this point, her parents were sober. With no other ties to Calgary, at age 20 she moved to Vancouver and found an agent.

== Career ==
Thrush has had a prolific career since its beginning in the 1980s. She began her acting career in film while attending high school. She got her first theatre job when she moved to Vancouver at age 20. She had a small part in the play The Ecstasy of Rita Joe. She portrayed numerous recurring and guest roles in the television series Madison, Northern Exposure, North of 60, Highlander, Forever Knight, Nothing Too Good for a Cowboy, Moccasin Flats and Mixed Blessings.

She has starred in many notable films throughout her career, particularly in films that deal with issues about indigenous peoples of the Americas, ranging from Canadian Aboriginals to Native Americans/American Indians (U.S.). These include Isaac Littlefeathers, Unnatural & Accidental, Bury My Heart at Wounded Knee, Skins, Dead Man, Dreamkeeper and Jimmy P: Psychotherapy of a Plains Indian.

In 2011, Thrush wrote the one-woman play Find Your Own Inner Elder. She has performed the show, most often under the title Inner Elder, across Canada. It premiered at One Yellow Rabbit's High Performance Rodeo in Calgary in 2018 and has since been performed with Nightwood Theatre and Native Earth Performing Arts in Toronto (2019). Inner Elder is a structured monologue which recounts Thrush's personal life and experiences.

Her daughter, Imajyn Cardinal, is also an actress.

== Filmography ==
=== Television ===
Year	Title	Role	Notes
1993	Madison	Charlene	Recurring Role: 4 episodes
1993–1997	North of 60	Sylvie LeBret	Recurring role: 10 episodes
1994	Northern Exposure	Pilot	Episode: "Shofar, So Good"
1994	Highlander	Sara Lightfoot/Little Deer	Recurring: 2 episodes, two separate roles
1995	Children of the Dust	Rainbow woman	TV miniseries
1995	Forever Knight	Marian Blackwing	Episode: "Blackwing"
1997	Unwed Father	Holly	Made-for-TV movie
1997	Viper	Grey Hawk	Episode: "Wilderness Run"
1998	Ebenezer	Ghost of Christmas Past	Made-for-TV movie
1998	The Crow: Stairway to Heaven	Jane Cogo	Episode: "Before I Wake"
1999	Nothing Too Good for a Cowboy	Esther's Sister	Episode: "Sex Lies and Narrow Escapes"
2000	North of 60:Trial by Fire	Sylvia LeBret	Made-for-TV movie
2003	Dreamkeeper	Morning House	Made-for-TV movie
2003–2005	Moccasin Flats	Laura	Recurring role: 14 episodes
2007	Bury My Heart at Wounded Knee	Four Robes	HBO Made-for-TV movie
2008–2010	Mixed Blessings	Kate	Recurring role: 15 episodes
2011–2015	Blackstone	Gail Stonee	Main cast
2012	The Horses of McBride	Rhonda	Made-for-TV movie
2012–2014	Arctic Air	Deanna Martin	Recurring role: 8 episodes
2014	Fargo	Sue Roundtree	1 episode
2017-2019	Tin Star	Jaclyn Letendre	Recurring role
2018	This Blows	Driver	
2019	Molly of Denali	Shyatsoo/Aunt Merna (voice)	
2020	Tribal	Jackie Woodburn	
2023	Little Bird		TV series
2025	Meadowlarks		
2025	Do Us Part		

=== Film ===
Year	Title	Role	Notes
1984	Isaac Littlefeathers	Sally Littlefeathers	First media role
1986	The Wake	N/A	
1991	The Dark Wind	Shirley Topaha	
1991	The Legend of Kootenai Brown	Olivia D'Lonais	
1995	Dead Man	Nobody's Girlfriend	First major film role
2002	Skins	Stella	
2005	Fugitives Run	N/A	
2006	Unnatural & Accidental	Pink Girl	
2007	Pathfinder	Indian Mother	
2013	Jimmy P: Psychotherapy of a Plains Indian	Gayle Picard	
2016	Lost Face	Interpreter	
2019	Red Snow	Big Fran	
2022	Prey	Aruka	
2022	Bones of Crows	January Spears	
2024	The Birds Who Fear Death	Marilyn	

=== Theatre ===
Year	Title	Role	Notes
2018	Inner Elder	Herself	One-woman play

== Awards and nominations ==
Year	Award	Category	Work	Result	Ref.
2011	Gemini Award	Best Actress in a Drama series	Blackstone	Won	
2011	Leo Awards	Best Lead Performance by a Female in a Dramatic Series	Blackstone	Nominated	
2013	Leo Awards	Best Guest Performance by a Female in a Dramatic Series	Arctic Air	Won	
2014	Canadian Screen Award	Shaw Media Award for Best Performance by an Actress in a Continuing Leading Dramatic Role	Blackstone	Nominated	
