= Blackstone (TV series) =

Canadian drama television series

- Genre: Drama
- Created by: Ron E. Scott
- Written by: Ron E. Scott
- Directed by: Ron E. Scott
- Starring: Carmen Moore; Eric Schweig; Michelle Thrush; Roseanne Supernault; Nathaniel Arcand; Gordon Tootoosis; Steven Cree Molison; Andrea Menard; Justin Rain; Ashley Callingbull; Gary Farmer; Tantoo Cardinal; Trevor Duplessis; Cheri Maracle; Bernard Starlight; Glen Gould
- Music by: Mike Shields
- Country of origin: Canada
- Original language: English
- No. of seasons: 5
- No. of episodes: 39

Production
- Executive producer: Ron E. Scott
- Cinematography: Asaf Benny
- Running time: 44 minutes
- Production company: Prairie Dog Film + Television

Original release
- Network: APTN; Showcase
- Release: 25 January 2011 – 23 December 2015

Blackstone is a Canadian television series which aired on APTN and Showcase. Written, created, directed, and produced by Canadian producer Ron E. Scott, the series began filming its first season in 2010 in and around Edmonton, Alberta.

The series went on to have five full seasons. Season 5 started production in spring of 2015 and premiered November 3, 2015. Season 5 was the final season.

In 2015, Prairie Dog Film + Television announced a deal that had the first and second seasons of the series given a second run on CBC Television as a summer series, as well as making it available for download from iTunes.

== Premise ==
Blackstone follows the lives of Indigenous people living on the fictional Blackstone First Nations reserve. The story is told from an Indigenous Canadian point of view. The show addresses important issues that Canadian aboriginals face such as racism, poverty, suicide, addiction, alcoholism, drugs, water pollution, education, physical abuse, sexual abuse, child abuse, domestic violence, corruption, politics, crime, Missing and Murdered Indigenous Women, and foster care.

== Cast and characters ==
- Carmen Moore as Leona Stoney (seasons 1–5)
- Eric Schweig as Andy Fraser (seasons 1–5)
- Michelle Thrush as Gail Stoney (seasons 1–5)
- Steven Cree Molison as Daryl Fraser (seasons 1–5)
- Tantoo Cardinal as Wilma Stoney (recurring in season 2; regular in seasons 3–5)
- Glen Gould as Smokey Stoney (recurring in season 4; regular in season 5)
- Justin Rain as Alan Fraser (recurring season 1; regular in seasons 2–5)
- Nathaniel Arcand as Victor Merasty (seasons 1–4; guest season 5)
- Andrea Menard as Deborah "Deb"/"Debbie" Fraser (recurring seasons 1, 4; recurring seasons 2–3; guest season 5)
- Roseanne Supernault as Natalie Stoney (seasons 1-2; recurring season 4)
- Cheri Maracle as Sarah Bull (recurring season 3; regular in seasons 4–5)
- Bernard Starlight as David "Jumbo" Tailfeathers (recurring seasons 1–3; regular seasons 4–5)
- Ray G. Thunderchild as Tom Fraser
- Julian Black Antelope as Darrien Tailfeathers
- Trevor Duplessis as Greg Nepoose (recurring seasons 1–2; regular seasons 3–5)
- John Cassini as Detective Platt
- Jessica Matten as Gina
- Jennifer Podemski as Dr. Louise Crowshoe
- Ashley Callingbull as Sheila Delaronde (recurring seasons 1, 5; regular seasons 2–3)
- Gordon Tootoosis as Cecil Delaronde (regular in season 1)

== Notable Guest Stars ==
- Brett Dier as Jake (season 2, episode 6: "Forgiveness")
- Mark Meer as Policeman (season 5, episode 2: "Super Dad")
- MacKenzie Porter as Brianne

== Episodes ==
Season	Episodes	Originally released	
Season	Episodes	First released	Last released
1	9	January 25, 2011	March 22, 2011
2	8	January 11, 2012	February 29, 2012
3	6	September 25, 2013	October 30, 2013
4	8	November 11, 2014	December 30, 2014
5	8	November 3, 2015	December 23, 2015

=== Season 1 (2011) ===
No. overall	No. in season	Title	Directed by	Written by	Original release date
1	1	"Future? What Future?"	Ron E. Scott	Gil Cardinal	25 January 2011
In the pilot episode, the Blackstone First Nation struggles with the disintegration of the community brought on by members' actions.
2	2	"A New Beginning"	Ron E. Scott	Story by : Ron E. Scott & Damon Vignale; Teleplay by : Ron E. Scott	1 February 2011
Newly elected Chief Leona Stoney (Carmen Moore) struggles with her role and responsibilities, while Andy Fraser (Eric Schweig) orchestrates the removal and destruction of incriminating files from his tenure as chief.
3	3	"White Bread Red Class"	Ron E. Scott	Story by : Ron E. Scott & Damon Vignale; Teleplay by : Damon Vignale	8 February 2011
Tensions rise as Leona discovers that significant funds are missing from the band's account and deals with the complications of hiring a white substitute teacher.
4	4	"Suffer The Children"	Ron E. Scott	Story by : Ron E. Scott & Damon Vignale; Teleplay by : Damon Vignale	15 February 2011
While Blackstone band members air their concerns over her leadership, Leona allows the police to investigate a child-abuse case in the community.
5	5	"Ditch Monkey"	Ron E. Scott	Story by : Ron E. Scott & Damon Vignale; Teleplay by : Gil Cardinal	22 February 2011
Leona faces both a personal and public crisis when her sister Gail Stoney (Michelle Thrush) is hospitalized because of her acute alcoholism. Andy leads a movement to unseat her as chief.
6	6	"Daddy's Home"	Ron E. Scott	Story by : Ron E. Scott & Damon Vignale; Teleplay by : Seline Williams	1 March 2011
When Andy successfully coordinates a vote to replace Leona as chief, she moves off Blackstone and pursues the conviction of Phil Henry (Stanley Isadore).
7	7	"Bingo Night"	Ron E. Scott	Story by : Ron E. Scott & Damon Vignale; Teleplay by : Ron E. Scott	8 March 2011
Leona and members of Blackstone take the stand during the trial of the sexual-abuse case.
8	8	"Push Pull Twist Turn"	Ron E. Scott	Story by : Ron E. Scott & Damon Vignale; Teleplay by : Damon Vignale	15 March 2011
Andy and brother Daryl (Steven Cree Molison) argue over money while Leona returns to Blackstone as a counselor focused on healing the community.
9	9	"Time's Up"	Ron E. Scott	Ron E. Scott & Damon Vignale	22 March 2011
Andy's world starts to unravel when he is forced out of the strip-club expansion. Leona faces opposition from some band members in her new role as counselor at the high school.

=== Season 2 (2012) ===
No. overall	No. in season	Title	Directed by	Written by	Original release date
10	1	"Blood is Thicker than Water"	Ron E. Scott	Story by : Ron E. Scott & Damon Vignale; Teleplay by : Ron E. Scott	11 January 2012
Water problems cause widespread sickness among band members and threaten to expose Andy.
11	2	"By Their Sins"	Ron E. Scott	Story by : Ron E. Scott & Damon Vignale; Teleplay by : Damon Vignale	18 January 2012
The police arrive on Andy's doorstep with questions about a missing woman, the result of tips from the strip club; meanwhile, Child Services visits Blackstone and removes a young resident.
12	3	"A Girl Walks Into a Bar"	Ron E. Scott	Story by : Ron E. Scott & Damon Vignale; Teleplay by : Ron E. Scott	25 January 2012
Gail grapples with self-control after an explosive visit to a foster home leaves her furious. Alan (Justin Rain) conceals his new job in the city.
13	4	"50/50"	Ron E. Scott	Story by : Ron E. Scott & Damon Vignale; Teleplay by : Damon Vignale	1 February 2012
Andy schools Walt Andrachuck (Mark Anderako) on business matters while Gail visits her estranged mother about Leona's illness.
14	5	"Hitchin"	Ron E. Scott	Story by : Ron E. Scott & Damon Vignale; Teleplay by : Damon Vignale	8 February 2012
Daryl takes matters into his own hands when rumors begin to threaten his business. Tracey has her day in court, but struggles to live up to her promises.
15	6	"Forgiveness"	Ron E. Scott	Story by : Ron E. Scott & Damon Vignale; Teleplay by : Penny Gummerson	15 February 2012
Alan confronts Andy about his indiscretions and Leona is visited by an unwelcome guest.
16	7	"I'm Not A Racist"	Ron E. Scott	Story by : Ron E. Scott & Damon Vignale; Teleplay by : Gil Cardinal	22 February 2012
Leona struggles to get media attention for a missing Aboriginal woman, while the dump's excavation moves forward.
17	8	"Human"	Ron E. Scott	Story by : Ron E. Scott & Damon Vignale; Teleplay by : Damon Vignale	29 February 2012
Andy faces the grim possibility of losing everything after a body is discovered during the excavation of a Blackstone dump.

=== Season 3 (2013) ===
No. overall	No. in season	Title	Directed by	Written by	Original release date
18	1	"Some Things Never Change"	Ron E. Scott	Story by : Ron E. Scott & Damon Vignale; Teleplay by : Ron E. Scott	25 September 2013
A-Plot: Andy Fraser (Eric Schweig) hits a devastating new low as his personal and professional lives disintegrate. Consumed by the guilt of his past actions and paranoid about his self-preservation, he loses his long-held stranglehold on Blackstone. Alone in his house and beaten down by stress, Andy seeks refuge at the Roxy, engaging in hollow hook-ups with strippers to mask his misery. In a desperate moment of vulnerability, he attempts to reconcile with his family. However, he is met with a united front of rejection from Debbie, Alan, Sheila, and Roberta. During the encounter, Andy picks a fight with Alan, ultimately realizing he has pushed away everyone who cared for him, Andy leaves the encounter heartbroken and more isolated than ever. B-Plot: Victor Merasty (Nathaniel Arcand) begins to strategically position himself as the new leader of the community. Recognizing the power vacuum, Victor attempts to build alliances and offer a more stable, transparent alternative to the corruption that has defined the Fraser administration. C-Plot: While Andy Fraser spirally descends into guilt and isolation, the legal consequences of his past actions fall on the innocent. Alex Henry (Jaren Brandt Bartlett) is wrongfully accused of the murder of Angel, the stripper at the Roxy whom Andy actually shot to death. In a highly public and traumatic moment for the community, Alex is arrested at the school.
19	2	""Bull in a China Shop"	Ron E. Scott	Story by : Ron E. Scott & Damon Vignale; Teleplay by : Damon Vignale	2 October 2013
A-Plot:The return of Sarah Bull (Cheri Maracle), sister of the late Tracy, creates a major crisis for the Stoney family as she aggressively pursues custody of Tracy’s daughter, Wendy. Her "tempestuous" arrival threatens the stability of Leona (Carmen Moore) and Gail (Michelle Thrush), who have been caring for the child.To establish her presence on the reserve, Sarah seduces Andy Fraser (Eric Schweig), manipulating him into bypassing housing regulations to secure her a home. Her arrival leads to a volatile confrontation with Gail and a physical altercation with Marilyn (Valerie Planche) as Sarah uses intimidation to assert her dominance. The situation escalates further when Darien Tailfeathers (Julian Black Antelope) returns and confronts Sarah, adding another layer of danger to her stay on Blackstone B-Plot: Alan (Justin Rain) and Sheila (Ashley Callingbull) attempt to provide stability by hosting a formal dinner for Debbie (Andrea Menard) as she navigates her bitter separation from Andy. The evening becomes strained by Debbie’s fragile mental state and the shadow of the Fraser family legacy. When Sheila tries to offer perspective by mentioning she "gets by" despite the death of her mushom (grandfather), Alan dismisses her strength, remarking that "Not everybody is as amazing as you." Offended by his sarcasm, Sheila falls silent, while a distracted Alan abruptly shifts the focus back to Debbie, highlighting his own inability to handle the emotional weight of the evening. C-Plot: Simultaneously, a legal battle unfolds as Alex Henry (Jaren Brandt Bartlett) is wrongfully imprisoned for a crime he did not commit. Despite her exhaustion from the custody battle and her duties as Chief, Leona dedicates herself to navigating the justice system to prove Alex's innocence and secure his release from jail. D-Plot: Seeking to pull his son away from his studies and Sheila’s (Ashley Callingbull) influence, Andy (Eric Schweig) meets with Alan’s friend, Harley (Jesse Wheeler), at the Roxy. Harley expresses interest in taking Alan out for a "guys' night," complaining that Sheila has her "meat hooks" into him. Andy encourages the idea, noting that while Alan ignores his own advice to take a break—often laughing off the suggestion and returning to his notes—he might listen to a friend. Andy offers to bankroll the night under the strict condition that their arrangement remains between the two and a secret from Alan, further driving a wedge between his son and his domestic life.
20	3	"Reap What You Sow"	Ron E. Scott	Story by : Ron E. Scott & Damon Vignale; Teleplay by : Ron E. Scott	9 October 2013
A-Plot: A violent confrontation rocks the Blackstone reserve when Phil Henry (Stanley Isadore), recently released from prison for child abuse, returns to the community. Tim Henry (Soo-Wo Gabriel), one of Phil’s former victims, is overcome by trauma and the fear that Phil will target his younger brother, Joey. In an act of desperate retribution, Tim shoots and kills Phil.The community is immediately polarized by the death: while some view it as a heinous act of violence, others see it as a necessary, if brutal, form of justice against a predator the legal system failed to stop. Seeking to protect Tim and avoid further police scrutiny on the reserve, Andy Fraser (Eric Schweig) takes the teenager into the city, helping him escape the crime scene before investigators can close in. B-Plot: Meanwhile, the Stoney family struggles to maintain order as the cycle of violence threatens to destabilize the community's fragile peace.
21	4	"Never Gonna Stop"	Ron E. Scott	Story by : Ron E. Scott & Damon Vignale; Teleplay by : Damon Vignale	16 October 2013
A-Plot: Following his dangerous involvement with organized crime in the city, Daryl Fraser (Steven Cree Molison) faces violent consequences at the hands of the Russian mafia. His attempts to navigate the criminal underworld backfire, leading to a brutal physical toll that threatens both his life and his position in the community. B-Plot: The Stoney family's stability is pushed to a breaking point as Sarah Bull (Cheri Maracle) and her volatile partner Darien Tailfeathers (Julian Black Antelope) escalate their campaign for custody of Wendy. Leona (Carmen Moore) and Gail (Michelle Thrush) face direct intimidation from the couple, who use aggressive tactics to assert their "right" to the child. The conflict reaches a violent peak when Darien physically attacks and threatens Leona, forcing the sisters into a high-stakes confrontation and leaving the community on edge as the legal and personal battle for Wendy intensifies. C-Plot: Roberta (Tinsel Korey) takes Debbie (Andrea Menard) out for a "girls' night" to help her cope with the stress of her separation from Andy. During the night out, a confident Debbie performs on stage and later encounters Dr. Kurt Ellis (Cameron Bancroft). Deciding to pursue a hook-up, Debbie and Ellis return to Roberta’s house, where Debbie has been staying temporarily since leaving Andy. The two sleep together, marking a significant step in Debbie's attempt to move on from her marriage. D-Plot: Following the secret deal made at the Roxy, Harley (Jesse Wheeler) takes Alan (Justin Rain) and a friend out for a night in the city. To facilitate the outing, Alan lies to Sheila (Ashley Callingbull), claiming he is attending a night class when he is actually at the Roxy. While the evening initially provides Alan a reprieve from his academic stress, the mood shifts when a guilt-ridden Harley confesses that the night was orchestrated and funded by Andy (Eric Schweig). This revelation leaves Alan feeling betrayed, realizing that his father is still manipulating his social life and domestic stability despite him living away from home.
22	5	"Still My Kid"	Ron E. Scott	Jason Long, Ron E. Scott & Damon Vignale	23 October 2013
A-Plot: Following a brutal assault by Darrien Tailfeathers, Sarah Bull (Cheri Maracle) is hospitalized. Leona (Carmen Moore) attempts to visit her to find common ground, but Sarah initially refuses to speak with her. The tension only breaks when Leona reveals a mark on her own neck, showing that she too was a victim of Darrien’s violence. Later, the conflict reaches a violent climax when the Stoney sisters, Wendy, and Sarah are confronted by Darrien. During the struggle, Darrien assaults Gail (Michelle Thrush); in a desperate act of self-defense, Gail stabs him. The traumatic event is witnessed by young Wendy, leaving the family shattered. B-Plot: A shroud of domestic violence continues to haunt the Fraser family as Debbie (Andrea Menard) and Alan (Justin Rain) find themselves lured back into Andy’s (Eric Schweig) orbit. Attempting to manipulate his way back into their lives, Andy puts on a romantic front, claiming he still loves Debbie and wants to reunite their family. Despite their efforts to move on, both mother and son struggle to resist the psychological pull of Andy's influence. C-Plot: Amidst the personal chaos, Leona continues her professional mission to exonerate Alex Henry (Jaren Brandt Bartlett). She works through the legal system to gather the evidence necessary to prove his innocence and end his wrongful imprisonment. D-Plot: Following an incident where Andy strikes Debbie and attempts to attack Alan, Alan and Daryl (Steven Cree Molison) discuss their father's volatility. Daryl asks if Andy has ever hit Debbie before; when Alan reveals he hasn't, he remains firm that "once is enough." Although Daryl agrees that the violence is not right, he attempts to justify the outburst by reminding Alan of the immense pressure Andy faces as Chief and the stress of juggling his responsibilities.
23	6	"Burn Baby Burn"	Ron E. Scott	Ron E. Scott & Damon Vignale	30 October 2013
A-Plot: The walls finally close in on Andy Fraser (Eric Schweig) as the murder investigation into Angel’s death intensifies and his latest shady business venture collapses. In a final, desperate act of self-preservation, Andy orchestrates the burning of the Band Office to destroy incriminating files before a pending government audit. However, his efforts to hide the evidence fail; the episode concludes with the historic moment of Andy being arrested and led away in handcuffs, effectively ending his decades-long grip on Blackstone. B-Plot: The toxic cycle of the Fraser family reaches a breaking point when Dr. Kurt Ellis (Cameron Bancroft) officially ends his affair with Debbie (Andrea Menard). Devastated and humiliated by the realization that she was just a "fling," Debbie's mental state deteriorates. Despite his arrest, she remains dangerously susceptible to Andy's psychological influence, highlighting the deep-seated nature of her addiction and trauma. C-Plot: The Stoney and Henry families find a path toward healing. Following Leona’s (Carmen Moore) persistent legal fight, Alex Henry (Jaren Brandt Bartlett) is exonerated and released from prison, finally cleared of the crime Andy committed. With the legal victory and the custody threat from Sarah fading, Leona and Gail (Michelle Thrush) take a monumental step toward family unity by inviting their ailing mother to return to the reserve. D-Plot: Alan Fraser's (Justin Rain) pattern of deception finally catches up to him. Having lied to Sheila (Ashley Callingbull) about his late-night activities—claiming to be at school while actually spending time at the Roxy—the truth comes out. A furious Sheila compares his behavior and dishonesty to that of his father, Andy. The comparison triggers a volatile argument, ending with Alan walking out on Sheila and effectively terminating their relationship, proving that he cannot yet escape the Fraser family's destructive legacy.

=== Season 4 (2014) ===
No. overall	No. in season	Title	Directed by	Written by	Original release date
24	1	"Payback's a Bitch"	Ron E. Scott	Ron E. Scott & Damon Vignale	11 November 2014
Andy is threatened in prison, while his family struggles to make it without him. Leona counsels Blackstone's young people after the fire, and Gail struggles to cope with the stabbing.
25	2	"Deeper and Deeper"	Ron E. Scott	Ron E. Scott & Damon Vignale	18 November 2014
Gail falls deeper into her addiction. Andy continues to feel the pressures of prison life. Daryl's girlfriend takes a bet from Jumbo (Bernard Starlight).
26	3	"Sext Me"	Ron E. Scott	Ron E. Scott & Damon Vignale	25 November 2014
Andy finds an unexpected friend among his enemies. Leona urges Stu to investigate a case. Victor seeks a financial opportunity for Blackstone.
27	4	"Truth or Dare"	Ron E. Scott	Ron E. Scott & Damon Vignale	2 December 2014
Leona pursues her search for the missing girls. Gail makes a mistake with Wendy that cannot be rectified. Andy comes to the aid of a fellow inmate.
28	5	"Where there's Smoke"	Ron E. Scott	Ron E. Scott & Damon Vignale	9 December 2014
Leona, Gail, and Wilma are paid a visit by someone from their past (Glen Gould). Jumbo gets in too deep financially. Victor seeks advice from an unlikely connection.
29	6	"Wolves vs. Sheep"	Ron E. Scott	Ron E. Scott & Damon Vignale	16 December 2014
Andy gives Alan advice while Debbie's condition deteriorates. Gail returns home to find Leona full of resentment; Daryl discovers unexpectedly of a betrayal.
30	7	"Discovery"	Ron E. Scott	Ron E. Scott & Damon Vignale	23 December 2014
Gail seeks psychological help. Andy and Daryl discover one of their father's secrets. Victor is under pressure from the community to make a decision.
31	8	"There Will Be Blood"	Ron E. Scott	Ron E. Scott & Damon Vignale	30 December 2014
The proposal to drill for oil divides Blackstone, but brings the Stoney family together. Victor's integrity is questioned while Andy seeks revenge.

=== Season 5 (2015) ===
No. overall	No. in season	Title	Directed by	Written by	Original release date
32	1	"Beginning of the End"	Ron E. Scott	Gil Cardinal	3 November 2015
The search continues to find Wendy. Alan suffers after the explosion at the Blockade. Andy works every angle he can think of to avoid going to jail. A major character goes missing.
33	2	"Super Dad"	Ron E. Scott	Ron E. Scott	10 November 2015
An attempt to return Wendy to safety goes terribly wrong. Andy shows Hillis he is ready to turn threats into action. Daryl reconnects with an old friend with criminal ties.
34	3	"The Worm Has Turned"	Ron E. Scott	Susie Maloney and Ron E. Scott	17 November 2015
The community mourns a death. Leona considers running for chief. Wilma takes a surprising stand against her daughters and someone from Alan's past pays him a visit.
35	4	"Back in the Saddle"	Ron E. Scott	Mike Gosselin and Ron E. Scott	24 November 2015
A clever plan puts Andy in the running for chief. Daryl makes a shady deal to save his business. Wilma's health declines rapidly and Gail finds an outlet in art therapy. Alan struggles to fit in at school, but finds a friend in Sheila.
36	5	"The River's Edge"	Ron E. Scott	Christina Ray and Ron E. Scott	1 December 2015
The community seeks justice after a brutal attack on a Blackstone youth. A backchannel investigation drives an unexpected wedge between Daryl and Jack and puts Gina in danger's way.
37	6	"Retribution"	Ron E. Scott	Ron E. Scott and Damon Vignale	8 December 2015
Andy and Daryl seek their own kind of justice. Issues surrounds the care of Smokey's foster kids. Wilma fights to get out of the hospital.
38	7	"Bottle Caps"	Ron E. Scott	Damon Vignale	15 December 2015
Leona, Andy, and Wilma face obstacles in their way in each and every different path they choose to take, which will decide their lives.
39	8	"Flat Line"	Ron E. Scott	Ron E. Scott and Ian Carpenter	23 December 2015
Everyone on Blackstone now has to face the future, whether it is a sad or bright one in the series finale. In the end, though, hope can still be seen beyond the horizon.

== See also ==
- Redfern Now an Australian television series with a similar theme

== Accolades ==
Awards and accolades for Blackstone
Year	Award	Category	Nominee(s)	Result
2011	Gemini Awards	Best Actress in a Drama Series	Michelle Thrush	Won
2011	Gemini Awards	Best Actress in a Drama Series	Carmen Moore	Nominated
2011	Gemini Awards	Best Animated Title Design	Steve Seeley and Darren Bierman	Nominated
2011	Leo Awards	Best Screenwriting in a Dramatic Series	Damon Vignale	Won
2011	Leo Awards	Best Dramatic Series	Blackstone	Nominated
2011	Leo Awards	Best Lead Performance by a Male in a Dramatic Series	Eric Schweig	Nominated
2011	Leo Awards	Best Lead Performance by a Female in a Dramatic Series	Michelle Thrush	Nominated
2011	Leo Awards	Best Lead Performance by a Female in a Dramatic Series	Carmen Moore	Won
2012	Leo Award			
2012	Leo Award	Best Dramatic Program	Blackstone	Won
2012	Leo Award	Best Lead Performance by a Male in a Dramatic Series	Steven Cree Molison	Won
2012	Leo Award	Best Supporting Performance by a Male in a Dramatic Series	Frank Cassini	Won
2012	Leo Award	Best Supporting Performance by a Female in a Dramatic Series	Tantoo Cardinal	Won
2012	Leo Award	Best Lead Performance by a Female in a Dramatic Series	Carmen Moore	Nominated
2012	Leo Award	Best Screenwriting in a Dramatic Series	Damon Vignale	Nominated
2013	1st Canadian Screen Awards			
2013	1st Canadian Screen Awards	Best Actor in a Continuing Leading Dramatic Role	Steven Cree Molison	Nominated
2013	1st Canadian Screen Awards	Best Performance by an Actress in a Featured Supporting Role in a Dramatic Program or Series	Georgina Lightning	Nominated
2013	1st Canadian Screen Awards	Best Achievement in Casting	Rhonda Fisekci for the episode "Forgiveness"	Nominated
2014	2nd Canadian Screen Awards			
2014	2nd Canadian Screen Awards	Best Dramatic Series	Blackstone	Nominated
2014	2nd Canadian Screen Awards	Best Writing in a Dramatic Series	Damon Vignale and Ron E. Scott	Nominated
2014	2nd Canadian Screen Awards	Best Actress in a Continuing Leading Dramatic Role	Michelle Thrush	Nominated
