= Robyn Hood =

Canadian action drama television series

- Genre: Action drama
- Created by: Director X
- Written by: Chris Roberts
- Starring: Jessye Romeo; Nykeem Provo; Ksenia Daniela Kharlamova; Ian Matthews
- Country of origin: Canada
- Original language: English
- No. of seasons: 1
- No. of episodes: 8

Production
- Producer: Boat Rocker
- Running time: 60 minutes
- Production companies: Corus Entertainment; Boat Rocker Studios; Eleventh Hour Films; Luti Media

Original release
- Network: Global Television Network
- Release: September 27 – November 15, 2023

Robyn Hood is a Canadian action drama television series described as a modernized reimagining of the English legend of Robin Hood. Created by music video director and filmmaker Director X (Julien Christian Lutz), the series stars Jessye Romeo, Nykeem Provo, Idrissa Sanogo, and Ksenia Daniela Kharlamova. It airs on the Global Television Network and stream on StackTV.

Premiering in September 2023 with an eight-episode run, the series follows the young activist rapper Robyn and her anti-authoritarian masked hip-hop band The Hood living in a working class area in the fictional city of New Nottingham as they battle with "the corrupt elite" including a property developer and The Sheriff. Corus Entertainment executive Troy Reeb described the series as a "dark and gritty take", featuring "a heroine challenging the status quo and fighting oppression".

In June 2024, it was announced that the series was cancelled due to low ratings.

== Cast ==
- Jessye Romeo as Robyn Loxley (based on Robin Hood), young rapper and leader of The Hood
- Nykeem Provo as Little John, Robyn's right-hand man and member of The Hood
- Idrissa Sanogo as Alan A. Dale (based on Alan-a-Dale), The Hood's music producer
- Ksenia Daniela Kharlamova as Much (based on Much the Miller's Son), a mechanical genius and The Hood's vocalist
- Jonathan Langdon as Tuck (based on Friar Tuck), The Hood's eccentric hacker
- Sydney Kuhne as Marian Fitzwalter (based on Maid Marian), a determined lawyer
- Ian Matthews as John Prince (based on Prince John of England), a wealthy and villainous real estate tycoon
- Kira Guloien as The Sheriff, a strong willed and corrupt sheriff who runs a tight surveillance
- Matias Lucas as Chet Prince, John Prince's son who harbors an attraction towards Robyn
- Manuel Rodriguez-Saenz as Guy Gisbourne (based on Guy of Gisbourne), a ruthless criminal kingpin and rapper
- Lisa Michelle Cornelius as Tressie Loxley, Robyn's mother

== Development and production ==
The series began production on June 20, 2022, and was filmed in Toronto and Hamilton, Ontario. It was produced by Corus Entertainment in partnership with Boat Rocker, Creative Rain, Eleventh Hour Films and Luti Media.

The decision to change the character of Robin Hood from a man to a young woman was made in 2019 during the development process, when a sizzle reel was presented by Director X to Kathleen Meek, manager of original content at Corus Entertainment, who was said to have liked the idea. Meek said it was "a massive priority for us to get this made", stating that "everything about it — the team, the authenticity — felt like such a fresh way into the Robin Hood legend".

According to Appleyard, the series was entirely financed out of Canada. Funding sources include the Canada Media Fund, Ontario regional tax credits and Corus, who provided a license fee. The writers room for the series was initially in-person but switched to virtual when the COVID-19 pandemic hit.

While the protagonists are black and the antagonists are primarily white, Director X stated that the show was not written "with any race in mind". He elaborated by calling it an "all-black show", but said it was not about "being black". He said it was focused on "rich versus poor... we have gay characters and black characters and all this stuff. But it's not what Robyn Hood is about. They just exist in this world, like we all exist in the normal world... It's essentially a superhero show."

== Reception ==
As of October 26, 2023, Robyn Hood scored 1/10 on IMDb. The show's creator accused online critics of having rating-bombed the series due to the fact that a black woman was cast as Robin Hood.

== See also ==
- List of films and television series featuring Robin Hood
