= Braeden Clarke =

Canadian actor

Braeden Clarke (born March 25, 1993) is a Canadian actor from the Mikisew Cree First Nation in Alberta. He is most noted for his supporting role as Leo in the television series Little Bird, for which he won the Canadian Screen Award for Best Supporting Performance in a Drama Series at the 12th Canadian Screen Awards in 2024.

He has also appeared in the television series Outlander, SkyMed and North of North, and the films Run Woman Run and Stellar.
