= SkyMed =

Canadian medical drama television series

- Genre: Medical drama
- Created by: Julie Puckrin
- Starring: Natasha Calis; Morgan Holmstrom; Praneet Akilla; Aason Nadjiwan; Mercedes Morris; Thomas Elms; Kheon Clarke; Rebecca Kwan; Braeden Clarke; Emilia McCarthy; Patrick Kwok-Choon; Jeff Teravainen; Aaron Ashmore
- Country of origin: Canada
- Original language: English
- No. of seasons: 4
- No. of episodes: 35

Production
- Executive producer: Julie Puckrin
- Editors: John Nicholls; Teresa Hannigan; Stephen Roque; Matthew Anas; Shelley Therrin
- Running time: 44 minutes
- Production companies: Piazza Entertainment; Eagle Vision; CBC; CBS Studios

Original release
- Network: CBC
- Release: July 10, 2022 – March 2, 2025
- Network: Paramount+
- Release: July 22, 2022 – present

SkyMed is a Canadian medical drama television series that premiered on July 10, 2022, on CBC, and July 22, 2022, on Paramount+. The series centres on the nurses and pilots working for an air ambulance service in remote northern Manitoba. The series has been renewed for a second season, which premiered in October 2023. In March 2024, the series was renewed for a third season. In June 2025, the series was renewed for a fourth season, which premiered on May 21, 2026, only on Paramount+.

== Cast and characters ==
=== Main ===
- Natasha Calis as Nurse Hayley Roberts, a delivery nurse leaving a secret behind in Toronto.
- Morgan Holmstrom as Crystal Highway, a Cree/Métis "mama bear" caretaker with a tough-as-nails attitude who is the soul of SkyMed.
- Aaron Ashmore as Captain William "Wheezer" Heaseman, an experienced pilot, who prefers cargo flights over medivac flights. He is the den dad of the pilots and nurses, dispensing advice and grilled meat in equal measure. He also gets involved with flight nurse Hayley.
- Praneet Akilla as Jay "Chopper" Chopra, a pilot and engineer who aspires to be an astronaut and faces challenges in his personal relationships.
- Mercedes Morris as Lexi Martine, an up-and-coming pilot who is often forced to choose between her convictions and her ambitions.
- Thomas Elms as Captain Milosz Nowak,(seasons 1-3) a pilot and bartender whose tough-love attitude wins him many colleagues but few friends.
- Kheon Clarke as Tristan Green, (seasons 1-3)an empathic, well-liked flight nurse.
- Braeden Clarke as Jeremy Wood (seasons 1–2; guest, seasons 3-4), Crystal's ex, North House's resident fixer and smuggler.
- Aason ‘Ace’ Nadjiwon as Captain Austen Bodie (seasons 1–2; recurring, season 3), a hotshot pilot romantically involved with Hayley.
- Emilia McCarthy as Madison Van Camp (seasons 1–2; recurring, season 3), a local waitress and bartender involved with Bodie.
- Rebecca Kwan as Emma Lin (season 1), an upbeat and professional ground nurse at North House First Nation, Crystal and Jeremy's home community.
- Patrick Kwok-Choon as Dr. Trevor Sung (season 1), an ER physician at the local hospital who is interested in Crystal both personally and professionally.
- Jeff Teravainen as Chief Pilot Pierce (season 1), SkyMed's commanding officer.
- Sydney Kuhne as Stef (season 2 – present), a paramedic and Lexi's girlfriend.
- Nicola Correia-Damude as Chief Nurse Marianne Fereira (season 3), a nurse and PR expert who comes to head up the SkyMed nurses and runs them strictly.

=== Recurring ===
- Ryan Ali as Reese
- Matthew Kevin Anderson as Brad Maloney, a loading hand and pilot hopeful with questionable morals.
- Ryan DeLong as Steve
- Gino Anania as Devon, Emma's often too-serious fiancée.
- Sharon Bajer as Denise, Bodie's mom
- Laura Olafson as Darla
- Karl Thordarson as Frank
- Anthony Grant as TJ

== Production and development ==
The show was developed by Julie Puckrin, who drew inspiration from her nurse sister and pilot brother-in-law who worked aboard air ambulances. To help with the stories the writing staff included both Indigenous and queer writers.

The initial season was shot from late August 2021 until mid-January 2022 in Winnipeg and northern Manitoba. A lot of the effects on the show were done on a practical basis rather than using green-screen technology.

== Episodes ==
Season	Episodes	Originally released		
Season	Episodes	First released	Last released	Network
1	9	July 10, 2022	September 4, 2022	CBC / Paramount+
2	9	October 1, 2023	November 26, 2023	CBC / Paramount+
3	9	January 5, 2025	March 2, 2025	CBC / Paramount+
4	8	May 21, 2026		Paramount+

=== Season 1 (2022) ===
No. overall	No. in season	Title	Directed by	Written by	Original release date	Canadian viewers
1	1	"Pilots and Nurses and Bears, Oh My!"	Steven A. Adelson	Julie Puckrin	July 10, 2022	N/A
Nurse-out-of-water Hayley Roberts joins the fast-paced team of nurses and pilots at SkyMed, living and working together to fly air ambulances and save lives in rugged Northern Manitoba.
2	2	"Line Indoc"	Steven A. Adelson	Julie Puckrin	July 17, 2022	N/A
When a guilt-ridden Lexi finally goes flight line, she locks horns with training Captain Bodie, while Crystal tries to get to the bottom of what Jeremy's been smuggling and how it's connected to Wheezer's crash.
3	3	"The Kids Are Alright"	Ron Murphy	Nikolijne Troubetzkoy & Roxann Whitebean	July 24, 2022	N/A
Bodie struggles to come to terms with Madison's pregnancy, while Crystal wrestles with her past and what it means for her future.
4	4	"Where There's Smoke"	Ron Murphy	Jennica Harper	July 31, 2022	N/A
The investigation into Wheezer's crash puts Lexi in the hot seat, but when a wildfire threatens Crystal's community, will she cross the line to save a patient's life?
5	5	"Bushwhacked"	Madison Thomas	Amber-Sekowan Daniels	August 7, 2022	456,000
Survival Training for the SkyMed crew takes a dangerous boil over. Meanwhile, Crystal struggles with an unexpected hit-and-run patient with high stakes consequences.
6	6	"Girls Just Wanna Have Fun"	Madison Thomas	Vivian Lin	August 14, 2022	462,000
Hayley seeks distraction from her own health concerns by throwing Emma a bachelorette party, but when a patient takes an unexpected turn, Hayley will be forced to face her fears.
7	7	"Daj Mi Buzi"	Shamim Sarif	JP Larocque	August 21, 2022	N/A
Nowark stretches himself too thin with drastic consequences. Meanwhile, Bodie struggles with an unexpected truth about his mother, while Crystal wrestles with a shocking threat to her community.
8	8	"Frozen"	Shamim Sarif	Story by : Meegwun Fairbrother & Jennica Harper; Teleplay by : Jennica Harper	August 28, 2022	N/A
A blizzard traps each of the team members with the person they least want to be stuck with in dire circumstances. As the temperature drops, emotions start to boil over.
9	9	"Leave It All on the Ice"	Sorcha Vasey	Jessica Meya & Julie Puckrin	September 4, 2022	N/A
Hayley struggles to make a life-altering decision, while Bodie reels from his son's premature birth. Crystal must deal with the consequences of Jeremy's actions once and for all.

=== Season 2 (2023) ===
No. overall	No. in season	Title	Directed by	Written by	Original release date
10	1	"Return to Base"	James Genn	Julie Puckrin	October 1, 2023
SkyMed expands its medevac service into new territory, throwing everyone into disarray as familiar faces return and intriguing new flight crew arrive.
11	2	"Spun Out"	James Genn	Jessica Meya	October 8, 2023
As the SkyMed crew wait for their fallen team member to wake up, Crystal starts to find her feet as a medical student, and a secret from the past threatens Novak and Tristan's relationship.
12	3	"Things That Matter Most"	Sorcha Vasey	Meegwun Fairbrother	October 15, 2023
The SkyMed team must rally despite personal differences and challenges to search for a missing medevac with four flight crew members aboard.
13	4	"Turbulence"	Sorcha Vasey	Damon Vignale	October 22, 2023
As Chopper returns to flying medevacs, the truth about what happened in Selection Camp finally comes out. Lexi's dream promotion takes an unnerving turn.
14	5	"Code Silver"	Norma Bailey	Karolyn Carnie & Julie Puckrin	October 29, 2023
Shortages force the SkyMed flight nurses to staff the Thompson Emergency Rom overnight, but a volatile patient throws the hospital into chaos.
15	6	"Little Lies"	Norma Bailey	JP Larocque	November 5, 2023
A fun night on the town creates unexpected consequences and a dangerous call with a paralyzed patient pushes Stef to finally reveal the secret that brought her to Thompson.
16	7	"Old Wounds"	Ron Murphy	Anusree Roy	November 12, 2023
A sick patient hits close to home, leaving Crystal reeling. Hayley struggles to face the consequences of her actions when Wheezer discovers her secret.
17	8	"Before Sunrise, After Sunset"	Ron Murphy	Katrina Saville	November 19, 2023
As the SkyMed team members face an inquiry into a patient fatality. Hayley struggles to piece together blurry memories of what caused her relapse and whether she caused the fatality.
18	9	"Out with a Bang"	Damon Vignale	Julie Puckrin	November 26, 2023
As the pressure surrounding the SkyMed expansion comes to a head, a shocking emergency leaves one of the flight crew fighting for their life.

=== Season 3 (2025) ===
No. overall	No. in season	Title	Directed by	Written by	Original release date
19	1	"Arrivals, Departures"	Sorcha Vasey	Julie Puckrin	January 5, 2025
The arrival of a new Chief nurse throws the whole SkyMed flight crew off-balance, until an unexpected accident causes a shocking loss.
20	2	"The Fire"	Sorcha Vasey	Katrina Saville	January 12, 2025
As the crew struggles to say a difficult goodbye to a fallen team member, the loss forces each of them to question themselves in different ways.
21	3	"Ride Along"	Ron Murphy	Damon Vignale	January 19, 2025
A film crew follows the team, causing tension; Stef and Chopper handle a tough call and must break protocol, creating more stress for the group.
22	4	"Stuck"	Ron Murphy	Meegwun Fairbrother	January 26, 2025
Crystal tries to survive a typical day in the life of a medical student; everyone else is forced to finally deal with the simmering problems they've been trying to ignore.
23	5	"Marianncing the Stone"	Sorcha Vasey	Karolyn Carnie	February 2, 2025
When a camping trip with the cadets goes awry, Chopper and Marianne find themselves stranded together in the wilderness and on an unexpected adventure.
24	6	"Wheezervision"	Sorcha Vasey	Julie Puckrin & Ryan Atimoyoo	February 9, 2025
After losing his vision, Wheezer is forced to entertain himself by imaging his pilot's lives in wild and fantastical movie genres.
25	7	"Altitude"	Ron Murphy	Anika Jarrett	February 16, 2025
When three of the flight crew are stranded on a plane with a bomb that will explode if they try to land, everyone on the ground races to try to save them.
26	8	"Clarity"	Ron Murphy	Katrina Saville	February 23, 2025
Aviation Authority comes to investigate events in the SkyMed documentary, just as Marianne's secret past is revealed and Wheezer struggles with whether his vision will ever return.
27	9	"Chasing Sunsets"	Sorcha Vasey	Julie Puckrin	March 2, 2025
Bodie's wedding celebrations take an unexpected turn, forcing the SkyMed flight crew to race to save one of their own.

=== Season 4 (2026) ===
No. overall	No. in season	Title	Directed by	Written by	Original release date
28	1	"Incoming"	Paolo Barzman	Julie Puckrin	May 21, 2026
Head Nurse Hayley and Lead Pilot Wheezer deal with different characters and emerging conflicts while SkyMed evaluates potential new medics and pilots for the aviation team.
29	2	"Team Building"	John Stead	Jennica Harper	May 21, 2026
Hayley and Wheezer disagree about leadership approaches and the appearance of his former fiancée, while attempting to mold the rookie medics and pilots into a cohesive unit.
30	3	"Kidneys Out"	John Stead	Andrew De Angelis	May 21, 2026
After a kidney vanishes from a stranded SkyMed aircraft, the team races to locate the organ before it becomes unusable.
31	4	"Deadheading"	Paolo Barzman	Julie Puckrin	May 21, 2026
When a fugitive confuses Wheezer for a medical responder and kidnaps him to treat his injured accomplice, Wheezer must quickly determine how to save the patient's life while keeping himself and his crew safe from the threatening criminals.
32	5	"Mercury Retrograde"	Bruce McDonald	Karolyn Carnie	May 21, 2026
A benched Stef begins her initial shift at the Whiskey Hatch and connects with a fortune teller. At the same time, Crystal disputes Zay's decision, Maya oversteps boundaries, and Hayley discovers what really happened with Piper.
33	6	"77 Hours"	Bruce McDonald	Ryan Atimoyoo	May 21, 2026
Hayley rushes to prevent Piper from escaping with her sibling. Meanwhile, Crystal and Zay struggle to stay alive after becoming stuck in a deserted mine, forcing Crystal to make a critical choice that could mean life or death.
34	7	"Aftermath"	Paolo Barzman	Emily Mikos & Julie Puckrin	May 21, 2026
During a tornado warning, Crystal questions her mine decisions as Zay struggles with his new reality, Lexi spirals when a patient triggers her grief, and Piper confronts what she's been avoiding.
35	8	"Stick the Landing"	Paolo Barzman	Julie Puckrin	May 21, 2026
With SkyMed's future in jeopardy, Wheezer is forced to face his anxieties, Stef gets back to work, Lexi and Maya struggle with their past demons, and Crystal and Hayley must decide what comes next.

== Release ==
The first season was released on-demand in the United States and the United Kingdom by Paramount+ on July 10, 2022, and in New Zealand by TVNZ+ on August 5, 2022. The second season followed on January 11, 2024. The third season was released in Canada on January 5, 2025. Paramount+ released season 3 in the US on May 15, 2025.
