= Little Bird (TV series) =

Canadian drama television series

- Genre: Drama
- Created by: Hannah Moscovitch; Jennifer Podemski
- Developed by: Jennifer Podemski; Ernest Webb; Catherine Bainbridge
- Starring: Darla Contois; Lisa Edelstein; Ellyn Jade; Osawa Muskwa; Rowen Kahn; Joshua Odjick; Imajyn Cardinal; Braeden Clarke; Alanna Bale; Eric Schweig; Michelle Thrush
- Country of origin: Canada
- Original languages: English; Hebrew; Ojibwe
- No. of episodes: 6

Production
- Executive producers: Jennifer Podemski; Catherine Bainbridge; Dante Di Loreto; Christina Fon; Nicholas Hirst; Zoe Hopkins; Linda Ludwick; Hannah Moscovitch; Jeremy Podeswa; Elle-Máijá Tailfeathers; Kim Todd; Christian Vesper; Ernest Webb
- Producers: Tanya Brunel; Philippe Chabot; Jessica Dunn; Lori Lozinski; Claire Mackinnon; Ellen Rutter
- Production companies: Fremantle; APTN; Bell Media

Original release
- Network: Crave; APTN lumi
- Release: May 26 – June 30, 2023

Little Bird is a Canadian drama television miniseries, which premiered on Crave and APTN lumi on May 26, 2023. Created by Jennifer Podemski and Hannah Moscovitch with the participation of Jeremy Podeswa as an executive producer, the series centres on a First Nations woman who was adopted into a Jewish family during the Sixties Scoop, as she attempts to reconnect with her birth family and heritage.

The series stars Darla Contois as Esther Rosenblum/Bezhig Little Bird, alongside Ellyn Jade, Osawa Muskwa, Joshua Odjick, Imajyn Cardinal, Eric Schweig, Lisa Edelstein, Braeden Clarke and Michelle Thrush in supporting roles, with episodes directed by Elle-Máijá Tailfeathers and Zoe Hopkins.

== Distribution ==
The series, the first original drama series to be commissioned by Crave since its rebranding from The Movie Network in 2018, is distributed by Crave, APTN, and APTN Lumi.

== Main Cast ==
- Darla Contois as Bezhig Little Bird/Esther Rosenblum, a young woman born on the Long Pine Reserve in Saskatchewan. Although her family is devoted and loving, Bezhig and two of her siblings are apprehended by Child Protection Services after an incident with Bezhig, her twin brother Niizh, and the police.
  - Keris Hope Hill as Young Bezhig/Esther
- Lisa Edelstein as Golda Rosenblum, Bezhig/Esther's adopted mother. Now divorced, Golda is shown to be somewhat withdrawn and skeptical of middle class society.
- Ellyn Jade as Patti Little Bird, the birth mother of Bezhig and her siblings. Although initially soft-spoken and gentle, Patti is forced to fight to try to regain custody of her three younger children.
- Osawa Muskwa as Morris Little Bird, Bezhig's birth father. On the day his three younger children are apprehended, Morris has taken his elder son Leo on his first hunt. Morris is shown to be a devoted and protective husband and father.
- Rowen Kahn as David, fiancé of Bezhig/Esther.
- Joshua Odjick as Niizh, the younger Little Bird son who is apprehended with his sisters.
  - Gideon Starr as Young Niizh
- Imajyn Cardinal as Dora Mueller, Bezhig's younger sister who is adopted into a strict family in Saskatchewan; she tells Esther/Bezhig she has run away from home.
  - Charlotte Cutler as Young Dora
- Braeden Clarke as Leo Little Bird, Bezhig's elder brother. On the day his siblings are apprehended, Leo goes on his first hunt with his father.
  - Tayton Mianskum as Young Leo
- Alanna Bale as Adele, a trainee case worker when the Little Bird children are apprehended. Adele is disturbed by her superior's methods and mentality, but rarely voices this.
- Eric Schweig as Asin, the grandfather of Leo, Bezhig, Niizh and Dora, who takes care of Leo while the others are apprehended; father of Morris.
- Michelle Thrush as Brigit, an aunt of Bezhig and her siblings.

== Episodes ==
No.	Title	Directed by	Written by	Original release date
1	"Love is all Around"	Elle-Máijá Tailfeathers	Hannah Moscovitch	May 26, 2023
This episode cuts back and forth between the day she was taken from her family in 1968 and her engagement party in 1985. 1968, Long Pine Reserve, Saskatchewan: Bezhig Little Bird lives with her parents and three siblings. While her father and eldest brother, Leo, are out hunting, her youngest sister Dora falls ill. She is with her brother Niizh when he accidentally breaks the windshield of a police car while playing with a slingshot. They are apprehended by the police and social service workers are brought to inspect their home. They find the living conditions inadequate, and the children are removed from their home and brought to an orphanage. 1985, Montreal: Bezhig, now known as Esther Rosenblum, is celebrating her engagement to her fiance, David. She was adopted by a Jewish family residing in Montreal, and is completing her first year of law school. During the party, she is praised by family members for her academic success, and makes a toast thanking her family and her fiance. She overhears her future mother-in-law making racist comments about her, and leaves the party early, comforted by her adoptive mother Golda.
2	"So Put Together"	Elle-Máijá Tailfeathers	Hannah Moscovitch	June 2, 2023
3	"The Land that Takes You"	Elle-Máijá Tailfeathers	Story by : Shannon Masters & Zoe Hopkins; Teleplay by : Zoe Hopkins	June 9, 2023
4	"Burning Down The House"	Zoe Hopkins	Story by : Darrell Dennis; Teleplay by : Zoe Hopkins	June 16, 2023
5	"I Want My Mom"	Zoe Hopkins	Hannah Moscovitch	June 23, 2023
6	"Bineshi Kwe"	Zoe Hopkins	Zoe Hopkins	June 30, 2023

Coming Home: Wanna Icipus Kupi, a documentary film profiling the real-life stories of actual Sixties Scoop survivors, was released on June 30 concurrently with the final episode of the series.

== Accolades ==
List of awards and nominations
Year	Award	Category	Recipients	Result	Ref.
2024	12th Canadian Screen Awards	Best Drama Series	Jennifer Podemski, Hannah Moscovitch, Christina Fon, Ernest Webb, Catherine Bainbridge, Linda Ludwick, Kim Todd, Nicholas Hirst, Zoe Hopkins, Elle-Máijá Tailfeathers, Jeremy Podeswa, Christian Vesper, Dante Di Loreto, Tanya Brunel, Jessica Dunn, Claire MacKinnon, Philippe Chabot, Lori Lozinski, Ellen Rutter	Won	
2024	12th Canadian Screen Awards	Best Direction, Drama Series; episode: Love is all Around	Elle-Máijá Tailfeathers	Won	
2024	12th Canadian Screen Awards	Best Direction, Drama Series; episode Bineshi Kwe	Zoe Hopkins	Nominated	
2024	12th Canadian Screen Awards	Best Lead Performer, Drama Series	Darla Contois	Won	
2024	12th Canadian Screen Awards	Best Lead Performer, Drama Series	Ellyn Jade	Nominated	
2024	12th Canadian Screen Awards	Best Guest Performance, Drama Series	Imajyn Cardinal	Nominated	
2024	12th Canadian Screen Awards	Best Supporting Performer, Drama Series	Braeden Clarke	Won	
2024	12th Canadian Screen Awards	Best Ensemble Performance, Drama	Darla Contois, Ellyn Jade, Osawa Muskwa, Lisa Edelstein, Michelle Thrush, Braeden Clarke, Imajyn Cardinal, Joshua Odjick	Won	
2024	12th Canadian Screen Awards	Best Achievement in Casting, Fiction	Lisa Parasyn, Carmen Kotyk	Won	

== See also ==
- Unsettled, Canadian drama series with similar themes created concurrently with, but separately from, Little Bird.
