= Groupe MCM =

French television company

MCM Groupe
- Formerly: Euromusique-MCM
- Type: SAS
- Industry: Entertainment (television, Internet)
- Genre: Music television network
- Founded: 1 July 1990
- Defunct: 14 February 2021
- Successor: Lagardère Active; Groupe M6 (2019)
- Headquarters: 28 rue François 1er, 75008 Paris, France
- Divisions: MCM; MCM 2 Mezzo
- Website: mcm.net

Groupe MCM (formerly Euromusique-MCM) was a French television company, created by Europe 1 Communication. In 2000, Europe 1 Communication was integrated into the Lagardère Active holding and made a digital alliance with Groupe Canal+ taking a 49% share in its thematic channels. In January 2005, Lagardère Active and Canal+ divested their cross-shareholdings in order to launch their channels on DTT from which the CSA had cancelled their licenses on the grounds of their joint ownerships, including the Groupe MCM-led i-MCM, which project was renamed and launched as Europe 2 TV. In May 2019, Lagardère sold most its television assets including MCM to the Groupe M6, who incorporated its channels to its thematic unit.

== Television channels ==
=== Channels still active ===
These are now part of M6 Thématiques.

- MCM
- RFM TV (still named MCM Pop in Portugal)
- MCM Top
- Mezzo was acquired by Groupe Canal+ and Groupe Les Échos-Le Parisien (LVMH)

=== Defunct channels ===
- MCM Africa (sold to Modern Times Group and replaced by Trace Urban)
- Virgin 17 (Sold to Bolloré and replaced by Direct Star then Bollore sold the channel to Canal+ Group and replaced by D17
- MCM Belgique (Closed on 31 December 2009)
- Muzzik (Merged with Mezzo from France Télévisions on 2 April 2002 as international TV Channel)

== Administration ==
Presidents

- Jean-Pierre Ozannat (1 July 1990 – 1 August 2002)
- Frédéric Schlesinger (8 January 2002 – 31 August 2003)
- Christophe Sabot (1 September 2003 – 2008)
- Emmanuelle Guilbart (2008 – 2010)
