= The Amsterdam Red Light District =

French band

- Also known as: TARLD
- Origin: France
- Genres: Metalcore, heavy metal music, Punk rock, hardcore punk
- Years active: Since 2005
- Members: Elio Sxone; Maxime Comby; Grégory Clert; Julien Chanel
- Website: www.tarldtheband.com

The Amsterdam Red Light District or TARLD, is a French alternative rock and hardcore punk band originally from Lyon, in Rhône-Alpes. The group was formed in November 2005 by Maxime Comby (guitar), Julien Chanel (drums), and Grégory Clert (bass). In 2008, Elio Sxone (vocals) joined the group to form the current lineup.

TARLD quickly distinguished itself with highly energetic and acrobatic concerts, allowing them to share the stage with other notable bands from the rock and hardcore scene such as Refused, Raised Fist, 36 Crazyfists, Slayer, and Anti-Flag, throughout several tours in Europe.

Their latest album, Trapped, was released on May 20, 2022.

== History ==
=== Beginnings and Dear Diary (2010–2013) ===
The Amsterdam Red Light District was formed in 2005 in Lyon. After some compositions, the group found its own sound and identity, a blend of rock and hardcore, with influences from bands like Refused, The Bronx, The Ghost of a Thousand, and The Bled. The group gained notoriety as a live band due to the intensity of their performances, allowing them to play numerous shows with internationally renowned bands across Europe, such as Refused, Anti-Flag, 36 Crazyfists, Comeback Kid, and Slayer.

In February 2009, the group filmed the clip for their very first single Shine a Life, which was aired on Lagardère MCM France, MCM Belgium, and Virgin 17. In the summer of 2009, TARLD recorded their first album, Dear Diary, featuring James Isaiah Munoz, the singer of the Texas band The Bled, and released it in February 2010 on their independent label Red Light Records. The group promoted this first album by touring nine countries in six months, including Sweden, Norway, and Denmark, supported by Rockstar Energy Drink and Stars Music.

In mid-2011, TARLD released a new EP, I'm Not Insane, with four new tracks. The group released the clip for their new self-titled single, this time aired on Direct Star from Canal+ and Nolife. Between April and May 2012, TARLD again toured in England, Wales, Switzerland, Belgium, Netherlands, and Germany for about twenty shows to promote this new EP. In March 2012, The Amsterdam Red Light District won the European Macbeth contest among more than 500 bands and 30,000 votes, allowing them to perform at the Groezrock Festival 2012, Europe's main punk rock festival. The group also played at two major European festivals that same year: Mair1 Festival (Germany) and Rockstorm Festival (France). In 2013, TARLD began writing their new album and embarked on their fifth European tour, featuring major festivals like Resurrection Fest (Spain), Tells Bells Festival (Germany), and Sylak Festival (France).

=== Gone for a While (2014–2017) ===
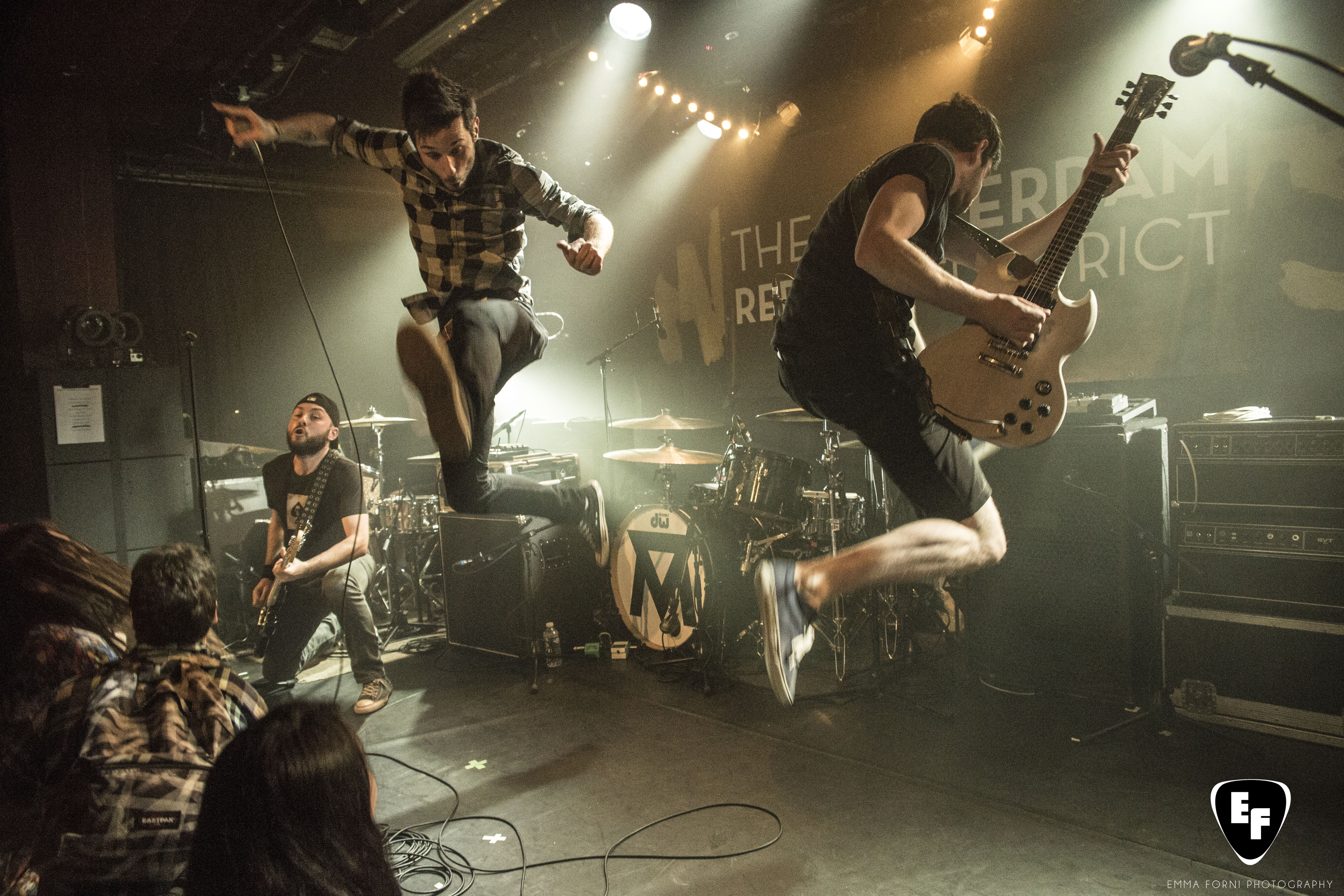
TARLD in concert at La Maroquinerie in Paris on March 10, 2015, as the opening act for the band Marmozets

Between May and July 2014, the group recorded their second album, Gone For a While, which was released on November 26, 2014. Justin Schlosberg from the band Hell Is for Heroes also guest appeared on one track. Several singles were to follow, starting with Gone For a While supported by a music video planned for September 2014, and then A Chance to Change in December 2014.

Promotion for the album was handled through European tours starting in October 2014, a release party in Lyon, and an event in Paris with the radio station Oüi FM. The group was also set for numerous summer festivals in 2015. Specialized European and American media outlets took interest in the project and aired the new album, including Kerrang!, Rock Sound, Rock & Folk, Revolver, AbsolutePunk, PunkNews, and Oüi FM.

=== Sapere Aude (2018–2022) ===
Their third album, Sapere Aude, was released on March 2, 2018, and was accompanied by their new music video The Best Is Yet to Come, which was a collaboration with Liam Cormier of the band Cancer Bats. It was accompanied by an innovative 360° music video titled Carry On.

Following this new album, TARLD embarked on a tour across Europe, then in Japan in September 2018, and were invited to perform at Hellfest 2019.

The group later returned to Japan in 2019 for a series of seven concerts around Tokyo and its suburbs.

=== Trapped (since 2022) ===
Their fourth album, Trapped, was released on May 20, 2022.

== Members ==
- Maxime Comby - guitar (since 2005)
- Grégory Clert - bass (since 2005)
- Julien Chanel - drums (since 2005)
- Elio Sxone - vocals (since 2008)

== Discography ==
=== Studio albums ===
2010: Dear Diary
1. Running Away
2. Point of No Return
3. Shine a Life
4. Midnight Is Coming
5. Guilty 'till We Die
6. Leave Me, I'm Worst, I'm Evil
7. It's Nice to See You Smile Again
8. From the Inside
9. The Party Is Over
10. Honesty Is Buffering
11. Dear Diary (feat. James Munoz from The Bled)
2014: Gone for a While
1. Time Flies
2. Just Have a Good Time
3. Million Miles Away
4. A Chance to Change
5. Final Boarding Call
6. Gone for a While
7. Behind Your Sunglasses
8. These Kids Your Parents Warned You About
9. Come Closer
10. Set the World on Fire
11. Waiting For So Long (feat. Justin Schlosberg from Hell Is For Heroes)
2018: Sapere Aude
1. Nobody Moves Like You
2. The Best Is yet to Come (feat. Liam Cormier)
3. Need
4. Wild Life
5. Carry On
6. Over the Fence
7. Waiting for the Day
8. The Whole City Burns
9. Evil Stackholders
10. Sapere Aude
2022: Trapped
1. Threatened Generation (avec Hanabie.)
2. Good Intentions (avec Drew York)
3. Not The Only One
4. Happy Ending
5. Born To Be Great (avec Mat Bastard et Skip The Use)
6. Not So Innocent
7. Freedom Is A Movement
8. Trapped
9. Fair Weather Friend
10. No Place Like Home

=== EPs ===
2011: I'm Not Insane
1. I'm Not Insane
2. Left for Dead
3. This Is What You Deserve
4. What Would You Say If the World Was Listening?
