= La Maroquinerie =

Coordinates: 48°52′07″N 2°23′31″E

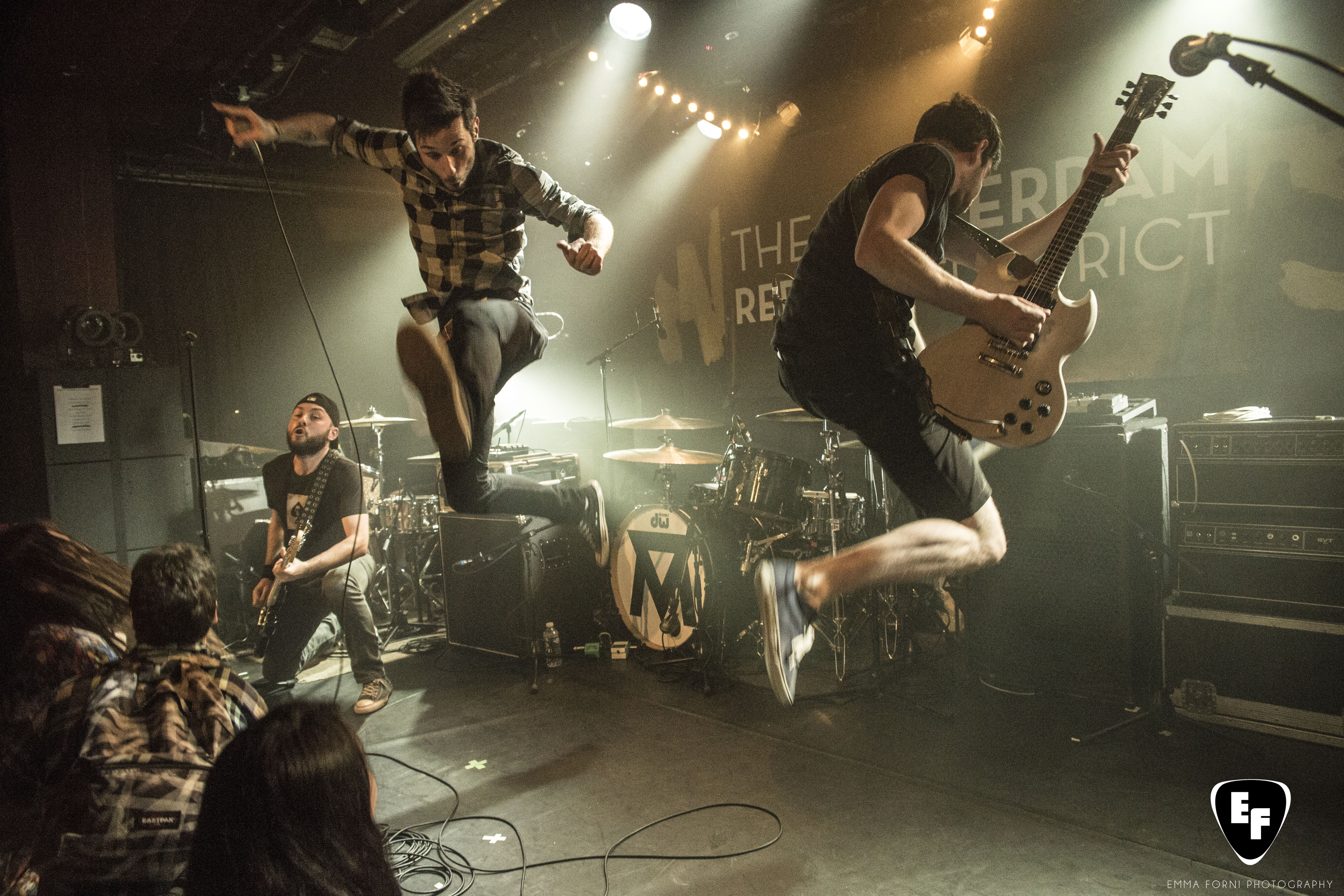
The band TARLD in concert at La Maroquinerie on 10 March 2015 opening for the band Marmozets.

La Maroquinerie is a concert venue and restaurant located at 23 Rue Boyer in the 20th arrondissement of Paris.

== History ==
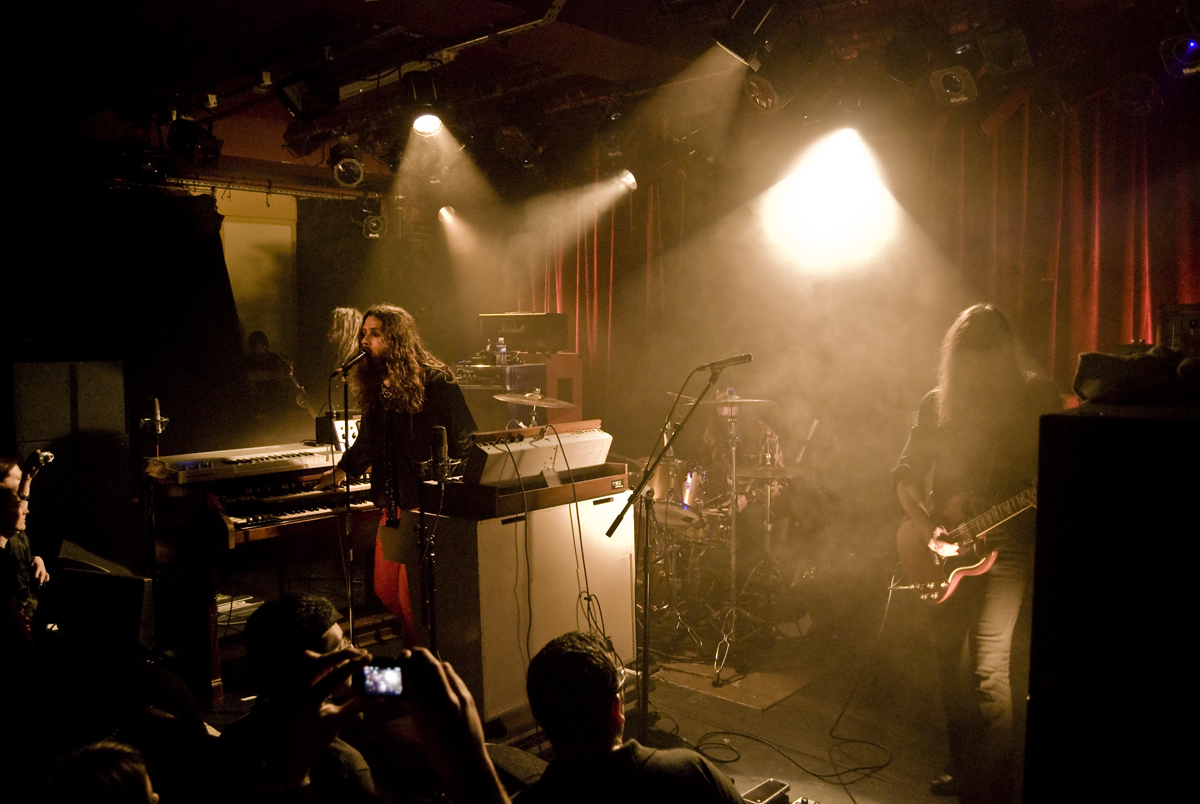
Bigelf in concert at La Maroquinerie in 2010.

La Maroquinerie is located at 23 Rue Boyer in the 20th arrondissement of Paris. The venue has existed since 1997 and includes a hall with a capacity of 500 people, as well as a restaurant-bar that is open every evening. Its name is derived from the French word for leather crafting, and La Maroquinerie is housed in a former leather workshop.

The geographer Anne Clerval notes that La Maroquinerie is situated in a neighborhood undergoing gentrification and serves as an example of the transformation of an industrial site into a trendy artistic venue. Sociologists Michel Pinçon and Monique Pinçon-Charlot also highlight the working-class past of this location.

It is a private establishment holding a DRAC license 1 for live performances.

== Lineup ==
The musical lineup is "eclectic": rock, indie, electro, folk, and also reggae, funk, and world music. Many contemporary French artists have performed there, including Les Ogres de Barback, Les Troubadours du désordre, Kent, Olivia Ruiz, Eiffel, Sinsemilia, as well as British rock bands like The Kooks and Kasabian.

Coldplay, who had not yet released their first album at the time, gave a concert there in spring 2000.

Lomepal performed the second date of his "ghost tour" for Mauvais Ordre on 18 September 2022.

== See also ==
- List of theatres and entertainment venues in Paris

== Bibliography ==
- Grégoire, Marion; Doussot, Michel; Lemeunier, Coline; Ejzenberg, Julie (2009). Le Petit Futé, Paris. Paris: Le Petit Futé. p. 528. ISBN 978-2-7469-2442-0. accessed 26 Mai 2011
