= Europe 2 =

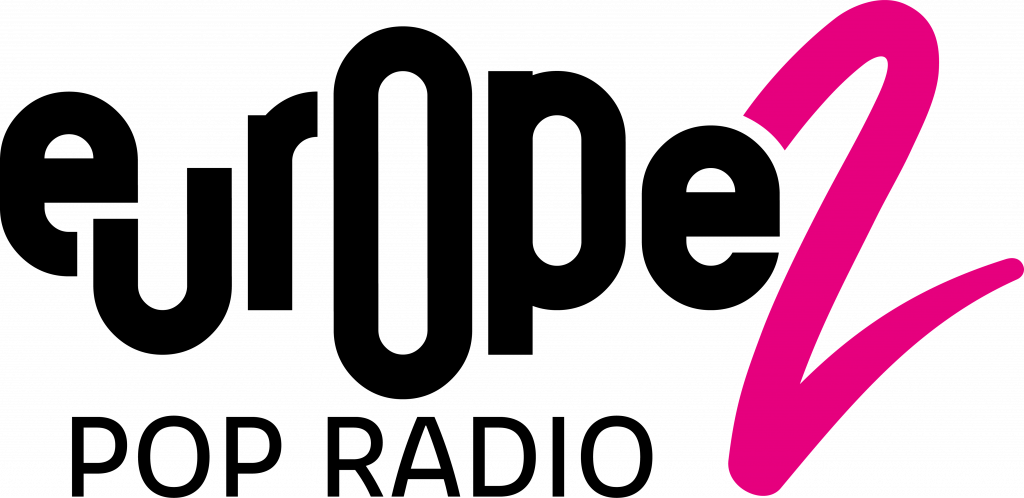
- France
- Broadcast area: France (National)
- Frequencies: 103.5 MHz (Paris); 100.3 MHz (Lyon); 102.3 MHz (Marseille)
- RDS: EUROPE_2

Programming
- Format: CHR

Ownership
- Owner: Lagardère News
- Sister stations: Europe 1 RFM

History
- First air date: December 1, 1986; 39 years ago

Links
- Website: www.europe2.fr

Europe 2 is a French music radio network that is owned by Lagardère. It was originally launched in 1986. In January 2008, the network's name was changed to Virgin Radio. In 2023, it reverted to its original name.

The network broadcasts on FM (frequency modulation) nationwide. Some independent radio stations are also affiliated to Europe 2. They air their own regional programming aside from the network's main schedule.

== History (2007 to 2014 and 2017 to 2020) ==
=== 2007 ===
On July 17, 2007, the CSA accepted the name change from Europe 2 to Virgin Radio. Lagardère Active, owner of the radio and TV station, has undertaken not to broadcast any advertising messages for other products of the Virgin group, nor to refer to them during broadcasts. This request was first contested in court by the radios NRJ and Skyrock, but their request was rejected.

=== 2008 ===
On January 1, 2008, at midnight, following the Happy Rock Hours, the best of 2007 show, Europe 2 officially became Virgin Radio after the broadcast of a brief history retracing the history of Europe 2, and the top launch times announced by Richard Branson. To inaugurate this new station, DJ Zebra hosted the first 6 hours of the air. The rest of the program schedule is almost identical to that of Europe 2.

In July 2008, Virgin Radio was managed by Jean-Christophe Lestra (managing director of the Lagardère musical radios pole and also President of Lagardère Active Radio International) and Sam Zniber (Director of musical radios programs de Lagardère and Vice-President Programming of Lagardère Active Radio International). A few days after the radio polls concerning the period March – April 2008, on July 26, Virgin Radio decided to part with the slogan Get more.

At the start of the 2008 school year, several key figures from Europe 2 left the station. They include the animators Nagui and Manu, which are replaced by Cauet, who is back on the air with Le morning de Cauet, the host Kash, who joins NRJ to replace Bruno Guillon at the head of 6/9 and Albert after eight years spent at the two stations, also leaving for NRJ. The slogan changed (Rock Star Music) as well as the skin. Bruno Guillonalso arrives from NRJ 6/9, with Camille Combal, on the station at the end of the afternoon. They animated "Le 17/20". Bruno Guillon therefore exchanges his place with Kash. On December 23, 2008, Éric Madelon left the station, giving way to Clément, coming from the show called Talk on Fun Radio.

=== 2009 ===
On April 29, 2009, Gaël Sanquer from Fun Radio, where he held the post of head of channel and head of musical programming, was appointed director of programs for Virgin Radio.

In June 2009, Jean-Pierre Sablier and Sébastien Cauet presented their last show. In the weekend of July 11 and 12, 2009, Léo Lanvin and DJ Zebra also make their last after being respectively 12 and 18 months on Virgin Radio. Between July 1 and 15, 2009, three new hosts arrived on Virgin Radio: Déborah Grunwald (ex Fun Radio), David Mantaul alias "Ti 'Dav "(ex Skyrock), and Léo Cuenca (ex Radio FG). On July 31, 2009, at 9 pm, Sébastien Séfrin definitely turned the page on Virgin Radio after 13 seasons of presence.

On August 24, 2009, Bruno Guillon, Christina Guilloton and Arthur Pillu-Périer recover the morning with the eponymous program Bruno Guillon, from 5:30 a.m. to 9:00 am, replacing Cauet, while Camille Combal hosts the after-work from 6:00 p.m. to 8:00 p.m. with "Camille Combal and her orchestra" .

Beginning December 2009, Sam Zniber is replaced by Jean Isnard at the head of Virgin Radio. This is the third direction in two years of existence. During the whole month of December 2009, listeners were able to vote for the 100 songs pop rock from 2000s. On January 1, 2010, the results were revealed with a landslide victory for the group Muse (four titles in the top 7 rankings, including the first three places).

=== 2010 ===
In 2010, Lagardère sold the Virgin 17 channel to Bolloré, which replaced it on 1 September by Direct Star.

Beginning August 2010, Deborah leaves the station. Gaël Sanquer also, joining NRJ, he is replaced by Denis Rostagnat (ex: NRJ Group and Rouge FM). Florian Gazan, another flagship host of 6/9 sur NRJ, joined Bruno Guillon at the morning, now broadcast from 5 a.m. to 9 a.m. Arthur Pillu-Périer, on the contrary, leaves Bruno Guillon for the program Camille Combal et son orchester, now broadcast from 5 p.m. to 8 p.m. then, during the year, from 5 p.m. to 7 p.m. h.

On September 1, 2010, the inter-union of Virgin Radio and RFM called on the employees to strike to denounce a plan to massively close the local stations of these 2 stations. This is a historic first since the creation of the group.

Faced with the collapse of the audience since the beginning of 2010, the choice is made to abandon the pop rock format and add dance and R'n'B in the playlist and increase rotations.

=== 2011 ===
As of January 3, 2011, the slogan changed for the fifth time since the creation of the radio station and became "Un MaXx' de Tubes", a slogan already used by Europe 2 a few years earlier.

Denis Rostagnat left as program director at the beginning of April. He was replaced by Thomas Plessis, also director of radio programs and internet development at Lagardère Active Radio International. The latter left in May 2012 to join Cyril Hanouna on the channel D8 and devote himself to his production activities. He was replaced by Roberto Ciurleo.

Between 2010 and 2011, the distribution of dance titles increased by 22%.

In July 2011, after three seasons with Virgin Radio, Bruno Guillon and his team joined Fun Radio to replace Manu in the morning; it is also the departure of Ti'Dav for the Mouv ', of Thomas Caussé for OÜI FM, and especially of Philippe Despont who after 13 years with Europe 2 and Virgin Radio joined RFM to liven up weekend mornings. At the start of the 2011 school year, it was Cyril Hanouna who hosted "Hanouna le matin" with Énora Malagré, a defector from NRJ. For his part, Camille Combal hosts the "Soir Show" from 9 pm to midnight.

=== 2012 ===
Beginning June 2012, the group Lagardère Active announces its intention to sell all or part of the capital of Virgin Radio, whose audiences are in free fall. Goom Radio, bouquet of webradio s expressed interest in a takeover of Virgin Radio, but the operation was ultimately unsuccessful.

At the end of the 2011–2012 season, Greg di Mano left Virgin Radio, Léo Cuenca joined RFM, Camille Combal saw his program "Le Soir Show" stop for lack of audiences sufficient. On August 27, 2012, Cyril Hanouna leaves for a second season of Hanouna le matin with a renewed team while a new musical show, Le Lab, hosted by Double F, airs every evening between 9 p.m. and 2 am. The grid will run for several months with a very small number of animators. On this occasion, the radio adopts a new slogan: The Pop Music Playlist.

=== 2013 ===
A new schedule has been set up on February 26, 2013, and allows the return of Albert Spano, a former host of Europe 2. He takes the 9h / 13h box. The evenings of the weekend are animated by DJ Zébra, who also makes his return.

On March 28, 2013, Denis Olivennes, chairman of Lagardère Active, which owns Virgin Radio, declares that a takeover offer for 20% of the capital of the radio had been made by NRJ, but no firm offer had been received, and Virgin Radio was no longer for sale.

In June 2013, after two seasons in the morning program, Cyril Hanouna announced his departure for Europe 1. The end of the season also marks the departure of Double F, which ends ten years of airing on Europe 2-Virgin Radio. On August 26, 2013, two new shows were aired: first Virgin Tonic hosted by Christophe Beaugrand and Florian Gazan, and then also "Enora in the evening", a free antenna hosted by Énora Malagré.

The resort's slogan is evolving. The Pop Music playlist becomes the Pop-Rock-Electro playlist but despite this, audiences continue to decline with only 4.1% in November 2013.

=== 2014 ===
On March 5, 2014, on radio, the station inaugurates a new studio, Studio Indochine.

On March 20, 2014, on radio, the station launches into television. Lagardère Active after having sold the channel Virgin 17 to Bolloré is launching a new low-cost channel, capturing radio broadcasts and broadcasting together, the budget of which should not exceed two million euros per year. It is present on the internet as well as on ADSL networks. The channel broadcasts concerts, film clips and music videos. The station should also get closer to the group Melty and create around thirty web TV on YouTube.

In May 2014, following poor audiences, the show Énora le Soir was reduced by one hour while Jean-Michel Maire joined the 'team. On July 4, 2014, Albert Spano left Virgin Radio for the second time after 16 months at 9 am / 1 pm to join RFM, to host this same time slot. At the same time, DJ Zebra is leaving the station while Christophe Beaugrand joins RTL. On August 25, 2014, Camille Combal is back to host the second season of Virgin Tonic with Laure Cohen and Clément Lanoue.

=== 2017 ===
On June 29, 2017, Camille Combal announces that he is back for a final season at the head of Virgin Tonic with Clément / Nico / Ginger and Mélanie. On July 2, 2017, Lionel, emblematic host of the station, announces his departure from the station for the reason that he is planning a trip around the world. On July 7, 2017, Morgan, host of 4 to 9 p.m. on Virgin Radio national, announces his departure from the station to join Mouv '. His replacement is known, it will be Victor, host of Virgin Radio Provence. Cauet announced on August 21, 2017, on his Facebook page that he will be host from 6 p.m. / 9 p.m. from August 29 on Virgin Radio with the name issue "Cauet let go ".

=== 2018 ===
Camille Combal takes over for (finally) a new season (5) of Virgin Tonic between 7 am and 10 am with Ginger, Nico, Clément and Mélanie. Lionel Virgile takes the 10 am – 12 midday on weekdays in place of Pierre-Alex who is transferred in the morning of the weekend 6 am – 12 midday Marion returns to her place a year ago at 12 midday – 4 p.m. Victor takes over from the 4 pm with the local national program until 8 pm (instead of Cauet who returned to him on NRJ). Also with Victor from 8 p.m. to 9 p.m. it's Top VirginRadio and from 9 p.m. to midnight it's WorldOfPop.

=== 2019 ===
Virgin Radio TV was shut down on 1 July 2019, during the sale of Lagardère TV activities to Groupe M6.

Camille Combal is still there for the sixth season of Virgin Tonic between 7 a.m. and 10 a.m. always with Ginger, Nico, Clément and Mélanie. Lionel Virgile and Marion left the station to devote themselves to other projects, they are replaced by Paul de Montreuil (ex. Radio FG) from 10 am to 12 midday and Julien (ex. Mouv) from 12 midday to 4 pm. The local program is maintained from 4 p.m. to 8 pm, in National with Victor who is also responsible for Le Top VirginRadio from 8 p.m. to 9 p.m. finally the 9 pm – 12 midnight of the station is provided by Amandine with the best of the morning.

=== 2020 ===
In September, Camille Combal gave way to Manu Payet for the seventh season of Virgin Tonic, while keeping his team (Ginger, Nico, Clément and Mélanie).

=== 2022 ===
Virgin Radio wants to become Europe 2 again.

Virgin Tonic will end on July 1, 2022, and be succeeded by Le Morning sans filtre (The Morning without filter).

=== 2023 ===
On 1 January 2023, Europe 2 returns.

=== Logos ===
Old logo of Europe 2 from August 22, 2005, until December 31, 2007.

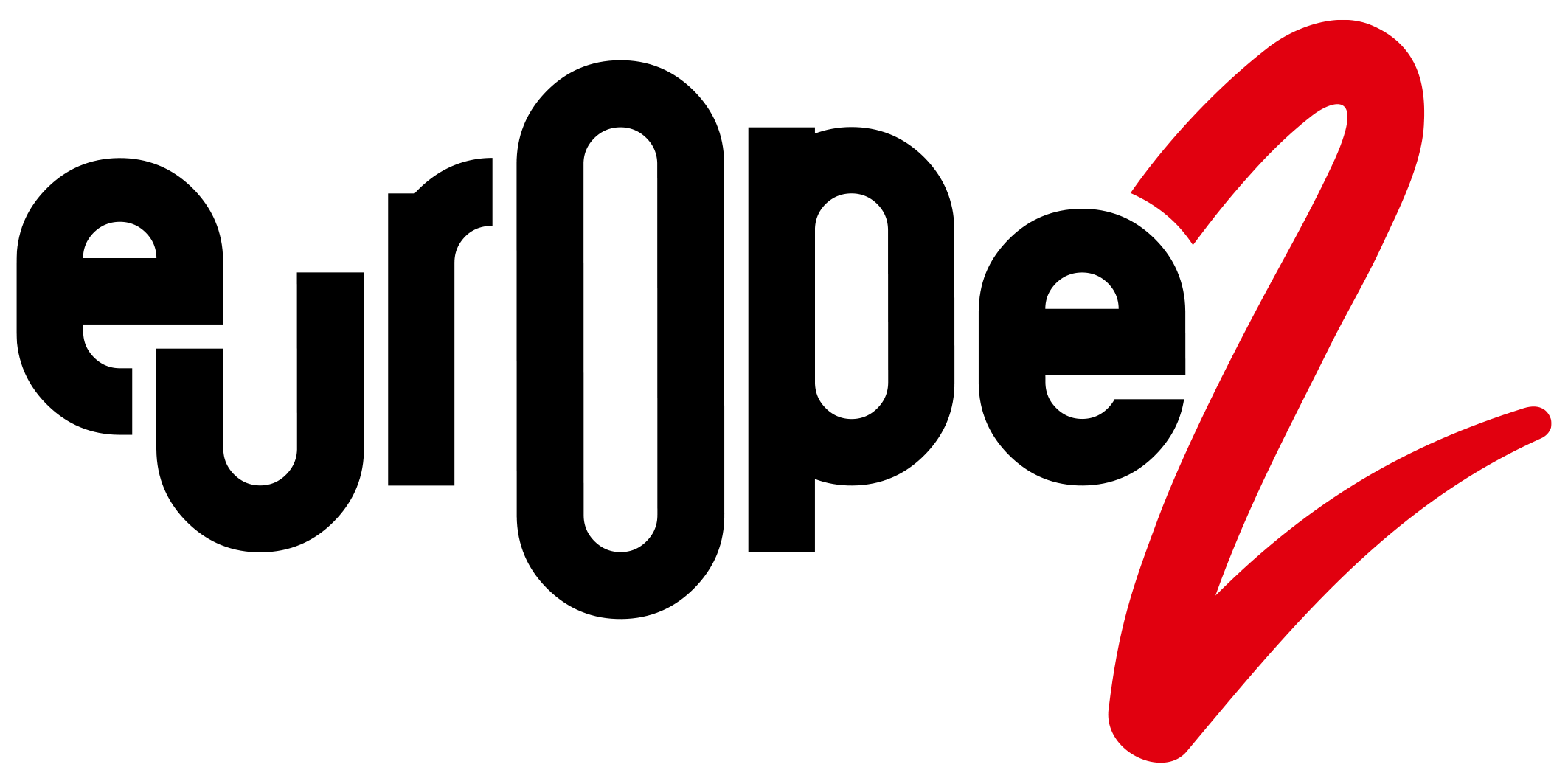
Old logo of Europe 2 from January 1, 2023, until July 10, 2024.
