= Mélanie Bauer =

- Born: 1970 (age 55–56)
- Citizenship: French
- Occupation: Radio presenter
- Organisation(s): Demain.TV, Oüi FM, Radio Nova, France Inter
- Website: http://www.melaniebauer.fr

Mélanie Bauer (born in 1970) is a French radio and television presenter, specializing in music, particularly rock.

== Biography ==
At the same time as her studies at the French École des nouveaux métiers de la communication (1990–1991) and Studio école de France (1991–1993), Mélanie Bauer worked in the studios of Fréquence Gaie (later Radio FG), when she was only 19 years old.

In 1992, she joined Oüi FM and hosted the show Ketchup & Marmelade for 10 years. During this time, starting in 1993 and for six years, she worked at M6 for the shows Fanzine, Plus vite que la musique (with Christophe Crénel), and Fan de (with Séverine Ferrer). In 2002, she continued with FIP, then France 4 (2004–2005) with En direct de…, a show about festivals.

In 2004, she joined Radio Nova. Starting in 2006, she hosted the music show L'Éléphant effervescent, a daily cultural magazine broadcast in the late afternoon. The show was removed from Nova's schedule in 2012 and reappeared, still under her leadership, periodically on television on the channel Demain TV. In the meantime, she remained on Nova where she took over La French Pop, a show about French music that she hosted in English. In September 2014, still on Nova, she co-hosted the morning show La Nouvelle Internationale with Thierry Paret.

Starting in 2015, she collaborated with France Inter, first as the producer of a summer show, C'est extra, then as a regular columnist on the show Si tu écoutes, j'annule tout from September, an activity she continued in Par Jupiter ! when the show changed its name in 2017. In 2016, she produced the music show Back To Back. In 2017, she hosted some Concerts d'Inter.

On television, she has also been seen on Canal Jimmy, MCE, MCM, and MTV. In print media, she did some freelance work for the magazine L'ŒIL in 2012.

She also composes songs. and is a singer and guitarist in a group called Grumpy, but she feels she doesn't have the talent to be a musician.

In 2013, she summarized her career as follows: "journalist, radio host, TV joker, lousy singer, and nice left-wing girl". On her Twitter account, she describes herself as "mother."
