= MCM Pop =

French music television channel

- Country: France

Programming
- Language: French

Ownership
- Owner: Groupe M6

History
- Launched: 28 November 2003; 22 years ago
- Closed: 2 October 2014; 11 years ago (France)
- Replaced by: RFM TV
- Former names: MCM 2 (2001-2003)

MCM Pop is a French music video TV channel owned by Groupe M6. MCM Pop was rebranded RFM TV, on 2 October 2014 at 6pm.

== History ==
- On 3 April 2001, MCM 2 was created by Groupe MCM, then co-owned by Lagardère Active and Groupe Canal+. The string then diffuses clips from the 1980s and 90s and target the generation that experienced the beginnings of MCM.
- To enrich the offered music channels, Lagardère Active launches November 28, 2003 MCM Music + channels. It is then composed of three channels: MCM, MCM Top (newly created), and MCM Pop, replacing MCM 2. Then, latter MCM Pop broadcasts clips from the 1980s to today and extend its program schedule.
- Since 29 March 2011, the channel broadcasts in 16:9 format
- On 2 October 2014, MCM Pop was replaced by RFM TV, adopting the brand of the radio station RFM, due to their similar positioning, allowing to add a strong brand in the MCM Premium offering to clarify and strengthen it, and improving the notoriety for their brands that builds advertiser loyalty, continuing the strategy initiated that year with the creation of Virgin Radio TV in March.
- In Portugal, the channel stays MCM Pop, where another radio station already use the name RFM.

=== Slogans ===
From 2010 to October 2014:« Le meilleur des années 80 à nos jours » ("The best of the '80s to today")

== Мanagement ==
- Secretary General, Programs and Antennas: Laurent Micouleau
- Program Director: Nicolas Gicquel
- Presenter and journalist: François Olivier Nolorgues

== Programming blocks ==
- Hit RFM
- Pop List
- Pop Tonic
- Pop Legend
- Pop 80
- Pop 90
- Pop 2000
- Pop Kitsch
- Dance 90
- Top 50 Culte
- Pop Culte
- Pop Rock
- Pop Dance
- Pop Tendance
- Pop Disco
- Pop & Co
- Émissions diffusées sur MCM
