= Dom Kiris =

French radio host

- Occupation: Radio presenter

Dom Kiris, whose real name is Dominique Le Bourhis, is a French radio presenter and musician.

== Biography ==
Dom Kiris is the long-time host of the Paris rock radio station Oüi FM. He joined as a columnist at its creation in 1987. He hosts the Café gourmand show from Monday to Friday from 1pm to 4pm and Au secours, c'est du live! on Sundays from 8pm to 10pm. In 2009, he was one of the few long-time hosts to keep his position after Arthur acquired Oüi FM. Since 2016, he also hosts the monthly show Littéralement rock on Sundays, also on Oüi FM.

Dom Kiris commented live on the French Open matches of Roland-Garros 2011 for Radio Roland-Garros.

Dom Kiris is also a musician in the duo Les Troubadours du désordre, which he formed with Mademoiselle Chomb. In May 2016, Dom Kiris was featured in an animated clip by Marky Ramone, I want my beer.

== Other roles ==
- President of the association Pirates Production

== Hosted shows ==
- Qui veut la peau de Guy l'Américain on Oüi FM
- Café gourmand from Monday to Friday, 1pm to 4pm on Oüi FM
- Au secours, c'est du live ! on Sundays, 8pm to 10pm on Oüi FM
- Littéralement rock on Sunday at 1pm on Oüi FM

== Works ==
- Dom Kiris; Gilles Verlant (2008). Guitares et guitaristes de légende (in French). Paris: Éditions Fetjaine. p. 127. ISBN 978-2-35425-069-0.
- Dom Kiris; Alain Dellemotte; Michel Larrieu (2010). Culture rock : pop, soul, metal, reggae, 1000 questions pour tester vos connaissances (in French). Paris: Éditions Fetjaine. p. 205. ISBN 978-2-35425-178-9.
- Dom Kiris (2011). Rock collection (1950-2010). Éditions Fetjaine. p. 139. ISBN 978-2-35425-238-0.
- Dom Kiris, Cult rock : Les 101 objets qui ont marqué l'histoire du rock, GM Éditions, 2016 ISBN 979-1092730562
