= Christophe Crénel =

French radio host

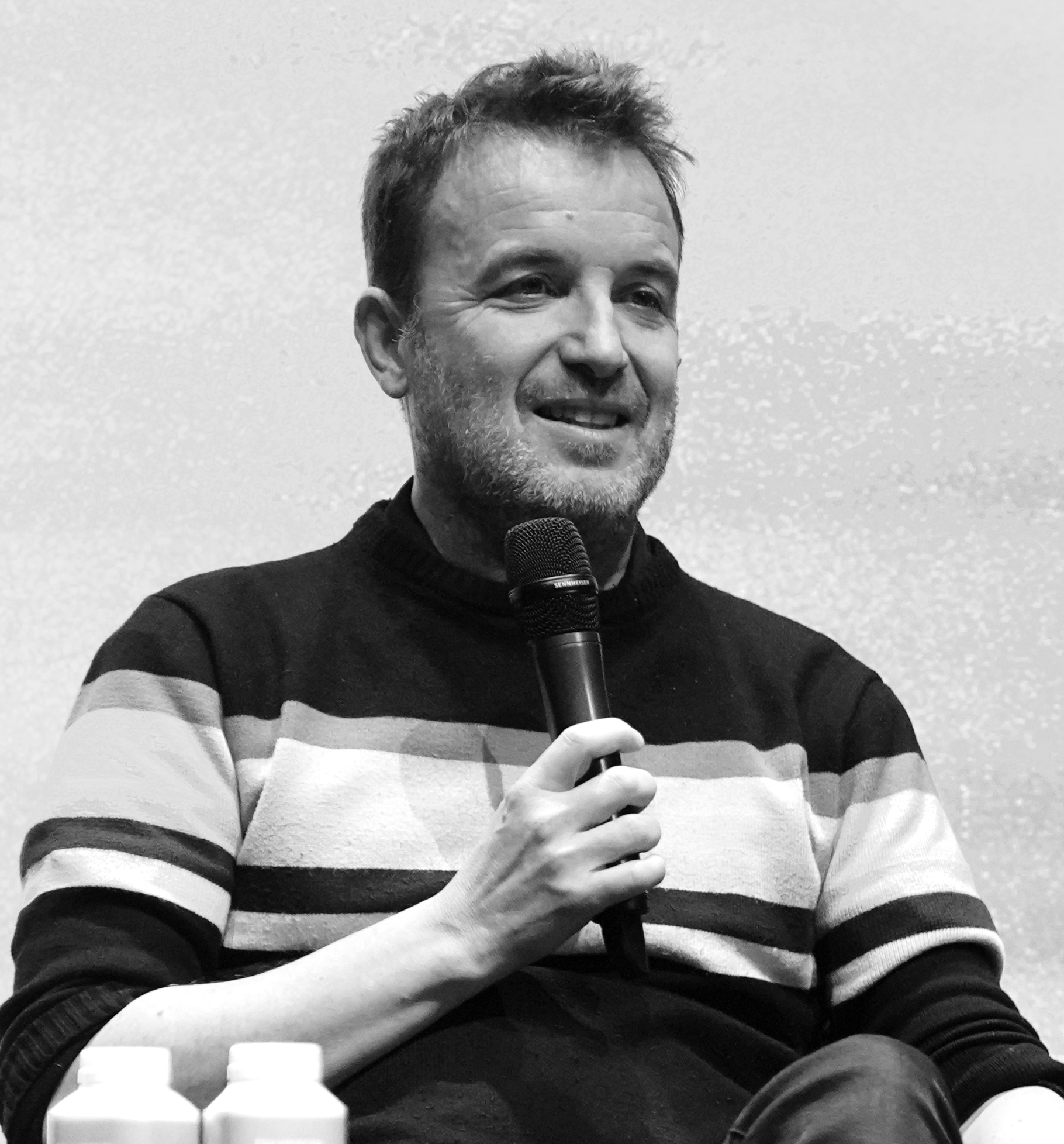
- Occupations: Journalist; Television presenter, radio personality, photographer, musician
- Employer(s): Le Chantier, Mouv', Oüi FM, France Info, France Inter, M6, M6 Music

Christophe Crénel is a journalist, radio and television host, photographer, and French musician born on September 2, 1964.

He worked as a journalist for France Info and was also a radio host on Oüi FM, France Inter, and Mouv', as well as a columnist for France Musique. He was also a prominent figure on the television channel M6, where he presented music shows such as Culture Rock, Fanzine, and Plus vite que la musique between 1994 and 1999.

As a musician (singer-guitarist), he released an album called Tous Superman with the group Amok, an EP titled Every little moment with the electro project Popelek, and a record called Universale douleur with the electronic rock project Juge Fulton featuring Arnaud Cessinas from Les Sales Majestés.

As a photographer, he created two photo exhibitions based on his visits to New York City: Macadam Cow Boy. In 2021, he published Big Bang, Musiciens du nouveau monde, a book about the new French music scene (Les éditions Braquage), accompanied by an exhibition at Café de la Danse in Paris.

== Biography ==
=== Beginnings ===
Trained in journalism, radio hosting, and technical radio at Studio Ecole de France in Issy-les-Moulineaux, Crénel began his career as a journalist at RMC Proche Orient in 1985 during a period marked by turmoil (the Lebanese Civil War, French hostage crisis, and Iran–Iraq War).

In 1988, he moved to Radio France where he became one of the youngest presenters for France Info. He worked there for six years on the continuous news radio station, during which he shared his passion for music through a weekly column called Toute la musique.

=== Television ===
In 1993, Crénel made his television debut on M6. He began as a journalist and host in the morning show "the little channel that's on the rise!"

He was then entrusted with presenting and serving as editor-in-chief of the show Fanzine, followed by Plus Vite Que La Musique (Faster Than Music), two music magazines where his unique and educational tone quickly became recognizable. Plus Vite Que La Musique earned him the title of "Teleman of the Year" by L'année du disque in 1999. He was also a key figure in the launch of M6 Music and co-hosted their daily show (Flash), which won the Ithème award for best music magazine twice (1999 and 2001). He has also presented the show Culture Rock.

Since 2005, he has been the voiceover for the trailers on W9, a channel from the M6 Group.

He co-wrote, with director Marc-Aurèle Vecchione, the documentary Cheveux en Bataille (Hair in Battle), which was broadcast on Arte in spring 2015.

=== Radio ===
From September 1988 to September 1994, Crénel was a journalist at France Info where he served as chief editor, managing editor, and news presenter during various time slots.

In 2002, he joined the radio station Oüi FM where he hosted various shows, including Aoow every morning for two years. He also presented a daily music magazine called Spoutnik for over six years, featuring new trends in rock and hosting acts such as Air, The Ting Tings, Phoenix, Franz Ferdinand, Justice, Bloc Party, Sébastien Tellier, and many others.

In early 2009, around the time Arthur took over the station, he moved to Mouv' where he became "the weekend's free agent." He presented several music news programs there (Crénel United, Rodéo, and le 16/20 du Week end). During summer 2013, he also hosted Le Grand Live d'Inter as a replacement for Pont des Artistes. Starting the fall of 2014, he was also a columnist on France Musique during Vincent Josse's morning show.

From February to late June 2015, he hosted the show La Sélection électro 2.0 on Mouv' every Monday from 11 pm to midnight. Then, between September and late December 2015, he hosted La Sélection électro Hip-Hop on Sunday evenings. Starting January 2016, he was no longer part of Mouv's programming schedule.

=== Other activities ===
In 2005, he published a book about The Police and Sting with Librio.

Passionate about rock music and involved in numerous bands since his teenage years, he released an album called Tous Superman with his band Amok in October 2006. In 2002, he also released an electropop EP under the name Popelek with his partner Matteox. The single Every little moment was released through WEA and Boogie Kat; another track from this EP appears on the soundtrack of David Oelhoffen's Nos retrouvailles, featuring Jacques Gamblin and presented during the Critics' Week at the Cannes Film Festival in 2007. He was also involved, alongside Arnaud Cessinas from Les Sales Majestés, in the album Universale Douleur by Juge Fulton, released at the end of 2007 through Musicast. Additionally, he produced the live DVD Week-end Sauvage by Les Sales Majestés, released in November 2008.

For several years now, Crénel has also gained attention as a photographer, with many published photos from the music world he is part of and two exhibitions on New York during the context of the 2008 and 2012 U.S. presidential elections (Macadam Cowboy).

== Publications ==
- Crénel, Christophe (2005). The Police et Sting (in French). Paris: Groupe Flammarion. p. 92. ISBN 2-290-34448-6.
- Belhaddad, Souâd; Besse, Marc; Crénel, Christophe; Cuesta, Stan; Dordor, Francis (2007). Rock altermondialiste : Manu Chao et la Mano negra, Bob Marley, Noir désir, The Police et Sting, U2 (in French). Paris: Scali. p. 515. ISBN 978-2-35012-098-0.
