= Heated Rivalry (soundtrack) =

Heated Rivalry (Original Series Soundtrack)

Soundtrack album by Peter Peter
- Released: January 16, 2026
- Genres: Film score; electronic; techno; ambient
- Length: 71:19
- Label: Milan
- Producer: Peter Peter

Peter Peter chronology
Éther (2024)	Heated Rivalry (Original Series Soundtrack) (2026)

Singles from Heated Rivalry (Original Series Soundtrack)
- 1. "Rivalry" Released: January 9, 2026; 2. "It's You" Released: January 9, 2026

Heated Rivalry (Original Series Soundtrack) is the score composed by the Canadian musician Peter Peter to the sports romance television series Heated Rivalry. The score was released through Milan Records on January 16, 2026. It marked Peter Peter's scoring debut, and won him Best Original Music (Drama) at the 14th Canadian Screen Awards. The soundtrack reached the top 10 on the charts in Australia, Austria, Canada, Germany, the United States and Wallonia.

== Background and production ==
Heated Rivalry marked Peter Peter's first major original score for a television series. He was chosen by the series creator Jacob Tierney after Tierney listened to his 2024 album Éther. Production hired Peter Peter early in the series' development; he was introduced to Tierney during pre-production and given access to early script drafts, enabling him to begin conceptual work before any footage was shot. He initially composed and produced multiple demo pieces solely from the script material; however, after viewing the first visual footage he determined that most of these early ideas did not suit the tone of the finished scenes and chose to discard them. He retained only two thematic ideas and a limited set of synthesizer sounds from that phase.

Once the final edited footage (picture lock) was available, Peter Peter began composing directly to picture. His process involved first determining the precise tempo required for each scene using Logic Pro as his primary digital audio workstation, which he synchronized with an external MIDI sequencer, drum machines, and various analog and digital synthesizers. Rather than relying on pre-programmed MIDI sequences, he improvised with his equipment while watching the visuals, recording takes when the musical ideas matched the scene's emotional and rhythmic cues. After receiving the picture-locked video files for each episode, he had approximately ten days per episode to deliver fully completed compositions and final productions, a turnaround he described as unusually short compared with his previous work.

== Composition ==
Peter Peter composed the series' score, which critics described as "sexy, connected and ambient", as well as "buzzy" and synth-driven, recalling his signature electronic soundscapes. The album opens with "Rivalry", the series' theme song. Rebecca Alter of Vulture characterized the instrumental techno track as "Challengers-esque".

"Melt", the second track, accompanies a locker-room scene in which the protagonists shower together in the episode "Rookies". The piece is built around ambient drone textures and features "icy sounding" synthesizers that build to a crescendo.

"It's You", the album's sole track with lyrics, was described as "slow and dreamy". Its lyrics "evoke Jane and Lily's distinctively monosyllabic texting style", referencing the female aliases the protagonists adopt when saving each other's phone numbers for the first time. The song accompanies their first instance of anal sex in the episode "Olympians". Peter Peter initially used his 2024 song "Lisbonne" as a temp track before composing "It's You", processing his own and his girlfriend's vocals to produce a sound similar to "Hide and Seek" (2005) by Imogen Heap.

"Inferno", which also appears in the episode "Olympians", accompanies a sexually explicit scene involving power-play dynamics. The track was described as a slow techno composition with a tempo of 90–100 beats per minute.

== Release ==
On January 9, 2026, Peter Peter released the tracks "Rivalry" and "It's You" as a double lead single from the album, which was scheduled for release later that month. On January 13, Billboard revealed the tracklist and announced that its digital edition would be released on January 16. The CD and LP editions were subsequently released on July 10.

The physical edition was issued as a two-CD set and in two colored-vinyl variants. In addition to Peter Peter's original score, the physical releases feature songs used in the series, including Feist's "My Moon My Man", Cailin Russo's "Bad Things", Wet Leg's "Mangetout", Wolf Parade's "I'll Believe in Anything", and t.A.T.u.'s "All the Things She Said". They also include the previously unreleased bonus track "One Soul (Cottage Mix)" by Peter, which was featured in the series. Both the CD and vinyl editions include a fold-out poster and liner notes written by Tierney. The vinyl editions also contain two collectible trading cards.

== Commercial performance ==
Following the release of its CD and vinyl editions, the album entered several national album charts. In the United States, it debuted at number eight on the Billboard 200 chart dated July 25, 2026, with 41,000 album-equivalent units. It also debuted at number one on the Top Soundtracks and Top Vinyl Albums charts and at number two on the Top Album Sales chart. The album became the first television soundtrack to debut within the top 10 of the Billboard 200 in more than a decade, following the soundtrack to the first season of Fox's Empire in 2015. Vinyl sales accounted for 28,000 of the album's first-week units, representing the largest sales week for a soundtrack on vinyl in 2026.

In Canada, where the series originated, the album debuted at number eight on the Billboard Canadian Albums chart. Outside North America, it also reached the top 10 in Australia, Austria, Germany, and Wallonia, and entered the top 40 in Finland, Hungary, New Zealand, and Switzerland, among other territories. It also topped the UK Soundtrack Albums Chart.

== Accolades ==
Award	Year	Category	Nominee	Result	Ref.
Canadian Screen Awards	2026	Best Original Music, Drama	Peter Peter	Won	
Canadian Screen Awards	2026	Best Original Music – Original Song	"It's You"	Won	

== Track listing ==
All tracks are written by and produced by Peter Peter.

Heated Rivalry (Original Series Soundtrack) digital track listing
No.	Title	Length
1.	"Rivalry"	2:11
2.	"Melt"	1:26
3.	"Those English Words Just Roll Off Your Tongue"	2:52
4.	"Heartbeat I"	1:30
5.	"Face-off"	1:18
6.	"Common Goal"	1:41
7.	"Jane & Lily"	1:40
8.	"Two Souls"	3:54
9.	"Heartbeat II"	1:54
10.	"It's You"	4:00
11.	"Shivers from the Past"	1:50
12.	"Spring"	0:45
13.	"I Want to Win"	2:11
14.	"Let's Make a Deal"	2:54
15.	"Inferno"	4:26
16.	"Fire Escape"	2:45
17.	"Young and Restless I"	0:41
18.	"La nuit est longue"	3:11
19.	"Young and Restless II"	2:43
20.	"You Slowly Dissipate"	2:39
21.	"Strangers on the Ice"	0:46
22.	"Dark Glow"	0:54
23.	"Utopie I"	0:36
24.	"Din of Your Voice"	1:04
25.	"Heartbeat III"	2:51
26.	"Flatline"	1:26
27.	"Distant Rivalry"	1:46
28.	"Text Me Whenever"	1:01
29.	"Heartbeat IV"	1:38
30.	"Hollanov"	2:27
31.	"Trembling"	4:52
32.	"Everybody's Glory"	1:57
33.	"One Soul"	2:05
34.	"Utopie II"	1:25
Total length:		71:19

Heated Rivalry (Original Series Soundtrack) compact disc 1 track listing
No.	Title	Writer(s)	Producer(s)	Length
1.	"Une journée parfaite" (Dumas)	Steve Dumas; Jonathan Dauphinais; Étienne Dupuis-Cloutier; Dave Richard	Dauphinais; Dupuis-Cloutier	3:12
2.	"Mangetout" (Wet Leg)	Joshua Mobaraki; Rhian Teasdale	Dan Carey	3:24
3.	"Chelsea mon amour" (Philippe B)	Philippe Bergeron	Philippe Brault	3:52
4.	"Lips" (Baxter Dury)	Dury; Mike More	Dury; More	3:05
5.	"I'll Believe in Anything" (Wolf Parade)	Spencer Krug	Isaac Brock	4:36
6.	"My Moon My Man" (Feist)	Leslie Feist; Jason Charles Beck	Gonzales; Feist	3:48
7.	"C'est toi" (Satine)	Satine Wallé; Donnelli Djazouli Mehdi	Satine; Donnelli	1:58
8.	"All the Things She Said" (t.A.T.u.)	Sergio Galoyan; Trevor Horn; Martin Kierszenbaum; Valery Polienko; Elena Kiper	Horn	3:34
9.	"All the Things She Said" (Harrison)	Horn; Galoyan; Ivan Shapovalov; Kierszenbaum; Polienko; Kiper	Harrison Manley-Shaw	2:50
10.	"L'anarchie des jours heureux" (La Bronze)	Nadia Essadiqi; Samuel Laflamme	La Bronze	2:47
11.	"Bad Things" (Cailin Russo)	Russo; Gianluca Buccellati	The Invisible Men	3:36
12.	"One Soul" (Cottage Mix; Peter Peter)	Peter Peter	Peter Peter	2:19

- Disc 2 mirrors the digital track listing.

== Charts ==
=== Album charts ===
Chart performance for Heated Rivalry (Original Series Soundtrack)
Chart (2026)	Peak position
Australian Albums (ARIA)	3
Austrian Albums (Ö3 Austria)	7
Belgian Albums (Ultratop Flanders)	11
Belgian Albums (Ultratop Wallonia)	6
Canadian Albums (Billboard)	8
Danish Vinyl Albums (Hitlisten)	5
Dutch Albums (Album Top 100)	17
Finnish Albums (Suomen virallinen lista)	26
German Albums (Offizielle Top 100)	5
Hungarian Albums (MAHASZ)	34
Irish Compilation Albums (IRMA)	7
Italian Physical Albums (FIMI)	15
New Zealand Albums (RMNZ)	35
Polish Albums (ZPAV)	91
Swedish Physical Albums (Sverigetopplistan)	8
Swiss Albums (Schweizer Hitparade)	31
UK Compilation Albums (Official Charts)	3
UK Soundtrack Albums (Official Charts)	1
US Billboard 200	8
US Soundtrack Albums (Billboard)	1

=== Single charts ===
Chart performance for "It's You"
Chart (2026)	Peak position
New Zealand Hot Singles (RMNZ)	27
US Digital Song Sales (Billboard)	19

Chart performance for "Rivalry"
Chart (2026)	Peak position
New Zealand Hot Singles (RMNZ)	33
US Dance/Electronic Digital Songs (Billboard)	3

== Release history ==
Release dates and formats for Heated Rivalry (Original Series Soundtrack)
Region	Date	Format	Label	Ref.
Various	January 16, 2026	Digital download; streaming	Milan Records	
Various	July 10, 2026	CD; LP	Milan Records	

== See also ==
- "All the Things She Said"
