= Claire Arnoux =

French sports journalist and television presenter

- Born: 18 July 1984 (age 41); Paris, France
- Occupations: Sports journalist, television presenter
- Television: i-Télé (2009–2012); Direct Star (2011–2012); Eurosport (2011–2012); L'Équipe TV (2012–2015); BFM TV (2012–2015); BeIN Sports (2015–present)

Claire Arnoux (born 18 July 1984) is a French sports journalist and television presenter. She presents Salon VIP and Tribune Sports since 2015 on BeIN Sports.

== Early life and education ==
Claire Arnoux was born in Paris. From her parents, she is passioned by sport since her childhood, especially football, Formula One, boxing, and tennis. She also likes journalism, stating having "always wanted to become a journalist". At this occasion, she graduated with a DEUG of journalism at the Paris 8 University Vincennes-Saint-Denis, and then graduated with a master's degree of journalism and communications at the Sorbonne Nouvelle University Paris 3 two years later. She joined the Studio école de France in order to become a radio presenter. In parallel of her studies, she made her first professional experiences.

== Career on radio and television ==
Claire Arnoux began her career on radio on Sport FM, which has become Sport MX and then Europe 1 Sport. She then joined the redaction team of Infosport+.

She then began on television in 2009 on the channel i-Télé presenting the weekend sports journal. In 2011, she joined in parallel the channel Direct Star in Star Report, a program of infotainment, as well as Eurosport, where she takes part at the JT Sport.

In 2012, Claire Arnoux joined BFM TV and L'Équipe TV where she presented the program Sport buzz and a morning news on weekend. In 2015, she was hired by BeIN Sports. Since then, she presents Salon VIP, a program where she interviews a guest, and Tribune Sports, a program about sport news.

She covered the 2018 FIFA World Cup and the UEFA Euro 2020 retransferred on BeIN Sports in the programs that she presents.
