= Peter Peter (Canadian musician) =

Canadian singer-songwriter

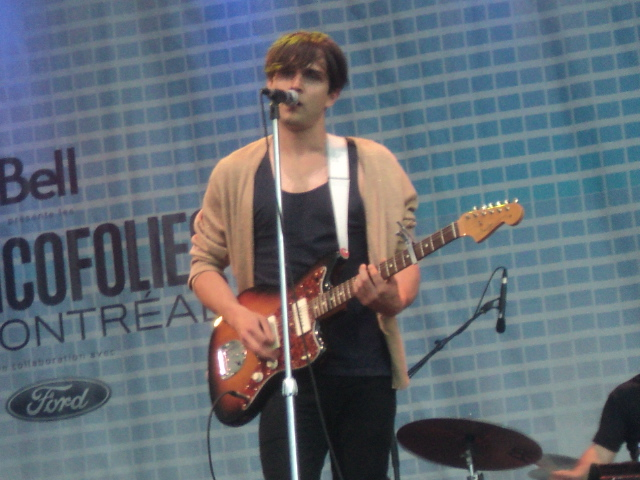
- Peter Peter performing at FrancoFolies de Montréal in June 2014

Background information
- Born: Peter Roy; 1984 (age 41–42)
- Origin: Jonquière, Canada
- Occupation: Singer-songwriter
- Years active: 2008–present
- Label: Audiogram
- Website: peterpeter.ca

Peter Roy (born c. 1984), known as Peter Peter and Peter Jones, is a Canadian singer-songwriter known for his French pop/rock compositions.

== Career ==
He started as a member of metal/alternative rock band Post-Scriptum where he played guitar and English vocals at times. After leaving the band, he moved to Montreal and resided in the Hochelaga-Maisonneuve neighborhood, concentrating on his solo career writing and performing in French. He took part as a singer-songwriter in the annual Montreal feature Ma Première Place des Arts for new artists in 2008 and won the competition.

In 2009 he signed with Audiogram record label, releasing his eponymous debut album Peter Peter on 8 March 2011 produced by Howard Bilerman. In 2011, he also took part in Les FrancoFolies de Montréal.

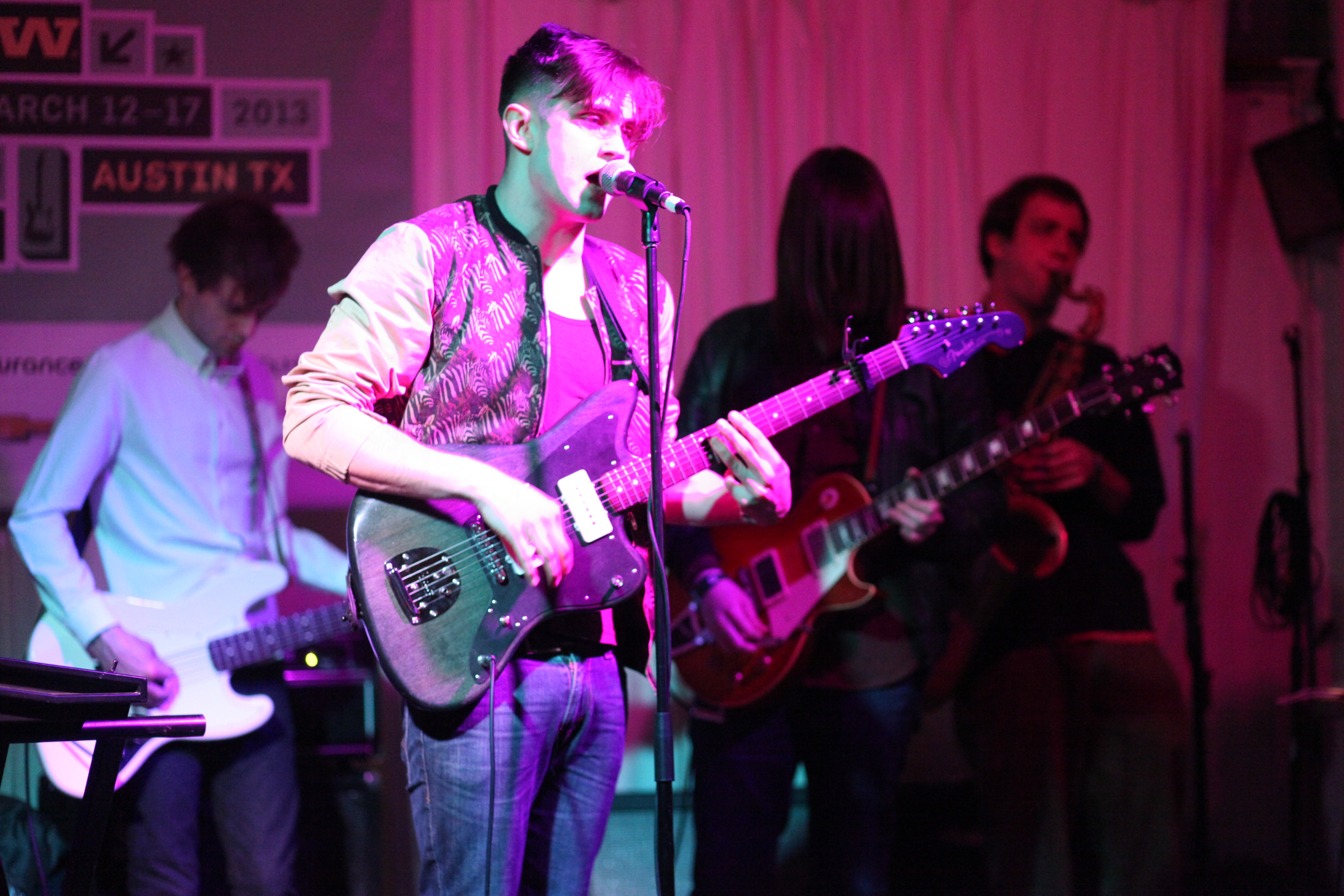
Peter Peter performing at SXSW in 2013

In June 2013, his studio album Une version améliorée de la tristesse ("An Improved Version of Sadness") was longlisted for the 2013 Polaris Music Prize.

His album Éther was a longlisted nominee for the 2024 Polaris Music Prize.

In November 2025, he composed the original music for the television series Heated Rivalry, broadcast on Crave and developed by Jacob Tierney based on the novel by Rachel Reid. This was his first original score composition for a television series. He released the tracks "Rivalry" and "It's You" as a double single on 9 January 2026. The former, which serves as the series' theme song, is an instrumental techno track that Rebecca Alter of Vulture described as "Challengers-esque". The latter accompanies the scene in the episode "Olympians" depicting Shane and Ilya's first instance of anal intercourse and was described as "slow and dreamy", with lyrics that evoke the pair's "distinctively monosyllabic texting style".

For his work on Heated Rivalry, he has been nominated for two 2026 Canadian Screen Awards: for Best Original Music (Drama); and for Best Original Music (Original Song) for "It's You"; winning in both categories.

In May 2026, he won SOCAN's Breakthrough Screen Composer Award at a gala in Montreal.

The full soundtrack album, titled Heated Rivalry (Original Series Soundtrack), was released digitally on 16 January 2026, via Milan Records; an LP release is also in the works.

== Discography ==
=== Albums ===
Title	Details	Peak chart positions									
Title	Details	CAN	AUS	AUT	BEL (WA)	FRA	GER	NLD	SWI	UK Sound.	US
Peter Peter	Released: 2011; Track listing: 1. "Homa"; 2. "Réfractaire"; 3. "Tergiverse"; 4. "Montréal neige sale" 5. "Rien ne nous rassemble" 6. "Dring dring pow pow" 7. "Laurie"; 8. "Porte-bonheur"; 9. "Demain, c'est l'heure" 10. "97"; 11. "Cesse de pleuvoir" 12. "UHF"	—	—	—	—	—	—	—	—	—	—
Une version améliorée de la tristesse	Released: 2013; Track listing: 1. "Une version améliorée de la tristesse" (3:56); 2. "Carrousel" (3:41); 3. "Tout prend son sens dans le miroir" (3:32); 4. "Réverbère" (3:45); 5. "MDMA" (3:08); 6. "Beauté baroque" (3:12); 7. "Le monde n'y peut rien" (3:51); 8. "Rien ne se perd, rien ne se crée" (3:06); 9. "Barbès-rochechouart" (2:48); 10. "Les chemins étoilés" (4:04)	—	—	—	—	177	—	—	—	—	—
Noir Éden	Released: 2017; Track listing: 1. "Bien réel" (6:39); 2. "Damien" (3:12); 3. "Fantôme de la nuit" (0:32); 4. "Nosferatu" (3:21); 5. "Loving Game" (3:03); 6. "Venus" (4:37); 7. "Noir éden" (5:21); 8. "Allégresse" (3:16); 9. "Little Shangri-La" (3:09); 10. "No Man's Land" (3:37); 11. "Orchidée" (4:00); 12. "Pâle cristal bleu" (4:40); 13. "Bien réel" (Radio edit) (3:25)	—	—	—	—	111	—	—	—	—	—
Super Comédie	Released: 2020; Track listing: 1. "Super Comédie" (4:30); 2. "Conversation" (4:54); 3. "Commun maintenant" (4:01); 4. "Extraordinaire" (4:08); 5. "Damnatio Memoriae" (2:03); 6. "C'est une saison sans le temps qui passe" (3:58); 7. "Les mariés ont disparu" (4:47); 8. "Nature obscène" (4:06); 9. "Essayer" (3:14); 10. "Résurrection" (4:51); 11. "Répétition" (4:44)	—	—	—	—	—	—	—	—	—	—
Éther	Released: 2024; Track listing: 1. "Soleil" (6:29); 2. "20k heures de solitude" (4:59); 3. "Journée comme celle-ci" (4:54); 4. "Ciel" (4:17); 5. "Fcking poésie" (3:39); 6. "On a besoin d'amour" (2:47); 7. "Se contenter d'un mirage" (3:16); 8. "Lisbonne " (4:15); 9. "Danses-tu dehors, ce soir quelque part, loin de ton téléphone?" (5:03); 10. "Éther" (5:32)	—	—	—	—	—	—	—	—	—	—
Heated Rivalry (Original Series Soundtrack)	Released: 16 January 2026; Label: Milan Records; Formats: Digital download, CD, LP	8	3	7	6	—	5	17	31	1	8
"—" denotes releases that did not chart or were not released in that region.

=== Singles ===
Title	Year	Peak positions		Album
Title	Year	FRA	NZ Hot	Album
"Tergiverse"	2011	—	—	Peter Peter
"Homa"	2011	—	—	Peter Peter
"Une version améliorée de la tristesse"	2012	—	—	Une version améliorée de la tristesse
"Carrousel"	2013	167	—	Une version améliorée de la tristesse
"Noir Eden"	2016	—	—	Noir Eden
"Conversation"	2020	—	—	Super Comédie
"Rome"	2022	—	—	Non-album single
"20k heures de solitude"	2024	—	—	Éther
"Soleil"	2024	—	—	Éther
"Rivalry"	2026	—	33	Heated Rivalry (Original Series Soundtrack)
"It's You"	2026	—	27	Heated Rivalry (Original Series Soundtrack)
"—" denotes releases that did not chart or were not released in that region.
