= Michel Pinçon =

French sociologist (1942–2022)

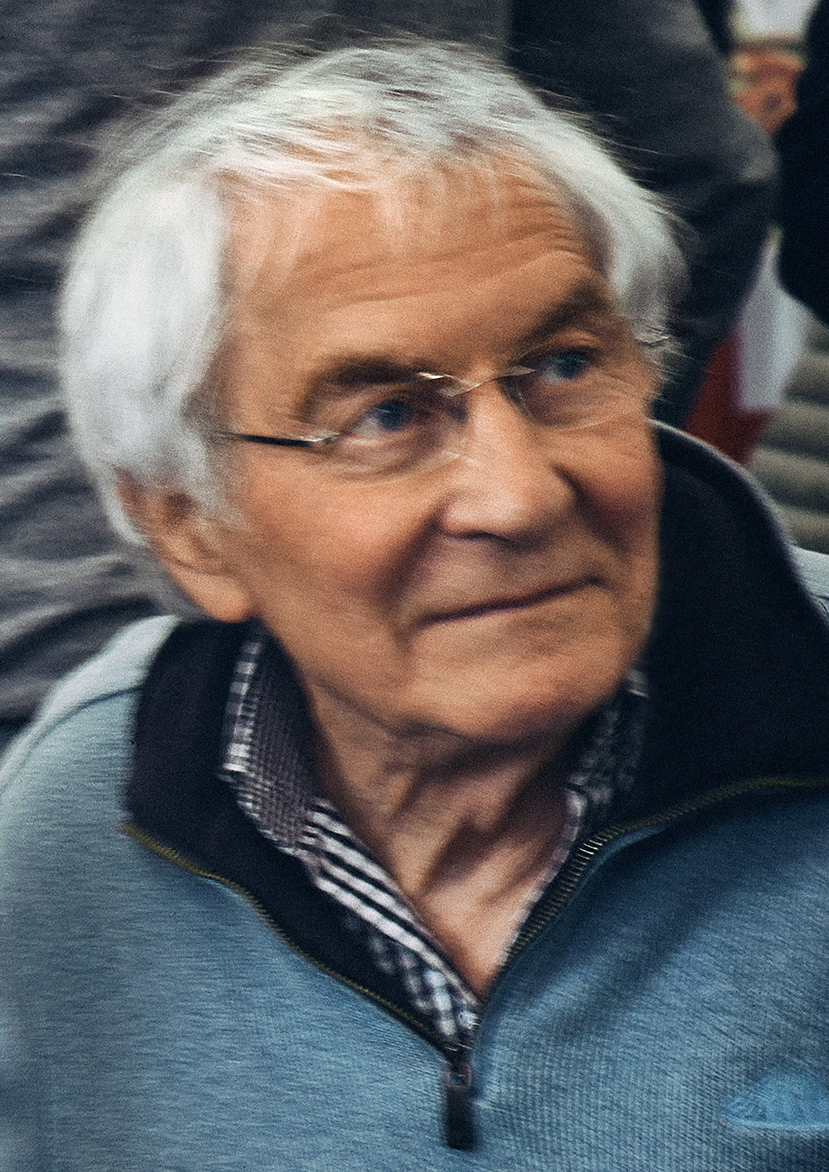
- Pinçon in 2019
- Born: 18 May 1942; Lonny, France
- Died: 26 September 2022 (aged 80); 13th arrondissement of Paris, France
- Education: University of Vincennes
- Occupation: Sociologist
- Spouse: Monique Pinçon-Charlot
- Children: 1

Michel Pinçon (18 May 1942 – 26 September 2022) was a French sociologist. He served as Director of Research at CNRS and taught at the Paris 8 University Vincennes-Saint-Denis. Most of his work was written in collaboration with his wife, Monique Pinçon-Charlot, and devoted to the study of the upper middle class and social elites.

== Biography ==
Pinçon was born in Lonny, Ardennes, on 18 May 1942 into a working-class family. His father was a polisher in Nouzonville. In 1967, he married fellow sociology student Monique Charlot, with whom he had a son. The marriage allowed his wife to accompany him while on France’s civilian service abroad (Coopération) in Morocco, which inspired his dissertation supervised by Jean-Claude Passeron. Upon the couple's return, they completed their studies at the University of Vincennes and began working for the CNRS.

Throughout his career, Pinçon was interviewed multiple times on France Inter. His works focused on income inequality and the customs and habits of wealthy families. Through his publications, he explored an anthropology of the elite class in contemporary French society.

Pinçon and his wife retired in 2007 and published more concise works thanks to an ability to express themselves more freely while not employed. In 2012, he publicly supported Jean-Luc Mélenchon for President, a candidate of the Left Front. He later distanced himself from Mélenchon, calling him "a new Mitterrand".

Michel Pinçon died of Alzheimer's disease in Paris, on 26 September 2022, at the age of 80. National Secretary of the French Communist Party Fabien Roussel paid tribute to him, saying "I pay tribute to this fellow traveler, a great sociologist, who never ceased, with Monique, to decipher the relationship of domination in all its forms".

== Works ==
- Désarrois ouvriers, familles de métallurgistes dans les mutations industrielles et sociales (1987)

=== With Monique Pinçon-Charlot ===
- Dans les beaux quartiers (1989)
- La chasse à courre, ses rites et ses enjeux (1993)
- Voyage en grande bourgeoisie (1997)
- Grandes Fortunes. Dynasties familiales et formes de richesse en France (1998)
- Sociologie de la bourgeoisie (2000)
- Sociologie de Paris (2004)
- Châteaux et Châtelains : Les siècles passent, le symbole demeure (2005)
- Les Ghettos du gotha : comment la bourgeoisie défend ses espaces (2007)
- Paris : quinze promenades sociologiques (2009)
- Les millionnaires de la chance (2010)
- Le Président des riches (2010)
- Des sociologues sans qualités ? Pratiques de recherche et engagements (2011)
- L'argent sans foi ni loi (2012)
- Altergouvernement (2012)
- La Violence des riches (2013)
- Riche, pourquoi pas toi ? (2013)
- Pourquoi les riches sont-ils de plus en plus riches et les pauvres de plus en plus pauvres ? (2014)
- C'est quoi être riche ? Entretiens avec Emile (2015)
- Tentative d'évasion (fiscale) (2015)
- Les prédateurs au pouvoir. Main basse sur notre avenir (2017)
- Panique dans le 16e ! : Une enquête sociologique et dessinée (2017)
- Les Riches au tribunal : l'affaire Cahuzac et l'évasion fiscale (2018)
- Le Président des ultra-riches : Chronique du mépris de classe dans la politique d’Emmanuel Macron (2019)
- Notre vie chez les riches : mémoires d'un couple de sociologues (2021)
