= Mezzo TV =

French classical music television channel

Mezzo
- Country: France
- Broadcast area: Worldwide
- Headquarters: Paris, France

Programming
- Picture format: 1080i HDTV (downscaled to 16:9 576i for the SDTV feed)

Ownership
- Owner: Groupe Les Échos-Le Parisien (50%); Canal+ (50%)

History
- Launched: 21 March 1998; 28 years ago 7 April 2010; 16 years ago (Live HD)
- Founder: Jacques Chancel; Marc Welinski
- Replaced: France Supervision

Links
- Website: mezzo.tv

Mezzo is a French television channel, broadcasting classical music (including opera and ballet), jazz and world music. It was formed in 1992 and was called France Supervision until 1998. In 2010 it added a sister channel, Mezzo Live HD.

In January 2008 it introduced a new filler feature, Divertimezzo, renamed Intermezzo in 2011, consisting of video clips fashioned from its programmes, with the usual wide range of music.

In the Scandinavian region the channel is distributed by Scandinavian television broadcaster NonStop Television, part of Turner Broadcasting. In Portugal it is available in basic cable, RF output in FTTH services and as a digital channel across platforms.

In 2019, Lagardère Active and France Télévisions sold Mezzo to LVMH media division Groupe Les Échos-Le Parisien and Groupe Canal+.
