= MCM Top =

French music video television channel

- Country: France
- Network: MCM

Programming
- Language: French

Ownership
- Owner: Groupe M6
- Parent: Bertelsmann
- Sister channels: RFM TV

History
- Launched: 28 November 2003; 22 years ago

MCM Top is a French music video TV channel owned by Groupe M6.

== History ==
To enrich its offer of music channels, Lagardère Active launched MCM Music+ channels on 28 November 2003. It was then composed of three channels: MCM, MCM Pop, replacing MCM 2 and MCM Top (newly created). The latter continuously broadcasts current music videos and the target population is 15 to 24 years old.

On 13 June 2007 the channel was reformatted and became interactive. New programs like "Fais Ton Top" and "Fais Ton Club" allow to vote by SMS between two clips for the next clip. Another "Top Mix" show, formerly comparable to Ultra Tubes on MCM, gives the opportunity to vote to choose the program that will be aired in the second part of the evening." Top Club, Top Rock, Top Hip Hop, Top US and Top R'N'B" become rankings made through the votes of viewers on top.mcm.net as well as the "Top.fr" which is comparable to the "hit mcm.fr".

On 1 July 2016, the channel stopped broadcasting on Canalsat, On 24 November 2016, the channel returned to Canalsat on the same channel (175) and went to HD (1920x1080p) for its 13th anniversary.

On 7 August 2018, MCM Top was removed of SFR along with Virgin Radio TV.

On 16 July 2019, MCM Top was ultimately removed of Canal+, during the merger of Lagardère Active television division with Groupe M6, along with the closure of Elle Girl TV because it wasn't renewed by Canal+ from which the latter was exclusive in France. At the same time, MCM Top was replaced by MCM on Canal+ Calédonie.

On 1 January 2020, MCM Top was removed of Orange. Also, MCM Top stopped broadcasting its programs in France, being only a simulcast of MCM through its last carriers Freebox TV and Bbox TV.

On 19 March 2022, MCM Top resumed airing its programming.

On 24 February 2024, MCM Top changed the look when the music video clips are broadcast with other Groupe M6 channels.

== Broadcast ==
As of 2024, MCM Top is available in France only through Free and Bouygues Telecom. It is available in other French-speaking territories, including Belgium, Switzerland, Monaco and Africa. MCM Top is also available in Portugal through the base offers of MEO, NOS and Vodafone. It started being distributed in Brazil in 2020 with the new satellite TV provider BluTV which went bankrupt by 2022, and is now available through other OTT services.
