= Satine Wallé =

French singer-songwriter and internet personality (born 2004)

- Satine Wallé in 2026

Background information
- Born: 17 September 2004 (age 22); Billancourt, France
- Origin: Sézanne, France
- Genres: Pop; dubstep; electronic
- Occupations: Singer-songwriter; internet personality; author
- Instrument: Voice
- Years active: 2015–present
- Label: Warner

Satine Wallé (born 17 September 2004) is a French singer-songwriter and internet personality. She first received attention as a child participant on televised talent competitions and through a YouTube channel where she discussed school bullying. Wallé reached a wider audience in late 2025 after her single "C'est toi" appeared in the soundtrack of the drama series Heated Rivalry.

== Early life and education ==
Wallé was born on 17 September 2004. She is originally from the Dordogne region of France, later moving with her family to Sézanne. Her parents are musicians, and she began performing on stage at age five, covering songs such as "Hijo de la Luna".

In 2015, Wallé was selected for the second season of the television singing competition The Voice Kids. She joined Patrick Fiori's team but left the competition after the battle rounds. After her selection for the show and the completion of her fifth-grade year (CM2), Wallé experienced school bullying. She described herself as a "scapegoat" during this time. Following this harassment, she left traditional schooling to continue her education through the National Centre for Distance Education.

== Career ==
After The Voice Kids, Wallé appeared on the show La France a un incroyable talent. She then started a YouTube channel, which acquired nearly 25,000 subscribers in six months. Media commentary in 2019 noted her content was age-appropriate, contrasting it with the "hypersexualization" of other child stars on social media.

Wallé performed as a support act for established artists in the late 2010s. In 2018, she opened for the French hip-hop duo Bigflo & Oli in Châlons-en-Champagne. She was the opening act for the Congolese rapper Gims in 2019. During this period, she advocated against school bullying and published two autobiographical novels. The first was titled Satine et Compagnie, tout pour la musique, and the second volume was released in November 2020. At age 16, she moved to Paris to pursue her career.

In 2024, Wallé released the song "C'est toi" through Warner Music. She wrote the track at age 18 about her first romantic relationship. By June 2025, she had released an EP titled Trampoline, which included tracks such as "Le monde est à nous" and "L'amour de ma vie".

In late 2025 when "C'est toi" was used in the soundtrack for the television adaptation of Heated Rivalry. The show's creator, Jacob Tierney, chose the track for a scene involving the character Shane Hollander, calling the song a "cheeky, cute, poppy earworm". Wallé had signed a contract with a Canadian production company a year prior but did not know the song would be used until the series was released. After the show premiered, her daily streaming figures rose from 95,000 to nearly 500,000 within a month, with New York becoming her top listening location.

By January 2026, Wallé's music incorporated pop, dubstep, and electronic elements. She began performing headlining concerts, including a sold-out show at La Maroquinerie in Paris. In January 2026, she announced the single, "Anomalisa", which was released in June 2026.
