= Virgin 17 =

French former television channel

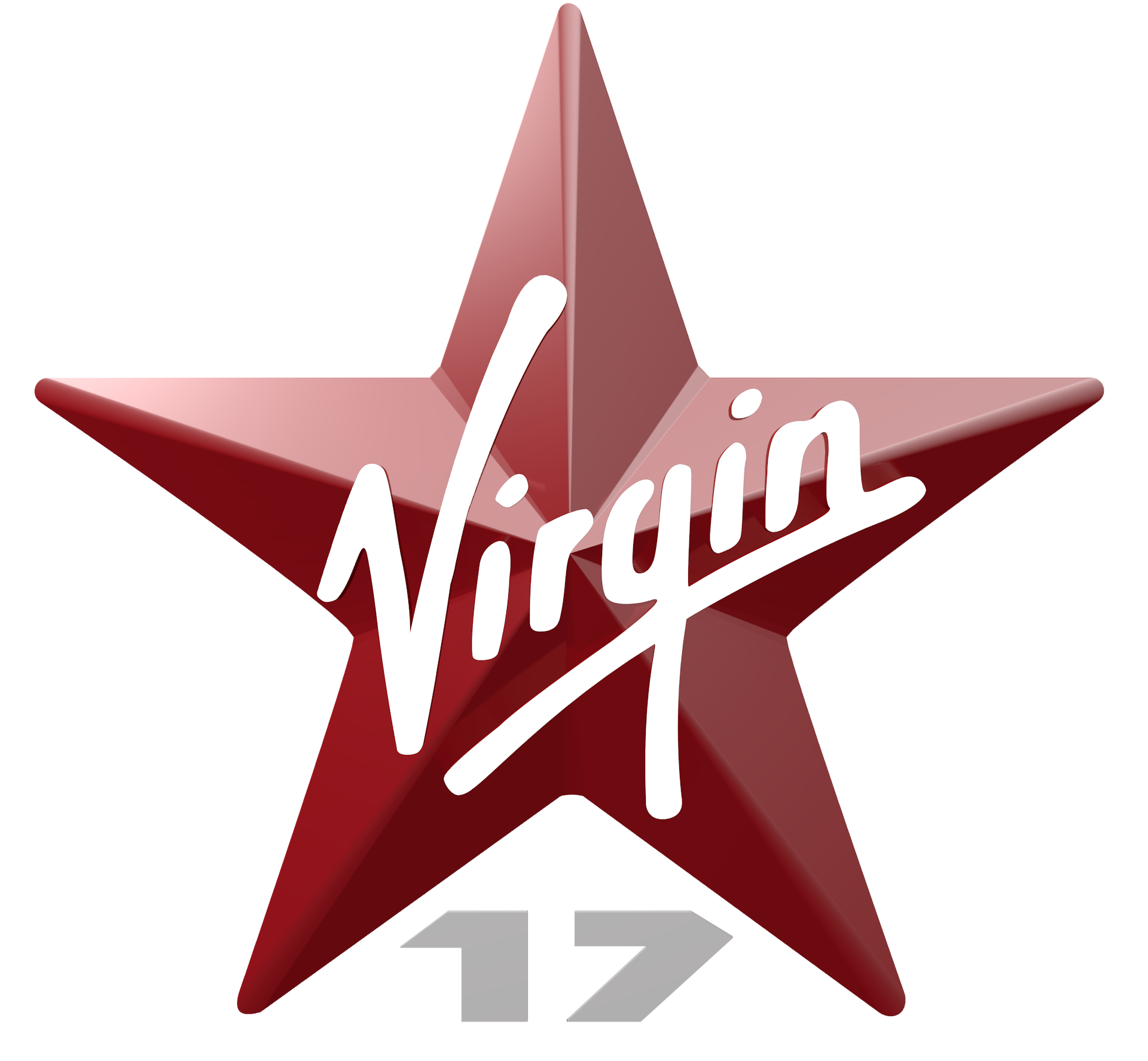
- Country: France

Ownership
- Owner: Lagardère Active (sold to Bolloré in 2010)

History
- Launched: 17 October 2005; 20 years ago
- Closed: 31 August 2010; 15 years ago
- Replaced by: Direct Star
- Former names: iMCM (project in 2002); Europe 2 TV (2005–2007)

Availability

Terrestrial
- Digital terrestrial television: Channel 17

Virgin 17 was a French music video and TV show television network owned by the MCM Group, a subsidiary of Lagardère Active. It was available through digital terrestrial television (DTT).

The channel was created for the launch of DTT and modeled after MCM, another channel owned by Lagardère Active. It initially had the working title "iMCM", but in 2004 it was named after the radio station Europe 2, and was then renamed Virgin 17 on 1 January 2008 (along with the radio station which became Virgin Radio France). From 1 September 2010, Virgin 17 was replaced by Direct Star. This change was intended by the Bolloré Group "for the sake of the uniform group" .

The TV channel had been broadcast free-to-air via satellite Hot Bird 8 (13°E) up to 2007-11-21. Now it's Viaccess encrypted and available to TPS subscribers as well as on Internet television.

Virgin 17 was replaced on 1 September 2010 by Direct Star.

== History ==
Created by MCM Group, a subsidiary of Lagardère Active for TNT on the model of its music channel MCM cable and Canalsat. It is initially presented under the name of MCM during the summer of 2002 because of the hearing of the MCM Group before the Superior council of audio-visual to obtain a frequency on TNT. The project was then renamed to be presented under the name Europe 2 TV during the second hearing before the CSA on 14 December 2004. This choice aims to capitalize on the fame of the eponymous music radio Europe 2, better known to the general public than MCM. Although bearing the same name, its musical editorial line is totally different from its radio format. 19 years after the TV6 experience, the CSA chose a free musical channel and retained the Europe 2 TV project on 19 July 2005 for broadcasting on TNT.

The channel began broadcasting on TNT channel 17 on 17 October 2005 at 5:17 pm. It targets an audience aged 15 to 34. Its specifications require it to devote 75% of its antenna to musical programs (clips, concerts, variety shows) with a few documentaries. Reality TV does not take long to make its appearance with Next. Regular meetings are scheduled with themed evenings: "Live" on Mondays, "Kidding" on Tuesdays, "Sexy" on Wednesdays, "Girls" on Thursdays, "SF" on Fridays, "Animated" on Saturdays and "Hit " Sundays. New and older series are also on the air.

Ranked last of the TNT channels in terms of audience and wishing to reach a wider audience to compete with NRJ 12, Lagardère Active decided in the summer of 2007 to rename its brands Europe 2 in radio and television by the emblematic brand of the publisher British musical Virgin with whom he is already associated in the Virgin Megastore stores in France. On 17 July 2007, the CSA gave its agreement to change the name of Europe 2 TV to Virgin 17, but the authorization is subject to several conditions: the chain's logo must not be confused with those of products or services which include in their name the Virgin brand and the ban on advertising for the Virgin group and any references to Virgin products on the air. However, the CSA authorizes the use of the Virgin international logo.. Europe 2 TV changed its name on 1 January 2008 at midnight by ending its programs with the title Happy Ending by Mika, followed by a video message from Richard Branson, the boss of the Virgin Group, celebrating the birth of Virgin 17. Virgin 17 is broadcast in Belgium from 4 January 2010, to replace MCM Belgique which disappeared on 31 December 2009, on VOO and Numericable.

On 18 March 2010, Bolloré group, already owner of Direct 8, announced that it had entered into exclusive negotiations with Lagardère Active for the purchase of Virgin 17. On 10 June 2010, the two groups signed a final agreement to sell the channel at a price of €70 million, excluding the takeover of staff (20 people) and part of the programs. 12 July 2010, the CSA gives its agreement for this repurchase. Yannick Bolloré, future general manager of the channel, indicates that it will be called Direct Star and announces its intention to keep the musical format of the channel and even to "strengthen the place of music in the first and second part of the evening" in a "more urban and contemporary" universe. Bolloré group appoints Christophe Sabot (former manager at NRJ and Virgin 17) as director of the channel and the Direct Star website goes live on 16 August 2010.

Virgin 17 stopped broadcasting on 30 August 2010 at around 11:59pm with highlights from the channel.
