= Les Troubadours du désordre =

French rock group

- Origin: France
- Genres: Rock music in France, country, folk
- Years active: Since 1998
- Members: Mlle Chomb; Dom Kiris; Marie Tuvache; Paul Mercier; Romain Fradet

Les Troubadours du désordre is a French rock group, originating from Paris. It consists of singer Mlle Chomb and songwriter Dom Kiris. The group also includes Marie Tuvache on vocals and backing vocals, Paul Mercier on bass, and Romain Fradet on drums.

== Biography ==
Mlle Chomb and Dom Kiris have been a duo since 1998, when they released a song for free download on the Internet. This song, titled La Nique au Joyeux Noël, was composed by the duo along with Louis Bertignac from the band Téléphone. In exchange for the song, internet users were invited to make a donation to Secours populaire français, an initiative praised by the press (including Le Monde, Libération, Guitariste Magazine, etc.).

The duo then performed in small Parisian concert venues before releasing their first self-produced album in 1999, titled Mlle Chomb et Dom Kiris. In 2001, during the recording of their album Charivari, the group was discovered by the independent label Label M10 (Musidisc). The album was released on March 7 of the same year. They subsequently embarked on a promotional tour through Fnac stores as they were part of Fnac's best self-produced albums, according to their own statements. The song Même si personne from this album was selected by Warner Music and Rock & Folk, among the best self-produced groups, to be included in the compilation Destination France Rock sponsored by Noir Désir, M, Matmatah, and Les Négresses Vertes. In the same year, as a sign of recognition, the group was invited to participate in the music festival Les Effervessonnes with Jacques Higelin, Brigitte Fontaine, Tryo, and Sergent Garcia.

The group gradually gained some success and had the opportunity to play in large Parisian venues such as the L'Élysée-Montmartre, Le Divan du Monde, and La Cigale, invited by groups like Blankass, Charlélie Couture, les Têtes raides, and Astonvilla. An American radio station recently invited them to play at the South by Southwest festival in Austin, Texas, US, a major gathering place for country and folk music.

In 2006 the track La Mobylette rouge from the album T was selected to be included in two compilations: La Nouvelle Guinche Vol. 2, featuring new talents of French music such as Sanseverino, Mano Solo, and Les Hurlements d'Léo; and the compilation Ketchup and Marmalade Vol. 1, initiated by Mélanie Bauer with Dionysos, Kaolin, Julien Ribot, and J. P. Nataf. Since then, the group has sporadically appeared in the 2010s, notably performing at concerts during the 6e nuit des Chiens Bleus.

== Musical style ==
The band defines themselves as musicians trying to capture the spirit of folk music from great popular songs by playing authentic music influenced by Celtic, Blues, Gypsy, and country styles. Mlle Chomb and Dom Kiris define themselves as a "Parisian acoustic country folk duo."

== Discography ==
=== Studio albums ===
- 1999: Mlle Chomb et Dom Kiris (6 tracks)
- 2002: Live Charivari (10 tracks)
- 2005: T (6 tracks)

=== Collaborations ===
- 2001: Destination France Rock (compilation)
- 2005: Rock'n'Roll All Stars (compilation)
- 2006: La Nouvelle Guinche Vol. 2 and Ketchup and Marmalade Vol. 1.

=== Singles ===
- 1998: La Nique au Joyeux Noël (single freely available on the Internet)
