= Les Sales Majestés =

French punk rock band

Les Sales Majestés (French pronunciation: [le sal maʒɛste]) are a French punk rock band. Les Sales Majestés sing about political and social issues dominant in France. The band has songs about the church, the French elite, the unemployed, the Front National, and the politicians in power.

== History and line-up ==
Les Sales Majestés's members first met in the late 80s and released several early EPs and singles, though their first full album, Bienvenue, was not recorded until 1995. The band line-up was as follows: Arnaud (vocals), Mathias, replaced by Guillaume in 1998 (drums), Yves (lead guitar), Vlad (bass guitar) and Yann (rhythm guitar). The band released two more full albums and an EP by 2000.

== Discography ==
- Bienvenue (1995)
- No Problemo (1997)
- Dernier Combat (1998)
- Y'a pas d'amour (2000)
- Bordel In Live (2001)
- Best-of 1992-2002 (2002)
- Week-end sauvage (CD/DVD live) (2008)
- Sois pauvre et tais-toi ! (2010)
- Sexe, Fric & Politique (2013)
- Ni Dieu ni Maître (2015)
- Droit dans le mur (2017)
- Overdose (2019)
- Le Feu (2023)
