= CStar =

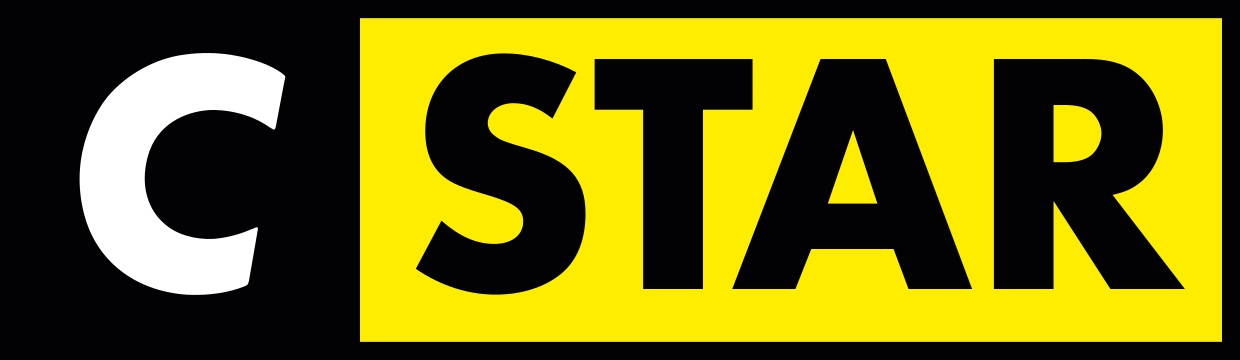
- Country: France
- Broadcast area: France

Programming
- Language: French
- Picture format: 1080i (HDTV); 576i (SDTV)

Ownership
- Owner: Canal+
- Sister channels: Canal+ CNews

History
- Launched: 7 October 2012; 13 years ago
- Replaced: Direct Star
- Former names: D17 (2012-2016)

Links
- Website: canalplus.com/chaines/cstar

Availability

Terrestrial
- TNT: Channel 17
- TNT in Overseas France: Channel 17 or 18 or 19

Streaming media
- MyCanal: Live

CStar (pronounced [se staʁ]) is a French free-to-air television channel, owned by Canal+.

== History ==
D17 was launched on 7 October 2012, replacing Direct Star, after Canal+ bought it from Bolloré.

D17 was rebranded CStar on 5 September 2016.

Since 27 February 2018, a sister channel named CStar Hits France is available exclusively on Canal+ channel 180, airing only French music clips.

== Programs ==
CStar's programming has a musical predominant. The channel also airs documentaries, concerts, series, dramas, movies and previously Japanese anime.

== See also ==
- Groupe Canal+
- Direct Star
- C8
