= Monique Pinçon-Charlot =

French sociologist (born 1946)

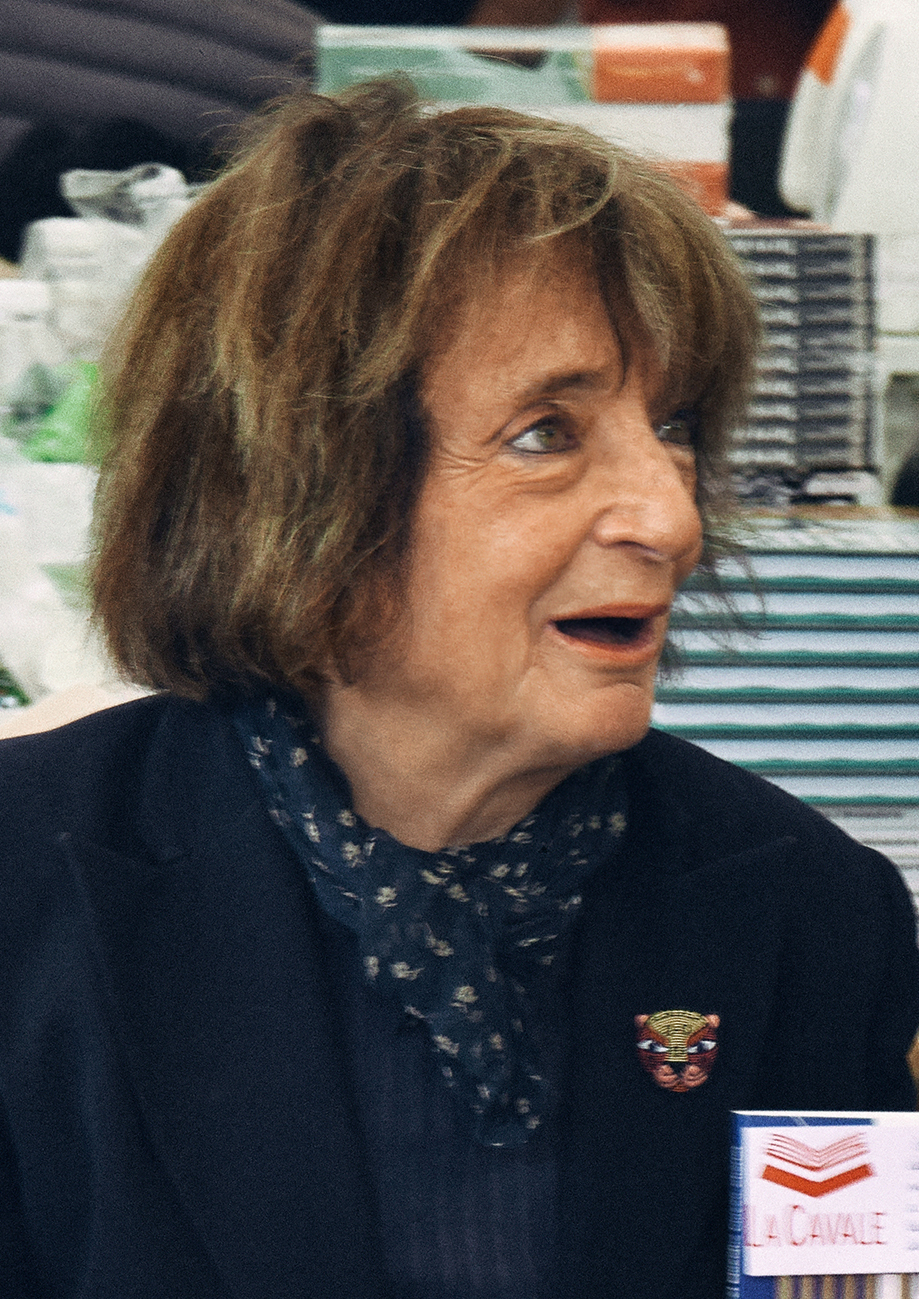
- Pinçon-Charlot in 2019
- Born: Monique Charlot; 15 May 1946 (age 80); Saint-Étienne, France
- Occupation: Sociologist
- Spouse: Michel Pinçon
- Children: 1

Monique Pinçon-Charlot (French: [mɔnik pɛ̃sɔ̃ ʃaʁlo]; born 15 May 1946, in Saint-Étienne, France) is a French sociologist, research director at the French National Centre for Scientific Research (CNRS) until 2007, year of her retiring, attached to the Research Institute on Contemporary Societies/ l'Institut de recherche sur les sociétés contemporaines (IRESCO).

She works generally in collaboration with her husband Michel Pinçon, also a sociologist; they coauthored the majority of their works. These treat the closing within the upper classes of the society, through themes such as the homogamy or the social norms.

== Works ==
=== Co-authored with different colleagues ===
- Introduction à l'étude de la planification urbaine en région parisienne—Introduction to the Study of Urban Planning in the Region of Paris-- (with Edmond Preteceille), Paris : Centre de sociologie urbaine, 1973.
- Les Conditions d'exploitation de la force de travail—Conditions for Workforce Exploitation-- (with Michel Freyssenet et François Imbert), Paris : Centre de sociologie urbaine, 1975.
- Les Modalités de reproduction de la force de travail—Reproduction Modes of the workforce-- (with Michel Freyssenet et François Imbert), Paris : Centre de sociologie urbaine, 1975.
- Équipements collectifs, structures urbaines et consommation sociale—Shared Equipment, Urban Structures and Social Consumption-- (with Edmond Preteceille et Paul Rendu), Paris : Centre de sociologie urbaine, 1975.
- Espace social et espace culturel. Analyse de la distribution socio-spatiale des équipements culturels et éducatifs en région parisienne—Social space and Cultural Space: Analysis of the Socio-spatial Distribution of Educational and Cultural Equipment in the Paris Region (with Paul de Gaudemar), Paris : Centre de sociologie urbaine, 1979.
- Espace des équipements collectifs et ségrégation sociale—Shared Equipment and Social Segregation-- (with Paul Rendu), Paris : Centre de sociologie urbaine, 1981.
- Ségrégation urbaine (with Paul Rendu et Edmond Preteceille), Paris : Anthropos, 1986.
- Des sociologues sans qualités ? Pratiques de recherche et engagements, --Sociologists Without Qualities? ReseaRch and Engagement Practices—edited by Delphine Naudier et Maud Simonet, Paris, La Découverte, 2011.
- Altergouvernement (ouvrage collectif), Le Muscadier, 2012.(ISBN 979-1090685000).

=== With Michel Pinçon ===
- Dans les beaux quartiers, --In Good Neighborhoods—Paris Seuil, coll. « L'Épreuve des faits », 1989.
- Quartiers bourgeois, quartiers d'affaires, --Bourgeois Neighborhoods, Business Neighborhoods—Paris : Payot, coll. « Documents Payot », 1992.
- La Chasse à courre. Ses rites et ses enjeux, Paris : Payot, coll. « Documents Payot », 1993.
  - Réédition coll. « Petite bibliothèque Payot », 2003.
- Grandes Fortunes. Dynasties familiales et formes de richesse en France, Paris : Payot, coll. « Documents Payot », 1996.
  - Réédition augmentée coll. « Petite bibliothèque Payot », 2006.
  - Réédition coll. « Petite bibliothèque Payot », 1998.
- Voyage en grande bourgeoisie, Paris : Presses universitaires de France, coll. « Sciences sociales et sociétés », 1997.
  - Réédition coll. « Quadrige » n°380, 2002. Réédition actualisée 2005.
- Les Rothschild. Une famille bien ordonnée, Paris : La Dispute, 1998.
- Nouveaux patrons, nouvelles dynasties, Paris : Calmann-Lévy, 1999.
- Sociologie de la bourgeoisie, Paris : La Découverte, coll. « Repères » n°294, 2000. Rééditions actualisées 2003 et 2007.
- Paris mosaïque. Promenades urbaines, Paris : Calmann-Lévy, 2001.
  - Paris. Quinze promenades sociologiques, Paris : Payot, 2009. Réédition fortement remaniée.
  - Réédition coll. « Petite bibliothèque Payot » n°926, 2013.
- Le Cas Pinochet. Justice et politique, Paris : Syllepse, coll. « Arguments-Mouvements », 2003.
- Sociologie de Paris, Paris : La Découverte, coll. « Repères » n°400, 2004. Réédition actualisée 2008.
- Châteaux et châtelains. Les siècles passent, le symbole demeure, Paris : Anne Carrière, 2005.
- Les Ghettos du gotha. Comment la bourgeoisie défend ses espaces, Paris : Seuil, 2007. (ISBN 978-2-7578-1745-2)
  - Réédition Paris : Points, 2010.
- Les Millionnaires de la chance. Rêve et réalité, Paris : Payot, 2010.
  - Réédition coll. « Petite bibliothèque Payot » n°836, 2011.
- Le Président des riches. Enquête sur l'oligarchie dans la France de Nicolas Sarkozy, Paris : La Découverte, 2010. (ISBN 978-2-35522-018-0)
  - Réédition augmentée coll. « La Découverte Poche. Essais » n°353, 2011.
- L'Argent sans foi ni loi, Paris : Éditions Textuel, 2012. (ISBN 978-2845974449)
- La violence des riches - Chronique d'une immense casse sociale, Zones, 2013.
- Riche, pourquoi pas toi ?, mis en bande dessinée par Marion Montaigne, Paris : Dargaud, 2013.
- Pourquoi les riches sont-ils de plus en plus riches et les pauvres de plus en plus pauvres ?, illustré par Etienne Lécroart, Paris, La Ville Brûle, 2014.
- C'est quoi être riche ? Entretiens avec Emile, illustré par Pascal Lemaître, Paris, Edition de l'Aube, 2015.
- Tentative d'évasion (fiscale), Zones, 2015.
- Le Président des ultra-riches. Chronique du mépris de classe dans la politique d'Emmanuel Macron, Paris, Zones, 2019.
- Notre vie chez les riches. Mémoires d'un couple de sociologues, Paris, Zones, 2021.

== See also ==
- Bourgeoisie
