= MCM (TV channel) =

French music television channel

- Country: Monaco; France

Ownership
- Owner: Groupe M6
- Sister channels: RFM TV; MCM Top

History
- Launched: 1 July 1989; 37 years ago
- Closed: 1 July 2026; 2 months ago

Links
- Website: Official website

MCM (originally an acronym for Monte-Carlo Musique, later Ma Chaîne Musicale) was a French music video and entertainment TV channel owned by Groupe M6. It was started in 1989 by Europe 1 Communication following the MTV model, as a programming block of the Monegasque TV station TMC. Gradually, MCM noticed its desire to become a full-fledged cable channel, leaving MCM and starting standalone broadcasts in 1991. Over time, MCM launched international feeds (MCM Belgique, MCM Africa) and spin-off channels (MCM2, later MCM Pop, and MCM Top).

The main MCM channel gradually experienced a phase of channel drift by reducing the amount of music-related programmes and music videos, by adding TV series, movies and anime. The channel was acquired by M6 in 2019 and at closing time mainly broadcast repeats of programmes seen on other channels owned by the group. The channel was closed on 1 July 2026 at 0:00 CET.

From 2001–2003, MCM also broadcast in Thailand, operated by local licensee Broadcast Network Thailand (aka: UBC), which played a mix of alternative and electronica music, and hosted by a variety of bilingual VJs speaking Thai and English, including Sara Malakul, Kipsan Beck and Fah Chanika Sucharitkul.

== History ==
In the 1980s, the French audiovisual landscape changed, with the arrival of channels such as Canal+ in 1984 and La Cinq and TV6 in 1986, followed by the privatization of TF1 in 1987. The two peripheral private channels along the border, Télé Monte-Carlo (TMC) in the south-east and RTL Télévision in the north-east were no longer alone in the face of the French public service monopoly, and had to share the advertising cake with the newcomers.

By 1987, TMC was in trouble, with programs and investors in short supply since the failed sale of TMC and RMC by Sofirad in 1987. The new M6 channel, whose transmitters in the south of France are not yet fully deployed, is interested in TMC's transmitter network to increase its broadcast coverage in this area. M6 wanted to make TMC a station affiliated to its national network, able to offer a local program to complement the national broadcast.

Thirteen months later, on 1 July 1989, with M6 having been able to deploy its own transmitters in the south of France, the broadcast partnership with TMC came to an end.

On 1 July 1989, Télé Monte-Carlo, whose own resources were then limited to evening broadcasts, launched the new program “Monte-Carlo Musique” (or MCM Euromusique), a music schedule created by Europe 1 Communication and Télé Monte-Carlo. MCM was broadcast all day long, except in the evening, when TMC broadcast its own programs. This on-air reformatting allowed TMC to increase its broadcasting via French, Belgian and Swiss cable networks, as the only French music channel (after the closure of TV6), complemented by D2-MAC satellite broadcasting on TDF-1/TDF-2.

During this period, Télé Monte-Carlo (TMC) played an important role in the production of musical content. The channel welcomed many musicians to its TV sets. TMC made its facilities available for the creation of filmed musical performances or video clips. These sequences, mainly produced in playback, provided artists with a low-cost platform for promoting their music. These programs are often among their first television appearances.

TMC was inspired by its program Des Clips et des Claps, presented by Valérie Payet which was a big hit with audiences in the southeast, to create and broadcast Monte-Carlo Musique (MCM), a music program modelled as a French-style MTV called “Euromusique”, co-created by Europe 1 Communication (via its subsidiary Euromusique) and Télé Monte-Carlo. Valérie Payet was the first presenter on the channel.

The video sequences initially produced for TMC were an important part of MCM's early clip programming. This synergy enriched the catalog of clips available for broadcast, at a time when the production of dedicated music videos was not yet systematic in the French music industry. From June 1990, the MCM program was also broadcast in the Lyon and Toulouse conurbations by the transmitters of the local channels TLM (Lyon) and TLT (Toulouse), with off-air broadcasts on the same principle as TMC.

From 1989 until 2026, under the provisional name “Euromusique”, MCM's music program had been broadcast by satellite in the new D2 Mac broadcasting standard, on the TDF 1 and 2 satellites. These satellite broadcasts could be received free-to-air, but required a receiver compatible with this new standard, or Canal+'s Decsat decoder and a compact satellite dish, or a Visiopass terminal for cable subscribers. However, these satellites suffered from serious breakdowns, and MCM was forced to find alternatives to its English-language competitor MTV.

In 1992, Lagardère SCA (through Europe 1 Communication and its subsidiary Euromusique) decided to turn the music program MCM, which until then had been broadcast by satellite and repeated on the TMC channel (and TLM), into a fully-fledged music theme channel, to be broadcast on the new Canalsatellite bouquet, of which Lagardère SCA was a shareholder. Broadcasting of MCM on TMC and TLM was discontinued at the end of Summer 1992. The acronym MCM then stands for Ma Chaîne Musicale.

MCM Euromusique had financial difficulties in its early years. The French music channel posted losses of 23 million francs in 1992, followed by 19.4 million francs in 1993.

MCM Africa was created in 1994, then divested in 2002 to Alliance Trace Media and became Trace TV (now Trace Urban) in 2003.

In January 2000, the Lagardère and Canal+ groups signed a “long-term alliance” in digital television, with Groupe Canal+ acquiring a 49% stake in Lagardère's channels, including MCM.

In 2001, MCM 2 was created, broadcasting clips from the 80s and 90s, and targeting the generation that had seen the beginnings of MCM. In 2002, a Belgian version of MCM was launched, which was shut down on 31 December 2009.

On 28 November 2003, MCM 2 became MCM Pop and MCM Top was launched targeting younger audiences from 15–24, as MCM wasn't anymore a 24h music channel, with international shows and anime.

In January 2005, Lagardère Active and Groupe Canal+ signed an agreement to unwind their cross-shareholdings in MultiThématiques to the Canal+ Group, and in Lagardère Thématiques, which will then be almost entirely owned by the Lagardère group (with Partcom). The separation was made following the Conseil d'État's decision of 20 October 2004, which cancelled the DTT authorizations of 6 channels on the grounds of their joint control in Lagardère Thématiques. The two groups thus intended to present themselves under optimum conditions for the next call for entries by the CSA for the allocation of DTT frequencies. The MCM group had already presented the iMCM project in 2002 which had been selected, and renamed it Europe 2 TV in its second hearing on 14 December 2004, whose project was accepted again and launched in 2005.

The channel launched a temporary pizza line with Speed Rabbit Pizza, MCM Pizza, in March 2012.

In 2013, the High Council of Audiovisual (CSA) published the authorization of the new positioning of the initial programming of the MCM channel, towards a more male audience between 15 and 34 years.

In 2015, MCM started airing American adult animated shows from Fox, starting with Family Guy and Futurama. Previously, the 5 first seasons of Robot Chicken aired on MCM from 2006 to 2013. In 2017, MCM stopped airing anime by removing One Piece at the end of the year (which new dubbed episodes started to rather premiere on Game One), and premiered in France Bob's Burgers in November. In September 2018, American Dad was added. MCM also aired seasons of Family Guy and Bob’s Burgers in simulcast with the US, in the original audio with subtitles.

In 2019, Lagardère Active sold its channels including MCM to Groupe M6. With the acquisition, its female-focused sister channel Elle Girl TV was shut down and some of its programming was moved to MCM at the time.

In 2019, MCM started airing reruns of Pokémon, along with One Piece the following year. In 2023, all adult animated shows were removed of MCM (and other Groupe M6 channels 6ter and Série Club where The Simpsons also aired at the same time). Since then, MCM only air Pokémon in its regular day-time schedule and as animated programming, in addition to musical programming La Zone oriented towards urban music. The channel also started airing reruns of shows seen on other Groupe M6 channels (This Is Us, MacGyver), replaced by Les Reines du shopping from 2025, and made-for-TV movies, on evenings and weekend afternoons.

On 17 April 2026, French web publication Screen+ confirmed, upon receiving an announcement from Groupe M6, that the channel would close on 30 June. The final night consisted of two pre-packaged nostalgia documentaries (one on cartoons and one on geek culture). This was followed by a small block of music videos near midnight, the last of which being Juliette Armanet's Le dernier jour du disco, followed by an AI animated loop depicting the evolution of a teenager's room through the decades, ending with the message "The channel has ceased broadcasting. See you on M6+ to watch all programmes from the M6 group".

== Logos ==
Since 1989, there were seven different logos for this channel. The first logo of the channel was used from 1989 to 1991, the second logo was used from 1991 to 1998, the third from 1998 to 2001, the fourth from 2001 to 2005, the fifth from 2005 to 2007, the sixth from 2007 to 2017, and the seventh and last logo from 2017 until its closure in 2026.

From 1990 to 1995, the digital on-screen graphic was located on the upper left corner of the screen. From 1995 until its closure in 2026, it was moved to the upper right corner of the screen and dropped from upper left corner.
