= Lonny, Ardennes =

Lonny
- Commune
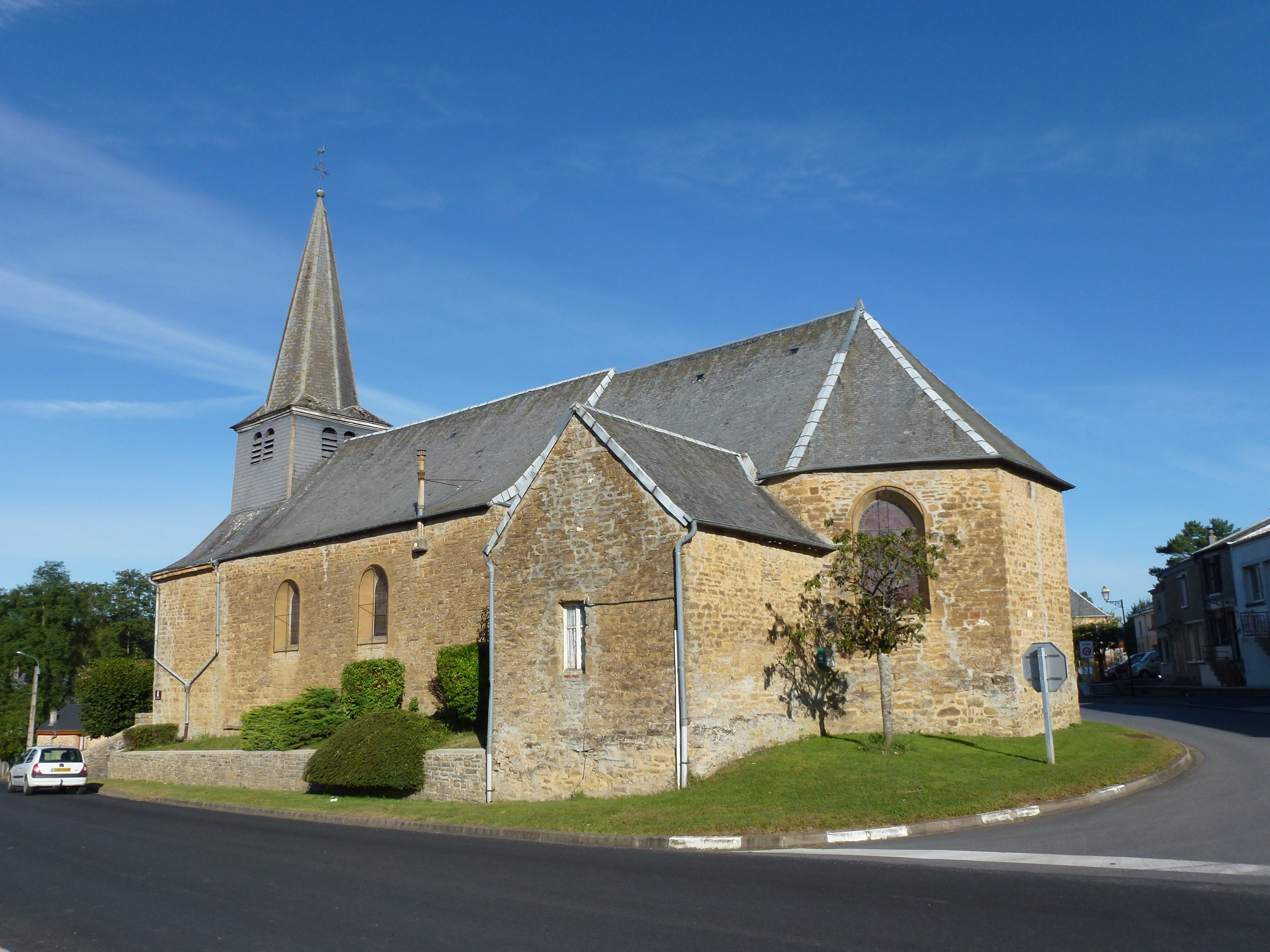
- The church in Lonny

- Coat of arms
- Location of Lonny
- Location within France Location within Grand Est
- Coordinates: 49°48′59″N 4°35′18″E
- Country: France
- Region: Grand Est
- Department: Ardennes
- Arrondissement: Charleville-Mézières
- Canton: Rocroi
- Intercommunality: Vallées et Plateau d'Ardenne

Government
  - Mayor (2020–2026): Mickaël Leclère
- Area^{1}: 4.69 km^{2} (1.81 sq mi)
- Elevation: 342 m (1,122 ft)
- Population (2023): 621
  - Density: 132/km^{2} (343/sq mi)
- Time zone: UTC+01:00 (CET)
  - Summer (DST): UTC+02:00 (CEST)
- INSEE/Postal code: 08260 /08150
- ^{1} French Land Register data, which excludes lakes, ponds, glaciers > 1 km^{2} (0.386 sq mi or 247 acres) and river estuaries.

Lonny (French pronunciation: [lɔni]) is a commune in the Ardennes department in northern France.

== Population ==
Historical population
Year	Pop.	±% p.a.
1968	419	—
1975	394	−0.88%
1982	389	−0.18%
1990	371	−0.59%
1999	414	+1.23%
2007	441	+0.79%
2012	623	+7.15%
2017	648	+0.79%
2023	621	−0.71%
Source: INSEE

== See also ==
- Communes of the Ardennes department
