= RFM (French radio station) =

- France
- Broadcast area: France (National Network); Monaco
- Frequencies: 103.9 MHz (Paris); 107.3 MHz (Lyon); 89.2 MHz (Marseille); 103.0 MHz (Monaco); Full list of frequencies in other areas

Programming
- Language: French
- Format: Oldies, AC

Ownership
- Owner: Lagardère News
- Sister stations: Europe 1 Europe 2

History
- First air date: 6 June 1981; 44 years ago

Links
- Website: www.rfm.fr

RFM is a French radio station owned by Lagardère News, based in Paris and created in 1981.

== History ==
The radio station RFM was created by Patrick Meyer and started broadcasting on 6 June 1981, then offering a musical program including mainly: Rock, World music and French music in stereo audio. Its first slogan was RFM, la radio couleur (RFM, the color radio), with a logo representing the 3 letters R F M in the form of green, yellow and pink. It was created by the DMM France agency led by Jean-François Minne.

In March 1989, RFM's founder Patrick Meyer decided to hand over the station to the English group Crown Communication, Andrew Manderstam then became the CEO and recruited Frédéric Schlesinger to ensure national development of the network.

In September 1994, RFM started a new format: The best French and International Oldies from the 1960s to the 1990s. A new logo and slogan ("RFM, La radio en or") was created.

In September 1999, RFM TV was launched on cable and satellite. The chain, which declined the radio programming, was carried out under license by the AB Groupe, which later stopped broadcasting since March 2005 because Lagardère declined to renew its license agreement with AB.

In December 1999, the website www.rfm.fr was launched. The site also provided a live stream to listen to the radio station on the Internet, using Real Audio.

In June 2011, RFM celebrated its 30 years.
