= Direct Star =

French former music television channel

- Country: France
- Headquarters: Puteaux, France

Programming
- Language: French
- Picture format: 576i (SDTV)

Ownership
- Owner: Canal+ Group (60%); Bolloré Group (40%)

History
- Launched: 1 September 2010; 16 years ago
- Replaced: Virgin 17
- Closed: 7 October 2012; 14 years ago
- Replaced by: D17

Availability

Terrestrial
- Digital terrestrial television: Channel 17

Direct Star was a French free-to-air music television channel owned by Vincent Bolloré, that launched on 1 September 2010, replacing Virgin 17. The channel was bought by Canal+ Group and replaced by CStar on 7 October 2012.

== History ==
=== Bolloré's development in TNT ===
On 10 June 2010, Bolloré Group, which already owned Direct 8, bought the Virgin 17 channel from Lagardère Active for a sum that would amount to approximately €70 million, excluding the takeover of staff (20 people) and part of the programs. On 12 July 2010, the CSA gave its agreement for this repurchase. Yannick Bolloré, future general manager of the channel, indicated it would be renamed Direct Star and announced its intention to keep the music-centric format of the channel and even to « strengthen the place of music in the first and second part of the evening » in a « more urban and contemporary » universe. Bolloré Group appointed Christophe Sabot (former manager at NRJ and Virgin 17) as director of the channel. On 27 July 2010, the group unveiled in a press release the new identity of Direct Star created by the Parisian agency Dream On, which is part of the graphic charter of the group's media activities. The Direct Star website went live on 16 August 2010.

On 1 September 2010, at midnight, Direct Star took over from Virgin 17 and broadcast its first music video, Lady Gaga's Alejandro. That same day, at 8 pm, Direct Star officially replaced Virgin 17, with a giant alarm clock-shaped countdown as a launch program followed by a parody of an episode of the 30 Rock series.

After its thematic evening devoted to music with Star Story, on 2 December, the channel launched Star Report, a new thematic evening devoted to the world of luxury.

On 17 December 2010, Direct Star was the first TNT channel to broadcast a live concert. This is -M- who ended his tour at Les Saisons de passage, at Paris-Bercy.

On 26 December 2010, Direct Star broadcast unpublished images of the last concerts and an exclusive interview with Jean-Michel Jarre. Numericable will broadcast an exclusive 3D program on "My 3D Channel".

On 1 July 2012, in an opinion piece the CSA published on the sale of the two chains of the Bolloré Group, the financial losses of these two chains appeared. From 2005 through 2010, Direct Star lost 61 million euros. Since the chain did not belong to Bolloré, but to Lagardère before mid-2010, the group was not responsible for these losses. In 2010, on a turnover of 23.7 million euros, the channel suffered an operating loss of 13.5 million euros and Direct Star's revenue growth was 56%.

=== Buyout by Canal+ ===
On 5 September 2011, the Canal+ Group announced its intention to acquire 60% of Bolloré Média (with a 100% option within three years) which would make it the new owner of Direct Star. This transaction was to be validated by the French Competition Authority in order to be finalized. When the takeover was announced, Bertrand Meheut declared in an interview given in Les Échos that the programming of the two channels would evolve « gradually, in line with their current editorial policy and those of the Canal+ group channels ». The transaction was signed between the two groups in December 2011.

In January 2012, Canal+ appointed Ara Aprikian to head the new free channels division of the Canal+ Group. He is notably in charge of the transformation and integration of Direct Star into the style and editorial policy of Canal+. At this time, he proposed to the CSA a reduction, from 75% today to 50% in the long term, of the airtime reserved for musical programs on the channel, i.e. a reduction of one-third of the airtime currently reserved for the music. In March 2012, Canal+ presented its proposals for film, sports, and advertising rights to the Autorité de la concurrence to obtain authorization for the buyout.

On 23 July 2012, the French Competition Authority accepted the buyout of Direct 8 and Direct Star, subject to conditions, by the Canal+ Group. The CSA validated the operation on 18 September 2012, and the effective takeover from the Bolloré Group of its two former channels, Direct 8 and Direct Star, was finalized on 27 September 2012. On that date, the two channels were under the full operational control of Canal+ Group, who decided to change the name of Direct Star to "D17" on Sunday, 7 October 2012, at 8:45 pm.

== Programmes ==
=== Music ===
- Star Music
- Top Direct Star
- Top Club
- Top France
- Top Hip-Hop
- Top Rock
- + 2 Music
- Star Story

=== Other ===
- Morning Star
- Zap Direct Star
- Sport Extrême
- Star Report
- Star Player
- Poker

=== Series ===
- Degrassi
- 30 Rock
- The Wire
- 24
- The Dead Zone
- The L Word
- Skins
- Dead Zone
- Alias
- Yes, Dear ! (VF)
- Shameless
- Flight of the Conchords
- Ma vie de star
- Underbelly
- Forces Spéciales

=== Anime ===
- One Piece
- Fullmetal Alchemist
- Black Butler
- Fullmetal Alchemist: Brotherhood
- Dragon Ball Z
- Bleach
- Fairy Tail

=== Reality TV ===
- America's Next Top Model
- Regime Tempo (VF)
- True Beauty (VF)
- Janice Dickinson Modeling Agency
- Parle à ma mère !
- Keeping Up with the Kardashians (VF)

== See also ==
- Direct 8
- Bolloré
- Vivendi
- Télévision Numérique Terrestre
