= Oüi FM =

OÜI FM
- Paris; France
- Broadcast area: France
- Frequencies: 102.3 MHz (Paris); Full list of frequencies

Programming
- Language: French
- Format: Rock
- Affiliations: Les Indés Radios

Ownership
- Owner: Groupe 1981 (Jean-Eric Valli)

History
- First air date: 1986; 40 years ago

Links
- Website: www.ouifm.fr

Oüi FM (styled OÜI FM) is a French rock radio station created in 1987, and since 2019 owned by Groupe 1981 of Jean-Eric Valli.

== History ==
OÜI FM was created in 1986 as a radio station with primarily Underground programming, and so its slogan was Le son qui a du sens (The Sound with Sense). The station was launched by Pierre Raiman, Philippe Mazière, Bertrand Jullien and Éric Mettout.

OÜI FM was part of Virgin Radio International until December 2008, when it was bought by the French radio and TV host Arthur and became part of his group known as the Arthur World Participation Group (AWPG). In 2019 Groupe 1981 (which already owns stateloos like Sud Radio and Latina) bought Oui FM. Groupe 1981 is owned by Jean-Eric Valli.

=== Web radio stations ===
- OÜI FM Alternatif
- OÜI FM Blues
- OÜI FM by DJ Zebra
- OÜI FM Collector
- OÜI FM Indé

== Broadcasting area ==
Ouï FM can be heard mainly in the North of France, on 102.3 FM in Paris, 102.1 FM in Melun and 90.7 FM in Chantilly, as well as via the Astra 1H satellite.
