= Lagardère News =

Media activities arm of Lagardère Group

- Company type: Wholly-owned subsidiary
- Industry: Media
- Founded: November 6, 2000; 25 years ago in Paris, France
- Parent: Lagardère Group
- Website: www.lagardere.com/societes-et-marques/lagardere-news/

Lagardère News, formerly known as Lagardère Active, is the media activities arm of the French Lagardère Group. It owns the radio stations Europe 1, Europe 2 and RFM, and the newspaper Le Journal du Dimanche.

Its subsidiaries include Lagardère's radio operations, television networks, and book and magazine publishers.

== History ==
In October 2000, the Lagardère Group announced that they're bringing together its media division with all of its audiovisual and new media activities Europe 1 Communication (radio, advertising and audiovisual management) and Lagardère Net (formerly Grolier interactive ) under one single brand named Lagardère Active which will be divided into two companies named Lagardere Active Broadcast and Lagardere Active Broadband.

In December 2006, Lagardère announced that they had merged Lagardére Active with Hachette Filipacchi Médias to form the new worldwide media division under the Lagardère Active name. Their advertising agencies Lagardère Active Publicite and Interdeco had been merged into France's most largest advertising company named Lagardère Publicité known internationally outside France as Lagardère Global Advertising. One day later, Lagardère Active had announced they signed an agreement to acquire Newshub to increase their fast-growing media activities.

In January 2011, it was announced that Lagardère Active had sold their international magazine business including their British titles Inside Soap to New York-based American multinational newspaper and magazine company and the owner of Cosmopolitan magazine Hearst Communications.

In January 2013, Lagardère Active announced that they had acquired online ticket service BilletRèduc.com.

In 2018, Arnaud Lagardère announced that Lagardère would be disposing of its media assets, which they carried out throughout the year. This included their stake in Marie Claire, their radio businesses in Eastern Europe and Africa, and their press titles in France, including Elle.

== Activities ==
Lagardère News' businesses are radio broadcasting, programming, television production, grouped in the Lagardère News structure, magazine publishing and an advertising management activity. They used to have a film distribution until 2020 when they sold their film, television and entertainment division to Mediawan.

=== Internet ===
- Newsweb (100%)
  - Europe 1 Sports
  - LeJdd.fr
  - Parismatch.fr
  - Europe1.fr
- Selma (100%)
  - Mood.fr

== Former activities ==
=== Television channels ===
It was announced that M6 Group had made a deal with Lagardère Active to buy the latter's channels.

=== Lagardère Studios ===
Lagardère Studios (formerly known as Lagardère Entertainment) was a French entertainment production arm of Lagardère Active that specialises in television programming.

In March 2009, Lagardère Entertainment announced that they brought a 51% majority stake in French unscripted entertainment company Electron Libre Productions.

In September 2012, Lagardère Entertainment announced that their rebranding their distribution subsidiary Europe Images International to Lagardere Entertainment Rights to reflect their parent company's ties between their production and distribution activities.

In October 2013 after dropping out of their bid to acquire Sweden's Nice Entertainment, Lagardère Entertainment had announced that their exiting the animation industry and ceasing their animation production by selling their animation subsidiary Genao Productions to OuiDo! Entertainment founders and Genao managers Sandrine Nguyen and Boris Hertzog and rebranding Genao as OuiDo! Productions with Lagardère Entertainment's distribution arm Lagardère Entertainment Rights retained Genao Productions's back catalogue.

In February 2015, Lagardère Entertainment under their own distribution company Lagardère Entertainment Rights announced that they had acquired international distribution company The Box Distribution and was interrogated into their own distribution arm.

In May 2015, Lagardère Entertainment alongside their parent company Lagardère Active had brought an 82% majority stake in Spanish-based entertainment and drama production company Grupo Boomerang TV and placing it under Lagardère Entertainment becoming Lagardère Entertainment's first international acquisition outside of France and their first expansion into the international television market along with their expansion of their operations into Spain & their entry into the Spanish television market with Grupo Boomerang TV founders Pepe Abril and Pedro Ricote continued to run the company under Largarère Entertainment.

In September 2015, Lagardère Active and its president and CEO Denis Olivennes had announced that they are rebranding their entertainment group by renaming their entertainment television arm Lagardère Entertainment to Lagardère Studios to focus on international development with the rebranded entertainment arm being reorganised into four major division groups.

In October 2017, Lagardère Studios announced that they had entered the Finnish television industry by acquiring a majority stake in Finnish-based factual and unscripted entertainment production company Alto Media Group from Content Media Corporation thrust expanding their operations to Finland for the first time and marking their second international acquisition following their acquisition of Spanish production company Boomerang TV two years prior with Alto Media Group's programme catalog now being distributed by Lagardère Studios' distribution arm.

In March 2018, Lagardère Studios announced that they've expanded their global footprint into the Netherlands with the acquisition of a majority stake in Dutch-based factual format production company Skyhigh TV thrust growing Lagardère's television division and strengthen their international TV production.

In October 2019, Lagardère Studios announced that they've launched a production label dedicated to international programming named Cameron's with Jean-Charles Felli and Christophe Tomas the founders of Save Ferris Studio became co-CEOs of the production label.

In June 2020 when Lagardère Studios' parent company Lagadère Group announced that it was restructuring its operations, it was also announced that Lagardère Group was selling their entertainment production and distribution division Lagardère Studios along with its production subsidiaries to European-based French audiovisual and international production group Mediawan for €100 million in order for Lagardère Group to focus on their publishing and travel retail operations. The deal could also expand Mediawan's production portfolio and its international operations into other countries. Five months later in November of that same year, Lagardère Studios and their parent company Lagardère Group announced that they've completed their sellout of Lagardère's entertainment production and distribution division Largardère Studios along with its production subsidiaries and its distribution arm to European-based French audiovisual and international production company Mediawan with Lagardère Studios being folded into the latter company thrust turning Mediawan into a European production powerhouse.

== See also ==
- Lagardère Active topics
- Lagardère Media companies
