= 14th Canadian Screen Awards =

Awards ceremony for film, TV, and digital media of 2025

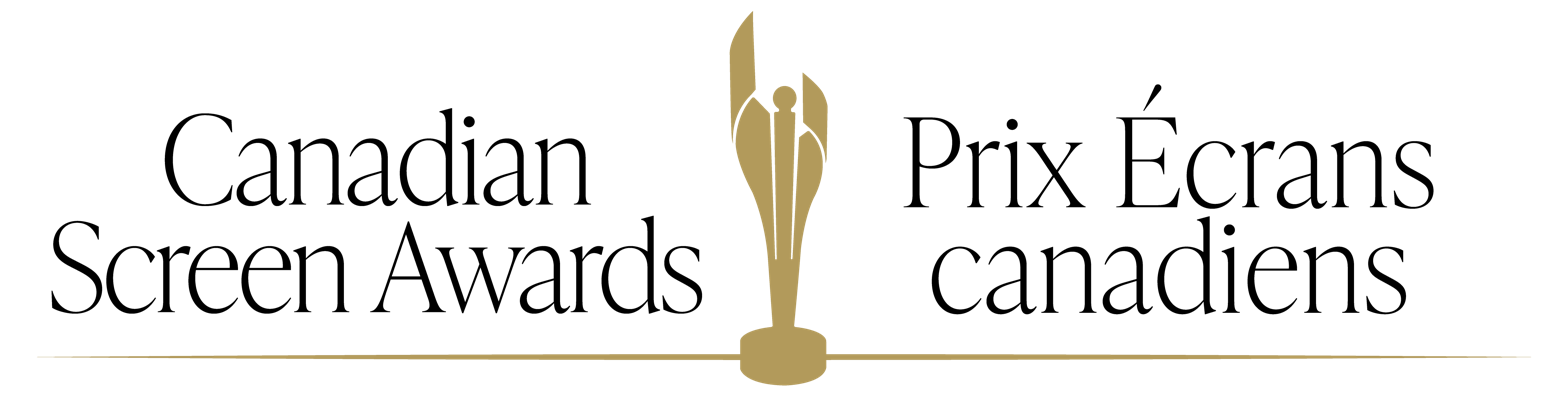
- Date: May 31, 2026
- Location: Canadian Broadcasting Centre; Toronto, Ontario
- Hosted by: Andrew Phung

Highlights
- Most awards: 40 Acres (film, 9); Heated Rivalry (TV, 16)
- Most nominations: 40 Acres (film, 10); North of North (TV, 20)
- Best Motion Picture: Nirvanna the Band the Show the Movie
- Best Dramatic Series: Heated Rivalry
- Best Comedy Series: North of North

Television/radio coverage
- Network: CBC Television; CTV; Global; CBC Gem; Crave; StackTV

The 14th Canadian Screen Awards were presented by the Academy of Canadian Cinema and Television on May 31, 2026, to honour achievements in Canadian film, television and digital media production in 2025. The ceremony was hosted by Andrew Phung, and took place at the Canadian Broadcasting Centre in Toronto.

The academy announced a new multi-broadcaster partnership, which saw the ceremony broadcast live in simulcast by CBC Television, CTV, and Global (including CTV/Global partner station NTV in Newfoundland and Labrador), as well as being streamed on CBC Gem, Crave and StackTV.

Nominations for the awards were announced March 25. The film 40 Acres topped the field in film categories, with ten nominations, while North of North led the television categories with 20 nominations. Heated Rivalry won 16 awards, including Best Dramatic Series, while Nirvanna the Band the Show the Movie won Best Motion Picture.

== Ceremony information ==
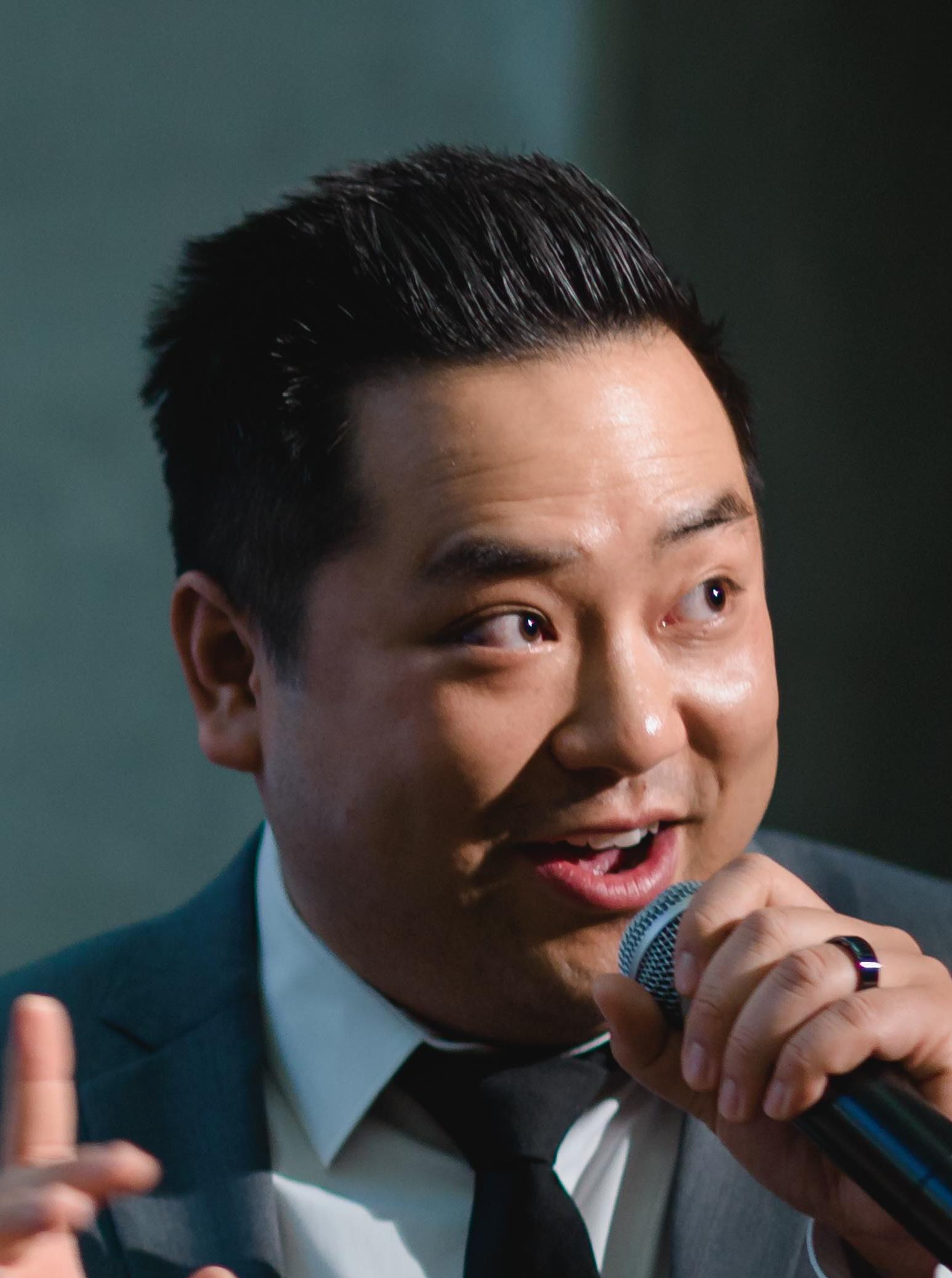
Andrew Phung, main ceremony host

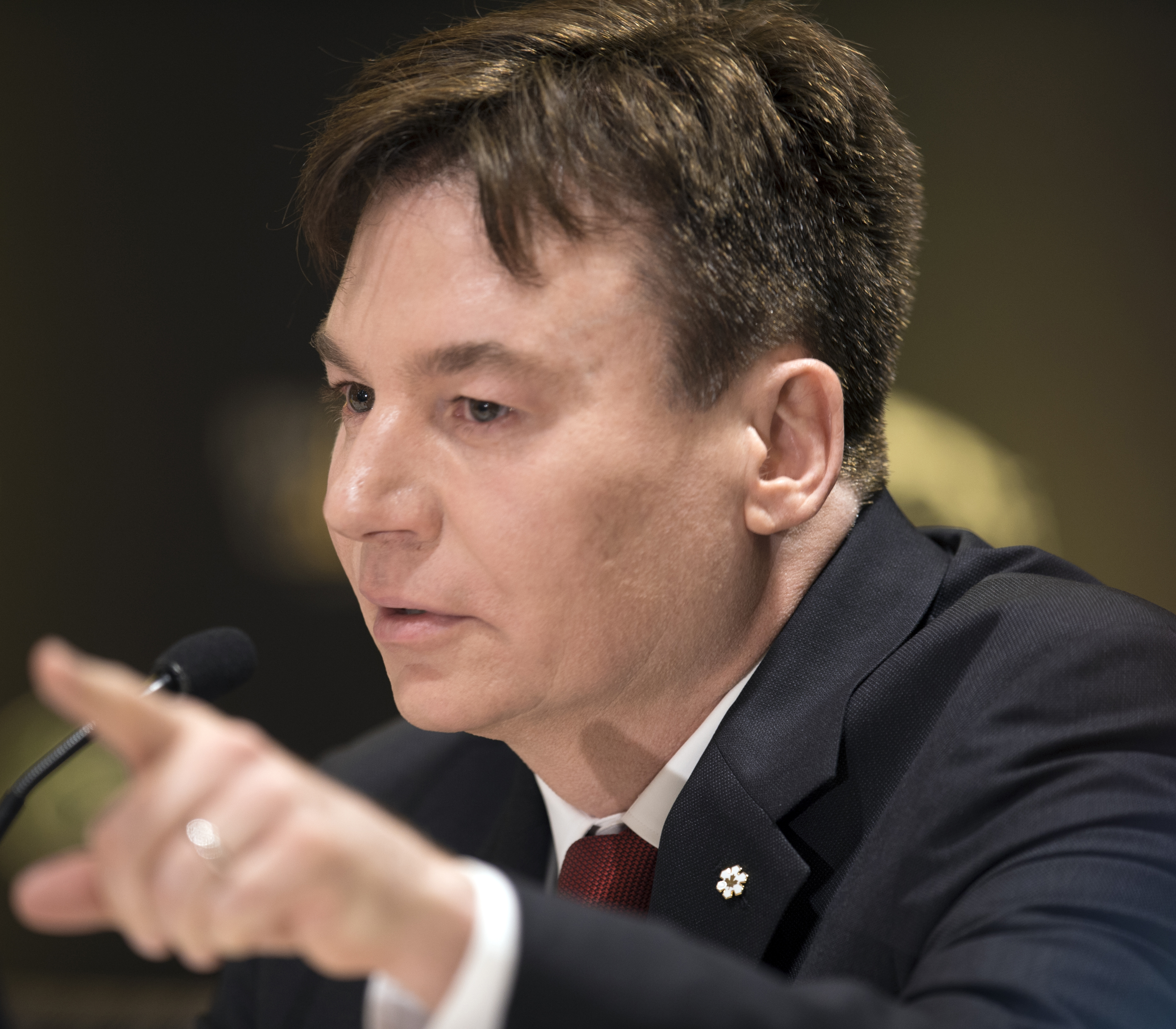
Mike Myers, Academy Icon Award honouree

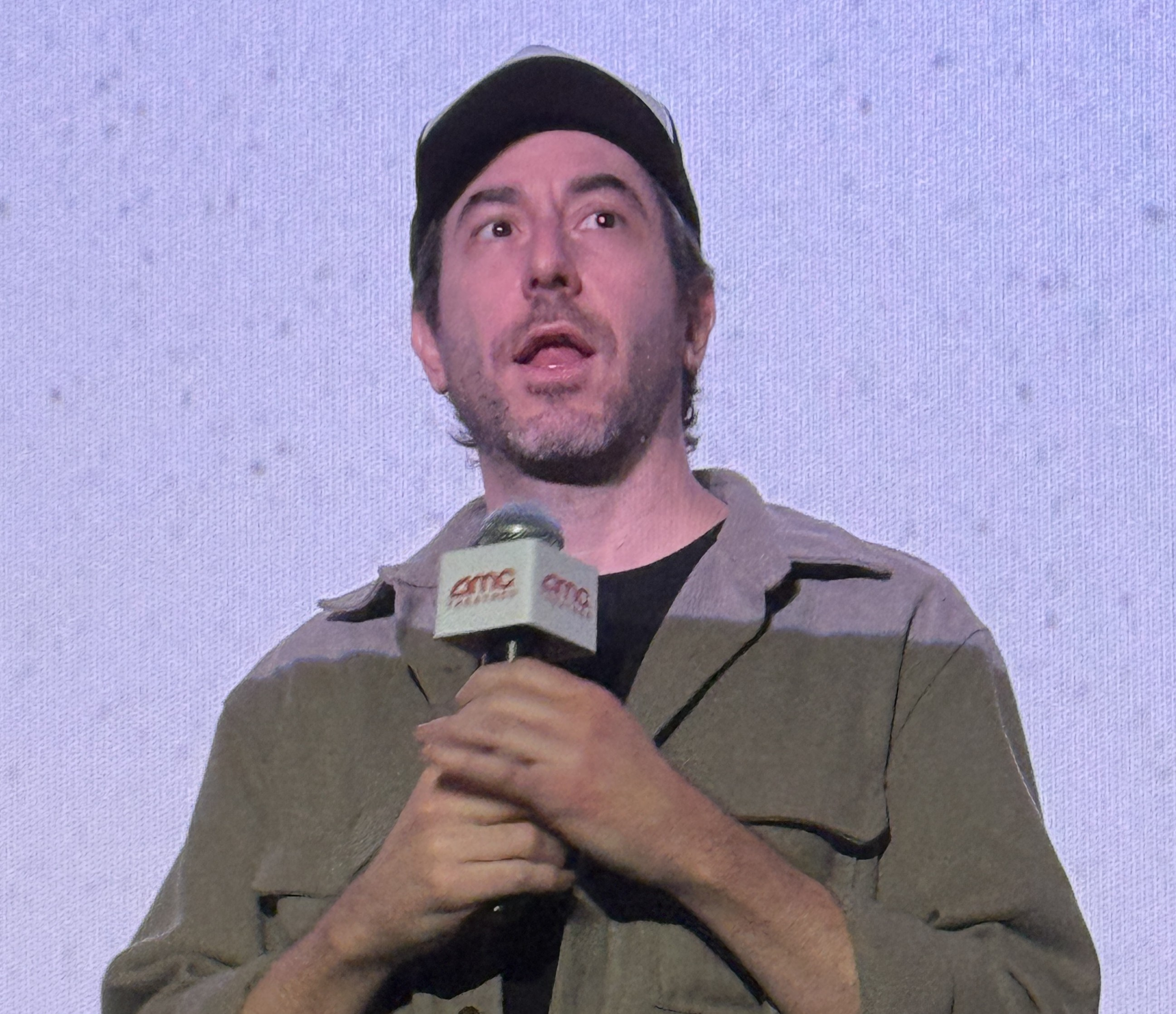
Jay McCarrol, Best Lead Performance in a Comedy Film and Best Original Song winner

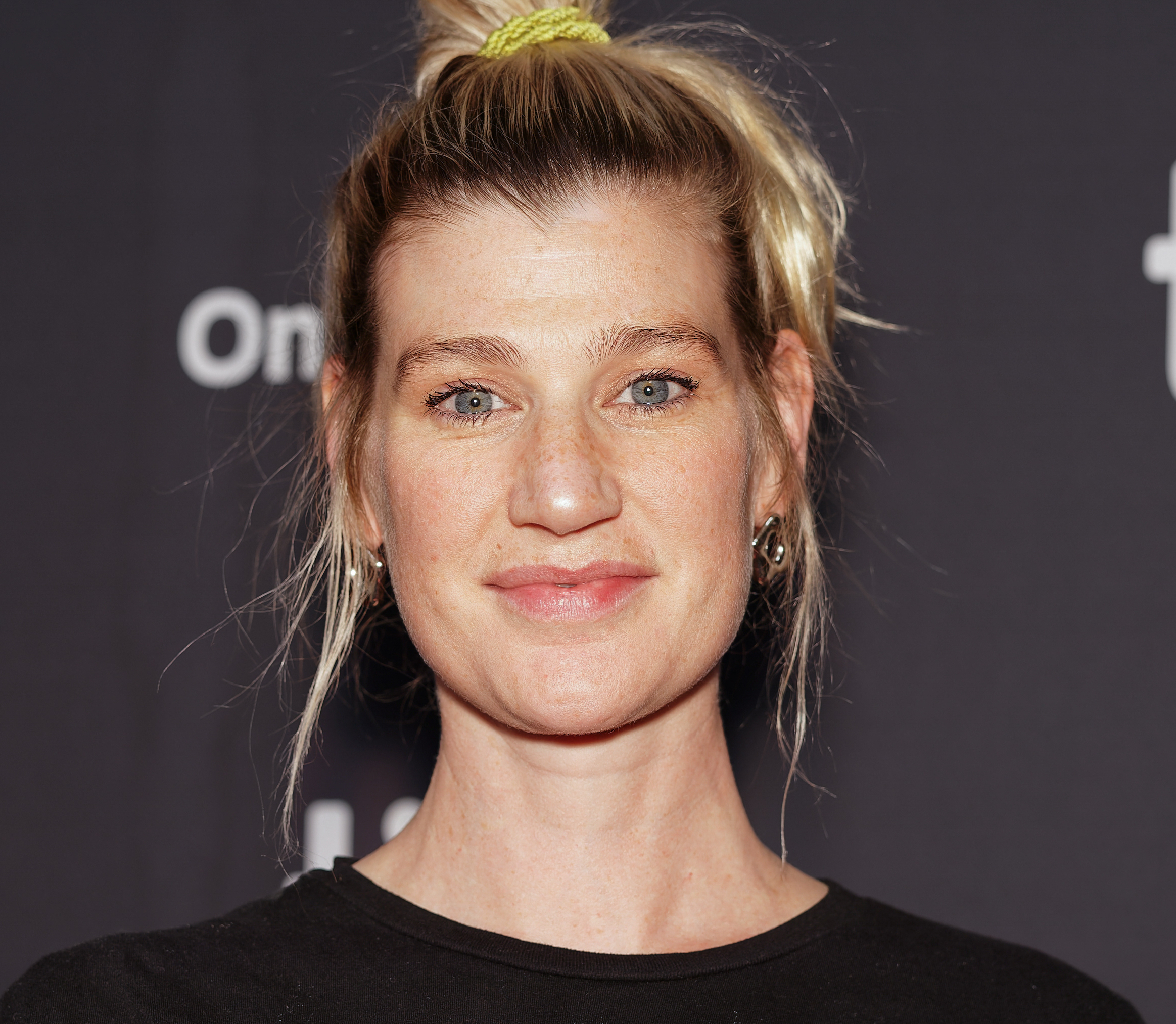
Grace Glowicki, Best Lead Performance in a Drama Film winner

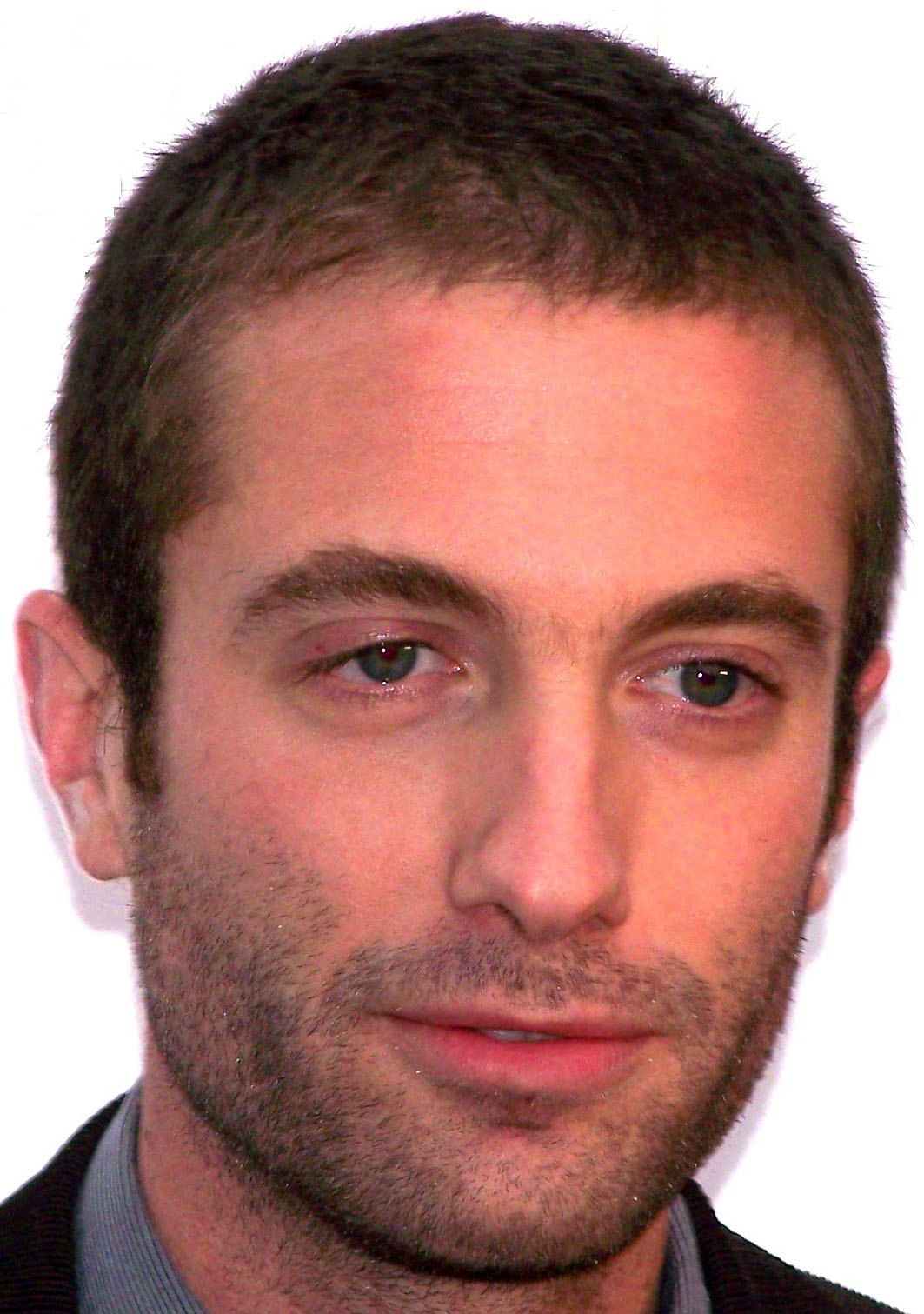
Jacob Tierney, Best Drama Series winner

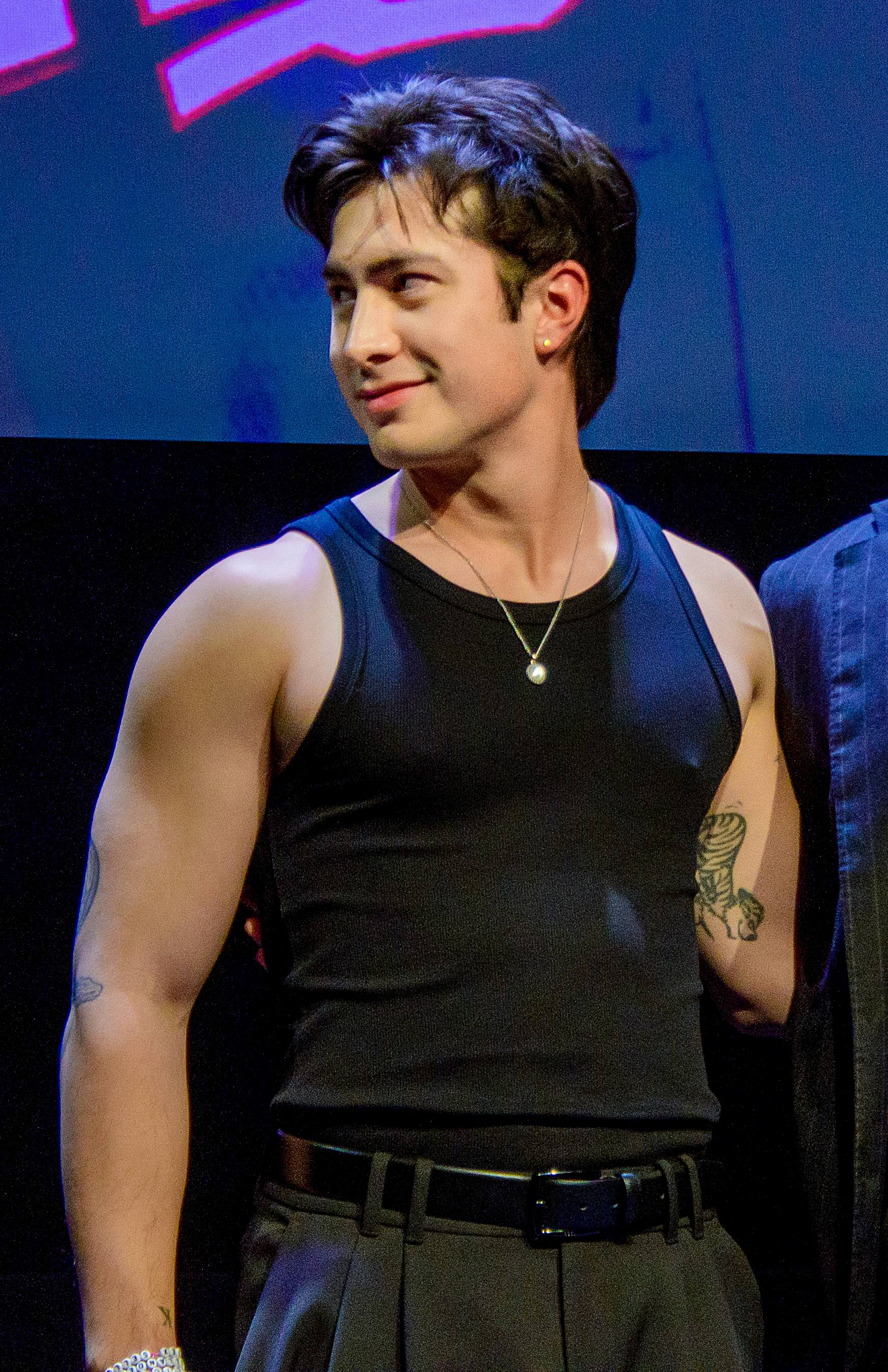
Hudson Williams, Best Lead Performance in a Drama Series winner

In January 2026, the Academy announced that in addition to broadcasting on CBC Television and streaming on CBC Gem, the ceremony would also be simulcast by CTV, Global, and their streaming services Crave and StackTV. CEO Tammy Frick explained that increased awareness in Canadian sovereignty had built interest in a multi-network simulcast, and that Bell and Corus accepted offers from the Academy to simulcast the ceremony on their networks and services alongside CBC's continued support.

From May 28 to 30, multiple ceremonies were held to distribute awards in many categories outside the main ceremony. The Children's Television Awards were hosted by Devo Brown, the Cinematic Arts Awards were hosted by Anne-Marie Withenshaw, the Broadcast News & Sports Awards were hosted by Heather Butts and Jennifer Hsiung, the Scripted Television Awards were hosted by Ennis Esmer and Jackie Pirico, and Jess Allen hosted the Unscripted Television Awards.

=== Category changes ===
The Academy announced a number of category changes in September 2025. Most notably, eligibility in acting categories became restricted to Canadian actors, following industry feedback after three of the four film acting awards at the 13th Canadian Screen Awards were won by international actors rather than Canadian performers. Four new "Spotlight" categories were also introduced, one each for actors, directors, writers and producers, to honour Canadian talent for their work on international television shows that were filmed partially or entirely in Canada, but were not Canadian productions in order to be eligible for consideration in regular categories.

The categories for Best Host for a Live Entertainment Special, Best Variety or Entertainment Special, Best Performance in a Variety or Sketch Comedy Program or Series, Best Picture Editing in Animation and Best Host of a Talk Show or Entertainment News Program were discontinued, and a new category was introduced in the Digital Media categories for Creator of the Year, to honour Canadian content creators who have had an impact on social media platforms.

=== Presenters ===
- Priyanka and Eden Grinshpan – presented Best Lead Performance in a Comedy Series
- Karine Vanasse and Supinder Wraich – presented Best Lead Performance in a Drama Film
- Hudson Williams – presented the Radius Award
- Allan Hawco and Anna Lambe – presented Best Lead Performance in a Comedy Film
- Natalie Spooner and Ryan McDonald – special appearance
- Dan Shulman, the Toronto Blue Jays, and Ron MacLean – presented the Gordon Sinclair Award
- Lori Idlout – special appearance
- Eugene Levy – tribute to Catherine O'Hara
- Tia Wood – performed "Sage My Soul" during the in memoriam segment
- George Stroumboulopoulos – presented Best Lead Performance in a Drama Series
- Laurence Leboeuf and Shamier Anderson – presented Best Motion Picture
- Andrew Phung – presented the Audience Choice Award
- Peter Mooney and Lauren Ash – presented Best Comedy Series
- Eddie Murphy, Cameron Diaz, Will Arnett, and Dave Foley – presented the Academy Icon Award
- Mae Martin – presented Best Drama Series

== Special awards ==
Several special award recipients were announced on March 4. One more was announced on April 16.

- Academy Icon Award – Mike Myers
- Gordon Sinclair Award – Hazel Mae
- Changemaker Award – Maxine Bailey
- Sustainable Production Award – Mile End Kicks
- Radius Award – Sophie Nélisse

== Film ==
Best Motion Picture	Best Direction
Nirvanna the Band the Show the Movie — Matthew Miller, Matt Greyson; 40 Acres — Jennifer Holness; Blue Heron — Ryan Bobkin, Sara Wylie, Sophy Romvari; The Cost of Heaven (Gagne ton ciel) — Hany Ouichou; Follies (Folichonneries) — Laurie Pominville, Hany Ouichou, Éric K. Boulianne; Lovely Day (Mille secrets mille dangers) — Kim McCraw, Luc Déry; The Things You Kill — Alireza Khatami, Michael Solomon; Wrong Husband (Uiksaringitara) — Samuel Cohn-Cousineau, Jonathan Frantz	R. T. Thorne, 40 Acres; Éric K. Boulianne, Follies (Folichonneries); Alireza Khatami, The Things You Kill; Zacharias Kunuk, Wrong Husband (Uiksaringitara); Sophy Romvari, Blue Heron; Heather Young, There, There
Best Lead Performance in a Comedy Film	Best Lead Performance in a Drama Film
Jay McCarrol, Nirvanna the Band the Show the Movie; Éric K. Boulianne, Follies (Folichonneries); France Castel, The Furies (Les Furies); Catherine Chabot, Follies (Folichonneries); Neil Elias, Lovely Day (Mille secrets mille dangers); Karine Gonthier-Hyndman, Two Women (Deux femmes en or); Patrick Hivon, Peak Everything (Amour Apocalypse); Laurence Leboeuf, Two Women (Deux femmes en or)	Grace Glowicki, Honey Bunch; Milya Corbeil Gauvreau, Fanny; Jasmin Geljo, Cat's Cry; Marlene Jewell, There, There; Theresia Kappianaq, Wrong Husband (Uiksaringitara); Nina Kiri, Out Standing; Michaela Kurimsky, Sweet Angel Baby; Noah Parker, Who by Fire (Comme le feu)
Best Supporting Performance in a Comedy Film	Best Supporting Performance in a Drama Film
Matt Johnson, Nirvanna the Band the Show the Movie; Devon Bostick, Mile End Kicks; Catherine Chabot, Compulsive Liar 2 (Menteuse); Juliette Gariépy, Two Women (Deux femmes en or); Graham Greene, Sweet Summer Pow Wow; Agathe Ledoux, Follies (Folichonneries); Hassan Mahbouba, Lovely Day (Mille secrets mille dangers); Rose-Marie Perreault, Lovely Day (Mille secrets mille dangers)	Elle-Máijá Tailfeathers, Sweet Angel Baby; Paul Ahmarani, Who by Fire (Comme le feu); Aurélia Arandi-Longpré, Who by Fire (Comme le feu); Edik Beddoes, Blue Heron; Monia Chokri, Where Souls Go (Où vont les âmes?); Micheline Lanctôt, Where Souls Go (Où vont les âmes?); Katie Mattatall, There, There; Leah Panimera, Wrong Husband (Uiksaringitara)
Best Original Screenplay	Best Adapted Screenplay
R. T. Thorne and Glenn Taylor, 40 Acres; Alexandre Auger and Éric K. Boulianne, Follies (Folichonneries); Alexandre Auger and Mathieu Denis, The Cost of Heaven (Gagne ton ciel); Alireza Khatami, The Things You Kill; Chandler Levack, Mile End Kicks; Sophy Romvari, Blue Heron	Mélanie Charbonneau and Martine Pagé, Out Standing; Philippe Falardeau, Lovely Day (Mille secrets mille dangers); Catherine Léger, Two Women (Deux femmes en or)
Best Feature Length Documentary	Best Short Documentary
Endless Cookie — Seth Scriver, Peter Scriver, Daniel Bekerman, Alex Ordanis, Chris Yurkovich, Jason Ryle, Neil Mathieson; James Bay 1975: The Shock of Two Nations (Baie James 1975 : le choc des nations) — Marie-Pierre Corriveau, Karine Dubois, Ernest Webb, Catherine Bainbridge, Myriam Berthelet, Mathieu Fournier, Mélanie Lameboy, Archita Ghosh, Daniel Morin; Lilith Fair: Building a Mystery — Dan Levy, Ally Pankiw, Christina Piovesan, Noah Segal; Spare My Bones, Coyote! (Mais où va-t-on, coyote?) — Dominique Dussault, Jonah Malak; The Track — Ryan Sidhoo, Graham Withers	The Muse — Wanda Nolan, Liz Cowie, Rohan Fernando, Nathalie Cloutier; King's Court — Serville Poblete, Kate Vollum, Chanda Chevannes; La Mayordomía — Martin Edralin; My Memory-Walls (Mes murs-mémoires) — Axel Robin; Send and Receive — Dominique Keller
Best Live Action Short Drama	Best Performance in a Live Action Short Drama
Year of the Dragon — Giran Findlay Liu; Himalia — Catherine Boily, Rosalie Chicoine Perreault, Clara Milo, Juliette Lossky; Karupy — Kalainithan Kalaichelvan, Shaista Roshan, Alison Almeida; Little Victories (Les petites victoires) — Rafaël Beauchamp, Laurie Pominville; Thin Walls — Robert Armanyous, Dayyaan Jameel	Fiona Fu, Year of the Dragon; Sumathy Balaram, Karupy; Charles-Alexis Desgagnés, A Dying Tree (La Peau de l'autre); Siobhan Connors, Headcase; Noam Desbiens-Lépine, Himalia; Jamie Thomas King, The Light Before the Sun; Lee Lawson, Thin Walls; Hannan Younis, Halfway Haunted
Best Animated Short	John Dunning Best First Feature
The Girl Who Cried Pearls (La jeune fille qui pleurait des perles) — Chris Lavis, Maciek Szczerbowski, Julie Roy, Marc Bertrand, Christine Noël; Bread Will Walk — Alex Boya, Jelena Popović; The Gnawer of Rocks (Mangittatuarjuk) — Louise Flaherty; Ibuka, Justice — Mylène Augustin, Justice Rutikara; Sosuke the Duck — Bekky O'Neil	40 Acres, R. T. Thorne; 100 Sunset, Kunsang Kyirong; Blue Heron, Sophy Romvari; Dinner with Friends, Sasha Leigh Henry; Follies (Folichonneries), Éric K. Boulianne; Where Souls Go (Où vont les âmes?), Brigitte Poupart
Best Art Direction/Production Design	Best Cinematography
Peter Cosco, 40 Acres; Kerry Noonan and Malcolm McKenzie, Nirvanna the Band the Show the Movie; Antonin Sorel, The Train (Le Train); Joshua Turpin, Honey Bunch; Joshua Turpin and Chloé Olson, Deathstalker	Jeremy Benning, 40 Acres; Andrew Appelle, Deathstalker; Edith Labbé, 1+1+1 Life, Love, Chaos (1+1+1 La vie, l'amour, le chaos); Catherine Lutes, There, There; Nikolay Michaylov, Measures for a Funeral; Ronald Plante, Yunan; Jared Raab, Nirvanna the Band the Show the Movie; J Stevens, Really Happy Someday
Best Costume Design	Best Editing
Melinda Dempster, Madeleine Sims-Fewer and Heather Hedley, Honey Bunch; Chelsea Graham, Deathstalker; Leslie Kavanagh, Whistle; Crystal Silden, All the Lost Ones; Mara Zigler, Measures for a Funeral	Simone Smith, Mile End Kicks; Matthieu Bouchard and Chloé Robichaud, Two Women (Deux femmes en or); Jane MacRae, Nika and Madison; Myriam Magassouba, Follies (Folichonneries); Kurt Walker, Blue Heron
Best Sound Editing	Best Sound Mixing
Ed Douglas and Dermain Finlayson, 40 Acres; Elma Bello, Gabe Knox, James Bastable and Michelle Irving, Mile End Kicks; Matthew Chan, Bret Killoran and Gabriella Wallace, Honey Bunch; Christopher Russell, Joe Scandella, Josh Fagen and Louis Duranleau, The Well; Jane Tattersall, Sue Conley and David Evans, Out Standing	Rudy Michael, Lucas Roveda, Dave Mercel and Adam Clark, Nirvanna the Band the Show the Movie; Matthew Chan, Honey Bunch; Michelle Irving, Jeremy Fong and Pablo Villegas, Mile End Kicks; Lou Solakofski and Maryan P’yatnochka, Nika and Madison; Brianna Todd and Carter Buckman, Sway
Best Original Score	Best Original Song
Todor Kobakov, 40 Acres; Suad Bushnaq, Yunan; Steph Copeland, It Feeds; Adrian Ellis and Walker Grimshaw, The Legacy of Cloudy Falls; Erica Procunier, Please, After You	Jay McCarrol and Matt Johnson, "The Alphabet Song" — Nirvanna the Band the Show the Movie; Brent Bodrug, Julian Stirpe and Siobhan Bodrug, "Wildflower" — Dream Eater; David Carriere and Jane Penny, "A/S/L" — Mile End Kicks
Best Makeup	Best Hair
Charlotte Gavaris and Chris Bridges, At the Place of Ghosts (Sk+te’kmujue’katik); Heather Jennings, Steven Kostanski and Patrick Baxter, Scared Shitless; Niamh McCann, Tenille Shockey and François Dagenais, Honey Bunch; Ashly Mckessock, Soul's Road; Erin Sweeney, Jaye Falcioni and Tanya Bishoff, Deathstalker	Sava Zeranska, Honey Bunch; Karola Dimberger, Whistle; Lyne Lapiana, Lovely Day (Mille secrets mille dangers); Pina Robinson, The Mother and the Bear; Toni Warren, At the Place of Ghosts (Sk+te’kmujue’katik)
Best Cinematography in a Documentary	Best Editing in a Documentary
Iris Ng, There Are No Words; Glauco Bermudez and François Messier-Rheault, Shifting Baselines; Marcel Mueller, Circo; Étienne Roussy, Among Mountains and Streams (Parmi les montagnes et les ruisseaux); Kyle Sandilands, Everest Dark	Nicole Bazuin, Modern Whore; Ricardo Acosta, Parade: Queer Acts of Love and Resistance; Cindy Au Yeung, Arthur Erickson: Beauty Between the Lines; Andrew Beach and Graham Withers, It's All Gonna Break; Greg Ng and Hart Snider, Saints and Warriors
Best Original Music in a Documentary	Best Sound Design in a Documentary
Tom Third, Modern Whore; Marc Bell, Spare My Bones, Coyote! (Mais où va-t-on, coyote?); Gagan Singh, Singhs in the Ring; Edo Van Breemen, The Track; Genevieve Vincent, The Stand	Andrew Zukerman, Endless Cookie; Sylvain Brassard, Spare My Bones, Coyote! (Mais où va-t-on, coyote?); Eli Haligua, Blair Moog, Fatih Ragbet and Gulay Acar, Fairy Creek; Gregor Phillips, D'wayne Murray, Ramsay Bourquin, May Guimarães, Alex Macia, Devon Quelch, Jake Kerr and Peter Robinson, Saints and Warriors; Simon Plouffe, Seeing Through the Darkness (Les yeux ne font pas le regard)
Best Visual Effects	Best Casting in a Film
Tristan Zerafa, Lou Gatti, Mike Stadnyckyj, Graham Houston, Toshi Kosaka, James Soares, Christopher Shewchuk, Jeniree Bastidas, Onur Can Yol and Luca Tarantini, Nirvanna the Band the Show the Movie; Matt Glover and Dave Sauro, Whistle; Marc Hall, Moon Marsolais, Vincent Campbell, David Atexide and Glavens Monfleury, Out Standing; Cody Kennedy, Deathstalker; Vineshh Vickinadas, Scared Shitless	Stephanie Gorin, 40 Acres; Sharon Forrest, All the Lost Ones; Tannaz Keshavarz-Agulto, Boxcutter; Angela Quinn and Katrin Braga, Blue Heron; Annie St-Pierre, Mile End Kicks
Stunt Coordination	Golden Screen Award
Angelica Lisk-Hann, 40 Acres; Alex Chung and Tyler Williams, Deathstalker; Dan Iaboni, Whistle; Chris Mark and Carl Fortin, Honey Bunch; Sébastien Rouleau, Tom Eirikson and Jordan Dodds, In Cold Light	Compulsive Liar 2 (Menteuse)

== Television ==
=== Programs ===
Best Drama Series	Best Comedy Series
Heated Rivalry — Jacob Tierney, Brendan Brady; Law & Order Toronto: Criminal Intent — Tassie Cameron, Erin Haskett, Amy Cameron, Alex Patrick, David Valleau, Tex Antonucci, Wanda Chaffey; Plan B — Louis Morissette, Louis-Philippe Drolet, Mélanie Viau, Jacques Drolet, Jean-François Asselin, Céleste Parr; Saint-Pierre — Allan Hawco, Erin Sullivan, Janine Squires, Robina Lord-Stafford, John Vatcher, Perry Chafe; Wild Cards — Michael Konyves, Shawn Piller, Charles Cooper, Virginia Rankin, Tashi Bieler, James Genn	North of North — Stacey Aglok MacDonald, Alethea Arnaquq-Baril, Miranda de Pencier, Garry Campbell, Anya Adams, Susan Coyne, Teresa M. Ho, Mike Goldbach, Fabrizio Filippo, Patricia Curmi; Children Ruin Everything — Mark Montefiore, Kurt Smeaton, Meaghan Rath, Anita Kapila, Chuck Tatham, Andrew De Angelis, Kathleen Phillips, Alyson Richards, Max Wolfond; Late Bloomer — Jasmeet Raina, Peter Huang, Ricky Dhawan, Shebli Zarghami, Laszlo Barna, Nicole Butler, Vanessa Steinmetz, Robbie David, Lakna Edirisinghe; Son of a Critch — Mark Critch, Andrew Barnsley, Tim McAuliffe, Allan Hawco, Perry Chafe, Amanda Joy, Shelby Bronstine, John Vatcher, Erin Sullivan, Janine Squires; The Trades — Gary Howsam, Ryan J. Lindsay, Robb Wells, Jonathan A. Walker
Animated program or series	Pre-School Program or Series
Super Team Canada — Alex Cichon, Joel Bradley, Will Arnett, Joel H. Cohen, Robert Cohen, Jennifer Twiner McCarron; Lana Longbeard — Mathew Huerto, Alice Prodanou, Paul Rigg; Snoopy Presents: A Summer Musical — Stephanie Betts, Josh Scherba, Logan McPherson, James Brown; Unicorn Academy — Jennifer Dodge, Ronnen Harary, Laura Clunie, Toni Stevens, Dan Mokriy, Mike G Moore; Wild Kratts — Vince Commisso, Blake Tohana, Chris Kratt, Martin Kratt, Cheryl Knapp, Coral Schoug	Daniel Tiger's Neighbourhood — Nora Keely, Blake Tohana, Natalie Osborne, Martin Sal, Ilene Louise Mitchell; Bestest Day Ever with My Best Friend — Georgina López, Rennata López, Chloe Gray; Let's Go, Bananas! — Vince Commisso, Natalie Osborne, Blake Tohana, Coral Schoug, Eric Gomes, Alicia Moore; Mittens & Pants — Phil McCordic, Shereen Ali, Norma Mendoza; Rubble & Crew — Jennifer Dodge, Ronnen Harary, Laura Clunie, Toni Stevens, Dan Mokriy, Dave Beatty
Children's or youth fiction	Children's or youth non-fiction
Odd Squad — Matthew J.R. Bishop, Mark De Angelis, Carla de Jong, Kirsten Hurd, J.J. Johnson, Blair Powers, Stephen J. Turnbull; Gangnam Project — Sarah Haasz, Anthony Leo, Andrew Rosen, Jennica Harper, Corey Liu; The Next Step — Ivan Schneeberg, David Fortier, Romeo Candido, Amy Cole, Jon Rutherford, Amy Wright, Andrée Bagosy, Duana Taha, Jan Caruana, Bradley Vermunt; The Unstoppable Jenny Garcia — Jonathan Finkelstein, Chantal Lafleur, Catherine Hernandez, Mindy Laxer	Old Enough! — Matthew Hornburg, Mark J.W. Bishop, Donna Luke, Kirsten Hurd, Natasha Negrea, Mitch Burman; CBC Kids Reads — Emily Houghton, Lisa Wisniewski, Daniel Fernandes, Andrew Hicks, Gagan Sagoo; Collar of Duty Kids — Laura Lillie, Raj Pannikar, Christopher Szarka; Green Squad — Jonathan Finkelstein, Mindy Laxer, Stephanie Blanshay, Kirsten Hurd
TV Movie	History Documentary Program or Series
Dying in Plain Sight — Vanessa Aprile-Welfle, Suzanne Berger, Kyle Cooper, Hannah Pillemer, Jason Wan Lim, Arnie Zipursky, Bonnie Zipursky, Dayna Zipursky; The 13th Wife: Escaping Polygamy, Part 1 — Darren Robson, Garrett VanDusen; Dateless to Dangerous: My Son’s Secret Life — Jordana Aarons, Vanessa Aprile-Welfle, Suzanne Berger, Hannah Pillemer, Arnie Zipursky, Dayna Zipursky; Guess Who — Graham Ludlow, Kaleigh Kavanagh, Shari Segal, Matt Wells, Bruno Goulard; Pins and Needles — Bill Marks, Justin Rebelo, Christopher Giroux, Jesse Ikeman	Who Killed the Montreal Expos? — Marie-Christine Pouliot, Richard Speer, Stéphanie Thibault; The Christine Jessop Story — James Hyslop, Joanne Virgo, AJ Demers, Erik Barmack, Folklaur Chevrier; Mafia: Most Wanted — Trish Dolman, Sherry Fynbo, Steven Thibault; Mysteries of the Ancient Dead — Daniel Oron, Natasha Ryan; Stuff the British Stole — David Brady, Kate Harrison Karman, Felicity Justrabo
Documentary program	Factual series
The Loneliest Race — Hannah Donegan, Ann Shin, Erica Leendertse; Gold Bars: Who the Fuck Is Uncle Ludwig? — Danny Webber, Billie Mintz; Lucas: An Endangered Human Species — Vincent Leroux, Sonia Bérubé; The Pitch — Michèle Hozer, Bryn Hughes, Nathalie Cook; Tootoo — Adam Scorgie, Shane Fennessey, Jim Wright, Rocky Mudaliar, Jade Ansell, Scottie Upshall	Dark Side of the Ring — Howard Shefman, Guillermo Garcia, Jason Eisener; 50,000 First Dates: A True Story — Carrie Mudd, Brent Hodge; The Assembly — Sean De Vries, Stephen Sawchuk; Crime Scene Investigators — Tanya Blake, Sherri Rufh, Michael Sheehan; Into the Void — Barry Davis, Jason Eisener, Guillermo Garcia
Biography or Arts Documentary Program or Series	Lifestyle Program or Series
Blue Rodeo: Lost Together — David W. Brady, Kate Harrison Karman, Paul Johnson, Susan de Cartier, Corey Russell, Francine DiBacco, Dale Heslip; Bam Bam: The Sister Nancy Story — Ngardy Conteh George, Alison Duke; Beethoven’s Nine: Ode to Humanity — Jason Charters, Liam Romalis; eTalk: "Phenomenon" — Beth Maher, Manny Groneveldt, Cody Kreller, Jesse Scheer; Play It Loud! How Toronto Got Soul — Andrew Munger	Drag Brunch Saved My Life — Mark "Priyanka" Suknanan, Daniel Birnbaum, Justin Stockman, Bruno Dubé, Marlo Miazga, Kim Bondi, Corinna Lehr; Chuck and the First Peoples Kitchen — Simon Villeneuve, Carlos Soldevila; Pamela's Cooking with Love — Robert Hardy, David Freeman; Scott's Vacation House Rules — Scott McGillivray, Angela Jennings, Kelly Wray, Bernice Kim, Nanci MacLean; Wild Rose Vets — Tania Koenig-Gauchier, Shirley A. McLean, David Way, Dominique Basi
Reality/Competition Program or Series	Live entertainment special
The Traitors Canada — Eric Young, Nathalie Brigitte Bustos, Denis Savard, Jacob Tierney, Justin Stockman, Mathieu Ouellet, David Gauthier; The Amazing Race Canada — John Brunton, Mark Lysakowski, Danielle Pearson, Bertram Van Munster, Elise Doganieri, Sarah James, Robyn Bigué, Ann Camilleri, Ken Katigbak, Catherine Peterson, Marc Poirier, Vanessa Rennard, Jesse Storey, Michael Tersigni, Monika Geresz, Anthony Matkovic, Jon Montgomery; Canada's Drag Race — Trevor Boris, Lori Greenberg, Matthew Hornburg, Mark J.W. Bishop, Laura Michalchyshyn, Donna Luke, Justin Stockman, Spencer Fritz, Brett Ashley, Tomás Maturana; Canada's Ultimate Challenge — Erin Brock, John Brunton, Phil Gurin, Mark Lysakowski, Robyn Bigué, Cory Bell, Chris Carter, Liam Colle, Janel Hirdes, Mark Holland, Ken Katigbak, Lauren McCuaig, Catherine Petersen, Jesse Storey, Rose Marra; Dragons' Den — Molly Middleton, Toni Francis, Alicia Chirrey	Juno Awards of 2025 — Michael Bublé, Lindsay Cox, Allan Reid, John Brunton, Tracy Galvin, Del Cowie, Leah Gauthier, Anthony Matkovic, Jennifer Paterson, Kristine Pleau, Jordan Rudder, Erica McMaster, Mike Langevin, Luciano Casimiri, Kristeen Von Hagen, Kim Wheeler; Canada's Got Talent: "Season 5 Finale" — Scott McGillivray, Nanci MacLean, Claire Adams, Michela Di Mondo, Jenny Heap; eTalk: "After the Oscars" — Beth Maher, Steve Jarman, Manny Groneveldt, Angela Holmes, Ryan Thompson, Kate Frank, Dave Azoulay, Tyrone Edwards, Elaine Lui, Liz Trinnear; Remembering the Children: National Day for Truth and Reconciliation 2025 — Desiree Single, Alain Dondo, Sharol Stewart, Vanessa Loewen, Crystal Dubois; This Hour Has 22 Minutes: "Vote Canadian: A 22 Minutes Election Special" — Mike Allison, Michael Donovan, Meaghan Clark, Carl Gosine, Tracey Jardine, Dana Landry
Science or Nature Documentary Program or Series (Rob Stewart Award)	Social/Political Documentary Program (Donald Brittain Award)
The Birdman of Cooper Island — Kevin McMahon, Michael McMahon; The Good Virus — Rosie Dransfeld, Vanessa Dylyn; Hunt for the Oldest DNA — Niobe Thompson; Incandescence — Shirley Vercruysse; The Nature of Things: "Animal Pride" — Carolyn Whittaker	The Fifth Estate: "The Shadow War on Libraries" — Allya Davidson, Emmanuel Marchand, Rachel Ward, Grant LaFleche; The Good Canadian — Leena Minifie, David Paperny, Sarah Jane Flynn; Marketplace: "The Secret Cost of Housing" — Jeremy McDonald, Nelisha Vellani, Sneha Agrawal, Tomi Joseph Raji; The Ozempic Effect: Beyond The Waistline — Paul Kemp, C. Hudson Hwang, AJ Leitch; W5's Avery Haines Investigates: "Our Son the Terror Suspect" — Avery Haines, Joseph Loeiro
Comedy special
People of Comedy — Dan Bennett, Shane Corkery, Anton Leo, Kenny Robinson, Zoe Rabnett, Darrell Faria, Catherine McCartney, Ryan Goldhar; Halifax Comedy Festival: "Trent McClellan" — Geoff D'Eon, Moya Walsh; The New Wave of Standup: "Use Me Like the Filthy Bag I Am" — Heather Wallace, Sylvain Parent-Bedard, Nick Brazao, Marie-Claude Filteau, Blake Gregory; Winnipeg Comedy Festival: "Customer Disservice" — Jamie Brown, Stephanie Fast, Dean Jenkinson

=== Actors ===
Lead performance, drama	Supporting performance, drama
Hudson Williams, Heated Rivalry; François Arnaud, Heated Rivalry; Carolina Bartczak, Plan B; Allan Hawco, Saint-Pierre; Michelle Morgan, Heartland; Kathleen Munroe, Law & Order Toronto: Criminal Intent; Melanie Scrofano, Revival; Supinder Wraich, Allegiance	Sophie Nélisse, Heated Rivalry; Wendy Crewson, Irish Blood; Eve Edwards, Bet; Amy Goodmurphy, Wild Cards; Ksenia Daniela Kharlamova, Heated Rivalry; Yanna McIntosh, Hell Motel; Kataem O'Connor, Murdoch Mysteries; Karen Robinson, Law & Order Toronto: Criminal Intent
Lead performance, comedy	Supporting performance, comedy
Anna Lambe, North of North; Meredith MacNeill, Small Achievable Goals; Anastasia Phillips, The Trades; Jasmeet Raina, Late Bloomer; Meaghan Rath, Children Ruin Everything; Jermaine Richards, The Office Movers; Mary Walsh, The Missus Downstairs; Jennifer Whalen, Small Achievable Goals	Maika Harper, North of North; Raoul Bhaneja, The Trades; Tricia Black, Small Achievable Goals; Braeden Clarke, North of North; Rodrigo Fernandez-Stoll, Son of a Critch; Lucas Lopez, The Office Movers; Alexander Nunez, Small Achievable Goals; Mikayla SwamiNathan, Children Ruin Everything
Performance in a guest role in a comedy series	Performance in a guest role in a drama series
Tanya Tagaq, North of North; Tom Green, The Trades; Dan Jeannotte, North of North; Susan Kent, Son of a Critch; Patrick McKenna, 1 Man's Treasure; Rick Mercer, Son of a Critch; Siddharth Sharma, Late Bloomer; Sugith Varughese, Late Bloomer	Nadine Bhabha, Heated Rivalry; Ennis Esmer, Law & Order Toronto: Criminal Intent; Ayesha Mansur Gonsalves, Saint-Pierre; Eric McCormack, Hell Motel; Michelle Monteith, Saint-Pierre; Sarah Podemski, Law & Order Toronto: Criminal Intent; Noah Reid, Murder in a Small Town; Anusree Roy, Allegiance
Ensemble performance in a comedy series	Sketch comedy show and ensemble performance
North of North — Anna Lambe, Maika Harper, Braeden Clarke, Zorga Qaunaq, Jay Ryan; The Office Movers — Jermaine Richards, Trevaunn Richards, Heather Gallant, Lucas Lopez, Hassan Phills, Michael Charles, Solomon Kehinde, Danny Martinello, Zachariah Hamed; Small Achievable Goals — Meredith MacNeill, Jennifer Whalen, Leslie Adlam, Jeanne Beker, Tricia Black, Paul Braunstein, Georgie Murphy, Alexander Nunez, Gord Rand, Kevin Whalen; The Trades — Robb Wells, Anastasia Phillips, Jennifer Spence, Jennifer Irwin, Dan Petronijevic, Raoul Bhaneja, Enrico Colantoni, Jesse Camacho, Brandon Oakes, Susan Kent, Jason Daley, Patrick McKenna, Dave Lawrence, Aaron Poole, Jordan Poole	This Hour Has 22 Minutes — Mike Allison, Michael Donovan, Meaghan Clark, Carl Gosine, Tracey Jardine, Dana Landry, Mark Critch, Trent McClellan, Aba Amuquandoh, Stacey McGunnigle, Chris Wilson; Abroad — Isabel Kanaan, Kevin Wallis, Lucy Stewart, Wayne Testori, Meghan Hood, PJ Wilson, Aldrin Bundoc, Justin Santiago, Nicco Lorenzo Garcia, Joy Castro; Hey Halifax, Hello! Today! — Taylor Olson, Koumbie, Adam DeViller, Bob Mann
Lead performance in a children's or youth program or series	Supporting performance in a children's or youth program or series
Asha Soetan, Odd Squad; Byron Abalos, The Unstoppable Jenny Garcia; Ava Louise Murchison, The Unstoppable Jenny Garcia; Shailyn Pierre-Dixon, Macy Murdoch	Josette Jorge, The Unstoppable Jenny Garcia; Lana Carillo, The Unstoppable Jenny Garcia; Haven Markus, The Unstoppable Jenny Garcia; Kristopher Turner, Ruby and the Well
Performance in a television film or miniseries	Voice performance
Raffa Virago, Dying in Plain Sight; Erica Cerra, A Dance in the Snow; Delia Lisette Chambers, Jingle Bell Love; Chelsea Clark, Pins and Needles; Alexander Elliot, Dateless to Dangerous: My Son's Secret Life; Keeya King, Guess Who; Corteon Moore, Guess Who; Olga Petsa, The 13th Wife: Escaping Polygamy, Part 2	Will Arnett, Super Team Canada; Dhirendra, Super Team Canada; Kamaia Fairburn, Unicorn Academy; Emily Hampshire, The Bravest Knight; Rain Janjua, Daniel Tiger's Neighbourhood; Ron Pardo, Paw Patrol; Patty Sullivan, Mittens & Pants; Mia SwamiNathan, Mittens & Pants

=== News and information ===
National newscast	Local newscast
APTN National News; CTV National News; Global National; The National	CBC News: Compass; CityNews Toronto; CTV News Vancouver at 6; Global News Hour at 6 BC
News anchor, national	News anchor, local
Dawna Friesen, Global National; Adrienne Arsenault, The National; Omar Sachedina, CTV National News; Michael Serapio, CPAC 2025 Election Special	Cynthia Mulligan, CityNews Toronto; Debra Arbec, CBC Montreal News at 6; Michelle Dubé and Nathan Downer, CTV News Toronto at 6; Mi-Jung Lee, CTV News Vancouver at 6; Sophie Lui and Chris Gailus, Global NewsHour at 6 BC
National reporter	Local reporter
Margaret Evans, The National; Mike Armstrong, Global National; Judy Trinh, CTV National News	Afua Baah, CityNews Toronto; Josh Crabb, CBC News Winnipeg; Leah Hendry, CBC News Montreal; Sis'moqon, CBC Indigenous
News or information program or series	News or information segment
W5's Avery Haines Investigates; APTN Investigates; The Fifth Estate; Marketplace; The Thread with Nam Kiwanuka	The National: "We Visited a Palestinian Village – Then Israeli Settlers Showed Up"; APTN Investigates: Inside Policing: "Deadly Force"; CBC Investigates: "Inside Canada's Fascist Fight Clubs"; CBC News: Here & Now: "Pure Hell: Tracking Cocaine from Colombia to Canada"; CBC Ottawa at 6: "Bandages Over Bullet Holes"
Live news special	Talk series
CBC News Network: "The King in Canada: Speech from the Throne"; CBC News: "A New Pope"; CTV News: "Election 2025"; CTV News: "Trudeau Resignation"	Power & Politics; eTalk; The Good Stuff with Mary Berg; The Social
Host or presenter, news or information program or series	Host or presenter, factual or reality/competition
Mark Kelley, The Fifth Estate; Avery Haines, W5's Avery Haines Investigates; Kenneth Jackson, APTN Investigates; Vassy Kapelos, Question Period; Asha Tomlinson, Marketplace	Brooke Lynn Hytes, Brad Goreski and Traci Melchor, Canada's Drag Race; Gerry Dee, Family Feud Canada; Jonny Harris, Still Standing; Colin Mochrie, Old Enough!; Andrew Phung, Big Burger Battle
Host, lifestyle
Priyanka, Drag Brunch Saved My Life; Mary Berg, The Good Stuff with Mary Berg; Tyrone Edwards, Elaine Lui, Traci Melchor, Chloe Wilde, Sonia Mangat and Liz Trinnear, eTalk; Melissa Grelo, Cynthia Loyst, Andrea Bain and Jessica Allen, The Social; Dina Pugliese, Breakfast Television

=== Sports ===
Live sporting event	Sports analyst
4 Nations Face-Off: Canada vs USA — Jeff Girodat, Paul Gris, Brian Spear, Rob Corte, Joel Darling, Ed Hall (Sportsnet); 111th Grey Cup — Christi Jordan, Jon Hynes, Dennis Baluyot, Paul Graham, John Rusin, Andy Bouyoukos (TSN); 2025 Stanley Cup Final: Oilers vs Panthers Game 6 — Ed Hall, Rob Corte, John Szpala, Brian Spear, Jeff Girodat (Sportsnet); 2025 IIHF Women's World Championship: Gold Medal Game — Arden Doidge-Flynn, Sam Cicirello, Dawn Landis, Aislin Doidge-Flynn, Meghan Redwood (TSN)	Kevin Bieksa, Hockey Night in Canada; Kia Nurse, Raptors on TSN; Brian Stemmle, CBC Sports; Luke Wilson, SC with Jay Onrait
Sports host	Sports play-by-play
Stefanie Reid, 2024 Paralympic Games; James Duthie, TSN Hockey; Ron MacLean, Hockey Night in Canada; Andi Petrillo, Professional Women's Hockey League: "New York vs. Toronto"	Dan Shulman, Blue Jays on Sportsnet; Chris Cuthbert, 4 Nations Face-Off: Canada vs USA; Rod Smith, CFL on TSN; Rob Snoek, CBC Sports
Sports feature segment	Sports opening
"Man of the City" — Matthew Dorman, Sara Bonnetta, Sean Dunnam, Mark Utley; "Todd Simpson: Flame Fighter" — Mark Wade, Mark Utley, Scott Lennox, Jeremy McElhanney; "Branded: The Elic Ayomanor Story" — Matthew Dorman, Sara Bonnetta, Farhan Lalji, Curry Leamen, Steve Denheyer; "Mark and Julia: The Last Goodbye" — Stephen Paine, Shi Davidi, Devon Burns, David Tredgett, Brodie Thiessen, Tim Hagoriles	Calgary Stampede Rangeland Derby Open – What Is Chuckwagon Racing? — Michael Little, Cindy Gillies, Steve Katakami, Georgiy Besedin, Mitch Lee, Todd Kimberley; 4 Nations Face-Off: Canada vs USA — Phillip Rzentkowski, Ryan Tonnellato, Kevin Fallis, Brian Spear, Carson Illidge, Ed Hall; 2025 Toronto Blue Jays Home Opener — Domenic Gentile, Hazel Mae, Andrew Cox, Kevin Fallis, Carson Illidge, Jake Levinsky; TradeCentre — Devon Burns, Sara Bonnetta, Steve Denheyer, Michael Lane, Matthew Cade, James Duthie
Sports program or series
Breaking Down Barriers — Mark Kristofic, Karen Zylak, Alex Browne; Raptors Delight — Paul Sidhu, Adrian Cheddie, Marc Macdonald, Vince Monteleone, Marc Wade, Jason McKinnon; Hockey Day in Canada — Joel Darling, Dee Hambly, Rod McLachlan, Jon Sanders, Matt Marstrom, Brian Spear; SC with Jay Onrait — Jay Onrait, Kyle Lawson, Thomas Csercsa, Greg Bonnetta, Eric O'Neill, Michael Harrison

=== Craft awards ===
Editorial research	Visual research
Sophie Charest and Nancy Audet, Who Killed the Montreal Expos?; Chantelle Bellrichard, Jennifer Chiu, Paul Barnsley, Derrick O'Keefe and Anna Mehler Paperny, The Good Canadian; Meagan Brown, Tania Cooper and Sheldon Shaw, Michelle Ross: Unknown Icon; Jalana Lewis, Bam Bam: The Sister Nancy Story; Rachel Ward, Grant LaFleche and Matthew Pierce, The Fifth Estate: "The Shadow War on Libraries"	Stefanie McCarrol, Tammy Egan and Judy Ruzylo, Lilith Fair: Building a Mystery; Juan Andrés Bello, João Vitor Corrêa, Casey Lees and Lanna Lucas, Mafia: Most Wanted: "Watch Your Back"; Amy Fritz, Bam Bam: The Sister Nancy Story; Shannon L'Hérault, Who Killed the Montreal Expos?; Thea Toole and Kyle Parry, Dark Side of the Ring
Make-Up	Hair
Viktor Peters, Canada's Drag Race; Deb Drennan, Murdoch Mysteries; Dorota Mitoraj and Mikey Elliott, North of North; Melanie Quigg, Karly Madill, Alexandra Anger, Monica Pavez and Sava Zeranska, Slasher: Hell Motel; Catherine Viot, Bet	Chrystal Lotz and Tasha Cadotte, North of North; Shirley Bond, Murdoch Mysteries; Renee Chan, Bet; Simone Finch, Law & Order Toronto: Criminal Intent; Kirsten Klontz, Canada's Drag Race
Costume design	Visual effects
Hanna Puley, Heated Rivalry; Charlene Akuamoah, Bet; Debra Hanson, North of North; Alison Ruth Hicks, Saint-Pierre; Joanna Syrokomla, Murdoch Mysteries	Simon Devault, Philippe Massonnat, Christophe Trepanier and Felix Arsenault, Heated Rivalry; Terry Bradley, Jake Fullerton, Susan Sullivan, Josh Joudrie, James Wallace, Kelly Milton, Jeff Robinson, Pedro Vilas, Ryan Smith and Nial McFadyen, Dino Dex; Andrew Szerszen, Mayday; Kevin Chandoo, Agnes Lim, Andy Chan, Lorne Kwechansky, Michael Key, Ken Nielsen, Andrew Nguyen, Alex Merritt-Gambrill, Zhou Zuo and Aditya Sawant, North of North; Terry Bradley, Daryl Shail, Teodora Ilie, James Wallace, Sean Kobus, Trevor Hunter, Nial McFadyen, Stephen Curran and Ryan Smith, Odd Squad
Production design/art direction in a fiction program or series	Production design/art direction in a non-fiction program or series
Aidan Leroux, Alder Dunlap and James McCrindle, Heated Rivalry; Andrew Berry, North of North; Ingrid Jurek, M-A Orenstein and Jenn Luckas, Small Achievable Goals; Rosalie Mackintosh and Mark Steel, Son of a Critch; Bob Sher, Murdoch Mysteries	Andrew Kinsella and Tara Smith, Canada's Drag Race; Monika Geresz, Alesa J. Fazio and Conor Pike, The Amazing Race Canada; Crystal Westland and Andy Roskaft, Drag Brunch Saved My Life; Vincent Perri and Michelle Tracey, Pharaohs: Rise & Fall; Pete Faragher, Kevin Halliday and Braden Labonte, Top Chef Canada
Casting, Fiction	Casting, Non-Fiction
Sara Kay and Jenny Lewis, Heated Rivalry; Stephanie Gorin, North of North; Sharon Forrest, Law & Order Toronto: Criminal Intent; Errin Lally and Annalese Tilling, Allegiance; Larissa Mair and Colleen Rush, Late Bloomer	Heather Muir, Canada's Drag Race; Daniel Klimitz, Top Chef Canada; Lauren McCuaig, Tanner Sawatzky and Jesse Storey, The Amazing Race Canada; Heather Muir, The Traitors Canada; Meredith Veats, The Great Canadian Baking Show

=== Photography ===
Photography in a comedy series	Photography in a documentary program or factual series
Gayle Ye, Late Bloomer: "Weekend at the Matthias'"; Jackson Parrell, North of North: "Top of the World"; Jason Tan, Son of a Critch: "Field Party"; Ann Tipper, Small Achievable Goals: "Making Work Friends"; Elad Winkler, The Office Movers: "Mans Are Movin' Different"	Iris Ng, Exclusion: Beyond the Silence; Mark Caswell, The Spoils; Gabriela Osio Vanden, Don't Come Upstairs; John Minh Tran, An Optimist's Guide to the Planet: "Reclaim"; John Minh Tran, The Pitch
Photography in a drama program or series	Photography in a lifestyle or reality program or series
Jackson Parrell, Heated Rivalry: "I'll Believe in Anything"; Mark Berlet, Murder in a Small Town: "Masterpiece"; Lindsay George, Wild Cards: "Con in 60 Seconds"; Mathieu Laverdière, Plan B: "Episode 3"; Michael Marshall, Sight Unseen: "About a Boy"	Ryan Shaw, The Amazing Race Canada: "I'm Just Practicing Falling"; Adam Burwell, Flat Out Food: "Sea Buckthorn"; Adam Gladstone, The Great Canadian Baking Show: "Arts and Crafts Week"; Claudio Manni, Beer Budget Reno: "No Booty in This Kitchen"; Charles-Philippe Martel, The Traitors Canada: "A Sacrificial Arrival"
Photography in a news or information program, series or segment
Jerry Vienneau, W5's Avery Haines Investigates: "Narco Jungle: The Death Train"; Ousama Farag, The Fifth Estate: "Dawson Creek: We Want Our Town Back"; Tom Fennario, APTN Investigates: "Something in the Water"; Josh Grummett and Tamara Pimentel, APTN Investigates: Inside Policing: "Deadly Force"

=== Editing ===
Editing in a children's or youth program or series	Editing in a comedy program or series
Olivia Shin and Kailey Birk, Old Enough!: "Where's the Ginger, Please?"; Marie-Pier Barrette, SuperKlaus; Steve Bedernjak, The Next Step: "Finale"; Fabiola Caraza, Gangnam Project: "Here Comes Astra"; Martin Maleček and Nick Shaw, Wild Kratts: "Mini Heroes Mighty Mouths"	Baun Mah, Late Bloomer: "New Canadian"; Thorben Bieger, The Trades: "Family Work Party"; Branden Bratuhin, The Office Movers: "Mans Are Movin' Different"; Pauline Decroix, Son of a Critch: "Happy 1990"; Sam Thomson, North of North: "Dumpcano"
Editing in a documentary program or series	Editing in a drama program or series
Eugene Weis, Bam Bam: The Sister Nancy Story; Steven Budd, Big Feminine Energy; Caitlin Durlak, Your Tomorrow; Michèle Hozer and Pauline Decroix, The Pitch; Guillaume Rodrigue, Who Killed the Montreal Expos?	Véronique Barbe, Heated Rivalry: "I'll Believe in Anything"; Katie Chipperfield, Allegiance: "The Vow"; Sandy Pereira, Revival: "A Rose and a Thorn"; Simone Smith, Bet: "The Speakeasy"; Arthur Tarnowski, Heated Rivalry: "Rose"
Editing in a factual program or series	Editing in a reality or competition program or series
Ryan Monteith, Ben O'Neil and Chelsea Bennett, 50,000 First Dates: A True Story: "Head Over Heels"; Clare Elson, Beer Budget Reno: "No Booty in This Kitchen"; Thomas Lieu and Peter Strauss, Dark Side of the Ring: "Becoming Muhammad Hassan"; Burak Ozgan, Dark Side of the Cage: "Nick Diaz"; Marc Ricciardelli and Peter Strauss, Dark Side of the Ring: "The Scream Queen: Daffney"	Lindsay Ragone, Canada's Drag Race: "Grand Finale"; Andrew Gurney, Elianna Borsa, Pat Fairbairn, Jessica Graore, Mike Scott and Craig Anderson, Top Chef Canada: "Origin Stories"; Al Manson, Elianna Borsa, Dan Cable, Frange Cruces, Ellora Dela Fuente, Chris Donaldson, Jonathan Dowler, Jessica Graore, Andrew Gurney, Alex Marsolais-Whicher, Ben O’Neil, Jeff Perry, Jenny Reed, Curtis Rogers, Keisha Rose, Jaime Sanchez, Heather Skeoch, Stephen Watt and Jon Wong, Canada's Ultimate Challenge: "The Bracelet"; Peter Topalovic, Canada's Drag Race: "Go Off Queen"; Alexy Veilleux, Francis Binet, Mathieu Boucher, J Deschamps, Chris Donaldson, Janelle Marsan and Jordan Tuff, The Traitors Canada: "A Sacrificial Arrival"

=== Sound ===
Sound in a fiction program or series	Sound in a documentary or factual program or series
Vincent Riendeau, Martin Messier, Joe Scandella, Natalie Fleurant, Simon Meilleur, Eric Med Lagacé, Peter Lopata and Valéry Dufort-Boucher, Heated Rivalry: "I'll Believe in Anything"; Stephen Barden, Jill Purdy, Jeremy Fong, Chris Cobain and Chad Hunt, Small Achievable Goals: "Family Matters"; Bryan Day, Mike Woroniuk, James Bastable, Will Stephens and Raiza Rodrigues, A Dance in the Snow; Martin Lee, J.R. Fountain, Brent Pickett, Rob Warchol, Joe Mancuso and Zenon Waschuk, Law & Order Toronto: Criminal Intent: "Face Value"; Peter Murphy, John Dykstra, Gabe Knox, Mike Woroniuk, Brent Pickett, Mark Dejczak, Ed Douglas, Virginia Storey and Rob Hegedus, North of North: "Top of the World"	Michelle Irving, Jordan Guy, Elma Bello and Derek Brin, Bam Bam: The Sister Nancy Story; Mike Duncan, The Spoils; Kalvin Mallari, Diana Bahirian and Brianna Todd, Don't Come Upstairs; Sanjay Mehta, Jason Hopfner, Ian Rodness, Jeremy Kessler and Deanna Marano, The Pitch; Velcrow Ripper, David Pullmer, Miguel Nunes, Alex Macia and Devon Quelch, Incandescence
Sound in a lifestyle, reality or entertainment program or series	Sound in an animated program or series
John Diemer, Scott Brachmayer, Rosie Eberhard, Levi Linton, Dane Kelly, Rob Taylor, Eric Leigh and Alastair Sims, Canada's Drag Race: "Go Off Queen"; Mark Krupka, Chandra Bulucon, Lisa Meitin and Luke McLean, Canada's Ultimate Challenge: "The Bracelet"; Mark Krupka, Luke McLean, Brian Gallant and Lisa Meitin, The Amazing Race Canada: "Double Roadblock"; Luke McLean, Mark Krupka, Chandra Bulucon and Lisa Meitin, Top Chef Canada: "Film Fest"; Mark Vreeken, Charles-Émile Beaudin, Doug McClement and Jeff Kozak, Juno Awards of 2025	Brendan Quinn, Ethan Myers, Julian Rudd, Art Mullin, Sebastian Biega, Drew Snyder, Levi Considine, Kevin Chamberlain, Chris Battaglia and Tyler Tsang, Unicorn Academy: "Winter Solstice"; Mike Mancuso, Let's Go, Bananas!: "Yelloween"; Mike Mancuso, Joe Tetreau, Sue Robertson, Ryan Eligh and Glenn Barna, Xavier Riddle and the Secret Museum: "I Am Matthew Henson"; Richard Spence-Thomas, Patton Rodrigues, Timothy Muirhead, Luke Dante, Bethany Masters and Kyle Peters, Rubble & Crew: "The Crew Lifts Up City Hall / The Crew Builds a Rotating Restaurant"

=== Directing ===
Animation	Children's or youth
Hong Qi, Xavier Riddle and the Secret Museum: "I Am Jackie Robinson"; Dianna Basso and Trevor Hierons, Rubble & Crew: "The Crew Makes Christmas Magical"; Louis Champagne and Chris Kratt, Wild Kratts: "Mini Heroes Mighty Mouths"; Tammy Langton, Daniel Tiger's Neighbourhood: "Daniel and Mom Make a Treat / Jodi Sleeps at Her Dad's House"; Shabnam Rezaei and Eddie Soriano, The Bravest Knight: "Cedric and the Gnomes"	Katie Boland, Macy Murdoch: "Tick, Tick, Gone"; J.J. Johnson, Dino Dex: "Dino Discovery: Part 1"; Ryan Marley, Old Enough!: "I'm Just Feeling My Nose"; Shelagh O'Brien, The Next Step: "The Comeback"; Felipe Rodriguez, Ruby and the Well: "I Wish I Could Land a Sweet Deal"
Comedy	Documentary program
Zoe Hopkins, North of North: "Carnivores"; Anya Adams, North of North: "Top of the World"; Fabrizio Filippo, Small Achievable Goals: "Work Wife Balance"; Sasha Leigh Henry, Children Ruin Everything: "Connection"; Warren P. Sonoda, The Trades: "Homeruns"	Alison Duke, Bam Bam: The Sister Nancy Story; Dale Heslip, Blue Rodeo: Lost Together; Jean-François Poisson, Who Killed the Montreal Expos?; Ali Weinstein, Your Tomorrow; Larry Weinstein, Beethoven's Nine: Ode to Humanity
Documentary series	Drama series
Stephanie Weimar, Stuff the British Stole: "Operation Legacy"; Cazhhmere Downey, Sounds Black: "The Seeds"; Trish Dolman, Mafia: Most Wanted: "Behind the Bosses"; Alison Duke, The Passionate Eye: "Michelle Ross: Unknown Icon"; Elizabeth Trojian, Foodspiracy	Jacob Tierney, Heated Rivalry: "I'll Believe in Anything"; Winnifred Jong, Law & Order Toronto: Criminal Intent: "Fool's Gold"; Sharon Lewis, Allegiance: "Shine a Light"; Nimisha Mukerji, Allegiance: "Daddy Issues"; Sudz Sutherland, Law & Order Toronto: Criminal Intent: "The Man in the Stadium"
Factual	Lifestyle and information
Heather Hawthorn Doyle, The Assembly: "Howie Mandel"; Rahul Chaturvedi, Rakesh Sidana and Sebastian Cluer, Bollywed: "God Only Made One Kuki"; Nikki Chow, Ghosting with Luke Hutchie and Matthew Finlan: "The Mine"; Sheona McDonald, Transplant Stories: "The Life You Give"; Daniel Oron, Cursed Histories: "The Curse of Tippecanoe, Oak Island, Knights Templar"	Gillian E. Parker, The Social: "2024 National Day for Truth & Reconciliation Special"; Priyanka Desai, Not Your Butter Chicken: "Food Is Sewa"; John Keffer, The Good Stuff with Mary Berg: "Halloween Special: Murder at the Manor"; Frederick Kroetsch and Shirley A. McLean, Wild Rose Vets: "Emergency Room"; Shawn Viens, Pamela's Cooking with Love: "Pamela and Chef Gregory Gourdet"
Live sporting event	Reality or competition program or series
Franklin Rubinstein, 2025 World Junior Ice Hockey Championships Gold Medal Game; Chris Phillips, Vinsanity: Celebrating a Legend; John Szpala, 2025 Stanley Cup Final: Oilers vs Panthers Game 6	Shelagh O'Brien, Canada's Drag Race: "Go Off Queen"; Rob Brunner, The Amazing Race Canada: "Canada Is Something Special"; Francis Côté and Rémy Ouellet, The Traitors Canada: "A Sacrificial Arrival"; Harbinder Singh, Battle of the Generations: "Battle 30"; Harbinder Singh, Dragons' Den: "Episode 1"
TV Movie	Variety or sketch comedy program or series
Michelle Ouellet, Dying in Plain Sight; Robert Adetuyi, We Three Kings; Stefan Brogren, Dateless to Dangerous: My Son's Secret Life; Anne De Léan, Jingle Bell Love; David J. Strasser, The Wish Swap	Jocelyn Corkum and Darrell Faria, This Hour Has 22 Minutes: "Fight of the Century"; Adam DeViller and Taylor Olson, Hey Halifax, Hello! Today!: "Jonathan Torrens"; Shelagh O'Brien, Celebrating Our Canada, Loud and Proud; Dave Russell, Canada's Got Talent: "Season 5 Finale"; Dave Russell, Juno Awards of 2025

=== Music ===
Best Original Music, Animation	Best Original Music, Comedy
Erica Procunier, Thomas & Friends: "The Christmas Letter Express"; Peter Chapman and Shaw-Han Liem, Go Togo: "Stella the Leader"; Jeff Morrow, Snoopy Presents: A Summer Musical; Brian Pickett, Graeme Cornies and James Chapple, Rubble & Crew: "The Crew Makes Christmas Magical"; Meiro Stamm, Xavier Riddle and the Secret Museum: "I Am William Shakespeare"	Caleb Chan and Brian Chan, North of North: "Top of the World"; Jonathan Goldsmith, The Trades: "Night Shift"; Nikhil Seetharam, Children Ruin Everything: "Sleepovers"; Thomas Westin, Benjamin Pinkerton and Ian LeFeuvre, Small Achievable Goals: "Judy Bloomed"
Best Original Music, Drama	Best Original Music, Documentary
Peter Peter, Heated Rivalry: "Rookies"; Lora Binder and Robert Carli, Ruby and the Well: "I Wish... I Wish... I Wish..."; Brian Chan and Caleb Chan, Allegiance: "Unsee This"; Spencer Creaghan, SurrealEstate: "Battleground"; Rob Melamed and Ryan McLarnon, Mistletoe Murders: "Twas the Fight Before Christmas, Part 2"	Orin Isaacs, Bam Bam: The Sister Nancy Story; Adrian Ellis, Into the Universe: Mysteries of the Cosmos: "Beyond the Singularity"; Tom Third, The Spoils; Russell Walker and Neil Chapman, The Pitch; Jesse Zubot, Josh Zubot and Jason Sharp, Mafia: Most Wanted: "Behind the Bosses"
Best Original Music, Factual, Lifestyle, Reality or Entertainment	Best Original Song
Nikhil Seetharam, Dark Side of the Cage: "The Disappearance of Ronda Rousey"; Todd Forsbloom, Coastal Carvings: "A Family Business"; Andrew Harris, Wildfire: "Passing the Torch"; Andrew Gordon Macpherson, Dark Side of the Ring: "The Scream Queen: Daffney"; Andrew Gordon Macpherson, Into the Void: "Dimebag Darrell"	Peter Peter, "It's You" — Heated Rivalry; James Chapple, Brian Pickett and Graeme Cornies, "Do It Your Way" — Daniel Tiger's Neighborhood; Steph Copeland, Matthew O'Halloran and Kibra Tesfaye, "Angel Shot" — Trapped in the Spotlight; Phil McCordic, Meiro Stamm and Antonio Naranjo, "Sneaking and Creeping" — Mittens & Pants; Jeff Morrow, "A Place Like This" — Snoopy Presents: A Summer Musical

=== Writing ===
Animated program or series	Children's or youth
Meghan Read and Desmond Sargeant, Xavier Riddle and the Secret Museum: "I Am Jackie Robinson"; Amy Brown, Xavier Riddle and the Secret Museum: "I Am Gwen Ifill"; Jocelyn Geddie, Mermicorno: Starfall: "Aftershocks"; Alice Prodanou, Lana Longbeard: "A Haunting, Ahoy"	Catherine Hernandez, The Unstoppable Jenny Garcia: "What Is Happening to Me?!"; Romeo Candido, The Next Step: "Dreamers in Tune"; Amy Cole, The Next Step: "Super Massive Mega Star"; Corey Liu, Gangnam Project: "Here Comes Astra"; Jay Vaidya, Macy Murdoch: "Tick, Tick, Gone"
Comedy series	Documentary
Stacey Aglok MacDonald and Alethea Arnaquq-Baril, North of North: "Top of the World"; Andrew De Angelis, Children Ruin Everything: "Sex"; Jennifer Goodhue, Small Achievable Goals: "Work Wife Balance"; Amanda Joy, Son of a Critch: "Happy 1990"; Meredith MacNeill and Jennifer Whalen, Small Achievable Goals: "Judy Bloomed"	Alison Duke, Bam Bam: The Sister Nancy Story; Mika Collins and Mike Lobel, Don't Come Upstairs; Alison Duke, Meagan Brown and Sami Tesfazghi, Michelle Ross: Unknown Icon; Jamie Kastner, The Spoils; Fred Peabody, Digital Tsunami: Big Tech, Big A.I., Big Brother; Elizabeth Trojian and Victoria Lean, Foodspiracy
Drama series	Factual
Jacob Tierney, Heated Rivalry: "I'll Believe in Anything"; Tassie Cameron, Law & Order Toronto: Criminal Intent: "Tango Romeo"; Ken Cuperus, Mistletoe Murders: "Cold War, Part 1"; Allan Hawco and Robina Lord-Stafford, Saint-Pierre: "Queen Bee"; Corey Liu, Family Law: "Play It Straight"	Jonny Harris, Fraser Young, Graham Chittenden and Aisha Brown, Still Standing: "Prince Rupert, BC"; Michael Allcock, Investigation Shark Attack: "California Great Whites"; Peter Esteves, Ghost Hunters of the Grand River: "Murney Tower"; Rob McCallum, Nintendo 64 Quest: "The Future Is Here"; Angie Pepper O'Bomsawin and Vincenzo Giannelli, Little Big Community: "Kitigan Zibi Anishinabeg"
Lifestyle or reality/competition program or series	Preschool program or series
Brandon Ash-Mohammed, Trevor Boris, Spencer Fritz and Jake Benaim, Canada's Drag Race: "Go Off Queen"; Eric Abboud, Deanne Marsh and Daniel Klimitz, Top Chef Canada: "Origin Stories"; Rob Brunner, Mark Lysakowski, Mark Peacock and Michael Tersigni, The Amazing Race Canada: "I'd Hug You But I Smell"; Rob Brunner, Mark Lysakowski, Paulina Robak and Michael Tersigni, The Amazing Race Canada: "Canada Is Something Special"; Nadine Djoury, The Great Canadian Baking Show: "Celebration Week"	Anne-Marie Perrotta, Toopy and Binoo: Fabulous Adventures: "Giggling Flufferoos"; Lindsay Lee, Go Togo: "Float Like a Boat"; Rennata López and Chloe Gray, Bestest Day Ever with My Best Friend: "Luna the Gecko's Bestest Day Ever"; Phil McCordic, Mittens & Pants: "Mittens & Pants Christmas Special"; Haslett Murphy, Mittens & Pants: "Abraca-Hamster"
Television film	Variety or sketch comedy program or series
Caitlin English, Dateless to Dangerous: My Son's Secret Life; Andrea Canning and Agnes Bristow, Love on the Danube: Love Song; Barbara Kymlicka, The Love Club Moms: Jo; Ryan Peckinpaugh, A '90s Christmas	Jordan Foisy, Mark Critch, Mike Allison, Jeremy Woodcock, Nigel Grinstead, Aba Amuquandoh, Chris Wilson, Stacey McGunnigle, Ashley Botting, Dan Dillabough, Allana Reoch, Ajahnis Charley, Alan Shane Lewis, Clare Belford, Kyle Hickey, Peter Anthony, Isabella Campbell and Bita Joudaki, This Hour Has 22 Minutes: "Oval Office Showdown"; Michael Bublé, Luciano Casimiri, Kristeen Von Hagen, Kim Wheeler and Yemie Sonuga, Juno Awards of 2025; D.J. Demers, Joze Piranian, Dan Barra-Berger and Michael McCreary, All Access Comedy; Isabel Kanaan, Kevin Wallis, Wayne Testori and Byron Abalos, Abroad: "Filipinos vs. Filipino Diaspora"

=== Spotlight ===
A new set of categories introduced in 2026, honouring Canadian talent for their work on international television productions that were filmed and broadcast in Canada, but did not otherwise meet the criteria to be considered as Canadian productions for eligibility in the traditional CSA categories.

Series	Direction
Wayward — Mae Martin, Jennifer Kawaja, Bruno Dubé, Mohamad El Masri, Andrea Glinski, Anna Beben; Jane — Tiffany Hsiung, J.J. Johnson, Blair Powers, Christin Simms, Andria Teather, Matthew J.R. Bishop, Sari Friedland; Top Chef: Destination Canada — Eric Abboud, Jessica Brunton; The Way Home — Suzanne Berger, John Calvert, Heather Conkie, Alexandra Clarke, Ani Kevork, Hannah Pillemer, Marly Reed, Arnie Zipursky	Sharon Lewis, Ginny & Georgia; John Fawcett, Wayward; Renuka Jeyapalan, Wayward; Michelle Latimer, The Way Home; Joyce Wong, The Sticky
Performance	Writing
Amanda Brugel, The Handmaid's Tale; Sarah Gadon, Wayward; Kris Holden-Ried, The Way Home; Mae Martin, Wayward; Ava Louise Murchison, Jane	Kayla Lorette, Wayward; Heather Conkie, The Way Home; Mohamad El Masri, Wayward; J.J. Johnson, Jane

== Audience awards ==
Cogeco Fund Audience Choice	Canada Media Fund Kids' Choice
Heated Rivalry; Allegiance; Canada's Got Talent; North of North; The Office Movers; Revival; Small Achievable Goals; Top Chef Canada; The Traitors Canada; Wayward	Mittens & Pants; Collar of Duty Kids; The Next Step; Old Enough!; Ruby and the Well

== Digital media ==
Original Program or Series, Fiction	Original Program or Series, Non-Fiction
Cows Come Home — Katie Uhlmann, Lindsey Middleton, Hari Ramesh, David Carruthers, Keri Ferencz; 18 to 35 — Rahul Chaturvedi, Charlie Whalley, Luisa Alvarez Restrepo, Andrew Phung; Coming Home — Samora Smallwood; Everybody's Meg — Terry Lynn Kearsey, Melani Wood, Becky Swannick, Maddy Foley, Katelyn McCulloch; You're My Hero — Kevin Wallis, Lucy Stewart, Sean Towgood, Cassidy Civiero, PJ Wilson, Meghan Hood, Colette Jeffs	County Blooms: A Flower Powered Adventure — Jen Pogue, Avi Federgreen, Michelle Jedrzejewski, Navin Ramaswaran, Chris Cull, Jessica Graore; About That with Andrew Chang — Tarannum Kamlani, Alex Kress, Andrew Chang; ACTRA Toronto at TIFF — Cass Enright, Gabriella de la Torre; eTalk Live at the Oscars — Beth Maher, Steve Jarman, Manny Groneveldt, Ryan Thompson, Cody Kreller, Alex Faubert, Tyrone Edwards, Elaine Lui, Liz Trinnear; Here & Queer — Peter Knegt, Mercedes Grundy, Lucius Dechausay, Chelle Turingan
Lead Performance in a Web Program or Series	Supporting Performance in a Web Program or Series
Alexander Nunez, Settle Down; Maddy Foley, Everybody's Meg; Emma Hunter, Dying Seconds; Lindsey Middleton, Cows Come Home; Samora Smallwood, Coming Home; Dylan Taylor, Dying Seconds; Sean Towgood, You're My Hero; Farid Yazdani, Day Players	Jean Yoon, 18 to 35; Nadine Bhabha, Settle Down; Izad Etemadi, Settle Down; Kevin Hanchard, A Tippling Adventure; Josette Jorge, Settle Down; Rong Fu, Dying Seconds; Tymika Tafari, Settle Down; Leighton Alexander Williams, Settle Down
Direction in a Web Program or Series	Host in a Web Program or Series
Katie Uhlmann, Cows Come Home: "The Teeth"; Rahul Chaturvedi, 18 to 35: "Buck Mustang"; Ngozi Paul, FreeUp! The Emancipation Day Special 2025; Samora Smallwood, Coming Home: "The Talent Show"; Samantha Wan, Dying Seconds: "Have I Told You About This Hockey Card?"	Jen Pogue, County Blooms: A Flower Powered Adventure; Lisa Berry, FreeUp! The Emancipation Day Special 2025; Andrew Chang, About That with Andrew Chang; Gabriella de la Torre, ACTRA Toronto at TIFF; Tyrone Edwards, Elaine Lui and Liz Trinnear, eTalk Live at the Oscars
Picture Editing in a Web Program or Series	Writing in a Web Program or Series
Jessica Graore, County Blooms: A Flower Powered Adventure: "Grow with the Flow"; Anna Catley, Settle Down: "First-Date Jitters"; Carroll Chiramel, 18 to 35: "The Overlooked Hostel"; Arielle Skolnik, Get Hooked: "Petrie Island"; Arielle Skolnik, Settle Down: "I've Got Butterflies!"	Andrew Chang and Courtney Dorrington, About That with Andrew Chang: "Charlie Kirk Shooting: Why Kill Him?"; Rahul Chaturvedi, 18 to 35: "London Calling"; Alexander Nunez, Settle Down: "Putting in the Work"; Samora Smallwood, Coming Home: "The Incel, the Pumpkins, and Family Drama"; Katie Uhlmann and Lindsey Middleton, Cows Come Home: "I Am Daisy Staplerton"
Creator of the Year
Julie Nolke; Basement Gang; Jesse Pollock; Pregnancy and Postpartum TV; Taha Likes You
