= Alexander Nunez =

Canadian actor and writer

- Occupations: Actor, writer
- Known for: Creating and starring in the web series Settle Down

Alexander Nunez is a Canadian actor and writer, most noted as the creator and star of the web series Settle Down.

He has also had regular roles in the web series Avocado Toast and Stories from My Gay Grandparents, and the television series Moonshine and Small Achievable Goals, and has been a writer for This Hour Has 22 Minutes.

In 2026 he had a supporting role in the thriller film In the Heart of the South.

He is out as queer.

== Awards ==
Award	Date of ceremony	Category	Work	Result	Ref.
Canadian Screen Awards	2022	Best Writing in a Variety or Sketch Comedy Program or Series	This Hour Has 22 Minutes with Heidi Brander, Adam Christie, Cathy Jones, Mark Critch, Trent McClellan, Jeremy Woodcock, Jordan Foisy, Aisha Brown, Nigel Grinstead, Aba Amuquandoh, Nadine Bhabha, Leonard Chan, Adele Dicks, Gillian Bartolucci, Chris Wilson, Dean Jenkinson, Matt Wright	Nominated	
Canadian Screen Awards	2026	Best Supporting Performance in a Comedy Series	Small Achievable Goals	Nominated	
Canadian Screen Awards	2026	Best Ensemble Performance in a Comedy Series	Small Achievable Goals with Meredith MacNeill, Jennifer Whalen, Leslie Adlam, Jeanne Beker, Tricia Black, Paul Braunstein, Georgie Murphy, Gord Rand, Kevin Whalen	Nominated	
Canadian Screen Awards	2026	Best Leading Performance in a Web Series	Settle Down	Won	
Canadian Screen Awards	2026	Best Writing in a Web Series	Settle Down: "Putting in the Work"	Nominated	
