= Settle Down (web series) =

Canadian comedy web series

Settle Down is a Canadian comedy web series, which premiered in 2025 on OutTV. The series stars Alexander Nunez as Mason, a successful LGBTQ matchmaker and host of a relationship advice podcast, who unexpectedly discovers that his own marriage to Jarod (Leighton Alexander Williams) is on the rocks, because Mason doesn't always practice in his own life the same principles he teaches to others.

The cast also includes Tymika Tafari, Izad Etemadi, Marco DeLuca, Clare McConnell, Matt Wells, Liam Melady, Thomas Gough, Josette Jorge, Angela Besharah, Colton Royce, Joshua Obra, Vasilios Filippakis, Scott Farley and Charlotte Cattell in supporting roles.

Created and written by Nunez and produced by Border 2 Border Entertainment, the series entered production in 2024. In September that year, OutTV confirmed its scheduling for winter 2025. The series premiered February 14, 2025, on OutTV and OutTV Go.

== Awards ==
Award	Date of ceremony	Category	Recipient(s)	Result	Ref.
SeriesFest	2025	Best Comedy Pilot		Won	
Canadian Screen Awards	2026	Best Lead Performance in a Web Program or Series	Alexander Nunez	Won	
Canadian Screen Awards	2026	Best Supporting Performance in a Web Program or Series	Nadine Bhabha	Nominated	
Canadian Screen Awards	2026	Best Supporting Performance in a Web Program or Series	Izad Etemadi	Nominated	
Canadian Screen Awards	2026	Best Supporting Performance in a Web Program or Series	Josette Jorge	Nominated	
Canadian Screen Awards	2026	Best Supporting Performance in a Web Program or Series	Tymika Tafari	Nominated	
Canadian Screen Awards	2026	Best Supporting Performance in a Web Program or Series	Leighton Alexander Williams	Nominated	
Canadian Screen Awards	2026	Best Picture Editing in a Web Program or Series	Anna Catley, "First-Date Jitters"	Nominated	
Canadian Screen Awards	2026	Best Picture Editing in a Web Program or Series	Arielle Skolnik, "I've Got Butterflies!"	Nominated	
Canadian Screen Awards	2026	Best Writing in a Web Program or Series	Alexander Nunez, "Putting in the Work"	Nominated	
