= TV1 (Canadian TV channel) =

Group of Canadian community television channels

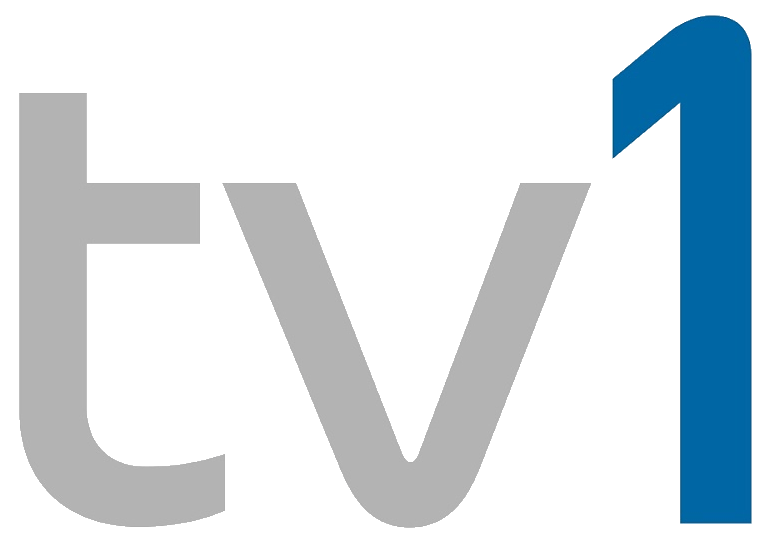
- Broadcast area: Montreal; Quebec City; Ottawa; Toronto; Atlantic Canada

Ownership
- Owner: Bell Canada

History
- Former names: Bell Local

TV1 (formerly Bell Local and Community One) is a group of community channels operated by Bell Canada's Fibe TV and FibreOP TV services and are exclusive to those services.

The service is primarily delivered via video on demand.

== History ==
Bell Local channels operated in four cities in Bell's Fibe TV service area; they were renamed TV1 on August 31, 2015.

Bell Aliant simultaneously operated a single Community One channel serving all of Atlantic Canada, prior to its full acquisition by (and integration into) Bell Canada in 2014. In 2015, Bell Aliant acquired broadcast rights to Atlantic University Sport for broadcast on Community One. Community One was also renamed TV1 in September 2015.

In 2019, as part of license renewals, the CRTC showed concerns over non-access programming tied to groups financially supported by Bell or starring personalities from local Bell Media radio and television stations. Bell defended the programs, arguing that they only constituted 5% of their output, were produced independently and "intimately tied to our various licence areas", and that they were designed to be associated with "popular" brands to attract viewership. As a result, Bell Media personalities or its content no longer appear on the platform.

== Programming ==
In recent years the channel has invested in some scripted comedy and drama programming by independent local producers in markets served by the channel, including the series Big League, Pink Is In, Vollies, King & Pawn, Sunshine City, Stittsville on Patrol, The Missus Downstairs, Everybody's Meg, Hey Halifax, Hello! Today!, 18 to 35, Cows Come Home, Trapped, and Geri Atrick 4 Mayor.

== List of channels ==
- Quebec City (French)
- Trois-Rivières (French)
- Joliette (French)
- Gatineau (French)
- Sherbrooke (French)
- Ottawa (French/English)
- Atlantic Canada (English/French)
- Hamilton and Niagara Region (English)
- London (English)
- Kitchener (English)
- Oshawa (English)
- Kingston (English)
- North Bay (English)
- Peterborough (English)
- Windsor (English)
- Brandon (English)
- Portage la Prairie (English)
- Selkirk (English)
- Winnipeg (English)

== See also ==
- Rogers TV
- TV Rogers
