= Katie Uhlmann =

- Born: Katherine Anita Uhlmann; September 1, 1987 (age 38); Trenton, Ontario, Canada
- Occupations: Actress, director, writer, interview host

Katie Uhlmann (born September 1, 1987) is a Canadian interview host, director, actress and writer, most noted for the web series My Roommate's an Escort and Cows Come Home.

Originally from Trenton, Ontario, she attended Queen's University, initially with the goal of becoming an optometrist, but switched to dramatic arts after her first year. Alongside her early career as an actress she launched the online talk show Katie Chats, with which she completed over 3,000 interviews with Canadian filmmakers and celebrities. In interviewing so many members of the Canadian entertainment community, her goal was to develop a resource for students of the Canadian entertainment community and industry, stating that she has set out to create the largest database of interviews with Canadian talent in the world.

In 2017, she wrote, directed and starred in the web series My Roommate’s an Escort. She later created Cows Come Home with Lindsey Middleton in 2025, which won the Canadian Screen Awards for Best Original Web Program or Series, Fiction and Best Direction in a Web Program or Series at the 14th Canadian Screen Awards in 2026.
