= Thin Walls =

2025 Canadian short film directed by Robert Armanyous

- Directed by: Robert Armanyous
- Written by: Robert Armanyous
- Produced by: Robert Armanyous; Dayyaan Jameel
- Starring: Lee Lawson; Jordan Dawson; Steven McCarthy
- Cinematography: Anders Nydam
- Edited by: Robert Armanyous
- Distributed by: La Distributrice de films
- Release date: 2025
- Running time: 23 minutes
- Country: Canada

Thin Walls is a Canadian short drama film, directed by Robert Armanyous and released in 2025. The film stars Lee Lawson and Jordan Dawson as Jean and Bobby, a sexually inhibited couple who are trying to work through their intimacy issues with each other despite the sound coming through the walls after Kurt (Steven McCarthy), a familiar figure from their past, moves into the apartment next door.

The film premiered at the 2025 Canadian Film Festival.

== Awards ==
Award	Date of ceremony	Category	Recipient	Result	Ref.
Canadian Screen Awards	2026	Best Live Action Short Drama	Robert Armanyous, Dayyaan Jameel	Nominated	
Canadian Screen Awards	2026	Best Performance in a Live Action Short Drama	Lee Lawson	Nominated	
