= Mr. Jane and Finch =

2019 film

- Directed by: Ngardy Conteh George
- Written by: Ngardy Conteh George; Alison Duke
- Produced by: Ngardy Conteh George; Alison Duke
- Starring: Winston LaRose
- Cinematography: Mark Vallino
- Edited by: Sonia Godding
- Music by: Orin Isaacs
- Production company: Oya Media Group
- Distributed by: Canadian Broadcasting Corporation
- Release date: February 17, 2019
- Running time: 44 minutes
- Country: Canada
- Language: English

Mr. Jane and Finch is a 2019 Canadian documentary film, directed by Ngardy Conteh George. The film is a portrait of Winston LaRose, a longtime community activist in Toronto's Jane and Finch neighbourhood whose campaign for a Toronto City Council seat in the 2018 Toronto municipal election was upended by Doug Ford's decision to slash the size of the city council in half mid-campaign.

The film received a preview screening at the Toronto Black Film Festival on February 17, 2019, before having its television premiere on CBC Television on February 22 as an episode of CBC Docs POV.

The film won two Canadian Screen Awards at the 8th Canadian Screen Awards in 2020, for Best Writing in a Documentary Program and the Donald Brittain Award.
