= Cows Come Home =

Canadian comedy web series

Cows Come Home is a Canadian comedy web series, which premiered in 2025 on Bell Fibe TV1. The series stars Lindsey Middleton as Tabby Acres, a young woman forced to move back home to her family's dairy farm in Fort Erie, Ontario, where she becomes drawn into the world of competitive cow showing.

The series was created by Middleton and Katie Uhlmann.

Following its success at the 14th Canadian Screen Awards, Fiasco Global Media announced plans to adapt it as a full half-hour television comedy series.

== Awards ==
Award	Date of ceremony	Category	Recipient(s)	Result	Ref(s)
Canadian Screen Awards	2026	Best Original Web Program or Series, Fiction	Katie Uhlmann, Lindsey Middleton, Hari Ramesh, David Carruthers, Keri Ferencz	Won	
Canadian Screen Awards	2026	Best Leading Performance in a Web Program or Series	Lindsey Middleton	Nominated	
Canadian Screen Awards	2026	Best Direction in a Web Program or Series	Katie Uhlmann, "The Teeth"	Won	
Canadian Screen Awards	2026	Best Writing in a Web Program or Series	Katie Uhlmann and Lindsey Middleton, "I Am Daisy Staplerton"	Nominated	
