= Izad Etemadi =

Canadian actor, writer and comedian

Izad Etemadi is a Canadian actor, writer and comedian. He is most noted for his supporting role as Ben in the web series Settle Down, for which he received a Canadian Screen Award nomination for Best Supporting Performance in a Web Series at the 14th Canadian Screen Awards in 2026.

Originally from Victoria, British Columbia, he is currently based in Toronto, Ontario.

In 2023 he starred as Phil in the short comedy film Plant Daddy, which premiered at the Inside Out Film and Video Festival after winning ACTRA's Queer Your Stories Short Film Competition. His other performances have included recurring roles in Orphan Black: Echoes and Overlord and the Underwoods, supporting roles in the films Shook and Mother Father Sister Brother Frank, and the web series Cyrus and Chels and Revenge of the Black Best Friend.

He has also been a producer, with credits including Cyrus and Chels, Plant Daddy and Lunar Sway.

He has also worked in theatre, including productions of Grow, Elf, Frozen, Come from Away, Mad Madge and The Bidding War.

His credits as a writer have included the stage play We Are Not the Others, as well as several solo comedy shows including Love with Leila and A Very Leila Christmas, in both of which he played a bearded lady, and Let Me Explain, a stand-up comedy show about his identity as a queer man of Iranian descent. In 2017 he was the winner of the Emerging Queer Artist Award from Buddies in Bad Times.
