= Hey Halifax, Hello! Today! =

Canadian television series

Hey Halifax, Hello! Today! is a Canadian sketch comedy television series, which premiered in 2025 on TV1. The series stars Taylor Olson and Bob Mann as Mick McDonald and Robbie Buck, the hosts of a local public-access television talk show in Halifax, Nova Scotia.

Guests appearing in the series include Jonathan Torrens, Robb Wells and Jeremie Saunders as themselves, and Jason Spurrell, Tumaini Sky Dusu, Sara Campbell, Katelyn McCulloch, Tieren Hawkins, Don Bottomley, Trina Corkum, Amelia Cornick, Morgan Melnyk and Koumbie as minor characters.

The series received two Canadian Screen Award nominations at the 14th Canadian Screen Awards in 2026, for Best Sketch Comedy Show and Ensemble Performance and Best Direction in a Variety or Sketch Comedy Program or Series (Adam DeViller, Taylor Olson).
