= Josette Jorge =

Canadian actress

Josette Jorge is a Canadian actress from Tsawwassen, British Columbia. She is most noted as a two-time Canadian Screen Award winner for Best Supporting Performance in a Children's or Youth Program or Series, winning at the 13th Canadian Screen Awards in 2025 for Ruby and the Well, and at the 14th Canadian Screen Awards in 2026 for The Unstoppable Jenny Garcia.

She also runs a drama training school, Ivy Speech Arts Academy, with her husband, actor Fane Tse.

In 2022 she played the dual role of the mother and the nanny in the world premiere of Ins Choi's stage play Bad Parent.

== Awards ==
Award	Date of ceremony	Category	Work	Result	Ref.
Canadian Screen Awards	2025	Best Supporting Performance in a Children's or Youth Program or Series	Ruby and the Well	Won	
Canadian Screen Awards	2025	Best Voice Performance	Open Season: Call of Nature	Nominated	
Canadian Screen Awards	2025	Best Writing in an Animated Program or Series	Galapagos X	Nominated	
Canadian Screen Awards	2026	Best Supporting Performance in a Children's or Youth Program or Series	The Unstoppable Jenny Garcia	Won	
Canadian Screen Awards	2026	Best Supporting Performance in a Web Program or Series	Settle Down	Nominated	
