= 18 to 35 =

Canadian comedy web series

- Created by: Rahul Chaturvedi; Charlie Whalley
- Starring: Natalia Gracious; Jean Yoon; Carlos Albornoz; Ali Hassan; Seán Cullen; Izaak Smith
- Composer: Scott Harwood
- Country of origin: Canada
- No. of seasons: 1
- No. of episodes: 6

Production
- Executive producers: Andrew Phung; Rahul Chaturvedi; Charlie Whalley; Luisa Alvarez Restrepo
- Cinematography: Allen Liu
- Editor: Carroll Chiramel

Original release
- Network: Bell Fibe TV1

18 to 35 is a Canadian comedy web series, which premiered in 2025 on Bell Fibe TV1. The series stars Natalia Gracious as Misha Patel, a Canadian woman who loses her high-powered job on Wall Street in New York City, and is forced to move back home to London, Ontario, to manage the youth hostel owned and operated by her parents, sparking chaos when her corporate management ideas clash with the hostel's customer base consisting almost entirely of people who mistakenly ended up in the Forest City after believing they were travelling to London, England.

The cast also includes Jean Yoon, Carlos Albornoz, Izaak Smith, Andrew Phung, Seán Cullen, Ali Hassan, Christian Smith, Sarah Cleveland, Bruce Novakowski, Jay Wong, Abigail Mortimore, Evan D. Adamson and Katie Ostojic in supporting roles.

The series was created by Charlie Whalley and Rahul Chaturvedi, after they won the pitch competition for web series at the 2023 Forest City Film Festival. It was shot in London in spring 2025.

It premiered on September 16, 2025.

== Awards ==
Award	Date of ceremony	Category	Recipient(s)	Result	Ref(s)
Canadian Screen Awards	2026	Best Original Web Program or Series, Fiction	Rahul Chaturvedi, Charlie Whalley, Luisa Alvarez Restrepo, Andrew Phung	Nominated	
Canadian Screen Awards	2026	Best Supporting Performance in a Web Program or Series	Jean Yoon	Won	
Canadian Screen Awards	2026	Best Direction in a Web Program or Series	Rahul Chaturvedi	Nominated	
Canadian Screen Awards	2026	Best Picture Editing in a Web Program or Series	Carroll Chiramel	Nominated	
Canadian Screen Awards	2026	Best Writing in a Web Program or Series	Rahul Chaturvedi, "London Calling"	Nominated	
WGC Screenwriting Awards	2026	Short Series	Kaveh Mohebbi, "Buck Mustang"	Won	
WGC Screenwriting Awards	2026	Short Series	Rahul Chaturvedi, "Bed Math and Beyond"	Nominated	
