= Who Killed the Montreal Expos? =

2025 Canadian documentary film by Jean-François Poisson

- Film poster
- French: Qui a tué les Expos de Montréal?
- Directed by: Jean-François Poisson
- Produced by: Stéphanie Thibault
- Cinematography: Hugo Généreux
- Music by: Philippe Brault
- Production company: Attraction Images
- Distributed by: Netflix
- Release date: October 9, 2025 (FNC)
- Running time: 90 minutes
- Country: Canada
- Languages: English; French

Who Killed the Montreal Expos? (French: Qui a tué les Expos de Montréal?) is a 2025 Canadian sports documentary film, directed by Jean-François Poisson. The film attempts to explore and uncover the reasons behind the 2004 demise of the Montreal Expos, a professional baseball team.

The film premiered on October 9, 2025, at the Festival du nouveau cinéma, before being released on Netflix on October 21.

== Reception ==
=== Critical response ===
On the review aggregator website Rotten Tomatoes, 100% of 11 critics' reviews are positive.

Robert Daniels of RogerEbert.com gave the film three and a half out of four stars and wrote, "While Who Killed the Montreal Expos? is light on the actual baseball, it doesn't forget the fans. The footage of the final Expos home game on September 29, 2004 leaves a lump in your throat. The images of fans and reporters crying sinks in your gut, making their still unbearable pain tangible."

=== Accolades ===
Award	Date of ceremony	Category	Recipient	Result	Ref.
Toronto Film Critics Association	2025	Rogers Best Canadian Documentary	Jean-François Poisson	Nominated	
Canadian Screen Awards	2026	Best History Documentary Program or Series	Marie-Christine Pouliot, Richard Speer, Stéphanie Thibault	Won	
Canadian Screen Awards	2026	Best Editorial Research	Sophie Charest, Nancy Audet	Won	
Canadian Screen Awards	2026	Best Visual Research	Shannon L'Hérault	Nominated	
Canadian Screen Awards	2026	Best Editing in a Documentary Program or Series	Guillaume Rodrigue	Nominated	
Canadian Screen Awards	2026	Best Direction in a Documentary Program	Jean-François Poisson	Nominated	
