= Bam Bam: The Sister Nancy Story =

- Directed by: Alison Duke
- Written by: Alison Duke
- Produced by: Ngardy Conteh George; Alison Duke
- Starring: Sister Nancy
- Cinematography: Lucas Joseph
- Edited by: Eugene Weis
- Music by: Orin Isaacs
- Production company: Oya Media Group
- Release date: June 2024 (Tribeca)
- Running time: 98 minutes
- Country: Canada
- Language: English

Bam Bam: The Sister Nancy Story is a Canadian documentary film, directed by Alison Duke and released in 2024. The film is a portrait of Sister Nancy, the pioneering Jamaican reggae musician who remains relatively unknown to 21st-century audiences even though her 1982 single "Bam Bam" is one of the most heavily sampled songs in contemporary music.

Figures appearing in the film to discuss Nancy's legacy include Janelle Monáe, Pete Rock and Main Source.

== Distribution ==
The film premiered at the Tribeca Film Festival in June 2024, before going into wider release in 2025, including a gala screening at the 2025 Trinidad and Tobago Film Festival.

In Canada, it had limited theatrical screenings in Toronto, but was distributed primarily as a television film on the linear and streaming Crave services.

== Awards ==
Association	Year	Category	Recipient	Result	Ref.
Canadian Screen Awards	2026	Best Biography or Arts Documentary Program or Series	Ngardy Conteh George, Alison Duke	Nominated	
Canadian Screen Awards	2026	Best Direction in a Documentary Program	Alison Duke	Won	
Canadian Screen Awards	2026	Best Writing in a Documentary	Alison Duke	Won	
Canadian Screen Awards	2026	Best Original Music in a Documentary	Orin Isaacs	Won	
Canadian Screen Awards	2026	Best Editorial Research	Jalana Lewis	Nominated	
Canadian Screen Awards	2026	Best Visual Research	Amy Fritz	Nominated	
Canadian Screen Awards	2026	Best Editing in a Documentary Program or Series	Eugene Weis	Won	
Canadian Screen Awards	2026	Best Sound in a Documentary or Factual Program or Series	Michelle Irving, Jordan Guy, Elma Bello, Derek Brin	Won	
