= Leighton Alexander Williams =

Canadian actor

Leighton Alexander Williams is a Canadian actor. He is most noted for his performance as Jarod in the web series Settle Down, for which he received a Canadian Screen Award nomination for Best Supporting Performance in a Web Series at the 14th Canadian Screen Awards in 2026.

Originally from Brampton, Ontario, he is an alumnus of York University, and is currently based in Toronto.

His other credits have included the films Bite of a Mango, Morningside and Dinner with Friends, the television series Murdoch Mysteries, and the web series Avocado Toast and Day Players.

He has also been an actor, director and playwright in Toronto theatre, most notably as the director and writer of Judas Noir, a Black-themed adaptation of The Last Days of Judas Iscariot for Obsidian Theatre Company. He also appeared in the cast in a small role as Satan, garnering a Dora Mavor Moore Award nomination for Outstanding Performance by an Ensemble, Independent Theatre in 2019.

He was also the writer of Residue, a 2017 short film directed by Shonna Foster. He has been the director of Umoja Corp., an episode of the 2021 web series 21 Black Futures, and the 2023 short film Queenie & Alpha.

He is queer.
