= Lana Longbeard =

Canadian animated television series

- Genre: Adventure-comedy
- Created by: Tony Mitchell; Andrew Power
- Developed by: Baljeet Rai
- Written by: Baljeet Rai; Alice Prodanou
- Directed by: Franz Kirchner; Solene Azernour; Romain Cislo
- Voices of: Liana Bdéwi; Dave McRae; Tamara Freeman; Jordan Stanley; Cameron MacLeod; Marybelle Sagard; Amanda Huxtable; Mark La Pointe
- Composers: Marc Tomasi; Anne-Sophie Versnaeyen
- Countries of origin: Canada; France
- Original language: English
- No. of seasons: 1
- No. of episodes: 52

Production
- Executive producers: Paul Rigg; David Sauerwein
- Producer: Janice Evans
- Running time: 11 minutes
- Production companies: Copernicus Studios; Zephyr Animation

Original release
- Network: CBC Gem/CBC Kids/Family Channel (Canada); Gulli/M6 (France)
- Release: December 20, 2024 – present

Lana Longbeard is an animated adventure-comedy television series by Tony Mitchell and Andrew Power. Zephyr Animation and Copernicus Studios produce the series. Show developer Baljeet Rai co-wrote the series with Alice Prodanou, and Franz Kirchner served as director. It began airing on CBC Gem on December 20, 2024 and the Family Channel on January 12, 2025, and it began airing on Cartoon Network in the British Isles on November 3, 2025, and on Cartoon Network in Europe, the Middle East and Africa on November 8, 2025. It also began streaming on HBO Max on November 10, 2025 exclusively in Europe.

== Plot ==
The story follows a 12-year-old girl named Lana Longbeard who sails the Ten Realms with her captain father and unique crew, pursuing her dream of becoming a great adventurer. But Lana must conquer some challenging obstacles: impulsivity, stubbornness, relentless curiosity, disdain for rules, and a love of pancakes.

== Characters ==
- Lana Longbeard (voiced by Liana Bdéwi) - A punky 12-year-old girl and adventurer who travels across the world with her dad on the Mighty Windbreaker.
- Andar Longbeard (voiced by Cameron MacLeod) - The captain of the Mighty Windbreaker and father of Lana.
- Boreas (voiced by Cody Alexander) - An Orc crew member of the Mighty Windbreaker and Lana's best friend.
- Helmet Hugo (voiced by Dave McRae) - When the crew faces a tough opponent, they launch Hugo—literally! A human cannonball with a helmet and a mysterious past, he’s their secret weapon.
- Greta (voiced by Tamara Freeman) - A barbarian with the soul of an artist, Greta does all the repairs and maintenance on the ship.
- Dr. Chopov (voiced by Jordan Stanley) - A purple cyclops who is part of the crew of the Mighty Windbreaker.
- Durango (voiced by Marybelle Sagard) - An independent explorer who loves quests and seeking thrills and Lana's idol.
- Nana Lovejoy (voiced by Amanda Huxtable) - Admiral Lovejoy's grandmother and former criminal.
- Baron Buckethead (voiced by Mark La Pointe) - Helmet Hugo's old companion and former enemy (briefly).

== Episodes ==
No. overall	No. in season	Title	Written by	Storyboard by	Original release date	Prod. code
1	1	"Quest for Your Life"	Baljeet Rai	Romain Rossard	December 20, 2024	TBA
Lana begins her hero's journey on her 12th birthday.
2	2	"Fruits of Terror"	Baljeet Rai	Jeff Barker	January 3, 2025	TBA
Bo and Lana explore a jungle together and find a plant which happens to talk.
3	3	"Oh Fishsticks!"	Baljeet Rai	Romain Rossard	January 3, 2025	TBA
Lana is given an ultimatum: complete a quest in 24 hours, or be booted from the guild of adventurers.
4	4	"Recipe for Disaster"	Laurie Elliot	Jeff Barker	January 3, 2025	TBA
In order to escape a deadly whirlpool, Lana is forced to fix a friendship and bake a cake.
5	5	"It Always Comes Back"	Steph Kaliner	Romain Cislo	January 3, 2025	TBA
Although Andar and Lana have similarities, they also have weapons each suited to them, whether a boomerang or hammer. They work through these differences together.
6	6	"Beard of Evil"	Alice Prodanou & Cedric Stephan	Romain Rossard	January 3, 2025	TBA
Lana deals with a haunted and evil pirate beard, on her face.
7	7	"Grifters Adrift"	Ashley Mendoza	Ian Freedman	January 3, 2025	TBA
Before their ship is inspected, Lana and Bo accidentally cause damage to the ship, leading to many problems.
8	8	"The Zingalinger"	Henry Gifford	Mathilde Prevost	January 3, 2025	TBA
In order to become more "cool", Lana asks her friend, Chopov, to tell her the right way to "roast" people.
9	9	"Flap Shack Attack"	Stephanie Kaliner	Adriana Blake	January 3, 2025	TBA
The crew is pushed into a dangerous situation after Lana gets obsessed with her toy collection.
10	10	"Don't Lose Your Head"	Terry McGurrin	Jose Pou	January 3, 2025	TBA
When the Mighty Windbreaker gets a cursed figurehead, Lana struggles to finish the quest.
11	11	"Four Wrongs Make a Right"	Ben Joseph	Adriana Blake	January 3, 2025	TBA
Hoping to get her dad out of a bad funk, Lana begins a quest she made up. In the process, she accidentally summons evil spirits.
12	12	"The Sea-Grass is Always Greener"	Steph Kaliner	Olivier Guillaume	January 3, 2025	TBA
Lana accidentally switches bodies with her arch-nemesis, Horatius, when her wish causes the incorrect result.
13	13	"The Can of Worm"	Anastasia Heinzl	Olivier Guillaume	January 3, 2025	TBA
Lana leads the crew to the Lost Isle of the Titans.
14	14	"The Legend of Andar"	Alice Boucherit & Cedric Stephan	Benjamin Culoy	January 10, 2025	TBA
Lana discovers her dad never defeated the monster that made him a legend.
15	15	"It Takes Two to Durango Tango"	Lienne Sawatsky	Adriana Blake	January 17, 2025	TBA
Lana comes across the person she considers her hero: Durango.
16	16	"Don't Rock the Dinghy"	Alex Ganetakos	Jose Pou	January 24, 2025	TBA
In an attempt to move up the leaderboard, Bo and Lana take on a quest which ends up being more dangerous than they anticipated.
17	17	"Battle of the Blargs"	Ashley Mendoza	Mathilde Prevost	January 31, 2025	TBA
Lana learns that her animal companion, Sprog, has both a mysterious and dangerous side.
18	18	"A Wrinkle in Crime"	Terry McGurrin	Jose Pou	February 7, 2025	TBA
An elderly woman is helped by Lana, but learns a dark truth about her.
19	19	"Bash From the Past"	Ben Joseph	Romain Rossard	February 14, 2025	TBA
It's revealed that Greta once was part of a rock band.
20	20	"Father Knows Quest"	Emer Connon	Mathilde Prevost	February 21, 2025	TBA
Lana decides to become the daughter of Sorlak for "a day" since she detests the rules Andar layed out for her.
21	21	"Dressed to Quest"	Ashley Mendoza	Olivier Guillaume	February 28, 2025	TBA
In an act of resistance against her dad, Lana dyes her hair blue and decides to lead the crew.
22	22	"Going Bozork"	Ben Joseph	Benjamin Culoy	March 7, 2025	TBA
Bo has to become a heroic orc so the crew can be saved.
23	23	"Five Star Fury"	Lienne Sawatsky	Adriana Blake	March 14, 2025	TBA
Lana decides to show off to a journalist by fixing up the Mighty Windbreaker.
24	24	"Prophecy of Doom"	Anastasia Heinzl	Romain Rossard	March 21, 2025	TBA
Lana is said to bring bad luck to those she loves by an oracle.
25	25	"Catch That Flying Fish"	Baljeet Rai	Mathilde Prevost	March 28, 2025	TBA
The crew works to stop a messenger, in the form of a flying fish, so that the Admiral doesn't receive a message.
26	26	"Undercover Captain"	Emer Connon	Jose Pou	April 4, 2025	TBA
After Captain Andar gets a negative review on his performance, Lana attempts to help him.
27	27	"Going Overboard"	Alex Ganetakos	Adriana Blake	April 11, 2025	TBA
The dangers of having Dr. Chopov as a guardian are revealed to Lana.
28	28	"Tale of the Wolf Mom"	Ashley Mendoza	Olivier Guillaume	April 18, 2025	TBA
Lana begins adventuring with her mom, a shapeshifting wolf named Ostana.
29	29	"Dice of Destiny"	Alice Boucherit & Cedric Stephan	Olivier Guillaume	April 25, 2025	TBA
Lana finds a magic dice, and creates a reality that's perfect but quickly becomes a nightmare.
30	30	"A Hardwired Holiday"	Ben Joseph	Jose Pou	May 2, 2025	TBA
Lana and STONK switch boats for a Guild exchange program.
31	31	"Escape from Escape Island"	Laurie Elliot	Mathilde Prevost	May 9, 2025	TBA
Lana and Horatius must work together if they are going to escape from Escape Island.
32	32	"Lana the Something Super Great and Totally Awesome"	Emer Connon	Adriana Blake	July 4, 2025	TBA
Lana must go through a naming ceremony with Grammy Longbeard on Ched-iyaq.
33	33	"Baron Buckethead"	Henry Gifford	Benjamin Culot	July 11, 2025	TBA
Lana stands by Helmet Hugo when he is challenged to a duel by a powerful knight.
34	34	"Fan Friction"	Madeliene Patton	Derek Jessome	July 18, 2025	TBA
Lana babysits Admiral Lovejoy's starstruck niece, Avery who is Lana's biggest fan!
35	35	"War and Pizza"	Anastasia Heinzl	Olivier Guillaume	July 25, 2025	TBA
Lana and Bo turn against each other and escalate a villagers' bickering into a pizza war!
36	36	"Bo Diggity"	Lisa Gaultier	Bianca Ansems	August 1, 2025	TBA
Lana handles Horatius, whose palace is about to collapse while Bo handles his orc parents.
37	37	"Throw a Beard a Bone"	Ben Joseph	Adriana Blake	August 8, 2025	TBA
Lana teams up with Saltybeard’s beard to save Andar, but has this villain reformed?
38	38	"The Mighty Wind Broken"	Corey Glover	Peter Huggan	November 28, 2025	TBA
Lana and Andar decide to take a faster route over land to win a race.
39	39	"Junk Imp and the Trash Kid"	Henry Gifford	Derek Jessome	November 28, 2025	TBA
Lana and Junk Imp lose their memories and become sketchy business partners.
40	40	"Trixie Trinket & Smilecrusher"	Alice Prodanou & Cedric Stephan	Mathilde Prevost	November 28, 2025	TBA
Lana and Andar go on a quest to Trixie Trinket’s Treasure Trove; a mega mall for heroes.
41	41	"Fear Island"	Henry Gifford	Bianca Ansems	November 28, 2025	TBA
Lana and the crew of the Mighty Windbreaker must spend a night on Fear Island.
42	42	"On the Rocks"	Madeliene Patton	Mathilde Prevost	November 28, 2025	TBA
The crew of the Mighty Windbreaker are pitted against each other by a weird talking rock.
43	43	"Doomscrolling"	Lisa Gaultier	Olivier Guillaume	November 28, 2025	TBA
Lana must trust her nemesis Horatius with a vital secret.
44	44	"A Pearl of Wisdom"	Ben Joseph	Derek Jessome	November 28, 2025	TBA
Lana embarks on a perilous journey to return the stolen Pearl of Wisdom.
45	45	"A Haunting, Ahoy"	Alice Prodanou	Adriana Blake	November 28, 2025	TBA
Lana helps a ghost girl, Millie, complete her Kick the Bucket List.
46	46	"Best in Quest"	Ashley Mendoza	Bianca Ansems	November 28, 2025	TBA
Lana and STONK tie for the 'best newcomer' Guild Award and must compete head-to-head.
47	47	"The Tides of Time"	Alice Prodanou	Adriana Blake	November 28, 2025	TBA
Lana and Boreas find themselves transported back in time.
48	48	"The Dark Side of the Pancake"	Alice Prodanou & Cedric Stephan	Mathilde Prevost	November 28, 2025	TBA
After ordering the expensive fancy Flap Shack pancake, Lana delivers pancakes to pay off her debt.
49	49	"Side Kickin' It"	Alice Prodanou	Derek Jessome	November 28, 2025	TBA
Boreas and Lana argue over who's the hero and who's the sidekick in their relationship.
50	50	"Chop Chop, Let's Rock"	Henry Gifford	Bianca Ansems	November 28, 2025	TBA
Lana volunteers Dr. Chopov to lead a small army of Clopses against the dreaded Mangetout.
51	51	"Reset of the Realms"	Baljeet Rai	Olivier Guillaume	November 28, 2025	TBA
The Titans resume their Game of Fates and Lana finds reality shifting around her.
52	52	"Lana Takes on the Titans"	Baljeet Rai	Olivier Guillaume	November 28, 2025	TBA
Lana spreads a message of resistance to the Realms for a final showdown with the Titans.

== Production and release ==
In February 2014, Tony Mitchell began working on the series, as he noted in a social media post. It was later reported that he, along with Andrew Power and Dylan Edward, originally created the series, with all of them working at Copernicus Studios at the time.

In June 2021, it was announced that Zephyr Animation, the APC Kids production arm and part of APC Studios, had secured a co-development deal with Super RTL in Germany, with both companies said to co-develop the series, which was said to be aimed at kids age six to nine. At the time, Jessica Borutski was directing the series, while David Sauerwein and Paul Rigg, of Zephyr Animation and Copernicus Studios, were executive producing it. However, it was later stated that the show would be directed by Franz Kirchner and developed by Baljeet Rai.

In September 2022, Animation Magazine reported that Zephyr Animation was completing the financing for the series, their first 2D animated series, co-produced with Copernicus Studios, that production would begin before 2022 had ended, and that initial broadcast deals were being finalized. Previously, it had been stated that the series would begin production in 2021. Later, at the Annecy International Animation Film Festival, in June 2023, APC Kids stated that production had recently begun.

In June 2023, it was announced that Zephyr Animation had secured its first pre-sales for the series by Warner Bros. Discovery in EMEA, Super RTL in Germany, Gulli in France, and CBC in Canada, while APC Kids continued to hold "worldwide distribution rights" for the series. Paul Rigg was also described as a series executive producer at the time.

In April 2024, the series was noted as benefiting from the CMF-Shaw Rocket Fund, which supported animated series. The series received funding from the Shaw Rocket Fund in 2021. In October 2024, the TV Kids 2024/2025 Guide was released by World Screen, in which APC Kids Managing Director Lionel Marty said they were "excited to launch" the series at MIPCOM and MIPJunior. It was also stated that the series would have 52 episodes, each of which are 11 minutes long.

Originally the series was scheduled to be released in 2023, but that did not happen. The series began airing on CBC Gem on December 20, 2024 and the Family Channel on January 12, 2025. The series is also streaming on CBC Kids' YouTube channel. The series is also scheduled to air on RTL Super, Gulli, and an unnamed platform owned by Warner Bros. Discovery, on a date that has not been announced, sometime in the second financial quarter of 2025.

The series received a companion PC video game entitled Lana Longbeard and the Golden Stacks, with a demo phase beginning at the end of January 2025.
