= Samora Smallwood =

Canadian television actress

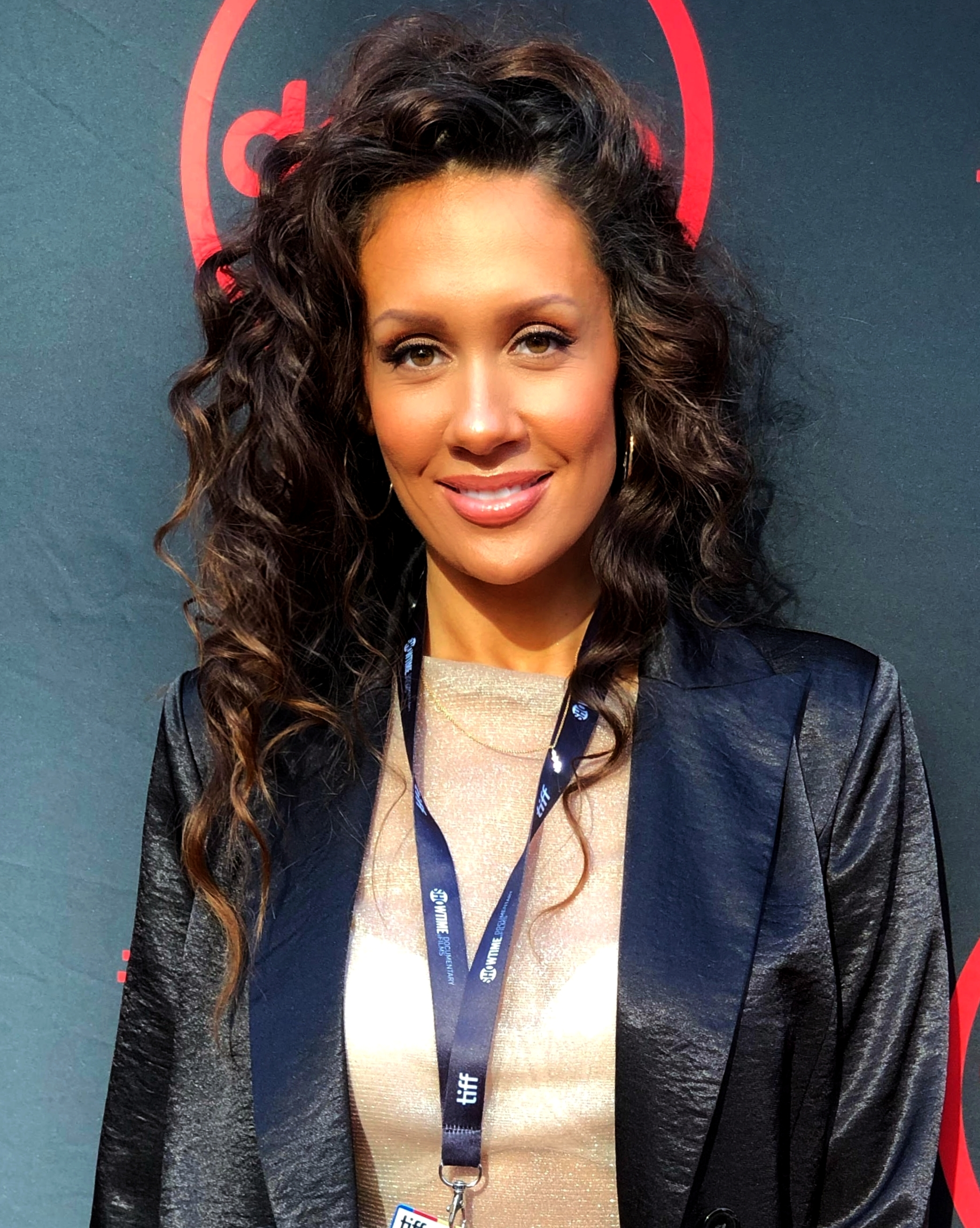
- Smallwood in 2019
- Occupations: Actress; writer
- Years active: 2010–present
- Website: https://www.samorasmallwood.com/

Samora Smallwood is a Canadian actress and writer from Windsor, Ontario and Newfoundland. Samora won a Canadian Screen Award at the 10th Canadian Screen Awards in 2022 for her performance in the Lifetime television film Death She Wrote (2021).

== Early life ==
She attended the University of Windsor in the early 2000s, and graduated in 2008 with a general Bachelor of Arts.

== Career ==
On television, Samora has appeared on Designated Survivor, The Expanse, Star Trek: Discovery and Murdoch Mysteries. She also had a recurring roles on Hallmark Channel fantasy series Good Witch in 2021, and Oprah Winfrey Network prime time soap opera The Kings of Napa in 2022.

In 2023 she began appearing in a recurring role as Monica Hill in the Hallmark Channel drama series, The Way Home.

In 2024, she appeared in two episodes in a minor role in the Apple TV+ miniseries, The Big Cigar, and later was cast as one of the supporting characters in the Bell Fibe TV drama series, Disrepair.

In 2026, Smallwood self-nominated her webseries Coming Home for four Canadian Screen Awards, but she ultimately did not win in any of the categories.

Smallwood was also called out on social media by several industry professionals for her negative gossip-mongering behind the scenes about other productions she worked on.

== Accolades ==
In 2022, Smallwood won the Canadian Screen Award for Best Lead Actress in a Television Film or Miniseries at the 10th Canadian Screen Awards in 2022 for her performance in the Lifetime television film Death She Wrote (2021).

== Filmography ==
=== Film ===
Year	Title	Role	Notes
2013	Club Utopia	Felicia	
2014	Tormented	Roberta	
2015	I Wish You Love	Bobby	
2019	Queen of the Morning Calm	Sarah	

=== Television ===
Year	Title	Role	Notes
2013	Karma's A B*tch	Maria	Episode: "Stolen Lives"
2013	Murder in Paradise	Namia	Episode: "French Kiss of Death"
2014	Teenagers	Mrs. Diaz	2 episodes
2017	Designated Survivor	Radar Officer	Episode: "Two Ships"
2018	The Shelter	Erin	4 episodes
2018	The Expanse	UN Naval Attache	2 episodes
2018	Shadowhunters	Uniformed Officer	Episode: "Erchomai"
2018	Frankie Drake Mysteries	Ruth	Episode: "Dressed to Kill"
2019	Hudson & Rex	Lizzie Westbrook	Episode: "Fearless Freaks"
2019	Star Trek: Discovery	Lt. Amin	2 episodes
2019	American Gods	FBI Agent #2	Episode: "Moon Shadow"
2019	Tokens	Jenn the Costumer	Episode: "Finding Cinderella"
2019	Star Trek: Short Treks	Lt. Amin	Episode: "Q&A"
2019, 2021	Coroner	Shelley / Lisa Grigson	2 episodes
2020	Remember Me, Mommy?	Marie Cummings	Television film
2020	A Christmas Break	Judy Cole	Television film
2021	Good Witch	Dr. Monica McBride	4 episodes
2021	Death She Wrote	Lila DeMarco	Television film
2021	Murdoch Mysteries	Viola Treatly	Episode: "Love or Money"
2021	Angel Falls Christmas	Dr. Dawn Jackson	Television film
2022	The Kings of Napa	Dr. Maddi Brewer	4 episodes
2023–present	The Way Home	Monica Hill	Recurring role
2025	Disrepair	Erica Thomas	Miniseries
2025	Coming Home	Sammy Smalls	Miniseries
