= Anna Catley =

Canadian film editor

Anna Catley is a Canadian film editor. She is most noted as a dual Canadian Screen Award nominee for Best Editing at the 13th Canadian Screen Awards in 2025, receiving nods for her work on the films Paying for It and We Forgot to Break Up.

Her other credits have included the films Things I Do for Money, Thriving: A Dissociated Reverie and Sea Star, and the web series Settle Down and Avocado Toast.
