= 50,000 First Dates =

2025 documentary series

50,000 First Dates: A True Story is a 2025 documentary series that follows the real-life experiences of Nesh Pillay, a survivor of traumatic brain injury with severe short-term memory loss. The series follows Pillay's journey after suddenly awakening in 2022 with no memory of her daughter Zenaid or, husband JJ Jakope, who she mistakes for her Uber driver.

The series is produced by William Talmadge, Brent Hodge and Carrie Mudd. The series premiered on February 11, 2025, and is available on Amazon Prime.
