= Sounds Black =

Canadian documentary television series

Sounds Black is a Canadian documentary television series about Black Canadian music, which premiered in 2025 on History Channel.

The series is co-produced by Corus Entertainment, Circle Blue Entertainment and Freddie Films, and directed by Cazhhmere Downey. Figures appearing in the series include Kardinal Offishall, Jully Black, Fefe Dobson, Maestro Fresh Wes, Deborah Cox and Keshia Chanté.

== Episodes ==
No.	Title	Directed by	Written by	Original release date
1	"The Seeds"	Cazhhmere Downey	Cazhhmere Downey	February 2, 2025
The early roots of Black music in Canada, from the days of the Underground Railroad to the emergence of Caribbean music in Canada in the 1960s.
2	"Pay Me"	Cazhhmere Downey	Cazhhmere Downey	February 1, 2025
The systemic barriers faced by Black musicians in the recording industry.
3	"Women of the Music"	Cazhhmere Downey	Cazhhmere Downey	February 8, 2025
The journey of Black women in Canadian music.
4	"The Takeover"	Cazhhmere Downey	Cazhhmere Downey	February 8, 2025
The current state of Black music in Canada.
