= Lindsey Middleton =

Canadian actress (born 1991)

- Born: March 6, 1991 (age 35); Ridgeway, Ontario, Canada
- Occupation: Actress
- Years active: 2010–present

Lindsey Middleton (born March 6, 1991) is a Canadian actress. She is known for her role in the web series Out With Dad and its subsequent spin-off series Vanessa's Story and Counselling Vanessa.

== Career ==
Middleton starred on Out With Dad for several seasons, from 2010 to 2017. For her role in Out With Dad (and its spin-offs Vanessa's Story and Counselling Vanessa), she has received various awards and nominations, including an IAWTV Award for Best Lead Actress – Drama in 2015.

In 2017, for her performance in Counselling Vanessa, Middleton received a Canadian Screen Award nomination for Best Performance by an Actress in a Program of Series Produced for Digital Media.

Middleton and Katie Uhlmann co-created the 2025 web series Cows Come Home.
