= The Missus Downstairs =

Canadian comedy web series

The Missus Downstairs is a Canadian comedy web series, which premiered in 2021 on Bell Fibe's TV1. The series stars Dave Sullivan as John, a shy loner whose complicated relationship with his chatty downstairs neighbour (Mary Walsh) evolves into an unlikely friendship.

Sullivan created the series based on his own real-life relationship with Elsie Higgins, a woman who lived downstairs from him after he moved into a new residence in Portugal Cove–St. Philip's, Newfoundland and Labrador, during the COVID-19 pandemic.

The cast also includes Renée Hackett, Andy Jones, Darryl Hopkins, Phil Churchill, Ruth Lawrence, Wendi Smallwood and Justin Simms.

Walsh received a Canadian Screen Award nomination for Best Lead Performance in a Web Program or Series at the 12th Canadian Screen Awards in 2024.
