= Michael Charles =

Australian blues musician

I, the copyright holder of this work, hereby publish it under the following license:

Michael Charles (born 23 February 1956) is an Australian blues musician, songwriter, guitarist, and singer. He is an inductee into the Chicago Blues Hall of Fame.

== Early life and education ==
Charles was born in Australia. His father was a music hobbyist and taught his son his first chords. At nine years old, Charles formed a band and put on his first live paid performance. In 1970, he traveled with older musicians performing shows, corporate gigs, and weddings.

== Career ==
In 1972, Charles formed the band Black Venom. They performed live on television. In the early 1980s Charles joined the band Magnum and they released "Bring Back Your Love” – “Coming Back Home” released on the Magnetic Label and produced by Sam Gervasi.

In 1983, Charles released his first solo recording “I’m A Puppet”. In 1984, he met record producer Greg Williams of Dex Audio of Australia and Charles produced several releases. Charles performs on Dex Audio's record label Newmarket Music in Australia, and Greg Williams continues to produce and master Charles’ recordings.

In 1985, Charles formed an independent record label, Moonlight Label. From 1986 through 1989, Charles and Salik Silverstein of SOS Silver Spoon Productions produced three videos which aired on Australia’s Night Shift, Rage, and MTV. In 1987 and 1988 he traveled about Australia on a promotional tour.

In 1990, Charles traveled to the USA to perform at Buddy Guy's Legends in Chicago, Illinois. From 1990 to 1995, he traveled several times to America, performing with Buddy Guy, Eddy Clearwater, George Baze, Junior Wells, James Cotton, Phil Guy. In 1991 Jerry Bryant of JBTV in Chicago Illinois featured Charles on JBTV's blues show, Blues Oasis. In 1993 he released his first solo album. (In late of 2006 Jerry Bryant of JBTV and Charles reunited to start a DVD project which continued on into 2007).

In 1995, Charles toured with blues musician Jimmy Dawkins, and was signed by producer Jack Mehl to his record label, Moonlight Records; a year later Moonlight released "My Shadow", Charles's first CD in the U.S. Charles joined NARAS, the Grammy Award Association where he also entertained monthly for two years at the Chicago Chapter. In 2005 he was the recipient of an award from the Grammy Award Association and NARAS commemorating his ten year anniversary.

In 1996, Charles built a recording studio in America. In 1997 he performed at the Crossroads Festival in Memphis Tennessee as the guest of Sam Phillips. Beginning in 1990, Charles appeared on DJ John Gorny's Blue Midnight show on WPNA radio, Chicago, Illinois many times through the years. In 1997 Charles appeared for the first of six appearances on WGN-TV. He built a second recording studio in America.

During the next ten years Charles performances included the Chicago Blues Festival, New Orleans Jazz and Blues Festival, Philadelphia Blues Fest, Memphis Tennessee Crossroads Conference, New Orleans Cutting Edge Conference. In 1999 Charles moved to Nashville for 18 months and was featured in Nashville's "Rock and Read". In 2000 Charles moved to Chicago and built a third recording studio. His fourth and latest studio was built in 2003 and was called Sammary Studio.

Charles traveled around North America on a number of musical tours. He gave each a name, including the "Full Circle" tour in 2008, the "Another Time Another Place" Tour in 2010, the "Connected" tour in 2011, the "Road Dawg" tour in 2012, the "Undercover Tour" in 2013, the "Three Hundred Sixty Tour" in 2014 (including a performance at the Chicago Blues Festival), and the "RIFF Tour" in 2015.

In October 2015, Charles was inducted into Chicago Blues Hall of Fame. At that time he had recorded about 34 albums of blues rock music.

In 2018 as Charles travelled his from A to Z tour. Salik Silverstein, a film producer from Australia, released the documentary on the life and musical career of Charles, All I Really Know from A to Z. The DVD was released in 2019. Soundtracked, the CD soundtrack to the documentary was also released in 2019. In 2020 the Moonlight record label released The Early Years, a CD of the complete singles released between 1984 and 1988 by Charles in Australia before he moved to the United States in 1990. Also, in 2020, 19, the downloadable album of all the Alone and Acoustic songs recorded during the pandemic became available. In 2021 a double CD and DVD Box set chronologizing the entire pandemic experience from the recording studio was released making the total of Charles' releases number 38. This release was partially funded by the Illinois Arts Council Association. 2022 saw the singles of "Key To The Highway" and Charles' new original song "Silenced", released. In 2023 Charles version of "Wichita Lineman" was added to his discography. In 2025 Charles released “Try Another Key [40th Anniversary]” which settled the long-time aspiration for Michael Charles to “correct” and address his dissatisfaction with the recordings on his 1985 debut solo release “Try Another Key”. Although, through the years, most of the songs were re-recorded and released on other albums, “Try Another Key [40th Anniversary]” finally fulfills the self-desire for a complete and satisfying album.

Charles is traveling his 19th consecutive international tour "Where To Next 2026, which will once again take him to the U.S., Canada, and Australia.

== Discography ==
=== Singles ===
- "Coming Back Hone / Bring Back Your Love 45rpm Magnetic Entertainment
- "I'm A Puppet" 1984 Quasi Productions 45 rpm
- "Time Just Keeps Calling" 1986 Moonlight Label 45 rpm
- "Imaginations And Mind Games" 1987 Moonlight Label 45 rpm
- "Long Way To Go" 1987 Moonlight Label 45 rpm
- "She's My Woman" 1987 Moonlight Label 45 rpm
- "Without Your Love (For Company)" 1986 Moonlight Label 45 rpm 12-inch
- "Crawling on the Floor" 1996 Moonlight Label CD
- "Simple Day" Living 2000 Moonlight Label CD
- "Simple Day" Living Limited Edition 2000 CD
- "MC Shuffle" 2002 Moonlight Label CD
- "Come’ Melodia" 2002 Moonlight Label CD
- "Connected (For the Radio)" 2010 Moonlight Label CD
- "After Midnight" 2011 Moonlight Label / Newmarket Music CD
- "Going Down" 2012 Moonlight Label / Newmarket Music CD
- "Crosscut Saw" 2013 Moonlight Label / Newmarket Music CD
- "Hey Joe" 2013 Moonlight Label / Newmarket Music CD
- "Cover Tunes" 2013 MoonlightLabel /Newmarket Music CD
- "Why Am I Here?" 2015 Moonlight Label CD
- "Long Way To Go" [Live] 2015 Moonlight Label Download
- "Coming Back Home" 2016 Moonlight Label Download
- "All I Really Know" 2018 Moonlight Label Download
- "Key To The Highway" 2021 Moonlight Label Download

=== Albums ===
- Try Another Key YPRX2237 1985 Quasi Productions Vinyl
- Home Through The Streets 1986 Moonlight Label Vinyl, Cassette, 2008 CD
- The Wind 1989 Moonlight Label Vinyl, cassette, 1998 CD
- My Shadow 1996 Moonlight Records cassette, CD
- Hard Days & Long Nights 1990 Moonlight Label CD
- Keep Walking 1999 Moonlight Label CD
- Recall MLL-008 2004 Moonlight Label CD
- I’m Nobody’s Fool 2006 Moonlight Label 2008 Newmarket Music
- Connected 2010 MLL-010 Moonlight Label CD
- Michael Charles Three Hundred Sixty 2014 CD
- Concert at the Nest 2015 Moonlight Label CD
- Sandstone 2017 Moonlight Label CD
- Soundtracked 2019 Moonlight Label CD
- The Early Years 2020 Moonlight Label CD
- 19 2020 Moonlight Label Download
- 19+ 2021 Moonlight Label CD / DVD Box set

=== DVD ===
- Michael Charles Live at JBTV Live TV 2006-2007 DVD
- All I Really Know From A to Z 2018 DVD
