= Ngardy Conteh George =

Sierra Leonean-Canadian film director

- Born: Ngardy Conteh; Freetown, Sierra Leone
- Education: University of New Orleans
- Occupations: Film director, film producer, editor
- Years active: 2004-present
- Spouse: Philman George
- Children: 2

Ngardy Conteh George is a Sierra Leonean-Canadian film director, editor and producer.

== Early life ==
Ngardy Conteh George was born in Freetown, Sierra Leone, and is the youngest of four children. Early in her childhood, her family moved to Toronto, Ontario.

== Track and field ==
Conteh George attended the University of New Orleans (1997–2001) on a track and field scholarship, where she competed in triple jump and high jump competitions. Conteh George placed 3rd in high jump at the 1998 Sunbelt Indoor Conference Championship. In 2001, Sun Belt Conference announced that Ngardy Conteh was part of the 2000–2001 commissioners list and Academic Honor Roll. The commissioners list is a compilation of student athletes who maintained at least a 3.5 grade point average for the previous two semesters or three quarters.

== Film career ==
After graduating, Conteh George turned her focus towards film production and telling the stories of the African diaspora. Her first film was Soldiers for the Streets (made as part of the Momentum program with the NFB in 2004) which detailed the Ras King’s efforts to educate and empower youth.) In 2005, Conteh George was the production manager of the documentary series Literature Alive, created by Frances Ann Solomon. She directed three episodes and co-directed one of them.

With her company Mattru Media, Conteh George produced, directed and edited many projects for broadcast and corporate clients. Productions included The Rhyming Chef Barbuda, a cooking show fusing culinary with hip hop starring her now husband Philman George. She produced two seasons of the documentary style magazine hip-hop culture show Cypher for AUX TV, the half-hour documentary The Circle of Slavery, which premiered at the Sierra Leone International Film Festival 2012, and the feature-length documentary The Flying Stars (formerly named Leone Stars).

=== The Flying Stars ===
The Flying Stars (formerly Leone Stars) is directed and produced by Conteh George and Allan Tong with the other producer being Katarina Soukup of Catbird Productions. The project raised 20 thousand dollars on kickstarter and was the first documentary to ever win the Telefilm Canada TIFF Pitch This! contest. After this success, the film received funding from the Sundance Institute Documentary Film Fund. In the spring of 2012 the film was selected for the Hot Docs Forum. The film had its world premiere at RIDM and went on to play at several other film festivals, including Toronto Black Film Festival, Wilson Oakville Film Festival, and Black Star International Film Festival.

The festival run ended with the Best documentary award at the 2015 BronzeLens Film Festival and was broadcast around the world, including the Documentary Channel in Canada, NHK in Japan, DR in Denmark and Al Jazeera.

=== OYA Media Group ===
In 2016, Conteh George directed and edited the short documentary Dudley Speaks For Me as part of the Akua Benjamin Legacy Project series executive produced by Alison Duke. It received the Best Canadian Presentation at the Caribbean Tales international Film Festival. The two women formed a synergy based on intersecting values and formed the production company OYA Media Group.

OYA Media Group’s first production was Mr. Jane and Finch, directed by Conteh George. The documentary was commissioned by CBC Doc POV and revolves around Winston Larose, a beloved 80-year-old Guyanese-Canadian activist who throws his hat into local politics and is met with unflinching systemic racism in the Canadian political system. The film was nominated for a Golden Sheaf Award and received two Canadian Screen Awards at the 8th Canadian Screen Awards in 2020: the Donald Brittain Award for Best Social/Political Documentary and Best Writing for a Documentary.

Founded by Duke, the two women also lead the OYA Emerging Filmmaker program (formally Black Youth Pathway to Industry) for young Black graduates of film and television degree programs.

In 2024 she received a Canadian Screen Award nomination for Best Direction in a Documentary or Factual Series at the 12th Canadian Screen Awards, for her work on the television series Black Community Mixtapes.

== Partial filmography ==
- Soldiers for the Streets (2004)
- Literature Alive (2005)
- The Circle of Slavery (2008)
- The Rhyming Chef Barbuda (2009)
- The Flying Stars (2014)
- Dudley Speaks for Me (2016)
- Mr. Jane and Finch (2019)
- A Mother Apart (2024)
- Bam Bam: The Sister Nancy Story (2024)
