= Canadian Screen Award for Best Ensemble Performance in a Variety or Sketch Comedy Program or Series =

Annual Canadian television award

The Canadian Screen Award for Best Ensemble Performance in a Variety or Sketch Comedy Program or Series is an award category, presented by the Academy of Canadian Cinema and Television to honour ensemble performance in sketch comedy or variety entertainment programs.

Beginning with the 6th Gemini Awards in 1992, the academy introduced a single award for Best Performance in a Comedy Program or Series, whose winners or nominees could be either an individual or an ensemble; separate awards for Best Individual Performance in a Comedy Program or Series and Best Ensemble Performance in a Comedy Program or Series, which blended both sketch comedy ensembles and scripted sitcom casts, were introduced for the 16th Gemini Awards in 2001.

The ensemble category was discontinued when the Gemini Awards transitioned into the Canadian Screen Awards in 2013; with the 4th Canadian Screen Awards in 2016, however, a new category was reintroduced for Individual or Ensemble Performance in a Variety or Sketch Comedy Program or Series. In 2019 and 2020 the category was effectively merged with the category for Best Sketch Comedy Show, with the cast and the producers all honoured together as nominees or winners, but the ensemble performance category was spun back off again in 2021.

The Academy has since reintroduced the Comedy Ensemble category to honour situation comedy casts, separately from the category for sketch comedy ensembles.

The category was eliminated in 2025, ahead of the 14th Canadian Screen Awards, and was instead merged back into Best Sketch Comedy Show as in 2019 and 2020.

== Winners and nominees ==
Year	Actors	Series	Ref
2016; 4th Canadian Screen Awards
2016; 4th Canadian Screen Awards	Kathleen Phillips, Pat Thornton, Patrice Goodman, Kevin Vidal, Alice Moran, Rob Norman, Norm Macdonald	Sunnyside	
2016; 4th Canadian Screen Awards	Cathy Jones, Shaun Majumder, Mark Critch, Susan Kent	This Hour Has 22 Minutes	
2016; 4th Canadian Screen Awards	Kayla Lorette, Marty Adams, Caitlin Howden, Tim Baltz, Sam Richardson, Steve Waltien	The Second City Project	
2016; 4th Canadian Screen Awards	Rick Mercer	Rick Mercer Report	
2017; 5th Canadian Screen Awards
2017; 5th Canadian Screen Awards	Gord Downie, Rob Baker, Johnny Fay, Paul Langlois, Gord Sinclair	The Tragically Hip: A National Celebration	
2017; 5th Canadian Screen Awards	Alessia Cara	2016 Juno Awards	
2017; 5th Canadian Screen Awards	Mark Critch, Cathy Jones, Susan Kent, Shaun Majumder, Meredith MacNeill	This Hour Has 22 Minutes	
2017; 5th Canadian Screen Awards	Carolyn Taylor, Meredith MacNeill, Aurora Browne, Jennifer Whalen	Baroness von Sketch Show	
2017; 5th Canadian Screen Awards	Whitehorse (Luke Doucet, Melissa McClelland)	2016 Juno Awards	
2018; 6th Canadian Screen Awards
2018; 6th Canadian Screen Awards	Carolyn Taylor, Meredith MacNeill, Aurora Browne, Jennifer Whalen	Baroness von Sketch Show	
2018; 6th Canadian Screen Awards	Mark Critch, Cathy Jones, Susan Kent, Shaun Majumder, Meredith MacNeill	This Hour Has 22 Minutes	
2018; 6th Canadian Screen Awards	Emma Hunter, Miguel Rivas, Aisha Alfa, Marilla Wex, Dave Barclay	The Beaverton	
2018; 6th Canadian Screen Awards	Rick Mercer	Rick Mercer Report	
2019; 7th Canadian Screen Awards
2019; 7th Canadian Screen Awards	Carolyn Taylor, Meredith MacNeill, Aurora Browne, Jennifer Whalen, Jamie Brown	Baroness von Sketch Show	
2019; 7th Canadian Screen Awards	Camille Beaudoin, Eric Rebalkin, James Higuchi, Aimée Beaudoin, Jeff Halaby, Mark Meer, Matt Alden, Howie Miller, Sheldon Elter, Joleen Ballendine	Caution: May Contain Nuts	
2019; 7th Canadian Screen Awards	Mark Critch, Cathy Jones, Susan Kent, Trent McClellan, Michael Donovan, Peter McBain, Steven DeNure, Mark Gosine, Jenipher Ritchie	This Hour Has 22 Minutes	
2020; 8th Canadian Screen Awards
2020; 8th Canadian Screen Awards	Carolyn Taylor, Meredith MacNeill, Aurora Browne, Jennifer Whalen, Jamie Brown, Graham Ludlow, Jeff Peeler	Baroness von Sketch Show	
2020; 8th Canadian Screen Awards	Laszlo Barna, Melissa Williamson, Jeff Detsky, Luke Gordon Field, Nicole Butler, Jocelyn Geddie, Scott Montgomery, Emma Hunter, Miguel Rivas	The Beaverton	
2020; 8th Canadian Screen Awards	Guled Abdi, Vance Banzo, Tim Blair, Franco Nguyen, Bruce McCulloch, Susan Cavan, Paula J. Smith	TallBoyz	
2020; 8th Canadian Screen Awards	Mark Critch, Cathy Jones, Susan Kent, Trent McClellan, Michael Donovan, Peter McBain, Mark Gosine, Ann Loi, Jenipher Ritchie	This Hour Has 22 Minutes	
2021; 9th Canadian Screen Awards
2021; 9th Canadian Screen Awards	Carolyn Taylor, Meredith MacNeill, Aurora Browne, Jennifer Whalen	Baroness von Sketch Show	
2021; 9th Canadian Screen Awards	Maggie Cassella, Katie Rigg, Carolyn Taylor, Gavin Crawford, Lea DeLaria, Colin Mochrie, Kinley Mochrie, Deb McGrath	We're Funny That Way: The Virtual Pride Special	
2021; 9th Canadian Screen Awards	Cathy Jones, Mark Critch, Susan Kent, Trent McClellan	This Hour Has 22 Minutes	
2022; 10th Canadian Screen Awards
2022; 10th Canadian Screen Awards	Guled Abdi, Vance Banzo, Tim Blair, Franco Nguyen	TallBoyz	
2022; 10th Canadian Screen Awards	Mark Critch, Cathy Jones, Trent McClellan	This Hour Has 22 Minutes	
2022; 10th Canadian Screen Awards	Jon Dore	Humour Resources	
2022; 10th Canadian Screen Awards	Russell Peters, Sabrina Jalees, K. Trevor Wilson, Ennis Esmer, Keith Pedro, Daniel Woodrow, Mike Rita, Brittany Lyseng	Roast Battle Canada	
2023; 11th Canadian Screen Awards
2023; 11th Canadian Screen Awards	Mark Critch, Trent McClellan, Aba Amuquandoh, Stacey McGunnigle	This Hour Has 22 Minutes	
2023; 11th Canadian Screen Awards	Guled Abdi, Tim Blair, Vance Banzo, Franco Nguyen	TallBoyz	
2023; 11th Canadian Screen Awards	Nicola Correia-Damude, Adam DiMarco, Carlos Gonzalez-Vio, Sydney Scotia, Gregory Prest, Paolo Santalucia, Chris Robinson, Kwasi Thomas, Andrew Wheeler, Sharon Crandall, Vanessa Lauren Fox	Pillow Talk	
2023; 11th Canadian Screen Awards	Russell Peters, Sabrina Jalees, K. Trevor Wilson, Ennis Esmer, Salma Hindy, Sophie Buddle, Ron Josol, Jean Paul	Roast Battle Canada	
2024; 12th Canadian Screen Awards
2024; 12th Canadian Screen Awards	Mark Critch, Trent McClellan, Aba Amuquandoh, Stacey McGunnigle, Chris Wilson	This Hour Has 22 Minutes	
2024; 12th Canadian Screen Awards	Nicola Correia-Damude, Matt Mazur, Carlos Gonzalez-Vio, Sydney Scotia, Gregory Prest, Paolo Santalucia, Chris Robinson, Kwasi Thomas, Andrew Wheeler, Sharon Crandall	Pillow Talk	
2024; 12th Canadian Screen Awards	Ennis Esmer, Russell Peters, Sabrina Jalees, K. Trevor Wilson, Allie Pearse, Bren D'Souza, Tyler Morrison, Crystal Ferrier	Roast Battle Canada	
2024; 12th Canadian Screen Awards	Isabel Kanaan, Aldrin Bundoc, Joy Castro, Nicco Lorenzo Garcia, Justin Santiago	Abroad	
2025; 13th Canadian Screen Awards
2025; 13th Canadian Screen Awards	Mark Critch, Trent McClellan, Aba Amuquandoh, Stacey McGunnigle, Chris Wilson	This Hour Has 22 Minutes	
2025; 13th Canadian Screen Awards	Ennis Esmer, Russell Peters, Sabrina Jalees, K. Trevor Wilson, Hisham Kelati, Mark Little, Marito Lopez, Sophie Buddle	Roast Battle Canada	
2025; 13th Canadian Screen Awards	Isabel Kanaan, Joy Castro, Justin Santiago, Nicco Lorenzo Garcia, Aldrin Bundoc	Abroad	
2025; 13th Canadian Screen Awards	Gaitrie Persaud, Graham Kent, Margaret Rose, Samantha Wyss, Sivert Das, Wesley Magee-Saxton, Yousef Kadoura, Courtney Gilmour	The Squeaky Wheel: Canada	
