= Jordan Foisy =

Canadian stand-up comedian and writer

Jordan Foisy is a Canadian stand-up comedian and writer from Sault Ste. Marie, Ontario, most noted as head writer of the sketch comedy television series This Hour Has 22 Minutes.

== Awards ==
Award	Date of ceremony	Category	Work	Result	Ref.
Canadian Comedy Awards	2019	Best Writing in a TV Series or Special	This Hour Has 22 Minutes with Peter McBain, Mike Allison, Scott Montgomery, Mark Critch, Dean Jenkinson, Susan Kent, Heidi Brander, Kevin Shustack, Sophie Buddle, Graham Clark, Mayce Galoni, Ann Pornel	Nominated	
Canadian Screen Awards	2021	Best Writing in a Variety or Sketch Comedy Program or Series	This Hour Has 22 Minutes with Heidi Brander, Mark Critch, Susan Kent, Adam Christie, Dean Jenkinson, Kevin Shustack, Mayce Galoni, Aisha Brown, Brandon Hackett, Jon Blair, Sophie Buddle, Bob Kerr	Nominated	
Canadian Screen Awards	2022	Best Writing in a Variety or Sketch Comedy Program or Series	This Hour Has 22 Minutes with Heidi Brander, Adam Christie, Cathy Jones, Mark Critch, Trent McClellan, Jeremy Woodcock, Aisha Brown, Nigel Grinstead, Aba Amuquandoh, Nadine Bhabha, Leonard Chan, Adele Dicks, Alexander Nunez, Gillian Bartolucci, Chris Wilson, Dean Jenkinson, Matt Wright	Nominated	
Canadian Screen Awards	2024	Best Writing in a Variety or Sketch Comedy Program or Series	This Hour Has 22 Minutes with Mark Critch, Jeremy Woodcock, Nigel Grinstead, Aisha Brown, Aba Amuquandoh, Chris Wilson, Travis Lindsay, Stacey McGunnigle, Ashley Botting, Sarah Blackmore, Dan Dillabough, Ajahnis Charley, Allana Reoch, Salma Hindy, Trent McClellan	Won	
Canadian Screen Awards	2025	Best Writing in a Variety or Sketch Comedy Program or Series	This Hour Has 22 Minutes with Mark Critch, Jeremy Woodcock, Aisha Brown, Nigel Grinstead, Aba Amuquandoh, Chris Wilson, Travis Lindsay, Stacey McGunnigle, Ashley Botting, Dan Dillabough, Ajahnis Charley, Alan Shane Lewis, Maddy Kelly, Heather Mariko, Kyle Hickey	Won	
