= Jeremy Woodcock =

Canadian stand-up comedian and writer

Jeremy Woodcock is a Canadian stand-up comedian and writer, most noted as a writer for the sketch comedy series This Hour Has 22 Minutes.

He began performing both sketch and stand-up comedy while studying at Wilfrid Laurier University, and has been associated with the sketch comedy troupes Get Some, The Sketchersons, and Rulers of the Universe, as well as performing stand-up comedy at the Winnipeg Comedy Festival and Just for Laughs. In 2013, he hosted Finding Bessarion, a short comedic documentary film about Bessarion station, the least-used subway station on the Toronto subway system, as part of the Urbane Explorer documentary web series.

== Awards ==
Award	Date of ceremony	Category	Recipient	Result	Ref.
Canadian Comedy Awards	2015	Best Writing in a TV Series or Special	This Hour Has 22 Minutes with Mark Critch, Mike Allison, Bob Kerr, Jon Blair, Sonya Bell, Tim Polley, Heidi Brander, Adam Christie, Pat Dussault, Cathy Jones, Dean Jenkinson, Ron Sparks, Scott Vrooman	Won	
Canadian Screen Awards	2016	Best Writing in a Variety or Sketch Comedy Program or Series	This Hour Has 22 Minutes with Mark Critch, Mike Allison, Bob Kerr, Jon Blair, Heidi Brander, Sonya Bell, Pat Dussault, Dean Jenkinson, Mary Walsh, Adam Christie	Nominated	
Canadian Screen Awards	2017	Best Writing in a Variety or Sketch Comedy Program or Series	This Hour Has 22 Minutes with Mike Allison, Mark Critch, Bob Kerr, Greg Thomey, Jon Blair, Tim Polley, Heidi Brander, Adam Christie, Scott Vrooman, Dean Jenkinson, Cathy Jones, Mary Walsh	Nominated	
Canadian Screen Awards	2022	Best Writing in a Variety or Sketch Comedy Program or Series	This Hour Has 22 Minutes with Heidi Brander, Adam Christie, Cathy Jones, Mark Critch, Trent McClellan, Jordan Foisy, Aisha Brown, Nigel Grinstead, Aba Amuquandoh, Nadine Bhabha, Leonard Chan, Adele Dicks, Alexander Nunez, Gillian Bartolucci, Chris Wilson, Dean Jenkinson, Matt Wright	Nominated	
Canadian Screen Awards	2024	Best Writing in a Variety or Sketch Comedy Program or Series	This Hour Has 22 Minutes with Jordan Foisy, Mark Critch, Nigel Grinstead, Aisha Brown, Aba Amuquandoh, Chris Wilson, Travis Lindsay, Stacey McGunnigle, Ashley Botting, Sarah Blackmore, Dan Dillabough, Ajahnis Charley, Allana Reoch, Salma Hindy, Trent McClellan	Won	
Canadian Screen Awards	2025	Best Writing in a Variety or Sketch Comedy Program or Series	Roast Battle Canada with George Reinblatt, Aisha Brown, Jeff Rothpan, Rob Michaels	Nominated	
Canadian Screen Awards	2025	Best Writing in a Variety or Sketch Comedy Program or Series	This Hour Has 22 Minutes with Jordan Foisy, Mark Critch, Aisha Brown, Nigel Grinstead, Aba Amuquandoh, Chris Wilson, Travis Lindsay, Stacey McGunnigle, Ashley Botting, Dan Dillabough, Ajahnis Charley, Alan Shane Lewis, Maddy Kelly, Heather Mariko, Kyle Hickey	Won	
Cream of Comedy	2014	Tim Sims Encouragement Award		Nominated	
