= Roast Battle Canada =

Canadian television comedy series

- Genre: Comedy; Satire; Stand-up comedy
- Presented by: Ennis Esmer
- Judges: Russell Peters; Sabrina Jalees; K. Trevor Wilson
- Country of origin: Canada
- Original language: English
- No. of seasons: 5
- No. of episodes: 40

Original release
- Release: October 11, 2021 – present

Roast Battle Canada is a Canadian television comedy series, which premiered on CTV Comedy Channel in October 2021. An adaptation of the American series Jeff Ross Presents Roast Battle, the series presents battles in which pairs of comedians take turns roasting each other on stage, before a panel of judges who decide the winner of each battle.

The judges for the series are Russell Peters, Sabrina Jalees and K. Trevor Wilson, with Ennis Esmer serving as host of the series.

A French-language edition, Roast Battle : le grand duel, was also launched in 2022 on Noovo for francophone audiences in Quebec.

The fifth season of the series was taped in July 2025 at the Just for Laughs festival.

== Episodes ==
The winner of each roast battle is in bold.

=== Season 1 ===
No.	Competitors	Original release date
1	Daniel Woodrow vs. **Keith Pedro**; **Brittany Lyseng** vs. Mike Rita	October 11, 2021
2	Jarrett Campbell vs. **Sophie Buddle**; Hannan Younis vs. **Stacey McGunnigle**	October 18, 2021
3	**Olivia Stadler** vs. Paul Thompson; **Cassie Cao** vs. Hunter Collins	October 25, 2021
4	**Salma Hindy** vs. Jean Paul; Sterling Scott vs. **Brittany Lyseng**	November 1, 2021
5	Daniel Woodrow vs. **Sophie Buddle**; **Jarrett Campbell** vs. Mike Rita	November 8, 2021
6	**Alan Shane Lewis** vs. Sterling Scott; Amish Patel vs. **Olivia Stadler**	November 15, 2021
7	**Hannan Younis** vs. Keith Pedro; Jeff Paul vs. **Hunter Collins**	November 22, 2021
8	**Alan Shane Lewis** vs. Stacey McGunnigle; **Faisal Butt** vs. Paul Thompson	November 29, 2021

=== Season 2 ===
No.	Competitors	Original release date
1	**Salma Hindy** vs. Sophie Buddle; **Jean Paul** vs. Ron Josol	June 13, 2022
2	Daniel Woodrow vs. **Nick Nemeroff**; Adrienne Fish vs. **Courtney Gilmour**	June 20, 2022
3	**Andrew Johnston** vs. Tyler Morrison; Cassie Cao vs. **Salma Hindy**	June 27, 2022
4	**Daniel Woodrow** vs. Jackie Pirico; Hunter Collins vs. **Kyle Brownrigg**	July 4, 2022
5	**Sophie Buddle** vs. Brittany Lyseng; Andrew Johnston vs. **Cassie Cao**	July 11, 2022
6	**Nick Nemeroff** vs. Jackie Pirico; Norm Alconcel vs. **Crystal Ferrier**	July 18, 2022
7	Keith Pedro vs. **Olivia Stadler**; **Kyle Brownrigg** vs. Adrienne Fish	July 25, 2022
8	**Jean Paul** vs. Keith Pedro; **Hunter Collins** vs. Courtney Gilmour	August 1, 2022

=== Season 3 ===
No.	Competitors	Original release date
1	Allie Pearse vs. **Bren D'Souza**; **Tyler Morrison** vs. Crystal Ferrier	July 10, 2023
2	Rachel Schaefer vs. **Sophie Buddle**; Alan Shane Lewis vs. **Todd Graham**	July 17, 2023
3	Olivia Stadler vs. **Kyle Brownrigg**; **Garrett Jamieson** vs. Keith Pedro	July 24, 2023
4	Tom Henry vs. **Todd Graham**; **Crystal Ferrier** vs. Cassie Cao	July 31, 2023
5	**Dakota Ray Hebert** vs. Paul Rabliauskas; **Sophie Buddle** vs. Jordan Welwood	August 7, 2023
6	Keith Pedro vs. **Allie Pearse**; Danish Anwar vs. **Olivia Stadler**	August 14, 2023
7	Jordan Welwood vs. **Tyler Morrison**; **Dakota Ray Hebert** vs. Alan Shane Lewis	August 21, 2023
8	**Rachel Schaefer** vs. Bren D'Souza; Cassie Cao vs. **Daniel Woodrow**	August 28, 2023

=== Season 4 ===
No.	Competitors	Original release date
1	Laura Leibow vs. **Sophie Buddle**; Marito Lopez vs. **Jarrett Campbell**	June 3, 2024
2	Bren D'Souza vs. **Kyle Brownrigg**; Rachel Schaeffer vs. **Tom Henry**	June 10, 2024
3	Allie Pearse vs. **Chris Robinson**; **Crystal Ferrier** vs. Kate Baron	June 17, 2024
4	Todd Graham vs. **Mark Little**; Ajahnis Charley vs. **Tom Hearn**	June 24, 2024
5	**Crystal Ferrier** vs. Rachel Schaefer; Dakota Ray Hebert vs. **Bren D'Souza**	July 1, 2024
6	Jean Paul vs. **Jarrett Campbell**; Chad Anderson vs. **Laura Leibow**	July 8, 2024
7	**Kate Barron** vs. Kyle Brownrigg; Ava Val vs. **Hunter Collins**	July 15, 2024
8	Hisham Kelati vs. **Mark Little**; Marito Lopez vs. **Sophie Buddle**	July 22, 2024

=== Season 5 ===
The fifth season was taped at the 2025 Just for Laughs festival, and premiered on January 12, 2026. One roast battle in the season saw the competing comedians, Mark Little and Laura Cilevitz, refrain from roasting each other, instead turning their sights onto jointly roasting Esmer.

No.	Competitors	Original release date
1	Dino Archie vs **Faris Hytiaa**; Alistair Ogden vs **Jackie Pirico**	January 12, 2026
2	**Jimbo** vs Lemon; Allie Pearse vs **Jeff McEnery**	January 19, 2026
3	**Crystal Ferrier** vs Rebecca Reeds; **Tranna Wintour** vs Sam Sferrazza	January 26, 2026
4	**Kyle Brownrigg** vs Anjelica Scannura; **Andrew Packer** vs Nitish Sakhuja	February 2, 2026
5	**Mark Little vs Laura Cilevitz** (vs Ennis Esmer); **Ben Sosa-Wright** vs Alistair Ogden	February 9, 2026
6	**Tyler Morrison** vs Michelle Forrester; Che Durena vs **Jacob Balshin**	February 16, 2026
7	**Graham Chittenden** vs Aisha Alfa; Jackie Pirico vs **Tom Henry**	February 23, 2026
8	**Jon Dore** vs Rebecca Kohler; **Kenny Robinson** vs Darren Frost	March 2, 2026

== Awards ==
Award	Date of ceremony	Category	Recipient	Result	Ref.
Canadian Screen Awards	2022	Best Sketch Comedy Series	Bruce Hills, Russell Peters, Dan Bennett, Shane Corkery, Anton Leo, George Reinblatt, Zoe Rabnett, Nick Brazao, Shelagh O'Brien	Nominated	
Canadian Screen Awards	2022	Best Ensemble Performance in a Variety or Sketch Comedy Program or Series	Russell Peters, Sabrina Jalees, K. Trevor Wilson, Ennis Esmer, Keith Pedro, Daniel Woodrow, Mike Rita, Brittany Lyseng	Nominated	
Canadian Screen Awards	2022	Best Direction in a Variety or Sketch Comedy Program or Series	Shelagh O'Brien	Nominated	
Canadian Screen Awards	2023	Best Sketch Comedy Program or Series	Bruce Hills, Russell Peters, George Reinblatt, Dan Bennett, Shane Corkery, Anton Leo, Shelagh O'Brien, Zoe Rabnett, Steve Glassman	Nominated	
Canadian Screen Awards	2023	Best Ensemble Performance in a Variety or Sketch Comedy Program or Series	Russell Peters, Sabrina Jalees, K. Trevor Wilson, Ennis Esmer, Salma Hindy, Sophie Buddle, Ron Josol, Jean Paul	Nominated	
Canadian Screen Awards	2023	Best Direction in a Variety or Sketch Comedy Program or Series	Shelagh O'Brien	Nominated	
Canadian Screen Awards	2023	Best Writing in a Variety or Sketch Comedy Program or Series	George Reinblatt, Aisha Brown, Jeff Rothpan, Andrew Johnston, Rob Michaels	Nominated	
Canadian Screen Awards	2024	Best Ensemble Performance in a Variety or Sketch Comedy Program or Series	Russell Peters, Sabrina Jalees, K. Trevor Wilson, Ennis Esmer, Allie Pearse, Bren D'Souza, Tyler Morrison, Crystal Ferrier	Nominated	
Canadian Screen Awards	2024	Best Direction in a Variety or Sketch Comedy Program or Series	Shelagh O'Brien	Nominated	
Canadian Screen Awards	2024	Best Writing in a Variety or Sketch Comedy Program or Series	George Reinblatt, Aisha Brown, Jeff Rothpan, Rob Michaels	Nominated	
Canadian Screen Awards	2025	Best Sketch Comedy Program or Series	Dan Bennett, Shane Corkery, Anton Leo, Bruce Hills, Russell Peters, George Reinblatt, Shelagh O'Brien, Zoe Rabnett	Nominated	
Canadian Screen Awards	2025	Best Ensemble Performance in a Variety or Sketch Comedy Program or Series	Russell Peters, Sabrina Jalees, K. Trevor Wilson, Ennis Esmer, Hisham Kelati, Mark Little, Marito Lopez, Sophie Buddle	Nominated	
Canadian Screen Awards	2025	Best Direction in a Variety or Sketch Comedy Program or Series	Shelagh O'Brien	Nominated	
Canadian Screen Awards	2025	Best Writing in a Variety or Sketch Comedy Program or Series	George Reinblatt, Aisha Brown, Jeff Rothpan, Rob Michaels, Jeremy Woodcock	Nominated	
