= The New Wave of Standup =

Canadian comedy web series

The New Wave of Standup is a Canadian comedy web series, which premiered in 2020 on CBC Gem. The series features performance sets by 12 emerging Canadian comedians, recorded at the Vancouver edition of the Just for Laughs festival in February 2020.

Performers in the first season were Cassie Cao, Jacob Samuel, Ava Val, Yumi Nagashima, Aaron Read, Salma Hindy, Kyle Brownrigg, Paul Rabliauskas, Brittany Lyseng, Ola Dada, Matty Vu and Brett Forte. A second season was released in 2022, featuring performances by Andrea Jin, Hisham Kelati, Allie Pearse, Nick Nemeroff, Abdul Aziz, Tin Lorica, Juliana Rodrigues, Maddy Kelly, Hoodo Hersi, Steev Letts, Janelle Niles, Ajahnis Charley and Marito Lopez.

A third season, released in 2023, features Malik Elassal, Courtney Gilmour, Travis Lindsay, Heidi Brander, Seán Devlin, Rachel Schaefer, Dino Archie, Mike Green, Bren D'Souza, Jacob Balshin, Laura Leibow, Charles Haycock, Jackie Pirico and Bobby Warrener.

The fourth season, released August 28, 2023, features Alannah Brittany, Zabrina Douglas, Ryan Williams, Mikey Dubbs, Brandon Ash-Mohammed, Mayce Galoni, Dakota Ray Hebert, Clare Belford, Chad Anderson, Daniel Woodrow, Ben Sosa-Wright, Sophia Johnson and Natasha Lyn-Myles.

Released in 2024, the fifth season features Alistair Ogden, Ahren Belisle, Cassidy Anhorn, Eva Alexopoulos, Faris Hytiaa, Jordanne Brown, Myles Anderson, Rachel Manson, Rebecca Reeds, Sam Sferrezza, Spencer Adamus and Tamara Shevon.
