= Comedy Night with Rick Mercer =

Canadian television comedy series

Comedy Night with Rick Mercer is a Canadian television comedy series, which premiered on CBC Television in September 2022. Hosted by Rick Mercer and produced by Just for Laughs, the series consists of stand-up comedy performances by Canadian comedians recorded in various locations across the country on a national comedy tour.

== Episodes ==
No.	Original release date
1	September 13, 2022
Sophie Buddle, Kyle Brownrigg, Dave Merheje, Jean Paul
2	September 20, 2022
DeAnne Smith, Keith Pedro, Seán Cullen, Alex Wood
3	September 27, 2022
Ivan Decker, Dino Archie, Marito Lopez, Julia Hladkowicz
4	October 4, 2022
Ali Hassan, Laurie Elliott, Derek Edwards, Nathan Macintosh
5	October 11, 2022
D.J. Demers, Michael Moses, Dakota Ray Hebert, Abby Roberge
6	October 18, 2022
Trent McClellan, Nikki Payne, Salma Hindy, Travis Lindsay
7	October 25, 2022
Ryan Belleville, Inés Anaya, Eman El-Husseini, Robby Hoffman
8	November 1, 2022
Ted Morris, Mark Forward, Tranna Wintour, Erica Sigurdson
