= Nadine Bhabha =

Canadian actress

- Occupations: Actress, producer, writer
- Years active: 2020–present

Nadine Bhabha is a Canadian actress, producer, and writer from Toronto, Ontario. She is best known for her roles on Letterkenny, One More Time, The Communist's Daughter, and Heated Rivalry. She made her debut on This Hour Has 22 Minutes in 2020.

== Career ==
Bhabha graduated from York University with a degree in theatre.

== Filmography ==
=== Acting credits ===
Film

Year	Title	Role(s)	Notes
2018	The Fates	Lachesis	Short film
2019	Lovers, Leftovers	Suraya	Short film
2022	Terror Train	Sadie	
2022	Terror Train 2	Sadie	
2024	Chronic	Frankie	Short film
2024	Please, After You	Jordan	

Television

Year	Title	Role(s)	Notes
2018	Imposters	Harbor Attendant	Episode: "Trouble Maybe"
2018–2023	Letterkenny	Bianca	Recurring role
2019	Wayne	Female Clerk	Episode: "Chapter Two: No Priests"
2019	Killjoys	Woman	Episode: "Cherchez la Bitch"
2020	Nurses	Sonia Cedarson	2 episodes
2020	Odd Squad	Tessa	Episode: "Mr. Unpredictable/Down the Tubes"
2020	A Christmas Exchange	Angela	Television movie
2021	Kim's Convenience	Ingrid	Episode: "Slippery Slope"
2021	The Communist's Daughter	Jasmine	7 episodes
2021	Christmas with a Prince: The Royal Baby	Jan	Television movie
2022	Hudson & Rex	Yazmin	Episode: "Impawster Syndrome"
2022	Run the Burbs	Zelena	Episode: "Phamily Games Night"
2023	Children Ruin Everything	Melanie	Episode: "Clothes"
2023	The Holiday Shift	Marissa	Main role
2024	Law & Order Toronto: Criminal Intent	Melinda Mitra	Episode: "The Real Eve"
2024	One More Time	Gwen	8 episodes
2025	Heated Rivalry	Elena	3 episodes
2025	Settle Down	Devon	5 episodes
2026	Slo Pitch	Ashley Natasha	1 episode

=== Other credits ===
Year	Title	Writer	Producer	Notes
2019	Lovers, Leftovers	Yes	Yes	Short film
2020–21	This Hour Has 22 Minutes	Yes	No	TV series; wrote 9 episodes
2022–25	Children Ruin Everything	Yes	No	TV series; wrote 2 episodes Also story coordinator (season 2) and story editor (season 4)
2024	A Silent Witness' Witness	Yes	Co-producer	Short film
2025	Pick One	No	Associate	Short film
2026	Slo Pitch	Yes	No	TV series; wrote 2 episodes
2026	Yaga	No	No	TV series; executive story editor

== Awards ==
Award	Date of ceremony	Category	Work	Result	Ref.
Canadian Screen Awards	2022	Best Writing in a Variety or Sketch Comedy Program or Series	This Hour Has 22 Minutes with Heidi Brander, Adam Christie, Cathy Jones, Mark Critch, Trent McClellan, Jeremy Woodcock, Jordan Foisy, Aisha Brown, Nigel Grinstead, Aba Amuquandoh, Leonard Chan, Adele Dicks, Alexander Nunez, Gillian Bartolucci, Chris Wilson, Dean Jenkinson, Matt Wright	Nominated	
Canadian Screen Awards	2022	Best Supporting Performance in a Web Program or Series	The Communist's Daughter	Nominated	
Canadian Screen Awards	2024	Best Supporting Performance in a Web Program or Series	How to Fail as a Popstar	Nominated	
Canadian Screen Awards	2026	Best Guest Performance in a Drama Series	Heated Rivalry	Won	
Canadian Screen Awards	2026	Best Supporting Performance in a Web Program or Series	Settle Down	Nominated	
