= Nile Séguin =

Nile Séguin (born 1973) is a Canadian stand-up comedian and writer from Ottawa, Ontario.

== Biography ==
Born to a French Canadian mother and a Rwandan father, he studied psychology at the University of Ottawa, performing stand-up comedy for the first time at local shows in the Ottawa area. Following graduation he continued to perform as a comedian at comedy clubs and festivals across Canada, including the Winnipeg Comedy Festival, the Halifax Comedy Festival, and Just For Laughs. He was the first comedian ever to perform shows in both French and English at Just for Laughs in the same year.

He has written and performed four one man shows: Fear of a Brown Planet, Evil is the New Good, History: Deleted Scenes and Extras, and Company Man. He received a Canadian Comedy Award nomination for Best One Person Show at the 10th Canadian Comedy Awards in 2009 for Fear of a Brown Planet, and for Best Taped Live Performance at the 15th Canadian Comedy Awards in 2014 for his Just for Laughs show.

He headlined his own Comedy Now! special in 2011.

He has also appeared on MuchMusic's Video On Trial, as well as the film Ham & Cheese, the radio comedy series The Debaters, the television sitcom Second Jen, and the sketch comedy series Abroad.

He has written for the radio sketch comedy series The Irrelevant Show, and the television series The Hour, This Hour Has 22 Minutes, The Beaverton and Still Standing. He has been a two-time Canadian Screen Award nominee for his television work, receiving nominations for Best Writing in a Factual Program or Series at the 4th Canadian Screen Awards in 2016 for Still Standing, and Best Writing in a Variety or Sketch Comedy Program or Series at the 6th Canadian Screen Awards for The Beaverton.

In the early 2020s he came out as pansexual, and performed at a specifically LGBTQ-themed comedy show for the first time at the 2026 edition of Robert Watson's annual Gay AF Comedy Pridestravaganza at Buddies in Bad Times in 2026.
