= Jackie Pirico =

Canadian stand-up comedian

Jackie Pirico is a Canadian comedian and broadcaster. Her comedy album Splash Pad received a Juno Award nomination for Comedy Album of the Year at the Juno Awards of 2023.

She has also had acting roles in the comedy-drama film Sundowners, the web series True Dating Stories and the television series Children Ruin Everything, and appeared in two episodes in the second season of Roast Battle Canada against Daniel Woodrow and Nick Nemeroff. She was featured in a third-season episode of The New Wave of Standup.

In 2024 she became co-host of the morning drive time show on Toronto radio station CIND-FM.
