= Marito Lopez =

Salvadoran-born Canadian stand-up comedian and actor

- Born: El Salvador
- Occupation(s): Actor, comedian
- Known for: One More Time

Marito Lopez is a Salvadoran-born Canadian stand-up comedian and actor, most noted for his recurring role as Carlito in the 2024 comedy series One More Time.

Born in El Salvador, he immigrated to Canada with his family in childhood, and grew up in Calgary, Alberta.

He released his debut comedy album, Beautiful Papi, in 2022. In the same year he appeared in the stand-up comedy performance television series The New Wave of Standup and Comedy Night with Rick Mercer.

In 2024 he appeared in two episodes of the fourth season of Roast Battle Canada, competing against Jarrett Campbell in the first episode and Sophie Buddle in the eighth. He has also performed in The Debaters, and had a regular voice role in the animated comedy series Gary and His Demons.

He received two Canadian Screen Award nominations at the 13th Canadian Screen Awards in 2025, with nods in Best Performance in a Guest Role in a Comedy Series for One More Time and Best Ensemble Performance in a Variety or Sketch Comedy Program or Series for Roast Battle Canada.
