= Ava Val =

Canadian stand-up comedian

Ava Val is the stage name of Ava Valiulis, a Canadian stand-up comedian best known for her appearances in The New Wave of Standup, Roast Battle Canada, and the fourth season of Canada's Got Talent.

A graduate of the University of Western Ontario, she began her comedy career in the 2000s. Known at the time as Al Val, she presented in the persona of a frat boy with dreadlocks, performing comedy strongly influenced by Dane Cook. Another significant influence on her comedy, Eddie/Suzy Izzard, later inspired her to open up about her own struggles with her gender identity, and after coming out as genderfluid in the late 2010s, she characterized her early persona as essentially a deflection, designed to keep audiences from actually knowing anything about her as a person.

She began her full gender transition in the early 2020s, but continued to perform as Al until officially changing her name to Ava in 2024. In the same year, Val and Robert Watson headlined Gay AF, a national comedy tour highlighting LGBTQ comedians. She also appeared against Hunter Collins in the fourth season of Roast Battle Canada, and her comedy special So Brave was released on YouTube by 800 Pound Gorilla Media.

In 2025, after Donald Trump issued Executive Order 14168, Val was forced to cancel her scheduled comedy tour in the United States due to the risk of being detained or imprisoned at the border, although she continued with her Canadian tour dates. In the same year she competed on Canada's Got Talent.

She has also been a writer for Roast Battle Canada and This Hour Has 22 Minutes.
