= Sterling Scott =

Canadian stand-up comedian

Sterling Scott is a Canadian stand-up comedian based in Edmonton, Alberta.

Originally from Scarborough, Ontario, he moved to Edmonton after an unsuccessful audition to compete in the 2006 MuchMusic VJ Search. After briefly working in the Alberta oil sands, he began his comedy career in Edmonton in the late 2000s. In Edmonton he was the regular host of The Dating Game at Krush Ultralounge, a live comedy game show based on The Dating Game which scored him an audition to produce a television version for Kevin Hart's Laugh Out Loud Productions.

He competed twice in the San Francisco Comedy Competition, finishing in fourth place behind winner Samuel J. Comroe in 2014 and winning the competition in 2019. He was also a third-place finalist in the Seattle International Comedy Competition in 2014.

In 2020 he was one of the hosts of Be the Change, a digital anti-racism special produced as a response to that year's George Floyd protests.

In 2021 he appeared in the first season of Roast Battle Canada, facing Brittany Lyseng in the fourth episode and Alan Shane Lewis in the sixth. He has also appeared on CBC Radio One's The Debaters, and has performed at comedy venues across Canada including the Just for Laughs festival.

In 2024 he competed in the fourth season of Canada's Got Talent, receiving the golden buzzer from Trish Stratus.
