= Seattle International Comedy Competition =

Stand-up comedy competition

- Status: Active
- Genre: Stand-up comedy
- Dates: 1980-present
- Locations: Seattle, WA, U.S.
- Website: http://seattlecomedycompetition.org/

The Seattle International Comedy Competition is a month-long stand-up comedy competition held at various venues throughout Washington State. It has been held every year since 1980 until 2020, when the competition was not run due to pandemic restrictions.

== Format ==
Contestants are scored by a panel of judges, not by audience vote. 32 contestants are divided into two week-long heats. The 5 top-rated performers from each heat meet for a week of semi-final performances, and the top five of those compete in the finals week.

== Competitors ==
Many well-known comedians and actors have competed, including 1997 winner Mitch Hedberg, Aisha Tyler, Christopher Titus, Ron Funches, Arj Barker, Sean Kent, radio host Bill Radke, Dwight Slade, Dax Jordan, Auggie Smith, Tom Cotter, Joe Klocek, Jeff Dye, Josh Gondelman, Anne Edmonds, Ria Lina, and Rory Scovel.

The winner of the 2016 Seattle International Comedy Competition was Preacher Lawson.

The winner of the 2019 Seattle International Comedy Competition was Nancy Norton, who became the second of only two women to ever win the Seattle International Comedy Competition, following the late Peggy Platt, who won in 1985. The 2021 Champion, Danny Martinello, also becomes the second of only two Canadian citizens to ever win the competition, following Damonde Tschritter in 2006.

The 2022 champion, Ari Matti from Estonia, became the first performer from outside of North America to win the competition.

== Previous winners ==
Year	Winner	Runners-Up			
Year	Winner	2nd	3rd	4th	5th
1980	David Silverman	Dave Parsons	Peter Anderson	Colin Campbell	Gary Larson
1981	Evan Davis	Peggy Platt	Rick Ducommun	Arnold Mukai	Jan Barrett
1982	Gary Larson	Chris Alpine	Arnold Mukai	W.D. Hall	Ross Shafer
1983	Ross Shafer	Peggy Platt	Arnold Mukai	Steve Smith	Dale Irvin
1984	Billy Jaye	Peggy Platt	Rod Long	Robert Jenkins	Earl Burks
1985	Peggy Platt	Mike "Boats" Johnson	Tom McTigue	John Johnson	James Stephens III
1986	Chris Alpine	Jebb Fink	Monty Hoffman	Robert Jenkins	James Stephens III
1987	Rod Long	Christopher Titus	James Stephens III	Brad Upton	Jebb Fink
1988	Steve Stajich	Brad Upton	Mike Ferrucci	Dean Oleson	Mike Wally Walter
1989	Matt Weinhold	Dave Wehner	Dwight Slade	Louis Johnson Jr.	Alpha Trivette
1990	Elliot Maxx	Greg Wingo	Rodney Sherwood	Andre Covington	Johnny Ray
1991	Kermet Apio	Dean Oleson	Stephen B	Ngaio Bealum	Rushion McDonald
1992	Bill Radke	Darryl Lenox	Dan Almont	Earl Burks	Tracy Tuffs
1993	Todd Sawyer	Derrick Coleman	Mike Wally Walter	Earl Burks	Paul Lyons
1994	Tom Cotter	Kenny C	David Crowe	Arj Barker	Steven Allen Green
1995	David Crowe	Floyd J Phillips	James Inman	Randy Thompson	Aisha Tyler
1996	John McClellan	Floyd J Phillips	Don Friesen	Dave Fulton	Kerry Talmage
1997	Mitch Hedberg	Auggie Smith	Duane Goad	Costaki Economopoulos	Heneghen
1998	Ron Osborne & Joe Vespaziani (tied)	n/a	Tracy Tuffs	Bengt Washburn	Arlo Stone
1999	Darryl Lenox	Tanyalee Davis	Damonde Tschritter	Rick Kunkler	Heneghen
2000	Floyd J Phillips	Bryan Kellen	Heneghen	John Beuhler	Megan Mooney
2001	Dwight Slade	Dan Cummins	Ron Vaudry	Rob Little	Bradley Lewis
2002	Harrold Gomez	Rob Pue	Horace HB Sanders	David Testroet	PJ Walsh
2003	Drake Witham	Kevin Williams	Patrick Maliha	Paul Bae	Tommy Savitt
2004	Gabriel Rutledge	Jen Kober	Tony Boswell	Joe Klocek	Vic Lippucci
2005	Lamont Ferguson	Heneghen	Graham Clark	Sadiki Fuller	Andy Peters
2006	Damonde Tschritter	Paul Myrehaug	Rory Scovel	Tyler Boeh	Dylan Mandlsohn
2007	Marcus	Tony Boswell	Leif Skyving	Key Lewis	Geoff Lott
2008	Tommy Savitt	Nate Jackson	Todd Johnson	Justin Rupple	Lars Callieou
2009	Sean Kent	Paul Hooper	Travis Simmons	Jose Sarduy	Rodger Lizaola
2010	Auggie Smith	Billy Wayne Davis	Dax Jordan	Drew Barth	Eddie Pence
2011	Mike Baldwin	Rodney Sherwood	Rick Kunkler	Patrick Keane	Mrs. Hughes
2012	Michael Malone	Joe Klocek	Tyrone Hawkins	Landry	Elliot Maxx
2013	Zoltan Kaszas	Graham Kay	Trenton Davis	Dave Merheje	Rodger Lizaola
2014	Nathan Brannon	Kyle Bottom	Sterling Scott	Matt Donaher	Cory Michaelis
2015	Dino Archie	Mitch Burrow	Kortney Shane Williams	Al Park	Hans Kim
2016	Preacher Lawson	Mayce Galoni	Pat Burtscher	Ricarlo Flanagan	Billy Anderson
2017	Matt Donaher	Alex Falcone	Nick Hart	Myles Anderson	Taylor Clark
2018	Drew Dunn	Phillip Kopczynski	Landry	Bo Johnson	Harry J Riley
2019	Nancy Norton	James Hancock III	Adam Pasi	Andrew Rivers	Andrew Packer
2020	No competition due to COVID-19 pandemic				
2021	Danny Martinello	Sam Miller	Tre Tutson	Matty Litwack	Wyatt Cote
2022	Ari Matti	Chase DuRousseau	Timmy Booth	Rodger Lizaola	Mike Eshaq
2023	Brent Lowrey	Benny Nwokeabia	Mary Lou Gamba	Birungi Birungi	Jaci Terjeson
2024	Brittany Lyseng	Ola Dada	Jess Everett	Dylan Jenkins	John Gardner
2025	Tyrik Woods	Brent Ayton	Paul Goodwin	Jordan Policicchio	David Louis
