= Faris Hytiaa =

Canadian stand-up comedian

Faris Hytiaa is a Canadian stand-up comedian. He is most noted for his 2025 comedy album Homesick, for which he received a Juno Award nomination for Comedy Album of the Year at the Juno Awards of 2026.

Born in Toronto and raised in Alberta, he is of Sudanese descent.

In 2023 he released Send Help, his debut comedy special, on Telus Optik TV's Storyhive platform, and released the set in album form later that year. In 2024 he appeared in the fifth season of the CBC Gem web series The New Wave of Standup, followed up with the album Substitute Teacher Energy, and launched Homesick as his first national comedy tour.

In 2026 he appeared in the fifth season of Roast Battle Canada, battling Dino Archie.
