= Darren Frost =

Canadian actor and stand-up comedian

- Born: January 21, 1971 (age 55); Brantford, Ontario
- Occupations: Actor, stand-up comedian
- Years active: 1990s–present

Darren Frost (born January 21, 1971) is a Canadian actor and stand-up comedian from Brantford, Ontario. Commonly described as an "eccentric" or "way out" comedian whose show blends "hyper-driving criticisms, dark revelation and lunacy", he describes his aim as being "to slam a stapler against the forehead of popular culture".

He frequently performs at Yuk-Yuks comedy clubs, and he competed in the 2007 Seattle International Comedy Competition.

In 2022, Frost and Kenny Robinson undertook a double-headlining national comedy tour together. In 2026, the two appeared together in the fifth season finale of Roast Battle Canada.

Frost has also been the host of Anything Goes, a Canadian Comedy Award-nominated radio show on SiriusXM Canada.

== Filmography ==
Year	Title	Role	Notes
2000	Santa Who?	Rupert the Elf	
2000–2001	Timothy Goes to School	Frank #1	Voice
2001	Don't Say a Word	Janitor	
2002	Moville Mysteries	Emil Bornero	
2002	Duct Tape Forever	Sheriff Tompkins	
2003	Power Rangers in Space	Psycho Green	Voice
2004	Milo 55160	Bob	
2004–2010	6teen	Darth	Voice
2005	Assault on Precinct 13	Mover #1	
2005	Fever Pitch	Zach	
2005	Comedy Now!	Self	
2005–2006	Time Warp Trio	Sam	Voice
2007	Hairspray	Cameraman	
2007–2008	Bakugan Battle Brawlers	Shuji	Voice
2007–2008	Bakugan Battle Brawlers: New Vestroia	Shadow Prove	Voice
2009–2013	Stoked	Snack Shack	Voice
2010–2011	Bakugan: Gundalian Invaders	Shuji	Voice
2010–2013	Sidekick	Samy	Voice
2013–2017	Camp Lakebottom	Squirt	Voice
2013	The Ron James Show	Self	
2013	Mr. D	Norman	Five episodes
2015	Total Drama Presents: The Ridonculous Race	Chet	Voice (15 episodes)
2016–2021	Ranger Rob	Stomper	Voice
2017–2018	Wishfart	Leslie	Voice
2018–2023	Total DramaRama	Harold	Voice
2026	Roast Battle Canada	Self	Roast battle vs Kenny Robinson

== Awards ==
Award	Year	Category	Work	Result	Ref
Canadian Comedy Awards	2012	Best Radio Program or Clip	Anything Goes with Dave Martin	Nominated	
Canadian Comedy Awards	2013	Best Radio Program or Clip	Anything Goes with Dave Martin, Ron James	Nominated	
Canadian Comedy Awards	2014	Best Taped Live Performance	Emotional Terrorism	Nominated	
Canadian Comedy Awards	2014	Best Male Standup	Darren Frost	Nominated	
