= Crystal Ferrier =

Canadian stand-up comedian

Crystal Ferrier is a Canadian stand-up comedian. She is most noted for her appearances on Roast Battle Canada, for which she was a Canadian Screen Award nominee for Best Ensemble Performance in a Variety or Sketch Comedy Program or Series at the 12th Canadian Screen Awards in 2024.

Of Anglo-Indian descent, she was one of the first non-Black Canadian comedians to become a regular performer at Kenny Robinson's Nubian Show comedy nights, alongside Russell Peters and Ron Josol.
