= Jacob Samuel =

Canadian stand-up comedian

Jacob Samuel is a Canadian stand-up comedian from Vancouver, British Columbia. He is most noted for his 2020 comedy album Horse Power, which won the Juno Award for Comedy Album of the Year at the Juno Awards of 2021.

He regularly appears on the CBC Radio comedy series The Debaters, and appeared in the 2020 web series The New Wave of Standup.

In addition to his stand-up comedy work Samuel is also a cartoonist, whose work has appeared in various magazines including The New Yorker.
