= The Squeaky Wheel: Canada =

The Squeaky Wheel: Canada is a Canadian news parody comedy television series, which premiered June 24, 2024, on AMI-tv. The show is a news satire focusing on disability-related issues, adapted from Stephen Verdile's web humour publication The Squeaky Wheel.

The show stars Gaitrie Persaud and Graham Kent as anchors Arianna Salara and Grant Gewürztraminer, with reporters and sketch players including Margaret Rose, Samantha Wyss, Sivert Das, Wesley Magee-Saxton and Yousef Kadoura. Courtney Gilmour also appears as producer January Knougho, and Madison Tevlin makes a guest appearance.

Produced by Hitsby Entertainment, the series went into production in Hamilton, Ontario, in fall 2023.

The series received two Canadian Screen Award nominations at the 13th Canadian Screen Awards in 2025, for Best Sketch Comedy Program or Series and Best Ensemble Performance in a Variety or Sketch Comedy Program or Series.
