= Rebecca Strong (singer) =

Canadian singer

Rebecca Strong is a Canadian singer from Prince Albert, Saskatchewan, most noted as the fourth season winner of Canada's Got Talent.

A member of the Black Lake Denesuline First Nation, she began performing music as a child with her father in the family band Thunder and the Skydancers, and later performed with her sisters under the name Strong Sisters. She then performed regionally in Saskatchewan as a solo artist, and went viral in 2020 with a social media video of her performing Demi Lovato's song "Sober".

In 2023, she was a nominee for Fan Choice Entertainer of the Year at the Saskatchewan Indigenous Music Awards.

== Canada's Got Talent ==
On Canada's Got Talent, she first auditioned with a performance of Lovato's song "Stone Cold", receiving the golden buzzer from Lilly Singh.

In the eliminations round, she performed Olivia Rodrigo's "Drivers License", advancing to the finale.

She performed Adele's "Rolling in the Deep" in the finale.

== Awards and nominations ==
Year	Nominated work	Event	Award	Result
2024	Herself	Saskatchewan Indigenous Music Awards	Fans Choice Entertainer of the Year	Nominated
