= Tyler Morrison =

Canadian stand-up comedian

Tyler Morrison is a Canadian stand-up comedian. He is most noted for his appearances on Roast Battle Canada, for which he was a Canadian Screen Award nominee for Best Ensemble Performance in a Variety or Sketch Comedy Program or Series at the 12th Canadian Screen Awards in 2024.

Raised in Nobleton, Ontario, he is currently based in Toronto.

In 2022 he was one of the performers at the pay-per-view roast of wrestler Ric Flair. He is also cohost of the podcasts Fight Stories, about fighting in professional sports, and Main Offenders, an irreverent look at topics in current pop culture.
