= Allie Pearse =

Canadian comedian and television writer

Alexandra Pearse, known professionally as Allie Pearse, is a Canadian stand-up comedian and television writer. She is most noted for her appearances on Roast Battle Canada, for which she was a Canadian Screen Award nominee for Best Ensemble Performance in a Variety or Sketch Comedy Program or Series at the 12th Canadian Screen Awards in 2024.

She has been a writer for the television series Letterkenny and Shoresy.

She has also performed in The New Wave of Standup, and on the radio comedy series The Debaters.
