= Run Woman Run (film) =

2022 Canadian film

- Directed by: Zoe Leigh Hopkins
- Written by: Zoe Leigh Hopkins
- Produced by: P. J. Thornton; Laura Milliken; Paula Devonshire
- Starring: Dakota Ray Hebert; Asivak Koostachin
- Cinematography: Justin Black
- Edited by: Orlee Buium
- Music by: Anthony William Wallace
- Production company: Running Home Productions Inc
- Distributed by: levelFilm
- Release date: April 1, 2021 (SBIFF)
- Running time: 100 minutes
- Country: Canada
- Language: English

Run Woman Run is a 2021 Canadian drama film, written and directed by Zoe Leigh Hopkins. It stars Dakota Ray Hebert as Beck, a single mother whose life has fallen apart; when she is diagnosed with diabetes, however, she decides to pull her life back together by training to run a marathon, during which she begins to see the ghost of Tom Longboat (Asivak Koostachin) coaching and guiding her.

The cast also includes Lorne Cardinal, Braeden Clarke, Gary Farmer, Kevin Hill, Jayli Wolf, Damon Laforme, Craig Lauzon, Cody Lightning, Denise McQueen, Derek Miller, Sladen Peltier and Alex Rice.

The film premiered in April 2021 at the Santa Barbara International Film Festival. It was released theatrically in Canada by levelFILM on March 25, 2022.

== Awards ==
At the 2021 American Indian Film Festival, the film won the award for Best Film and Hebert won the award for Best Actress. Hopkins was also nominated for Best Director, Koostachin for Best Actor, Cardinal for Best Supporting Actor and Wolf for Best Supporting Actress.

The film won the Moon Jury Award at the 2021 imagineNATIVE Film and Media Arts Festival, and was named the winner of the Audience Choice award.

At the 2022 Vancouver International Women in Film Festival, it won the awards for Best Feature Film, Best Screenplay and Best Performance (Hebert).

The film was shortlisted for Best Direction in a Feature Film at the 2022 Directors Guild of Canada awards.
