= Kenny Robinson (comedian) =

Canadian comedian & actor (born 1958)

- Born: January 7, 1958 (age 68); Winnipeg, Manitoba, Canada
- Notable work: The Nubian Disciples Comedy Revue (1995–present); After Hours with Kenny Robinson (2001); Radio Free Roscoe (2003–2005)
- Awards: Now Magazine Comic of the Year (1998); Phil Hartman Award (2014)

Comedy career
- Years active: 1977–present
- Medium: Stand-up; film; television; radio
- Genres: Observational comedy; blue comedy; political satire
- Subjects: Race relations; sexuality; politics; social commentary
- Website: kennyrobinson.com

Kenny Robinson (born January 7, 1958) is a Canadian stand-up comedian, actor, and radio personality. Often referred to as the "Godfather of Canadian Comedy", he is known for his irreverent, socially conscious, and politically charged style of comedy. He is the founder of The Nubian Disciples Comedy Revue, a groundbreaking monthly showcase for Black and racialized comedians that has run at Yuk Yuk's in Toronto since 1995.

== Early life ==
Robinson was born in Winnipeg, Manitoba, on January 7, 1958, to a Black father and white mother. His father was an entertainer—a tap dancer, song-and-dance man, and drummer—who died when Robinson was nine years old. The family moved to Chicago when Robinson was one year old, and he was raised primarily there, moving back and forth between Chicago and Winnipeg throughout his youth.

== Career ==
=== Stand-up comedy ===
Robinson began his comedy career performing at an amateur night at the Royal Albert Arms in Winnipeg in April 1977, doing Humphrey Bogart impressions. After developing his act in Winnipeg, he moved to Chicago to pursue comedy, performing at venues including Zanies, The Second City, and The Comedy Womb. As a biracial comedian during an era of segregated comedy clubs, Robinson was able to perform at both "white clubs" and "black clubs" in Chicago, an experience that shaped his perspective on race and comedy.

In 1983, Robinson relocated to Toronto after meeting Dan Aykroyd on the set of The Blues Brothers, where he was working as an extra, and asking him about how to become a comedian in Canada. He began performing at the original Yuk Yuk's Komedy Kabaret on Bay Street in Yorkville and by 1984 was able to pursue comedy full-time. Mark Breslin, founder of Yuk Yuk's, encouraged Robinson to push the boundaries of his material while making use of his imagination and street wisdom.

Robinson has performed at major comedy festivals and venues across North America, including the Just for Laughs festival in Montreal, the Laffapalooza Urban Comedy Festival in Atlanta, the Winnipeg Comedy Festival, Zanies, and The Comedy Store and The Improv in Los Angeles. Over his career, he has shared the stage with comedians including Chris Rock, Dave Chappelle, Jim Carrey, Norm Macdonald, Russell Peters, Tommy Chong, Margaret Cho, Paul Mooney, and Sam Kinison.

In 1998, Robinson was named Comic of the Year by Now Magazine. In 2014, he received the Phil Hartman Award from the Canadian Comedy Awards for his outstanding lifetime contribution to Canadian comedy.

=== The Nubian Disciples Comedy Revue ===
In 1995, Robinson founded The Nubian Disciples of Pryor All-Black Comedy Revue (later shortened to The Nubian Show) at Yuk Yuk's in Toronto, recognizing that there were only about five Black comedians working in Canada at the time. The monthly showcase, held on the last Sunday of every month, was created to provide a platform for Black comedians to share their experiences with audiences, inspired by American shows like Def Comedy Jam and BET's ComicView.

The show later expanded to include other comedians of colour. Over its thirty-year history, the Nubian Show has featured performers such as Ronnie Edwards, Mista Mo, Crystal Ferrier, Gavin Stephens, Jean Paul, Keith Pedro, Dana Alexander, Keesha Brownie, and Hassan Phills, and has been attended by celebrities including Russell Peters, Dave Chappelle, Tommy Davidson, Vince Carter, Will Smith, Jada Pinkett Smith, and Vivica A. Fox. The show helped launch the career of Russell Peters, leading to his first CBC special.

In 2020, Robinson released the album Kenny Robinson's Nubian Comedy Revue: The Next 25 to celebrate the show's 25th anniversary. In 2025, the documentary People of Comedy: Celebrating 30 Years of the Nubian Show, directed by Darrell Faria, premiered on Crave to mark the show's 30th anniversary. It won the Canadian Screen Award for Best Comedy Special at the 14th Canadian Screen Awards in 2026.

=== Television and film ===
Robinson has had an extensive career in television and film. He created, wrote, produced, and hosted the late-night series After Hours with Kenny Robinson on The Comedy Network in 2001, which featured early sketch comedy appearances by Kevin Hart and Leslie Jones. His Gemini Award-nominated CBC special Thick and Thin with Ronnie Edwards earned him two nominations for writing and performance.

He played the recurring character Jellybean on the Pax TV series Doc starring Billy Ray Cyrus (2001–2004), and the recurring character Mickey Stone on the teen comedy-drama Radio Free Roscoe (2003–2005). Other television appearances include Royal Canadian Air Farce, Soul Food on Showtime, Flashpoint (2008), Private Eyes (2016), and TallBoyz (2019).

His film credits include The Third Miracle (1999) with Ed Harris, Down to Earth (2001) with Chris Rock, Love, Sex and Eating the Bones (2003), New York Minute (2004), Blue Hill Avenue (2001), and Repo Men (2010).

Robinson has also hosted the Gemini Awards. For two years, he was a co-host of The Morning Rush on CFXJ-FM (Flow 93.5), Canada's first Black-owned hip hop radio station.

== Political activity ==
In 2018, Robinson was a candidate for the Ontario Legislature in the Mississauga—Lakeshore riding, representing the None of the Above Party. He finished fifth among eight candidates.

== Personal life ==
Robinson is of Barbadian descent.

== Filmography ==
=== Film ===
Year	Title	Role	Notes
1999	The Third Miracle		
2001	Down to Earth		
2001	Blue Hill Avenue	Sam	
2003	Love, Sex and Eating the Bones		
2004	New York Minute		
2010	Repo Men		
2026	The Snake	Travis	

=== Television ===
Year	Title	Role	Notes
2001	After Hours with Kenny Robinson	Host	Creator, writer, producer; The Comedy Network
2001–2004	Doc	Jellybean	Recurring role
2003–2005	Radio Free Roscoe	Mickey Stone	Recurring role
2008	Flashpoint		
2016	Private Eyes		
2019	TallBoyz		
2026	Roast Battle Canada	Self	Season 5, Episode 8, roast battle vs. Darren Frost
