= Humour Resources =

Canadian television comedy series

- Genre: Talk show
- Created by: Jon Dore; Adam Brodie; Dave Derewlany
- Directed by: Adam Brodie; Dave Derewlany
- Starring: Jon Dore; Dan Beirne
- Country of origin: Canada
- No. of seasons: 1
- No. of episodes: 6

Production
- Production company: Just for Laughs

Original release
- Network: CBC Television
- Release: January 5 – February 9, 2021

Humour Resources is a Canadian comedy television series that premiered on CBC Television in January 2021. The series stars Jon Dore as a fictionalized version of himself, in the role of a retired comedian turned human resources manager who is conducting performance evaluation interviews with other real comedians about their strengths, weaknesses and performance benchmarks as "employees" of comedy. The series is also interspersed with scenes from his personal life, including his family life with his wife Christina Love, and his recurring interactions with a fast-food clerk at the local drive-thru (Dan Beirne) whom he considers his only real friend.

The series was created by Dore, Adam Brodie and Dave Derewlany for Just for Laughs, and was shot remotely in fall 2020 with all interviews conducted through videoconferencing due to the COVID-19 pandemic in Canada.

The series received two Canadian Screen Award nominations at the 10th Canadian Screen Awards in 2022, for Best Sketch Comedy Series and Best Performance in a Variety or Sketch Comedy Program or Series (Dore).

== Episodes ==
No.	Title	Original release date
1	"Resistance to Change"	January 5, 2021
Sarah Silverman, Courtney Gilmour, Dave Merheje.
2	"Work Life Balance"	January 12, 2021
Nikki Glaser, Casey Corbin, The Lucas Brothers.
3	"Accountability"	January 19, 2021
Tom Green, Ronny Chieng, DeAnne Smith.
4	"Conflict Resolution"	January 26, 2021
Scott Thompson, Sophie Buddle, Eric Andre.
5	"Time"	February 2, 2021
Debra DiGiovanni, Arthur Simeon, Rory Scovel.
6	"Teamwork"	February 9, 2021
Kyle Brownrigg, Aisha Brown, Nikki Glaser, Reggie Watts.
