= This Hour Has 22 Minutes Direct Hits =

Videocassette compilation

This Hour Has 22 Minutes Direct Hits is a videocassette compilation of the best bits from the Canadian television series, This Hour Has 22 Minutes, from the years of 1993–99.

The compilation features Rick Mercer "Talking to Americans", and eating burgers and fries with then-Prime Minister Jean Chrétien; Marg Delahunty (Mary Walsh) as she "smites" Mike Harris, Lucien Bouchard and Sheila Copps as "Marg, Princess Warrior"; Cathy Jones' blooper about a "Massitusits" case; Jerry Boyle (Greg Thomey) at Parliament Hill; classic ad parodies, sketch comedy, and more.

22 Minutes Direct Hits 1993–99 was produced by Salter Street Films.
