= Gary and His Demons =

- Genre: Comedy; Adult animation Animated sitcom
- Created by: Mark Little; Mark Satterthwaite
- Written by: Mark Little (season 2)
- Directed by: Mark Little & Lou Solis
- Starring: Mark Little; Kayla Lorette; Kyle Dooley; Marito Lopez; Miguel Rivas; Ned Petrie; Steph Tolev; Paloma Nunez; Julie Lemieux
- Countries of origin: United States; Canada
- Original language: English
- No. of seasons: 2
- No. of episodes: 26

Production
- Executive producers: Raja Khanna; Mark Little; Mark Satterthwaite; for Mondo Media: Wendy Wilis; Pia Chikiamco; Greg Franklin; Andy Fieder; John Evershed
- Producers: Josh Bowen; creative producer: Stephanie Kaliner
- Running time: 11 minutes
- Production companies: Mondo Media; Solis Animation; Look Mom! Productions; Blue Ant Media

Original release
- Network: VRV (season 1); Freevee (season 2)
- Release: April 15, 2018 – October 6, 2022

Gary and His Demons is an adult animated sitcom created by Mark Little and co-created by Mark Satterthwaite for Mondo Media's channel on VRV. The series follows a cantankerous, aging demon slayer who has nothing left to lose. Burdened by his Chosen One status and backed by a team of specialists he can't relate to, Gary struggles to keep interest in the Earth-saving duty he never asked for and doesn't want.

Both seasons are directed by Mark Little and Louis Solis, and are primarily written by Little. The voice cast includes Little as Gary, Kayla Lorette as Leslie, Kyle Dooley as Hanley, Marito Lopez as Marito, and Miguel Rivas in various roles.

On April 13, 2022, it was announced there would be a second season and the series moved to Amazon Prime Video in Canada. Season 2 was released on October 6, 2022. In the United States, the second season was released on Freevee on July 7, 2023.

== Premise ==
The series opens on aging Gary, a demon hunter struggling to stay interested in the Earth-saving duty he never asked for and doesn't want, as he chases what he thinks is his last demon. After a disappointing failed capture resulting in him injuring an innocent homeless boy, Gary returns to the Demon Ministry to attend his own retirement party — his second retirement party in thirty years since Chosen One status is only meant to last fifteen years. Shortly after an underwhelming retirement speech, his boss, Leslie, reveals to him that they've once again failed to find his replacement, and she asks him to serve one more term as Chosen One — which would mean fighting until he turns 60. The show revolves around Gary's adventures in demon hunting while also dealing with the frustration of being unable to retire.

== Cast and characters ==
Overview

| Character | | Voiced by | Seasons | |
| Character | | Voiced by | Book 1 | Book 2 |
| Character | | Voiced by | 2018 | 2023 |
Main characters
| Gary | The Chosen One | Mark Little | Main | Main |
| Leslie | | Kayla Lorette | Main | Main |
| Marito | | Marito Lopez | Main | Main |
| Hanley | | Kyle Dooley | Main | Main |
| Gargnel | | Kyle Dooley | Recurring | Main |
| Fleshler | | Chris Wilson | Guest | Main |
| Tucker / Ryndok | The Chosen One | Tim Gilbert | Guest | Main |
| Prophetess Vale | | Kayla Lorette | | Main |
| Mudge | | Kayla Lorette | | Main |
| Larry | | Ryan Beil | | Main |
Recurring characters
| Steve | | David Berni | Recurring | Recurring |
| Michaela / Mikaela | | Sara Garcia | Recurring | Recurring |
| Various | | Miguel Rivas | Recurring | Recurring |
| Various | | Paloma Nuñez | Recurring | Recurring |
| Various | | Ned Petrie | Recurring | Recurring |
| Gary's Mom | | Julie Lemieux | Recurring | Guest |
| Gary's Dad | | Ron Pardo | Recurring | Guest |
| Bloody Mary | | Emma Hunter | Recurring | |
| Steph | | Steph Tolev | Recurring | |

== Production ==
=== Improvisation ===
Improvisation plays a heavy role in recording the show, and the final product is a marriage of the script and improvisation. The creative team has said that they include as many improvisers in recording as possible.

=== Animation ===
Animation director Louis Solis has said that the team used Flash to animate the show, saying that it provides the best way to capture the improvisational spirit of the show.

== Episodes ==
=== Season 1 (2018) ===
| No. overall | No. in season | Title | Written by | Original release date |
|---|---|---|---|---|
| 1 | 1 | "Still the One" | Mark Little & Mark Satterthwaite | April 15, 2018 |
After thirty years on the job as a demon hunter, Gary is looking forward to retirement. But when his boss reveals they still haven't found a new chosen one, Gary tries to take matters into his own hands.
| 2 | 2 | "Grundleman" | Mark Little & Mark Satterthwaite | April 22, 2018 |
Gary and Hanley must battle with the new mirror monster Grundleman, which dredges up some disturbing memories from Hanley's past.
| 3 | 3 | "Fleshler '99" | Mark Little | April 29, 2018 |
When Gary finds out that a demon named Fleshler might still be alive — despite Gary killing him years ago — he recounts to Hanley the story behind the death of his true love, Janine.
| 4 | 4 | "Gary Goes Home" | Stephanie Kaliner | May 6, 2018 |
Gary goes home and must confront a horror unlike any other — a family dinner with his parents and annoyingly perfect brother Steve.
| 5 | 5 | "Guy on the Tiger" | Mark Little | May 13, 2018 |
Gary forms a bond with a tiger after it saves him from a demon but when the tiger starts exhibiting demonic behavior, Gary is faced with a difficult choice.
| 6 | 6 | "Leslie and Her Demons" | Mark Little | May 20, 2018 |
Gary tries to help his usually uptight boss Leslie confront her issues, unknowingly unleashing her inner demons.
| 7 | 7 | "Gary and His Niece" | Stephanie Kaliner | May 27, 2018 |
When Gary spends a day with his niece, he realizes his demon hunting skills are no match for the terrors that can be inflicted by a teenage girl.
| 8 | 8 | "Gary Goes Back to School" | Mark Little | June 3, 2018 |
When teenagers start overdosing on a new demon-derived drug, Gary goes undercover at a high school to find the culprit.
| 9 | 9 | "Gary and His Love Life" | Stephanie Kaliner | July 8, 2018 |
The anniversary of his fiancee's death has Gary more down in the dumps than usual, but a chance encounter with a friend may be just what the doctor ordered...or not.
| 10 | 10 | "Gary and His Vacation" | Mark Little | July 15, 2018 |
When Gary and Hanley head to an island resort to hunt down a demon, Gary is determined to turn it into a vacation despite the fact that trouble lurks everywhere — even in paradise.
| 11 | 11 | "Heavy Metal" | Mark Little & Mark Satterthwaite | July 22, 2018 |
A case concerning a possessed teen leads Gary and Hanley to suspect that a heavy metal band's music is to blame — only to discover that the rockers are not what they seem.
| 12 | 12 | "Gary and His Brother" | Stephanie Kaliner | July 29, 2018 |
When Steve's wife throws him out, he ends up staying with Gary and they try to build the fraternal relationship they never had. However, it doesn't take long for old sibling rivalries to rear their ugly head.
| 13 | 13 | "Gary the Bodyguard" | Stephanie Kaliner | August 5, 2018 |
Despite his moral objections, Gary is assigned to guard a famous demon porn star who's received a death threat. But as he gets to know the demon, Gary finds himself questioning his previous assumptions and prejudices.
| 14 | 14 | "The Seven" | Mark Little | August 12, 2018 |
Gary and Leslie head to Japan for the annual gathering of the world's demon hunters, but Gary is in for the surprise of his life when he realizes all his old cohorts have retired — replaced by bright-eyed and bushy-tailed teenagers.
| 15 | 15 | "Gary and His Birthday" | Stephanie Kaliner | August 19, 2018 |
At a restaurant to celebrate his birthday, Gary thinks his teenage waiter could be the new chosen one. Nobody buys it, but Gary is determined to prove this kid is his replacement so he can finally retire.
| 16 | 16 | "Gary and His New Life" | Mark Little | August 26, 2018 |
Despite having finally retired from demon hunting, Gary still finds himself unhappy and without purpose. But when he receives news that a powerful demon from his past has returned and is making threats, Gary finds his resolve and decides to return for one last fight.

=== Season 2 (2022) ===
| No. overall | No. in season | Title | Original release date |
|---|---|---|---|
| 17 | 1 | "Still, Still the One" | October 6, 2022 |
Gary must carry the ministry and the world on his shoulders since Tucker is out of action; the newest addition to the team fails to make the work any easier.
| 18 | 2 | "Tucker's Angels" | October 6, 2022 |
Tucker's fans turn up the heat; Gary must make amends for an act of selfishness.
| 19 | 3 | "Fleshler Reborn" | October 6, 2022 |
Gary is upset with the ministry over his nemesis's new lease on life; a biological mishap befalls Gary and brings a demon baby into his chaotic world.
| 20 | 4 | "Forest of Despair" | October 6, 2022 |
Tuckered out with his burdensome role in the scheme of everything, Gary joins a group of world-weary demons in the woods to find some peace and quiet.
| 21 | 5 | "Home for Fleshler" | October 6, 2022 |
Gary is willing to do whatever it takes to find a new family for the baby demon.
| 22 | 6 | "The Investor" | October 6, 2022 |
The ministry's future depends on Leslie, Gary and Tucker's meeting with a potential investor. There is no room for slip-ups.
| 23 | 7 | "The Imaginary Friend" | October 6, 2022 |
Gary must do whatever it takes to help Leslie get rid of her daughter's imaginary friend.
| 24 | 8 | "The Prophetess Vale" | October 6, 2022 |
Intent on destroying all of humankind, the Prophetess Vale takes one last stab at leading the Demon Revolution; executing a plan to free the Evil Book from the Ministry's vaults won't be easy, however.
| 25 | 9 | "Ryndok" | October 6, 2022 |
An unfortunate turn of events sets a demon revolution in motion and leaves the world at the mercy of Ryndok; Gary struggles with a physiological problem.
| 26 | 10 | "The Door" | October 6, 2022 |
It doesn't look good for humankind as the Demon Revolution continues and the end is nigh. Gary has a very sore back and looks to the rest of his team for help in defeating Ryndok.

== Release ==
The first season was streamed weekly on VRV in the United States between April 15 and August 26, 2018. The show had its linear television debut on April 20, 2019 on Syfy as part of its TZGZ block. It was also aired on El Rey Network as part of the Mondo Animation Hour. The second season was released on Freevee on July 7, 2023.

In Canada, the series was streamed on CBC Gem in October 2018. That same month, Comedy Central began airing the series in the United Kingdom. In Australia, the series was added to ABC iView in November 2018 and premiered on ABC Comedy.
