= Paul Rabliauskas =

Canadian actor and comedian

Paul Rabliauskas is a Canadian stand-up comedian, most noted as the star of the 2022 sitcom Acting Good.

Rabliauskas, of mixed Anishinaabe and Lithuanian descent, is a member of the Poplar River First Nation.

He began his comedy career in the late 2000s, and has appeared at the Just for Laughs festival, on the CBC Radio comedy debate series The Debaters, and in the CBC Gem stand-up comedy web series The New Wave of Standup.

Forced to move from Winnipeg back to Poplar River to stay with his family during the COVID-19 pandemic due to the reduction of his stand-up comedy income, he created and hosted Paul Anishinaabemo (Paul Speaks Ojibwe), a podcast in which his mother teaches him the Ojibwe language. He also created and wrote Acting Good, a sitcom based on his experiences returning to the community, which premiered on CTV Comedy Channel in October 2022.

He appeared in a third season episode of Roast Battle Canada, competing against Dakota Ray Hebert.
