= Juno Award for Comedy Album of the Year =

Canadian music award

The Juno Award for Comedy Album of the Year is awarded as recognition for the best Canadian comedy album released in the previous year. Irregularly presented from 1979 to 1984, the award was then discontinued until the Juno Awards announced in 2017 that they would revive the category for the Juno Awards of 2018.

== Winners and nominees ==
| Year | Winner(s) | Album | Nominees | Ref. |
|---|---|---|---|---|
| 1979 | Royal Canadian Air Farce | The Air Farce Comedy Album | Alden Diehl, Fight On; Nestor Pistor, Best of Nestor Pistor; Nestor Pistor, Nestor Pistor for Prime Minister; Nancy White, Civil Service Songwriter | |
| 1980 | Rich Little | A Christmas Carol | Al Clouston, Cinderelly; Steve Ivings, Steve's Record; Eric Peterson, Billy Bishop Goes to War; Nestor Pistor, Nestor Pistor | |
Award not presented in 1981
| 1982 | Bob & Doug McKenzie | The Great White North | Don Harron, Charlie Farquharson's Bible Stories; John Stark, An Evening with Stephen Leacock; Ted Woloshyn, It's Not the Heat...It's the Humility | |
Award not presented in 1983
| 1984 | Bob & Doug McKenzie | Strange Brew | Al Clouston, Laugh to Your Heart's Delight; MacLean & MacLean, Go to Hell; Royal Canadian Air Farce, Air Farce Live | |
Award not presented 1985-2018
| 2018 | Ivan Decker | I Wanted to Be a Dinosaur | Charlie Demers, Fatherland; D.J. Demers, [Indistinct Chatter]; K. Trevor Wilson, Sorry! (A Canadian Album); Rebecca Kohler, In Living Kohler | |
| 2019 | Dave Merheje | Good Friend Bad Grammar | Debra DiGiovanni, Lady Jazz; Mayce Galoni, Awkwarder; Chanty Marostica, The Chanty Show; Pat Thornton, Chicken! | |
| 2020 | Sophie Buddle | Lil Bit of Buddle | Jarrett Campbell, Straight White Fail; Adam Christie, General Anxiety Disorder; Monty Scott, The Abyss Stares Back; Steph Tolev, I'm Not Well | |
| 2021 | Jacob Samuel | Horse Power | Shirley Gnome, Decoxification; Nick Nemeroff, The Pursuit of Comedy Has Ruined My Life; Derek Seguin, PanDerek (1st Wave!); Matt Wright, Existing Is Exhausting | |
| 2022 | Andrea Jin | Grandma's Girl | Seán Devlin, Airports, Animals; Hisham Kelati, Tigre King; Keith Pedro, Trillipino; Gavin Stephens, All Inclusive Coma | |
| 2023 | Jon Dore | A Person Who Is Gingerbread | Zabrina Douglas, Things Black Girls Say: The Album; Courtney Gilmour, Let Me Hold Your Baby; Jackie Pirico, Splash Pad; Matt Wright, Here Live, Not a Cat | |
| 2024 | Kyle Brownrigg | A Lylebility | Graham Clark, Never Was; Laurie Elliott, Sexiest Fish in the Lake; Mae Martin, SAP; Derek Seguin, Life of Leisure | |
| 2025 | Debra DiGiovanni | Honourable Intentions | Ivan Decker, Popcorn; Courtney Gilmour, Wonder Woman; Nathan Macintosh, Down with Tech; Jess Salomon, Sad Witch | |
| 2026 | Adam Christie | Dragonflies | Charlie Demers, Fish from the Jar; Robby Hoffman, I'm Nervous; Faris Hytiaa, Homesick; Dave Merheje, Dawud | |
