= Acting Good =

Canadian comedy television series

- Genre: Comedy
- Created by: Paul Rabliauskas; Amber-Sekowan Daniels; Eric Toth; Pat Thornton
- Country of origin: Canada
- Original language: English
- No. of seasons: 4
- No. of episodes: 40

Production
- Producers: Tina Keeper; Jennifer Beasley
- Production companies: Kistikan Pictures Inc.; Canada Media Fund; Bell Fund; APTN; The Indigenous Screen Office; Manitoba Film & Music

Original release
- Network: CTV Comedy Channel; APTN
- Release: October 17, 2022 – December 14, 2026

Acting Good is a Canadian television comedy series that premiered on October 17, 2022, on CTV Comedy Channel. It was the top-rated program on the channel in its first season. The second season premiered on October 16, 2023.

In October 2026 CTV announced that the series will end after its fifth season, with the series finale slated to air on December 14.

== Premise ==
The series stars comedian Paul Rabliauskas as a young First Nations man who returns home to live in his small reserve community in northern Manitoba following a failed attempt to establish himself in Winnipeg. The series is loosely based around his own experiences having to move back home to live with his family during the COVID-19 pandemic in Canada.

In the second season, Paul finds that Rose and Agnes have shut him out. With nowhere else to go, Paul decides to move into the elder's lodge. Jo decides to run for chief of Grouse Lake First Nation against Chief Deedee, but faces opposition from Cousin Leon.

The third season sees Paul and Rose attempt to start a family after Rose left Stephen Harper at the altar to be with Paul. Jo juggles between raising her daughter and her obligations as chief, while Dean and Greg learn how to run their own community store.

== Cast ==
=== Main ===
The main cast for Acting Good, from left to right: Lips, Rose, Chickadee, Jo, Paul, Agnes, Dean, and Roger.

- Paul Rabliauskas as Paul Bittern, the owner of the Sagatay Lodge. Paul moves back to Grouse Lake after a botched attempt at moving to Winnipeg. Spoiled by his mother Agnes, Paul is sensitive and petty, displaying momma's boy tendencies.
- Roseanne Supernault as Josephine "Jo" Bittern, Paul's sister who works at the band office as band councillor and later chief of Grouse Lake. She is often picking up the work that Chief Deedee neglects, eventually running for chief herself in the second season.
- Tina Keeper as Agnes Bittern, Paul's mother and the matriarch of the family. She works at the North Store with entrepreneurial tendencies. Set in her ways and prone to gossip, she serves as a source of wisdom for Paul.
- Gabriel Daniels as Dean, Paul's cousin who is also Paul's best friend. Dean lives in a converted bus where he sells DVDs to the townsfolk as the town's "movie man", later starting his own business alongside Logan.
- Cheyenna Sapp as Rose, Paul's on-and-off again girlfriend. She is an influencer specializing in makeup and works as a receptionist at the band office. When she is not in a relationship with Paul, she is with Stephen Harper.
- Billy Merasty as Roger Laughingstick, radio DJ and narrator. Described as the "voice of the rez", Laughingstick is confident in his skills and previously worked as a radio host in Winnipeg.
- Avery Sutherland as Chickadee Bittern, Olivia Sinclair as a younger Chickadee, Jo's rebellious daughter. Described as "cool, rebellious and answers to no-one" and with a self-sufficiency that leads people to see her more as a cool uncle.
- Jason Mason as Lips, Jo's right hand man and the sole band constable at Grouse Lake.

=== Recurring ===
- Pat Thornton as Brady (main in season 1), manager of the North Store and has a crush on Jo. Brady had a tumultuous previous relationship with his ex-wife who would film YouTube prank videos at his expense.
- Michael Greyeyes as Cousin Leon, nobody's actual cousin who was banned from the reserve for ten years and has a habit of rummaging through others' belongings. He returns to Grouse Lake as his ban expires, later mounting a populist campaign for chief against Jo.
- Aqqalu Meekis as Stephen Harper, Rose's on and off again boyfriend. Named after the Prime Minister of the same name, Harper is the "seemingly nicest guy on the rez".
- Vern Coot Bird as Ed, an elderly man who is involved in various shenanigans on the reserve.
- Erik Athavale as Greg (guest in season 2, recurring in season 3), the son of the North Store's owner. He quits his position of manager in the second season to pursue starting his own business with Dean.
- James Siegers as James (Sad Kid, S2 EP8) a youth who appears mostly alongside "Blue" and has done many odd jobs for community members.
- Jesse Nobess as Logan (guest season 1 and 2, recurring season 3), the reserve's visiting nurse who is outspoken regarding his critique of the diet of the locals. In the third season, Logan and Jo enter a relationship.
- Julia Ulayok Davis as Serena Buttern, an ASMR online influencer whose family has been feuding with the Bitterns, she enters a relationship with Chickadee.
- Wanda Barker as Rita, an elder who lives in the Elder's lodge and Agnes' bingo rival. Sophia Smoke and Tavis Hardisty play Sophia and Tavis respectively, other elders who join in on Agnes and Rita's plan to disconnect the reserve's Wi-Fi.
- Tracey Nepinak as Hilda, an elder who lives in the Elder's lodge, an ex-con who still retains some of her past criminal tendencies.
- Rosanna Deerchild as Chief Deedee, the absentminded chief of Grouse Lake. A passionate player of electric guitar, she was the lead singer of Big Makwa, her former band.
- Jonathan Beardy as Blue, a local youth who enjoys freezies that stain his mouth blue.
- Joyce Delaronde as Mavis "Beanpole" McKay, Jo's rival.
- Remington Louie as Tatanka, the Indigenous love interest for Bernice in Rose's soap opera, who appears more interested in his horse, Comanche, than he is with her. Sydney Sabiston as Bernice, Tatanka's love interest in Rose's soap opera.
- Ian Ross as Principal Sweetley, Paul and Chickadee's summer school teacher and principal of the school. Sweetley has a contentious relationship with Paul, due to the latter's pranks, and threatens to expel him several times.
- Ashley Callingbull as Gale, a Cree barge captain. She and Dean enter a temporary relationship, but does not commit because she is "married to the sea."
- Victoria Turko as Ducky McKay, Paul's love interest with a reputation for locals only having one shot at a relationship with her.
- Kevin McDonald as Tobin, Paul's white father who was away from home for long stretches of time as a birdwatcher.
- Darlene Naponse as Dr. Tenderfeather, an author whose books on relationships are frequently cited.

== Episodes ==
=== Series overview ===
Season	Episodes	Originally released	
Season	Episodes	First released	Last released
1	10	October 17, 2022	December 19, 2022
2	10	October 16, 2023	December 18, 2023
3	10	October 21, 2024	December 16, 2024
4	10	October 20, 2025	December 15, 2025

=== Season 1 (2022) ===
No. overall	No. in season	Title	Directed by	Written by	Original release date	Canada viewers (millions)
1	1	"Just Fok’n Missing Her"	Unknown	Unknown	October 17, 2022	N/A
2	2	"Goosed by a Moose"	Unknown	Unknown	October 24, 2022	N/A
3	3	"Three Nobodies"	Unknown	Unknown	October 31, 2022	N/A
4	4	"High Rollers"	Unknown	Unknown	November 7, 2022	N/A
5	5	"A Steps Too Far"	Unknown	Unknown	November 17, 2022	N/A
6	6	"Battle in the Bush"	Unknown	Unknown	November 21, 2022	N/A
7	7	"Under the “B” for Breakup"	Unknown	Unknown	November 28, 2022	N/A
8	8	"Fresh Meat"	Unknown	Unknown	December 5, 2022	N/A
9	9	"Mr. Witch Face"	Unknown	Unknown	December 12, 2022	N/A
10	10	"The Jig is Up"	Unknown	Unknown	December 19, 2022	N/A

=== Season 2 (2023) ===
No. overall	No. in season	Title	Directed by	Written by	Original release date	Canada viewers (millions)
11	1	"One Flew Out of The Kookum's Nest"	Unknown	Unknown	October 16, 2023	N/A
12	2	"To Catch a Rummager"	Unknown	Unknown	October 23, 2023	N/A
13	3	"Fasting and Furious"	Unknown	Unknown	October 30, 2023	N/A
14	4	"L'il Tonys in the Mist"	Unknown	Unknown	November 6, 2023	N/A
15	5	"The Flighting Grouse"	Unknown	Unknown	November 13, 2023	N/A
16	6	"Roger That"	Unknown	Unknown	November 20, 2023	N/A
17	7	"One Point for the Road"	Unknown	Unknown	November 27, 2023	N/A
18	8	"Dabs of Thunder"	Unknown	Unknown	December 4, 2023	N/A
19	9	"The Wolf of Paul Street"	Unknown	Unknown	December 11, 2023	N/A
20	10	"A Man for All Shack-Up Seasons"	Unknown	Unknown	December 18, 2023	N/A

=== Season 3 (2024) ===
No. overall	No. in season	Title	Directed by	Written by	Original release date	Canada viewers (millions)
21	1	""The Keemootch Room""	Unknown	Unknown	October 21, 2024	N/A
22	2	"Baby Daddy Games"	Unknown	Unknown	October 21, 2024	N/A
23	3	"The Reverse Moo"	Unknown	Unknown	October 28, 2024	N/A
24	4	"Grouse Lake Grouse Break"	Unknown	Unknown	November 4, 2024	N/A
25	5	"Bitterns VS Butterns"	Unknown	Unknown	November 11, 2024	N/A
26	6	"The Scourge of The Screen"	Unknown	Unknown	November 18, 2024	N/A
27	7	"Secret Lies and Meatballs"	Unknown	Unknown	November 25, 2024	N/A
28	8	"Pretty Fly(For a White Dad)"	Unknown	Unknown	December 2, 2024	N/A
29	9	"Paul In, Paul Out"	Unknown	Unknown	December 9, 2024	N/A
30	10	"Oh Ho'leh Night"	Unknown	Unknown	December 16, 2024	N/A

=== Season 4 (2025) ===
No. overall	No. in season	Title	Directed by	Written by	Original release date	Canada viewers (millions)
31	1	"A Diamond in The Bush"	Unknown	Unknown	October 20, 2025	N/A
32	2	"Mean Dads"	Unknown	Unknown	October 20, 2025	N/A
33	3	"The Burnouts"	Unknown	Unknown	October 27, 2025	N/A
34	4	"Bed on Arrival"	Unknown	Unknown	November 3, 2025	N/A
35	5	"Indecent Paul’Posal"	Unknown	Unknown	November 10, 2025	N/A
36	6	"The Cúck Came Back"	Unknown	Unknown	November 17, 2025	N/A
37	7	"Thirst Trap"	Unknown	Unknown	November 24, 2025	N/A
38	8	"The Spy Who Snagged Me"	Unknown	Unknown	December 1, 2025	N/A
39	9	"Meeting of The Minds"	Unknown	Unknown	December 8, 2025	N/A
40	10	"Dirty Deed"	Unknown	Unknown	December 15, 2025	N/A

== Production ==
Directors include Michael Greyeyes and Darlene Naponse. The series is produced by Kistikan Pictures.
