= Courtney Gilmour =

Canadian stand-up comedian (born 1986)

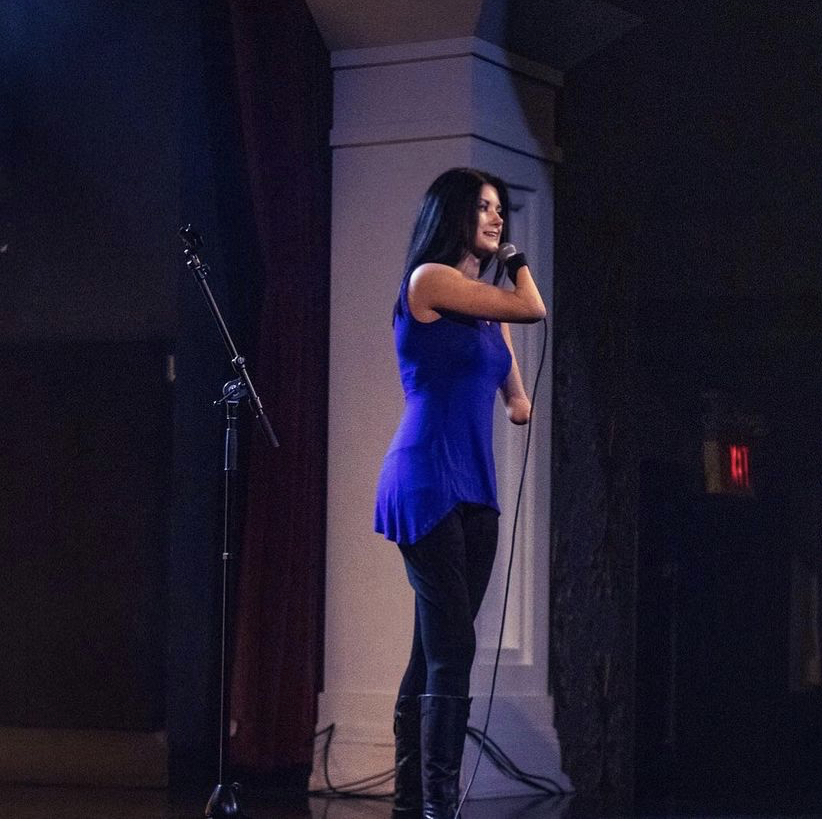
- Gilmour performing at The Great Hall in Toronto
- Born: Sarnia, Ontario, Canada
- Education: University of Windsor

Comedy career
- Medium: Stand-up; television; film
- Genres: Observational comedy; sketch comedy; surreal humor; satire
- Subjects: Amputees; disability; everyday life; social awkwardness; religion; pop culture
- Website: Official website

Courtney Gilmour (born 1984)is a Canadian stand-up comedian, whose performances centre on her experiences as a congenital triple amputee. She is most noted as the joint winner with D.J. Mausner of the annual Homegrown Comics competition for emerging Canadian comedians at the 2017 Just for Laughs festival.

Born in Sarnia, Ontario, and raised in Waterloo, Gilmour was born without forearms and with only one leg. She began pursuing comedy while studying at the University of Windsor.

Following her Homegrown Comics win, she performed in 2018 at the Winnipeg Comedy Festival and the Halifax Comedy Festival. In 2019 she premiered the one-woman stage show Congratulations at the Toronto Fringe Festival.

In 2021 she appeared as herself in an episode of Jon Dore's CBC comedy series Humour Resources. She has also appeared in The Beaverton, The Stand-Up Show with Katherine Ryan, The Squeaky Wheel: Canada and the web series Space Dragon and Kim.

In 2022, she competed in the second season of Canada's Got Talent and was announced on April 26, 2022, as advancing to the semi-final round. She later won the judges' vote to advance to the finale. She also appeared in two episodes of the second season of Roast Battle Canada.

She voices the character Lizzy in the animated children’s series PAW Patrol and in 2025 it was announced that she has joined the cast of Trailer Park Boys in their upcoming season 13.

Her comedy album Let Me Hold Your Baby received a Juno Award nomination for Comedy Album of the Year at the Juno Awards of 2023. In the same year, she was featured in a third-season episode of The New Wave of Standup.

Her second album, Wonder Woman, was nominated for a Juno Award for Comedy Album of the Year at the Juno Awards of 2025.
