= Ola Dada =

Canadian stand-up comedian

Ola Dada is a Canadian stand-up comedian, most noted as a finalist in the 2019 SiriusXM Top Comic competition.

Born in Nigeria, Dada moved to Canada at the age of 10, and spent his teen years living in Fort McMurray, Alberta. He moved to Vancouver, British Columbia to study accounting, and worked in banks before pursuing stand-up comedy in local Vancouver comedy clubs.

In 2020, he was featured in the CBC Gem stand-up comedy web series The New Wave of Standup. In 2022 he was a competitor in the second season of Canada's Got Talent, making the semifinals, and released his debut comedy album Dada Plan.
