= Nick Nemeroff =

Canadian stand-up comedian (1989–2022)

- Born: December 28, 1989; Canada
- Died: June 27, 2022 (aged 32)
- Occupation: Comedian
- Years active: 2010s–2022

Nick Nemeroff (December 28, 1989 – June 27, 2022) was a Canadian stand-up comedian. He was most noted for his 2020 comedy album The Pursuit of Comedy Has Ruined My Life, which was a Juno Award nominee for Comedy Album of the Year at the Juno Awards of 2021.

== Career ==
Originally from Montreal, Quebec, Nemeroff appeared on Conan and on The Comedy Network's 2018 Homegrown Comics special, and has performed at Just for Laughs, the Winnipeg Comedy Festival, and the Halifax Comedy Festival. He was a Canadian Comedy Award nominee for Best Breakout Artist at the 18th Canadian Comedy Awards in 2018.

In 2022, he appeared in the CBC Gem web series The New Wave of Standup, and in two episodes of Roast Battle Canada.

On June 27, 2022, Nemeroff died at the age of 32. The news, which was confirmed by his family and management company in statements posted to social media, did not detail his cause of death, but his manager, Morgan Flood, indicated in a text message to CBC that he "died in his sleep."

== Legacy ==
In June 2023, the Academy of Canadian Cinema and Television announced the creation of a memorial grant in Nemeroff's name which will provide emerging stand-up comedians with $10,000 to fund the production of a comedy project such as a television special or an album.

Since his death, all subsequent seasons of Roast Battle Canada have been advertised as being dedicated to his memory.
