= Robert Watson (comedian) =

Canadian writer and comedian

Robert Watson is a Canadian writer and comedian, originally from Victoria, British Columbia and currently based in Toronto, Ontario. He is most noted as the creator and writer of the comedy web series A Gay Victorian Affair, and as the organizer of Gay AF events for LGBTQ stand-up comedians.

== Background ==
Watson began his career in Toronto theatre, with playwriting credits including Chasing Margaret Flatwood, Desperate Housepets, The Money Tree and Birds of a Feather.

He has been a two-time Dora Mavor Moore Award nominee for Outstanding New Play, Theatre for Young Audiences, for The Money Tree in 2015 and Birds of a Feather in 2017.

He has also had occasional film and television acting roles, including small parts in episodes of Queer as Folk and Billable Hours, and the short films Mindgames and Eye of the Veil.

== A Gay Victorian Affair ==
In 2018 Watson and his theatre colleague Andrew Lamb collaborated on the comedy web series A Gay Victorian Affair. Described as a cross between Downton Abbey and Queer as Folk, the series starred Adrian Proszowski and Amanda Barker as Lord Reginald and Lady Vanessa Favershum, a British noble couple in the Victorian era who enter a lavender marriage in order to hide their homosexuality from public view, while getting up to gay hijinks behind closed doors. In addition to writing and producing the series, Watson had a supporting role as Henry, the Favershums' butler.

The series was released to YouTube in 2018.

The series swept all four Canadian Comedy Awards categories for web content at the 19th Canadian Comedy Awards in 2019, winning Best Web Series, Best Performance in a Web Series (Barker), Best Writing in a Web Series (Watson) and Best Direction in a Web Series (Lamb).

== Stand-up comedy ==
In 2021 he released the comedy special Out for Laughs on Amazon Prime Video and OutTV, and in 2023 he released his debut comedy album, Homo Say What?.

Watson launched Gay AF in 2019. Initially a monthly showcase for local LGBTQ stand-up comedians at Comedy Bar, the show later expanded to present comedy performances at regional LGBTQ Pride festivals in Southern Ontario, an annual special show at Buddies in Bad Times for Pride Toronto, sold-out shows at Montreal's Zoofest in 2023 and 2024, and an 11-city national tour in 2024, which was hosted by Watson and headlined by Ava Val, but otherwise featured a different lineup of local comedians in each city.
