= Kyle Brownrigg =

Canadian stand-up comedian

Kyle Brownrigg is a Canadian stand-up comedian, most noted for winning the Juno Award for Comedy Album of the Year at the Juno Awards of 2024 for his comedy album A Lylebility.

Originally from Ottawa, Brownrigg began his career at open mic comedy nights in Ottawa. He later moved to Toronto, where he is a regular performer at comedy clubs and shows. He has also performed as a touring comic, at events such as Just for Laughs, JFL Northwest, the Halifax Comedy Festival, the Sudbury Comedy Festival, the 905 Comedy Festival, We're Funny That Way! and the Icebreakers Comedy Festival. He was featured in the 2018 HBO Canada special Homegrown Comics, and the 2020 CBC Gem special The New Wave of Standup, and has appeared on CBC Radio's comedy debate series The Debaters.

In 2018 he was a finalist in SiriusXM Canada's annual Top Comic competition. He released his first comedy album, Unmedicated: The New Fragrance, in 2019. In the same year, he won the Canadian Comedy Award for Best Breakout Artist at the 19th Canadian Comedy Awards.

In 2021, he appeared in an episode of Jon Dore's comedy series Humour Resources. In 2022, his full-length comedy special Kyle Brownrigg: Introducing Lyle, recorded at the 2021 Just for Laughs festival, premiered on Crave. In 2022 he appeared in two episodes of Roast Battle Canada.

Brownrigg is openly gay. The initial news of his Juno nomination came just one day after he had reluctantly decided to leave stand-up comedy due to the challenges of pursuing it as an openly gay comedian, with Brownrigg opining that "it's kind of weird how the universe pulls you back in". His stand-up comedy routine often draws on "Lyle", his name for a loud and obnoxious aspect of his personality that comes out when he drinks alcohol, with one of his most famous "Lyle" stories revolving around a television reporter for CP24 who once asked him about the Toronto Pride parade in a live on-the-street spot.
