= Peter McBain =

Canadian comedian and writer

Peter McBain is a Canadian comedian and writer. He has written for CBC's This Hour Has 22 Minutes and The Hour. He has won three Canadian Comedy Awards as a writer for This Hour Has 22 Minutes (Best TV Writing - Season in 2001 and 2002 and Best TV Writing - Special or Episode in 2003) as well as a Writers Guild of Canada Award in 2002, and a Gemini Award nomination in 2004.
