= Canada's Got Talent season 4 =

Canada's Got Talent
- Season 4
- Promotional poster for season 4, featuring (L to R) judges Stratus, Offishall, Mandel, host Ell, and Singh
- Hosted by: Lindsay Ell
- Judges: Kardinal Offishall; Trish Stratus; Lilly Singh; Howie Mandel
- Winner: Rebecca Strong
- Runners-up: Funkanometry; Eshan Sobti
- No. of episodes: 9

Release
- Original network: Citytv
- Original release: March 19 – May 14, 2024

Season chronology
- ← Previous; Season 3 Next → Season 5

The fourth season of the Canadian talent show competition series Canada's Got Talent premiered on March 19, 2024.

The season was won by Rebecca Strong, a singer from Prince Albert, Saskatchewan.

== Format ==
=== Auditions ===
The auditions took place in front of the judges and a live audience. At any time during the audition, the judges showed their disapproval of the act by pressing a buzzer, which lights a large red "X" on the stage. If all the judges pressed their buzzers, the act must end. Voting worked on a majority-of-three basis, where three positive votes from the judges were required. The Golden Buzzer is placed in the center of the stage, and each judge (or the host) can only press the Golden Buzzer once, sending an act straight to the eliminations.

=== Eliminations ===
The elimination round and final were broadcast through two episodes. Judges could still end a performance early with four Xs. The acts competed for three judge votes that sent them straight to the finals, and the rest competed for a Canada-wide vote that dictated the rest of the finalists. The judges were asked to express their views on each act's performance. Phone lines, Twitter, Facebook, texting and online voting platforms opened for one-hour after all acts were performed. The public voted for the act they thought was the best. Voters could submit a total of fifty votes (ten in each platform). After the votes were counted, the act that polled the highest number of public votes, automatically was placed in the final. The judges then chose between the second and third most popular acts, with the winner of that vote also gaining a place in the final. All other acts were then eliminated from the competition.

=== The Finals ===
The acts who made it through the Eliminations have a final shot at performing once again, and all of the acts competed for a Canada-wide vote that determined the winner of the season. This round has been broadcast live, and the winner is revealed at the end of the episode.

== Judges and host ==
Judges for Canada's Got Talent (season 4)

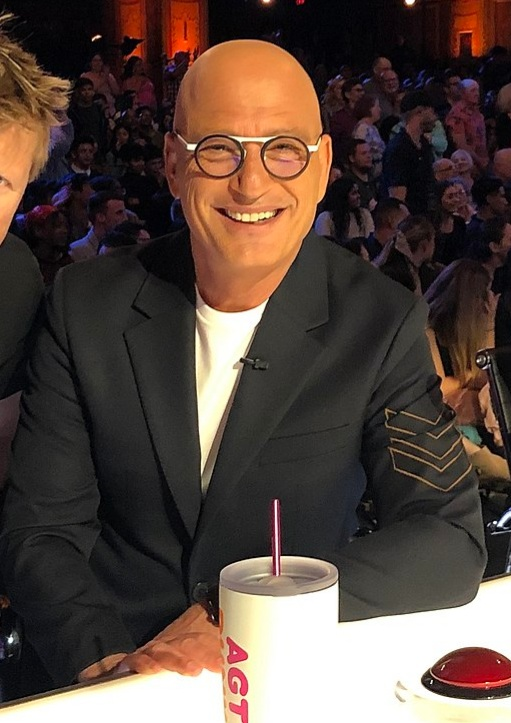
Howie Mandel

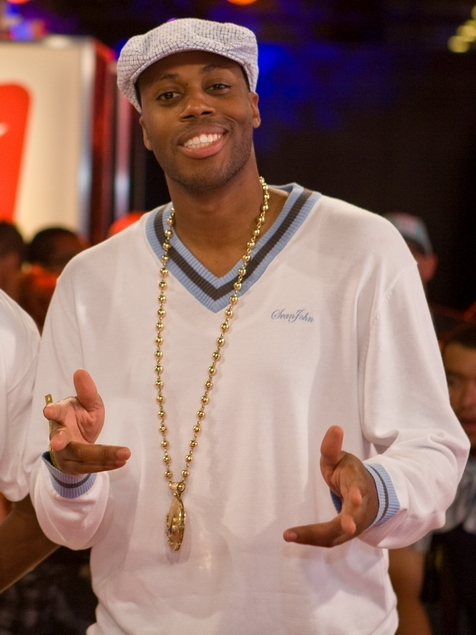
Kardinal Offishall

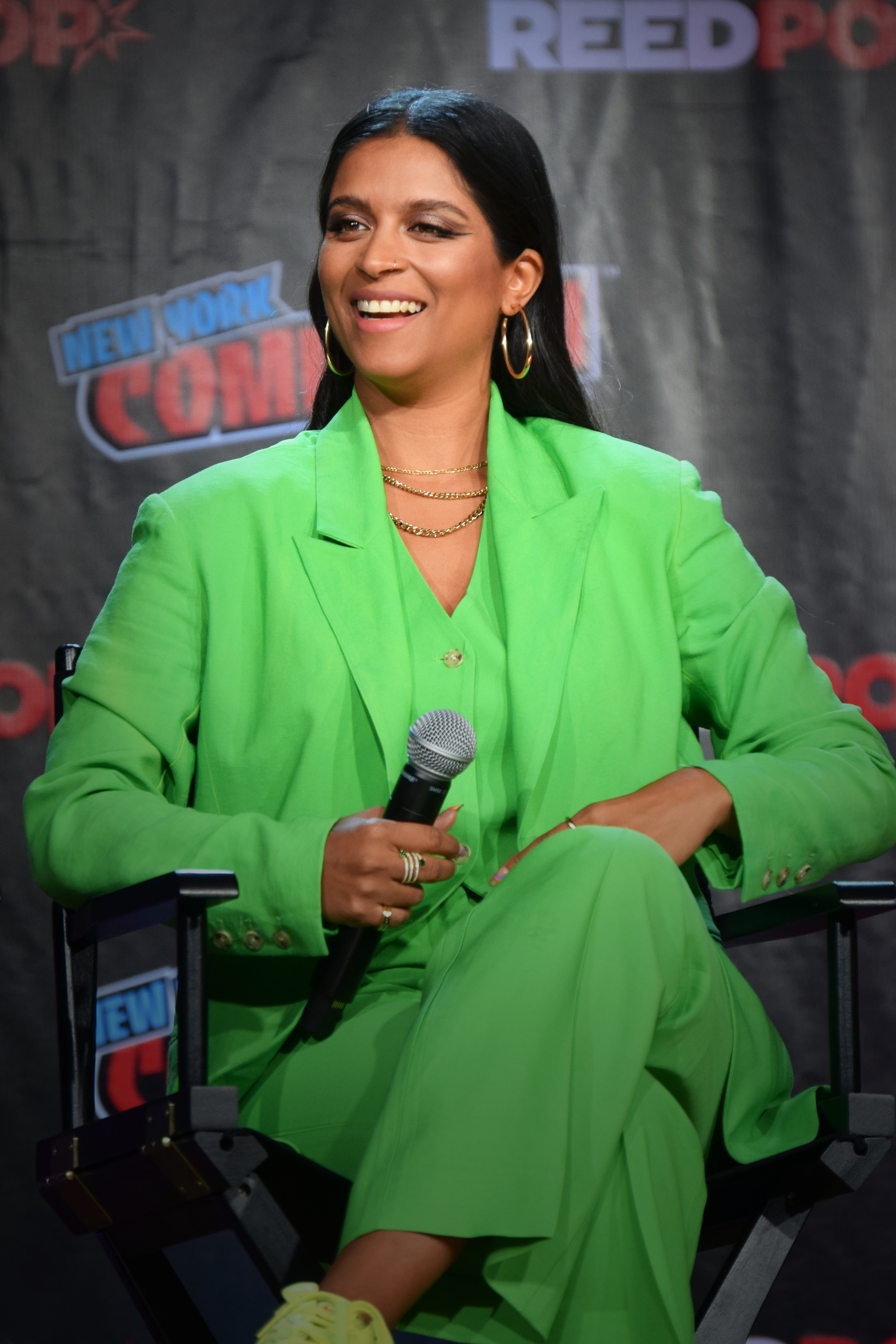
Lilly Singh

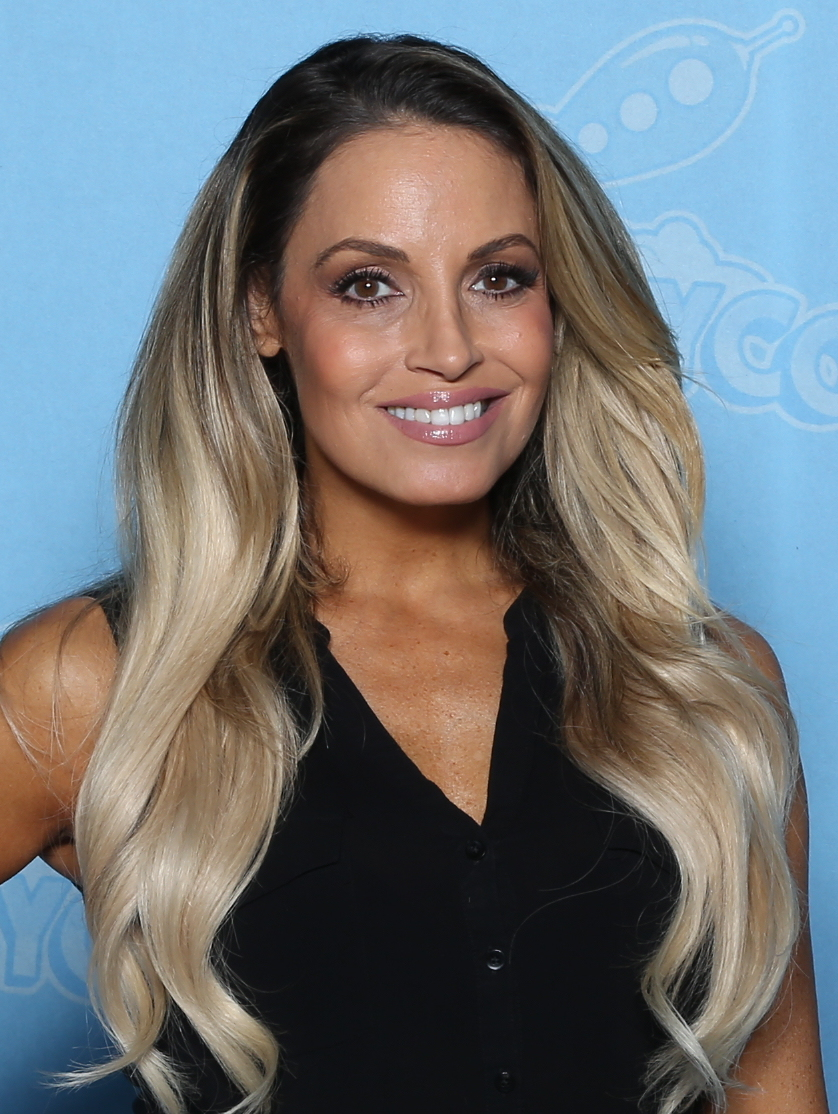
Trish Stratus

The show premiered with the same judges and host as the previous two seasons.

== Season overview ==
Winner | Runner-up | Third place | 4th place |
Finalist | The Eliminations | Golden Buzzer (Auditions) | Golden Buzzer (The Eliminations)

Participant	Genre	Act	From	Result
Eshan Sobti	Singing	Singer	Mission, BC	Third place
Funkanometry	Dance	Dance Duo	Vancouver Island, BC	Runner-up
Jade Mathieu	Singing	Singer	Longueuil, QC	Eliminated
Luka and Jenalyn	Dance	Dance Duo	Toronto, ON	Eliminated
Mark Clearview	Magic	Magician	Toronto, ON	Fourth place
Mark Lewis	Magic	Magician	Toronto, ON	Eliminated
Mat and Mym	Danger	Skating Duo	Quebec City, QC	Finalist
Matthew Cooper	Singing	Singer	Carbonear, NL	Eliminated
Natalie Morris	Singing	Singer	Toronto, ON	Finalist
Rebecca Strong	Singing	Singer	Prince Albert, SK	Winner
Sterling V. Scott	Comedy	Comedian	Edmonton, AB	Finalist
Together For Peace	Variety	Sand Art Duo	Lévis, QC	Eliminated
Travis Lindsay	Comedy	Comedian	Halifax, NS	Finalist
Troy James	Acrobatics	Contortionist	Brampton, ON	Eliminated

=== The Eliminations summary ===
Buzzed Out | Advanced (Golden Buzzer) | Advanced (Won the Judge's Vote) | Advanced (Won the Public's Vote)

The Eliminations (May 7th)

The judges could not decide between four acts (Eshan Sobti, Luka and Jenalyn, Matthew Cooper, Sterling V. Scott) who should advance, so decided to put it up to a Public Vote to determine which two would become finalists. The Public decided to choose Eshan and Sterling to advance to the Live Finale.

Participant	Order	Buzzes and Judges' votes				Result
Participant	Order	Mandel	Singh	Stratus	Offishall	Result
Mat and Mym	1					Advanced
Luka and Jenalyn	2					Eliminated
Jade Mathieu	3					Eliminated
Troy James	4					Eliminated
Eshan Sobti	5					Advanced
Matthew Cooper	6					Eliminated
Together For Peace	7					Eliminated
Natalie Morris	8					Advanced
Funkanometry	9					Advanced
Travis Lindsay	10					Advanced
Sterling V. Scott	11					Advanced
Rebecca Strong	12					Advanced
Mark Lewis	13					Eliminated
Mark Clearview	14					Advanced

=== Live Finale (May 14) ===
Winner | Runner-up | 3rd place | 4th place | Finalist

Finalist	Result (May 16)
Natalie Morris	Finalist
Mark Clearview	Fourth place
Rebecca Strong	Winner
Travis Lindsay	Finalist
Funkanometry	Runner-up
Eshan Sobti	Third place
Sterling V. Scott	Finalist
Matt and Mym	Finalist

== Production ==
In May 2023, Citytv announced that it had renewed Canada's Got Talent for a new season to premiere in 2024, and that the season would increase its grand prize to CA$1,000,000, which is credited to Citytv owner Rogers Communications. In addition, for the first time in franchise history, recipients of a Golden Buzzer during the auditions would also receive a $25,000 prize from sponsor CIBC. Filming began at OLG Stage at Niagara Fallsview Casino Resort on October 23, 2023.

The season included an appearance by Daniel Powter, who introduced himself as an aspiring singer-songwriter performing a song he wrote before launching into his 2005 hit "Bad Day". According to Powter, he did so because despite having had one of the biggest pop hits of the 21st century he had never actually had an opportunity to perform on Canadian television. He did not continue in the competition past the single appearance, although all four judges voted positive.

== Ratings ==
Order	Episode	Viewers (millions)	Rank (night)	Rank (week)
1	"The Million Dollar Season!"	TBD	—N/a	—N/a
2	"You Belong Here"	TBD	—N/a	—N/a
3	"A Good Day"	TBD	—N/a	—N/a
4	"We Love Surprises"	TBD	—N/a	—N/a
5	"It’s Always a Good Time"	TBD	—N/a	—N/a
