= Dino Archie =

Dino Archie is an American-Canadian stand-up comedian, originally from Fresno, California, and currently based in Vancouver, British Columbia. He is most noted as the 2015 winner of the Seattle International Comedy Competition.

He has also performed in Comedy Night with Rick Mercer in 2022, the third season of The New Wave of Standup in 2023, and the fifth season of Roast Battle Canada in 2026.
