= Bren D'Souza =

Canadian stand-up comedian

Bren D'Souza, formerly known as Brendan D'Souza, is a Canadian stand-up comedian. They are most noted for their appearances on Roast Battle Canada, for which they were a Canadian Screen Award nominee for Best Ensemble Performance in a Variety or Sketch Comedy Program or Series at the 12th Canadian Screen Awards in 2024.

Their debut comedy album, Clever, Hip, and Scary, was released in 2023. They have also hosted Shredded: The Post-Break-Up Podcast.
