= Dakota Ray Hebert =

Canadian actress and writer

Dakota Ray Hebert is a Dene comedian, actress and writer from Canada. She is most noted for her performance in the 2021 film Run Woman Run, for which she won the awards for Best Actress at the 2021 American Indian Film Festival and Best Performance at the 2022 Vancouver International Women in Film Festival.

Originally from Meadow Lake, Saskatchewan, Hebert first became known as a stage actress, including in productions of Tara Beagan's Dreary and Izzy, Falen Johnson's Salt Baby and Ellie Moon's This Was the World. In 2019, she both wrote and directed the play Native Studies 101 for the Gordon Tootoosis Nīkānīwin Theatre in Saskatoon.

In 2022 she released her debut comedy album I'll Give You an Indian Act, performed at the Toronto edition of Just for Laughs, and appeared in an episode of Comedy Night with Rick Mercer.

She co-stars in the new 2023 CTV workplace sitcom Shelved. She is also slated to appear in two Season 3 episodes of Roast Battle Canada, battling Paul Rabliauskas and Alan Shane Lewis.

in 2024, she co-starred in the Disney+ original series Echo.
