= Jarrett Campbell =

Canadian stand-up comedian

Jarrett Campbell is a Canadian stand-up comedian. He is most noted for his 2019 comedy album Straight White Fail, which received a Juno Award nomination for Comedy Album of the Year at the Juno Awards of 2020.

He is originally from the community of Maxwell in Grey Highlands, Ontario.
