= George Reinblatt =

Canadian playwright, writer (born 1977)

George Reinblatt is a Canadian playwright, television writer, and comedy writer from Toronto, Ontario. He is best known for writing for the Comedy Central Roasts, and for the hit off-Broadway stage show Evil Dead The Musical.

== Evil Dead the Musical ==
- Evil Dead the Musical - book & lyrics, music

=== Reviews ===
Evil Dead The Musical has had overwhelmingly positive reviews.

- The New York Times has called it "The Next Rocky Horror Show".
- Entertainment Weekly called it "The show is as funny as it is gory"
- The Hollywood Reporter called it "Silly, fun, loosely campy and not terrifying at all"
- And Variety (magazine) said "Evil Dead: The Musical” should be a disaster.... It has self-aware jokes, ironically earnest songs and a tacit assertion that the creators think their entire project is a goof. And yet it works. The show's wit, gore and stage magic make it a ridiculous amount of fun."
