= Abroad (TV series) =

Canadian sketch comedy television series

Abroad is a Canadian sketch comedy television series, which debuted in 2022 on OMNI Television. Created by Isabel Kanaan, the series presents comedy sketches in both English and Tagalog, inspired by Kanaan's own experience as a Filipino immigrant to Canada.

The cast also includes Justin Santiago, Nicco Lorenzo Garcia, Joy Castro and Aldrin Bundoc, with guest appearances by Christian Smith, Jon Blair, Nile Séguin, Natalie Metcalfe, Paloma Nuñez, Jillian Welsh, Sharjil Rasool, Carolyn Fe, Adelio Moras, Byron Abalos, Li Chen and Alanis Foroughi.

The series was produced by Longhope Media.

The series received a Canadian Screen Award nomination for Best Sketch Comedy Program or Series at the 11th Canadian Screen Awards in 2023.
