= Travis Lindsay =

Canadian stand-up comedian

Travis Lindsay is a Canadian stand-up comedian from Halifax, Nova Scotia, most noted as a member of the writing team for This Hour Has 22 Minutes since 2021.

After performing as a comedian for a number of years, he released his debut comedy album The Kid Is Alright in 2019.

In 2020 he was given a temporary gig as a warm-up comic at a taping of 22 Minutes, which soon turned into a permanent job. He joined the show's writing team in the 2021–22 season, and has appeared on the air as a featured player in some sketches. In 2021 he also released his second comedy album, Killed at the Funeral.

In 2023 he was featured in an episode of The New Wave of Standup. In 2024 he competed in the fourth season of Canada's Got Talent, reaching the finale.

Along with the other writers for 22 Minutes, he won the Canadian Screen Award for Best Writing in a Variety or Sketch Comedy Program or Series at the 12th Canadian Screen Awards.
