= Dan Dillabough =

Canadian television writer and comedian

Daniel Colin Dillabough (born 1992) is a Canadian television writer and comedian, best known for his work as a writer and correspondent on the CBC sketch comedy series This Hour Has 22 Minutes.

He was raised in St. John’s, Newfoundland and is currently based in Toronto. He joined the writing staff of 22 Minutes in 2022, before being invited to go on air in correspondent segments.

At the 12th and 13th Canadian Screen Awards, he shared in the award for Best Writing, Variety or Sketch Comedy along with the writing staff of This Hour Has 22 Minutes. In 2025, he received a WGC Screenwriting Award nomination for "Los Muchos Amores de Earl", an episode of the children's animated series Zokie of Planet Ruby.

He is queer.

== Filmography ==
| Year | Title | Role |
|---|---|---|
| 2015 | Night Sweats | writer |
| 2016 | The Other Kingdom | story editor |
| 2016 | Ride | junior story editor |
| 2017 | Schitt's Creek | story coordinator |
| 2017 | Man Seeking Woman | story coordinator |
| 2017 | FUBAR: Age of Computer | writer, 1 episode |
| 2019 | Miracle Workers | writers' assistant |
| 2019 | Alien News Desk | punch-up writer |
| 2019 | Good Witch | story coordinator |
| 2020 | D.N. Ace | writer, 1 episode |
| 2022—present | This Hour Has 22 Minutes | writer / story editor / correspondent |
| 2023 | Zokie of Planet Ruby | writer, 1 episode |
