= Brittany Lyseng =

Canadian comedian

Brittany Lyseng is a Canadian standup comedian from Calgary, Alberta. She is most noted as part of the ensemble that received a Canadian Screen Award nomination for Best Performance in a Variety or Sketch Comedy Program or Series at the 10th Canadian Screen Awards, for the debut episode of Roast Battle Canada.

Lyseng worked as an elevator mechanic before getting into standup comedy. She launched an open mic night in Calgary, and was a semi-finalist in SiriusXM Canada's Top Comic competition, before releasing her debut comedy album Going Up on 604 Records in 2019.

In 2020 she was featured in the CBC Gem stand-up comedy series The New Wave of Standup.

In 2024, Lyseng won the Seattle International Comedy Competition.
