= Keith Pedro =

Canadian comedian

Keith Pedro is a Canadian comedian. He is most noted for his 2021 comedy album Trillipino, for which he was a Juno Award nominee for Comedy Album of the Year at the Juno Awards of 2022.

In the same year, he was part of the ensemble that received a Canadian Screen Award nomination for Best Performance in a Variety or Sketch Comedy Program or Series at the 10th Canadian Screen Awards, for the debut episode of Roast Battle Canada.
