= Chris Robinson (Canadian actor) =

Canadian actor and comedian

Chris Robinson is a Canadian actor and comedian. He is most noted for his role as Virgil in the comedy series Pillow Talk, for which he and the other core cast members received an ensemble Canadian Screen Award nomination for Best Performance in a Variety or Sketch Comedy Program or Series at the 11th Canadian Screen Awards in 2023.

Prior to Pillow Talk he had a regular role in The Amazing Gayl Pile, as well as guest appearances in True Dating Stories, Ming's Dynasty, Bit Playas, The Boys, Odd Squad, TallBoyz, Workin' Moms and What We Do in the Shadows. In 2024 he had a regular supporting role in One More Time, for which he also wrote an episode.

A graduate of Humber College's program in comedy performance, he competed in the Homegrown and SiriusXM Top Comic competitions in the late 2010s. In 2020 he released his debut comedy album, Gut Bussa.
