= Chris Wilson (comedian) =

Canadian actor and sketch comedian

Chris Wilson is a Canadian actor and sketch comedian, most noted as a cast member of This Hour Has 22 Minutes. He first joined the show in 2020 as a writer and supporting player, and was promoted to a full-time cast member in the 2023–24 season due in part to his impersonation of Pierre Poilievre becoming increasingly important to the show in the runup to the 2025 Canadian federal election. Wilson has also played Justin Trudeau, even acting both Pierre Poilievre and Trudeau in the same sketch.

He is a native of Victoria, British Columbia.

Prior to joining 22 Minutes Wilson was part of the sketch comedy duo Peter & Chris with Peter Carlone. The duo performed at Just for Laughs and the Toronto Sketch Comedy Festival, and launched their own podcast, This Time It's Different, in 2021.

Wilson and the other core cast members of 22 Minutes won the Canadian Screen Award for Best Ensemble Performance in a Variety or Sketch Comedy Program or Series at the 12th Canadian Screen Awards in 2024 and at the 13th Canadian Screen Awards in 2025.

He has also made supporting or guest appearances in the television series Run the Burbs, Hudson & Rex, Cavendish, Murdoch Mysteries, The Next Step, Gary and His Demons and Cupcake & Dino: General Services.

In 2024 he appeared in the 19th season of America's Got Talent, performing a comedy magic act uncharacteristic of his normal comedic style. He received nos from all four judges. In a later interview on Chris Locke's Evil Men podcast, he revealed that he had been recruited by the show's producers, and given a scripted backstory that did not make any reference to his actual career as a prominent sketch comedian.
