= Salma Hindy =

Canadian stand-up comedian

Salma Hindy is a Canadian stand-up comedian. She is most noted for her appearance in the second season premiere of Roast Battle Canada, for which she and the other participants received an ensemble Canadian Screen Award nomination for best performance in a variety or sketch comedy program or series at the 11th Canadian Screen Awards in 2023.

The daughter of a Muslim imam, Hindy began performing comedy as a sideline while working as a biomedical engineer, after being encouraged to perform comedy by writer Zarqa Nawaz, the cousin of Hindy's brother-in-law. In her early comedy career she attracted attention for wearing the hijab on stage, although more recently she has stopped doing so.

In 2019, she was profiled in a short documentary by filmmaker Alia Youssef.

She has also appeared in the stand-up comedy series The New Wave of Standup, Comedy Night with Rick Mercer and The Stand Up Show with Jon Dore, had a small part in the 2021 film Scarborough, and has posted short comedy videos to social media platforms such as Instagram and TikTok.

Her debut comedy album, Born on 9/11, was released in 2022.

She was cast in the Prime Video Original series #1 Happy Family USA as Sharia.
