= Matt Wright (comedian) =

Canadian stand-up comedian

Matt Wright is a Canadian stand-up comedian from Newfoundland and Labrador. He is most noted as a two-time Juno Award nominee for Comedy Album of the Year, receiving nods for his 2019 album Existing Is Exhausting at the Juno Awards of 2021, and for his 2022 album Here Live, Not a Cat at the Juno Awards of 2023.

He competed in the fifth season of Canada's Got Talent in 2025.
