= Mayce Galoni =

Canadian stand-up comedian

Mayce Galoni is a Canadian stand-up comedian, whose comedy album Awkwarder received a Juno Award nomination for Comedy Album of the Year at the 2019 Juno Awards.

Originally from the community of Binbrook in Hamilton, Ontario, he is currently based in Los Angeles, California. In 2016, he was a finalist in SiriusXM Canada's Top Comic competition, and competed again in 2017. He also received three nominations at the 2019 Vancouver Comedy Awards for Best Comedy Album, Best Clean Joke, and Breakout Artist.

He is in a relationship with comedian Sophie Buddle, and they co-host the podcast Obsessed.
