= Ron Josol =

- Born: Ronald Allan Josol; August 2, 1974 (age 52); Toronto, Ontario, Canada

Comedy career
- Years active: 1997–present
- Medium: stand-up, television, film, radio
- Genre: Observational comedy
- Subjects: Everyday Observations, Filipino Culture

Ronald Allan Josol (born August 2, 1974) is a Filipino Canadian actor and stand-up comedian. He has been featured on the show Video on Trial, which he has also written for.
