= Daniel Woodrow =

Canadian stand-up comedian

Daniel Woodrow is a Canadian stand-up comedian based in Toronto, Ontario. He is most noted as part of the ensemble that received a Canadian Screen Award nomination for Best Performance in a Variety or Sketch Comedy Program or Series at the 10th Canadian Screen Awards, for the debut episode of Roast Battle Canada.

He grew up in Toronto as the adopted son of a white family.

He has been an organizer of the Underground Comedy Railroad, an all-Black Canadian comedy tour which takes place each year during Black History Month. In 2021, with the tour unable to take place due to the COVID-19 pandemic in Canada, he created the Unknown Comedy Club, an online streaming platform for comedy performances.

In 2026 he released the comedy album My Family Is White.

He has also had acting roles in the television series The Beaverton, Star Trek: Discovery and Pretty Hard Cases.
