= This Hour Has 22 Minutes =

Canadian TV comedy series

- Also known as: 22 Minutes
- Created by: Mary Walsh
- Starring: Cathy Jones; Rick Mercer; Greg Thomey; Mary Walsh; Colin Mochrie; Gavin Crawford; Mark Critch; Shaun Majumder; Geri Hall; Susan Kent; Trent McClellan; Aba Amuquandoh; Stacey McGunnigle; Chris Wilson
- Country of origin: Canada
- Original language: English
- No. of seasons: 33
- No. of episodes: 703

Production
- Executive producers: Michael Donovan; Jack Kellum; Mark Farrell; Tim McAuliffe; Peter McBain; Mike Allison
- Running time: 22 minutes
- Production companies: Salter Street Films (1993–2004); Alliance Atlantis (2004–2005); IoM Media Ventures (Note: Originally known as Halifax Film Company, DHX Media Halifax and DHX Studios Halifax) (2005–); DHX Media (2006–2018) (Note: All seasons, under all the respective above companies, are credited under 22 Minutes (Note: Numbered with Roman numerals for each season) Incorporated.); Island of Misfits (2018–present)

Original release
- Network: CBC Television
- Release: October 11, 1993 – present

This Hour Has 22 Minutes (commonly shortened to 22 Minutes since 2009) is a weekly Canadian television comedy that airs on CBC Television. Launched in 1993 during Canada's 35th general election, the show focuses on Canadian politics with a combination of news parody, sketch comedy, and satirical editorials. Originally featuring Cathy Jones, Rick Mercer, Greg Thomey, and Mary Walsh, the series featured satirical sketches of the weekly news and Canadian political events. The show's format is a mock news program, intercut with comic sketches, parody commercials, and humorous interviews of public figures.

Its full name is a parody of This Hour Has Seven Days, a CBC news magazine from the 1960s; the "22 Minutes" refers to the fact that a half-hour television program in Canada is typically 22 minutes long with eight minutes of commercials. Jones and Walsh had previously worked together on the sketch comedy series CODCO, on which Thomey sometimes appeared as a guest. Mercer had been a notable young writer and performer on his own, touring several successful one-man shows of comedic political commentary. Salter Street Films produced the series until the 2003–2004 season. Salter Street was acquired in 2001 by Alliance Atlantis, and production of the series was transferred directly to Alliance Atlantis in the twelfth season. In 2005 Halifax Film, a new company formed by Salter co-founder Michael Donovan, took over production of the show. In 2006, Halifax Film merged with Decode Entertainment to form DHX Media (now WildBrain), which has produced the show since. In 2019, the rights were sold to IoM Media Ventures, which acquired DHX's Halifax studio the year prior.

Recognized with 24 Gemini Awards and 11 Canadian Comedy Awards, 22 Minutes is taped before a live audience within the old World Trade Centre in downtown Halifax, Nova Scotia. Its 28th season was taped at the Light House Arts Centre in Halifax with a smaller audience and crew. The series, which originally aired on Mondays for several seasons and later on Fridays, currently airs Tuesdays at 8:00 p.m. on CBC. The series formerly followed the Rick Mercer Report.

== Cast ==
Although each cast member's real name was always shown at the beginning of each episode, at the end of most episodes prior to 2006, one cast member would sign off using their anchor character's name, which is noted below where known. This has now been discontinued, and anchors now regularly address each other by their real names.

=== Current members ===
- Mark Critch (2003–present), as anchor (formerly Bas MacLaren, apparently in homage to two well-known Newfoundland radio announcers, Bas Jamieson and George MacLaren) and various correspondents and sketch characters.
- Trent McClellan (2017–present) as anchor and various correspondents and sketch characters.
- Aba Amuquandoh (2021–present) as anchor and various correspondents and sketch characters.
- Stacey McGunnigle (2021–present) as anchor and various correspondents and sketch characters.
- Chris Wilson (2023–present) as anchor and various correspondents and sketch characters.

For the 2020 season, the show added Nik Sexton, Tom Stanley and Jon Sturge as field reporters covering the 2020 United States elections.

In addition to the main cast, some members of the show's writing team, including Heidi Brander, Adam Christie, Sophie Buddle, Aisha Brown, Nadine Bhabha, Isabel Kanaan, Brandon Ash-Mohammed, Jordan Foisy, Travis Lindsay, Ajahnis Charley, Dan Dillabough and Leonard Chan, have also appeared in sketches as supporting players. Wilson was promoted to a full cast member in the 2023-24 season, after having also been a writer and supporting player since 2021.

Mark McKinney joined the show in 2025 to play prime minister Mark Carney for the duration of the 2025 Canadian federal election.

=== Former members ===
- Cathy Jones (1993–2021) as anchor (formerly Sydney Dubizzenchyk, a reference to former CBC anchor Tina Srebotnjak, who had become the host of Midday in 1992) and various correspondents and sketch characters. Jones was the longest running anchor in the show's history, and the last of the show's four original cast members to leave.
- Rick Mercer (1993–2001) as anchor J. B. Dickson and various correspondents and sketch characters. Mercer left the show to devote more time to Made in Canada; after that show ended he launched Rick Mercer Report, a series similar to 22 Minutes.
- Colin Mochrie (2001–2003) as anchor Anthony St. George and various correspondents and sketch characters. Mochrie left the show after two seasons to pursue his own projects and other movie roles, returning to guest star on the January 27, 2006 episode. Mochrie was the first addition to the original cast, following the departure of Rick Mercer.
- Mary Walsh (1993–2004) as anchor Molly McGuire and various correspondents and sketch characters. Walsh appeared less often in season 11 and left the series to pursue her film career and to host Mary Walsh: Open Book, a CBC series in which she moderated a celebrity panel discussing books and literature. Walsh has returned to the show several times as a guest since her departure, most notably for a 2011 appearance in which Walsh, in character as Marg Delahunty, accosted controversial Toronto mayor Rob Ford in his driveway.
- Greg Thomey (1993–2005) as anchor Frank MacMillan and various correspondents and sketch characters. Thomey appeared less often in season 12 and left the show in 2006. In season 22, Thomey has been appearing as a regular guest.
- Geri Hall (2007–2011), as anchor and various correspondents and sketch characters. Hall had previously been a fill-in anchor in fall 2004 and March 2007.
- Gavin Crawford (2003–2011) as anchor (formerly Gavin Cooper, a possible homage to Anderson Cooper) and various correspondents and sketch characters.
- Shaun Majumder (2003–2010, 2011–2018) as anchor (formerly Tucker T. Bartlett) and various correspondents and sketch characters. He appeared less often in his last couple of years with the show, and eventually left the series to star on Detroit 1-8-7, but returned to the show starting in the 19th season. He was fired from the show in June 2018 and made it public in August 2018, citing creative differences with a producer.
- Susan Kent (2012–2020) as anchor and various correspondents and sketch characters. Guest star multiple times in 2022.

== Substitute anchors/special correspondents ==
Substitute news anchors on the series are people who "guest star" on the series for when series regulars are away (from Season 10 onwards).

- Mark Farrell (February 1999)
- Jonathan Torrens (September/October 2002)
- Dan Joffre (February 2003)
- Jennifer Robertson (November and December 2003)
- Kathy Greenwood (October and November 2004)
- Shauna MacDonald (October 2005 – November 2005)
- Tracy Dawson (March 10, 2006)
- Rebecca Northan (November 2006 and March 2007)
- Nathan Fielder (2007, as special correspondent)
- Alan Thicke (2011, in a 1980s themed show)
- P. K. Subban (2012 season premiere)
- George Lazenby (November 27, 2012)
- Joel Plaskett (March 5, 2013)
- Meredith MacNeill, 9 episodes (2012–2017)
- Jennifer Whalen, head writer guested on-screen occasionally
- Abdul Butt (2013–2015, as special correspondent)
- Ross Rebagliati (February 4, 2014)
- Andrew Barber (Vancouver-based comedian and sole performer in "I'm In Love With Steven Harper" sketch, uploaded on April 2, 2015 on YouTube)

== Regular characters and segments ==
Talking to Americans
Rick Mercer tours the United States, talking to Americans as if from a Canadian news program, asking them about "Canadian issues". The object is to see how little some Americans know about their northern neighbours. The piece was so popular that the CBC had Mercer create a one-hour TV special based on the segment. It became the highest rated comedy special in Canadian television history when it aired on Canada Day, 2001. Popular bits include Mercer getting Americans to say "Congratulations Canada on legalizing VCRs!" and getting a professor at Princeton University to sign a petition against the re-starting of the Annual Toronto Polar Bear Hunt. In an election 2000 segment, he convinced then-Governor of Texas George W. Bush that Canada's Prime Minister Jean Chrétien was named Jean Poutine and that he was supporting Bush's candidacy. The success of the CBC special got Mercer attention on numerous American media outlets, including ABC's Nightline. Mercer abandoned the concept after September 11, 2001.
No Pun Intended
A Ludacris-ish Indian rapper/politician played by Shaun Majumder who frequently raps about election issues and what he will do if elected.

Babe Bennett
A 22 Minutes "sexual affairs correspondent" played by Cathy Jones, Babe is a sassy suffragette, 1940s style, who talks about sexual matters. She ends each segment by saying "I'm just goofin' around!"
Marg Delahunty
Mary Walsh crashes press conferences, hosts a "sleepover" for the nation's leading female (and gay) politicians, and threatens to "smite" the likes of politicians as "Marg Princess Warrior" (a loose parody of Xena).
Mark Jackson
22 Minutes' teenage correspondent that talks to politicians and who is played by Gavin Crawford. (The character is carried over from The Gavin Crawford Show.)
Bas MacLaren
A 22 Minutes correspondent portrayed by Mark Critch. He talks to politicians about current events and is also one of the 22 Minutes anchors.

Misses Enid & Eulalia
Two elderly women who talk about daily events (portrayed by Cathy Jones and Mary Walsh, respectively). Upon Walsh's departure from the show, Jones has appeared alone as Miss Enid. (The characters were normally introduced as "the Misses Enid and Eulalia", meaning "Miss Enid and Miss Eulalia", but this was frequently misunderstood by viewers as "Mrs. Enid" and "Eulalia" without an honorific.) The characters were later reunited in the CBC Gem web series Broad Appeal: Living with E's.
Streeters, aka The Rant.
A weekly commentary on current events and political issues, which quickly became the show's most famous feature, by Rick Mercer in black and white presentations. This segment was later used in colour presentations on the Rick Mercer Report series.
Max Pointy
A spoof of CBC personality Rex Murphy's political commentaries for The National, performed by Colin Mochrie. Max would start off with a legitimate political issue but end up on an unrelated and generally inane point by the end of his rant. Discontinued when Mochrie left the show.
That Show Sucked!
with Ma and Eddie Reardon (portrayed by Mary Walsh & Greg Thomey) who make fun of TV shows, with Ma saying that whatever show that Eddie watches "Suck" and constantly demanding that he give her "the G. D. clickerbox". Discontinued when Walsh left the show.
The Quinlan Quints
four quintuplets (the fifth one went missing and has never been found) who live in Buchans, Newfoundland and Labrador – inspired by the fame of the Dionne quintuplets; portrayed by Cathy Jones, Rick Mercer, Greg Thomey and Mary Walsh (Colin Mochrie plays Mercer's quint role for seasons 9 and 10). Usually interviewed by Mercer's character J. B. Dickson, the Quints would boast about something outlandish that Dickson has a hard time believing until one of the quints (usually Jones) spills the beans and reveals that what they were promoting was really a scam. Discontinued when Mochrie left the show.
Inside Media Counter-spin
A satirical talk show with the host, Heather Coulter, portrayed by Cathy Jones. The host makes blatantly stereotypical statements about her guests.
Panic Room with Betty Hope
Host Betty Hope (played by Cathy Jones) parodies Nancy Grace in "breaking news" style segments, in which she interviews someone knowledgeable about a given threat and then spins the facts to make them sound more dramatic and dangerous.
The Right Answer
Two conservative commentators (played by Rick Mercer and Greg Thomey) debate various issues in the news. When one of them makes a point, they hit a chess timer. Discontinued when Mercer left the show.
The Special Eds
Mercer and Thomey portray two members of the RCMP – Special Constable Ed Cochrane and Special Constable Ed Codner – with questionable ethics. Discontinued when Mercer left the show.
Nathan Fielder On Your Side
Nathan Fielder plays a consumer affairs reporter who is socially awkward, speaks in a near-monotone, and tends to make his interview subjects uncomfortable. Fielder went on to utilize the persona on the American TV show, Nathan for You.

=== Crawford's characters ===
Stuart McLean
Based on the CBC personality.

Uwe Meyer
A fashion correspondent that Gavin Crawford portrays. (The character is carried over from The Gavin Crawford Show.)

Gunter Wilson
A computer whiz who hosts the segment "Computer Corner".

Natasha Stillwell
Based on the former co-host of Discovery Channel's show Daily Planet.

Mark Jackson
The teen correspondent of the program, has severe acne and is repeatedly picked on, also talks with a basic braces lisp. Retired in late 2010.

Rob Boberston
An artist that does a segment called Art Break, a parody of the classic art series The Joy of Painting and its host Bob Ross.

Chantal Hébert
Based on the political journalist and pundit.

=== Critch's characters ===
Rex Murphy
Based on the newspaper columnist and CBC personality.

Danny Williams
Based on the former premier of Newfoundland and Labrador. On the October 16, 2007 episode, the real Danny Williams kicked him off and took over his seat in the news desk during the show's first segment.

Don Cherry

Donald Trump

Caillou
In the segment, Caillou was fired from PBS and his show was cancelled after 20 years, due to cuts.

=== Hall's characters ===
Avery Adams, Single Female Voter
A prospective voter who confronts politicians about potential "relationships". Perhaps best known for her first appearance in October 2008, in which Hall / Adams was apprehended by security during a Stephen Harper press conference, she also later attracted some controversy when Ontario MPP Peter Kormos shouted her out of a press conference with Premier Dalton McGuinty.

=== Jones' characters ===
Sandy Campbell
Host of The Campbell Files, a parody of entertainment shows such as Entertainment Tonight.

Joe Crow
An Aboriginal environmental "correspondent" who talks about the environment and the Canadian government's relation with Native peoples. Each segment ends with Crow blowing out his campfire with a single puff.

Mrs. Enid
An elderly lady with plenty to say about many different issues.

Betty Hope
A parody of CNN host Nancy Grace.

Janet Tucker
A rude U.S/Canadian relations worker who usually is against any changes between the two countries and usually insults Canadians with long insults. She also sounds like she has a New York accent.

=== Majumder's characters ===
Raj Binder
a sweaty soft-spoken Indian sports nerd portrayed by Shaun Majumder, who has also been used as a behind-the-scenes interviewer on Just for Laughs.

Ian Hanomansing
Based on the CBC personality.

Barnibus Pine
Introduced during a 2014 episode as a "lumbersexual", a woodsman who arouses Kent.

=== Mercer's characters ===
Billyatropia "Billy" Smithopolis
An "outstanding" Canadian sports athlete. Billy has a fear of heights and, according to one sketch, is the only Canadian going to the 2008 Olympic Games for sure.

Gus Van Gus
A "financial advisor" who insists the secret to gaining wealth is to send him "all your money".

=== Mochrie's characters ===
Max Pointy
Based on CBC radio personality Rex Murphy

Peter Mansbridge
Used in Mansbridge One on One parody sketches, where "Peter" has insightful interviews with himself.

=== Thomey's characters ===
Jerry Boyle
a Newfoundland separatist whose campaign slogan is "If you can mark an X, you're my kind of people!" The character was created as a recurring character on CODCO.

Ottawa Gargoyle
A gargoyle who sits on top of the Parliament buildings and satirizes politicians, occasionally throwing hot oil on them.

Tim MacMillan
Foreign correspondent who's (almost) never where he's supposed to be. He's also Frank MacMillan's brother. His segments would open with a recurring style of dialogue. "Hello, Tim?" "HELLLOOOOOOOOOO!!!!!" "Are you in Geneva?" [pause.] "NOOOOOOOOOOOOO!!!!"

=== Walsh's characters ===
Connie Bloor
A 22 Minutes Prairie correspondent played by Mary Walsh, who reports from a donut shop. Introduced in each segment by the line: "She's flat as the prairies and twice as wide", she wears a tuque and earmuffs, and her speech is punctuated with a series of snorts. One of her recurring gags involves feeding paper printouts of celebrities and politicians through a paper shredder.

Marg Delahunty
A 22 Minutes correspondent played by Walsh, Marg Delahunty is an interviewer whose specialty is finding suspectible politicians and hounding them with off-the-cuff interviews designed to satirize and even embarrass them. Some of these interviews were conducted in the guise of "Marg, Princess Warrior", a parody of the title character of Xena: Warrior Princess portrayed by Lucy Lawless.

Dakey Dunn
A 22 Minutes "Male Correspondent" played by Walsh, replete with gold chain, hairy chest, cigarette and beer, who regularly lays out a macho view of economic and cultural matters. This character was earlier used in the CODCO series. Dakey also once accosted Margaret Atwood at a book signing, reciting one of her most famous poems over and over again.

== Famous stunts ==
=== Jean Poutine ===
1999–2000 – During the 2000 American election, Rick Mercer approached Republican presidential candidate George W. Bush on a campaign stop in Michigan, asking for comment on the news that Bush had received the endorsement of Canadian prime minister "Jean Poutine". The then-prime minister's name was Jean Chrétien, and he had not endorsed Bush – it is standard practice for the Canadian government not to endorse anyone in a foreign election.

Bush – who had previously stated that "you can't stump me on world leaders" – acknowledged the purported endorsement with a short statement to the 22 Minutes cameras, which aired as part of the show's regular Talking to Americans feature. The Talking To Americans segments – and eventual one-hour special – were produced and directed by Geoff D'Eon.

In his first official state visit to Canada four years later, Bush joked that his "one regret" about the visit was that he'd "hoped to meet Jean Poutine."

=== Stockwell/Doris petition ===
2000–01 – Often cited as the show's best joke, the sketch was aired during the 2000 federal election campaign, and consisted of a staged rant by Rick Mercer.

During the 2000 federal election, then-Canadian Alliance leader Stockwell Day proposed a mechanism to call for a referendum. A petition on any particular subject which gathered at least 350,000 signatures of voting age citizens ("3% of the electors") would automatically trigger a national referendum.

Mercer's "rant" asked viewers to log on to the 22 Minutes website, and sign an online petition asking the party leader to change his name to Doris Day (after the singer/actress). Mercer wanted the petition to involve Day changing his name while the Doris Day reference was suggested by 22 Minutes writer Luciano Casimiri. Producers claim to have obtained in excess of 1,200,000 online votes. This was cheerfully admitted to be a stunt unhampered by the rigours of an Elections Canada-controlled petition. Although the sketch had no effect on Alliance policy, it did obtain international publicity for the show and contributed to the general air of farce surrounding Day's election campaign. Day's response to the petition was, "Que será, será".

=== Oilers vs Canadiens ===
2003–04 – Shaun Majumder, in character as "Raj Binder", was sent to report on the 2003 outdoors Edmonton Oilers and Montreal Canadiens old timers game, preceding the night's actual NHL regular season game, the Heritage Classic, which was the first NHL game to be played outdoors (at Commonwealth Stadium in Edmonton). Majumder actually snuck into all the team photos, causing uproar from the event's unwitting organizers in the days after, when the photos were released to the press.

=== Marg ambushes Rob Ford ===
On October 24, 2011, Walsh reprised the role of "Marg, Princess Warrior", conducting an ambush interview of Toronto Mayor Rob Ford at his home, which aired on 22 Minutes the following evening. Ford's reaction and alleged verbal abuse directed at a 911 operator made national headlines. Ford claimed that he had never seen nor heard of 22 Minutes.

== Controversies ==
Typeface used in logo up to 2009

On November 17, 2004, clips of a sketch for 22 Minutes were released, in which Liberal MP Carolyn Parrish stomped on a George W. Bush doll and performed voodoo on its head, where she said "it would do the least damage". The incident sparked significant outrage from the opposition Conservatives, who argued that it had the potential to damage diplomatic relations between Canada and the United States. As a result of the incident Parrish was expelled from the Liberal Party and sat the remainder of her term as an Independent.

Richard Martineau wrote a column in Le Journal de Montréal criticizing a sketch aired October 7, 2007, entitled "Quebec Nation". In the sketch, two characters discussed the state of affairs after a separation from Canada, which left them with "no roads, no towns, not even radio. The only things we take [sic] is our racism". Martineau also discussed the fact that This Hour Has 22 Minutes is broadcast by the CBC and is funded by funds also coming from Quebec.

In May 2015, the American sketch comedy series Saturday Night Live aired a sketch in which a contestant on a Win, Lose or Draw–style game show panicked at being asked to draw the Muslim prophet Muhammad, igniting allegations that SNL had plagiarized a nearly identical sketch which aired on 22 Minutes in January.

== Specials ==
- This Hour Has 22 Minutes' 100th Episode Spectacular (1997)
- This Hour Has 22 Minutes: News Year '98 (1998)
- This Hour Has 22 Minutes Direct Hits (1999)
- This Hour Has 22 Minutes: Holiday Special 2000 (2000)
- Rick Mercer's Talking to Americans (2001)
- This Hour Has 22 Minutes: New Years '02 (2002)
- This Hour Has 22 Minutes: The Best of Cathy Jones and Mark Critch (2005)
- This Hour Has 22 Minutes: 2006 Election Special (2006)
- This Hour Has 22 Minutes: The Best of Rob Ford (2013)
- This Hour Has 22 Minutes: This Hour Has 22 Years (2014)
- This Hour Has 22 Minutes Has 44 Minutes: A U.S. Election Special (2024)
- Vote Canadian: A 22 Minutes Election Special (2025)

== DVD releases ==
Entertainment One has released the first two seasons on DVD in Region 1 (Canada only).
