= Hisham Kelati =

Canadian stand-up comedian

Hisham Kelati is a Canadian stand-up comedian. He is most noted for his 2021 comedy album Tigre King, for which he was a Juno Award nominee for Comedy Album of the Year at the Juno Awards of 2022.

He was previously a Canadian Comedy Award nominee for Best Taped Live Performance at the 19th Canadian Comedy Awards in 2019, for his appearance on the web comedy series 10 Minute Talk Show.
