= Aisha Brown =

Canadian comedian and actress

Aisha Brown is a Canadian stand-up comedian and actress. She is most noted for her 2020 comedy special Aisha Brown: The First Black Woman Ever, which was the first Crave Original comedy special ever taped by a Black Canadian comedian.

The special received three Canadian Screen Award nominations at the 9th Canadian Screen Awards in 2021, including one for Best Variety or Entertainment Special, which it won. She also received a second nomination in the latter category as a member of the writing team for This Hour Has 22 Minutes.

As an actress, she has appeared in sketches on The Beaverton and Baroness von Sketch Show, and in the comedy series Humour Resources.
