= Trent McClellan =

Canadian comedian (born 1972)

- Born: 1972 (age 53–54); Corner Brook, Newfoundland and Labrador, Canada
- Website: https://trentscomedy.com/

Trent McClellan (born 1972) is a Canadian stand-up comedian. Originally from Corner Brook, Newfoundland and Labrador, he has been based in Calgary, Alberta since 2004. Since 2017 he has been a main cast member of the comedy series This Hour Has 22 Minutes.

He has toured extensively across Canada, both as a headlining performer and as an opening act for Gerry Dee, and has performed at the Just for Laughs Festival, the Winnipeg Comedy Festival, the Halifax Comedy Festival and other comedy festivals. He performed a half-hour special for The Comedy Network's Comedy Now! series in 2008, and has appeared on CBC Radio's series The Debaters.

He defended Lisa Moore's novel February in the 2013 edition of Canada Reads. The novel won the competition.
