= Sophie Buddle =

Canadian stand-up comedian

- Born: August 7, 1994 (age 32); Montreal, Canada
- Occupation: Comedian

Sophie Buddle is a Canadian stand-up comedian, originally from Ottawa. She is most noted for her 2019 comedy album A Lil Bit of Buddle, which won the Juno Award for Comedy Album of the Year at the Juno Awards of 2020. She was the first woman to win the award as a solo stand-up comedian.

Buddle has written for the sketch comedy series This Hour Has 22 Minutes and the late night show After Midnight. She was a semi-finalist in the 2018 edition of SiriusXM Canada's "Canada's Top Comic" competition and was named one of "Comedians You Should and Will Know" in 2023.

She is in a relationship with comedian Mayce Galoni, with whom she cohosts the podcast Obsessed.
