= List of Canadian comedians =

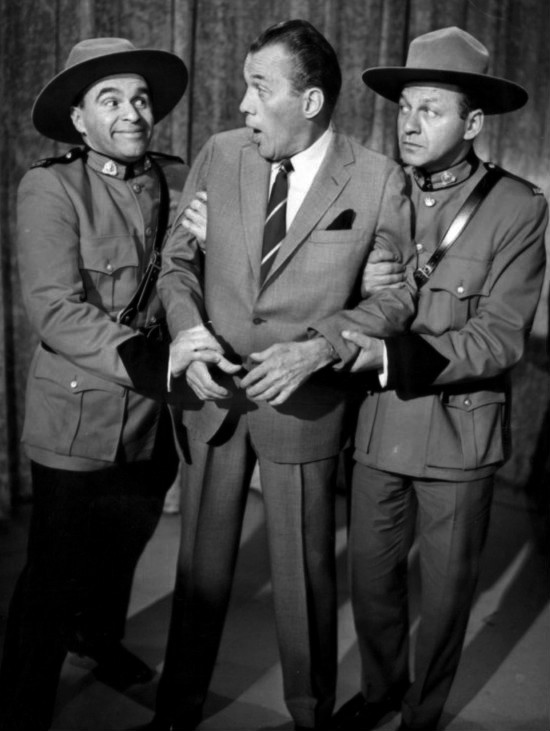
Wayne and Shuster, dressed as Mounties, apprehend their host on The Ed Sullivan Show in 1963.

Canadian comedians have been recognized internationally since the 1910s (Note: Canada's first internationally successful comedy troupe, The Dumbells, had hit shows on Broadway and London's West End after being founded as a WWI concert party.) and were embraced as the country sought a national identity distinct from that of Great Britain and the United States. Canadians closely identify with their sense of humour, and working-class Canadians popularly consider comedians, along with singers and musical acts, as the country's cultural best. Canadians are known to value modesty, politeness and social responsibility, and comedians who develop their craft before such audiences become acutely aware of the fine lines of comedy.

== Overview ==
=== Types of humour ===
Many Canadian comedians have been influenced by American and British culture and humour. They blend the comic traditions of these cultures with Canadian humour while maintaining an outsider perspective, the latter providing a separation or ironic distance which has allowed for keen observational humour, impressions and parody. Comedy critics have described this as absorbing and adapting a dominant culture.

Dark and fatalistic humour is also used extensively by Canadian comedians. This is generally attributed to the common reference point of the Canadian climate, the dangers of which are well known to comedians who tour the vast and often sparsely populated country. It may be impossible to change one's fate in the face of overwhelming forces, but the comedian allows the audience to use laughter as a coping mechanism.

=== Social pressures ===
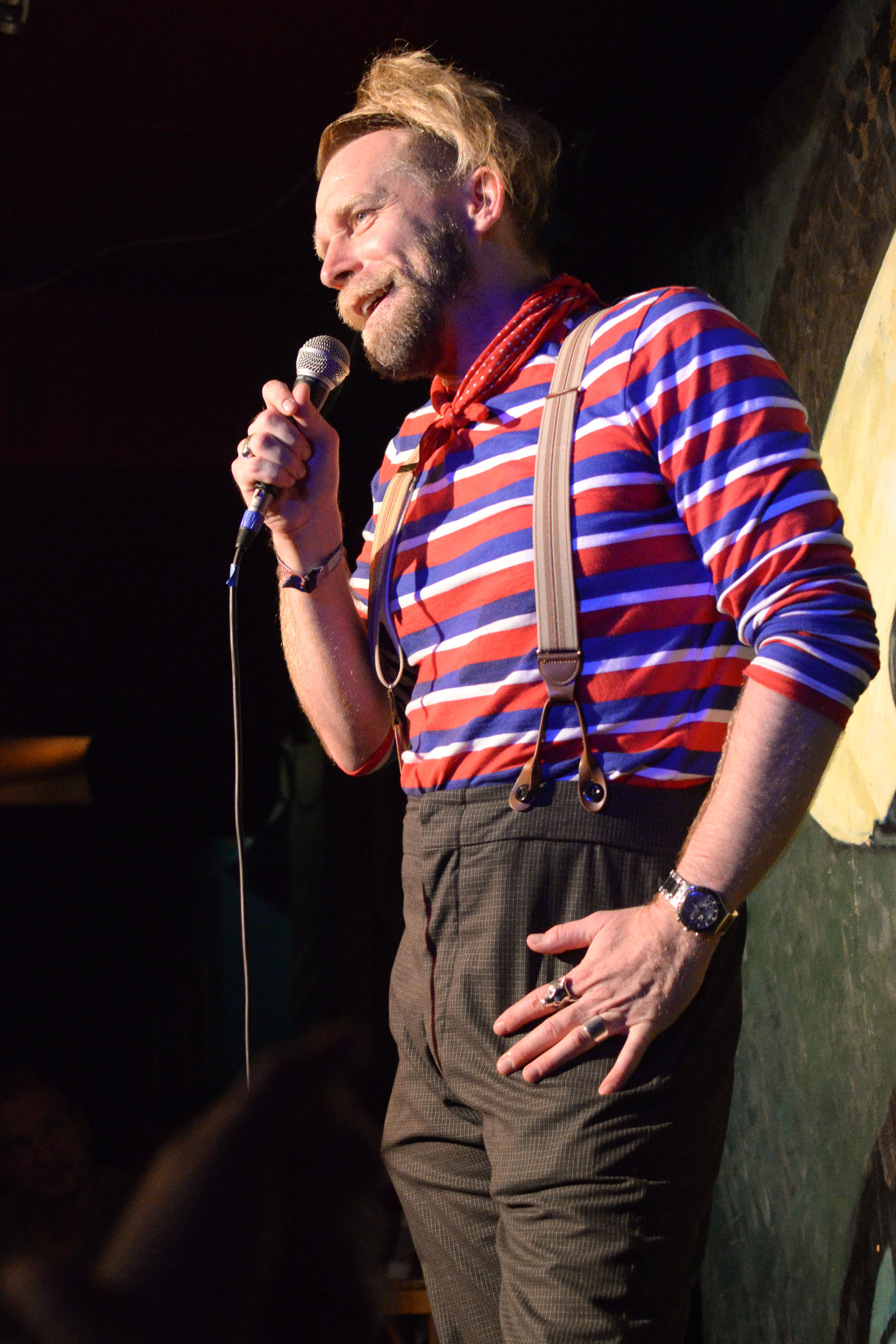
Tony Law at the Edinburgh Fringe Festival

Domestic audiences traditionally value the collective good over individual freedom of expression, and as a consequence also value politeness and modesty. To overcome the taboo against social criticism, some Canadian comedians will link comedic discontent to group survival. Others will use a character or persona as a comedic mask, a tool which has allowed satire to gain mainstream popularity. Comedic characters with broad appeal are typically low-status, non-threatening, and likeable despite their misbehaviour.

While social pressures cause Canadians to repress their fears and anxieties, comedians expose such through comedic art. Individual audience members externalize their reaction as laughter, publicly displaying their value system. When an audience laughs together it creates consensus at sharing a common worldview. Canadian comedians thus learn to be surrogates, using individual expression to reaffirm the collective while voicing and soothing the audience's troubles.

=== Industry ===
Due to limited opportunities in Canada's entertainment industry, most comedians struggle to earn a living. Those who persevere have tended to place importance on artistic freedom, and are more likely to maintain creative control of their work. Some Canadian comedians move to the larger and more lucrative market of the United States, where they are perceived as "seasoned newcomers", having spent years developing their craft outside the notice of Hollywood.

Since 2000, Canadian comedians have been recognized by the Canadian Comedy Awards (CCA), which has bestowed over 350 awards for comedy in live performances, film, television, radio, and Internet media. Television comedy has also been recognized by the Canadian Screen Awards.

Film and broadcast performers are represented by the Alliance of Canadian Cinema, Television and Radio Artists (ACTRA), theatre performers by the Canadian Actors' Equity Association (CAEA), comedy writers by the Writers Guild of Canada (WGC), and stand-up comedians by the Canadian Association of Stand-up Comedians (CASC).

== List ==
Notable Canadian comedians include:

=== A ===
- Roger Abbott
- Raymond Ablack
- Aaron Abrams
- David Acer
- Marty Adams
- Matt Alaeddine
- Dana Alexander
- Aisha Alfa
- Todd Allen
- Aba Amuquandoh
- Trey Anthony
- Nicole Arbour
- Jann Arden
- Will Arnett
- Lauren Ash
- Brandon Ash-Mohammed
- Dan Aykroyd
- Peter Aykroyd
- Yank Azman

=== B ===
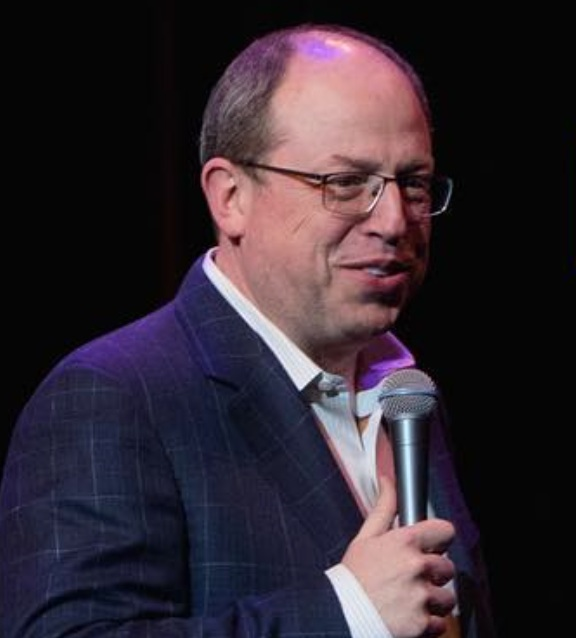
Brent Butt performing at Casino Regina

- Rachid Badouri
- Ali Badshah
- Ian Bagg
- Bob Bainborough
- Rupan Bal
- Boyd Banks
- John Barbour
- Irwin Barker
- Alexandre Barrette
- Michel Barrette
- Jay Baruchel
- Sandra Battaglini
- Eric Bauza
- Jennifer Baxter
- Samantha Bee
- Ahren Belisle
- Tracey Bell
- Ryan Belleville
- Paul Bellini
- Carolyn Bennett
- Vincent Bilodeau
- Tricia Black
- Ben Blue
- Joe Bodolai
- Al Boliska
- Michael Boncoeur
- Ian Boothby
- Trevor Boris
- Ashley Botting
- Pierre Brassard
- David Andrew Brent
- Mark Breslin
- Dave Broadfoot
- Lois Bromfield
- Valri Bromfield
- Martin Bronstein
- Aisha Brown
- Aurora Browne
- Kyle Brownrigg
- Sophie Buddle
- Mike Bullard
- Pat Bullard
- Howard Busgang
- Ernie Butler
- Brent Butt

=== C ===
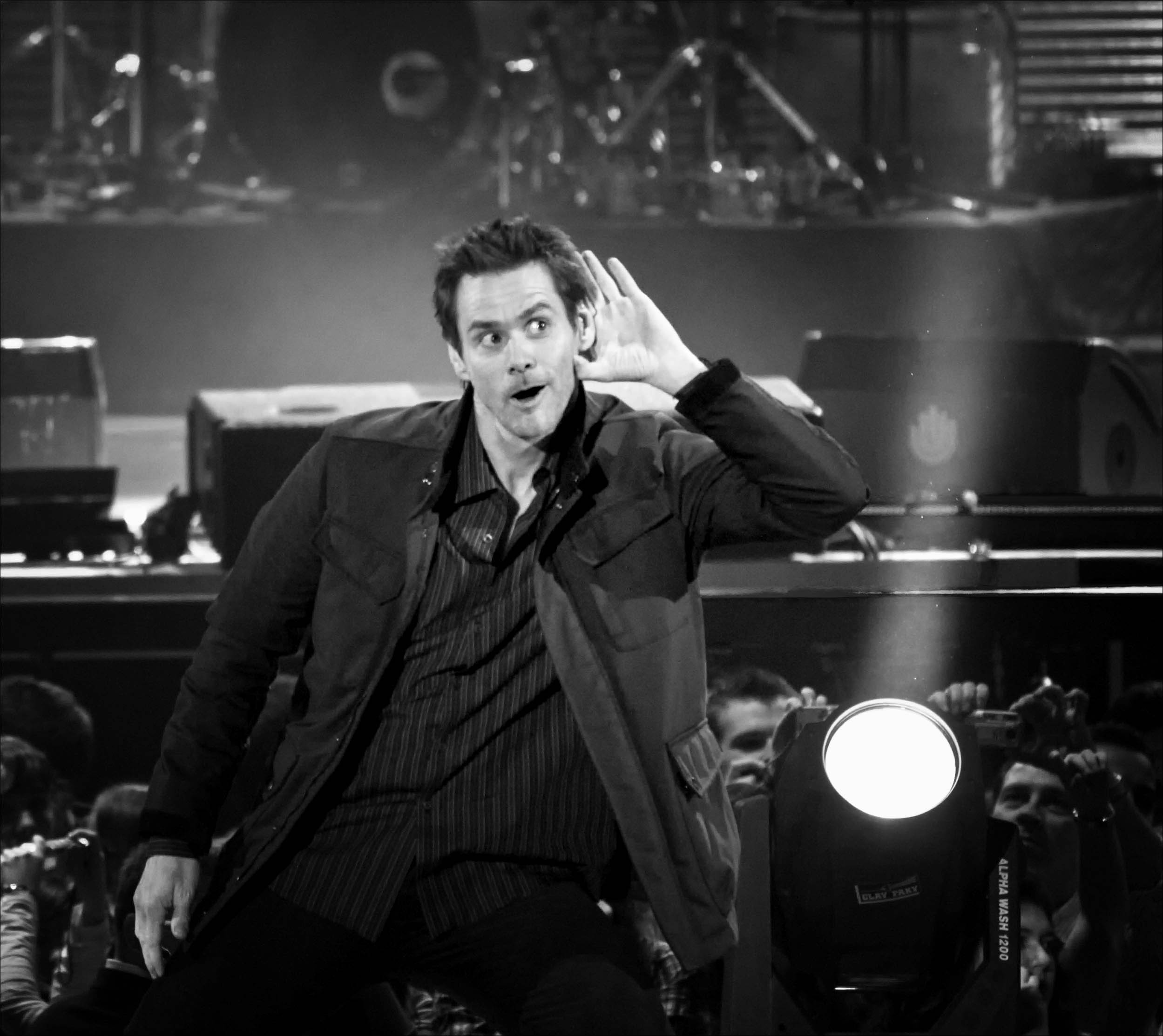
Jim Carrey performing in Spain

- Inga Cadranel
- Jesse Camacho
- Craig Campbell
- Jarrett Campbell
- Tommy Campbell
- John Candy
- Bill Carr
- Jim Carrey
- Maggie Cassella
- John Catucci
- Michael Cera
- Ajahnis Charley
- Paul Chato
- Martha Chaves
- Boris Cherniak
- Jonas Chernick
- Graham Chittenden
- Tommy Chong
- Michel Choquette
- Adam Christie
- Vince Matthew Chung
- Gay Claitman
- Graham Clark
- Véronique Claveau
- Carla Collins
- Kurtis Conner
- Penelope Corrin
- Michel Courtemanche
- Susan Coyne
- Gavin Crawford
- Stéphane Crête
- Mark Critch
- Jonathan Crombie
- Neil Crone
- Steven Crowder
- Katie Crown
- Peter Cullen
- Seán Cullen
- James Cunningham
- Ken Cuperus

=== D ===
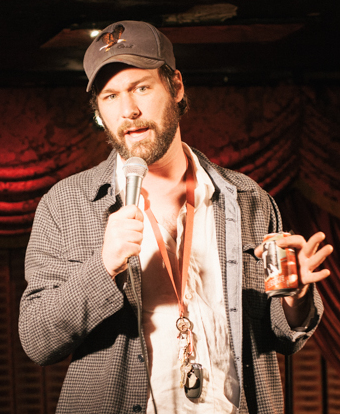
Jon Dore performing for Comedy Central

- Ola Dada
- Anesti Danelis
- Roman Danylo
- Dashan, born Mark Rowswell
- Tracy Dawson
- Ivan Decker
- Gerry Dee
- Jason Deline
- Eddie Della Siepe
- Charles Demers
- D.J. Demers
- Darrell Dennis
- Yvon Deschamps
- Seán Devlin
- Chris Diamantopoulos
- Debra DiGiovanni
- J.R. Digs
- Dan Dillabough
- Dini Dimakos
- Melissa DiMarco
- David Dineen-Porter
- Jon Dore
- Ryan Doucette
- Zabrina Douglas
- Harry Doupe
- Nigel Downer
- Jo-Anna Downey
- André Ducharme
- Rick Ducommun
- Jack Duffy
- Robin Duke
- Marc Dupré
- Steve Dylan

=== E ===
- Sam Easton
- Derek Edwards
- Ophira Eisenberg
- Laurie Elliott
- Lorne Elliott
- Anke Engelke
- Ennis Esmer
- Izad Etemadi
- Fred Ewanuick

=== F ===
- Darrell Faria
- Anthony Q. Farrell
- Mark Farrell
- Marypat Farrell
- Scott Faulconbridge
- Don Ferguson
- Crystal Ferrier
- Nathan Fielder
- Jebb Fink
- Chris Finn
- Diane Flacks
- Joe Flaherty
- Jordan Foisy
- Dave Foley
- Virginie Fortin
- Mark Forward
- Heidi Foss
- Glen Foster
- Michael J. Fox
- Stewart Francis
- Matt Frewer
- Darren Frost
- Ajay Fry
- Pier-Luc Funk
- Cass Furman

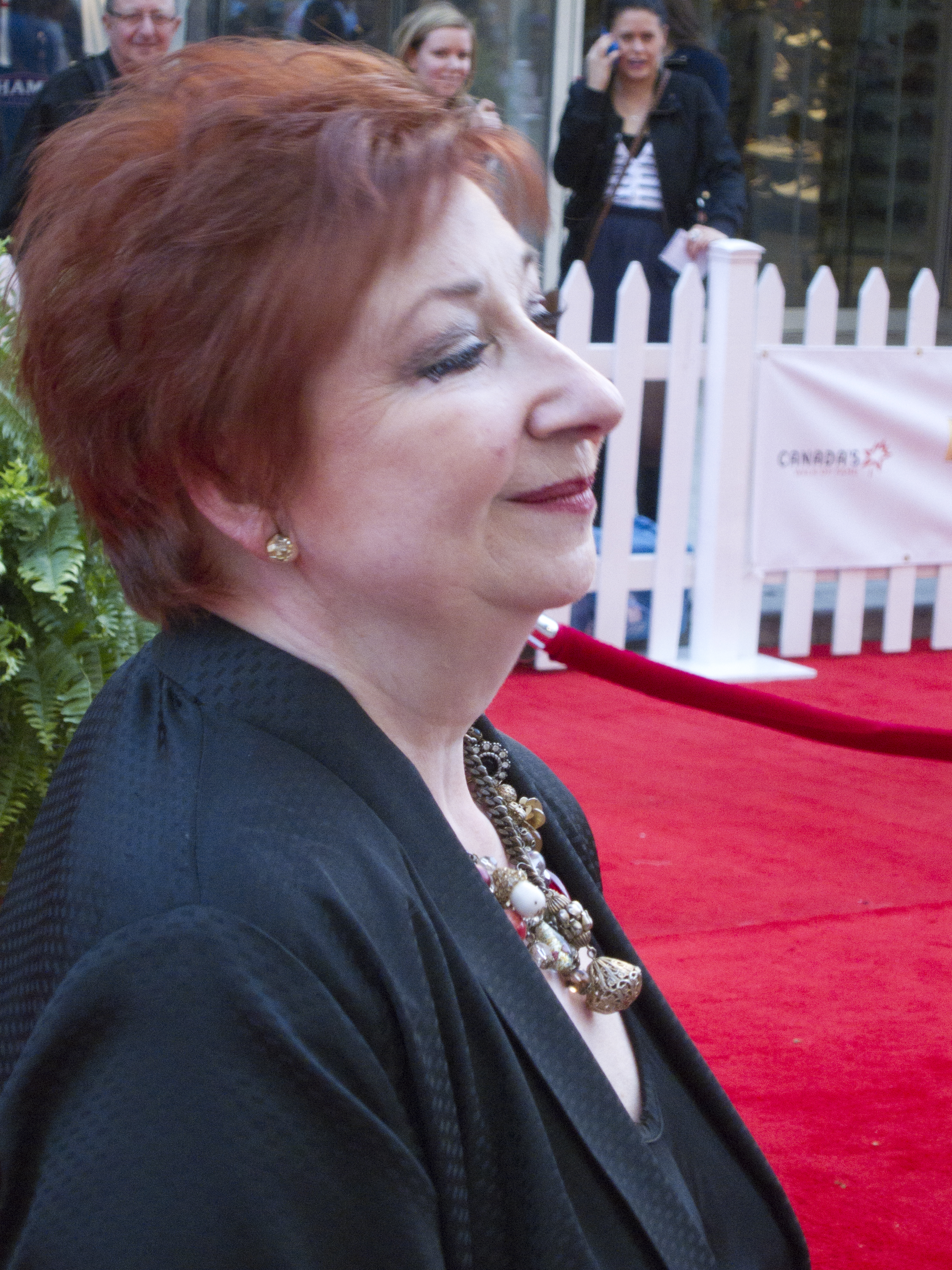
Luba Goy at Canada's Walk of Fame

=== G ===
- André-Philippe Gagnon
- Mayce Galoni
- Holly Gauthier-Frankel
- Kevin Gillese
- Courtney Gilmour
- Nadia Giosia
- Stephen Kramer Glickman
- Shirley Gnome
- Amy Goodmurphy
- Mickaël Gouin
- Luba Goy
- Janet van de Graaf
- Todd Graham
- David Granirer
- Brooks Gray
- Deven Green
- Rick Green
- Tom Green
- Kathy Greenwood
- Adam Growe

=== H ===
- Brandon Hackett
- Kristeen von Hagen
- Dean Haglund
- Geri Hall
- Barbara Hamilton
- Allana Harkin
- Jonny Harris
- Don Harron
- Phil Hartman
- Brian Hartt
- Ellie Harvie
- Ali Hassan
- Dakota Ray Hebert
- John Hemphill
- Ed Hill
- Matt Hill
- Darryl Hinds
- Salma Hindy
- Karen Hines
- Norm Hiscock
- Shawn Hitchins
- Julia Hladkowicz
- Jessica Holmes
- Jeremy Hotz
- Kenny Hotz
- Louis-José Houde
- Albert Howell
- Patrick Huard
- Bruce Hunter
- Emma Hunter
- Faris Hytiaa

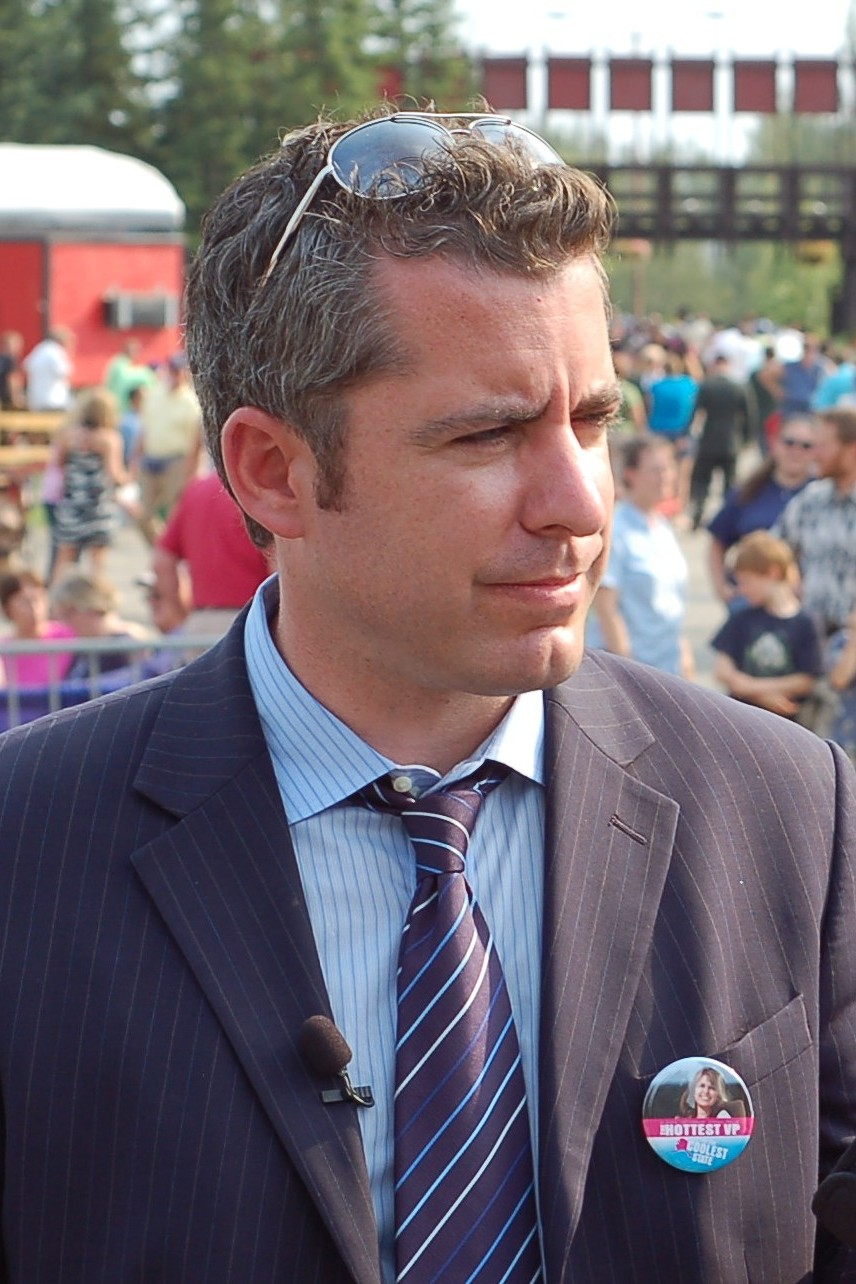
Jason Jones preparing a field piece for The Daily Show

=== I ===
- Jennifer Irwin
- Steve Ivings

=== J ===
- Sabrina Jalees
- Ron James
- Garihanna Jean-Louis
- Andrea Jin
- Sandy Jobin-Bevans
- Becky Johnson
- Andrew Johnston
- Andy Jones
- Cathy Jones
- Daryn Jones
- Jason Jones
- Jenny Jones
- Rick Jones
- Ron Josol

=== K ===
- Vinnie Karetak
- Anthony Kavanagh
- Edward Kay
- Graham Kay
- Peter Kelamis
- Susan Kent
- Steven Joel Kerzner
- Deborah Kimmett
- Simon King
- Paul Kligman
- Rebecca Kohler
- Elvira Kurt

=== L ===
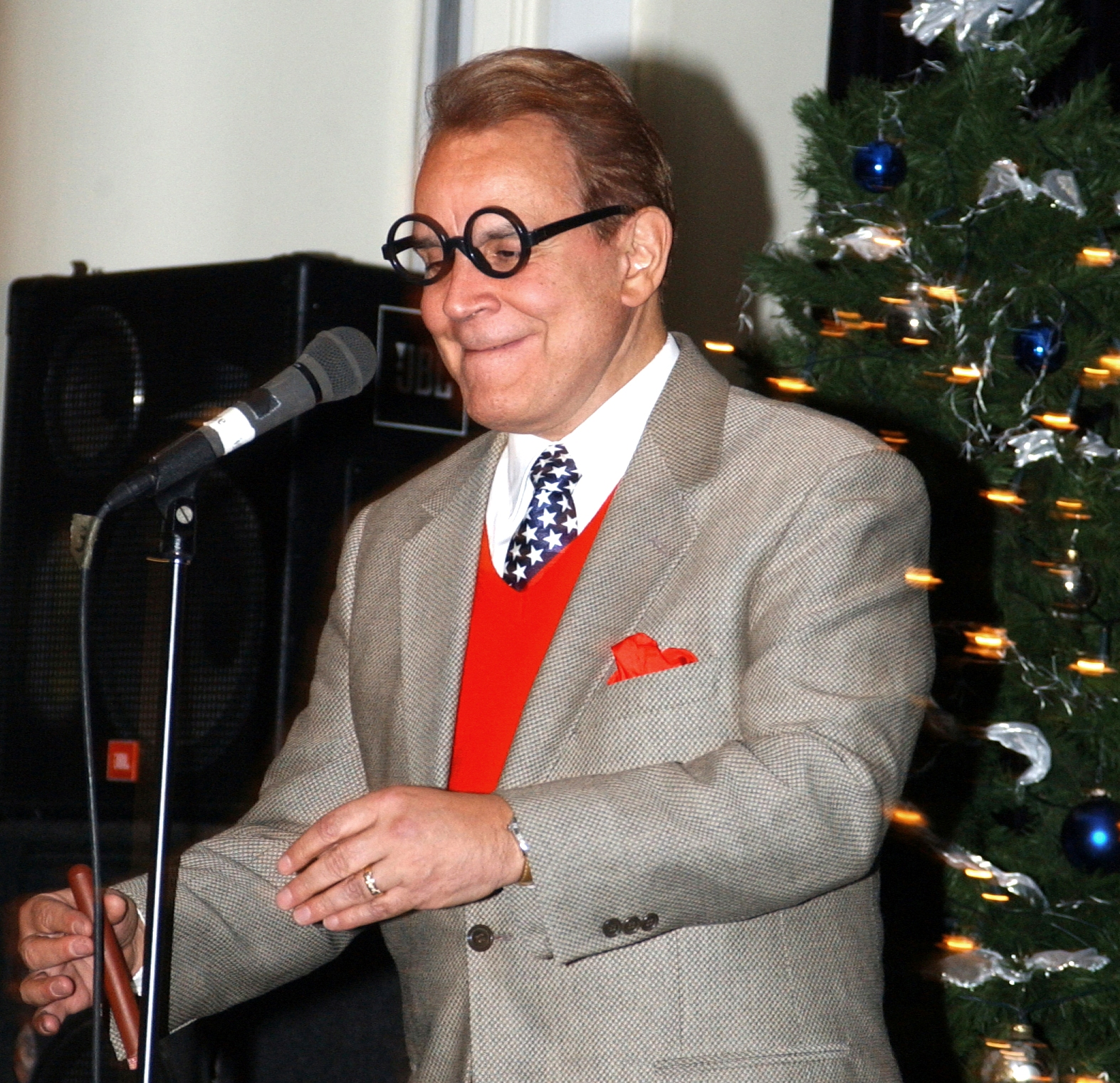
Rich Little performing for the US Air Force

- Kris LaBelle
- Jon Lajoie
- Jeremy Lalonde
- Maurice LaMarche
- Lisa Lambert
- Mado Lamotte
- Laura Landauer
- Bruno Landry
- Jonathan Langdon
- Jean Lapointe
- Philippe-Audrey Larrue-Saint-Jacques
- Gilles Latulippe
- Michel Lauzière
- Craig Lauzon
- Tony Law
- Chas Lawther
- Patrick Ledwell
- Paul Sun-Hyung Lee
- Claude Legault
- Julie Lemieux
- Sylvia Lennick
- Guy A. Lepage
- Gaston Leroux
- Caroline Lesley
- Dan Lett
- Dan Levy
- Eugene Levy
- Alan Shane Lewis
- Travis Lindsay
- Natalie Lisinska
- Mark Little
- Rich Little
- Chris Locke
- Marito Lopez
- Kayla Lorette
- Gilson Lubin
- Marla Lukofsky
- Doris Lussier
- Brittany Lyseng

=== M ===
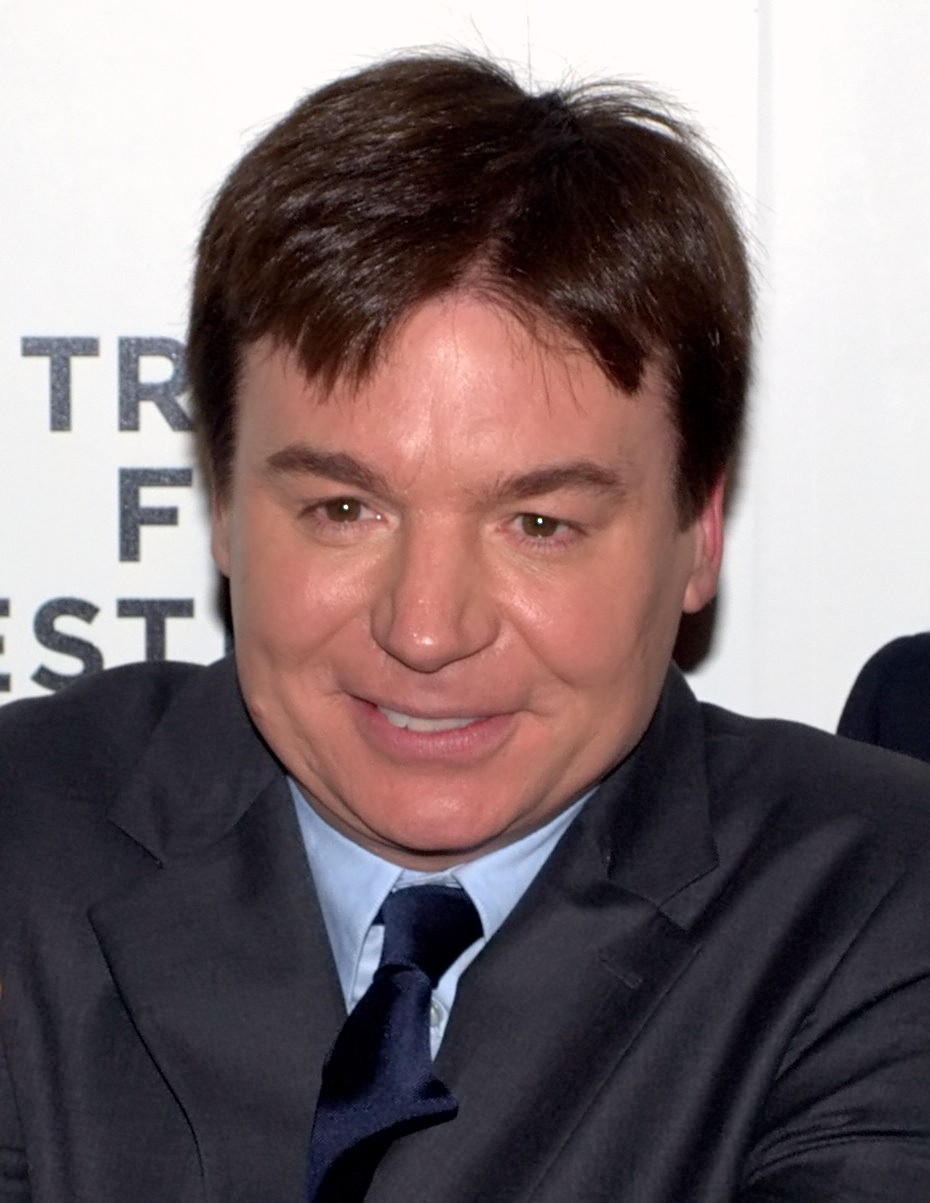
Mike Myers at the Tribeca Film Festival

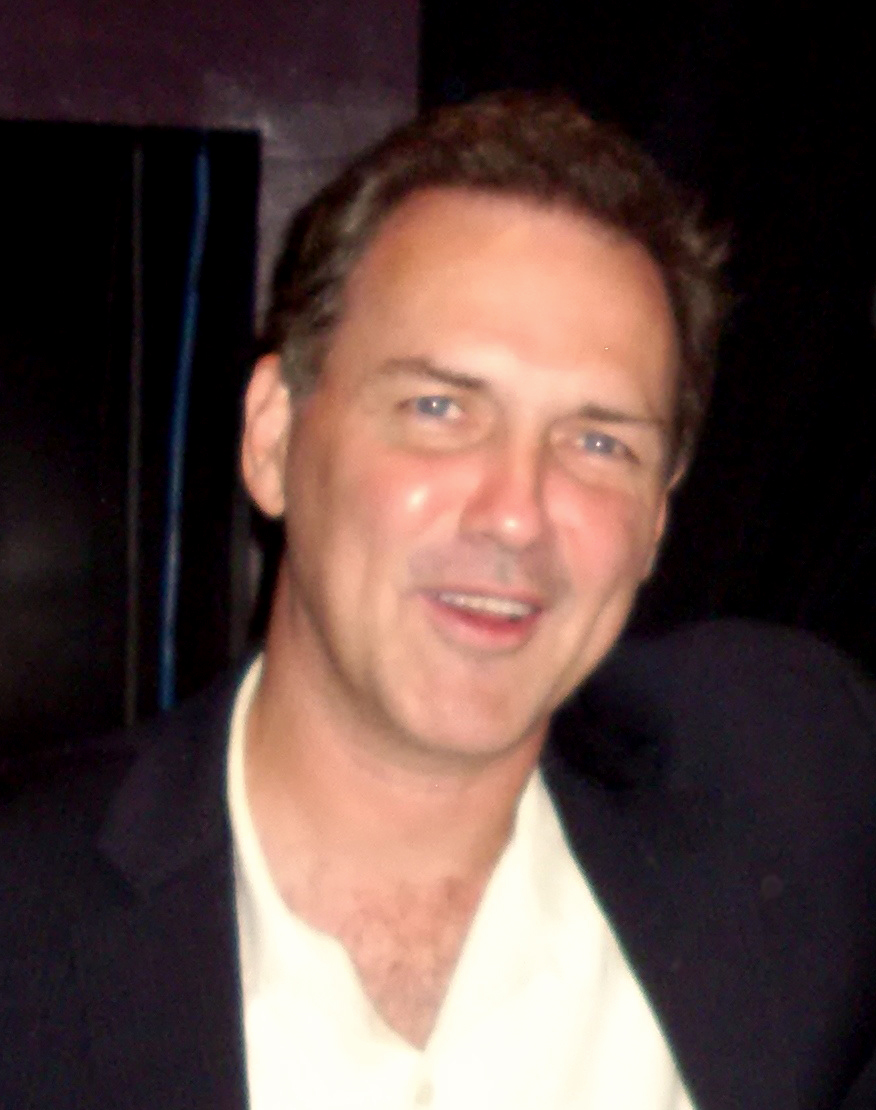
Norm Macdonald

- Bette MacDonald
- Mike MacDonald
- Norm Macdonald
- Shane MacDougall
- Nathan Macintosh
- Cory Mack
- Meredith MacNeill
- Michael Magee
- Hassan Mahbouba
- Bobby Mair
- Shaun Majumder
- Greg Malone
- Jay Malone
- Howie Mandel
- Dylan Mandlsohn
- Chanty Marostica
- Andrea Martin
- Bob Martin
- Mae Martin
- Boman "Bomanizer" Martinez-Reid
- Paul Mather
- Martin Matte
- Amy Matysio
- Tim McAuliffe
- Peter McBain
- Trent McClellan
- Jordan McCloskey
- Clare McConnell
- Kelly McCormack
- Drew McCreadie
- Bruce McCulloch
- Kevin McDonald
- Wade McElwain
- Jeff McEnery
- Bonnie McFarlane
- Kathleen McGee
- Debra McGrath
- Stacey McGunnigle
- Terry McGurrin
- Don McKellar
- Patrick McKenna
- Duncan McKenzie
- Mark McKinney
- Stuart McLean
- Ryan McMahon
- Mark Meer
- Wendel Meldrum
- Rick Mercer
- Lisa Merchant
- Claudine Mercier
- Jean-François Mercier
- Dave Merheje
- Darcy Michael
- Lorne Michaels
- Dominique Michel
- Gabrielle Miller
- Rick Miller
- Colin Mochrie
- Niki Mohrdar
- Alice Moran
- Rick Moranis
- Doug Morency
- John Morgan
- Jordi Morgan
- Maynard Morrison
- Tyler Morrison
- Kirby Morrow
- James Mullinger
- Mike Myers

=== N ===
- Briane Nasimok
- Zarqa Nawaz
- Nick Nemeroff
- Phil Nichol
- Leslie Nielsen
- Rebecca Northan
- Alex Nussbaum
- Dave Nystrom

=== O ===
- Matt O'Brien
- Catherine O'Hara
- Peter Oldring
- Paul O'Sullivan
- Rose Ouellette
- Chris Owens

=== P ===
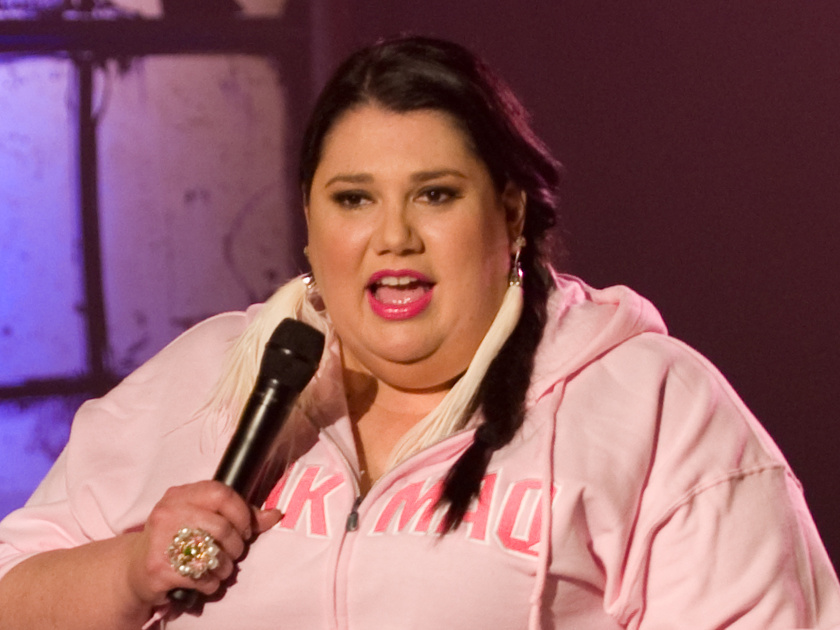
Candy Palmater performing The Candy Show

- Candy Palmater
- Laurent Paquin
- Ron Pardo
- Alan Park
- Pardis Parker
- Steve Patterson
- Teresa Pavlinek
- Nikki Payne
- Christina Pazsitzky
- Allie Pearse
- Gary Pearson
- Ron Pederson
- Keith Pedro
- Renee Percy
- Matthew Perry
- François Pérusse
- Russell Peters
- Eric Peterson
- Martin Petit
- Kathleen Phillips
- Andrew Phung
- Andrew Pifko
- Joze Piranian
- Jackie Pirico
- Nestor Pistor
- Sarah Polley
- Ann Pornel
- Tim Progosh

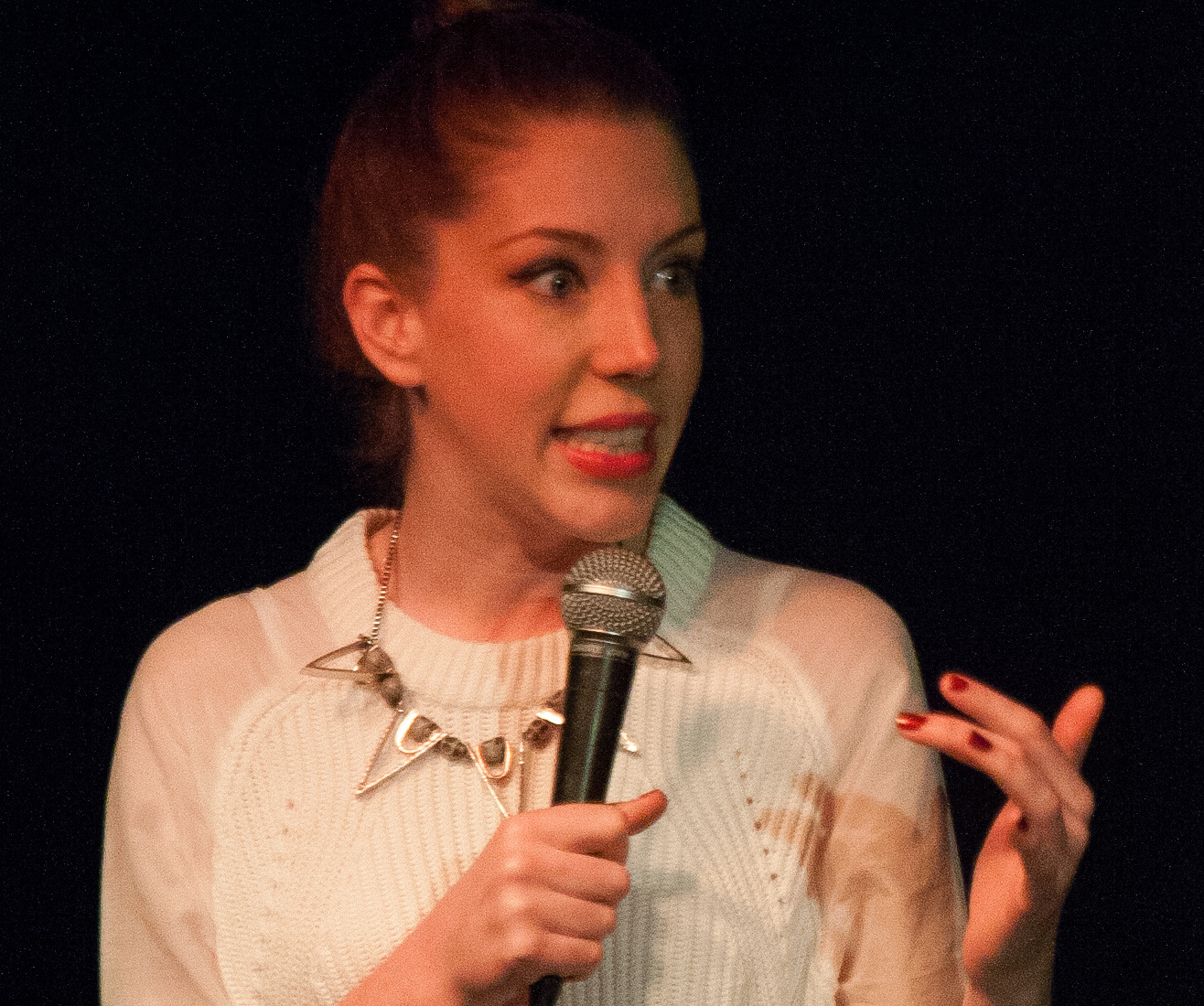
Katherine Ryan

=== Q ===
- Quick Dick McDick

=== R ===
- Paul Rabliauskas
- Rosemary Radcliffe
- Lara Rae
- Simon Rakoff
- Laura Ramoso
- Aaron Read
- Dan Redican
- Jus Reign
- Ryan Reynolds
- Nick Reynoldson
- Caroline Rhea
- Spencer Rice
- Edward Riche
- Jennifer Robertson
- Nancy Robertson
- Chris Robinson
- Kenny Robinson
- Seth Rogen
- Darrin Rose
- Evany Rosen
- Jamillah Ross
- Stéphane Rousseau
- Stéphane E. Roy
- Les Rubie
- Mag Ruffman
- Richard Ryder

=== S ===
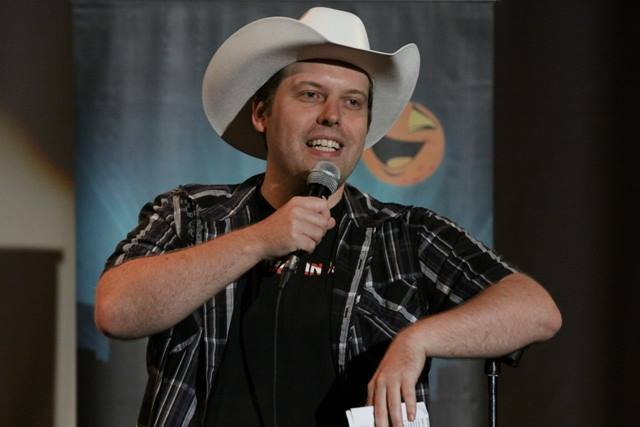
Ron Sparks at the YYComedy Festival

- Ed Sahely
- Mort Sahl
- Tabitha St. Germain
- Jess Salomon
- Josh Saltzman
- Sugar Sammy
- Jacob Samuel
- Chris Sandiford
- Jay Sankey
- Will Sasso
- Leo Scherman
- Ken Scott
- Monty Scott
- Sterling Scott
- Derek Seguin
- Nile Séguin
- Tommy Sexton
- Jeff Seymour
- Sandra Shamas
- Steven Shehori
- Martin Short
- Frank Shuster
- Kris Siddiqi
- Erica Sigurdson
- Arthur Simeon
- Tim Sims
- Lilly Singh
- Richard Z. Sirois
- Ian Sirota
- Lee Smart
- DeAnne Smith
- Morag Smith
- Steve Smith
- Naomi Snieckus
- Snook
- Ron Sparks
- Winston Spear
- Tom Stade
- Tim Steeves
- David Steinberg
- Gavin Stephens
- Ryan Stiles
- Raymond Storey
- Janine Sutto

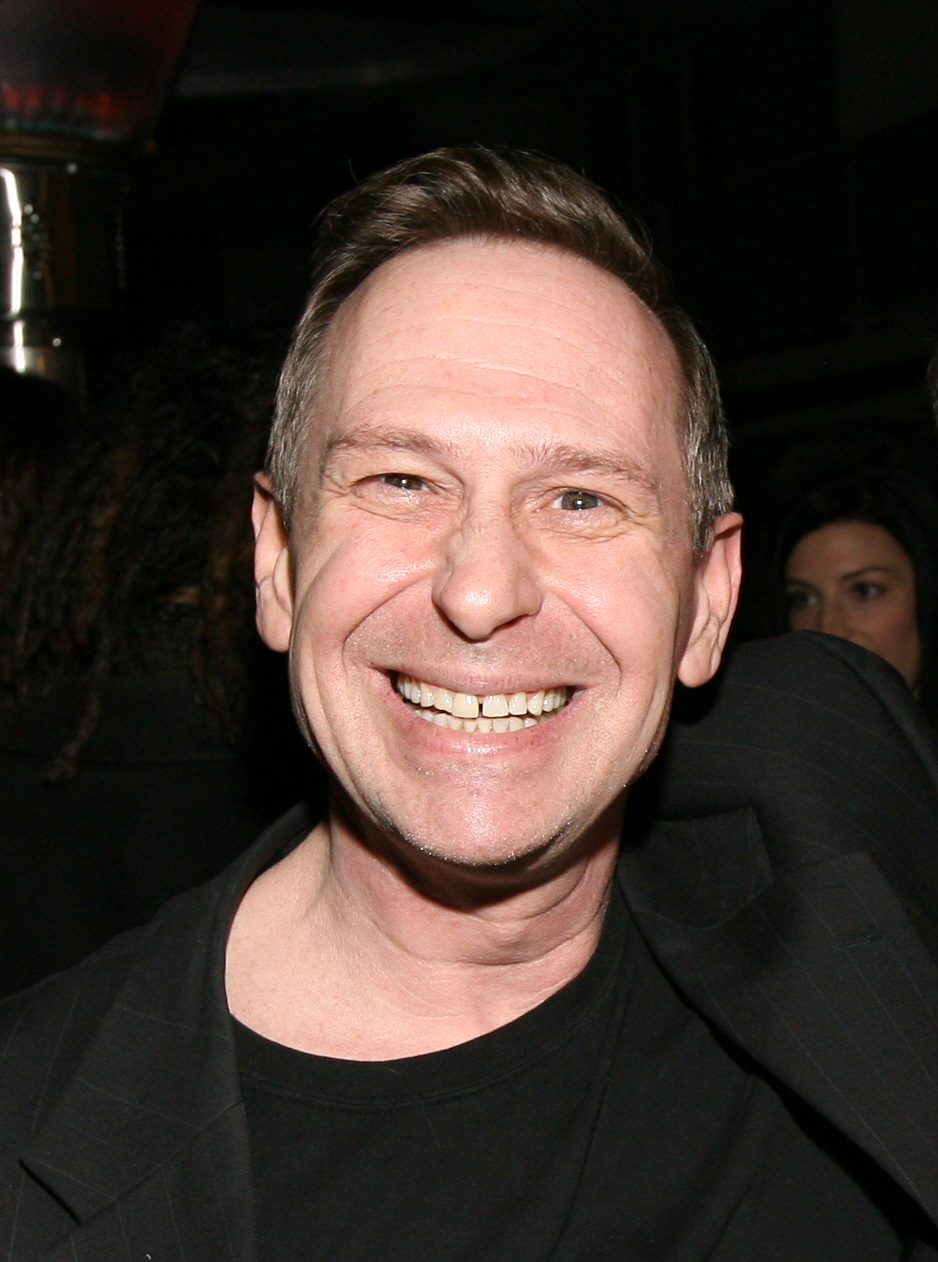
Scott Thompson

=== T ===
- Gordie Tapp
- Carolyn Taylor
- Alan Thicke
- Dave Thomas
- Kwasi Thomas
- Greg Thomey
- Scott Thompson
- Pat Thornton
- Jacob Tierney
- Steph Tolev
- Jackie Torrens
- Jonathan Torrens
- Angelo Tsarouchas
- Eric Tunney

=== U ===
- The Unknown Comic

=== V ===
- Ava Val
- Billy Van
- Taz VanRassel
- Ron Vaudry
- Michael Venus
- Kevin Vidal

=== W ===
- Mary Walsh
- Connie Wang
- Dave Ward
- Mike Ward
- Morgan Waters
- Robert Watson
- Matt Watts
- Johnny Wayne
- Dave Weasel
- Robb Wells
- George Westerholm
- Jennifer Whalen
- Nancy White
- Jason John Whitehead
- Peter Wildman
- Elyse Willems
- Harland Williams
- Paul K. Willis
- Mike Wilmot
- Chris Wilson
- Jonathan Wilson
- K. Trevor Wilson
- Mark Wilson
- John Wing, Jr.
- Tranna Wintour
- Daniel Woodrow
- Glenn Wool
- Matt Wright

=== Y ===
- Bowen Yang
- Scott Yaphe
- Alan Young
- Fraser Young
- Andrew Younghusband
- Hannan Younis

=== Z ===
- Pete Zedlacher
- Richardson Zéphir

=== Duos ===
- Bob and Doug McKenzie
- Bowser and Blue
- Crampe en masse
- Double Exposure
- Life of a Craphead
- MacLean & MacLean
- Morro and Jasp
- Mump and Smoot
- The Ryan and Amy Show
- Smith & Smith
- The Sufferettes
- Tracy & Martina
- Wayne and Shuster

=== Troupes ===
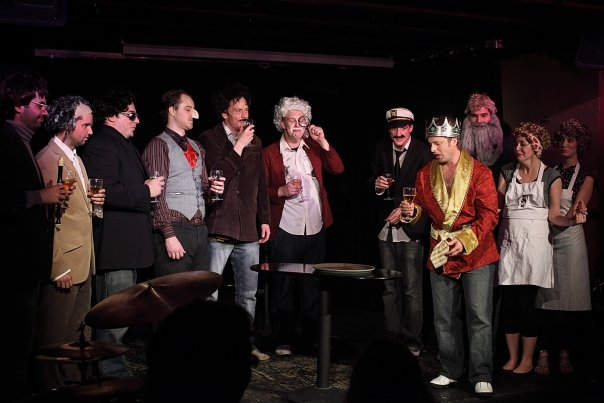
The Sketchersons performing at Toronto's Comedy Bar

- The Arrogant Worms
- The B-Girlz
- Baroness von Sketch Show
- The Bobroom
- The Chumps
- CODCO
- Die-Nasty
- The Frantics
- Hot Thespian Action
- IFHT
- The Kids in the Hall
- The Minnesota Wrecking Crew
- Mostly Water Theatre
- Picnicface
- Rapid Fire Theatre
- Rock et Belles Oreilles
- Royal Canadian Air Farce
- The Second City
- The Sketchersons
- TallBoyz
- Three Dead Trolls in a Baggie
- Trailer Park Boys
- The Vestibules
- Women Fully Clothed
- Les Zapartistes

== See also ==
- Canadian humour
- List of comedians
  - List of Quebec comedians
