= Canadian Association of Stand-up Comedians =

Professional association

The Canadian Association of Stand-up Comedians (CASC) is a professional association which advocates for stand-up comedians in Canada. It was founded in 2017 and incorporated as a non-profit organization in 2019. Its chief efforts have been to have stand-up comedy recognized as an art form and to remove barriers for Canadian stand-ups to perform in the United States. In 2025, CASC made a partnership with the Canadian Freelance Union, providing access to contract advice and health benefits.

== Establishment ==
In 2016, comedian Sandra Battaglini wrote an open letter to the Canadian prime minister, asking his help to remove obstacles for Canadian comedians to work in the United States. The letter received significant attention from the comedy community and Battaglini was encouraged to organize for a stronger voice. In 2017 Battaglini, Johanne Britton, and a few other comics founded the Canadian Association of Stand-up Comedians (CASC). By 2018, CASC had 600 members.

CASC looked to the Canadian music industry as an example, hoping to achieve the government focus the music industry received in the 1980s and 1990s.

CASC organized a 4000-signature petition requesting that comedy be considered an art form, which was presented to the House of Commons by MP Julie Dabrusin on 24 September 2018.

In May 2019, CASC was incorporated as a non-profit organization. It then included sketch and improv comedy artists, and has sometimes been referred to as the Canadian Association of Stand-up, Sketch and Improv Comedians, but remains largely known by its original name.

== Lobbying ==
CASC's federal lobbying efforts have had two main goals: to gain Canada Arts Council recognition of stand-up comedy as an art form, and to remove barriers for Canadian stand-ups to perform in the United States. From 2018 to 2021, lobbyists were registered for this activity.

Recognition of stand-up comedy as an art form would allow comedians to apply for touring grants and album creation grants. While it is suggested that stand-ups apply for funding as theatre artists, their acts do not fit these structures and have been rejected as ineligible for consideration. CASC was able to present testimony of this to the Standing Committee on Canadian Heritage on 4 June 2019.

There exists considerable inequality of treatment of Canadian comedians and their American counterparts in crossing the border to work in the other country. Canadians must prove that they are in the top 1 to 2 percent of their field or cite a major deal with a US company, and have a sponsor who will petition on their behalf. Additionally, three-year work visas for the United States cost five to ten thousand US dollars. There are no such barriers for American comedians working in Canada. (Note: According to CASC, an American comedian wishing to perform in Canada typically requires a permit that costs about 230 Canadian dollars, 20 to 50 times less than is required for Canadians performing in the United States.) It was lobbied to challenge these barriers under the North American Free Trade Agreement (NAFTA) and its successor agreements.

CASC has also lobbied for funding for the non-profit Foundation for Canadian Comedy (CANCOM), to include spoken-word arts in the Copyright Act and to participate in modernization of the Broadcasting Act, and for federally funded comedy events to prominently feature Canadian comedians. (Note: Just For Laughs, which received federal funding for its comedy festivals, was purchased by an American concern in 2018 and immediately reduced representation of Canadian acts – the 2018 Toronto festival lineup had only 3 domestic acts out of 42 total.)

== Other efforts ==
In February 2019, Just For Laughs (JFL) partnered with SiriusXM channel 168 Canada Laughs, rebranding the channel with a programming change to JFL archival content featuring international artists. The channel had previously exclusively broadcast original Canadian content, providing income directly to Canadian comedy artists, in some cases being their primary source of income. CASC led efforts to rally the comedy community, organize town hall meetings, and coordinate with the media – gaining press coverage across North America. As a result of the campaign, the partnership reversed its programming decision, returning to Canadian content.

During the COVID-19 pandemic, CASC shifted much of its activity toward an emergency fund for comedians who were out of work.

In April 2025, CASC announced a partnership with the Canadian Freelance Union (CFU, a chapter of Unifor), providing its members access to services for freelance artists such as contract advice and health benefits. Later that year, Unifor sent a press release to its chapters, recommending that they hire CASC comedians for union local events to support their union community.

In a 2025 interview, CASC president Clifford Myers noted that comedians from other countries had contacted CASC for advice on organizing, and that CASC was creating an open-source resource hub to aid in creating and building stand-up associations internationally.

== In media ==
Battaglini and CASC are featured in the 2021 documentary film The Mayor of Comedy: A Canadian Stand-Up Story.
