= Zabrina =

Zabrina may refer to:

- Zabrina (beetle), insect subtribe that contains the Zabrus genus of ground beetles
- Zabrina Douglas (Zabrina Chevannes), Canadian stand-up comedian
- Zabrina Fernandez, Malaysian television producer
