= Todd Graham (comedian) =

Canadian comedian and filmmaker

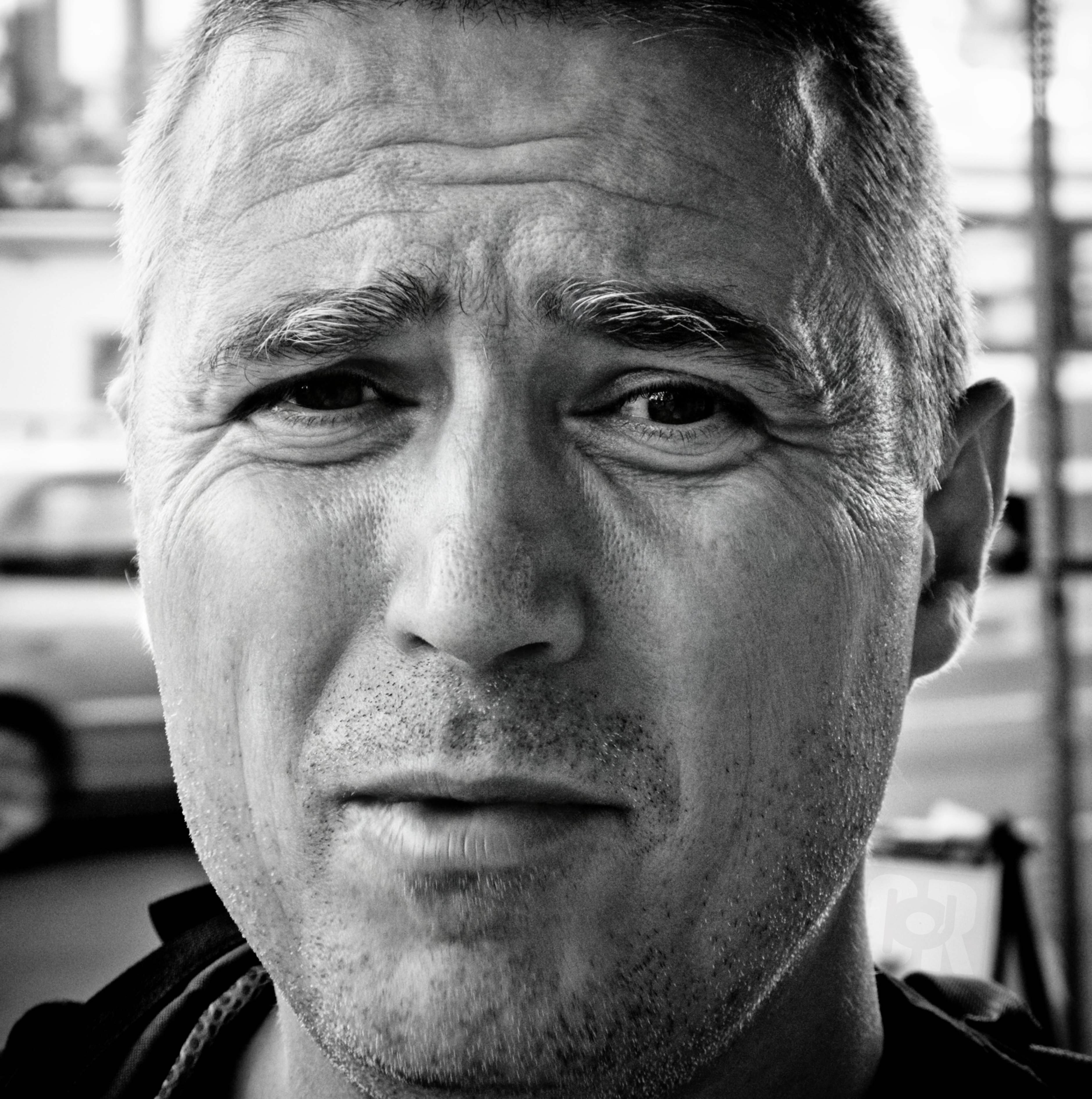
- Graham in 2017
- Born: Todd Graham; August 27, 1965 (age 61); Peterborough, Ontario, Canada
- Education: OCAD University
- Occupations: Comedian; Filmmaker
- Years active: 1987–present
- Website: idiotgallant.com

Todd Graham is a Canadian comedian and filmmaker best known for creating the cult 1987 short film, Apocalypse Pooh, a bizarrely comedic mash-up of Disney's Winnie the Pooh and Francis Ford Coppola's 1979 Vietnam War epic Apocalypse Now.

== Life and career ==
Graham was born in Peterborough, Ontario, and attended OCAD University in Toronto.

Graham has performed at the Winnipeg Comedy Festival, JFL 42, and Just For Laughs. His debut album, Bustin' Loose!, was released on Comedy Records in 2019 and supported by a record store tour throughout Toronto. Todd is part of Comedy Records' roster and was featured on the label's 10 Year Anniversary album.

== Accolades ==
His Just for Laughs: All Access show was nominated in 2017 for Best Taped Live Performance at the Canadian Comedy Awards.

== Film works ==
In 1987, Graham created the 8-minute video Apocalypse Pooh, considered by many to be one of the earliest examples of a mashup video as it combines footage from Disney's Winnie the Pooh shorts (each directed by Wolfgang Reitherman, released between 1966 and 1977) with audio from Francis Ford Coppola's 1979 film Apocalypse Now. At emphatic moments, the juxtaposition is reversed, with Coppola's images accompanying Reitherman's soundtrack. He also made Blue Peanuts (a combination of the animated Peanuts specials and David Lynch's Blue Velvet) and Hey, It's the Anarchies (a mix of The Archies and The Sex Pistols). While his video works went underappreciated at art schools in his own country, they were received better in the US to the point of being shown in New York City's The Kitchen.

== Reception and legacy of Apocalypse Pooh ==
Scott Mackenzie of CineAction wrote in 2007 that the film was exemplary of the new avant garde, "a potent synthesis of the radical politics of the 1960s and 1970s with character animation Hollywood cinema at its most surreal and uncanny" as a vehicle to examine the "horror and allure [of the Vietnam War] in mainstream cinema". He also noted that the film came at a time when "barriers between media were disintegrating" and called it "the godparent of today's mash-ups". Ken Newman of Sight & Sound praised the film for being "brilliantly edited". The film is considered an underground cult movie whose reputation is based solely on the depth and scope of the bootleg video circuit. A digitally remastered version was completed and released online by producer Brad Bell in 2010.

== See also ==
- Comedy Records
- List of Canadian stand-up comedians
- Bring Me the Head of Charlie Brown - 1986 animated student film by Jim Reardon similar in content and context
