= Monty Scott =

Comedian

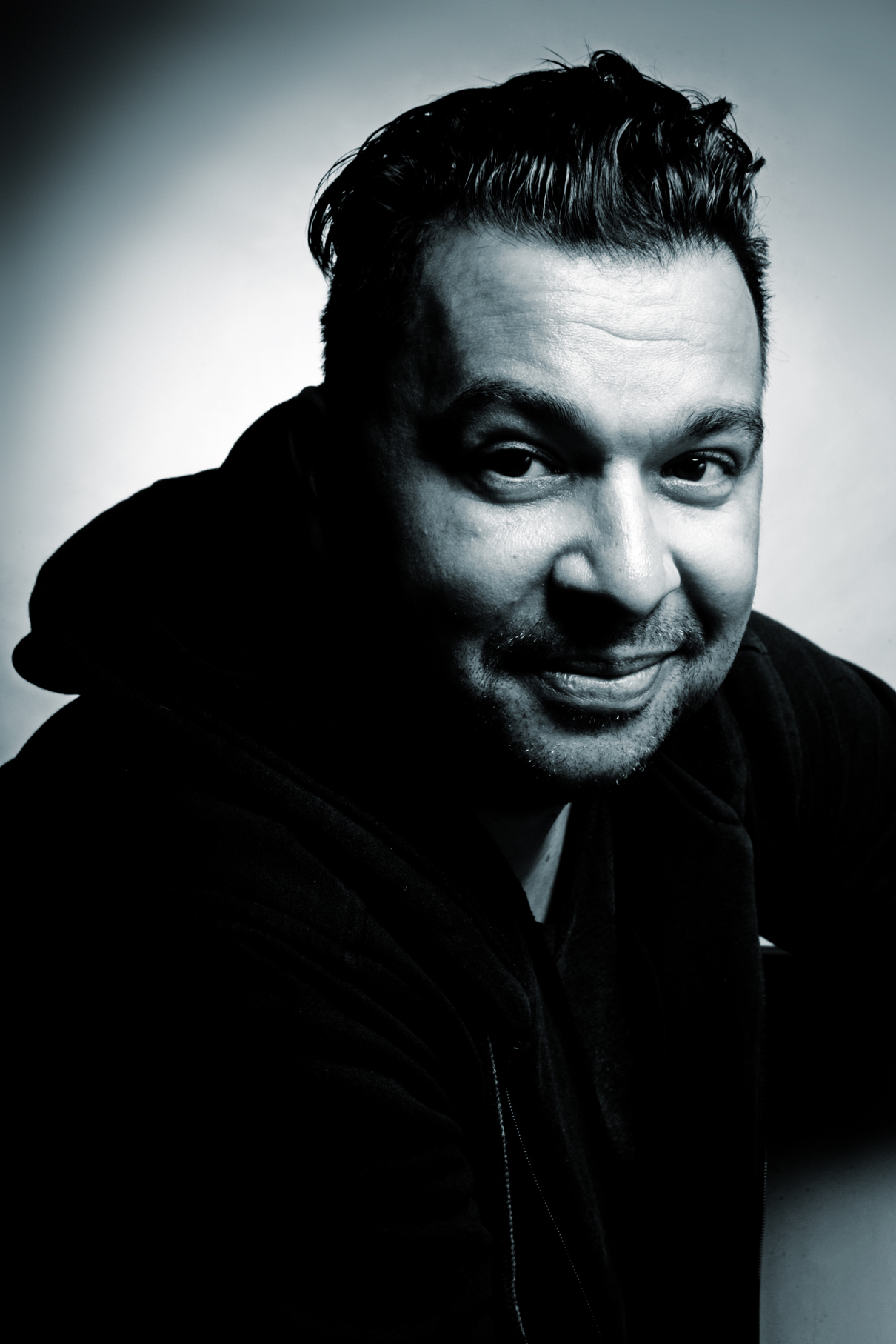
- Born: November 4, 1973 (age 51); Scarborough, Ontario, Canada
- Occupation: Comedian
- Years active: 2000–present
- Website: montyscott.com

Monty Scott is a Canadian stand-up comedian. He is most noted for his 2019 comedy album The Abyss Stares Back, which received a Juno Award nomination for Comedy Album of the Year at the Juno Awards of 2020. The album was inspired in part by his recovery from a 2018 injury caused by falling down the steps to his basement apartment. Scott spent two days in a coma following the fall.

Scott is an original member of Comedy Records' Roster and was featured on the label's 10 Year Anniversary Album.

== See also ==
- List of Canadian stand-up comedians
