= Nick Reynoldson =

Canadian stand-up comedian

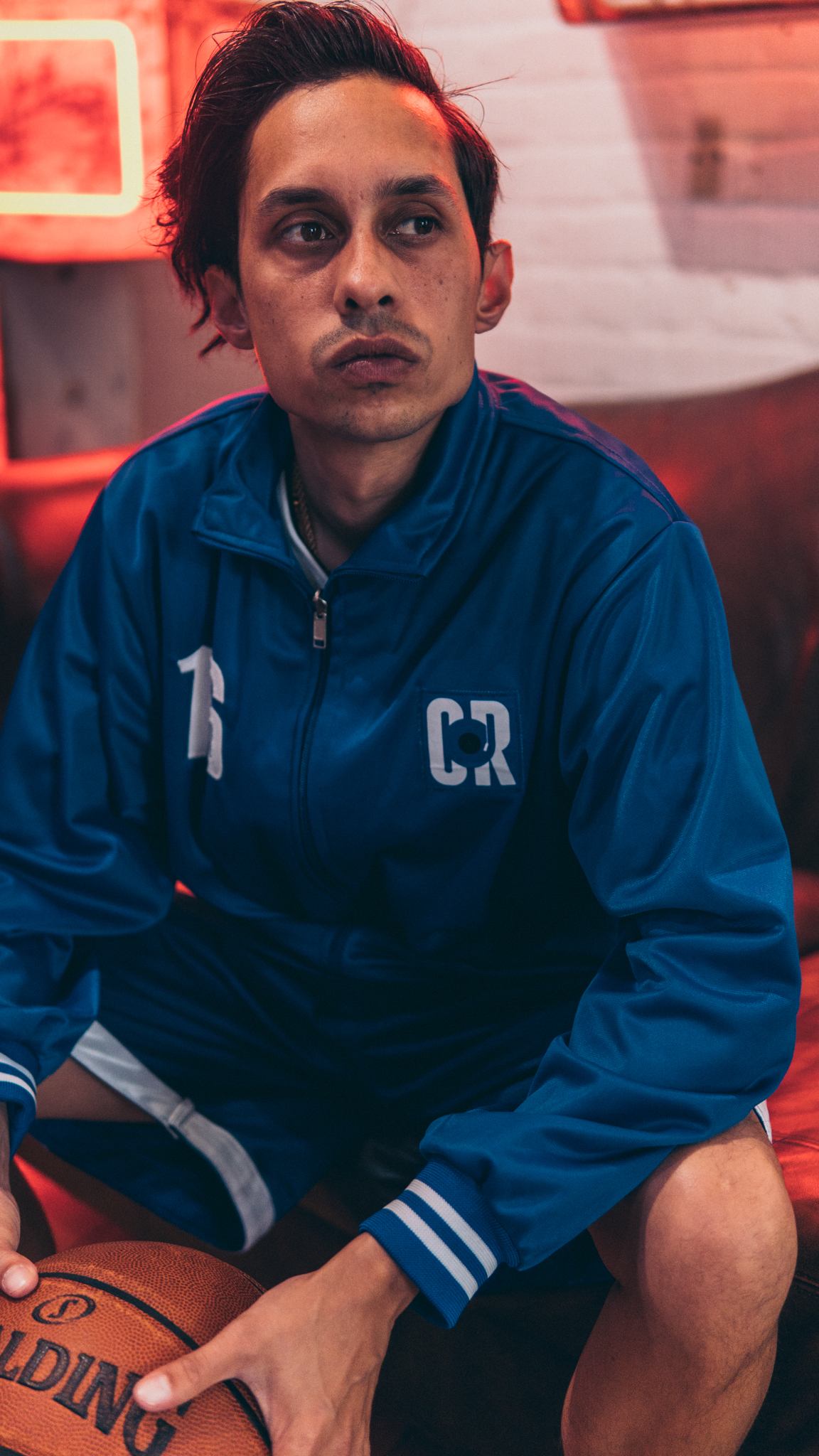
- Nick Reynoldson photo by Shanik Tanna
- Born: Scarborough, Ontario, Canada
- Occupations: Comedian, writer
- Years active: 2005–present
- Known for: Just for Laughs, Winnipeg Comedy Festival, Kevin Hart's LOL Network
- Website: www.nickreynoldson.com

Nick Reynoldson is a Canadian stand-up comedian and writer.

== Personal life ==
Reynoldson is a comedian born and raised in Scarborough, Ontario.

Exclaim Magazine called him “a staple of Toronto's comedy scene" during his New-Faces Showcase at JFL 42. Topics of Reynoldson's comedy include his mixed race identity, dating, animals and marine life.

Reynoldson first began with comedy during high school, after being given a CD of Def Comedy Jam sets.

== Career ==
In North America, Reynoldson has performed at colleges, comedy clubs, and universities and has been featured on national television including the Just For Laughs Festival, Kevin Hart’s LOL Network, JFL42 New- Faces, the Winnipeg Comedy Festival, NXNE, and others.

After touring the Canadian Organization of Campus Activities circuit in 2013, Reynoldson was nominated COCA Comedian of the Year.

In the summer of 2016, Reynoldson won Absolute Comedy’s annual Prove You're a Headliner competition. Reynoldson placed first out of nine contestants via audience majority vote for 11 straight performances. The following year, Reynoldson filmed and made his US comedy debut on Kevin Hart’s Laugh Out Loud Network, a comedy video network from comedian Kevin Hart and Lionsgate Films.

In 2018, Reynoldson was selected by SiriusXM and 59 of Canada's funniest comics to take part in the SiriusXM Top Comic Competition,

Nick Reynoldson was one of eight finalists and performed at the historic Winter Garden Theatre in Toronto. He placed as a runner-up, receiving a cash prize and securing spots in JFL42 (Toronto), JFL NorthWest (Vancouver), and returning to Montreal's Just for Laughs Festival. His comedy has been described as engaging, and self-deprecating.

== Other ventures ==
Reynoldson co-hosts a weekly (when in season) basketball podcast Talking Raptors on SoundCloud, ESPN's Raptors Republic, and Spotify with fellow comedian and Toronto Raptors fan Barry Taylor.

== See also ==
- List of Canadian comedians
- Comedy Records
