= Arthur Simeon =

Ugandan actor and comedian

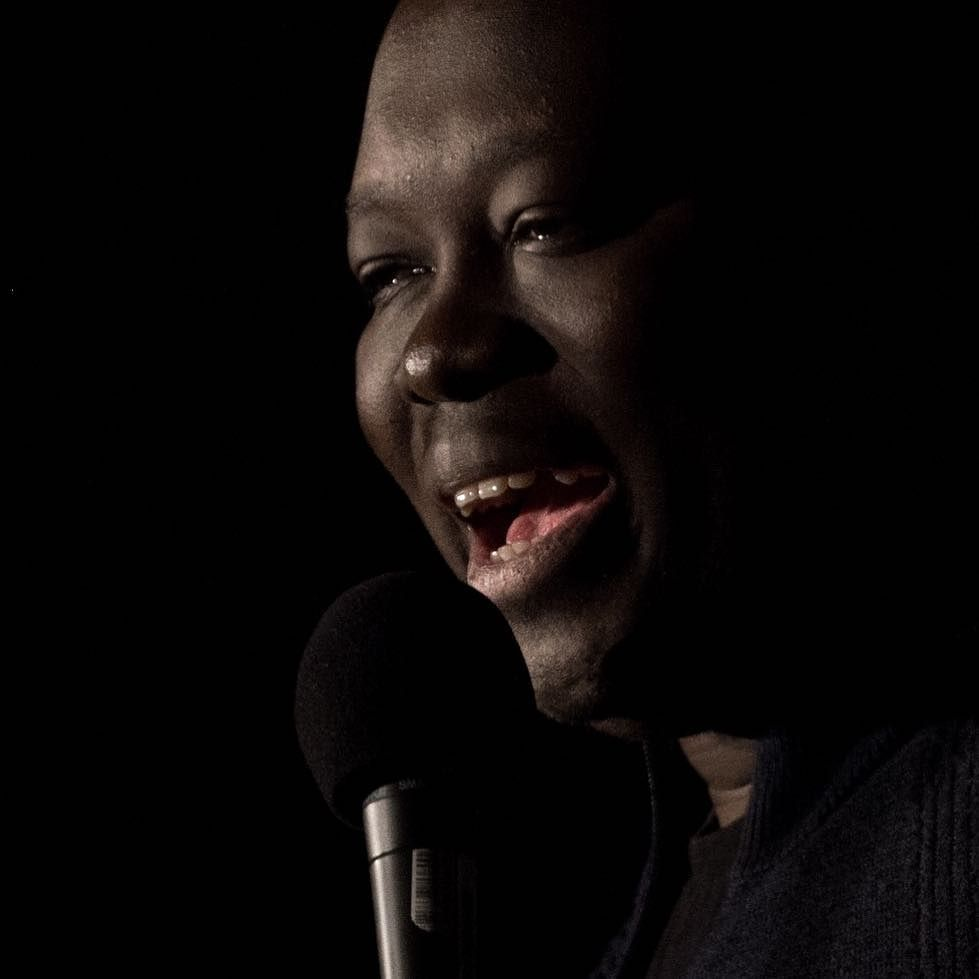
- Simeon in 2017
- Born: November 14, 1983 (age 42); Kampala, Uganda
- Education: Trent University
- Occupations: Comedian; Writer
- Years active: 2001–present
- Website: arthursimeon.com

Arthur Simeon is a stand-up comedian based in Toronto, Ontario, Canada. He was born in Kampala, Uganda on November 14, 1983 and attended the prestigious Namilyango College between 1996 and 2001. In the fall of 2001, Simeon moved to Canada to attend university in Peterborough, Ontario.

Simeon first tried stand-up comedy as a teenager while attending Trent University. He has performed multiple times at Just for Laughs and appeared on HBO and the Canadian Broadcasting Corporation.

In February 2010, Simeon was featured as the cover story of NOW in Toronto. His debut comedy album, Born and Raised, was released in 2014 on Comedy Records. His sophomore album, The Blackest Panther, came out in February 2020. In the summer of 2020, he wrote and performed on the CBC series Humour Resources.

Arthur Simeon is part of the Toronto-based label Comedy Records and was featured on their ten-year anniversary album.
