= Maynard Morrison =

Canadian actor and director

Maynard Morrison, a Canadian comedian, actor, director, and teacher from Sydney, Nova Scotia, has performed on TV, radio and in live venues across Canada. He was also a teacher of performing arts at Sydney Academy in Sydney, Nova Scotia, retiring in 2015. His teaching career spans over 30 years of developmental drama / performing arts instruction at various schools.

== Personal life ==
Morrison is married to actress and comedian Bette MacDonald.

== Projects ==
Morrison was a founding member of the long running Cape Breton Summertime Revue stage show where he created and portrayed many popular characters who exhibited a distinct Cape Breton flair.

He has collaborated with his wife Bette on many productions including New Waterford Girl, "IT" Came From Away, and the TV show Liocracy.

Maynard has also been director and a key contributor to the movies released every year by the Sydney Academy Drama Group, the group in which he oversees at the high school where he teaches drama. Just recently he had a cameo role as a judge at "Kangaroo Court" during the courtroom scene of "Its About Vincent".
