= New Waterford Girl =

1999 film by Allan Moyle

- Theatrical release poster
- Directed by: Allan Moyle
- Written by: Tricia Fish
- Produced by: Jennifer Kawaja; Julia Sereny
- Starring: Nicholas Campbell; Mary Walsh; Tara Spencer-Nairn; Liane Balaban; Mark McKinney; Andrew McCarthy; Cathy Moriarty
- Cinematography: Derek Rogers
- Edited by: Susan Maggi
- Music by: Geoff Bennett; Longo Hai; Ben Johannesen
- Production companies: Sienna Films; Imagex
- Distributed by: Odeon Films
- Release dates: September 12, 1999 (TIFF); May 30, 2000 (Canada)
- Running time: 97 minutes
- Country: Canada
- Language: English
- Box office: $774,469

New Waterford Girl is a 1999 Canadian comedy-drama film directed by Allan Moyle, and written by Tricia Fish. It stars Liane Balaban as Agnes-Marie "Mooney" Pottie, a teenager in New Waterford, Nova Scotia, who dreams of life beyond her small-town home. She is inspired and fascinated when Lou Benzoa (Tara Spencer-Nairn), an idiosyncratic girl from New York City, moves into the house next door. Agnes learns Lou has a talent for boxing, leading to her taking Lou in as "muscle" in an attempt to make some changes around town.

The film's cast also includes Mary Walsh, John Dunsworth, Maynard Morrison, Nicholas Campbell, Cathy Moriarty, Andrew McCarthy, Mark McKinney, Bette MacDonald, Ashley MacIsaac, Krista MacDonald, Cassie MacDonald, Darren Keay, Patrick Joyce, Marguerite McNeil and Jeff Ryan.

== Plot ==
Agnes-Marie "Mooney" Pottie is a 15-year-old girl and black sheep of her family who is sick of her life in the isolated coastal community of New Waterford. She is considered an exceptional student by her depressive, semi-alcoholic English teacher, Cecil Sweeney, who also nurtures an inappropriate crush towards Mooney that is not reciprocated. Based on her talent, Cecil suggests she should attend an arts school in New York City. Mooney manages to get a scholarship at one school, but her religious parents, Francis and Cookie, refuse to let her go.

When a family from New York City moves in next door, Mooney quickly becomes friends with the eldest daughter, Lou. Lou is the daughter of a jailed boxer, and though she is of modest stature, she is able to knock men out when they are lying, something the devoutly Catholic townspeople consider as something of a religious miracle. Lou develops a side hustle, knocking out the unfaithful men of the town in exchange for money from their wronged girlfriends. Meanwhile, Mooney concocts a plan to leave town. She begins to openly kiss different boys in town in order to gain a reputation for promiscuity, though she never actually has sex with any of them.

Not wanting to be left out, many boys claim they have slept with Mooney. Mooney then tells her parents she is pregnant, which she knows will cause them to send her away where she can then escape and run away to Manhattan. However, the plan backfires as the boys of the town, having wised up to Mooney’s plan, threaten to reveal the truth about never having slept with Mooney. Though Mooney orders Lou to punch them out to show they are liars, they do not fall down when she hits them which shows they are telling the truth. Joey, one of the boys, gives the girls an ultimatum—Lou must face off with New Waterford’s reigning boxing champion in a match, or Mooney’s secret will be made public.

Lou ends up winning the match, but Mooney sees Joey outing her to her father anyway. Her father now believes she lied about being promiscuous primarily to cover up the fact that the father of her baby is Cecil. Francis goes to confront Cecil at his trailer, which sits on the edge of a cliff. Cecil, grasping what is going on, claims he is the father and kisses Mooney. Mooney's mother, arriving in time to see the kiss, gets in her car and rams it several times into Cecil's trailer, causing it to topple over the cliff and land on the beach below.

Later, Mooney boards a train to Antigonish, Nova Scotia, where she is to spend the rest of her supposed pregnancy. After exchanging goodbyes with her family, Mooney is given a letter by her mother just before leaving. Seeing her tearful family, she announces she wants to stay. Her mother orders her to get back on the train. On the train, Mooney reads the letter which reveals that her mother knows what her plans are and wishes her luck.

== Cast ==
- Liane Balaban as Agnes-Marie "Mooney" Pottie
- Andrew McCarthy as Cecil Sweeney
- Nicholas Campbell as Francis Pottie
- Tara Spencer-Nairn as Lou Benzoa
- Mary Walsh as "Cookie" Pottie
- John Dunsworth as Roddy
- Cathy Moriarty as Midge Benzoa
- Mark McKinney as Dr. Hogan
- Darren Keay as Lexter Pottie
- Kevin Curran as Joey
- Krista MacDonald as Betty-Anne Pottie
- Cassie MacDonald as Darlene Pottie
- Adrien Dixon as Felix Pottie
- Patrick Joyce as Darcy Benzoa
- Maynard Morrison as Fry Cook #1
- Bette MacDonald as Fry Cook #2
- Ashley MacIsaac as Town Fiddler
- Marguerite McNeil as Elderly Woman

== Production ==
At the time of production, lead actress Liane Balaban was not an actress. She met producer Julia Sereny at a relative's Seder and was invited to audition for the role.

"Only Way", a song by singer-songwriter Blaise Pascal, is featured at the end of the film.

== Reception ==
New Waterford Girl has a rating of 92% based on 12 reviews on Rotten Tomatoes. A. O. Scott of The New York Times wrote the film "is not exactly a new story, but the filmmakers' sense of local color, their springy, disjointed narrative style and a general refusal on their part or the actors' to stoop to caricature give this version a freshness and intensity that recall the television series My So-Called Life of blessed memory."

Writing for The Village Voice, Amy Taubin said the film is "a tender and hilarious vision of female adolescence," and praised Allen Moyle's direction, commenting "New Waterford may be a one-street town, but the Nova Scotia coast has a rough, romantic beauty, and the closer Mooney comes to getting out, the more she feels the pull of the place. Moyle shows us Nova Scotia through Mooney’s eyes—a gray sky softly edged with pink at sunset, a brilliantly blue wooden house."

In 2001, an industry poll conducted by Playback named it the seventh best Canadian film of the preceding 15 years.

The film was screened at the inaugural edition of the Nova Scotia Retro Film Festo in January 2025.
