= Rideau Hall (TV series) =

- Genre: Comedy
- Country of origin: Canada
- No. of episodes: 6 (+ 1 hour pilot)

Production
- Running time: 30 minutes

Original release
- Network: CBC Television
- Release: October 11, 2002 – November 2002

Rideau Hall is a Canadian comedy television series broadcast in 2002 on CBC Television.

The show starred Bette MacDonald as Regina Gallant, an earthy, one-hit wonder disco queen who is recommended for appointment as Governor General by a conniving Prime Minister who anticipates that she will become a national embarrassment in the job, allowing him to move ahead in eliminating the position, along with the Canadian monarchy. Regina is brash and loud and highly unsuitable for a formal position, but has a charming common touch.

Each episode has her becoming embroiled in one scandal or another, usually not of her making, only to have things resolve in her favour by the end. Fiona Reid plays her prim and proper executive assistant Eleanor Sharpe, Jonathan Torrens plays her flakey gay press secretary Daniel Van Dusen, and Joe Dinicol plays her laconic, level-headed son Jason. Rejean Cournoyer plays the Prime Minister's aide who is the primary liaison between Rideau Hall and the Prime Minister's office; Barry Flatman played the prime minister in the pilot, but did not appear in the regular series.

Six half-hour episodes plus an hour-long pilot were produced. The show was not renewed for a second season.
