= Bette MacDonald =

Canadian comedian, actress, and writer

- Medium: Stand-up, television, film
- Years active: 1984–present
- Genres: Sketch comedy, satire
- Spouse: Maynard Morrison
- Website: www.bettemacdonald.com

Bette MacDonald is a Canadian comedian, actress, and writer, best known for her comedic television series Rideau Hall.

A premier Atlantic Canadian comedian, she has been compared to Carol Burnett, John Candy and Bette Midler; described as a comic genius with impeccable timing, or as the Halifax Herald described: "To watch her is to be a deer caught in the headlights of comedic talent".

She is a winner of the Gemini Award.

MacDonald is married to fellow Maritime comedic writer and performer Maynard Morrison.

== Credits ==
- 1984 – The Bay Boy – Nurse (as Betty MacDonald)
- 1999 – New Waterford Girl – Fry Cook #2
- 1999 – The Bette Show (TV series)
- 2001 – Lexx (TV series)
- 2001 – Liocracy (TV series)
- 1998–2001 – Made in Canada (TV series)
- 2002 – Rideau Hall – Regina Gallant
- 2003–2004 – Halifax Comedy Festival (TV mini-series)
- 2004 –Winnipeg Comedy Festival (TV series)
- 2012–2018 – Mr. D – Trudy Walsh
