= Stand Up For Mental Health =

Stand Up For Mental Health (SMH), founded in 2004, is a program based in Vancouver, British Columbia, Canada, in which people who have mental illness (e.g. bipolar disorder, depression, schizophrenia, obsessive compulsive disorder, or post-traumatic stress disorder) are taught stand-up comedy as a form of therapy and then present to the community as a way of addressing the stigma, discrimination, and prejudice surrounding mental health problems. SMH does not consider itself a replacement for medication or conventional therapy, but instead a supplemental way for people with mental illness to heal while educating others. The classes are taught by counselor, stand-up comic and author of The Happy Neurotic: How Fear and Angst Can Lead to Happiness and Success, David Granirer who lives with depression. SMH has classes in Halifax, Montreal, Ottawa, Toronto, Guelph, Fort Frances, London (ON), Vancouver, Abbotsford/Chilliwack, Victoria and Courtenay. Famed Canadian comedian Mike MacDonald is a supporter of SMH and performs at many of their shows. Mike MacDonald has bipolar disorder.

== Background ==
David Granirer teaches community members who have a mental illness how to create and perform original comedy material about their mental health journeys. They perform shows throughout the course of their 20 classes, then may continue on with SMH in the Alumni Program. SMH classes are aimed at mental health consumers to re-conceptualize their experiences and make light of their own problems, while building self-esteem and a support network. The participants are instructed to avoid joking about each other's problems, but to continue to openly talk about them. They also avoid making jokes about sexual abuse. SMH additionally does Fighting Stigma in the Workplace and Laughter in the Workplace presentations and workshops for many different companies and government agencies. They perform across North America at conferences, on military bases, university and college campuses, at mental health facilities, comedy festivals, and for the general public. A CBC Television Passionate Eye Documentary was made about Stand Up for Mental Health, entitled "Cracking Up," which won a US Government VOICE Award in 2008.

SMH has future visions of to introducing a pre-release program into William Head Institution on Vancouver Island for Corrections Canada, aiming to help offenders rebuild self-esteem and gain life-coping skills as they reintegrate into the community. Early in 2010, SMH received a $50,000 sponsorship from Canada Post who called it a "highlysuccessful laughter-therapy program".

The organisation is a registered society in the province of British Columbia.
