= Blaise Pascal (musician) =

Canadian singer-songwriter

Blaise Pascal is a Canadian singer-songwriter who was active in the early 2000s. Although she released only one album, 2000's Hairspray, she was a Juno Award nominee for Songwriter of the Year at the Juno Awards of 2001 for her songs "Angel Baby", "10 Feet High" and "Crush".

== Background ==
Born in Montreal as the daughter of former Atkinson Foundation director Charles Pascal and television producer Karen Pascal, she moved to Markham, Ontario, in childhood.

She trained as a ballet dancer in her teens, turning to songwriting as a new outlet after sustaining neck and knee injuries in a car accident. She also had a number of acting roles in television films in this era.

== Musical career ==
After only a few months of writing music, she won Standard Broadcasting's National Songwriting Competition in 1996 for her song "Kings & Queens", and subsequently took second place in the pop category of the international John Lennon Songwriting Competition for "By the Side of the Road". Using her insurance settlement from the car accident, she funded her first musical demos in 1996.

In 1999 she placed her song "Only Way" in the soundtrack to the film New Waterford Girl. She released Hairspray on Page Music in 2000, garnering radio airplay for the single "10 Feet High". She also performed the theme song for the Family Channel/Disney Channel drama series In a Heartbeat.

In 2000 she performed at a benefit concert for families affected by the Walkerton E. coli outbreak, alongside artists such as See Spot Run, Clarknova, Serial Joe, The Wilkinsons, The Mercey Brothers, Jim Witter, Jason McCoy, Paul Brandt and Alan Frew. In 2001 she appeared on Amy Sky's Phenomenal Woman concert series, and toured as an opening act for Lily Frost.
