= Ron Vaudry =

Canadian comedian

Ron Vaudry is a Canadian comedian who has also worked extensively in the United Kingdom. He also appeared in The Late Show with Arsenio Hall.
