= David Andrew Brent =

Canadian comedian

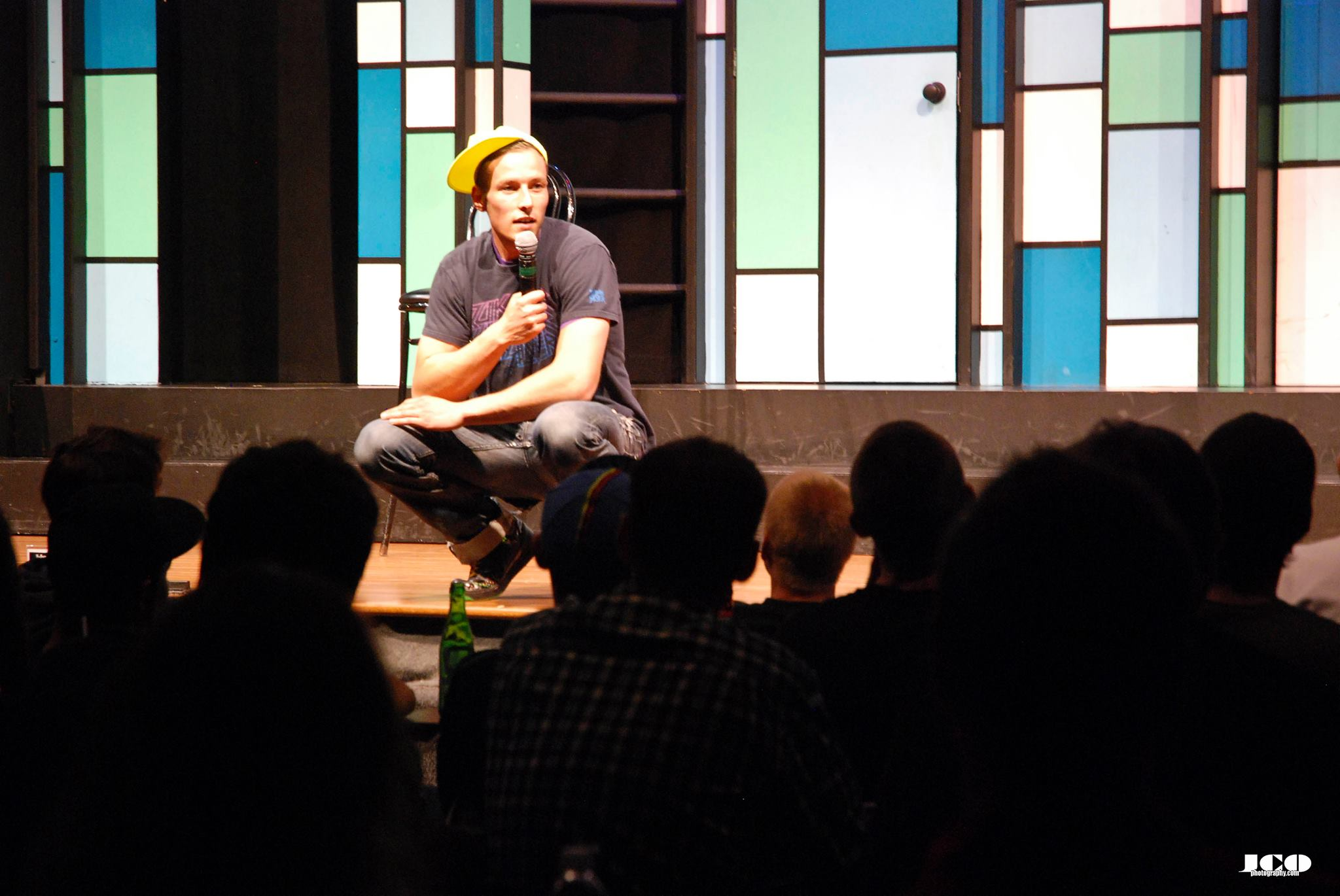
- David Andrew Brent at the Second City
- Born: May 28, 1981 (age 45); Thornhill, Ontario
- Occupations: Comedian, actor

David Andrew Brent (born May 28, 1981) is a Canadian-born comedian, actor, voice actor and producer.

== Early life ==
Brent was born in Thornhill, Ontario, Canada. His father is a retired police officer and his mother is a retired manager of a textile company. His elder brother is an academic. He graduated from Thornlea Secondary School in 1999.

== Career ==
Brent's worked in the entertainment industry as a Battle and Rave DJ, where he performed as The Dirt Bike Kid from 1999 until 2009. Based out of Toronto and Vancouver, he began working as a comic in 2000. He presented regular shows at The Second City, Absolute Comedy, Comedy Bar and The LOT Comedy Club. In 2010 he created a comedy show called NBA Comics, in which he performed a group of Canadian comics.

In October 2013, Brent performed at the Brantford Comedy Festival. Muscle and Fitness magazine and the Huffington Post printed very positive reviews of Brent's impression of Arnold Schwarzenegger which is part of the routine he performs in comedy clubs. Brent's work was acknowledged by Schwarzenegger via Twitter, after which Brent was featured in a number of news stories. Brent was also interviewed about his comedy routine on Breakfast Television Vancouver.

Brent is also a winner of the Brantford Comedy Festival's Rising Star Challenge in 2013.

In 2014, he toured Canada with his one-man show "Ricky Gervais".
