= Canadian Freelance Union =

Chapter of the trade union Unifor

- Le Syndicat canadien des pigistes
- Abbreviation: CFU
- Established: 2008; 18 years ago
- Type: Trade union
- Headquarters: 196 Rene-Levesque; Quebec, G1R2A5; Quebec, Canada
- Location: Canada
- Coordinates: 46.8066175°N 71.2259948°W
- Origins: CEP
- Field: Freelancing
- Official language: French and English
- President: Nora Loreto
- Vice President: Ana Rugamas
- Treasurer: Steven Watt
- Key people: Paula Kirman & Vannina Sztainbok
- Parent organization: Unifor
- Website: canadianfreelanceunion.ca

The Canadian Freelance Union (CFU) is a Canadian trade union. It was created in 2008 by the Communications, Energy and Paperworkers Union of Canada (CEP), a local that did not have a collective agreement with a single employer.

== History ==
When CEP merged with the Canadian Auto Workers in 2012–2013 to create Unifor, the CFU became one of Unifor's first "community chapters" (a union local for members not in a single location sharing common interests and common work types).

== Organization ==
The CFU has a strong focus on freelance media contributors, such as writers and designers, but in 2015 broadened its scope to seek to affiliate freelancers in many fields and among vulnerable workers in Canada engaged in precarious work.

The union identifies three key areas of focus:

1. To take action for better standards for freelancers.
2. To provide medical plans, arbitration insurance, and other services individuals cannot access on their own.
3. To combat social isolation by helping members connect with other freelancers.
