= Derek Seguin =

Canadian stand-up comedian (born 1972)

Derek Seguin is a Canadian stand-up comedian. Of mixed French Canadian and Irish descent, he is best known for comedy which plays on the cultural differences between English Canada and French Canada, which he performs in an intentionally exaggerated stereotype of a Québécois accent.

== Comedy career ==
He is a regular performer at comedy festivals across Canada, including Just for Laughs and the Winnipeg Comedy Festival, appears regularly on the CBC Radio comedy series The Debaters, and appeared with Sebastien Bourgault in the comedy web series Language Police in 2013.

In 2008, he collaborated with Mike Ward and Maxim Martin on "French Comedy Bastards", a touring show which brought Quebec-style comedy — a style which blends stand-up and sketch elements more freely than is typical in English Canada — to anglophone audiences.

== Awards ==
In October 2015, Seguin won the 6th annual Canadian Top Comic competition, presented by SiriusXM Canada in association with the Just For Laughs festival.

His comedy album PanDerek (1st Wave!) received a Juno Award nomination for Comedy Album of the Year at the Juno Awards of 2021. He received a second Juno nomination in the same category at the Juno Awards of 2024 for Life of Leisure.
