= Steven Shehori =

Canadian writer and director

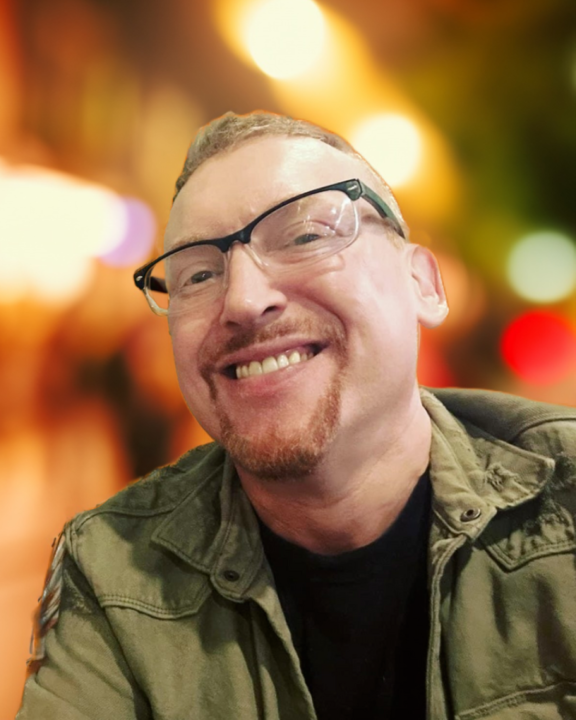
- Steven Shehori in 2024
- Born: October 28, 1971 (age 54); Winnipeg, Manitoba, Canada
- Occupations: TV writer, director, columnist
- Writing career
- Genres: Television pop culture Theatre

Steven Shehori (born October 28, 1971) is a Canadian writer, director, journalist, playwright, actor, author, and comedian from Toronto, Ontario. He contributes to Vulture and The Onion's The A.V. Club, and worked as a writer, editor, and celebrity interviewer for The Huffington Post from 2008 to 2018, contributing humor, film, music, political, and journalism pieces. In 2010, his satirical musical comedy Stephen Harper The Musical became the first-ever play to be staged at the international comedy festival Just For Laughs. In 2011, he broke the front-page Huffington Post story of the Toronto Catholic School Board dropping a lesbian comedian from its homophobia awareness event after discovering she was gay married. That same year, Shehori made headlines for securing the first post-series finale interview from Lost creator Damon Lindelof, where instead of discussing the show, the two men wrote out a beat-by-beat alternate version of Sex and the City 2.

Since 2007, Shehori has written for 10 national awards shows, including the Genie Awards, The Gemini Awards, The ACTRA Awards, and the Writers Guild of Canada Awards. In 2009, he served as a producer and writer on two Massey Hall Just For Laughs galas, including Sarah Silverman & Friends, which starred comedians Sarah Silverman, David Cross, Louis C.K., and John Mulaney. In 2010, Shehori wrote for five national programs: Baxter, Out There with Melissa DiMarco, Definitely Not the Opera, This Hour Has 22 Minutes, and The Hour (a.k.a. George Stroumboulopoulos Tonight), where he wrote and starred in sketches with numerous guests, including Snoop Dogg, David Cross, and Richard Dawkins. Additionally, he assisted with the development of the acclaimed CW comedy series Backpackers, and wrote and directed the comedic short film The Hills After Show Spinoffs starring Schitt's Creek creator Dan Levy.

From 2001 to 2013 Shehori wrote, directed, and segment produced for Naked News and its sister program Naked News TV. He subsequently starred in the 2013 SuperChannel documentary series Naked News Uncovered. From 2012 to 2015, he served as a contributing writer to Entertainment Tonight. In 2015, he contributed to the pop culture book The Take2 Guide to Lost.

From 2014 to 2018, Shehori co-hosted 140 episodes of the comedy podcast You Better DON'T! In January 2018, he hosted an episode of Wishlist on SiriusXM's Pearl Jam Radio. Later that year, he was invited to perform several stand-up comedy sets at the 2018 Burbank Comedy Festival. In 2019, he served as a senior comedy writer and cartoonist for Macaulay Culkin's satire site Bunny Ears, and hosted the Dash Radio shows With the Beatles and Classic Rock, Classic Comedy.

Shehori has made appearances as an actor and pop culture commentator on several national Canadian television programs, including The Comedy Network's Punched Up, MuchMusic's Video on Trial and Stars Gone Wild, and MuchMoreMusic's Listed. As a voice actor, he has recorded several dozen TV and film commercials, and played the lead role of 'Fighter' in 125 episodes of North America's adaptation of the anime TV series Let's & Go.

Shehori has produced over 100 live comedy shows with his brother Daniel under the name The Shehori Brothers. These include The Shehori Brothers' Character Night (deemed the longest-running production in the history of The Second City Toronto), and An Awkward Evening With Martin & Johnson, which featured the creators of the Tony Award-winning Broadway musical The Drowsy Chaperone. The Shehori Brothers have written, directed, and produced five full-length theater productions to date: Mikayla (2000), Radcliffe & Minotauk Falls (2002), Swiss Family Guy Robinson (with Brian Froud & Mark Chavez—2006), One-Woman Show (with Marco Timpano—2008), and Stephen Harper the Musical (2010), with each one nominated for national awards. In 2017, they co-wrote the book Media Whore, published by Self-Counsel Press.
