= Dave Weasel =

American screenwriter

- Born: September 22, 1984 (age 42); Fort McMurray, Alberta, Canada

Comedy career
- Medium: Stand-up comedy, News satire
- Genres: Observational comedy; Political/News satire; Satire; Deadpan
- Subjects: Current events; American politics; American culture; Dating; Religion

Dave Wezl (born September 22, 1984), better known by his stage name Dave Weasel is a Canadian-American stand-up comedian and writer known for his debut album I'm 30, which peaked at #1 on the Billboard Comedy Charts for 5 straight weeks, and his news satire writing in The Valley Report website.

== Discography ==
Year	Album	Peak chart positions			
Year	Album	US Comedy	iTunes Comedy	US Heat	US Indie
2018	I'm 30: Released: February 16, 2018	1	1	14	40
