= Jess Salomon =

Canadian comedian,lawyer (born 20th century)

Jess Salomon (born 20th century) is a Canadian stand-up comedian from Montreal, Quebec.

She is noted for her 2024 comedy album Sad Witch, which was a nominee for the Juno Award for Comedy Album of the Year at the Juno Awards of 2025.

Prior to launching her stand-up comedy career, Salomon was a war-crimes lawyer at the International Court of Justice in The Hague.

Her press coverage has often focused on her unusual situation as a Jewish woman who is in a lesbian relationship with a Palestinian Muslim Eman El-Husseini, who is also a comedian. They met in Montreal in 2009, and a few years later they began working as a duo and moved to New York.

In 2020, Salomon and El-Husseini launched the BBC World Service podcast Comedians vs. The News.
