= Comedy Records =

Canadian record label

- Founded: July 10, 2010
- Founder: Barry Taylor, Tim Golden
- Genre: Comedy
- Country of origin: Canada, U.S.
- Location: Toronto, Miami
- Official website: www.comedyrecords.ca

Comedy Records is an independent record label run by Toronto-based comedians Tim Golden and Barry Taylor. The label only releases stand up and sketch comedy albums. Comedy Records currently has offices in Toronto and Miami.

== History ==
Comedy Records began on July 10, 2010 in Toronto, Canada and was founded by former CFNY-FM personality, Barry Taylor. After being let go from his on-air position in 2009, Taylor began to pursue a career in stand up comedy. One of his early projects was recording a compilation album with ten other up and coming Toronto-based comedians. While looking for distribution, Taylor discovered there were very few labels in Canada releasing comedy albums and the idea for Comedy Records was born. Friend and industry colleague, Joel Carriere agreed to distribute Comedy Records through his label, Dine Alone Records.

The goal when Comedy Records began was to take the indie music label template and apply it to comedy. Using the label itself as a brand to work on an album and then build shows and tours around it. Since its inception Comedy Records has released over one hundred stand up and sketch comedy albums.

In November 2014 Taylor partnered with one of the original Comedy Records comedians, Tim Golden to expand the label to the United States. The company's first American release was with Miami-born comedian Forrest Shaw. The label has since gone on to produce albums at clubs and theaters in Miami, New York and Boston.

The label currently manages a select group of comedians and celebrated their ten year anniversary by pressing a vinyl compilation album featuring their roster that can otherwise only be heard on SiriusXM.

== Artists ==
- Mark DeBonis
- Adrienne Fish
- Courtney Gilmour
- Bria Hiebert
- Garrett Jamieson
- Alonzo Hamburger Jones
- Jay Wells L'Ecuyer
- Emmanuel Lomuro
- Brittany Lyseng
- Justin Shaw
- Eytan Millstone
- Chad Anderson
- Nick Reynoldson
- Dena Jackson
- Todd Graham
- Monty Scott
- Clare Belford
- Forrest Shaw
- Efthimios Nasiopoulos
- K. Trevor Wilson
