= Nestor Pistor =

Canadian comedian

Nestor Pistor is the stage name of Don Ast, a Canadian comedian of Romanian heritage who performs in the character of a heavily accented Ukrainian immigrant. He has been a three-time Juno Award nominee for Comedy Album of the Year, receiving two nominations at the Juno Awards of 1979 for his albums Nestor Pistor for Prime Minister and Best of Nestor Pistor and one nomination at the Juno Awards of 1980 for the self-titled Nestor Pistor, and a nominee for Most Promising Male Vocalist at the Juno Awards of 1977.

Pistor began performing in the 1970s on the comedy circuit in Western Canada, and released two albums, Live (1974) and Here We Go Again (1975) before breaking through to national attention in 1976 with his third album Winestoned Plowboy. Backed by the country music group Prairie Fire, the album deviated from Ast's usual stand-up comedy act and instead featured him singing country songs in character as Pistor. Its title track, a parody of Glen Campbell's "Rhinestone Cowboy", was a charting hit in RPM's country music charts, peaking at #16 in the week of February 12, 1977. The album was certified gold by February 1977, and resulted in Pistor's Juno nomination for Most Promising Male Vocalist; by March 1977, both of his earlier albums were also charting in the RPM 100 Albums chart. He released several further albums by 1980, receiving his three Juno Award nominations for Comedy Album of the Year in 1979 and 1980.

He faded in prominence in the 1980s, but still performs occasional shows. In 2019, he celebrated 50 years of performing, with shows in British Columbia and Alberta.

== Discography ==
- Nestor Pistor Live At World Championship Snowgolf, Prince George BC (1974) (#78)
- Here We Go Again - Nestor Pistor #2 (1975) (#84)
- Winestoned Plowboy (1977)
- Nestor Pistor for Prime Minister (1978)
- Almost Alive (1978)
- It's a Heartburn (1980)
- Beer Commercials Drive Me...Nuts [On Radio & TV] (1980)
- Plugged In (1997)
