= David Granirer =

Canadian public speaker

Comedy career
- Medium: Stand-up
- Genres: Satire, Observational comedy

David Granirer is a Canadian counsellor, stand-up comic, public speaker and the author of The Happy Neurotic: How Fear and Angst can Lead to Happiness and Success. He is the founder of Stand Up For Mental Health.

Granirer advocates for the de-stigmatization of mental illness and speaks openly about his experience with depression. He also teaches stand-up comedy to people with mental illness at Langara College in Vancouver. He is a public speaker who presents Fighting Stigma in the Workplace and Laughter in the Workplace.

His father and grandparents were Romanian Jews who survived concentration camps.
