= Harry Doupe =

Harry Doupe is a Canadian stand-up comedian, producer, and writer from Fort Langley, British Columbia. He has performed shows at clubs, theatres, and arenas across North America. He was the first comedian to perform three times at Toronto's Air Canada Centre, MC-ing shows for The Tragically Hip on their New Year's Eve 1999 and New Year's Day 2000 shows, as well as opening for "Weird Al" Yankovic on his "Running With Scissors" Tour.

He began his stand-up career on December 7, 1982 at Punchlines Comedy Theatre in Vancouver, choosing the date carefully. "I figured no matter how badly I bombed, historically it would be greatly overshadowed". Over the years he would perform alongside the likes of Jim Carrey, Sam Kinison, Louis CK, Jerry Seinfeld, Margaret Cho, Howie Mandel, Paula Poundstone, Norm Macdonald, Maria Bamford, Rick Mercer, Samantha Bee, Lewis Black, Janeane Garofalo, Todd Barry, and others.

He began headlining shows for Punchlines in 1984 and moved to headlining shows for Yuk Yuk's in 1986. He moved base from Vancouver to Toronto in 1987, as he headlined their clubs across the country, and upon reception of his American Green Card, relocated to the comedy hotbed of San Francisco in 1989. He would perform along with the Bay Area's top comics, as well as the emerging talents of Marc Maron, Brian Posehn. Margaret Cho, Patton Oswalt, Greg Behrendt and others.

After three years, wishing to work behind the scenes in television and production he returned to Toronto in late 1992. He became a regular headliner at The Laugh Resort Comedy Club, as well as a performer and writer on various television projects. Among those would be appearances on Comics!, Comedy On The Road, the Winnipeg Comedy Festival as well as writing for 6 Juno Awards, 6 Gemini Awards, 3 NHL Awards, and 3 Genie Awards. He won a Canadian Comedy Award for Best Television Writing in 2004 for The Toronto Show.

In 2005 he helped create and develop Kraft Hockeyville and was a producer for the first year's television series. He has also performed the State of the Industry Address annually at the Canadian Comedy Awards, beginning in 2004 in London, Ontario through 2011, while he later took over as the producer of the Canadian Comedy Awards themselves for the years 2009–2011.

Additionally, he has worked as a senior writer of CBC's coverage of the 2008 Beijing, 2014 Sochi, and 2016 Rio Olympic Games. Over the same period he became a regular guest on CBC Radio's The Debaters.

In 2012 he helped found the YYComedy Festival in Calgary, along with Cory Mack and James Sutherland, which he also produced.

After having lived in Vancouver, San Francisco, Toronto, and Calgary, he currently resides in Chilliwack, British Columbia.
