= Sandra Battaglini =

Canadian comedian (born 1971)

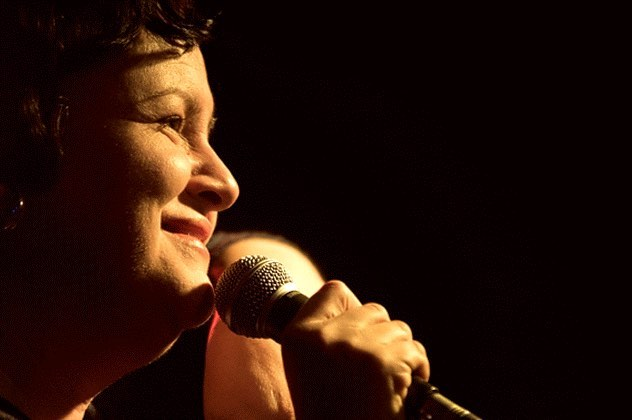
- Born: 8 June 1971 (age 55); Sudbury, Ontario, Canada
- Occupation: Comedian
- Years active: 2001–present
- Known for: Founding the Canadian Association of Stand-up Comedians
- Notable work: Hard Headed Woman; Classy Lady

Sandra Battaglini (born 1971) is a Canadian stand-up comedian, actor, labour organizer, and historian. She won Canadian Comedy Awards for her one-person shows Classy Lady and Hard Headed Woman, and was nominated for Comedic Artist of the Year in 2019. She founded the Canadian Association of Stand-up Comedians (CASC) in 2017 and organized a petition to have stand-up comedy recognized by the Canadian government as an art form.

== Early life and education ==
Battaglini was born on 8 June 1971 in Sudbury, Ontario, where she grew up. She attended Marymount College.

Battaglini completed a master's degree in history at Laurentian University in Sudbury in 1996. Her research focused on women who had worked at the city's nickel mines during the second world war. She presented her paper "Don't Go Down the Mine Mamma! – Women in Production Jobs at Inco During WWII" at a 1999 Ontario Women's History Network conference.

== Career ==
Battaglini moved to Toronto where she completed a postgraduate marketing course at Humber College. She found employment doing market research for a Toronto firm until late 1999.

In January 2000, after spending New Year's in Sudbury, Battaglini was returning to Toronto with a friend. Their car was struck by an oncoming vehicle on Highway 69 and careened into a snowbank. Shortly after they crawled out of the car, it exploded. Battaglini later stated that throughout the ordeal, her main thought was whether she would be able to attend her improv comedy class at Toronto's Second City. This convinced her to pursue a career in comedy.

Battaglini had an interest in opera and had done a little theatre with the Italian comedy troupe at Laurentian. She then did a year with Second City. She has performed improvisational comedy, sketch comedy, stand-up, clowning, vaudeville, and performance art. Battaglini draws upon her Italian-Canadian heritage in her comedy, with a tough and rugged element from her upbringing in Northern Ontario, and frequently examines the absurdity of daily life.

She worked for the Yuk Yuk's chain for a few years, then left due to their non-compete clause which she felt was unfair as they were "not paying full-time wages". Battaglini has also described a "circle of entrapment" faced by Canadian comedians due to limited domestic opportunities which forces them to leave the country in order to advance their careers.

Battaglini's first one-person show, A Small Battalion of Soldiers (2003) received a 'masterpiece' rating from Now and was nominated for a Canadian Comedy Award. She won CCAs for her later one person shows Hard Headed Woman and Classy Lady. With longtime collaborators Phil Luzi, Precious Chong and Christopher Sawchyn, Battaglini formed the troupe The Specials. In a review for Fab, Paul Bellini praised the character comedy in the troupe's original musical 9/11/11 as some of the best he'd seen since The Kids in the Hall.

Battaglini is the subject of the 2021 documentary film The Mayor of Comedy: A Canadian Stand-Up Story.

== Advocacy ==
In 2016, Battaglini wrote "Just a little Reciprocity", an open letter to the prime minister, in which she described the struggles of comics, their lack of public funding, and the disparity with their American counterparts when attempting to work in each other's country. It gained some attention in the comedy community and Battaglini launched an online petition requesting that the federal government consider stand-up comedy to be an art form. The petition gained 2000 signatures in a week, and had nearly 4000 signatures when presented to the House of Commons by MP Julie Dabrusin on 24 September 2018.

In 2017, Battaglini, Johanne Britton, and a few other comics founded the Canadian Association of Stand-up Comedians (CASC). By 2018, CASC had 600 members. CASC had two main goals: to gain Canada Arts Council recognition of stand-up comedy as an art form, and to remove unfair barriers for Canadian stand-ups to perform in the United States.

== Notable works ==
=== One person shows ===
- A Small Battalion of Soldiers (2005)
- Hard Headed Woman
- Classy Lady (2012)
- Baby Jeez and other Abreevs

=== Stage ===
- The Chlamydia Trilogies (2001) with Tracey Nolan
- The Vagina Monologues
- Tony n' Tina's Wedding
- Mambo Italiano (2007)
- Hanging with Jesus (2007)
- 9/11/11 (2011 musical)
- In Piazza San Domenico (2015)
- Moose on the Loose (2017)

=== Film ===
- Chinatown (director, short film) with Precious Chong
- Maps to the Stars
- In the Shadow of the Moon

=== Television and web series ===
- The Amazing Gayl Pile
- In the Dark
- The Communist's Daughter (2021)

=== Specials ===
- Take it Ease (2022 comedy special)

== Awards ==
Award	Ceremony	Category	Work	Result	Ref.
Canadian Comedy Awards	2005	Best One Person Show	A Small Battalion of Soldiers	Nominated	
Canadian Comedy Awards	2007	Best One Person Show	Hard Headed Woman	Won	
Canadian Comedy Awards	2013	Best One Person Show	Classy Lady	Won	
Canadian Comedy Awards	2019	Comedic Artist of the Year	work of 2018	Nominated	
