= Ivan Decker =

Canadian comedian

Ivan Welles Decker (born November 8, 1985) is a Canadian comedian. He won the 2018 Juno Award for Comedy Album of the Year for his album I Wanted to Be a Dinosaur.

He has performed stand-up comedy across North America and on the CBC Radio One program The Debaters, the Winnipeg and Halifax Comedy festivals for CBC Television, the Just for Laughs festival in Montreal, and made his international TV debut on Conan.

Ivan Decker also appeared as one of only 4 Canadians in the Netflix series, Comedians of the World which aired on January 1, 2019.

Decker was born in Montreal, Quebec, and grew up in Ladner, British Columbia.

== Discography ==
Albums
| Year | Album | Awards |
|---|---|---|
| 2017 | I Wanted to Be a Dinosaur | 2018 Juno Award for Best Comedy Album |
