= Adam Christie =

Canadian stand-up comedian

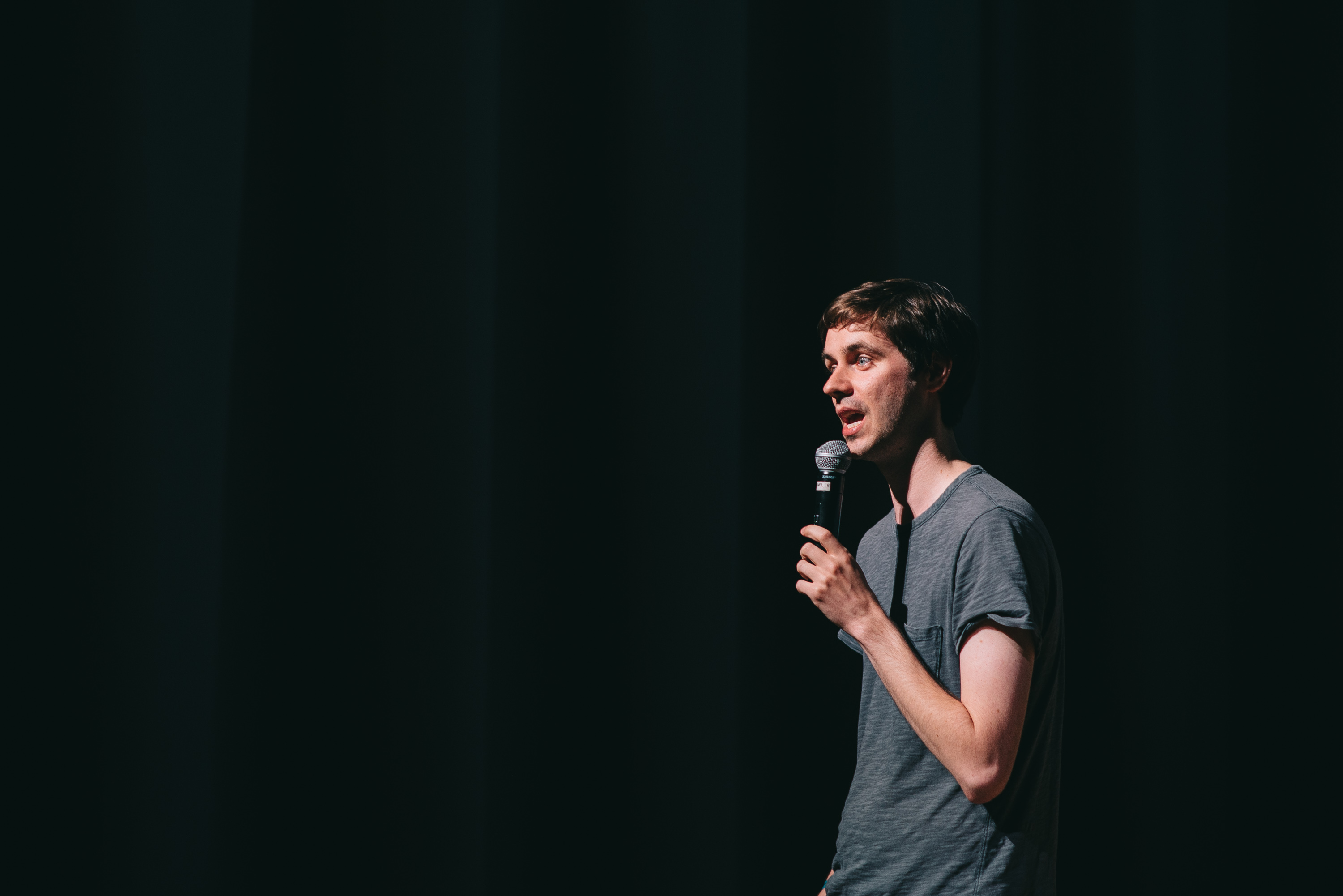
Image of Adam Christie

Adam Christie is a Canadian stand-up comedian. He is most noted for his 2019 comedy album General Anxiety Disorder, which received a Juno Award nomination for Comedy Album of the Year at the Juno Awards of 2020, and his 2025 comedy album Dragonflies, which won the same award at the Juno Awards of 2026.

He was the winner of SiriusXM's Canada's Top Comic competition in 2019, and has been a sketch comedy writer and story editor for This Hour Has 22 Minutes and Baroness von Sketch Show.
