= Cory Mack =

Canadian comedian, emcee, writer and producer

- Occupations: Comedian, emcee, writer, producer
- Years active: 1989–present

Cory Mack is a Canadian comedian, emcee, writer and producer based in Calgary, Alberta.

== Biography ==
Mack is originally from Dodsland, Saskatchewan, where she grew up as a farmer's daughter. She moved to Calgary in the early 1980s and began performing stand-up comedy in 1989.

She had a Comedy Now! television special, has performed at Just for Laughs and other comedy festivals, and was featured on CBC Radio's Madly Off in All Directions, The Go Show!, and The Debaters.

From 2003 to 2006, Mack directed Dirty Laundry, Calgary's long-running improvised soap opera.

In 2005, Mack was nominated for the Canadian Comedy Awards (CCAs) for best female stand-up and for her taped performance Yuk Yuk's Calgary Stampede. In 2011, Mack was recognized with the first Roger Abbott Award for her contributions to the development of the CCAs.

In 2010, Mack produced and starred in her one-person play The Goose Queen of Kindersley. With Donovan Deschner, Mack founded comediapedia.ca in 2010 as a database to promote Canadian comedy performers.

Calgary had been designated Canada's Cultural Capital for 2012, which provided grants allowing Mack to found the annual YYComedy Festival with Harry Doupe and James Sutherland. The inaugural seven-day festival gathered 170 artists performing 43 shows in 17 local venues.

Mack ran as an Alberta Party candidate for the downtown Calgary-Buffalo riding in the 2012 Alberta general election. She lost to the incumbent, having received 2% of the vote.
