= IFHT =

Canadian comedy group

IFHT Films
- Formerly: I F*cking Hate That
- Industry: Film & Entertainment
- Genre: Comedy & Action Sports
- Founded: December 2009
- Founder: Matt Dennison & Jason Lucas
- Headquarters: Vancouver, British Columbia
- Brands: IFHT Films, Mahalo My Dude
- Number of employees: 5
- Website: https://www.ifhtfilms.com/

IFHT Films is a Canadian film production company, founded in 2009 by Matt Dennison and Jason Lucas. The company specialises in comedy and action sport videos and distributes them on their YouTube channel with over 750,000 subscribers.

== History ==
IFHT Films was founded by Richmond based Matt Dennison and Jason Lucas. The two met through mountain biking at a young age, and began their filmmaking journey by recording backyard dirt jump clips. In 2009, Matt and Jason filmed comedy skits and uploaded them to their YouTube channel, named "I F*cking Hate That." Local acclaim gradually gained them broader recognition, notably catalyzed by the virality of their 2012 sensation, "If Diablo 3 Were A Girl.” IFHT Films cultivated a distinctive niche in the comedic realm, epitomized by their acclaimed "How To Be" series and comedic music videos. Evolving beyond recreational pursuits, IFHT Films strategically aligned with entities such as CBC Comedy and Trek Bicycles. While their thematic repertoire expanded, cycling remained a recurrent motif, underscored by their hit piece, "How To Buy a Mountain Bike," which amassed over 16 million views to date.

== Mahalo My Dude ==
Mahalo My Dude is a mountain biking YouTube channel and merchandise store founded by IFHT Films co-founder, Matt Dennison. In 2016, what started as the IFHT Film's vlog channel "ifht2" quickly transitioned into one of the first mountain biking channels on YouTube, called "Matt Dennison." Matt made biking videos solo until Jason Lucas joined him in 2017, commencing a YouTube channel name change to "Matt and Jason." The duo embarked on mountain bike journeys, traversing diverse destinations such as Vancouver Island, Quebec, and France. Matt and Jason also drew from their comedy roots as they blended biking with humour in videos such as "$59 Walmart Bike vs $6500 Mountain Bike" and "IT'S CRANK WORX BABY." The channel continued to grow, and in 2019 it was renamed to "Mahalo My Dude" to accommodate expansion of the team.

Mahalo My Dude is also known for its merchandise store that sells stickers, t-shirts, biking accessories and custom mountain bike jerseys.

== Matt Dennison ==
Matt Dennison is a Canadian film director and YouTuber. He is the co-founder of film production company IFHT Films. He is also the founder of mountain biking YouTube channel, Mahalo My Dude. As a film director, Matt is known for directing several projects involving Trek Bicycles, most notably "How To Buy a Mountain Bike" and "Once Daily Bikes by Trek." Matt is also known for directing several music videos for Canadian R&B duo Manila Grey.

== Jason Lucas ==
Jason Lucas is a Canadian filmmaker, mountain biker and co-founder of film production company IFHT Films. From writing, to producing, to acting, Jason has worn many hats at throughout the years. Jason starred in and wrote the viral video "How to Buy a Mountain Bike." Most recently, Jason starred as the host of Pink bike Academy.
