= Kris LaBelle =

Canadian MMA personality, stand-up comedian

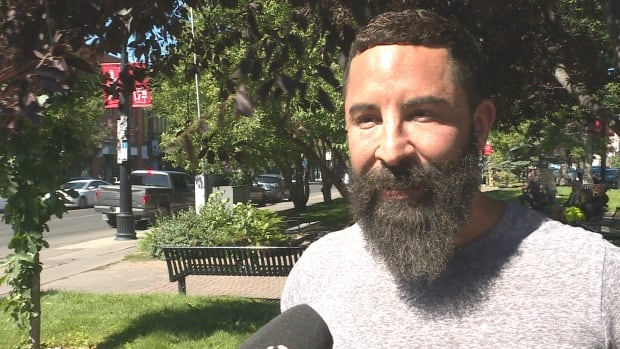
- Born: Kristopher Robert LaBelle; November 30, 1976 (age 49); Thunder Bay, Ontario, Canada

Comedy career
- Years active: 2000—present
- Medium: Stand-up
- Genres: Urban satire, political satire, blue comedy, observational comedy
- Subjects: Recreational drug use, MMA, improvisation, race relations, current events, religion, dominic
- Website: https://krislabelle.com

Kristopher Robert LaBelle (born November 30, 1976) is a Canadian stand-up comedian, comedy producer, actor, color commentator and rapper. He is best known for his color commentary for "King of the Cage Canada". He is also known for his "Kris LaBelle Presents" comedy tour that features Canadian stand-up comedians presented in a gala style themed after Def Comedy Jam.

== Early life ==
LaBelle was born in Thunder Bay, Ontario, Canada.

== Career ==
LaBelle began working for the King of the Cage Canada in 2006 as a promoter. He made his debut interviewing fighters at KOTC "Karnage" in 2006. LaBelle made his television debut on Super Channel as a color commentator for the KOTC event Excalibur in 2008.

LaBelle has toured as a stand-up comedian. In 2010, LaBelle began his own operation and production called the "Fullhouse Comedy Special".
