= Liocracy =

Canadian comedy television series

- Genre: Comedy
- Written by: [various]
- Directed by: Ron Murphy; Alan Resnick
- Starring: Leslie Nielsen
- Country of origin: Canada
- Original language: English
- No. of seasons: 2
- No. of episodes: 26

Production
- Executive producers: Greg Jones, Janice Evans
- Production locations: Halifax, Nova Scotia, Canada
- Running time: 30 minutes

Original release
- Network: The Comedy Network
- Release: 21 April 2001 – 1 February 2003

Liocracy was a Canadian mockumentary comedy television series, which aired on The Comedy Network in 2001 and 2002.

The show, a spoof of biographical documentary series such as Biography or Life and Times, starred Leslie Nielsen as host Terrence Brynne McKennie. Each episode presented a Biography-type profile of a fictional person loosely based on a real-life personality.

The first episode centred on "Fiendly Giant", a Friendly Giant–like children's television host with a penchant for sadomasochism who became a pariah after being caught having sex with his rooster sidekick Rudy. Later episodes focused on Anne Surly, a serial killer indirectly based on Lucy Maud Montgomery and her Anne of Green Gables novels; Simon Duke, a horror novelist who was a spoof of Stephen King; Rachel Lange, a soap opera diva; Boyz 'r Us, a pop music boy band; and the on-again off-again romance of Hollywood acting icons Richard Button and Elizabeth Paladoro.

Filmed in Halifax, Nova Scotia, the show was created by Ian Johnston and Peter Hays, two former journalists for the Halifax Daily News.

The show was titled Liography in its first season, but was changed to Liocracy in the second season after the A&E Network, the producers of the original Biography series, threatened a copyright infringement lawsuit. The second season premiered in November 2002, and ran for 13 episodes into early 2003. The series was not renewed for a third season.
