= Zabrina Douglas =

Canadian stand-up comedian

Zabrina Douglas, also previously known as Zabrina Chevannes, is a Canadian stand-up comedian. Her comedy album Things Black Girls Say: The Album received a Juno Award nomination for Comedy Album of the Year at the Juno Awards of 2023.

Douglas, a registered nurse, performed occasional stand-up comedy sets at Kenny Robinson's Nubian Disciples nights for Black Canadian comedians in the 2000s, and was a nominee for the Tim Sims Award in 2008.

She broke through to wider success in 2020 as the headliner of Laughter from the Frontlines, a virtual comedy show organized by Daniel Woodrow's Unknown Comedy Club featuring frontline health care workers performing comedy and storytelling about coping with the COVID-19 pandemic. She subsequently organized Things Black Girls Say, a regular show at Toronto's Comedy Bar, and recorded her sets at the April 15 and 16, 2022, shows for release as an album.
