= KRNFX =

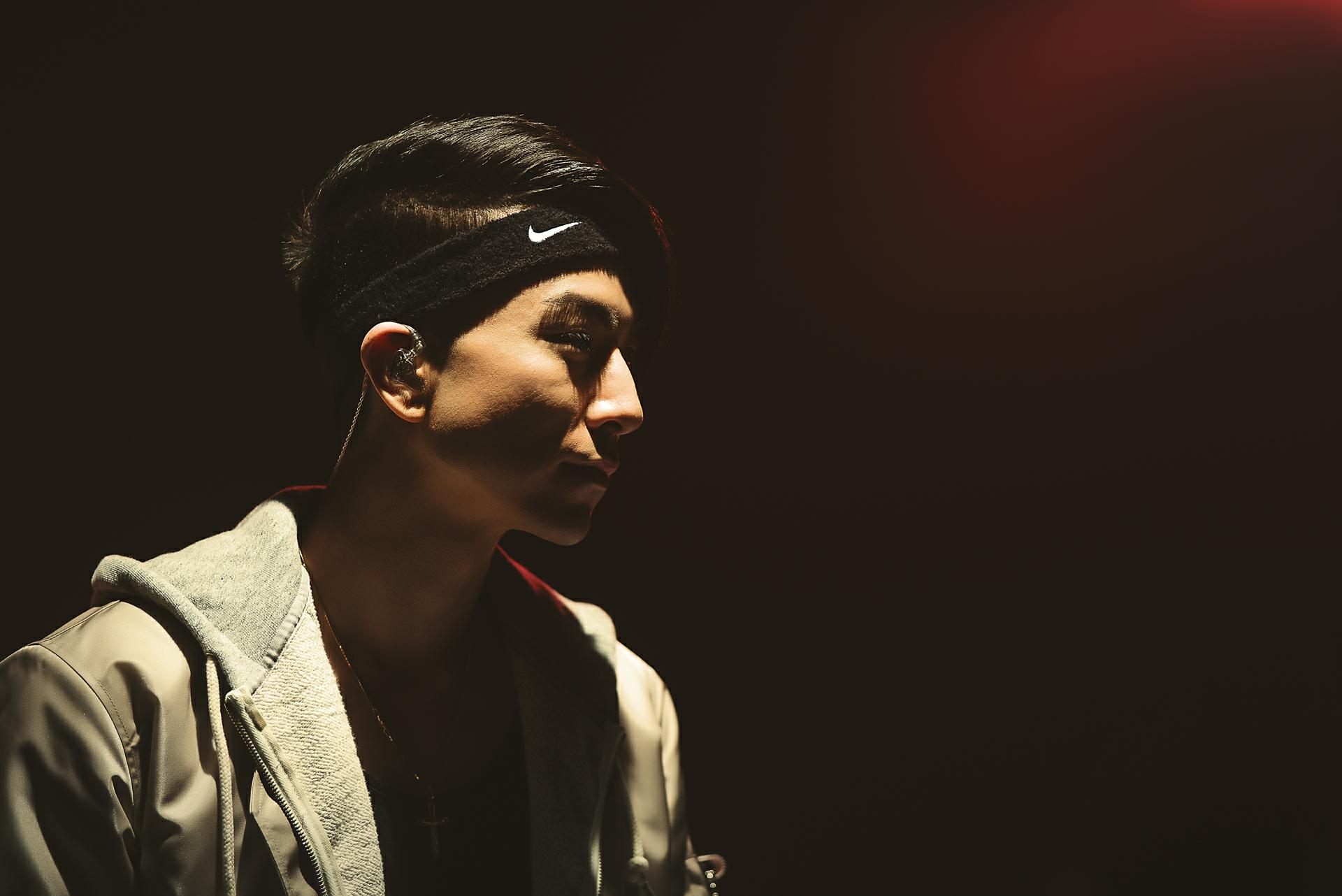
- Video still of KRNFX performing with the Eh Bee Family in 2016

Background information
- Birth name: Terry Im
- Born: May 13, 1989 (age 35); Toronto, Ontario, Canada
- Genres: Hip hop; Electronic
- Occupations: Beatboxer; singer
- Instruments: Beatboxing; Beatrhyming; Vocals; Piano; Drums; Flute
- Years active: 2007–present
- Website: www.youtube.com/KRNFX

Terry Im (born May 13, 1989), better known by his stage name KRNFX (stylised krNfx; also pronounced "Korean FX"), is a Korean-Canadian beatboxer and singer. He is perhaps best known for his participation in the first season of Canada's Got Talent in 2012, as well as winning the first Canadian Beatbox Championships in 2010 and his YouTube videos.

== Early life ==
Born in Toronto to South Korean parents, Terry grew up in a really musical family. His father played piano, his mom sang in the church choir, and both of his sisters played instruments. His dad would play piano around the house and have classical music on the radio. He was completely immersed in music, 24/7.

Some of Im's first memories of beatboxing were of him mimicking his father's piano playing and singing. It was from that point that his parents decided to nurture his joy for music and his hunger to create music, starting with the piano. He picked up the flute after the piano because both of his older sisters played the flute - he would literally pick up one of his sisters' flutes. All three siblings developed as flautists at Claude Watson School for the Arts, an auditioned public arts school for grades 4-8. After losing interest in the flute, he tried the drums and fell in love with rhythms and beats.

After learning to play the drums in Grade 7, whenever he wasn't drumming he was inclined to mimic the sounds he made while drumming with his mouth. It was probably because of his experiences with breath control from playing the flute and beats from playing the drums, that made him stand out from the other kids who were also beatboxing at the time.

His first live performances as a beatboxer, around the age of 14-15, was in high school at Earl Haig Secondary School, the sister school of CWSA. He would successfully audition for spots at the competitive school assemblies, and routinely perform for the ~2000 people school population.

== Career ==
KRNFX began his beatboxing career in 2007 at the South Korean Beatbox Championship in Seoul, where he finished the competition in first place. He then went on to win the Kollaboration event in Toronto the following year, and retained his South Korean crown in 2009.

In 2010, KRNFX competed in the Toronto Beatbox Championships and later the Canadian Beatbox Championships, both in which he finished in first place. Later in the year, he was invited to compete in the Emperor of Mic Beatbox Battle in Graz, Austria, but lost out to Spanish beatboxer Lytos in the quarter finals.

The following year, KRNFX entered the Grand Beatbox Battle in Basel, Switzerland, where he again finished in second place, and finished third in the 2011 Emperor of Mic Beatbox Battle. He returned to winning ways later in the year when he won the Red Bull Academy Culture of Clash event in Toronto, and followed up with a second consecutive Canadian Beatbox Championships title. He rose to fame in Canada when he auditioned for the first season of Canada's Got Talent in Toronto. During his performance, judges Stephan Moccio, Measha Brueggergosman and Martin Short stood up and began dancing to KRNFX's beatboxing along with the rest of the audience, and after his performance he received a standing ovation from the entire crowd. Moccio called the beatboxer "amazing", and host Dina Pugliese described the audience as the "loudest it's ever been" on the show.

In 2012, the beatboxer entered the next Grand Beatbox Battle in Basel, where he finished one place lower than the previous year, and finished in the top 16 at the Beatbox Battle World Championship in Berlin, Germany. During the course of the year, KRNFX also progressed through Canada's Got Talent and made it all the way to the finals, where he and 11 others lost to traditional dance trio Sagkeeng's Finest from Fort Alexander, Manitoba.

In 2013, KRNFX's recognition rose further, collaborating with American dancer Mike Song to make an appearance on The Ellen DeGeneres Show in March, and performing live with him at the Red Bull BC One Championships in Seoul, South Korea in December, both in which the duo performed their routine entitled "The Dancebox", in which Song dances in sync with KRNFX's beatboxing.

In 2014, KRNFX made his first appearance as a guest rapper in the online series Epic Rap Battles of History, portraying Grant Imahara in the Season 4 premiere "Ghostbusters vs. Mythbusters". He returned to the series in 2015, portraying Lao Tzu in the Season 4 episode "Eastern Philosophers vs. Western Philosophers".

KRNFX also collaborated on Walk off the Earth's cover of Taylor Swift's "I Knew You Were Trouble" in 2013 and on the same band's cover of Adele's "Hello" in 2016 .

In November 2016, KSTYLE TV uploaded the first video of KRNFX's collaborative beatboxing series, Betbaks, and released a cover of Korean girl group Blackpink's "Whistle" with singer-songwriter Megan Lee. The next Betbaks video published by KSTYLE TV was a cover of BTS' "Blood Sweat & Tears", featuring Korean-American musical composer and choreographer for YG Entertainment, Lydia Paek. For KRNFX's next video in the series, he collaborated with Justin Park, a fresh new R&B artist from 5A LABEL in Los Angeles, and the video was published on December 26, 2016. Subsequently, on January 10, 2017, his cover of Twice's "TT", another collaboration with Lydia Paek was uploaded. Following the success of Korean girl group I.O.I, he then collaborated with Choi Yoo-jung and Kim Do-yeon on a cover "Very Very Very", and the video was posted on April 25, 2017.

In 2020, KRNFX made his guest appearance in the American children's television show Ryan's Mystery Playdate. In 2023, his World of Warcraft guild "Passion" disbanded and he joined Get Carried.

== Performance in competitions ==
Beatbox competitions and events
Year	Competition	Final position
2007	South Korean Beatbox Championships	1
2008	Kollaboration	1
2009	South Korean Beatbox Championships	1
2009	Beatbox Battle World Championship	Top 16
2010	Toronto Beatbox Championships	1
2010	Canadian Beatbox Championships	1
2010	Emperor of Mic Beatbox Battle	Top 8
2011	Grand Beatbox Battle	2
2011	Emperor of Mic Beatbox Battle	3
2011	Red Bull Academy Culture Clash	1
2011	Canadian Beatbox Championships	1
2012	Canadian Beatbox Championships	Top 4
2012	Grand Beatbox Battle	Top 4
2012	Emperor of Mic Beatbox Battle	Top 8
2012	Beatbox Battle World Championship	Top 16
2012	Canada's Got Talent	Top 12
2013	Emperor of Mic Beatbox Battle	2
2015	Beatbox Battle World Championship	Top 8
