= Canada's Got Talent season 1 =

Canada's Got Talent
- Season 1
- Hosted by: Dina Pugliese
- Judges: Stephan Moccio; Measha Brueggergosman; Martin Short
- Winner: Sagkeeng's Finest
- Runners-up: Angry Candy; Freshh
- No. of episodes: 22

Release
- Original network: Citytv
- Original release: March 4 – May 14, 2012

Season chronology
- Next → Season 2

The first season of Canada's Got Talent, a reality television series, premiered on City in 2012. Unlike America's Got Talent, the show only had the audition round, Top 37, semi-finals and a finale. The premiere episode aired on March 4, 2012. It had a viewership of 2 million on average, throughout the night, which was a record for Citytv. The season ended on May 14, 2012.

The season was won by Sagkeeng's Finest, an indigenous dance troupe from Fort Alexander, Manitoba.

== Format ==
=== Auditions ===
The auditions took place in front of the judges, and a live audience, in different cities across Canada. At any time during the audition, the judges show their disapproval to the act by pressing a buzzer, which lights a large red "X" on the stage. If all the judges pressed their buzzers, the act must end. Voting worked on a majority-of-two basis, where two positive votes from the judges were required.

=== The Cutdown ===
The acts accepted past the audition moved on to the Judges Round (also known as "The Cutdown"). This stage of the competition did not feature any audiences, and only contained contestants performing in front of the judges. Out of all that made it to this point, thirty-six acts made it through to the next round, which was the semi-finals.

=== Semi-finals ===
The semi-finals and final were broadcast with a varying number of semi-finals, followed by the one final split into two episodes over one night. The remaining acts performed across a number of semi-finals, with the two most popular acts from each semi-final winning a position in the final. Judges could end a performance early with three X's. The judges were asked to express their views on each act's performance. Phone lines, Twitter, Facebook, texting and online voting platforms opened for a one-hour after all acts performed, while the public voted for the act they thought were the best. Voters could submit a total of fifty votes (ten in each platform). After the votes were counted, the act that polled the highest number of public votes automatically, was placed in the final. The judges then chose between the second and third most popular acts, with the winner of that vote also gaining a place in the final. All other acts were then eliminated from the competition.

== Judges and hosts ==
It was announced that Martin Short would be one of three judges this season on October 13, 2011. Four days later, Stephan Moccio and Measha Brueggergosman were confirmed to be the other two judges. The same day, Dina Pugliese, co-host of Breakfast Television, was announced as the host for the show.

== Broadcasting ==
Because of the various time zones in Canada, only viewers in the provinces and territories east of Manitoba saw the show live (in the Newfoundland, Atlantic and Eastern time zones). All other areas in Canada broadcast the show on a tape delay basis. All Citytv stations aired the show at 8:00 p.m. (in each time zone where there is a Citytv station) with the Toronto station airing the program at 8:00 p.m. Viewers in Newfoundland saw the show live at 9:30 p.m., and viewers in the Atlantic region at 9:00 p.m., because there is no Citytv station in these provinces to broadcast the show at local time. The same process occurred with the results show.

== Season overview ==
=== Auditions ===
==== Preliminary auditions ====
Canada's Got Talent traveled to six different cities across the country for the producer auditions: Winnipeg, Edmonton, Vancouver, Montreal, Toronto and Halifax, during the months of September and October 2011.

After the final auditions were completed in Halifax, the show then traveled to Calgary, Vancouver, Toronto, Winnipeg, Halifax and Montreal for the live-audience auditions (which were taped in October, November, December 2011 and January 2012).

A total of 244 acts were given a "yes" during the auditions. A total of 108 auditions were aired on television (both eliminated acts and successful acts).

=== Judges round ===
The acts accepted past the audition round moved on to the Judges Round (also known as "The Cutdown"). This stage of the competition did not feature any audiences, and only contained contestants walking up to the judges or Dina (host) to find out if they made it to the next round. Originally, of the acts that made it to this point, thirty-six acts made it through to the next round which would be the semi-finals. However, because the judges "broke a rule", the final number of semi-finalists were thirty-seven. During the episode, it was announced that 244 acts were given a "yes" during the auditions, meaning 207 were eliminated (some of these auditions were not shown on television).

The judges could not decide between two similar acts. Scott Jackson and KRNFX (who were both beatboxers), were both called up to the judges and told that in order to determine who would make the live shows, they would have to beatbox right then. After both acts finished, the judges still could not decide, opting to have both of them advance.

Good for Grapes were initially semifinalists, but they had to drop out for personal reasons. Volodymyr Martynouk served as their replacement, but he suffered a fall shortly before the semifinals began, meaning he could not make it due to his recovery time.

=== Semi-finals ===
At this point in the competition, the selected thirty-seven acts performed in front of an audience and the judges. The semi-finals contained six or seven acts per week for six weeks, with the day after being the results show. Each week, out of the acts that perform, only two made it to the finals. To determine who moved to the finals, home viewers selected one act, and the judges selected the other.

Participant	Age(s)	Genre	Act	Semi-Final	Result
Angela Ewtushik and Rally	39 & 7	Animals	Dog Act	5	Eliminated
Angry Candy	27-37	Singing	Band	2	Runner-Up
Aygul Memet	36	Acrobatics	Acrobat	5	Finalist
The Brat Pack	14-18	Dance	Dance Group	3	Eliminated
Broken Dance	19-25	Dance	Dance Group	6	Finalist
Caitlin Bell	N/A	Singing	Singer	3	Eliminated
Christopher Charles	29	Singing	Singer	1	Eliminated
Craz E Crew Stunt Team	N/A	Danger	Stunt Bike Team	3	Eliminated
Daddy Cool	27-51	Dance	Dance Group	2	Eliminated
The Dance and Illusions of Oslen	36	Magic	Illusionist	4	Eliminated
Emilio Fina	38	Singing	Opera Singer	3	Finalist
Enigma Dance	18-25	Dance	Dance Group	3	Eliminated
Eric Saintonge	37	Acrobatics	Cyr Wheel Acrobat	5	Eliminated
Fantasy Circus	8-42	Acrobatics	Circus Group	2	Eliminated
The Forestier Family	7-58	Music	Musicians	4	Eliminated
Francelle and Mat	23 & 32	Music	Yodeler and Guitarist	6	Eliminated
Freshh	12-17	Dance	Dance Group	2	Runner-Up
H.I.X.	19-21	Music	Beatboxing Group	1	Eliminated
Ivan Daigle	41	Singing	Singer and Guitarist	4	Finalist
Jack Ettlinger	18	Singing	Singer	6	Eliminated
Jeffrey and Karen Chang	N/A	Dance	Dance Duo	5	Eliminated
Julie Lafontaine	45	Singing	Opera Singer	2	Finalist
KRNFX	22	Music	Beatboxer	5	Finalist
Laheeb Quddusi	23	Comedy	Impressionist	6	Eliminated
Lisa Odjig	37	Dance	Hula-Hoop Dancer	4	Eliminated
Marianne Demers	15	Singing	Singer	6	Eliminated
Marissa Puff	26	Danger	Fire Dancer	1	Eliminated
Mathew Cathcart "The Emsee"	21	Music	Rapper	4'	Finalist
Nathan Knowles	16	Acrobatics	Aerialist	3	Eliminated
Oneblood	18-50	Music	A Cappella Group	3	Eliminated
Pulp City Inn	17-22	Singing	Band	1	Eliminated
Roger LeBlanc	23	Variety	Actor	2	Eliminated
Sagkeeng's Finest	16-17	Dance	Tap Dance Trio	5	Winner
Scott Jackson	24	Music	Beatboxer	2	Finalist
Shale Wagman	11	Dance	Dancer	3	Finalist
Silvia Ricciotto	49	Singing	Singer	5	Eliminated
Vithou Thurber-Promtep	16	Singing	Singer	2	Eliminated
Wushu by Storm	18-34	Danger	Martial Arts Group	1	Eliminated
Yuval Fichman	46	Music	Pianist	2	Eliminated

- Caitlin Bell and Mathew Cathcart "The Emsee" were selected to join the competition from the Last Chance YouTube auditions.

==== Semi-finals summary ====
Buzzed Out | Judges' choice |
Advanced | Won Judges' Vote | Lost Judges' Vote

==== Week 1 (April 2–3, 2012) ====
Semi-Finalist	Order	Buzzes and Judges' votes			Result
Semi-Finalist	Order	Short	Brueggergosman	Moccio	Result
Wushu By Storm	1				Eliminated (Lost Judges' Vote)
H.I.X.	2				Eliminated
Pulp City Inn	3				Eliminated
Marissa Puff	4				Eliminated
Christopher Charles	5				Eliminated
Freshh	6				Advanced
Julie Lafontaine	7				Advanced (Won Judges' Vote)

==== Week 2 (April 8–9, 2012) ====
Semi-Finalist	Order	Buzzes and Judges' votes			Result
Semi-Finalist	Order	Short	Brueggergosman	Moccio	Result
Scott Jackson	1				Advanced (Won Judges' Vote)
Daddy Cool	2				Eliminated (Lost Judges' Vote)
Roger LeBlanc	3				Eliminated
Angry Candy	4				Advanced
Yuval Fichman	5				Eliminated
Vithou Thurber-Promtep	6				Eliminated
Fantasy Circus	7				Eliminated

==== Week 3 (April 15–16, 2012) ====
Semi-Finalist	Order	Buzzes and Judges' votes			Result
Semi-Finalist	Order	Short	Brueggergosman	Moccio	Result
Craz E Crew Stunt Team	1				Eliminated
Emilio Fina	2				Advanced (Won Judges' Vote)
Nathan Knowles	3				Eliminated
The Brat Pack	4				Eliminated (Lost Judges' Vote)
Oneblood	5				Eliminated
Caitlin Bell	6				Eliminated
Shale Wagman	7				Advanced

==== Week 4 (April 22–23, 2012) ====
Semi-Finalist	Order	Buzzes and Judges' votes			Result
Semi-Finalist	Order	Short	Brueggergosman	Moccio	Result
The Dance and Illusions of Oslen	1				Eliminated
The Forestier Family	2				Eliminated
Enigma Dance	3				Eliminated (Lost Judges' Vote)
Mathew Cathcart	4				Advanced (Won Judges' Vote)
Ivan Daigle	5				Advanced
Lisa Odjig	6				Eliminated

==== Week 5 (April 29–30, 2012) ====
Semi-Finalist	Order	Buzzes and Judges' votes			Result
Semi-Finalist	Order	Short	Brueggergosman	Moccio	Result
Eric Saintonge	1				Eliminated
KRNFX	2				Advanced (Won Judges' Vote)
Sagkeeng's Finest	3				Advanced
Silvia Ricciotto	4				Eliminated
Angela Ewtushik and Rally	5				Eliminated (Lost Judges' Vote)
Jeffrey & Karen Chang	6				Eliminated

==== Week 6 (May 6–7, 2012) ====
Semi-Finalist	Order	Buzzes and Judges' votes			Result
Semi-Finalist	Order	Short	Brueggergosman	Moccio	Result
Jack Ettlinger	1				Eliminated (Lost Judges' Vote)
Broken Dance	2				Advanced
Laheeb Quddusi	3				Eliminated
Francelle and Mat	4				Eliminated
Aygul Memet	5				Advanced (Won Judges' Vote)
Marianne Demers	6				Eliminated

=== Finals Summary ===
Only 12 acts made it to this point in the competition. After all the acts performed in the two-hour special on May 13, 2012, Canada voted for their favourite, and the winner of Canada's Got Talent's first season was crowned on May 14, 2012, on the finale of the show. The winner received a brand-new Nissan GT-R, possibly a performance in Las Vegas, a spot on Citytv's 2013 New Year's Eve Bash and $100,000 in Canadian currency.

The youngest platinum-selling recording artist in history, Jackie Evancho, who was a finalist on Season 5 of America's Got Talent, sang the Sarah McLachlan song "Angel" as a guest artist on the season finale on May 14. Canadian rock band Hedley performed the song "Beautiful" from their album Storms.

Winner | Runner-up

Finalist	Order	Result
Sagkeeng's Finest	1	Winner
Terry Im "KRNFX"	2	Eliminated
Julie Lafontaine	3	Eliminated
Aygul Memet	4	Eliminated
Ivan Daigle	5	Eliminated
Broken Dance	6	Eliminated
Shale Wagman	7	Eliminated
Scott Jackson	8	Eliminated
Angry Candy	9	Runner-up
Mathew Cathcart "The Emsee"	10	Eliminated
Emilio Fina	11	Eliminated
Freshh	12	Runner-up

== Production ==
On May 30, 2011, Citytv and Insight Production announced that they would create a Canadian series of the hit Got Talent series and that the show would begin in spring 2012.

=== Revival ===
In June 2012, Rogers Media president, Scott Moore, announced that a second season would not be produced, after a "careful consideration of all factors, including the current economic climate". However, on June 8, 2021, it was announced that the series would be revived, first announced to be returning in spring 2022. Production on the series took place in fall 2021 at Niagara Falls.

On December 31, 2021, it was announced that the revival would premiere in March 2022, with it later specified as March 22.

== Ratings ==
Order	Episode	Viewers (millions)	Rank (night)	Rank (week)
1	"Toronto Auditions"	1.463	2	15
2	"Calgary Auditions"	1.120	—N/a	23
3	"Vancouver (Part 1) Auditions"	0.953	—N/a	23
4	"Winnipeg Auditions"	1.124	5	23
5	"Halifax and Vancouver (Part 2) Auditions"	0.829	8	31+
6	"Toronto Auditions (Part 2)"	0.981	—N/a	31+
7	"Montreal Auditions"	0.940	—N/a	31+
8	"Cutdown Episode"	0.754	—N/a	31+
9	"Semi-Final 1"	0.690	—N/a	31+
10	"Semi-Final 1 Results"	0.451	—N/a	31+
11	"Semi-Final 2"	0.559	—N/a	31+
12	"Semi-Final 2 Results"	0.271	—N/a	31+
13	"Semi-Final 3"	0.612	—N/a	31+
14	"Semi-Final 3 Results"	0.270	—N/a	31+
15	"Semi-Final 4"	0.573	—N/a	31+
16	"Semi-Final 4 Results"	0.286	15	31+
17	"Semi-Final 5"	0.561	12	31+
18	"Semi-Final 5 Results"	0.311	14	31+
19	"Semi-Final 6"	0.308	14	31+
20	"Semi-Final 6 Results"	0.326	11	31+
21	"Live Finals 2-Hr Show"	0.521	9	31+
22	"Finale"	0.459	10	—N/a
