= Canada's Got Talent season 3 =

Canada's Got Talent
- Season 3
- Promotional poster for season 3, featuring (L to R) judges Offishall, Stratus, Mandel, Singh, and host Ell
- Hosted by: Lindsay Ell
- Judges: Kardinal Offishall; Trish Stratus; Lilly Singh; Howie Mandel
- Winner: Conversion
- Runners-up: The Cast; The Turnbull Brothers
- No. of episodes: 9

Release
- Original network: Citytv
- Original release: March 21 – May 16, 2023

Season chronology
- ← Previous; Season 2 Next → Season 4

The third season (Note: Promoted by Citytv as season 2, treating the run that began in 2022 as a distinct series from the version that aired in 2012.) of Canada's Got Talent, is a reality television series. The season premiered on March 21, 2023.

The season was won by Conversion, a dance group from Trois-Rivières, Quebec.

== Format ==
=== Auditions ===
The auditions took place in front of the judges and a live audience. At any time during the audition, the judges showed their disapproval of the act by pressing a buzzer, which lights a large red "X" on the stage. If all the judges pressed their buzzers, the act must end. Voting worked on a majority-of-three basis, where three positive votes from the judges were required. The Golden Buzzer is placed in the center of the stage, and each judge (or the host) can only press the Golden Buzzer once, sending an act straight to the semi-finals.

=== Semi-finals ===
The semi-finals and final were broadcast through three episodes, two semi-finals and one finale. Judges could still end a performance early with four Xs. The acts competed for three judge votes that sent them straight to the finals, and the rest competed for a Canada-wide vote that dictated the rest of the finalists. The judges were asked to express their views on each act's performance. Phone lines, Twitter, Facebook, texting and online voting platforms opened for one-hour after all acts were performed. The public voted for the act they thought was the best. Voters could submit a total of fifty votes (ten in each platform). After the votes were counted, the act that polled the highest number of public votes, automatically was placed in the final. The judges then chose between the second and third most popular acts, with the winner of that vote also gaining a place in the final. All other acts were then eliminated from the competition.

=== The Finals ===
The acts who made it through the semifinals have a final shot at performing once again, and all of the acts competed for a Canada-wide vote that determined the winner of the season. This round has been broadcast live, and the winner is revealed at the end of the episode.

== Judges and host ==
Judges for Canada's Got Talent (season 3)

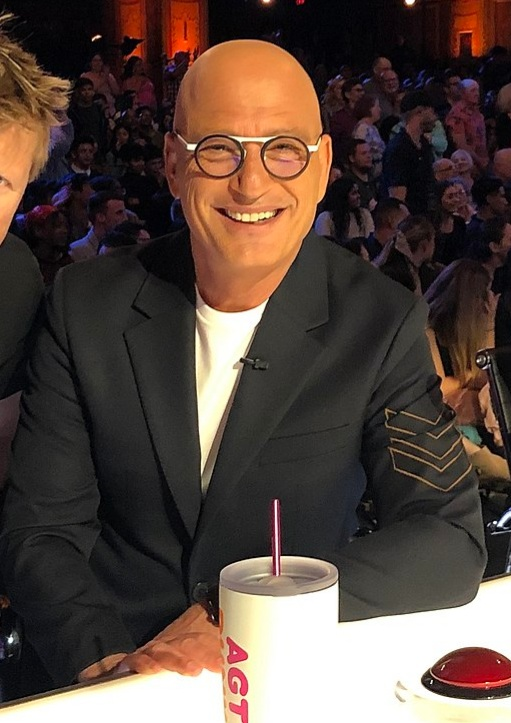
Howie Mandel

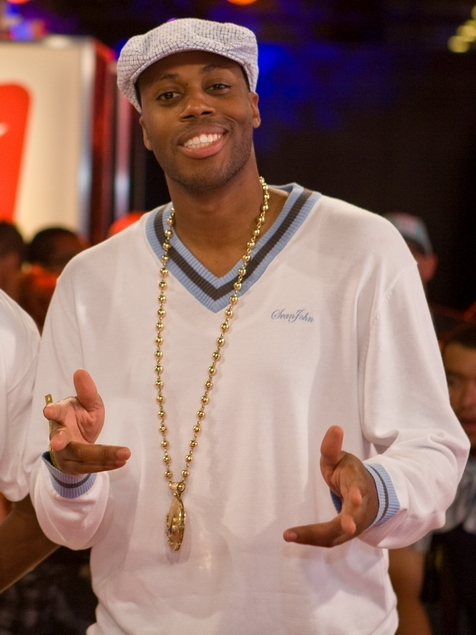
Kardinal Offishall

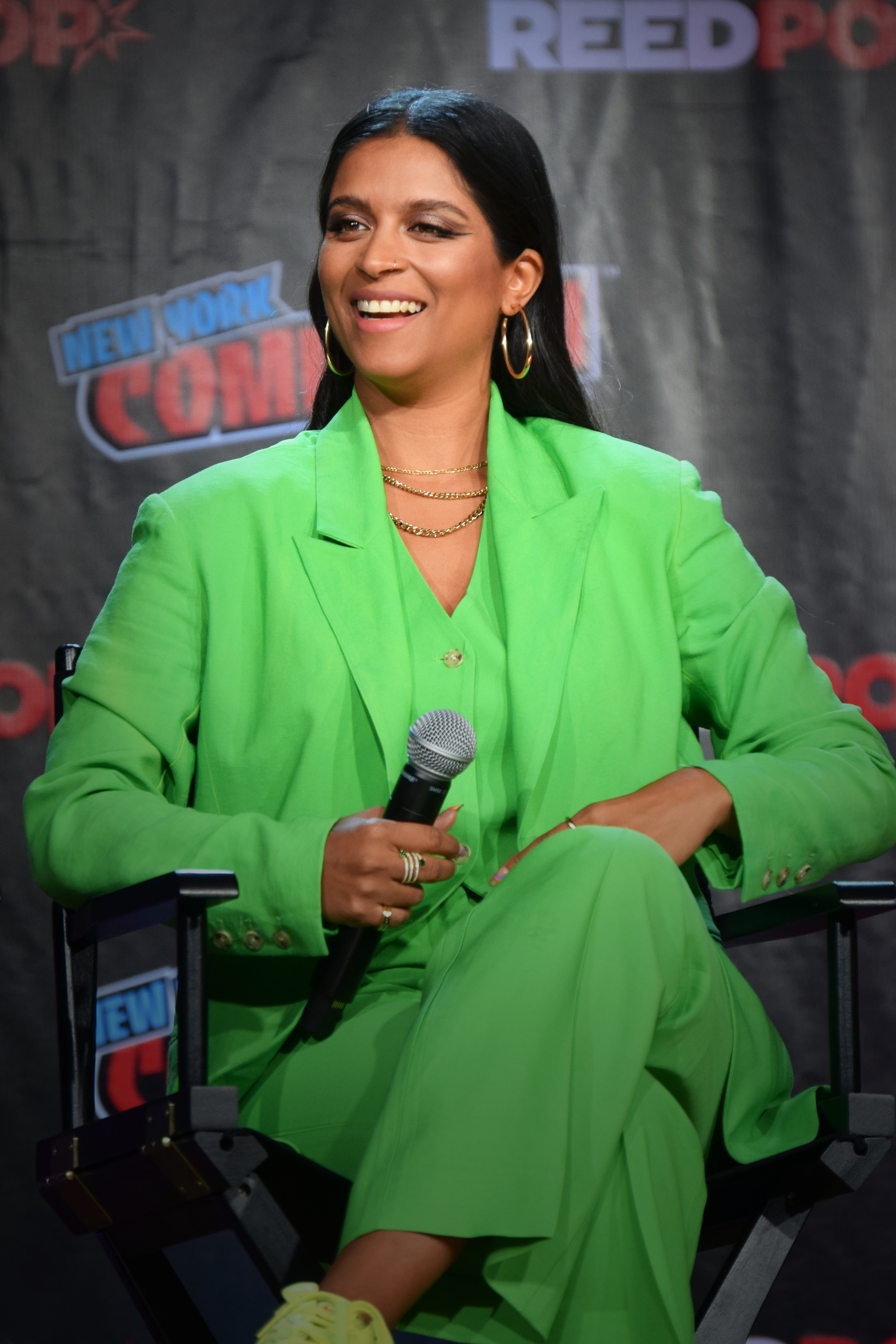
Lilly Singh

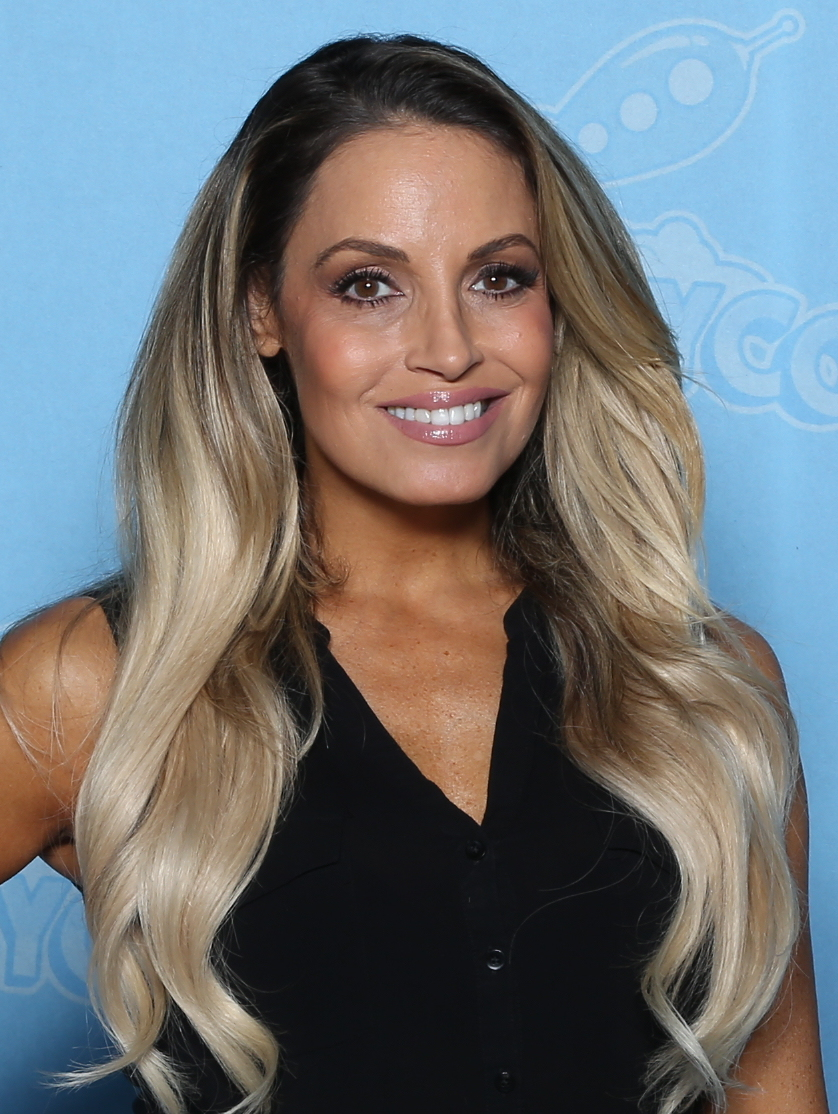
Trish Stratus

The show premiered with the same judges and host as the previous season.

== Season overview ==
Judge Lilly Singh gave her Golden Buzzer to aerial acrobatics duo Woody & Fenton in the fifth episode. Due to an injury, the act had to withdraw from the competition.

Winner | Runner-up | Third place | 4th place |
Finalist | Semi-finalist | Golden Buzzer (Auditions)

Participant	Genre	Act	From	Semi-Final	Result
Alexandra Côté	Animals	Dog Act	Thetford Mines, QC	1	Eliminated
Anica	Singing	Singer	Grand-Barachois, NB	2	Eliminated
Atsushi Ono	Magic	Magician	Calgary, AB	1	Finalist
Beatrice Love	Singing	Singer	Edmonton, AB	1	Eliminated
Conversion	Dance	Dance Group	Trois-Rivières, QC	1	Winner
Cool Giraffes	Dance	Dance Group	Edmonton, AB	1	Finalist
Curran Dobbs	Comedy	Comedian	Victoria, BC	2	Eliminated
GBA	Acrobatics	Acrobatic Group	Montreal, QC	2	Eliminated
Geneviève Coté	Music	Vocalist	Laval, QC	2	Finalist
Katherine Lynn-Rose	Singing	Singer	Burlington, ON	2	Eliminated
Magic Ben	Magic	Magician	Whitehorse, YT	2	Eliminated
Maya Gamzu	Singing	Singer	Richmond Hill, ON	1	Eliminated
Meave	Singing	Singer	Niagara Falls, ON	2	Fourth place
Mr. Cuddles	Comedy	Ventriloquist	Gibsons, BC	1	Eliminated
Paola Troilo	Singing	Opera Singer	Laval, QC	1	Eliminated
Raymond Salgado	Singing	Singer	Vancouver Island, BC	2	Finalist
The Cast	Dance	Dance Group	Lévis, QC	2	Runner-up
The Turnbull Brothers	Singing	Singing Duo	Glace Bay, NS	1	Third place

=== Semi-finals summary ===
Buzzed Out | Advanced (Won the Judges' Vote) | Advanced (Won the Public's Vote)

==== Semi-final 1 (May 2) ====
Participant	Order	Buzzes and Judges' votes				Result
Participant	Order	Mandel	Singh	Stratus	Offishall	Result
Alexandra Côté	1					Eliminated
Maya Gamzu	2					Eliminated
Cool Giraffes	3					Advanced
The Turnbull Brothers	4					Advanced
Atsushi Ono	5					Advanced
Beatrice Love	6					Eliminated
Paola Troilo	7					Eliminated
Mr. Cuddles	8					Eliminated
Conversion	9					Advanced

==== Semi-final 2 (May 9) ====
Participant	Order	Buzzes and Judges' votes				Result
Participant	Order	Mandel	Singh	Stratus	Offishall	Result
The Cast	1					Advanced
Raymond Salgado	2					Advanced
GBA	3					Eliminated
Katherine Lynn-Rose	4					Eliminated
Meave	5					Advanced
Magic Ben	6					Eliminated
Curran Dobbs	7					Eliminated
Anica	8					Eliminated
Geneviève Coté	9					Advanced

=== Live Finale (May 16) ===
Winner | Runner-up | 3rd place | 4th place | Finalist

Finalist	Result (May 16)
The Cast	Runner-up
The Turnbull Brothers	Third place
Meave	Fourth place
Geneviève Coté	Finalist
Conversion	Winner
Atsushi Ono	Finalist
Cool Giraffes	Finalist
Raymond Salgado	Finalist

== Production ==
On September 14, 2022, Canada's Got Talent confirmed filming a new season, with Lindsay Ell hosting the show, and the same judges from the previous season. Production remained at the Niagara Fallsview Casino Resort, but was re-located to its newly-opened OLG Stage concert hall. The auditions started on October 19, and concluded on October 23. All shows were reportedly sold-out.

== Ratings ==
Order	Episode	Viewers (millions)	Rank (night)	Rank (week)
1	"Prepare to Be Amazed!"	0.539	—N/a	—N/a
2	"The Magic Continues"	0.574	—N/a	—N/a
3	"So Many Emotions"	TBA	TBA	TBA
4	"Kids in the House"	TBA	TBA	TBA
5	"World Class"	TBA	TBA	TBA
6	"For the People"	TBA	TBA	TBA
7	"1st Semi-Final"	0.476	—N/a	—N/a
8	"2nd Semi-Final"	TBA	TBA	TBA
9	"The Finale"	TBA	TBA	TBA
