= Chris Doyle =

Chris Doyle may refer to:

- Chris Doyle (artist) (1971–2025), American multi-media artist
- Chris Doyle (footballer) (born 1995), English footballer
- Christopher Doyle (born 1952), Australian cinematographer
- Chris Doyle (American football) (born 1968), American football coach
- Christopher Justin Doyle (born 1974), professionally known as Mysterion the Mind Reader, Canadian mentalist
