= Mary Barry (singer) =

Canadian singer and songwriter (born 1955)

- Born: May 5, 1955 (age 70); St. John's, Newfoundland and Labrador, Canada
- Genres: Jazz, blues, chanson
- Occupations: Singer, songwriter, voice artist
- Instruments: Voice, piano
- Years active: 1980–present
- Label: Aurora Music
- Website: marybarry.ca

Mary Barry (born May 5, 1955) is a Canadian singer and songwriter. She sings in English, French and German.

She was born in St. John's, Newfoundland and Labrador and is one of five children to parents Patrick Barry and Teresa Barry. She attended high school at Holy Heart before studying Languages and French Literature at Memorial University. In 1982, she graduated from Vancouver Community College's Jazz and Commercial Music program.

In 2004, Barry released "These Days", for which she garnered Female Artist of the Year Award at the Music Industry Association of Newfoundland & Labrador Awards. The album, produced by Vancouver stalwart Rick Kilburn, arranged by Miles Black, and recorded with Jesse Zubot, Graham Ord and Craig Scott, also features five award-winning songs, and received an ECMA nomination for Jazz Recording of the Year. She performed with singer Holly Hogan in 2007 at the Writers at Woody Point Festival in Gros Morne National Park. Mark Peddle played both electric and acoustic bass guitar on Barry's 2007 album Red Eye Tonight. The album, also nominated for ECMA Jazz Recording of the Year, was her second. She won two awards at the 2007 MusicNL awards: Female Artist of the Year and Jazz and Blues Artist of the Year. She also performed at the corresponding awards show that year. In 2008, she performed at the launch of a literary salon at Water Street's Coffee and Company. She was again nominated for the title of Female Artist of the Year at the 2010 MusicNL awards. The other nominees were Kellie Loder, Teresa Ennis, Irene Bridger, and Amelia Curran. On January 23, 2010, Barry performed at a concert in support of relief efforts after the 2010 Haiti earthquake. In February, 2010, she performed at the 2010 Vancouver Olympics, after releasing her first full length recording in French, "Chansons Irisées", also nominated for 2011 ECMA Francophone Recording of the Year. On November 22, 2013, Mary Barry released "Legendary", which was nominated for Jazz Recording of the Year at the 2014 Music NL Awards.

In November 2015, Barry announced that she had pulmonary fibrosis, a progressive lung disease, for which she travelled to Germany for treatment. Despite this prognosis she continues to write and perform, and in September 2017, Mary Barry was inducted into the Wreckhouse Jazz and Blues Hall of Fame. Mary is currently in pre-production for the upcoming release of her sixth independent recording in 2021 featuring the Atlantic String Quartet.

== Recordings ==
- Mary Barry (2000)
- These Days (2003)
- Red Eye Tonight (2007)
- Chansons Irisées (2010)
- Legendary (2013)
