= Jeanick Fournier =

Canadian singer (born 1972)

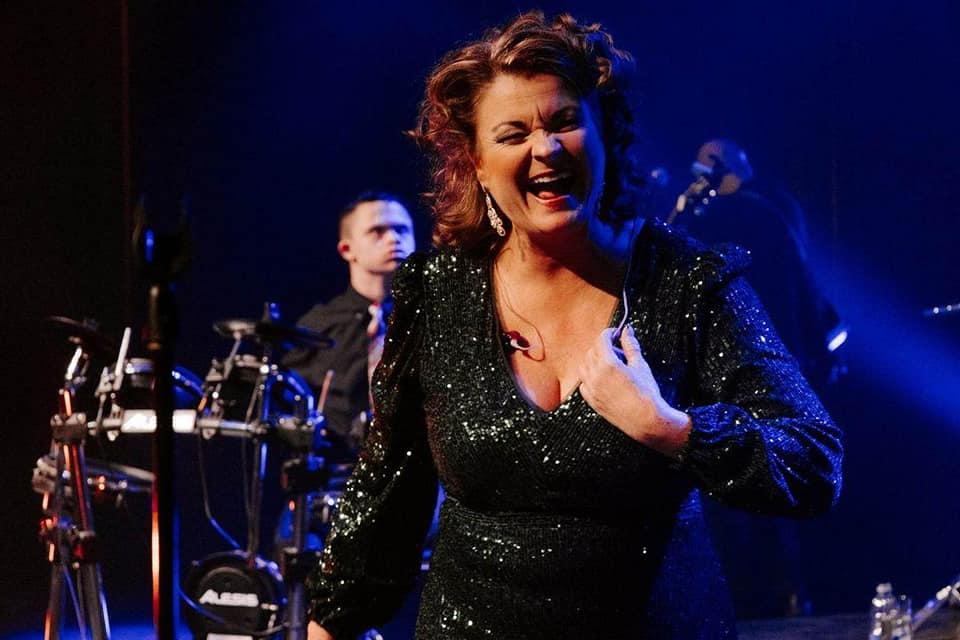

Background information
- Born: May 20, 1972 (age 53)
- Origin: Saguenay, Quebec, Canada
- Genres: Pop
- Occupations: Musician; Palliative care attendant
- Instrument: Vocals
- Years active: 2006–present
- Label: Universal Music Canada

Jeanick Fournier (born May 20, 1972) is a Canadian singer from Saguenay, Quebec, most noted as the winner of the second season of Canada's Got Talent.

Fournier, who works as a palliative care attendant in Saguenay and is the adoptive mother of two children with Down syndrome, grew up in the small town of Dolbeau-Mistassini and later moved to the Saguenay borough of Chicoutimi in adulthood. She has performed in Quebec for a number of years, most notably in a Céline Dion tribute show.

In 2012, Jeanick Fournier was approached to participate in the French show's second season The Voice: la plus belle voix. She has been on tour since 2006 with a show entirely devoted to Celine Dion. Fournier is directly selected to be one of the 140 finalists. Having revealed her selection to the press, her audition was canceled the next day.

In 2019, she also launched Cinq divas, a show in which her Dion repertoire was supplemented with songs by Ginette Reno, Lara Fabian, Whitney Houston and Lady Gaga. She released the album Mes coups de cœur, a collection of covers of some of her favourite songs which included one original song written by Fournier and Véronique Gagné, in 2015.

== Canada's Got Talent ==
In her first Canada's Got Talent appearance, she auditioned with Dion's "I Surrender", and was given the golden buzzer by host Lindsay Ell. On her first day back at her job in palliative care after the appearance, she sang Dion's "S'il suffisait d'aimer" for one of her patients, attracting additional media attention when the patient's daughter uploaded a video of the performance to social media; a few days later, her first musical performance since the television appearance, at the Calypso club in the Saguenay borough of Jonquière, attracted a record audience, with fully 40 per cent of the patrons indicating that they had bought tickets to the show after seeing her Canada's Got Talent performance.

In the semifinals she performed the song "Never Enough" from the film The Greatest Showman, and in the finale she performed Queen's "The Show Must Go On". She was announced the final winner, over dance troupe The Renegades in third place and singer-songwriter Kellie Loder in second place.

=== Performances and results ===
Week	Song choice	Original artist	Order number	Result
Audition	"I Surrender"	Celine Dion		Golden Buzzer
Semifinals	"Never Enough"	Loren Allred	9	Advanced
Final	"The Show Must Go On"	Queen	3	Winner

=== Post-Talent ===
After her appearances on Canada's Got Talent, Fournier signed with the record company Universal Music Canada. Her self-titled major label debut album was released in October 2022, and debuted at #13 on the Canadian Albums Chart.

The album includes duets with Ell on a cover of Faith Hill's song "Paris", and Maxime Landry on a cover of Daniel Balavoine's "Tous les cris, les S.O.S.", as well as "I Surrender" and songs first recorded by Amanda Marshall, Roxette, Sam Brown, Laurence Jalbert and Cyndi Lauper.

In November 2022, it was announced that Fournier would be a competitor in the 2023 season of America's Got Talent: All-Stars.

In 2023, she participated in an all-star recording of Serena Ryder's single "What I Wouldn't Do", which was released as a charity single to benefit Kids Help Phone's Feel Out Loud campaign for youth mental health. Her second major-label album, Vivante, was released in May 2023. On September 9, 2023, Fournier performed for Conservative Party of Canada delegates at their annual convention in Quebec City.

== Discography ==
=== Albums ===
List of studio albums, with selected details and chart positions
Title	Details	Peak chart positions	Sales
Title	Details	CAN	Sales
Mes coups de cœur	Released: May 15, 2015; Label: Independent; Format: CD, Digital download	–	
Jeanick Fournier	Released: October 7, 2022; Label: Universal; Format: CD, Digital download	13	CAN: 2,000
Vivante	Released: May 19, 2023; Label: Universal; Format: CD, Digital download	—	

=== Singles ===
List of singles
Title	Year	Album
"I Surrender"	2022	Jeanick Fournier
"I’ll Never Love Again"	2022	Non-album single
"Ne m’oublie pas"	2023	Vivante
