= Anyday =

Canadian rock band

- Origin: Springdale, Newfoundland and Labrador, Canada
- Genres: Christian rock, pop rock
- Years active: 2009–2011
- Labels: Broken
- Members: Glenn Thomas; Devin Robinson; Clint Curtis

Anyday was a rock band from Springdale, Newfoundland and Labrador, Canada. The band's music fell into the Christian rock and pop rock genres. The three members of the band were Glenn Thomas, Devin Robinson, and Clint Curtis.

== History ==
The band formed in 2009. On November 14, 2009, Anyday performed alongside Kellie Loder at a benefit concert at Springdale's Indian River High School.

In 2010, the band announced that it had signed with Nashville-based contemporary Christian record label Broken Records but, that year, it released its debut album Got Extraordinary under Sweet Music. According to the website of Clint Curtis, the band performed in Nashville in 2011; in 2012, Curtis left Anyday to form the band Sevenview.
