= Seth Zosky =

Canadian singer and actor

- Education: Sheridan College
- Occupation(s): Singer, actor
- Years active: 2020–present

Seth Zosky is a singer, actor, and musician. He rose to prominence as a member of the R&B/pop band "CZN", who were chosen as winners of Canadian Family's Got Talent by Simon Cowell. Zosky also originated the role of Jack Dawson in the original Canadian production of Titanique.

== Life ==
Zosky was raised in Toronto, and is Jewish. He graduated from the musical theatre program at Sheridan College in 2021.

== Career ==
=== Music ===
While enrolled at Sheridan College, a music theory and performance professor suggested Zosky, CJ Capital, and Matthew Novary Joseph noted their complementary vocal styles and suggested they work together. This led to the formation of CZN, a R&B/pop trio band.

In 2020, Zosky and CZN competed on Canadian Family's Got Talent, which was presented during the COVID-19 pandemic by Breakfast Television. The band was announced as the winner on May 26, 2020, with Simon Cowell commenting, "... I think you’re very current, I think you’re very cool, I think you’re very likeable. Most importantly talented, creative, inventive...". Later in 2020, CZN released their first single "Friends".

The group also competed in season 16 of America's Got Talent. At the auditions, they performed JP Saxe and Julia Michaels' If the World Was Ending. They received four 'yes' votes from the judges to advance to the next round, but were ultimately eliminated during the judges' deliberations.

=== Musical theatre ===
In 2022, Zosky had his first professional stage role when he starred as Jamie in a regional production of The Last Five Years opposite AJ Bridel. He reprised his role of Jamie in another production of The Last Five Years presented by Blue Bridge Productions.

In 2024, Zosky co-wrote and performed in Pain to Power: A Kanye West Musical Protest, which was presented at the Winnipeg Jewish Theatre. The musical was written as a response to West's controversial statements about Jewish people and slavery, and uses West's music to discuss celebrity influence and questioning at what point a fan can no longer separate the art from the artist.

Zosky is currently starring as Jack Dawson in the original Canadian production of Titanique. The musical premiered at the Segal Centre in Montreal, where it is playing between October 27 and November 24, 2024. It will then transfer to the CAA Theatre, where it will play between December 5, 2024 and January 12, 2025.

== Theatre credits ==
Year	Production	Role	Theatre	Category	Ref.
2022	The Last Five Years	Jamie	Regional: Olive Branch Productions		
2023	The Last Five Years	Jamie	Roxy Theatre	Regional: Blue Bridge Productions	
2023	Fiddler on the Roof	Perchik	Hamilton Family Theatre Cambridge	Regional: Drayton Entertainment	
2024	Pain to Power: A Kanye West Musical Protest		Regional: Winnipeg Jewish Theatre		
2024–2025	Titanique	Jack Dawson	Segal Centre for Performing Arts	Mirvish Productions	
2024–2025	Titanique	Jack Dawson	CAA Theatre	Mirvish Productions	
