= Mark Peddle =

- Origin: St. John's, Newfoundland and Labrador, Canada
- Occupation: Musician
- Instrument(s): Acoustic bass guitar, bass guitar, drum kit

Mark Peddle is a musician from downtown St. John's, Newfoundland and Labrador, Canada. He played both electric and acoustic bass guitar on Mary Barry's 2007 album Red Eye Tonight. He also appeared as a guest performer on the album People Get Ready by Kelly-Ann Evans and Janet Cull in 2008. He performed bass as backup for the Ladies of Jazz in 2008 and again in 2009. In 2009, Peddle met with Contemporary Christian musician Kellie Loder to help her with her second album, Imperfections & Directions. In 2011, Peddle performed at the concert The Show Must Go On: The Music of Queen at Newfoundland's Garrick Theatre. Peddle is the drummer for the band Drenalin. He is also a member of the band Bill Brennan and the Banda Brazil. Peddle has been photographed by Bud Gaulton.
