= Conversion (dance group) =

Canadian dance group

Conversion is a Canadian dance group from Trois-Rivières, Quebec, who won the third season of Canada's Got Talent in 2023.

Associated with the District 5 dance studio in Trois-Rivières, they are trained by Vincent Desjardins. The 37-member group, who perform carefully synchronized storytelling routines, auditioned with a routine about the struggles of Desjardins and his wife to conceive a baby with the aid of fertility treatments, set to a recording of the baby's heartbeat. They received the golden buzzer from Trish Stratus.

In the first semi-final on May 2, they performed a routine set to an acoustic cover of Hozier's "Take Me to Church", about their own journey as a dance troupe from a smaller city about halfway between the dominant metropolitan centres of Montreal and Quebec City. They were one of two acts selected by the judges to proceed directly to the finals.

In the finale, they performed a number themed around writer's block, with the dance revolving around a large book. They won the competition over The Cast, another Quebec-based dance troupe from Lévis, in second place.
