= Canada's Got Talent season 2 =

Canada's Got Talent
- Season 2
- Promotional poster for season 2, featuring (L to R) judges Offishall, Stratus, Mandel, Singh, and host Ell
- Hosted by: Lindsay Ell
- Judges: Kardinal Offishall; Trish Stratus; Lilly Singh; Howie Mandel; Jason Priestley (guest); Simon Cowell (guest)
- Winner: Jeanick Fournier
- Runners-up: Kellie Loder; The Renegades
- No. of episodes: 9

Release
- Original network: Citytv
- Original release: March 22 – May 17, 2022

Season chronology
- ← Previous; Season 1 Next → Season 3

The second season of Canada's Got Talent, a reality television series, premiered on March 22, 2022, on Citytv. Unlike America's Got Talent, it has only an audition round, semi-finals and a finale. Jeanick Fournier, a singer from Saguenay, Quebec, won.

== Format ==
=== Auditions ===
The auditions took place in front of the judges and a live audience. At any time during the audition, the judges showed their disapproval of the act by pressing a buzzer, which lights a large red "X" on the stage. If all the judges pressed their buzzers, the act must end. Voting worked on a majority-of-three basis, where three positive votes from the judges were required. The Golden Buzzer is placed in the center of the stage, and each judge (or the host) can only press the Golden Buzzer once each, sending an act straight to the semi-finals.

In the final audition episode before the semi-finals, the dance troupe The Renegades received a special collective golden buzzer from all four judges and Ell. This was only the second time in the history of the franchise in North America that this occurred, following young singer Victory Brinker in the 16th season of America's Got Talent.

=== Semi-finals ===
The semi-finals and final were broadcast through three episodes, two semi-finals and one finale. Judges could still end a performance early with three X's. The acts competed for two judge votes that send them straight to the finals, and the rest compete for a Canada-wide vote that dictates the rest of the finalists. The judges were asked to express their views on each act's performance. Phone lines, Twitter, Facebook, texting and online voting platforms opened for a one-hour after all acts performed. The public voted for the act they thought was the best. Voters could submit a total of fifty votes (ten in each platform). After the votes were counted, the act that polled the highest number of public votes, automatically was placed in the final. The judges then chose between the second and third most popular acts, with the winner of that vote also gaining a place in the final. All other acts were then eliminated from the competition.

=== The Finals ===
The acts who made it through the semifinals have a final shot at performing once again, and all of the acts competed for a Canada-wide vote that determined the winner of the season. This round has been broadcast live, and the winner is revealed at the end of the episode.

== Judges and host ==
Judges for Canada's Got Talent (season 2)

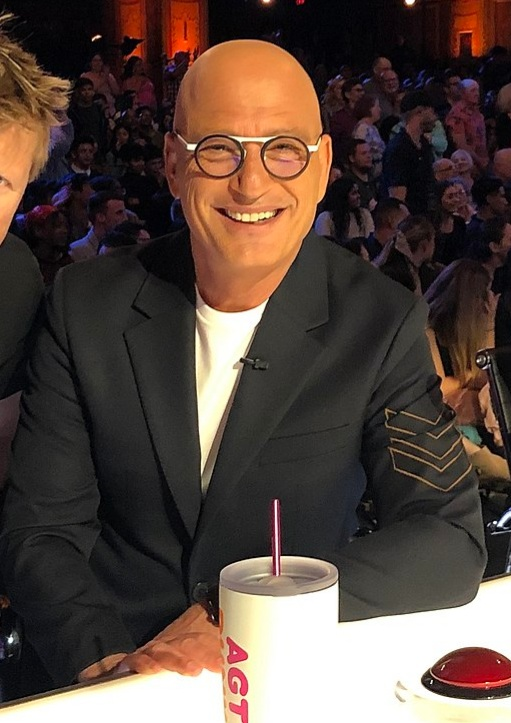
Howie Mandel

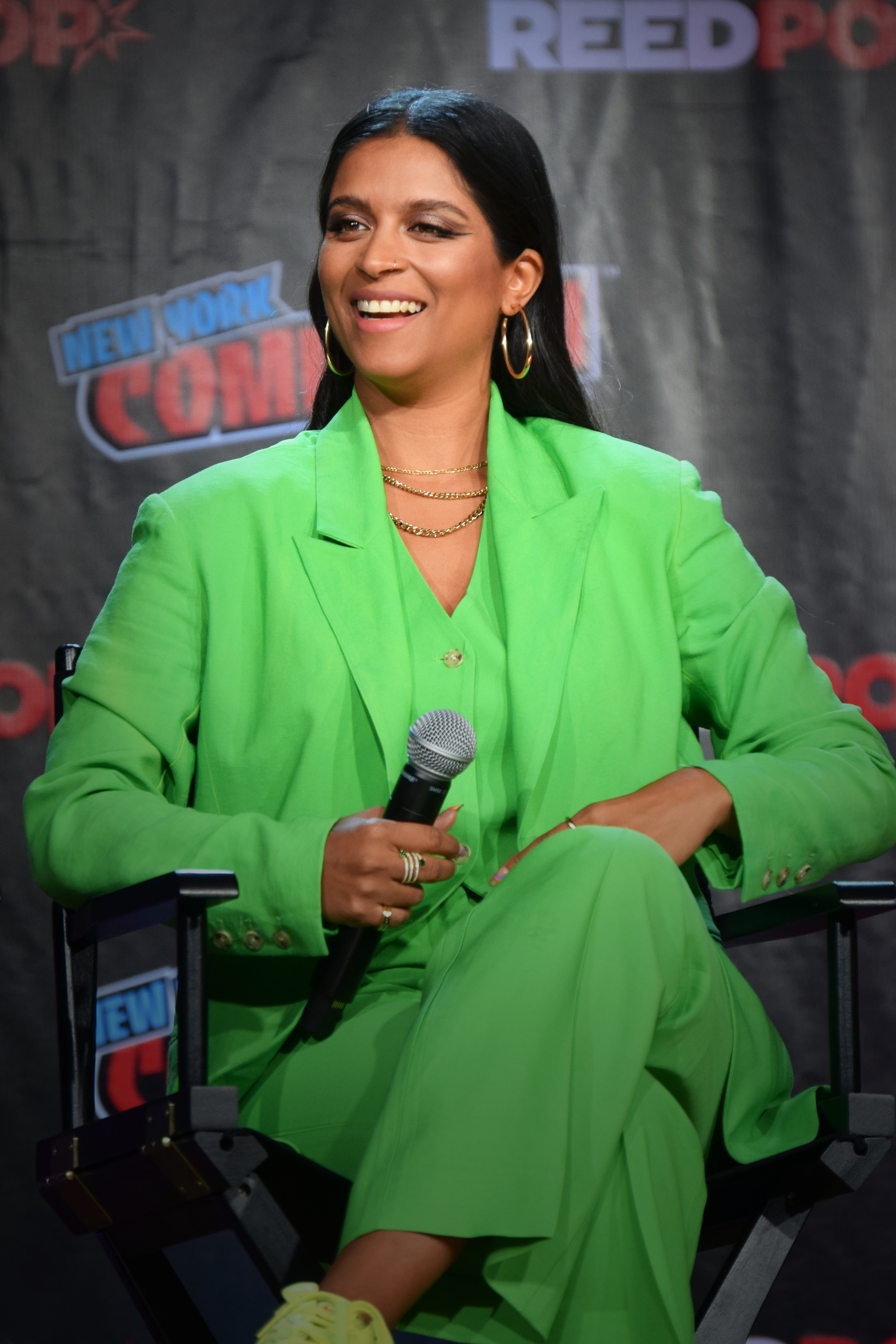
Lilly Singh

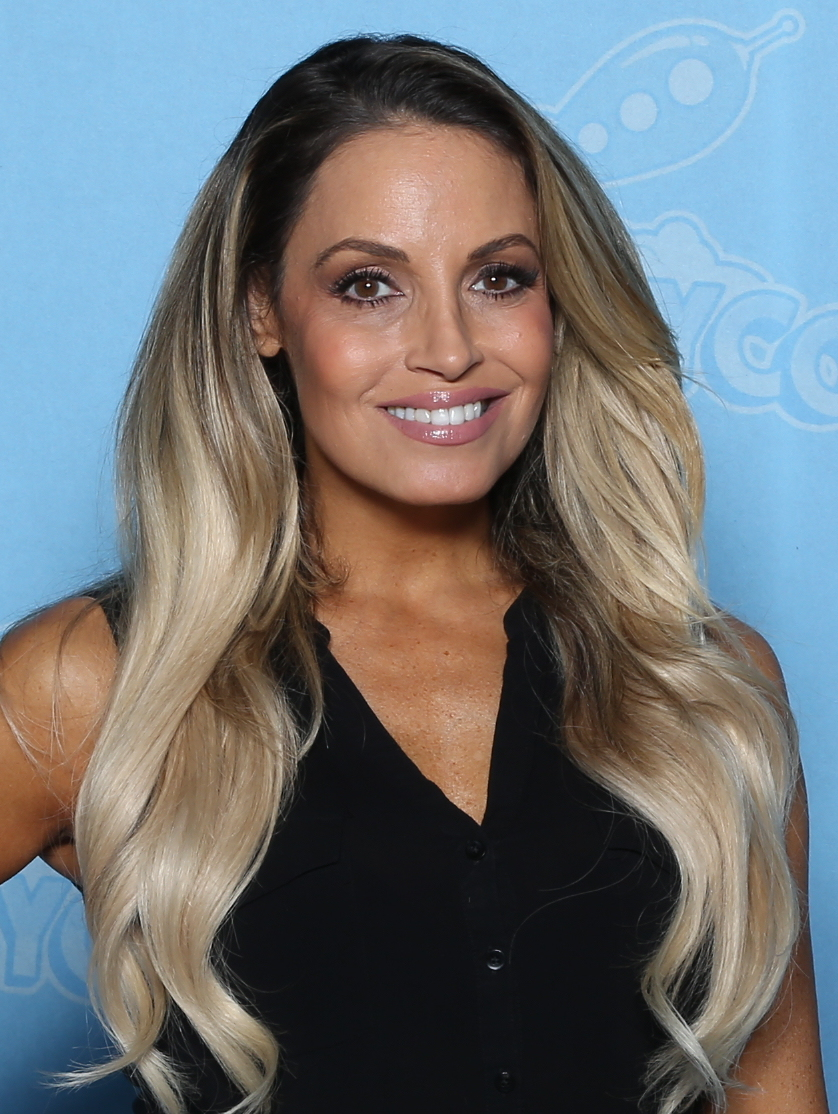
Trish Stratus

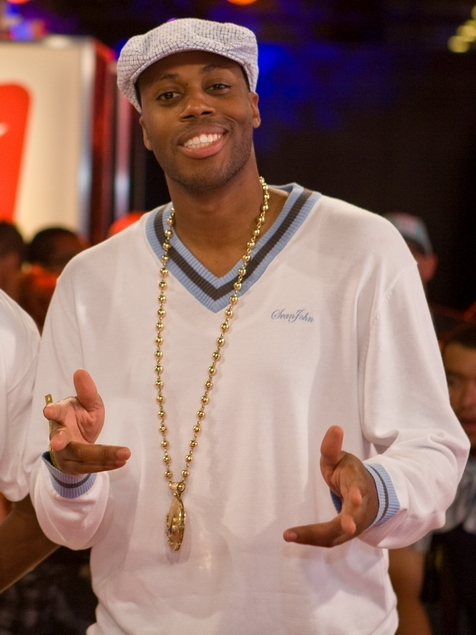
Kardinal Offishall

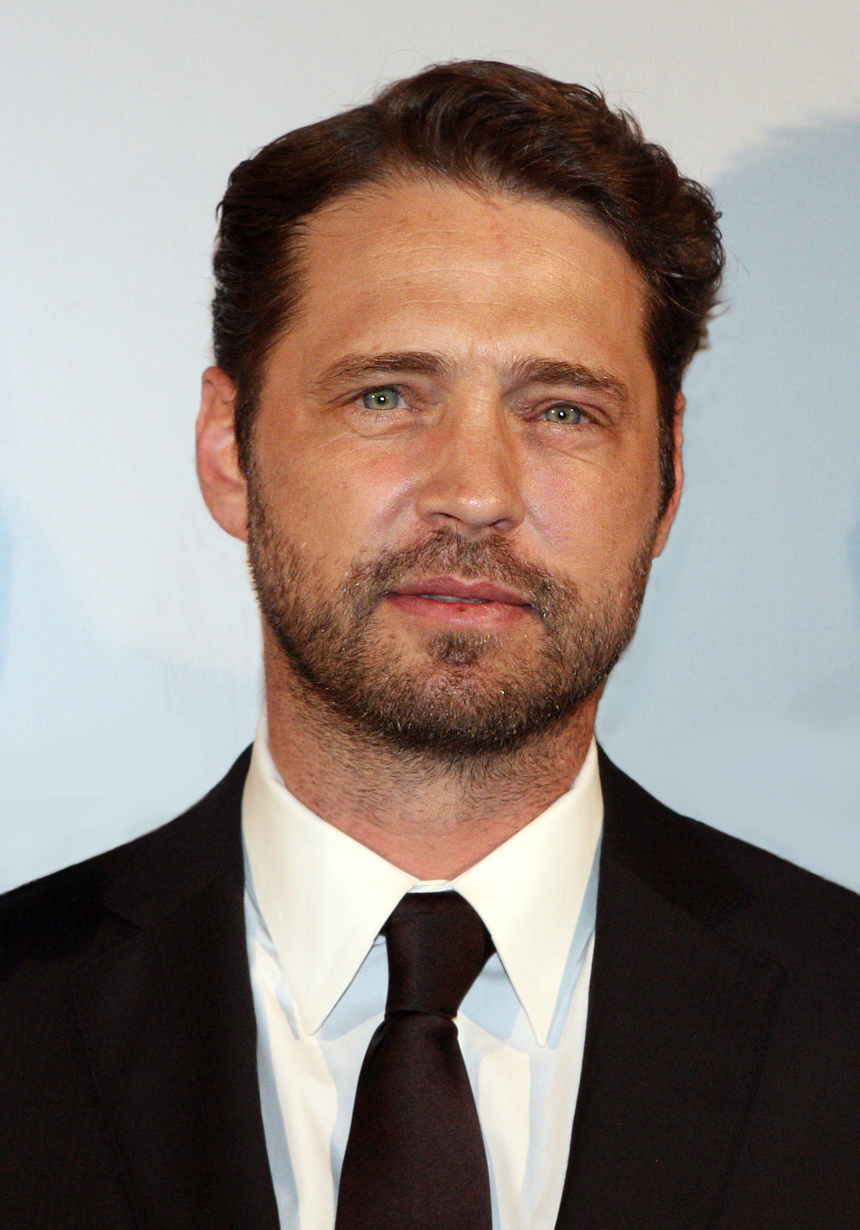
Jason Priestley (Guest)

Simon Cowell (Guest)

It was announced in October 2021 that Kardinal Offishall, Trish Stratus, Lilly Singh and Howie Mandel would serve as judges for the show, with Lindsay Ell as host. The semi-finals later would employ a reduced panel with actor/director Jason Priestley sitting in for both Offishall and Stratus; Stratus reported on her Instagram account that she had contracted COVID-19 the week of the semi-finals taping and thus had to isolate, while Offishall was away for undisclosed reasons.

Simon Cowell, the creator and executive producer of the franchise and a judge in the British and American editions, is not a regular judge of the competition but appeared on the judging panel for the finale.

== Season overview ==
Winner | Runner-up | Third place
Finalist | Semi-finalist | Golden Buzzer (Auditions)

Participant	Genre	Act	From	Semi-Final	Result
Arik Pipestem	Dance	Hoop Dancer	Calgary, AB	1	Eliminated
Canine Circus	Animals	Dog Act	Toronto, ON	2	Eliminated
Chucky Mady	Danger	Stuntman	Windsor, ON	1	Eliminated
Courtney Gilmour	Comedy	Comedian	Toronto, ON	1	Finalist
Esther & Ezekiel	Singing	Vocal Duo	Caledonia, ON	2	Eliminated
GRVMNT	Dance	Dance Group	Vancouver, BC	1	Finalist
Jeanick Fournier	Singing	Singer	Chicoutimi, QC	2	Winner
Kellie Loder	Singing	Singer	St. John's, NL	1	Runner-up
Ola Dada	Comedy	Comedian	Fort McMurray, AB	2	Eliminated
The Renegades	Dance	Dance Group	Toronto, ON	2	Third place
Savio Joseph	Magic	Magician	Brampton, ON	2	Finalist
Sébastien Savard	Music	Violinist	Alma, QC	1	Eliminated
The Sentimentalists	Magic	Mentalist Duo	Toronto, ON	1	Eliminated
Shadow Entertainment	Dance	Dance Group	Mississauga, ON	1	Finalist
Shea	Singing	Singer	Vancouver, BC	1	Eliminated
Stacey Kay	Singing	Singer	Cambridge, ON	2	Finalist
Theo & Mila	Acrobatics	Acrobat Duo	Oakville, ON	2	Eliminated
Trillium Entertainment	Acrobatics	Aerialists	Toronto, ON	2	Eliminated

=== Semi-finals summary ===
Offishall and Stratus were absent for both semi-final episodes, so there were only 3 judges (Priestley, Singh, and Mandel).

Buzzed Out | Advanced (Won the Judges' Vote) | Advanced (Won the Public's Vote)

==== Semi-final 1 (May 3) ====
Guest judge: Jason Priestley

Semi-Finalist	Order	Buzzes			Result
Semi-Finalist	Order	Mandel	Singh	Priestley	Result
GRVMNT	1				Advanced
Sébastien Savard	2				Eliminated
Shea	3				Eliminated
Chucky Mady	4				Eliminated
Arik Pipestem	5				Eliminated
The Sentimentalists	6				Eliminated
Kellie Loder	7				Advanced
Courtney Gilmour	8				Advanced
Shadow Entertainment	9				Advanced

==== Semi-final 2 (May 10) ====
Guest judge: Jason Priestley

Semi-Finalist	Order	Buzzes			Result
Semi-Finalist	Order	Mandel	Singh	Priestley	Result
The Renegades	1				Advanced
Trillium Entertainment	2				Eliminated
Stacey Kay	3				Advanced
Ola Dada	4				Eliminated
Theo & Mila	5				Eliminated
Esther & Ezekiel	6				Eliminated
Savio Joseph	7				Advanced
Canine Circus	8				Eliminated
Jeanick Fournier	9				Advanced

=== Live Finale (May 17) ===
Guest judge: Simon Cowell

Winner | Runner-up | 3rd place | Finalist

Finalist	Result (May 17)
Courtney Gilmour	Finalist
GRVMNT	Finalist
Jeanick Fournier	Winner
Kellie Loder	Runner-up
The Renegades	3rd place
Savio Joseph	Finalist
Shadow Entertainment	Finalist
Stacey Kay	Finalist

== Production ==
The season is filmed in the Avalon Theatre in Fallsview Casino Resort. It is produced by McGillivray Entertainment, Fremantle and Rogers Sports & Media. Sponsors of the program include Tim Hortons, CIBC, Walmart, Activia, and Air Miles.

== Ratings ==
Order	Episode	Viewers (millions)	Rank (night)	Rank (week)
1	"Auditions 1"	0.858	3	28
2	"Auditions 2"	—	—	—
3	"Auditions 3"	—	—	—
4	"Auditions 4"	—	—	—
5	"Auditions 5"	—	—	—
6	"Auditions 6"	0.826	—	30
7	"Semi-final 1"	—	—	—
8	"Semi-final 2"	—	—	—
9	"Live Finale"	0.884	—	21
