= Kellie Loder =

Canadian singer-songwriter

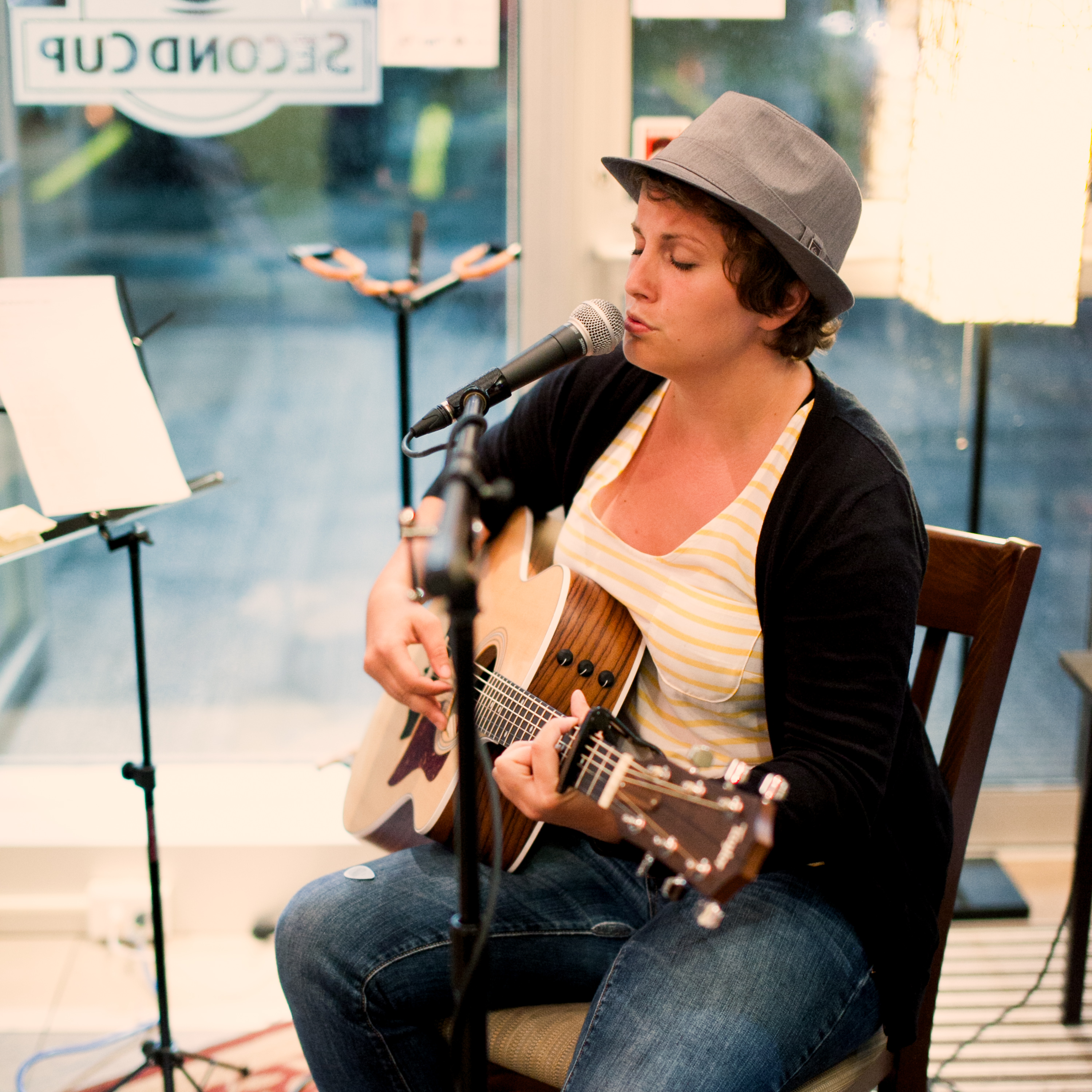
- Kellie Loder at one of two free coffeehouses in Newfoundland in December 2012

Background information
- Born: 1988 (age 37–38)
- Origin: Badger, Newfoundland, Canada
- Genres: Contemporary Christian; Gospel; folk-pop
- Occupations: Singer-songwriter, musician
- Instruments: Drums; guitar; piano; vocals
- Years active: 2009–present
- Website: kellieloder.com

Kellie Loder (born 1988) is an independent singer-songwriter from Newfoundland who plays drums, guitar and piano. They have released three albums: The Way in 2009, Imperfections & Directions in 2010 and Benefit of the Doubt in 2018. With a voice that St. John's-based newspaper The Telegram has described as "powerful yet serene and soulful", they received critical recognition from Canada, including a nomination at the Juno Awards.

Having written their first song at age 16 about a cousin who died in a traffic accident, Loder was studying nursing at the Grenfell Campus of Memorial University of Newfoundland when they released The Way in August 2009. Later that year, Loder won a talent-search contest hosted by YC Newfoundland, a Christian youth conference. As part of the award, Loder was given time with music industry and production professionals who helped them with Imperfections & Directions, which was released at the 2010 YC Newfoundland. The album was nominated for Contemporary Christian/Gospel Album of the Year at the 2012 Juno Awards. Loder is also a nominee of three MusicNL awards, including Gospel Artist of the Year in 2011.

Loder's music career is unusual in that they chose to begin it in Contemporary Christian music (CCM); most young musicians choose music genres such as country and pop, which are generally considered more likely to bring commercial success. Loder has asserted that they chose CCM because it gives purpose to their music; however, they later shifted their focus toward mainstream pop and rock music, stating that they still write music from a spiritual perspective but want to be accessible to a wider audience.

Loder uses gender neutral pronouns.

== Early life ==
Kellie Loder was born to Christina and Bob Loder in 1988, and was raised in Badger, a town in the Canadian province of Newfoundland and Labrador. They consider their first introduction to music to have taken place before they were born; their mother frequently played Michael W. Smith songs through headphones while they were still in the womb. Loder claims to have "natural rhythm" and that they began emulating the drummer at their Pentecostal church by beating on a pew with pencils at the age of two. At age 10, Loder was placed in their church's drumming ensemble.

Loder's younger brother taught them three guitar chords when they were 14, and they received their first guitar later that year. They began writing songs at age 16. Their first song, which was about a cousin who had died in a traffic accident, used lyrics from a poem by one of their mutual friends. With encouragement from family, Loder concentrated on singing and songwriting, and performed this in addition to another song they subsequently wrote for a friend's graduation.

Loder was raised as a Christian by their parents, and became serious about their faith in 2007, when they "started to accept [their] gifts for what they were... and just assumed it was [from] God." After this experience, Loder began playing piano, and credited God with teaching them how to play. Loder favours the piano, considering it the most beautiful of the instruments they play. The first song they wrote after beginning the piano was "Giants", also for a graduating class; the song uses the story of Goliath as its theme, generalizing the story to apply to each individual's internal struggles. "Giants" eventually appeared on both The Way and Imperfections & Directions.

== Music career ==
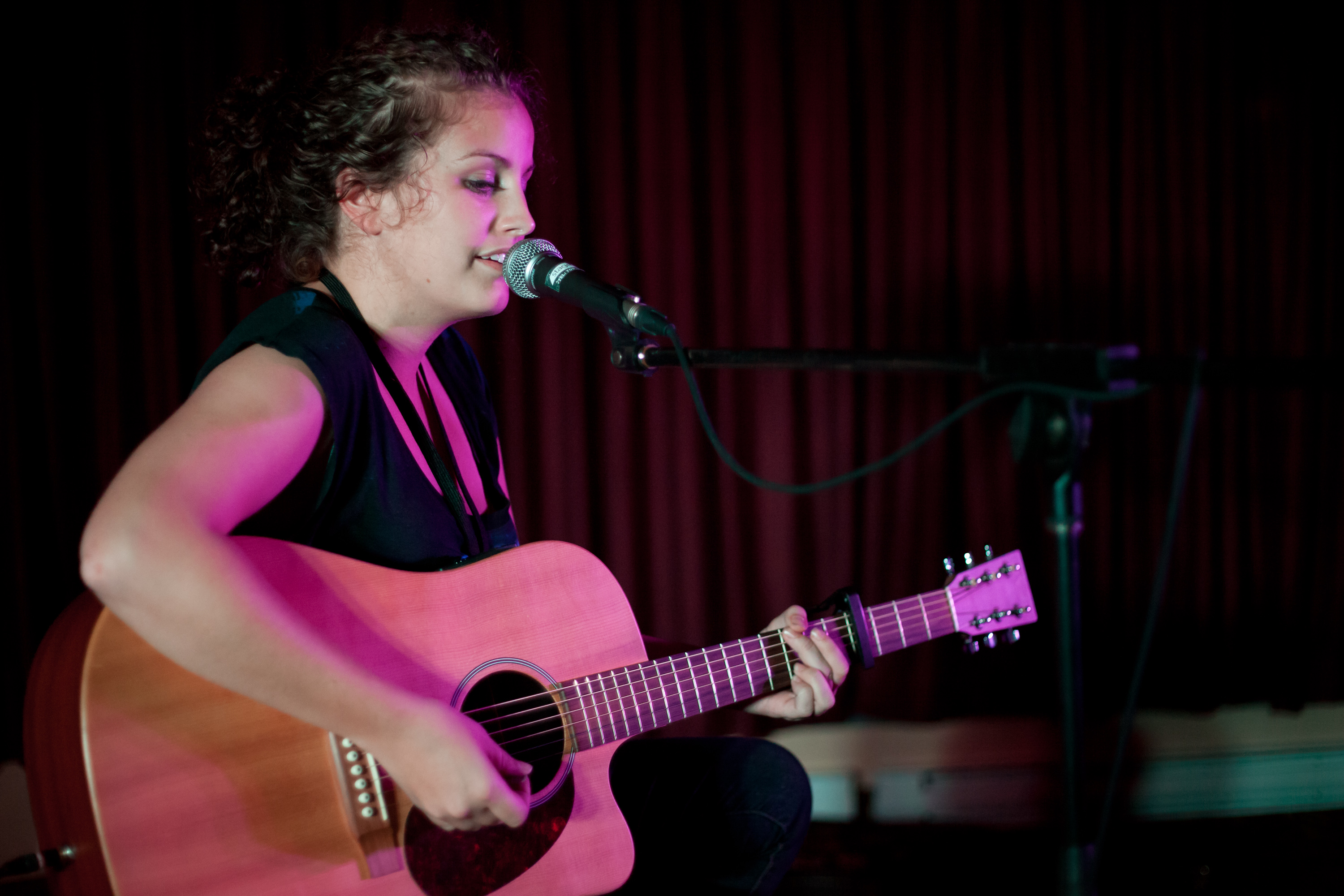
Loder won a talent-search contest hosted by YC Newfoundland in 2009, and their prize package included a featured performance slot at the following year's conference.

=== 2008–2012 ===
In 2008, while studying nursing at the Grenfell Campus of Memorial University of Newfoundland through the Western Regional School of Nursing, Loder met Devin Robinson, a record producer. The meeting led to him producing Loder's first album, an independent release called The Way, which was recorded at Sweet Music Studios. Loder wrote all 11 songs on the album, which was released in August 2009. The initial run of the album sold out, and Loder subsequently went door-to-door in small Newfoundland communities selling a second run of the album. On their most lucrative day selling albums in this manner, they made $1,000. Loder later said that this manner of selling the album proved to be a good way to develop a fanbase; people invited them into their homes for meals, prayer, and discussions. Also that year, they won a talent-search contest hosted by YC Newfoundland, a Christian youth conference, where they performed "Giants".

As part of the award, which was valued at C$20,000, Loder was given a membership for both the East Coast Music and MusicNL trade associations, and was given time at a recording studio and advice from the music industry and production professionals. They also engaged in a featured performance slot at the following year's YC Newfoundland. Loder later referred to the music professionals they met (including Scott Mansfield, Mark Peddle, and NewManiac Studios' Peter Newman) as "the top players" in the music industry of Newfoundland and Labrador, and the producers helped Loder with Imperfections & Directions, their second album. They were particularly appreciative of Newman, who produced the album, mixing Imperfections & Directions with Tom Laune in Nashville, Tennessee. Loder originally conceived "Fearless" (one of the album's tracks) as a techno song, and believes that Newman was the one who made that techno feel a reality.

On November 14, 2009, Loder opened for the Newfoundland-based Christian rock band Anyday, which was launching its debut album, Got Extraordinary, at a benefit concert at Springdale's Indian River High School. This concert, which was Loder's first performance in Springdale and their first time performing with Anyday, raised $675 to support David Willis and his family in Willis's battle with lymphoma at Daffodil House in St. John's, with more than 100 people in attendance. Loder and Anyday were scheduled to perform together again on November 28 at Dorset Collegiate on Pilley's Island.

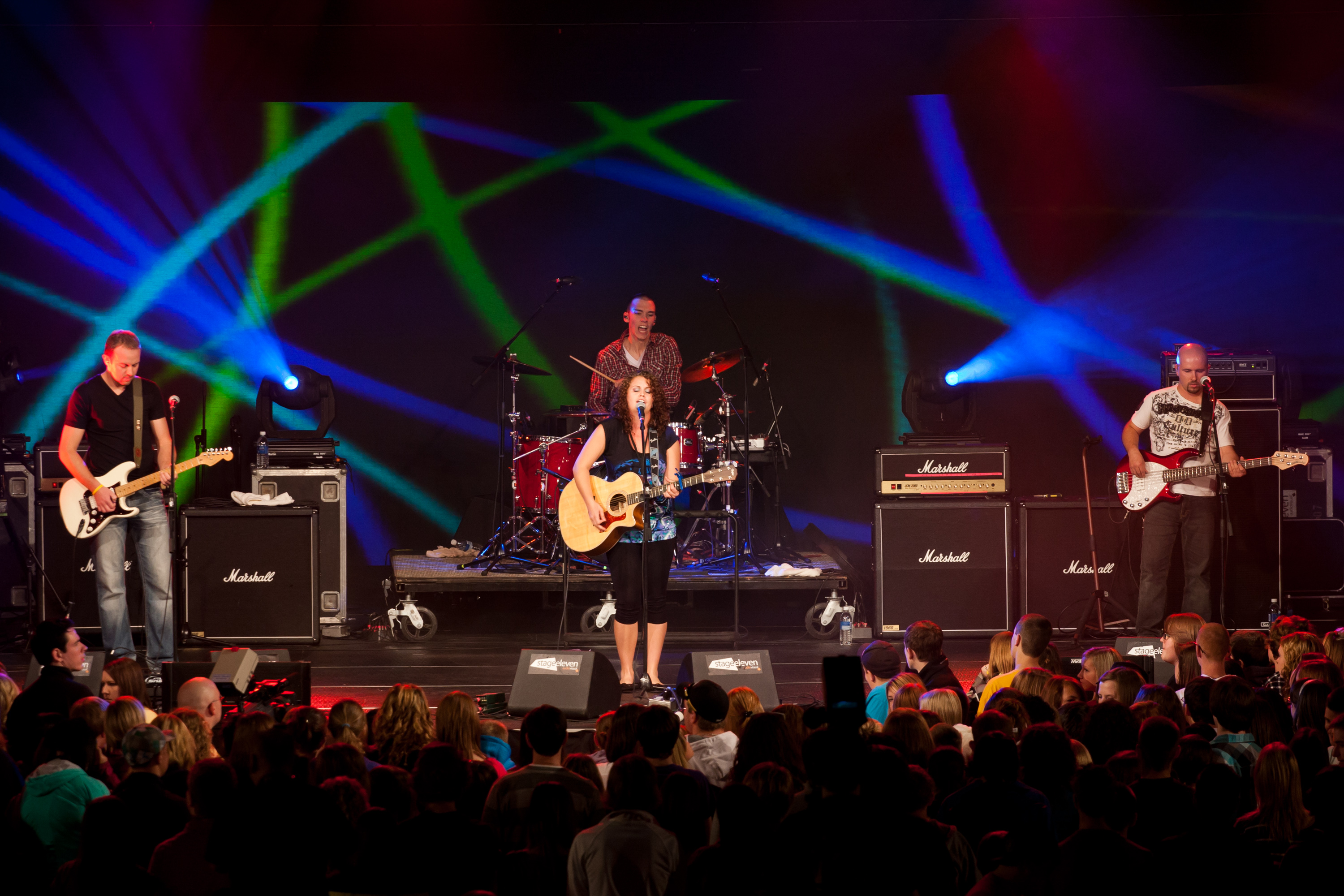
Loder officially released Imperfections & Directions, their second album, at the 2010 YC Newfoundland (pictured).

Loder moved to St. John's in January 2010, and performed alongside Starfield and Roy Martin later that year at the Exploits Valley Salmon Festival gospel concert in Grand Falls-Windsor. They also performed at the 2010 One Worship Festival in Springdale, and officially released Imperfections & Directions, another independent release, at YC Newfoundland that October. Loder's nursing studies hampered their ability to showcase this album by touring. A reporter for The Telegram newspaper wrote that Imperfections & Directions "demonstrates how Loder wears [their] faith and love of God on [their] sleeve." Loder was nominated as Female Artist of the Year at the 2010 MusicNL awards with Mary Barry; Teresa Ennis; Irene Bridger; and Amelia Curran, the eventual winner. Loder was nominated for another MusicNL award the following year, this time in the Gospel Artist of the Year category; this nomination was, in part, due to Imperfections & Directions.

In early 2012, Loder made a music video for "Your Love Alone", one of the album's tracks, which was uploaded to YouTube. They later said they had written the song during a difficult phase in their life, and the song's lyrics revolve around the idea that the grace and mercy of God can be found in the most difficult situations. Through their experience, they became convinced that knowing God is all-important, expressing this concept in the chorus: "Your love alone is sufficient. It needs no company." They stated that they wrote the song "One Name Away" after having watched The Tyra Banks Show. The episode featured an interview with a girl who had been forced into prostitution at a young age; despite smiling on screen, the girl hopelessly declared that she would probably die before she turned 22.

Imperfections & Directions was nominated as Contemporary Christian/Gospel Album of the Year at the 2012 Juno Awards, Canada's top music awards. Loder said the nomination was a surprise; they learned about it in a text message from Newman after missing a call from him. Their fellow nominees in the Contemporary Christian/Gospel Album category were Jon Bauer's Forevermore, downhere's On the Altar of Love, Sky Terminal's Don't Close Your Eyes and Hawk Nelson's Crazy Love. Loder travelled to Ottawa, Ontario on March 28 to attend the awards ceremony, hosted by William Shatner at Scotiabank Place on April 1. Their album was one of three Newfoundland nominees at the Juno Awards that year; the other two were rock band Hey Rosetta! and The Once's folk album, Row Upon Row of the People We Know. Loder said that "on a scale of 1 to 10", their excitement about the Juno nomination was "probably a 10."

Although Loder lost the Juno Award to downhere, an alternative rock band, they said they enjoyed walking down the red carpet and would never forget meeting major Canadian musicians such as Blue Rodeo and Sam Roberts; Loder had an opportunity to sing and play guitar with Blue Rodeo's Jim Cuddy at the Junos. Loder competed in the 2012 Juno Cup hockey game, in which, at 5 feet 4 inches (1.63 m), they were considerably shorter than most of the other players. Playing for the Rockers team of Juno nominees against the Greats team of former National Hockey League players, they were awarded a penalty shot after a fight with Troy Crowder. The Greats threw their sticks in Loder's way as Loder took the shot, which was stopped with ease by goaltender David Francey, a Juno nominee who had been traded to the Greats. Loder returned to Newfoundland on April 2; the following month, they performed at Gros Morne National Park's Trails, Tails & Tunes Festival with Dave Paddon. In that July, Loder performed alongside Nick Hamlyn at Corner Brook's Downtown Days festival.

=== 2013–present ===
Over the subsequent months into the middle of 2013, Loder performed on a monthly basis at the Stavanger Drive Second Cup, which is owned by Newman. They also performed at the Majestic Theatre and the Fat Cat Blues Bar in St. John's. In 2013, they were named a showcase winner by the Christian Women in Media Association (CWIMA) and were selected to perform at the organization's national conference. Loder performed six songs live as part of an interview on CBC Radio in April 2013. They had written five of these songs, and four of them had not been previously released. The unreleased songs were "Playground", "Nursing a Broken Heart", "Like a Flower", and "One Girl", and the fourth song was "On This Drive", which had appeared on Imperfections & Directions. The fifth song was a cover version of Johnny Cash's "Folsom Prison Blues". They were inspired to write the song "Nursing a Broken Heart" after watching George Stroumboulopoulos Tonight, on which Hugh Jackman uttered the phrase "nursing a broken heart" as part of an interview. They wrote "Like a Flower" after a friend challenged them to write a song directed at themself as a child.

Listeners unfamiliar with contemporary Christian music (CCM) often assume that Loder sings hymn-style music. Their career is unusual in that it began in CCM; most young musicians choose music genres such as country and pop, which are generally considered more likely to bring commercial success. Loder has asserted that they chose CCM because it gives purpose to their music; many of their songs are about God, but they may also be interpreted as being about other subjects. In 2013, Loder said that they were starting to write and perform songs in other genres, and hoped that they would be able to transition out of CCM as Katy Perry, Lifehouse, and Creed had done previously. In transitioning out of CCM, they wished to assure the public that they had "definitely not turned [their] back on [their] faith."

Loder believes everything that they sing is for God, regardless of the song's subject. They see their music as a Christian ministry, the goal of which is to inspire people to live happier, better lives. A reporter for The Telegram called Loder's voice "powerful yet serene and soulful". Their songs have been played regularly on Rogers TV and CBC Radio. Specifically, their song "Raise You Higher" was selected for several song countdowns and was played across Canada by both secular and Christian radio stations. A CBC Radio reviewer called Loder "amazingly talented", their music "gorgeous" and their song "Playground" in particular "absolutely beautiful". In 2012, Loder worked as a Child and Youth Worker at a company called Blue Sky. In April, they were undecided on a career in music or medicine, but later confirmed that music was their focus, and was considering a move to Toronto for more career opportunities.

In 2015, Loder took part in Bell Media's songwriting challenge, a two-day workshop in Newfoundland for songwriters to showcase their new work. They called the experience "life-changing", and it gave them the opportunity to work with producer Justin Gray, a collaborator of Mariah Carey, John Legend, among others. After two years in production, Loder released the album Benefit of the Doubt in 2018. The album is a combination of folk and pop, and marks an effort to appeal to a mainstream audience; Loder co-produced 10 of the original tracks. "I still write music that's spiritual, I just want it to be more relatable to everybody," they said. Two of the album's tracks, "Molded Like a Monster" and "Boxes", had music videos. They said that the inspiration for "Molded Like a Monster" came from their own family's strict Christian views, where they had to hide their sexuality from other church peers but "felt guilty a lot of the time for just doing what made me happy". At the MusicNL awards, Loder received two nominations for the album: Female Artist of the Year, and Music Video of the Year (for "Boxes").

In January 2019, Loder released the single "Fearless"; the song was positively received and used in an IMAX trailer for Superpower Dogs, a documentary narrated by Chris Evans. In October of that year, they performed "Fearless" at The East Coast Music Hour, a series of concerts inspired by the themes of courage, transformation and longing. They also appeared twice on CBC's Parkway Sessions, performing "Falling Out of Love" and "Hate Loves Hate". In 2020, Loder was due to accompany Joel Plaskett's music tour, but it was rescheduled due to the COVID-19 pandemic. During the summer, they recorded new music including a song called "Afterglow". Throughout the same year, Loder hosted virtual songwriting events on Facebook to connect with fans.

In 2022, Loder auditioned for season 2 of Canada's Got Talent. Their performance was shown in the fourth episode of the season. Kardinal called Loder a "megastar" after their authenticity shone through in their unique rendition of "To Make You Feel My Love". All four judges said yes and they advanced to the next round, and eventually making it to the finale. Loder placed second in the competition, behind winner Jeanick Fournier.

Loder won two East Coast Music Awards in 2023, for Songwriter of the Year and Fan's Choice Entertainer of the Year. In the same year, Loder released a cover of "Sonny's Dream" on the Ron Hynes tribute album Sonny Don't Go Away.

== Discography ==
Year	Title	Ref.
2009	The Way	
2010	Imperfections & Directions	
2018	Benefit of the Doubt	
2024	Transitions	

== Awards and nominations ==
Year	Organisation	Award	Result	Ref.
2009	YC Newfoundland	Talent Search Contest	Won	
2010	MusicNL	Female Artist of the Year	Nominated	
2011	MusicNL	Gospel Artist of the Year	Nominated	
2017	MusicNL	Music Video of the Year ("Boxes")	Nominated	
2018	MusicNL	Female Artist of the Year	Nominated	
2012	Juno Awards	Contemporary Christian/Gospel Album of the Year	Nominated	
2013	CWIMA National Conference	National Musical Showcase	Won	
2018	Canadian Folk Music Awards	Contemporary Singer of the Year	Nominated	
