= Claude Watson School for the Arts =

Specialized arts school in Toronto, Canada

Claud Watson School for the Arts

Location
- 130 Doris Avenue; Toronto, Ontario; Canada

Information
- Type: Specialized arts school
- Motto: Arts, Hearts, and Minds Home of the Phoenix Positively Higher
- School board: Toronto District School Board
- Superintendent: Ainsworth Morgan
- Principal: Thane Jovanovich
- Grades: 4-8
- Enrollment: 300 (2006)
- Newspaper: The Daily Raccoon
- Website: www.claudewatson.org

The Claude Watson School for the Arts (CWSA) is a public arts school for grades 4–8 in Toronto, Ontario, Canada.

== History ==
The Claude Watson School for the Arts was founded in 1981 after the North York Board of Education proposed a school with a program for artistically gifted individuals in February 1980. Neil P. Johnston was the school's first principal. When the CWSA was opened, it had a capacity of 175 students.

In 1998, a proposition by Bramalea Ltd. to redevelop the CWSA Spring Garden campus into high-rises with a school in their midst was rejected by the school's trustees. In 2003, the Toronto District School Board (TDSB) sold approximately half of the school's 1.6 hectare campus to private buyers with the intention of utilizing the funds for improvements to the school.

In October 2017, the Toronto District School Board proposed ending specialty schools in Toronto, including the Claude Watson School for the Arts. The motion was retracted within a month of the initial proposal.

== Admissions ==
The Claude Watson School for the Arts used to use an audition process to select its students. Following a school trustee vote in 2022, the process has been changed to use interest-based applications instead of an ability-based process. If program demand exceeds capacity, a lottery process will then be used. The admission process change affected all specialized high schools in the TDSB, not just Claude Watson. The TDSB said the change would help address barriers to access and ensure equal opportunity. Some parents and students critiqued the change, fearing it would be unfair to talented students who had worked hard on their auditions and artistic practices. As of 2026, the process for selecting students was changed back to the audition process, following a 2025 reversion in TDSB policy back to the merit-based system.

== Academics ==
Students at the Claude Watson School for the Arts spend half of their day learning traditional school subjects and the other half participating in specialized arts learning. CWSA offers arts programming in four subject areas: music, dance, drama and visual arts. The dance department at CWSA was founded by Maxine Heppner. CWSA uses a school day extended by 15 minutes to allow for specialized arts training while meeting provincial curriculum requirements.

As of 2006, CWSA has a maximum of 300 students.

== Architecture ==
=== Spring Garden location ===
The former campus of the Claude Watson School for the Arts was located northeast of Yonge Street and Sheppard Avenue on Spring Garden Avenue.

=== Doris Avenue location ===
The current campus of the Claude Watson School for the Arts is located at 130 Doris Avenue in Toronto's northern precinct. The Doris Avenue CWSA building was completed in 2007 and designed by Kohn Shnier Architects. The building has a cantilevered library that sits overtop an outdoor amphitheatre and a brise-soleil with hexagonal patterning. The Doris Avenue campus has LEED Silver certification.

== Claude Watson Secondary Arts Program ==
The Claude Watson School for the Arts is affiliated with the Claude Watson Secondary Arts Program for high school students run out of the Earl Haig Secondary School. Students graduating from CWSA are not guaranteed entry into the Secondary Arts Program and must audition.

== Notable alumni ==
- Ariel Garten, artist and scientist
- Sarah Gadon, actress
- Scott Helman, singer-songwriter
- Tommy Paxton-Beesly, songwriter and musician who performs as River Tiber
- Rachel Skarsten, actress
