= Sagkeeng's Finest =

- Origin: Fort Alexander, Manitoba, Canada
- Years active: 2011–?
- Members: Brandon Courchene; Dallas Courchene; Vince O'Laney
- Website: www.sagkeengsfinest.ca

Sagkeeng's Finest is an Indigenous Canadian dance troupe that won the first season of Canada's Got Talent in 2012. The trio consists of Brandon Courchene (born 1993 or 1994), Dallas Courchene (born 1995 or 1996), and Vince O'Laney (born 1994), three teenagers from the Sagkeeng First Nation in Manitoba, who perform a blend of traditional Métis jigging with contemporary dance. In their winning performance, the trio danced to a medley of Raghav's "Fire" and Metro Station's "Shake It". The group later disbanded.

In June 2013, two of the members were arrested by the Royal Canadian Mounted Police for speeding. When the police searched the car, they found 15 grams of cannabis. The police also found brass knuckles. O'Laney was charged with possession of a controlled substance and possession of a prohibited weapon, while Brandon Courchene was charged with possession of a controlled substance. They later apologized to fans in a Facebook post.
