= Mysterion the Mind Reader =

Canadian mentalist, magician, and writer

Mysterion
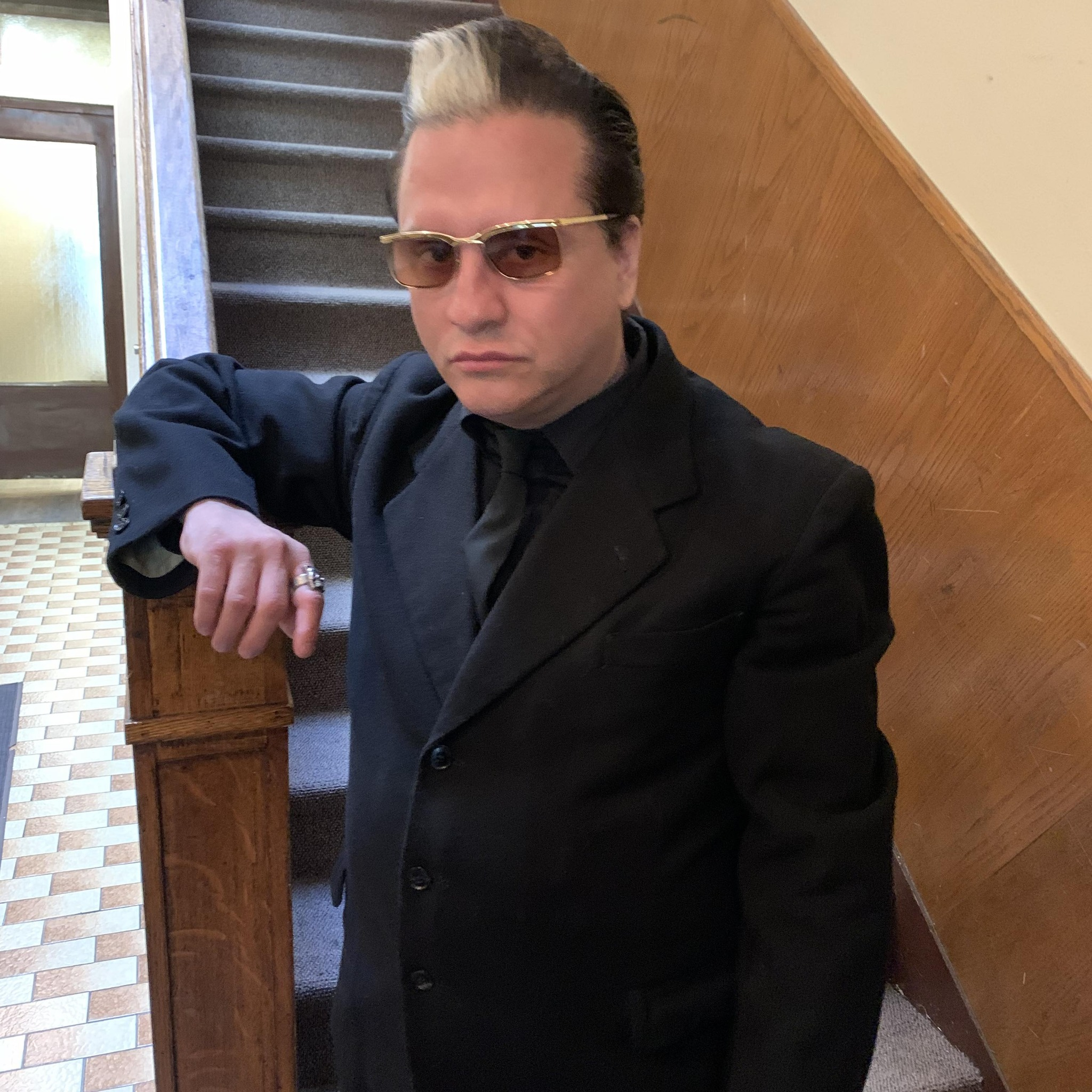
- Born: Christopher Justin Doyle; October 31, 1974 (age 51); Toronto, Ontario, Canada
- Occupations: Magician and wrestling manager
- Years active: 2002–present
- Website: mysterionthemindreader.com

Christopher Justin Doyle (born October 31, 1974), professionally known as Mysterion the Mind Reader, is a Canadian mentalist, magician, collector and corporate mentalist. He is one half of the mentalist duo 'The Sentimentalists' and currently performs a solo mentalism show.

== Career ==
Native to Toronto he appears on various television programs and media and is known for his award winning mentalism. (Metro, Toronto Star, Bizarre Magazine, PIE magazine, and 24hrs). He has appeared numerous times on MUCHMUSIC and many morning shows (CP24, Breakfast television, Mancow Chicago CHCH, and Global Morning Live). Mysterion is a collector of rare artwork and antiques from around the world. From 2013-2017 Mysterion appeared regularly on Rogers TV Wrestling program Victory Wrestling showcase and live wrestling events as a manager and occasional wrestler.

In 2015 he teamed up with mentalist Steffi Kay to form The Sentimentalists. The Sentimentalists have toured the United States and appeared at the Magic Castle as well as the CIA club in Hollywood. In 2016 they were the subject of a BellFibe1 TV documentary "Something Strange". In Nov 2016 Mysterion and Steffi filmed the TV show Billy Goes North, season 1 episode 10 (Magic Mayhem).

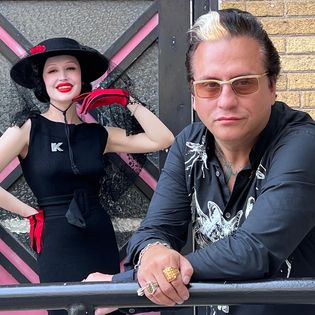
Steff Kay and Mysterion, The Sentimentalists

In May 2018, Mysterion appeared on the show Penn & Teller: Fool Us as part of a mind-reading duo The Sentimentalists with Steffi Kay where they successfully fooled the hosts.

In 2019, Mysterion and Steffi Kay appeared together as The Sentimentalists, as contestants on the fourteenth season of America's Got Talent.

In Feb 2020 they appeared on the cover of magic magazine VANISH. In May 2020 The Sentimentalists were awarded the Allan Slaight award for outstanding achievement in magic: Rising Star. In January 2022 they appeared on the cover and were the feature of Magicseen Magazine.

The Sentimentalists appeared on season two of Canada's Got Talent and advanced to the Semifinals of the competition.

Mysterion has appeared regularly on CHCH morning live with host Emily Vulkovick.

Mysterion appeared as “The Secret” on season two of Canadas Got Talent. In January 2026 Mysterion appeared on the cover of Vanish magic magazine.

He is currently performing primarily corporate events for clients such as Amazon, Google and Microsoft.
