= Canada's Got Talent =

Televised talent show competition

- Logo of the revival series, used since 2022
- Created by: Simon Cowell
- Directed by: Joan Tosoni; Sue Brophey; Harbinder Singh; Dave Russell
- Presented by: Dina Pugliese; Lindsay Ell
- Judges: Stephan Moccio; Measha Brueggergosman; Martin Short; Howie Mandel; Lilly Singh; Kardinal Offishall; Trish Stratus; Katherine Ryan; Shania Twain
- Country of origin: Canada
- Original language: English
- No. of seasons: 5
- No. of episodes: 58

Production
- Executive producers: John Brunton; Barbara Bowlby; Mike Bickerton; Angela Jennings; Scott McGillivray; Michela Di Mondo; Nataline Rodrigues; Claire Adams; Nanci MacLean
- Producers: Mark Lysakowski; Paul Becker; Trevor Boris; Cliff Dempster; Jenny Heap; Amy Regan; Amy Blythe-McCuaig; Andre Williamson; Simon Lynch
- Running time: 30–120 minutes
- Production companies: SYCOtv; FremantleMedia; Insight Productions; Talkback Thames; McGillivray Entertainment; Rogers Sports & Media

Original release
- Network: Citytv
- Release: March 4, 2012 – May 13, 2025

Related
- America's Got Talent; Britain's Got Talent

Canada's Got Talent (often abbreviated as CGT) is a Canadian talent show competition, which debuted on the Citytv network on March 4, 2012. It is part of the global Got Talent franchise.

As with other series in the franchise, the show is a competition in which entertainers in various fields compete to win a prize. In the first season, the winner won a prize of $100,000 and a Nissan GT-R, an opportunity to perform during Citytv's New Year's Eve bash, a possibility to perform in a venue in Las Vegas and a trip to Trinidad and Tobago. In the second and third seasons, the winner received a cash prize of $150,000. In the third season finale, it was announced that the cash prize would be increased to $1 million for the fourth season.

The first season was won by the Manitoba-based dance troupe Sagkeeng's Finest. Citytv brought back Canada's Got Talent for a second season in 2022, ten years after the first season. In October 2021, Citytv announced that Lindsay Ell would host, along with Howie Mandel, Lilly Singh, Kardinal Offishall, and Trish Stratus serving as judges. The season premiered in March 2022, and ended in May. It was won by Quebec singer Jeanick Fournier. A third and fourth season premiered in March 2023 and 2024, and were won by Quebec dance troupe Conversion and Saskatchewan singer Rebecca Strong, respectively. The most recent season, in 2025, was won by Newfoundland and Labrador singer Jacob Lewis.

== Format ==
=== Auditions ===
The auditions took place in front of the judges, and a live audience at different cities across Canada. At any time during the audition, the judges would show their disapproval of the act by pressing a buzzer, which lights a large red "X" on the stage. If all the judges pressed their buzzers, the act must end. Voting worked on a majority-of-two basis, where two positive votes from the judges were required.

=== The Cutdown ===
In the first season, acts that were accepted past the audition moved on to the Judges Round (also known as "The Cutdown"). This stage of the competition did not feature any audiences, and only contained contestants performing in front of the judges. Out of all the acts that made it to this point, thirty-six made it through to the next round, which was the semi-finals. In the second season, this part of the show was removed.

=== Semi-finals/The Eliminations ===
The semi-finals and final were broadcast with a varying number of semi-finals, followed by the one final split into two episodes over one night. The remaining acts performed across a number of semi-finals, with the two most popular acts from each semi-final winning a position in the final. Judges could still end a performance early with three X's. The judges were asked to express their views on each act's performance. Phone lines, Twitter, Facebook, texting and online voting platforms opened for a one hour after all acts performed. The public voted for the act they thought were the best. Voters could submit a total of fifty votes (ten in each platform). After the votes were counted, the act that polled the highest number of public votes, was automatically placed in the final. The judges then chose between the second and third most popular acts, with the winner of that vote also gaining a place in the final. All other acts were then eliminated from the competition. Starting with the fourth season, the semifinals has been rebranded as the Eliminations, which is broadcast for one episode, followed by one grand finale. The remaining acts competed for three judge votes that sent them straight to the finals, and the rest competed for a Canada-wide vote that dictated the rest of the finalists.

=== The Finals ===
The acts who made it past the semifinals/the Eliminations have a final shot at performing once again, and all of the acts competed for a Canada-wide vote that determined the winner of the season. This round has been broadcast live, and the winner is revealed at the end of the episode.

== Judges and hosts ==
Season	Host	Judges (in order of first appearance)			
1	Dina Pugliese	Stephan Moccio	Measha Brueggergosman	Martin Short	—N/a
2	Lindsay Ell	Kardinal Offishall	Trish Stratus	Lilly Singh	Howie Mandel
3	Lindsay Ell	Kardinal Offishall	Trish Stratus	Lilly Singh	Howie Mandel
4	Lindsay Ell	Kardinal Offishall	Trish Stratus	Lilly Singh	Howie Mandel
5	Lindsay Ell	Kardinal Offishall	Katherine Ryan	Shania Twain	Howie Mandel

Canadian comedian and actor, Martin Short, was announced as the first judge on October 13, 2011. On October 17, opera singer Measha Brueggergosman and musician/composer Stephan Moccio, were announced as the two judges to join Short. Citytv Toronto personality and Breakfast Television host, Dina Pugliese, was the host of the show.

In October 2021, it was announced that Howie Mandel, Lilly Singh, Kardinal Offishall and Trish Stratus would serve as judges for the show, with Lindsay Ell as host.

In June 2024, it was announced that Shania Twain and Katherine Ryan would become judges for the fifth season, replacing Singh and Stratus.

== Series overview ==
Season	Episodes	Originally released		Winners	Runners-up
Season	Episodes	First released	Last released	Winners	Runners-up
1	22	March 4, 2012	May 14, 2012	Sagkeeng's Finest	Angry Candy / Freshh
2	9	March 22, 2022	May 17, 2022	Jeanick Fournier	Kellie Loder / The Renegades
3	9	March 21, 2023	May 16, 2023	Conversion	The Cast / The Turnbull Brothers
4	9	March 19, 2024	May 14, 2024	Rebecca Strong	Funkanometry / Eshan Sobti
5	9	March 18, 2025	May 13, 2025	Jacob Lewis	The Martin Boys

=== Season 1 (2012) ===
The first season of Canada's Got Talent aired on Citytv across Canada (and on other TV stations across the country, where there is no Citytv station), starting on March 4, 2012.

Preliminary auditions for the first season of Canada's Got Talent took place during fall 2011, and continued into January 2012. Auditions for the show took place in Winnipeg, Calgary, Vancouver, Montreal, Toronto and Halifax.

Acts chosen to perform in front of the host, judges and a live audience were invited back, starting in Calgary on October 18 and 19. The production tour then went to each of the original cities in October, November, December 2011 and January 2012. Those chosen by the panel of judges went to Toronto for the next rounds, and completed with audience voting, in April and May 2012.

Sagkeeng's Finest received the most votes from Canada, winning the first season of Canada's Got Talent.

==== Hiatus ====
In June 2012, Rogers Media president Scott Moore announced that a second season would not be produced, after a "careful consideration of all factors, including the current economic climate".

A Canadian Family's Got Talent competition was held on Citytv's morning show Breakfast Television in 2020, in acknowledgement of COVID-19 pandemic lockdowns across the country, and to cross-promote season 15 of America's Got Talent on Citytv. Simon Cowell was the sole judge of the competition. The contest was won by Toronto-based singing trio CZN, consisting of Seth Zosky, CJ Capital, and Matthew Novary Joseph. CZN later went on to compete in season 16 of America's Got Talent.

=== Season 2 (2022) ===
On June 8, 2021, Citytv announced that a reboot of Canada's Got Talent would premiere in 2022; Production on the series took place in 2021; unlike the first season (which filmed auditions across the country), the entirety of the season was filmed at the Avalon Theatre at Niagara Fallsview Casino Resort in Niagara Falls. On December 31, 2021, it was announced that the revival would premiere in March 2022, which was later specified as March 22. The season was won by Quebecois singer Jeanick Fournier.

=== Season 3 (2023) ===
Following the season two finale in May 2022, Citytv announced that it had renewed Canada's Got Talent for a new season to air in 2023; Rogers officially promoted it as being the second season of Canada's Got Talent, not acknowledging the 2012 season. The auditions were filmed at the OLG Stage at the Fallsview Casino Resort from October 19 to 23, 2022. The season premiered on March 21, 2023.

=== Season 4 (2024) ===
In May 2023, Canada's Got Talent was renewed for a third revived season, premiered on March 19, 2024. In addition to the $1 million prize package, $25,000 will be awarded to each recipient of the golden buzzer, making it the first known edition of the Got Talent franchise to attach a prize to the golden buzzer over and above the privilege of advancing in the competition.

=== Season 5 (2025) ===
The fourth revived season of Canada's Got Talent premiered on March 18, 2025. Ell returned as host, along with returning judges Offishall and Mandel. Judges Stratus and Singh did not return, with Katherine Ryan and Shania Twain joining the judging panel.

Rogers did not announce a sixth season during its 2025 upfronts, stating that the series would be placed on hiatus; Howie Mandel would move to The Price Is Right Tonight, a Canadian adaptation of fellow Fremantle format The Price Is Right, which premiered in its place in 2026.

== Ratings ==
Viewership and ratings per season of Canada's Got Talent
Season	Timeslot (ET)	Episodes	First aired		Last aired		TV season	Avg. viewers (millions)
Season	Timeslot (ET)	Episodes	Date	Viewers (millions)	Date	Viewers (millions)	TV season	Avg. viewers (millions)
1	Sunday 8:00 p.m. Monday 8:00 p.m.	22	March 4, 2012	1.463	May 14, 2012	0.459	2011–12	TBD
2	Tuesday 8:00 p.m.	9	March 22, 2022	0.858	May 17, 2022	0.884	2021–22	TBD
3	Tuesday 8:00 p.m.	9	March 21, 2023	0.539	May 16, 2023	TBD	2022–23	TBD
4	Tuesday 8:00 p.m.	9	March 19, 2024	TBD	May 14, 2024	TBD	2023–24	TBD
5	Tuesday 8:00 p.m.	9	March 18, 2025	TBD	May 13, 2025	TBD	2024–25	TBD
