= Dina Pugliese =

Canadian television personality (born 1974)

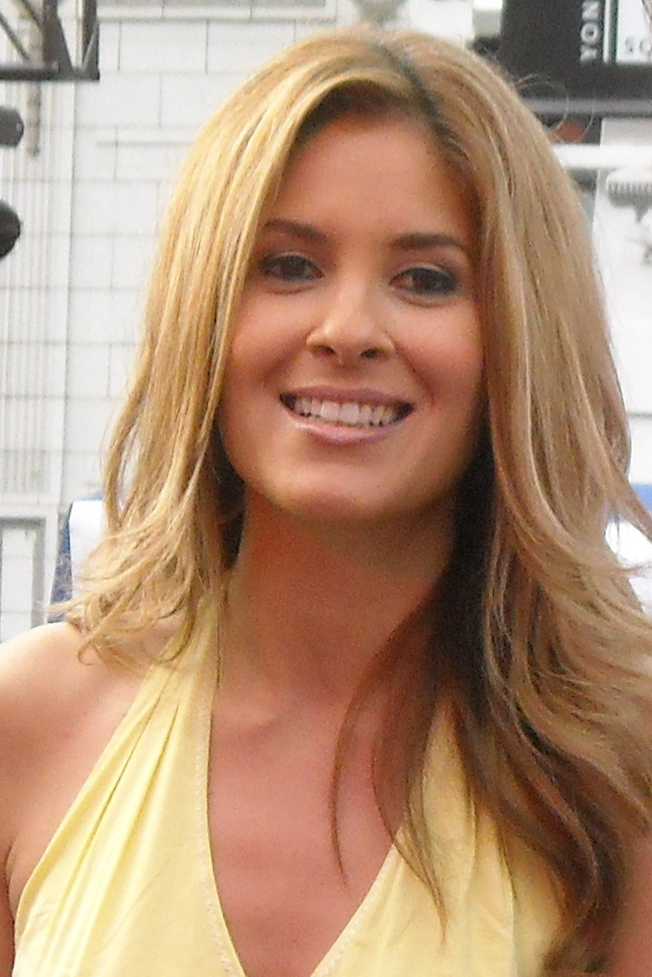
- Pugliese in 2007
- Born: May 22, 1974 (age 52); Toronto, Ontario, Canada
- Education: Humber College; York University (BA)
- Occupation: Morning show host
- Years active: 2004–present
- Known for: Breakfast Television
- Spouse: Alek Mirkovich (m. 2005)

Dina Pugliese (Italian: [ˈdiːna puʎˈʎeːze, -eːse]; born May 22, 1974) is a Canadian television personality. She has served as a co-host of Citytv's morning show Breakfast Television, initially from 2006 to 2023, and returning in 2025.

== Career ==
Born in Toronto, Pugliese grew up in Woodbridge, Ontario and is of Italian descent. She is a graduate of York University (Sociology and Mass Communications) and Humber College (Journalism). She began her career as a producer of Global's The Bynon Show and Toronto 1's Toronto Today, later becoming an entertainment reporter and host of The A-List and Star!'s Star! Daily. She has also hosted MuchMusic's VJ Search and Citytv's New Year's Eve special from Nathan Phillips Square. She is a past member of the Girl Guides of Canada. In 2006, she joined Citytv's morning show Breakfast Television, replacing Liza Fromer.

On October 17, 2011, Pugliese was announced as the host of Canada's Got Talent. The first season of the show ran in 2012.

On February 15, 2023, Pugliese announced that she would be leaving Breakfast Television after 16 years, with her final day on February 24. In a 2025 interview with the Toronto Star, she cited burnout from the role as one of the factors in her decision to leave, as well as a desire to care for her family; her husband had received surgery to remove a brain tumour, while her sister had recently been diagnosed with cancer. She explained that "I could not get enough rest in the beginning after I left and was wondering, am I ever going to have energy again? So it was a lot of resting and walking and cooking and cleaning and sleeping and then repeat. I had amazing job opportunities come my way, and I was so grateful for that, but I couldn't even imagine stepping onto a stage."

On March 17, 2025, in a surprise on-air announcement, Pugliese returned to Breakfast Television as its co-host alongside new arrival Tim Bolen. Her return was kept a secret from her colleagues, whom she surprised on-air by emerging from a moose costume. Pugliese had been offered an opportunity to return to the program during a meeting with its executive producer Claire Adams, finding that Breakfast Television was "the one thing that was missing over the last two years. I finally felt ready and prepared, and rested and recovered enough to get back to it."

In June 2025, Pugliese was announced as host of Bake Master Battle for Food Network.

== Awards ==
2006 – Gemini Award nomination for Best Host in a Lifestyle/Practical Information or Performing Arts Program or Series for MuchMusic VJ Search – The Series.

2023 – On February 24, 2023, she was presented a Key to the City of Vaughan by Mayor Steven Del Duca for her "outstanding contribution" to the entertainment industry.

== Personal life ==
Pugliese is married to Alek Mirkovich, founder of campayn.com.
