= Korean Canadians =

Ethnic group

Korean Canadians Coréo-Canadiens
- (South Korea) (Canada)
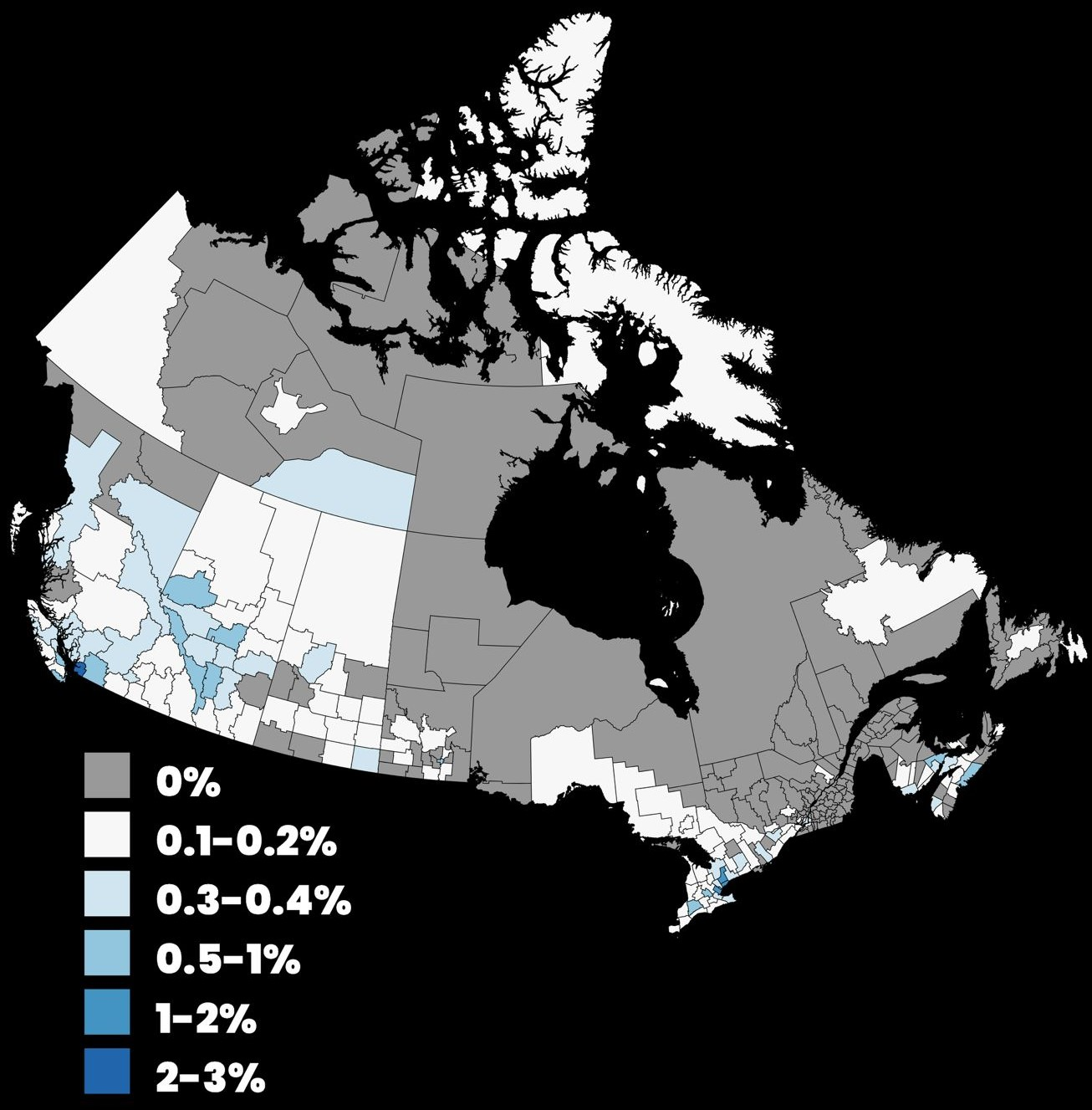
- Population distribution of Korean Canadians by census division, 2021 census

Total population
- 218,140; 0.58% of the Canadian population (2021)

Regions with significant populations
- Greater Toronto Area (Koreatown), Greater Vancouver (Lougheed Town Centre)

Languages
- Korean, English, French

Religion
- Protestant (51%), Catholic (25%), Irreligion (20%), Buddhism (4%)

Related ethnic groups
- Korean Americans, other East Asian Canadians

- Korean Canadians
- Hangul: 한국계 캐나다인
- Hanja: 韓國系 캐나다人
- RR: Hangukgye Kaenadain
- MR: Han'gukkye K'aenadain

Korean Canadians (French: Coréo-Canadiens) are Canadian citizens of full or partial Korean ancestry. As of 2016, Korean Canadians are the 8th largest group of Asian Canadians.

Korean immigration to Canada began with seminary students in the 1940s and accelerated during the 1990s. According to the 2021 Canadian Census, there were 218,140 Korean Canadians in Canada. According to South Korea's Ministry of Foreign Affairs and Trade, there were 241,750 ethnic Koreans or people of Korean descent living in Canada as of 2019, making them the fourth-largest Korean diaspora population (behind Koreans in China, Koreans in the United States, and Koreans in Japan, and ahead of Koreans in Russia, Koreans in Uzbekistan and Koreans in Australia).

== History ==
The first Koreans to live in Canada were local Christians sent by Canadian missionaries as seminary students. Tae-yon Whang is largely regarded as the first recorded Korean immigrant to go to Canada. Tae-yon Whang visited Canada in 1948 as a mission-sponsored medical intern, and stayed in Toronto after his term was over. Unlike Korean Americans who have relatively much longer history settling in the United States, very few settled in Canada; as late as 1965, the total permanent Korean population of Canada was estimated at only 70. However, with the 1966 reform of Canadian immigration laws, South Korean immigration to Canada began to grow. By 1969, there were an estimated 2000 Koreans in Canada. Between 1970 and 1980, 18,148 Koreans immigrated to Canada, and another 17,583 arrived in the following decade. In the late 1990s, South Korea became the fifth-largest source of immigrants to Canada. Toronto has the country's largest absolute number of Koreans, but Vancouver is experiencing the highest rate of growth in its Korean population, with a 69% increase since 1996. Montreal was the third most popular destination for Korean migrants during this period. In 2001, the number of Korean emigrants headed for Canada exceeded the number headed for the United States. The number of temporary residents has also grown ever since the Canadian government granted a visa waiver to South Korea; South Korea was the largest supplier of international students to Canada in the late 1990s. Aside from South Korea, some immigrants are also drawn from among the population of Koreans in China.

The 1990s growth in South Korean migration to Canada occurred at a time when Canadian unemployment was high and income growth was low relative to the United States. One pair of researchers demonstrated that numbers of migrants were correlated with the exchange rate; the weakness of the Canadian dollar relative to the United States dollar meant that South Korean migrants bringing savings to Canada for investment would be relatively richer than those going to the United States. Other factors suggested as drivers behind the growth of South Korean immigration to Canada included domestic anti-Americanism and the large presence of Canadian English teachers in local hagwon.

== Korean communities ==
Several Korean communities have developed in Canada since the migration after 1966. The two most concentrated areas are the Koreatown in Toronto and burgeoning Korean communities in Coquitlam and Vancouver.

=== Toronto ===
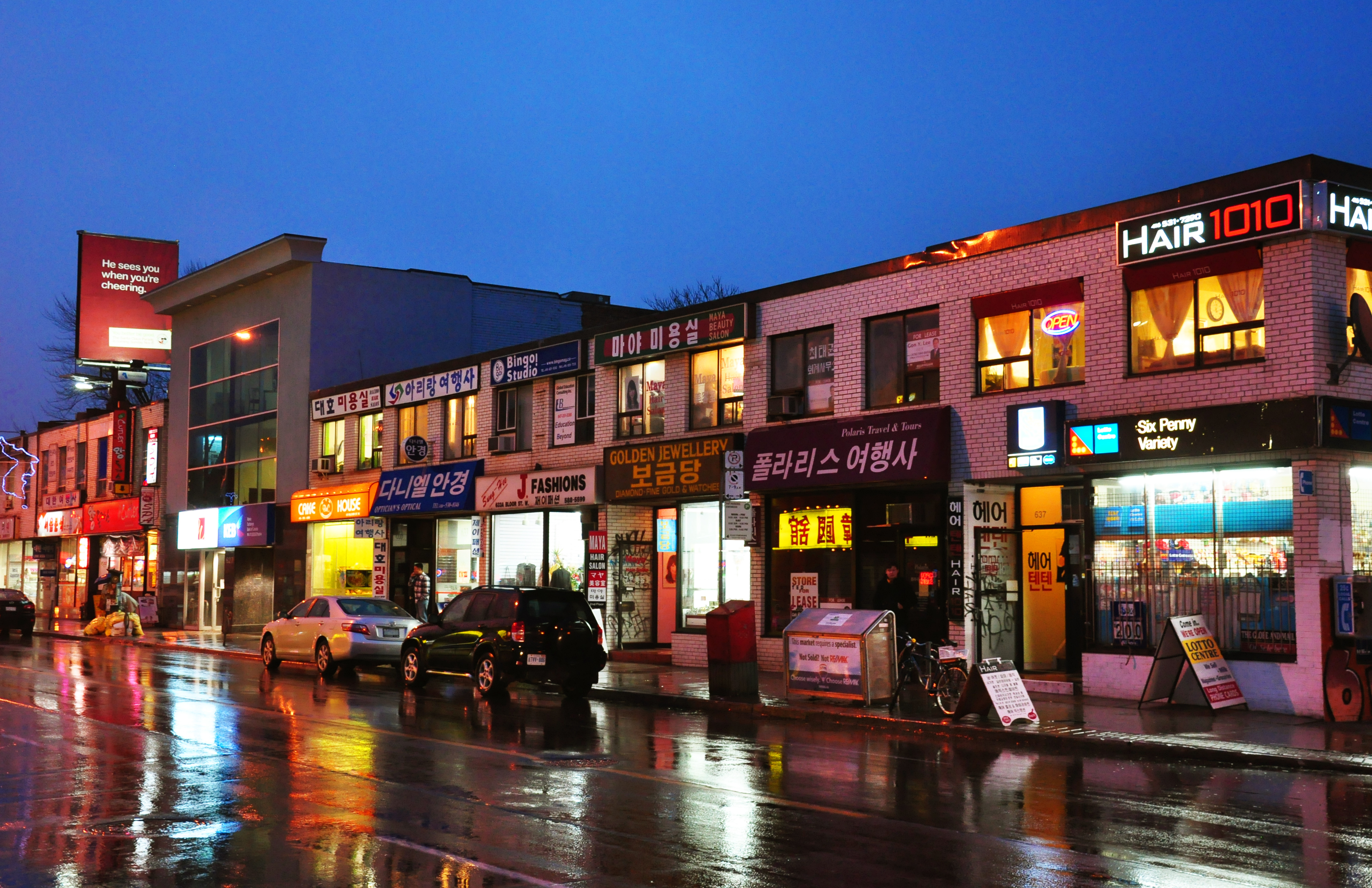
Korean businesses and restaurants along Bloor Street in Toronto's Koreatown.

A portion of Seaton Village on Bloor St. from Bathurst St. to Christie St. was designated as Koreatown in 2004. According to the 2001 census Toronto had roughly 43,000 Koreans living in the city, and in 2011 the numbers have grown to 64,755. The Korean community in Toronto has developed Koreatown such that it offers a Korean grocery store, hairdressers, karaoke bars and a multitude of restaurants. The City of Toronto describes Koreatown as "Korea Town is primarily a business district offering a wide range of Korean restaurants, high-end-fashion Korean boutiques, herbalists, acupuncturist and many other unique services and shops which are filled with made-in-Korea merchandise." Koreatown Toronto is also known for its Spring Dano Festival which is run on the 5th day of 5th month of the Korean Lunar Calendar. The festival is run is the Christie Pits area and has been run for the past 21 years with the exception of 2013 when it was cancelled.

The Willowdale and Newtonbrook areas in North York have large numbers of Korean businesses running from Yonge St. between Sheppard Ave. and Steeles Ave. Dubbed Koreatown North, it has a growing number of Koreans residing in the area. This area first appeared in the 1990s and its growth accelerated from the late 1990s onwards. In the 2000s the community expanded into York Region with the area centered along Yonge Street in what is referred to as Thornhill (Vaughan and Markham).

=== Greater Vancouver ===
Korean communities in Greater Vancouver are not officially designated as Koreatowns, although the name has been used by business districts with a high number of Korean businesses. British Columbia has the second largest Korean community in Canada with 53,770 residents, 49,880 of whom live in Greater Vancouver. The Korean community in Vancouver is located between Nicola and Denman Street and consists of numerous Korean restaurants and other businesses. Several residents have advocated the area be officially designated as Koreatown.

The city of Coquitlam also has a significant Korean community. As of 2011 the population of Koreans in Coquitlam was approximately 7,900. The business district at North Road and Lougheed Highway consists of many Korean restaurants, grocery chains, salons, and other businesses, most of which have Korean signage.

== Demographics ==
Province	Korean population (2021)	% of provincial population (2021)
Ontario	100,025	0.7%
British Columbia	72,025	1.5%
Alberta	24,170	0.6%
Quebec	10,655	0.1%
Manitoba	4,250	0.3%
Nova Scotia	2,545	0.3%
Saskatchewan	1,950	0.2%
New Brunswick	1,480	0.2%
Newfoundland and Labrador	225	0.0%
Prince Edward Island	130	0.1%
Yukon	100	0.3%
Northwest Territories	75	0.2%
Nunavut	15	0.0%
Canada	217,650	0.6%

2007 figures from the South Korean Ministry of Foreign Affairs and Trade showed 86,084 Canadian citizens, 72,077 permanent residents, 20,738 people on student visas, and 19,271 other temporary residents. The Canada 2001 Census recorded 101,715 Canadians of Korean descent, but Korean community leaders and media organisations suspected that it undercounted the population, especially mobile short-term residents such as English as a Foreign Language students. According to the Canada 1996 Census, 53.6% of Korean immigrants to Canada had attended a four-year tertiary institution, as compared to 23% of the general population. However, because their qualifications and technical certifications are often not recognised by Canadian employers, Korean immigrants often take jobs not commensurate with their education; 40% worked in family-owned businesses, and their average personal income is only 67% that of the average Canadian resident.

== Religion ==
=== Christianity ===
==== Protestant ====
===== Pre-Modern Era =====
Translation by James Scarth Gale

The foundations of the bilateral relationship between Canada and Korea, first began with Canadian Christian missionaries. They aided the Korean people both with medical, agricultural, and evangelical needs; kickstarting the modernization of Korea and bridging the gap for Korean immigrants. The earliest known contact between Korean and Canadian citizens can be traced back to the Canadian missionaries that settled in Korea in 1888. The first Canadian to arrive in Korea on missionary work was James Gale who arrived in Korea on December 15, 1888. Gale contributed massively to the fostering of Korean-Canadian relations as he immersed himself in the culture, adopting the Korean way of living, and ultimately published the first Korean-English dictionary in 1897. Gale was the first of many Canadian missionaries to immerse themselves in Korean culture, and the outward respect shown by the missionaries earned them trust from the Korean locals. This trust-based relationship was emphasized during the Japanese occupation of Korea from 1950 to 1953, when Korean people found refuge in Canada through their connections with the Canadian missionaries that had returned to Canada, a majority of them being sent back under Japanese rule. The missionaries that resided in Canada aided Korean immigrants with their own immigration to Canada, fostering a strong sense of community and resilience.

===== Christianity and Immigration =====
The migration of Koreans to Canada began in significant numbers in the 1960s and 70s, following the changes in Canadian immigration policy. Notably, the established diplomatic relations between the two countries in 1963, had increased until the mid-1980s where the Canadian government doubled their immigrant targets. Many of these immigrants were Christians who sought to maintain their faith in their new country. Korean churches became central institutions for immigrant communities, offering spiritual guidance, social support and cultural preservation. These churches provided services in Korean, facilitated networking opportunities, and helped new immigrants adapt to Canadian society while maintaining and preserving their ethnic identity. The church also served as a hub for Korean language schools, cultural events, etc.

As immigrants faced challenges such as language barriers, employment struggles, and cultural assimilation, churches played a crucial role in providing a supportive environment and network. Many Korean-Canadian churches functioned as informal settlement agencies, assisting new immigrants with housing, jobs, and navigating government agencies. Additionally, Korean churches in Canada adapted to the changing needs of their congregations, by incorporating elements of both Korean and Canadian cultures in services. Many first generation immigrants maintained traditional Korean-style services, while second and third generation Korean-Canadians gravitated toward English services with Western sermon styles. These shifts highlighted the ever evolving role of the church as a mediator between cultural preservation and integration into Canadian society.

===== Modern Christianity =====
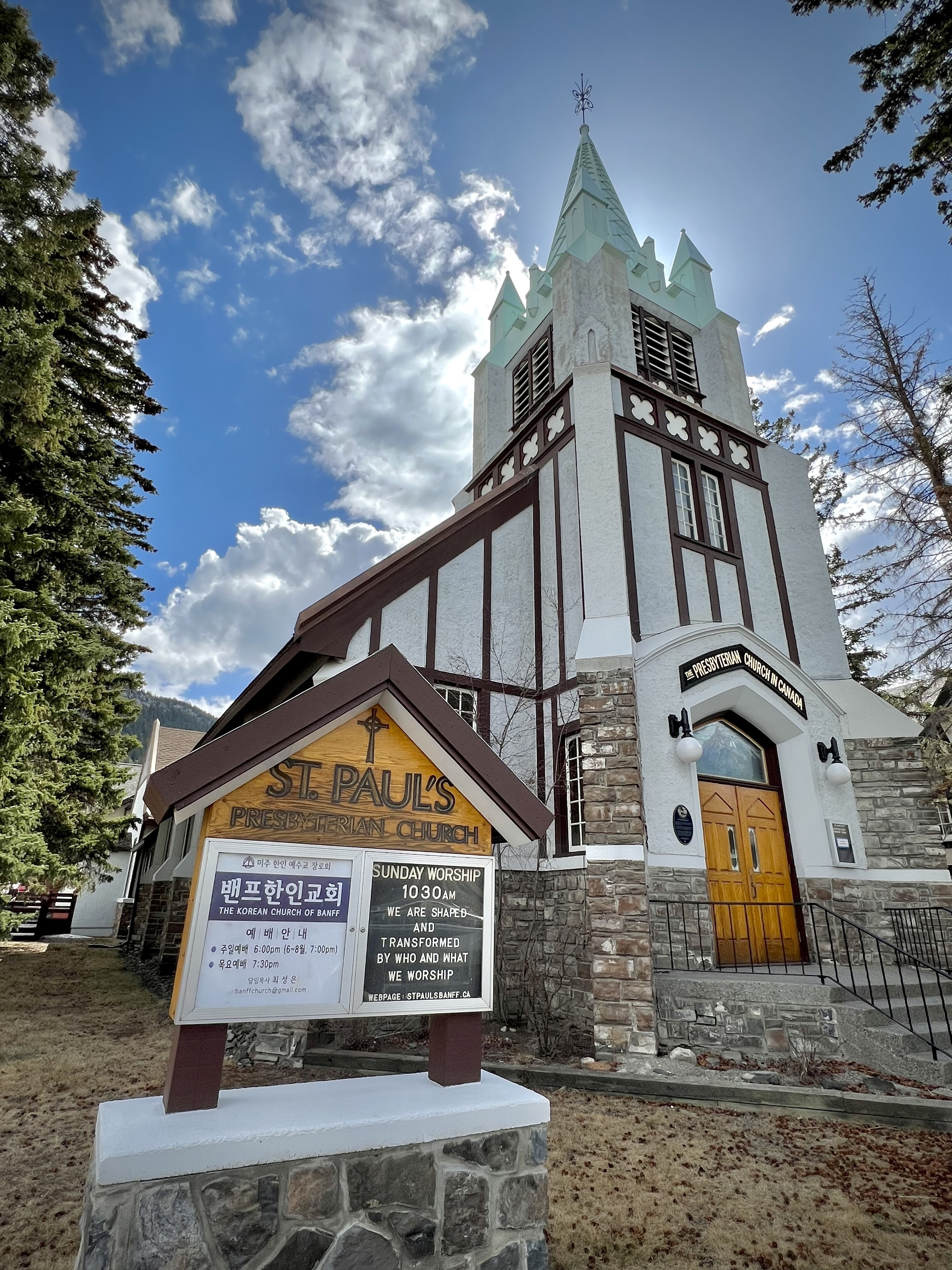
Korean-Canadian Church in Banff, Alberta

Today, Christianity remains a dominant religious affiliation among Korean-Canadians, with a significant number identifying as Protestant or Catholic. Korean churches have continued to evolve, addressing the needs of second and third generation Korean-Canadians who may be more assimilated into Canadian culture. Many churches offer bilingual services, youth ministries, and outreach programs that cater to a diverse population and congregation. The role of the church has expanded beyond religious worship, and serves as a bridge between generations and fostering a dual Korean-Canadian identity.

In response to generational shifts, many Korean churches have adapted by integrating contemporary worship styles, emphasizing youth engagement, and more. With younger Korean-Canadians often facing linguistic and cultural barriers with traditional congregations, many churches now incorporate English-speaking services and leadership opportunities for second and third generation individuals. This shift has allowed for a more inclusive and intergenerational approach to church.

Korean Canadian demography by religion
Religious group	2021 (Note: Religious breakdown proportions based on "Korean" ethnic or cultural origin response on the 2021 census.)		2001 (Note: Religious breakdown proportions based on "Korean" ethnic or cultural origin response on the 2001 census.)	
Religious group	Pop.	%	Pop.	%
Christianity	124,530	57.22%	76,735	75.44%
Islam	275	0.13%	85	0.08%
Irreligion	88,640	40.73%	20,725	20.38%
Judaism	225	0.1%	105	0.1%
Buddhism	3,700	1.7%	3,875	3.81%
Hinduism	25	0.01%	20	0.02%
Indigenous spirituality	25	0.01%	130	0.13%
Sikhism	15	0.01%	10	0.01%
Other	220	0.1%	30	0.03%
Total Korean Canadian population	217,650	100%	101,715	100%

Korean Canadian demography by Christian sects
Religious group	2021		2001	
Religious group	Pop.	%	Pop.	%
Catholic	34,030	27.33%	24,945	32.51%
Orthodox	555	0.45%	250	0.33%
Protestant	38,995	31.31%	32,165	41.92%
Other Christian	50,950	40.91%	19,375	25.25%
Total Korean Canadian Christian population	124,530	100%	76,735	100%

== South Korea - Canada Education Immigration ==
Education plays an important role in South Korean society and as such South Korean parents are always seeking the best for their children when it comes to their educational experience. English language acquisition has also emerged as an important value amongst many South Koreans in what is commonly referred to as English mania. In an article by Park and Abelman they reference the importance of English language acquisition when they say, ”This said, however, the practical mastery of English is an increasingly valuable commodity throughout the world. As David Crystal (2003:4, 6) and others have powerfully asserted, it is arguably the world's first "global language," a language used by more people than any other language and one with a "special role that is recognized in every country." With the value of both education and English language education in mind many families have merged these two values together and make the decision to migrate to English speaking countries such as Canada and the United States to pursue primary education for their children in English speaking environments.

In the case of Korean society this has also created the phenomenon of Kirogi Families. “Unlike studies on international students in higher education, scholars studying education migration for minors focus on a split family structure where the father works as a breadwinner in the source country and the mother is separated from her partner and living abroad with the children in the host country. This gendered ‘family project’ is premised on the belief that educating children in Western English-speaking countries will ensure social, economic, and cultural capital not only for the children's but also for the family's future in a globalized world (Kwak, 2008). This transnational family structure has been often referred to in media and scholarly literature as wild geese family or kirogi gajok in Korean.” This phenomenon has created a separation of families where both parents sacrifice aspects of their own lives for the betterment of their children.

This type of migration offers many benefits but also some difficulties. In a study by Soon Young Jang, data was collected from eight South Korean mothers who had relocated to Canada To pursue primary education for their children. The study examines the mothers' decision making process for early education programs and language acquisition in preparation for primary schooling within the Canadian system. “With respect to the Korean mothers’ language preference for their children, all the participants responded that they wanted their children to be fully bilingual in Korean and English. However, there was a shift found in their emphasis on each language.” In the mothers experience when selecting a program for their children they all opted for English monologuing only programs as it was a common opinion that their children were exposed to Korean language at home so they needed to be fully emerged in English language to get the most benefit, and all the mothers put a priority on English language acquisition. However, as time went on with these programs the observed results were that as the children's English language proficiency increased their Korean language proficiency and frequency in which Korean was used decreased. This was a major concern for all the mothers as it was a common expression for all of them that keeping their children's Korean language proficiency was equally important to gaining English proficiency as the Korean language was a means to keep their Korean heritage and ethnic Identity. This dual priority has resulted in a need to both understand the importance of assimilating into a new environment and society but also maintaining the cultural heritage and connection to your home country.

== Media ==
According to Statistics Canada, the 2021 consensus reported an approximate 217,650 with Korean descent live in Canada. With one of the biggest Asian diaspora community, media such as print, digital and broadcasting platforms were created to serve as a target towards the Korean diaspora of Canada. The 2021 census confirmed that there was approximately a total of 168,000 first generation Korean immigrants, 44,800 second generation Koreans and 5,000 third generation Korean. According to a study done by Kyong Yoon, first generation Korean parents often rely on locally produced Korean language media as an easier way to connect to information and entertainment. With the rise of the Korean Wave (Hallyu) many Korean youths (second and third generation Korean Canadians) use digital media to reconnect with their homeland and connection to their cultural roots.

Notable cultural depictions of Korean Canadian characters have included Ins Choi's theatrical play Kim's Convenience and its television adaptation, and the theatrical films Queen of the Morning Calm, Riceboy Sleeps and Mongrels.

=== Korean Representation ===
Studies have shown that Asian characters in media are widely underrepresented in film and television series. In a study done by researchers from the Annenberg Inclusion Initiative at USC, about 5.9% of actors featured in popular trending films were from Asian descent, only about 15% are Korean. In 2022, an audit report from the Vancouver Asian Film Festival reported that less than 10% (8.8%) are of Asian descent representing in major roles on Canadian broadcast and stated that that “Canadian broadcasters have gotten a failing grade on Asian representation.” further revealing the little representation Korean has in Canadian media despite Canada promoting multiculturalism as their strength.

==== Portrayal in Film and Television ====
A study done on 1,300 top grossing films in North America in 2021, found that only 3.4% of the main lead or co-lead were given to those of Asian descent. Only 24% were given supporting roles, and 72.5% of the roles given were insignificant to the plot. In many cases, Korean portrayal in Canadian media have been poorly represented regardless of if the role was a lead, supporting or just insignificant. According to Kyong Yoon, the reason for this absence and lack of representation or misrepresentation on Canadian TV is because it may serve as function “to justify the White-dominant cultural frame that maintains and reinforces “the [White] gaze and the lens of the Western world” Yoon states on behalf of interview participants that: “the default characters in media content were always White and thus they did not have room for even thinking about the absence or stereotyping of racialized people.” Stereotypes of Asians have been embraced since the eighteenth century, allowing for the model minority concept to grow in media while embracing the ideology of White privilege. A study found that most stereotypes of Asian characters that persisted on screen commonly portrayed the “perpetual foreigner” (nearly 18%) who spoke with a non-English accent. Other characters portrayed were either involved in violent deaths, emasculation, taking the role of a sidekick or villain, or were involved in racial/sexist slurs. With limited and inaccurate representation of Korean portrayals, diaspora youth may internalize the White-dominant cultural frame, and according to Kyong Yoon, may learn to “see themselves as ethnic or racial subjects” instead of seeing from their own perspectives. According to Sherry Yu (researcher from the University of Toronto), minorities, who have been invisible most of the time, when visible are generally stereotyped, become the problem people, or are whitewashed.

Kim’s Convenience had been highly praised to be the first Canadian television series to portray Korean Canadian immigrants with a primarily Asian Canadian cast, and was known to be a breakthrough for diversity as it was the first to represent the Korean diaspora community, before ending controversially in 2021. Despite starring an entire Asian Canadian cast, cast members such as Simu Liu spoke out, stating that there was a lack of diversity among writers and producers, discord behind the scenes and actors’ voices silenced when offering creative input.

==== Developments ====
While scholars suggests that Korean Canadians have historically been underrepresented in mainstream Canadian media (below 10% of the margin), recent development linked to the Korean wave (Hallyu) have contributed to an increased visibility in media and development of cultural pride. Kyong Yoon suggests that by continued engagement of non-western media in western contexts, it opens a new door for diversity in the global mediascape in which “the dominance of the Anglophone Western cultural content and representations are questioned.” In an article published onto the Ricepaper, Ji-yoon Ann (assistant professor at the University of British Colombia) states that “exposure to Korean culture is reshaping how Asians are represented in Western media”

=== List of Korean-Canadian Media ===
==== Films ====
- Riceboy Sleeps (2022)
- Mongrels (2024)
- Queen of the Morning Calm (2019)
- The Mother and the Bear (2024)
- In Between Days (2006)

==== Television ====
- Kim's Convenience (2016-2021)
- Gangnam Project (2024-Present)

==== Theatre ====
- Kim's Convenience (2011)

==== Online Streaming Services ====
- CBC Gem

==== Newspaper/Journalism ====
- The Korea Times Canada

== See also ==
- List of Korean Canadians
- Koreatown, Toronto
- East Asian Canadians
- Kim's Convenience
- Korean diaspora
