= The Annex =

- Neighbourhood
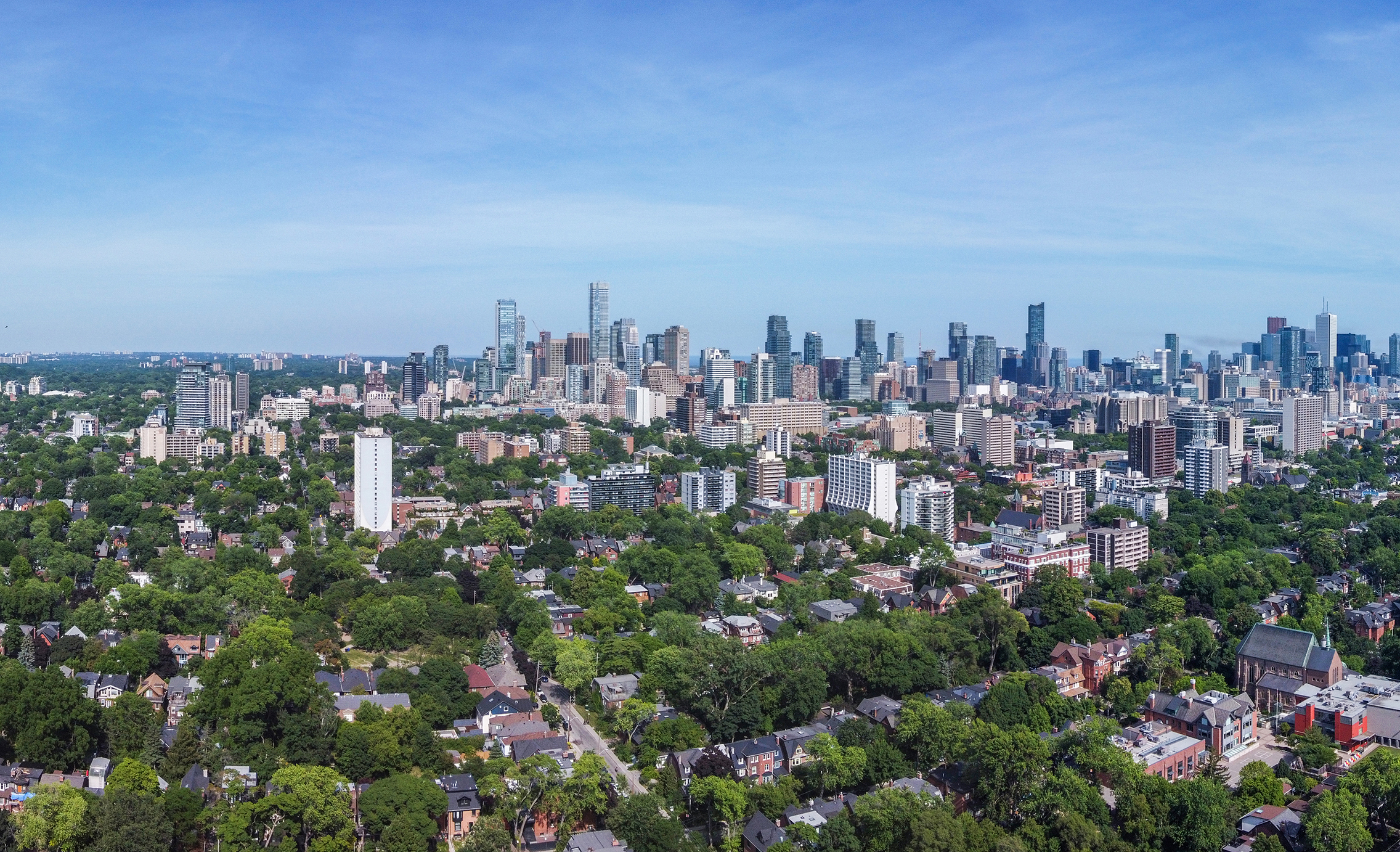
- Aerial view of the Annex in 2022

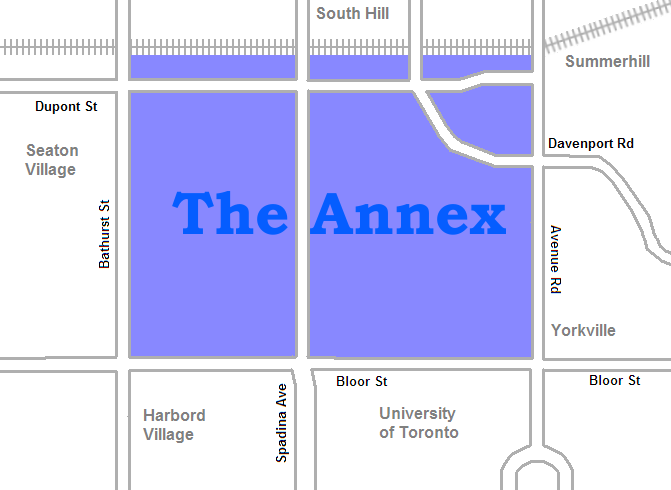

- Location within Toronto
- Coordinates: 43.670°N 79.404°W
- Country: Canada
- Province: Ontario
- City: Toronto

Government
  - MP: Danielle Martin (Liberal)
  - MPP: Jessica Bell (New Democratic)
  - Councillor: Dianne Saxe

Area
  - Total: 1.460 km^{2} (0.564 sq mi)

Population (2021)
  - Total: 14,140
  - Density: 9,685/km^{2} (25,080/sq mi)
- Demonym: Annegonian
- Time zone: UTC-05:00 (EST)
  - Summer (DST): UTC-04:00 (EDT)

The Annex is a neighbourhood in Midtown Toronto, Ontario, Canada. The traditional boundaries of the neighbourhood extend north to Dupont Street, south to Bloor Street, west to Bathurst Street and east to Avenue Road. The City of Toronto recognizes a broader neighbourhood definition that includes the adjacent Seaton Village and Yorkville areas.

Bordering the St. George campus of the University of Toronto, the Annex has long been a student quarter, and it is also home to many fraternity houses and members of the university's faculty. According to the 2011 Canadian census, the neighbourhood has an average income of $66,742.67, significantly above the average income in the Toronto census metropolitan area.

The Annex is known for its large population of immigrants – in 2011, Statistics Canada declared that there were about 4,665 immigrants (predominantly from the United Kingdom and the United States) living in the area. As of the 2021 census, the three census tracts that compose the Annex have a total population of 14,149 and an average population density of 9,685 people/km^{2}.

== Character ==
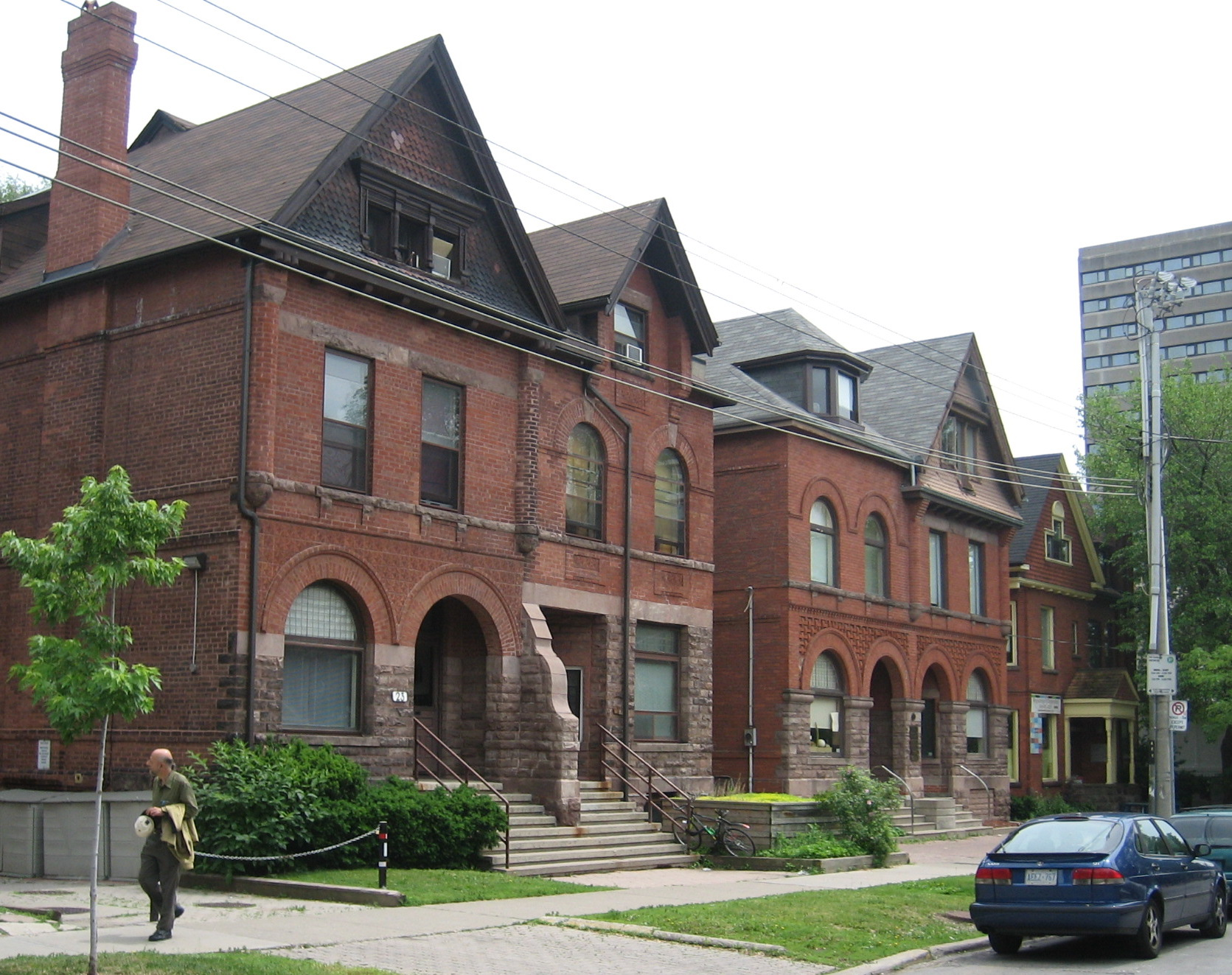
The area has many homes built in the late 19th century.

The Annex is mainly residential, and streets are lined with tall trees dwarfing the large Victorian and Edwardian houses, most of them built between 1880 and the early 1900s. The 1950s and 1960s saw the replacement of some houses with mid-rise (and a handful of high-rise) apartment buildings in the International style. These were surrounded with landscaped green spaces in an attempt to better fit into the neighbourhood. Due to a government freeze on development in 1975 for buildings higher than 45 feet, most of the original houses still exist.

There are now over 500 buildings in the Annex that are protected by the Toronto Historical Board, so developers have less chance of maximizing their ventures by tearing down old mansions and developing low rises and townhouse complexes. Some of architect Uno Prii's most expressive, sculptural apartment buildings are located in the Annex. Because of its proximity to the university, the Annex has a high rate of seasonal tenant turnover, and its residents range from university students to older long-time residents.

The stretch of Bloor Street between Avenue Road and Bathurst Street is a social and mixed-use area offering a wide range of services from moderate-priced dining to independent discount retailers, in buildings which often include residential space in upper floors.

Just west of the Annex proper, along Bloor Street (between Bathurst Street and Christie Street), there are street signs that post Koreatown due to the high percentage of Korean-owned businesses (although that neighbourhood is officially called Seaton Village), but many locals refer to the area as "West Annex" (even though the official West Annex area is bounded by Bloor, Bathurst, the CP Railway, and Spadina). During the 1950s and 1960s, an influx of Hungarian immigrants moved into the neighbourhood after the 1956 Hungarian Revolution was suppressed, and some of the businesses and properties along Bloor may still be owned by Hungarian-Canadian families.

=== Annex style house ===
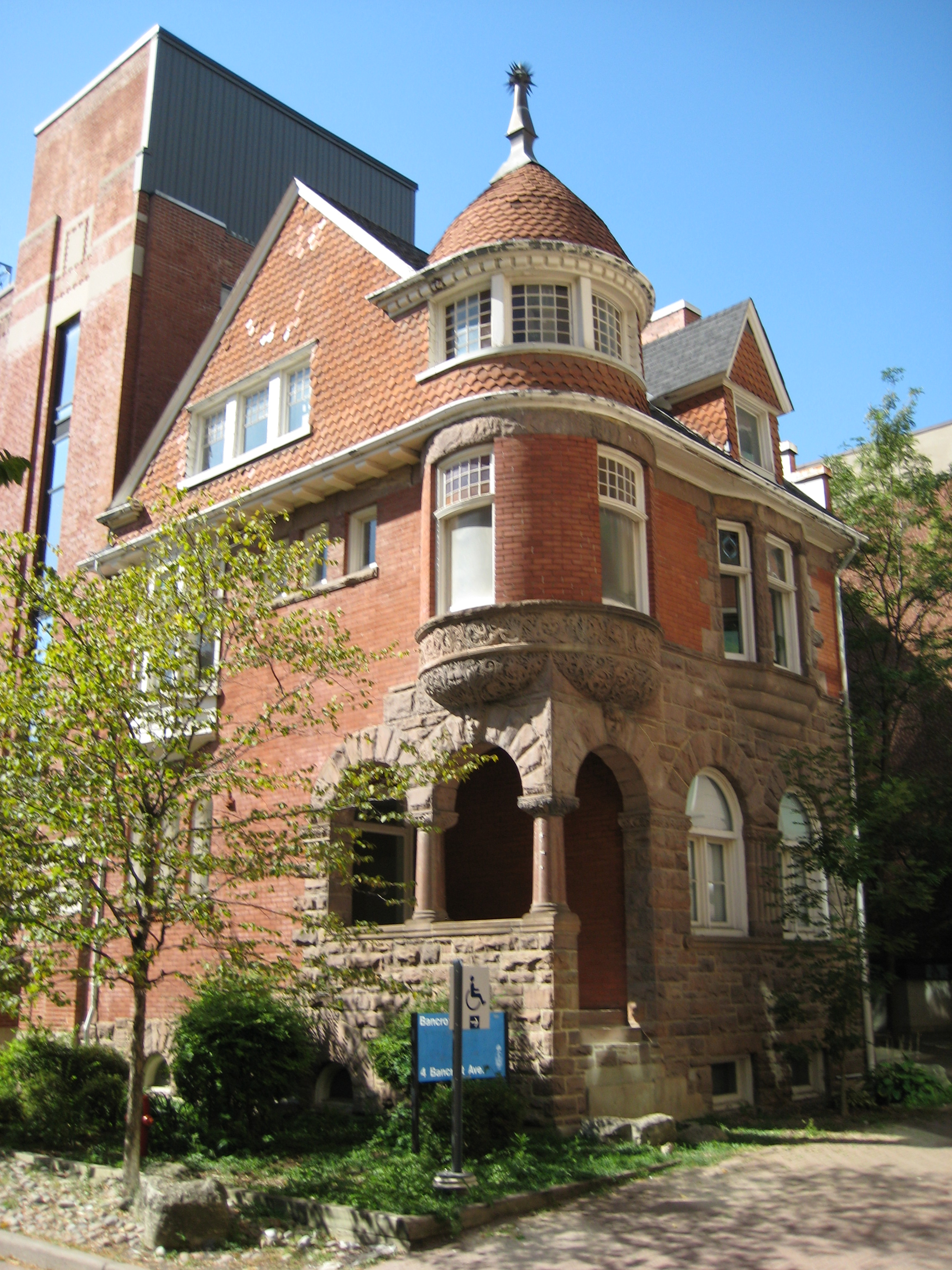
The University of Toronto's Robert Brown House at 4 Bancroft Avenue. The building is an example of an 'Annex style house', an architectural style common throughout the Annex.

The Annex is home to many examples of a uniquely Torontonian style of house that was popular among the city's elite in the late nineteenth century. Examples of this style survive in the former upper class areas along Jarvis and Sherbourne Street, and also around the University of Toronto St. George. Most of these buildings are found in the Annex, and the style is thus known by some as the 'Annex style house.'

The original conception is attributed to E. J. Lennox, the most prominent architect in late nineteenth century Toronto. His design for the residence of contractor Lewis Lukes at 37 Madison Avenue (completed in 1887) introduced a design that would be imitated and modified over the next two decades.

The Annex style house borrows elements from both the American Richardsonian Romanesque and the British Queen Anne Revival. Annex style houses typically feature large rounded Romanesque arches, along with Queen Anne style decorative items such as turrets. Attics are emphasized in the exterior architecture. The houses are most often made of brick, though some also incorporate Credit Valley sandstone.

Originally built for some of the city's wealthiest citizens, the houses are generally large. As the wealthy moved away from the neighbourhood, many of the houses were subdivided into apartments.

=== Seaton Village ===
Seaton Village, or the "West Annex" as it is sometimes incorrectly known, is west of Bathurst Street and includes the Koreatown shopping district at its southern border. While Seaton Village shares several characteristics with the Annex (notably its architecture and its popularity with University of Toronto students), it is generally quieter, more family-oriented, and has smaller, less expensive homes.

Vermont Square Park is near the centre of Seaton Village. The park has a playground, including a wading pool. St. Albans Boys and Girls club and the Bill Bolton hockey arena are also located in the park.

Clinton Street features a house almost totally covered with circular "woodcakes" cut from billiards cues.

== History ==
Historical population
| Year | Pop. | ±% |
|---|---|---|
| 2006 | 13,416 | — |
| 2011 | 14,155 | +5.5% |
| 2016 | 14,442 | +2.0% |
| 2021 | 14,140 | −2.1% |

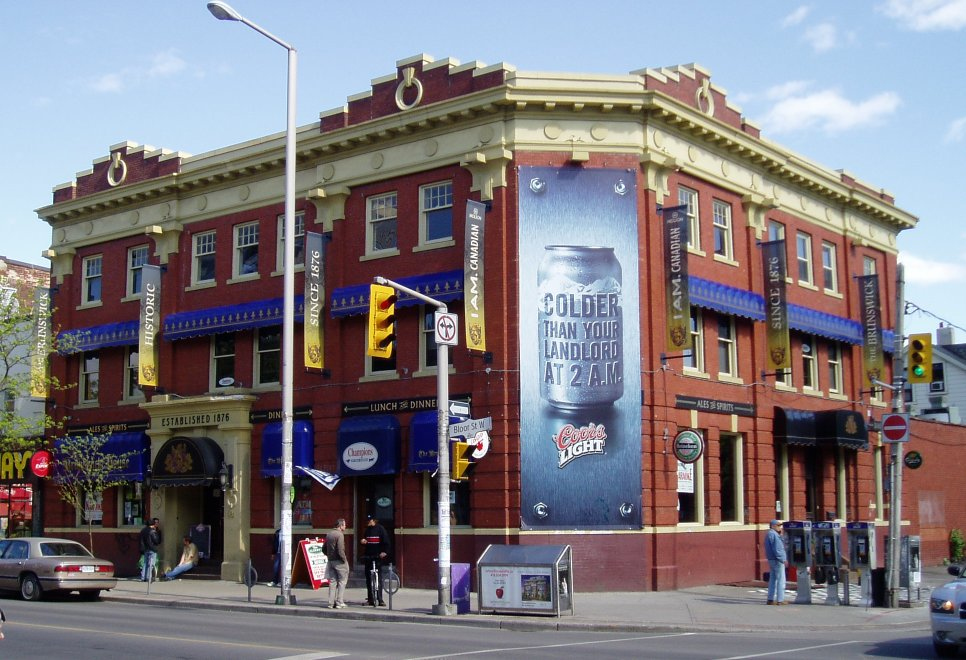
The Brunswick House was located within the Annex on Bloor Street.

European settlement of this area began in the 1790s when surveyors laid out York Township. The area east of Brunswick Avenue became part of the village of Yorkville, while the region west of Brunswick was part of Seaton Village. In 1883, Yorkville agreed to annexation with the City of Toronto. In 1886, Simeon Janes, a developer, created a subdivision which he called the Toronto Annex. The Annex area became part of Toronto in 1887 and Seaton Village joined Toronto in 1888.

First residents of the area included Timothy Eaton, patriarch of the Eatons Department Store, and George Gooderham Sr. (1830–1905), president of Gooderham & Worts Distillery. The Annex's first Golden Era lasted until the early 1900s, when the upper classes began to migrate northward above the Davenport escarpment to newer more fashionable suburbs in Forest Hill and Lawrence Park. The neighbourhood remained largely Anglo-Saxon until after WW II when Hungarian, Italians, Ukrainian immigrants started to move in.

In the 1960s, the proposed Spadina Expressway would have divided the Annex in half. Annex area residents, along with other resident grassroots groups, successfully opposed its construction.

=== Notable people ===
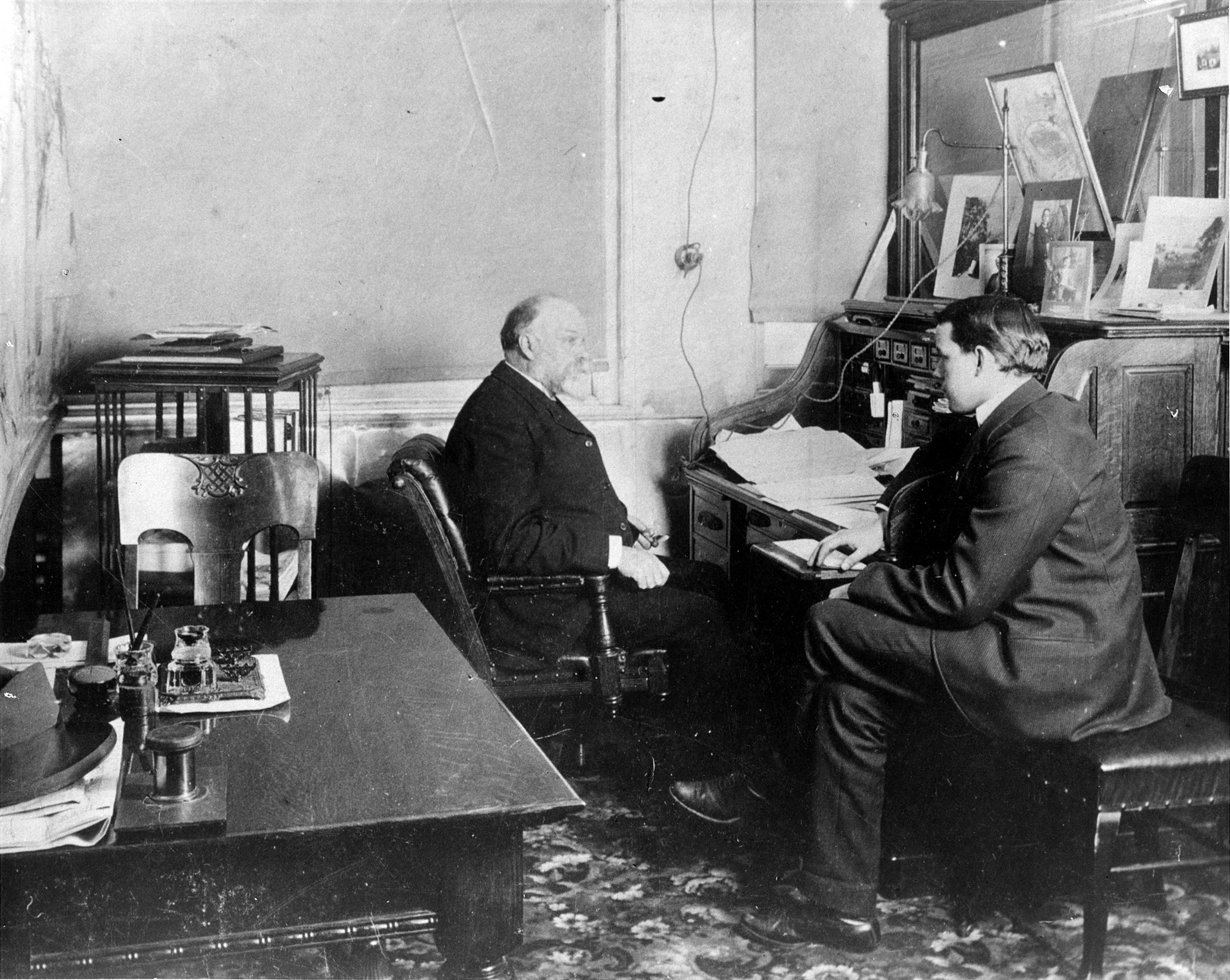
Timothy Eaton with his son, John. Many members of the Eaton family formerly lived in the Annex.

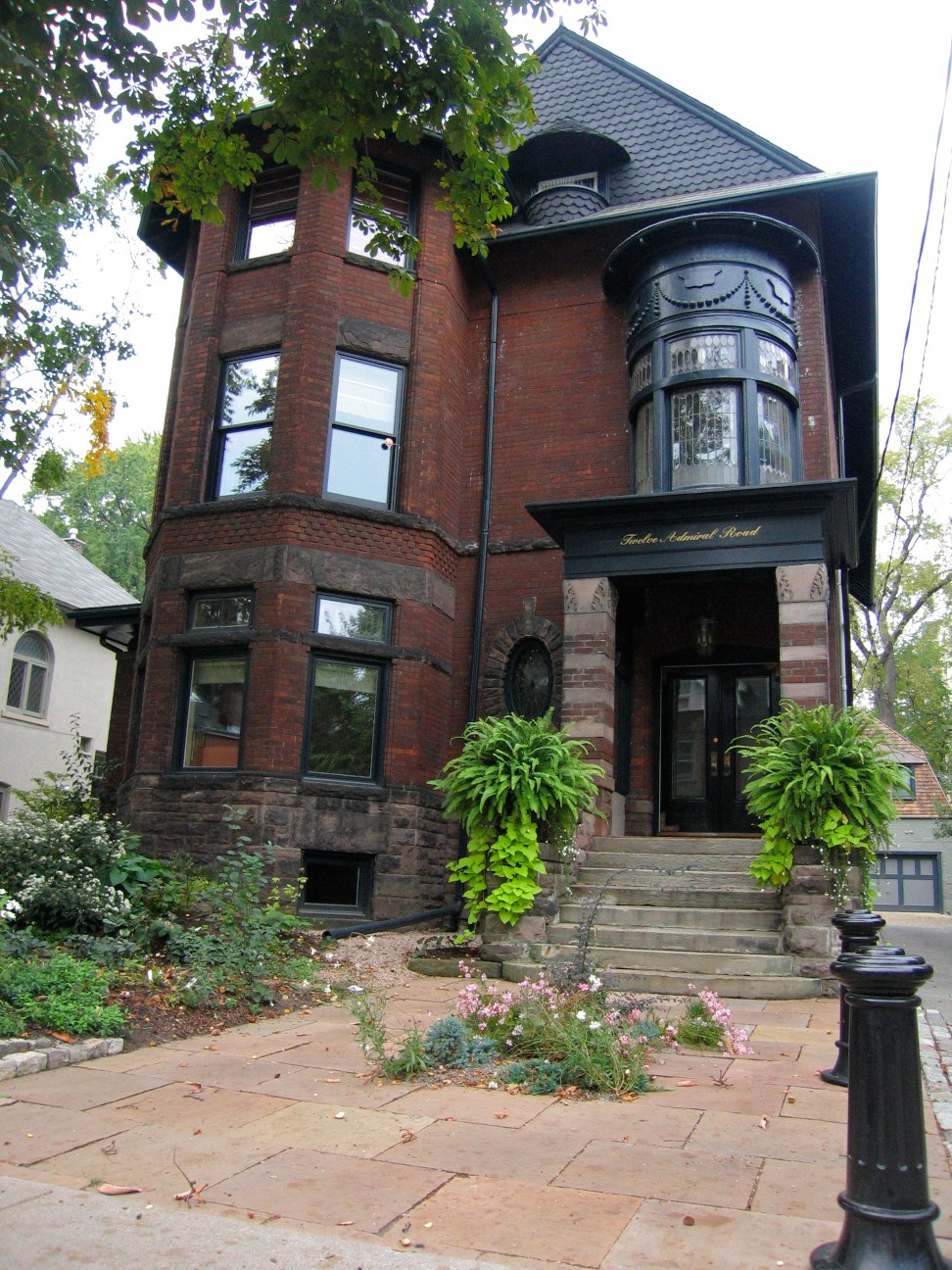
12 Admiral Road, former home of Lester B. Pearson (from 1925 to 1928).

The northern Annex (north of Bloor Street) was home to many members of Toronto's Eaton family and members of the Baldwin, Ross, and Simpson families until the mid-twentieth century. Timothy Eaton had his residence at the corner of Lowther Avenue and Walmer Road, and the Baldwin family built three houses on the northern side of Lowther near Bedford Road. Beatrice Worsley, who received the first PhD in what would now be called computer science and was the first female computer scientist in Canada, lived on Lowther on land which is now part of Bedford Park. Frederick Banting, the co-discoverer of insulin and recipient of the Nobel Prize for Medicine, lived on the south east corner of Lowther and Bedford Road.

Admiral Road in the Annex is home to the writer Margaret Atwood, as well as John Ralston Saul and his wife, the former Governor General of Canada Adrienne Clarkson. Her ex-husband Stephen Clarkson lived on nearby Lowther Avenue, across from former MP Belinda Stronach. Former Prime Minister and Nobel Laureate Lester B. Pearson lived at 12 Admiral Road from 1925 to 1928. bpnichol lived at 59 Admiral with Lea Hindley-Smith, founder of Therafields, and her family, from 1966.

David Suzuki lived for years on Bernard Avenue, and Catherine O'Hara lived in the Annex for several years. Explorer Norman Elder owned the Norman Elder Museum at 140 Bedford Road. The noted urban theorist and activist Jane Jacobs lived at 69 Albany Avenue from 1971 until her death in 2006. CBC writer, producer and actor Ken Finkleman and members of the rock band Sloan also reside in the neighbourhood.

Brunswick Avenue in particular has served as a home for many writers, including Matt Cohen, Austin Clarke, Morley Callaghan, Howard Engel, Marian Engel, and bpNichol. Katherine Govier, who wrote a collection of short stories entitled Fables of Brunswick Avenue (published in 1985), also lived on this street.

Seaton Village is the former home of Canadian poet and children's author Dennis Lee, Oscar-winning (for Chicago) sound engineer David Lee (no relation, now deceased), sociologist Barry Wellman, and Meghan Markle. It is the current home of novelist and playwright Ann-Marie MacDonald.

Major League Baseball All Star outfielder Goody Rosen also lived in the Annex.

== Transportation ==
The Annex is well served by public transit, including four Toronto Transit Commission (TTC) subway stations: Bathurst, Dupont, St. George, and Spadina. Spadina and St. George stations act as interchange stations, allowing passengers both north-west subway travel as well as east–west. Streetcar services run south from Bathurst and Spadina stations. Bus service operates on Avenue Road, Spadina Road, Dupont Street, Davenport Road, and northward on Bathurst Street.
