= The Greater Vancouver Korean Language School =

- 광역 밴쿠버 한국어학교
- Greater Vancouver, British Columbia

Information
- Former name: The Vancouver Korean Language School (Note: Korean: 밴쿠버 한국어학교; Hanja: 밴쿠버 韓國語學校; RR: Baenkubeo hangugeohakgyo)
- School type: Language school
- Established: December 21, 1973 (52 years ago)
- Website: http://homepy.korean.net/~vancouverschool/www/

The Greater Vancouver Korean Language School (Korean: 광역 밴쿠버 한국어학교; Hanja: 廣域 밴쿠버 韓國語學校; RR: Gwangyeong baenkubeo hangugeohakgyo) is a Korean language school located in Greater Vancouver, British Columbia. As the first Korean language school in British Columbia, it was established in 1973 for the purpose of teaching the Korean language and culture to Korean Canadian children. Initially, the school only offered Korean language classes, but soon added more subjects to the curriculum, including Korean history and culture, Taekwondo, Korean traditional dance, choir and fine arts.

The school is currently located at 5921 Kingsway, Burnaby, but it has rented a church or several public school buildings in the Greater Vancouver area prior to the current location. With an influx of Korean immigrants to British Columbia along with the growing number of student enrolments, the school established a branch at Coquitlam in 2006, at Surrey in 2008 and Killarney in 2012. After the founding of the school in 1973, other Korean language schools began to establish in British Columbia since then and therefore, there are 17 Korean language schools as of 2022. For the Korean Canadian immigrant parents in British Columbia, sending their children to the Korean language school is now a common investment in their children’s heritage language acquisition and maintenance. Currently, there are more than 400 graduates of the Greater Vancouver Korean Language School, and they either became university students or working professionals, including jobs such as a Canadian senator and a Canadian news anchor.

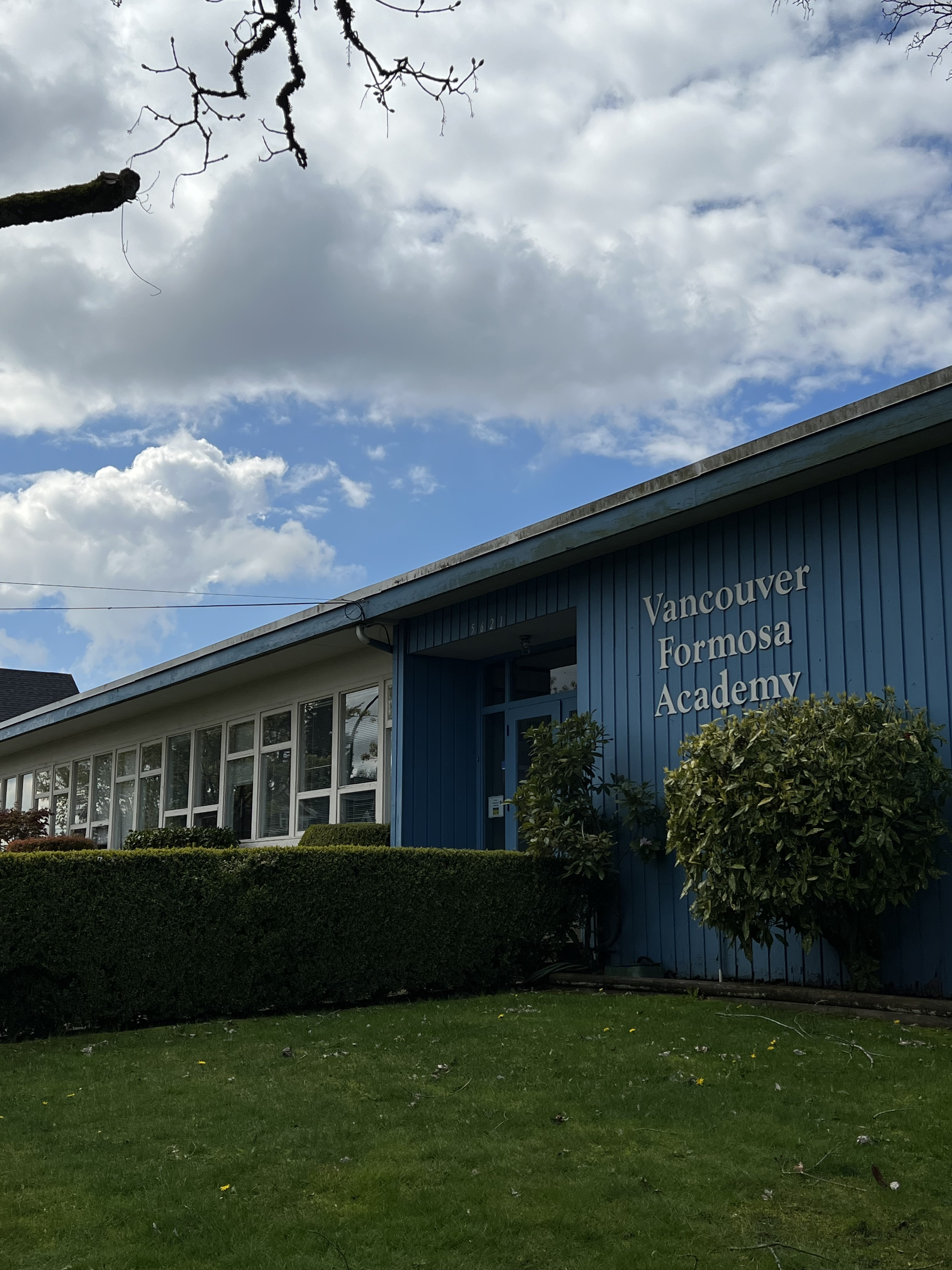
A photo of the Vancouver Formosa Academy, where the Greater Vancouver Korean Language School (Killarney branch) rents one of the classrooms to operate.

== History ==
=== Foundation and early years ===
The school was established on December 21, 1973, by Byeong-Seop Ban (the pastor of the Korean United Church of Vancouver), Seong-Woong Cho (the seventh president of the Korean Society of BC) and Myeong-Jun Choi (the Consul General of South Korea in Vancouver at the time). In the beginning, the president of the Korean Society of BC supported the school until it became independent from the Korean Society of BC in 1981. With the purpose of teaching the Korean language and Korean culture to the Korean Canadian children living in the greater Vancouver area, the Korean language classes began in February 1974 at the Korean United Church of Vancouver. Many Korean immigrant parents enrolled their children in the school in the hopes of bridging language barriers and assisting them in overcoming the cultural identity crisis that many second-generation immigrants face.

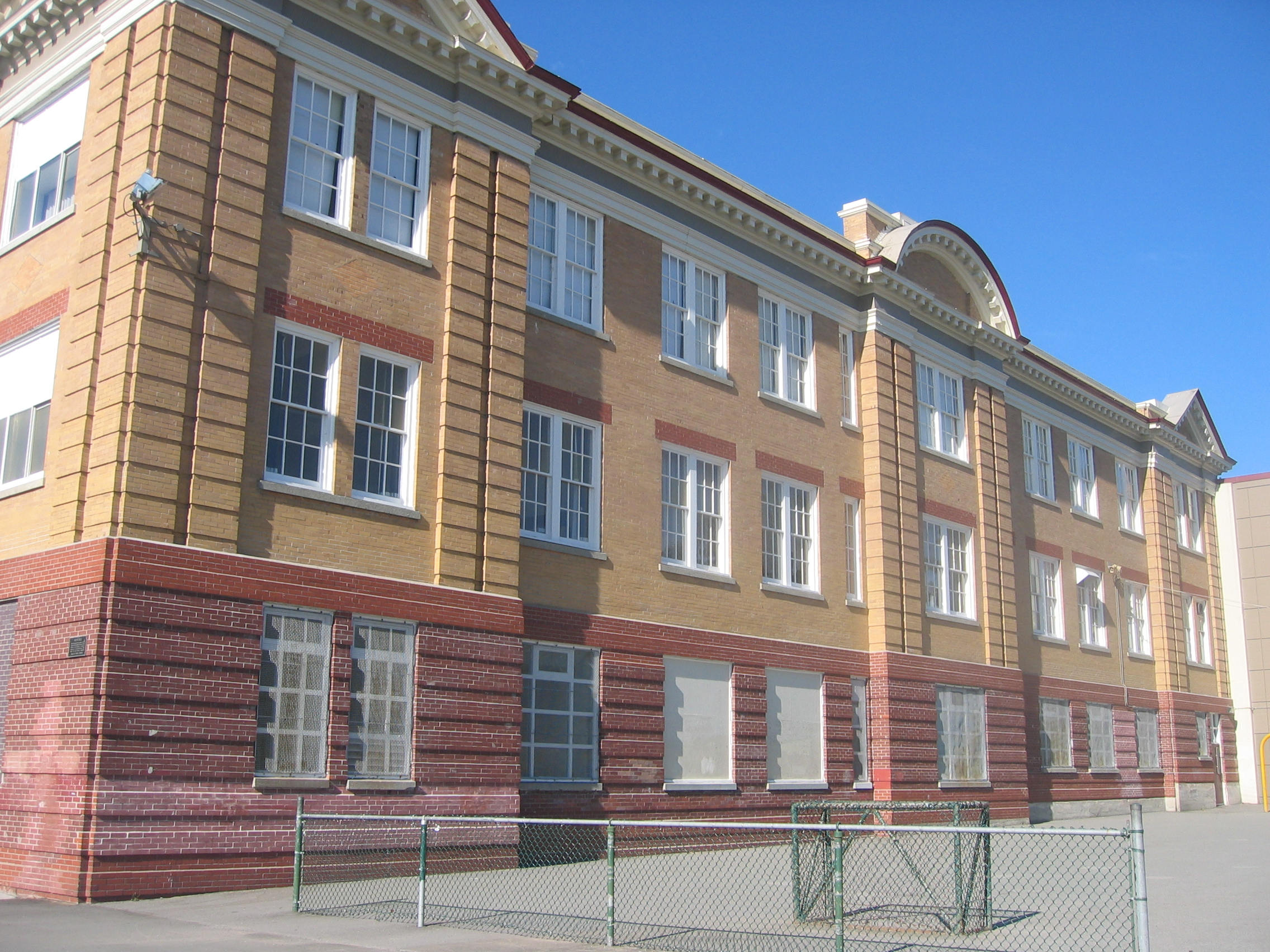
A photo of the Britannia Secondary School, which is one of the public schools that the Greater Vancouver Korean Language School rented during their early years.

During the early years of the school, some concerns were raised as the Korean immigrant parents in British Columbia thought that learning Korean would slow their children's English acquisition or interfere with their academics. Nevertheless, the school emphasized the importance of maintaining a heritage language as well as the benefits of bilingualism, by promoting the school in newspapers and attaching a fact-based article about second language acquisition to their school newsletters.

The school initially began with less than 30 students, but grew over the years, reaching 238 students in 1981. With the increasing number of student enrolments, logistic assistance has been provided primarily by the parents association and the number of classes that the school offered increased as well.

Prior to its current location in Burnaby, the school has rented a church or several public school buildings in the Vancouver area, including the Korean United Church, McPherson Park Junior High School, Britannia Secondary School, Champlain Heights Community School, and the Vancouver Technical Secondary School.

=== Recent history ===
With the increasing number of the student population, the school opened a branch at Coquitlam in 2006, at Surrey in 2008 and at Killarney in 2012. When the Killarney location was established, the school has been renamed from the Vancouver Korean Language School to the Greater Vancouver Korean Language School. As of 2022, the school rents facilities in four areas to operate a total of four branches in the Greater Vancouver area.

== Administration and organization ==
=== School governance ===
The school’s administration is governed by the board of governors, where the board manages the overall operation of the school from creating a safe learning environment to managing property and the school budget. The board also appoints the school’s principal and provides advice on academic management. The school’s principal is responsible for managing the overall academic operations of the school and the vice-principal assists the principal and oversees daily activities.

=== Teaching staff ===
The school recruits experienced teachers who have worked in elementary schools, middle schools or high schools in Korea, or those who have obtained a teaching certificate in Korea. For the elective classes such as Taekwondo, Korean Heritage traditional dance, choir and fine arts, the school recruits professional instructors specializing in each field.

=== Student registration process ===
School registration occurs at the beginning of September each year, but in some cases, students may be admitted at the beginning of each term. Upon registration, the students are expected to write a Korean Language School placement test, which helps to assess their Korean reading, writing, speaking and listening skills and match them to the language classes most appropriate for their level.

=== Finances ===
The school’s operational expenses are primarily derived from student tuition fees. But the donations from the individuals in the Korean Canadian community, the grants from the Government of Canada and the Ministry of Education in South Korea, as well as the revenues from their occasional fundraising campaigns, such as a snack sale, add to their budget.

==== Fees ====
Until 1981, the tuition for one term was $10. In 1982, the tuition fee increased, leading to $15 per term. The tuition did not include textbook costs, which varied depending on the Korean language class, ranging from $12.5 to $15 in the 1980s. Also, students who took Taekwondo classes were required to buy safety gloves and groin protectors for their safety.

Additionally, the school offered financial assistance based on demonstrated financial needs. For instance, in 1985, the board of governors waived tuition fees for fifteen students who had demonstrated financial aid. Also, since an individual in the B.C. Korean community named Sang-dae Son endowed the school with $1000 annually in the 1980s, the school had the Sang-dae Son Scholarship, which provided an opportunity for ten students in need to receive $100.

In 2007, the tuition for the school year was $300, which included the costs of textbooks.

=== School calendar ===
The school initially began providing Korean language classes on Sunday for two hours every week. In 1981, as the student enrolment increased and the school became independent from the Korean Society of BC, it began providing lessons from Sunday to Saturday. Since then, the school has been offering 3 hours of instruction every Saturday from 9:30 a.m. to 12:30 p.m., resulting in a total of 90 hours a year from September through June of the following year.

Since 1981, the academic year has been divided into three terms: Term 1, generally from mid-September to late November, Term 2, generally from early January to mid-March, and Term 3, generally from early April to late June. At the end of each semester, school events, such as an Open House and Korean speaking contests, are held, and at the end of the school year, a school concert is hosted.

== Curriculum ==
=== Korean language classes ===
The school initially offered four levels of Korean language classes for ages 4 to 18 years old: the kindergarten class, the beginner class, the intermediate class and the advanced class. The teachers mainly used textbooks to teach the students and assigned homework in each class to assess the students' improvements. At the end of the school year, students received their report cards. Also, these classes introduce the Korean Canadians to many other Korean Canadians, allowing them to build a network of Korean Canadian friends who reinforce their self-identification as Korean. As a result, more Korean is spoken in public transportations and on the streets of the lower mainland, increasing the visibility of the local Korean community as a distinct ethnic community.

In 1981, the school started delivering expert classes for students who had Korean skills beyond the advanced level.

In 1985, the school set up a Korean conversation class for Korean Canadian university students and adult foreigners who cannot speak Korean. For the 1985-1986 school year, two Caucasian students were enrolled in the Korean conversation class, thereby allowing the Greater Vancouver Korean Language School to begin offering the language classes to other ethnic groups in British Columbia.

In 1991, the school began preparing to write its own textbook, thinking that it would be more effective to use a textbook suited to the local situation than the general Korean textbooks that they bought from Korea. In 1993, the school completed writing its textbook, and after three years of editing, it was adopted as the school's official textbook in 1996. As the textbook contained materials applicable to the Vancouver context, it received positive feedback from students and parents.

=== Elective classes ===
In addition to the Korean language classes, the school began to offer elective classes in 1981. The subjects include Korean history and culture, Taekwondo, Korean traditional dance, choir and fine arts.

=== School concerts ===
Since its establishment, the Greater Vancouver Korean Language School has been conducting a school concert every year. The school concerts allow the students to showcase what they have learned over the school year to their parents and give an opportunity to introduce the language school to Korean immigrant parents who are interested in sending their children to the school. Each school concert starts with everyone singing “O Canada”, the national anthem of Canada, as well as “Aegukga”, the national anthem of South Korea. Then, the students perform what they have learned over the school year by singing Korean songs and performing Taekwondo or Korean traditional dance. Each Korean language class also presents a short play in Korean, based on the short stories that they have learned in class. For instance, in 1986, the students of the intermediate class performed a short play based on a Korean folktale called The Green Frogs written by Yumi Heo, while the students of the advanced class performed another Korean folktale called Heungbu and Nolbu.

== School newsletters ==
Starting from January 1981, the school printed out their school newsletters, written in Korean, in order to inform the students’ parents about school activities, events, news, classroom rules, student awards and community happenings. Although the school indicated that there is no set schedule to publish them, a minimum of two school newsletters per term were published.

== See also ==
- Korean Canadians
- List of Korean Canadians
- Korean diaspora
- Asian Canadians
- East Asian Canadians
