= List of Korean Canadians =

This is a list of notable Korean Canadians, including both Canadian citizens and residents.

== By profession ==
=== Academics ===
- Dr Jong Soo Park – Dalhousie biologist who found world's oldest known DNA
- Im-hak Ree – mathematician who developed Ree group
- Jin-me Yoon – educator and artist
- Chai-Shin Yu – academic and pastor who established the first Korean studies program in Canada at the University of Toronto

=== Actors & Actresses ===
- Ahn Hyo-seop – actor (Abyss (TV series))
- Andrea Bang – actress (Kim's Convenience)
- Diana Bang – actress
- Jasper Cho – actor (Descendants of the Sun)
- Ins Choi – actor, playwright and screenwriter (Kim's Convenience)
- Choi Woo-shik – actor (Parasite)
- Choi Yeo-jin – actress
- Tina Jung – actress (Strays, Make It Pop)
- Julien Kang – actor
- Lee Jae-yoon – actor (Weightlifting Fairy Kim Bok-joo)
- Paul Sun-Hyung Lee – actor (Kim's Convenience)
- Sandra Oh – actress (Double Happiness, Sideways, Grey's Anatomy and Killing Eve)
- Grace Park – actress (Battlestar Galactica and Hawaii Five-0)
- Anthony Shim – actor, filmmaker
- Jean Yoon – actress (Kim's Convenience), writer, poet and playwright

=== Artists ===
- Michael Cho – illustrator and cartoonist
- Ann Y. K. Choi – author
- June Hur – author
- Bryan Lee O'Malley – cartoonist

=== Humanitarian ===
- Hyeon Soo Lim – pastor who was detained in North Korea

=== Athletes ===
- Jacob Bryson - Ice Hockey Player
- Tommy Chang (martial artist) – Master of Hapkido/Taekwondo and stunt performer
- Denis Kang – mixed martial artist
- Gail Kim – professional wrestler
- Jung-Yul Kim – former football player for the Calgary Stampeders and Toronto Argonauts
- Michael Kim (footballer) – soccer manager, assistant manager for the South Korea national football team
- Philip Kim (breakdancer) - breakdancer, Olympic athlete
- Jim Paek – former National Hockey League player
- Zayne Parekh – Ice Hockey player
- Park Jong Soo – South Korean master of taekwondo
- Xaivian Lee – South Korean college basketball player

=== Media ===
- Ben Chin – news anchor
- Ins Choi – actor and playwright
- Nathalie Chung – journalist and news anchor
- Evan Fong – entertainer and YouTuber
- Maggie Kang - film director, creator of KPop Demon Hunters
- Tanya Kim – co-host of CTV's ETalk
- Jee Yun Lee – news anchor
- Mi-Jung Lee – anchor and producer
- Arnold Lim - filmmaker
- Min Reyes – political commentator and activist
- Albert Shin – filmmaker
- Celine Song - screenwriter, playwright, director of Past Lives
- Jenny Heijun Wills – writer, university professor
- Celeste Yim – comedian, writer for Saturday Night Live
- Jerome Yoo – filmmaker

=== Musicians ===
- Jacob Bae – singer and member of South Korean boy group The Boyz
- Alex Chu – actor and member of Clazziquai
- Trish Doan – bass player for the metal band Kittie
- G.NA – Korean Pop singer
- Jeon So-mi – soloist and former member of South Korean girl group I.O.I
- Keeho – singer and member of P1Harmony
- Korea Town Acid – electronic music producer and DJ
- Earl Lee – RBC Resident Conductor, Toronto Symphony Orchestra
- Mark Lee – singer and rapper, member of South Korean boy group NCT
- Kevin Moon – singer and member of South Korean boy group The Boyz
- Luna Li – singer/songwriter and multi-instrumentalist
- Ryu Sera – singer and former member of South Korean girl group Nine Muses
- Sik-K – Rapper signed to Jay Park's international hip-hop label H1ghr Music
- Seok Matthew – raised in Canada, singer and member of South Korean boy group ZEROBASEONE
- Stella – member of South Korean girl group Hearts2Hearts
- Wendy Shon – raised in Canada, singer and member of South Korean girl group Red Velvet
- Wonny Song – classical pianist
- Tablo – a member of Epik High
- Yejin – singer and former member of Brave Girls
- Young K – singer-songwriter and member of South Korean band Day6 (bassist and vocalist)
- Dabin (music producer) - musician, DJ, and record producer

=== Politicians ===
- Raymond Cho – Legislative Assembly of Ontario MPP for Scarborough North
- Stan Cho – Legislative Assembly of Ontario MPP for Willowdale
- Harold Kim – Deputy Mayor of Aurora, Ontario
- Steve Kim – City of Coquitlam Councillor
- Sandy Lee – Northwest Territories MLA for Range Lake
- Yonah Kim Martin – British Columbia Senator
- Jane Shin – British Columbia MLA for Burnaby-Lougheed
- Nelly Shin – MP for Port Moody—Coquitlam
