= 1972 Governor General's Awards =

Canadian literary award

Each winner of the 1972 Governor General's Awards for Literary Merit was selected by a panel of judges administered by the Canada Council for the Arts. The winners were given a $2500 cash prize.

== Winners ==
=== English Language ===
- Fiction: Robertson Davies, The Manticore
- Poetry or Drama: Dennis Lee, Civil Elegies and Other Poems
- Poetry or Drama: John Newlove, Lies

=== French Language ===
- Fiction: Antonine Maillet, Don l'Orignal
- Poetry or Drama: Gilles Hénault, Signaux pour les voyants
- Non-Fiction: Jean Hamelin and Yves Roby, Histoire économique du Québec 1851–1896
