= Alligator Pie =

Children's poetry book by Dennis Lee

- Alligator Pie cover
- Author: Dennis Lee
- Illustrator: Frank Newfeld
- Cover artist: Frank Newfeld
- Language: English
- Subject: Poetry
- Genre: Children's
- Publisher: Macmillan Publishers
- Publication date: 1974
- Publication place: Canada
- Media type: Print
- Pages: 64
- ISBN: 978-1-55263-338-0
- OCLC: 46617830
- Preceded by: Civil Elegies and Other Poems
- Followed by: Nicholas Knock and Other People

Alligator Pie, first published in 1974, is a book of children's poetry written by Dennis Lee and illustrated by Frank Newfeld. It won the Book of the Year award from the Canadian Library Association in 1975. The book had multiple adaptations and led to Lee being named "Canada's Father Goose".

== Poems ==
- Alligator Pie
- Wiggle to the Laundromat
- Singa Songa
- Bouncing Song
- Street Song
- Mumbo, Jumbo
- Willaby Wallaby woo
- Lying on Things
- Rattlesnake Skipping Song
- Bed Song
- In Kamloops
- Billy Batter
- Ookpik
- Bump on Your Thumb
- The Special Person
- Like a Giant in a Towel
- Flying Out of Holes
- William Lyon Mackenzie King
- Tony Baloney
- Skyscraper
- Tricking
- I Found a Silver Dollar
- If You Should Meet
- Higgledy Piggeldy
- Thinking in Bed
- Nicholas Grouch
- Psychapoo
- On Tuesdays I Polish my Uncle
- The Fishes of Kempenfelt Bay
- Kahshe or Chicoutimi
- Tongue Twister
- The Hockey Game
- Peter Rabbit
- The Friends
- The Sitter and the Butter and the Better Batter Fritter
- Windshield Wipers

== Publication ==
I wrote Alligator Pie one day riding on a bike where we lived. My feet went around the pedals of the bike, and I started hearing these nutty words. Alligator Pie.

— Dennis Lee

One of his daughters wanted to be read a poem before she went to sleep and Lee "knew lots of nursery rhymes but none of them seemed right for a small Canadian about to go off to sleep" which contributed to him writing the collection. The first people to listen to the poems were Lee's two daughters, who did not like that the poems had no pictures although they liked the "silly words". It took Lee nine years to finish the book. It was published in 1974 by Macmillan Publishers and Frank Newfeld illustrated the poems. The poetry has a "Canadian context".

== Adaptations ==
Theatre Passe Muraille has produced stage adaptations of the collection since 1974. The plays were performed by "weaving the characters and stories together with bits of dialogue, music and movement." The Vancouver East Cultural Centre held the Theatre Passe Muraille's play in December 1984, and the organization invited children in the Lower Mainland to send in their own Alligator Pie art. The submissions could be from children in preschool to 6th grade with any type of two-dimensional art being accepted.

In 1991, Alligator Pie was made into a short film with puppeteering by Jani Lauzon. CBC Television played the film on its evening Family Hour programming block in 1992. The film is mostly in live action, but it also has claymation and puppets. The Times Colonist said, "It's a masterful adaptation of Lee's verse woven together to form an entire narrative." The film was released on VHS in 1991. It was released on DVD in the 10 Movie Kid's Pack Volume 3 by Echo Bridge Home Entertainment in 2011.

A 2012 theatrical adaptation was created by Ins Choi, Gregory Prest, Raquel Duffy, Ken MacKenzie and Mike Ross. The quintet received ensemble Dora Mavor Moore Award nominations for Outstanding New Play and Outstanding Direction in the Theatre for Young Audiences division in 2013.

In 2013, celebrities in Canada read the poem Alligator Pie which was edited into a single video. The celebrities included Sarah McLachlan, Carly Rae Jepsen, Steve Nash, and Elisha Cuthbert. The video was on Amazon's Canada website first while sending one dollar donations from individual sales of Lee's books to the TD Canadian Children's Book Week. The promotion was to "send 30 authors, illustrators, and storytellers to schools, libraries, bookstores, and community centers across Canada." It was later released on YouTube and Facebook by HarperCollins Canada.

Soulpepper Theatre Company held a musical production on stage at the Pershing Square Signature Center in 2017. The play was 55 minutes long, not including the intermission. Deb Miller of DC Metro Theater Arts said, "Soulpepper’s Alligator Pie reminds us that truly great children’s theater is great theater for all ages, so whether you’re young, or young at heart, you can’t help but love the inventiveness, enthusiasm, and talent of this superb company and the joyful tone of this delectable show."

== Reception ==
The book's success led to Lee being named "Canada's Father Goose". The majority of children's books that are published in Canada are "classified as either pre- or post-Alligator Pie". Before Alligator Pie was published, barely any children's poetry by Canadian authors was released in Canada. The book also gave Canadian authors "the newly found confidence" to "celebrate" their country. It won the Book of the Year award from the Canadian Library Association in 1975.

== Notes ==
- Lee, Dennis; Frank Newfeld (1974). Alligator Pie. Macmillan Publishers of Canada. ISBN 978-1-55263-338-0.
