= Susan Perly =

Canadian journalist and fiction writer

- Occupations: Writer, journalist
- Spouse: Dennis Lee
- Writing career
- Period: 1980s–present
- Notable works: Love Street, Death Valley

Susan Perly is a Canadian journalist and fiction writer, whose novel Death Valley was a longlisted nominee for the 2016 Scotiabank Giller Prize. A longtime journalist for CBC Radio, she was a producer for Morningside who became best known for her Letters from Latin America series of reports from war zones in Central and South America in the early 1980s, she later created a similar series of reports, Letters from Baghdad, for the network during the 1990 Gulf War. She was also a producer of documentaries for the network's Sunday Morning.

She began publishing short stories in the late 1980s, winning second prize in the short story section of the CBC Literary Awards in 1988. Her first novel, Love Street, was published in 2001, and Death Valley followed in 2016.

She is the daughter of Al and Belle Perly, the founders of the Toronto-based map company Perly's Maps. She is married to poet Dennis Lee.
