= John Newlove (poet) =

Canadian poet (1938–2003)

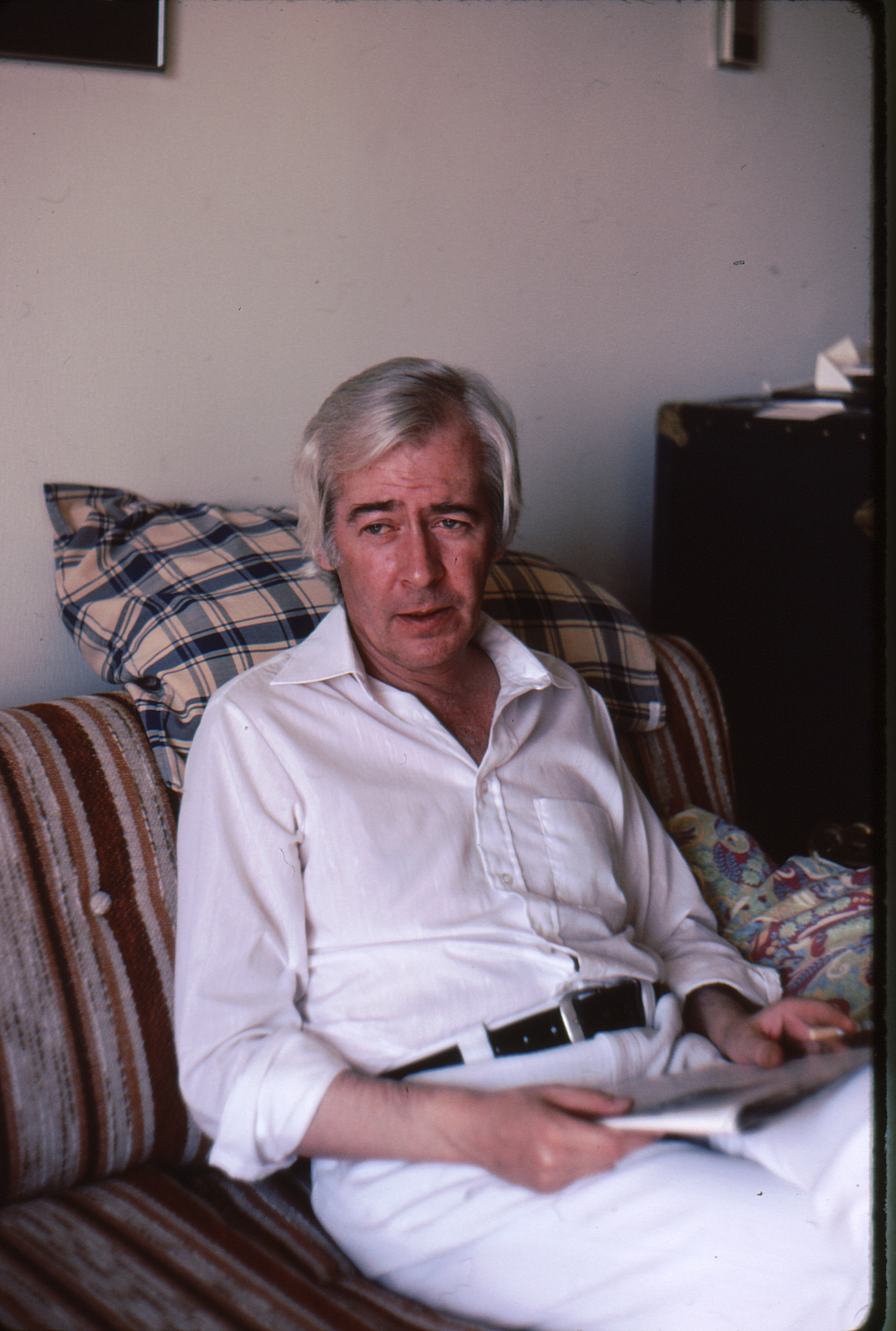
John Newlove

John Newlove (June 13, 1938 – December 23, 2003) was a Canadian poet who was considered to be one of the dominant voices of prairie poetry, though he lived most of his adult life in British Columbia and Ontario.

== Life ==
Born in Regina, Saskatchewan, Newlove lived in a variety of small Saskatchewan towns, in particular Kamsack. He attended the University of Saskatchewan for a year, worked briefly as a social worker, a teacher and at a radio station before embarking on a cross-Canada trip which eventually landed him in Vancouver, British Columbia.

He came to prominence in the 1960s as various collections of his poetry were published to critical acclaim. He left Vancouver in May 1967 and took his family to Deep Springs College in California where composer friend Barney Childs was a professor. After several more moves, he and his family ended up in Toronto by 1970 where he worked as senior editor for McClelland and Stewart. It was during this period that he won the 1972 Governor General's Award for "Lies."

Various writer-in-residence stints followed his 1974 departure from McCelland and Stewart, including at Concordia University in Montreal, the University of Toronto and University of Western Ontario in London. He lived for several years in Regina in the early 1980s where he served as writer-in-residence at the public library, then in Nelson, British Columbia, where he taught at David Thompson University. Finally, he moved to Ottawa in 1986 and took a position as an editor with the federal Office of the Commissioner of Official Languages; he would spend the rest of his life in that city.

His 1986 collection, The Night the Dog Smiled, was short-listed for that year's English language poetry Governor General's Award, and he won the 1984 Saskatchewan Writers' Guild Founders Award.

Newlove suffered a stroke in 2001 and died in 2003.

Newlove was the subject of two documentaries: New Canadian Writers: John Newlove (1971) which was broadcast on TVO, and What to Make of It All? The Life and Poetry of John Newlove (2006) which was broadcast on Bravo! in 2007. His letters were selected, edited, and published by J.A. Weingarten (The Weather and the Words: The Selected Letters of John Newlove, 1963-2003) in 2025.

== Bibliography ==
- Grave Sirs: Poems (1962)
- Elephants, Mothers & Others (1963)
- Moving in Alone (1965)
- "Notebook Pages" (1966)
- "What They Say" (1967)
- Black Night Window (1968)
- The Cave (1970)
- Lies (1972), winner of the 1972 Governor General's Award for Poetry
- The Fat Man: Selected Poems (1962–1972) (1977)
- The Green Plain (1981)
- The Night the Dog Smiled (1986), nominated for a 1986 Governor General's Award and the Dorothy Livesay Poetry Prize
- Apology for Absence: Selected Poems 1962–1992 (1993)
- A Long Continual Argument: The Selected Poems of John Newlove (2007)

== See also ==
- Canadian literature
- Canadian poetry
- List of Canadian poets
