= Seaton Village =

- Neighbourhood
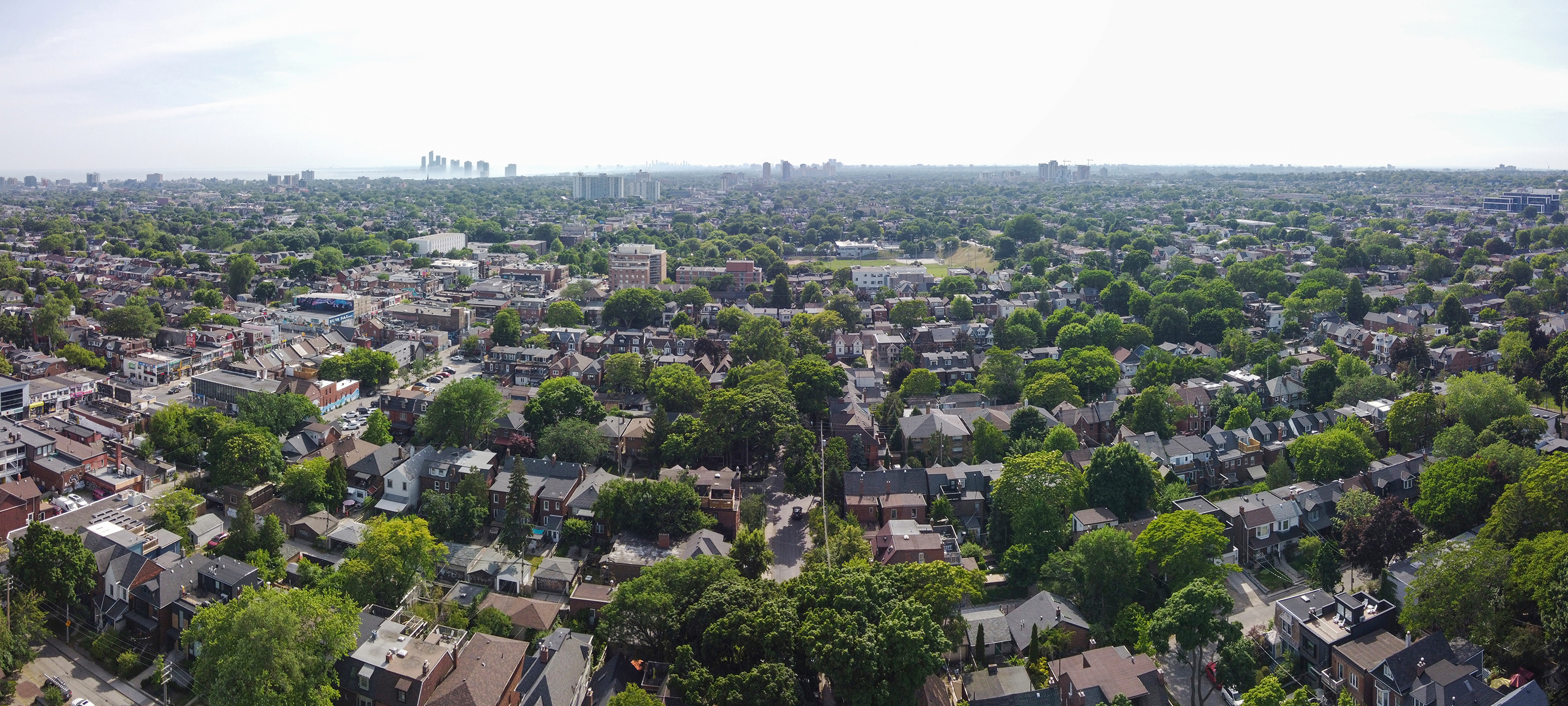
- Aerial view of Seaton Village in 2022

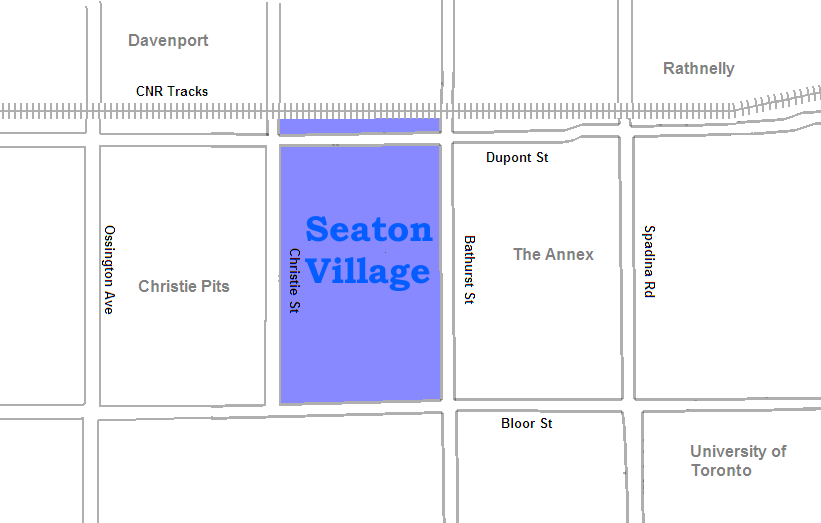
- Vicinity

- Location within Toronto
- Coordinates: 43.668°N 79.416°W
- Country: Canada
- Province: Ontario
- City: Toronto

Government
  - MP: Chrystia Freeland (University—Rosedale)
  - MPP: Jessica Bell (University-Rosedale)
  - Councillor: Dianne Saxe (Ward 11 University—Rosedale)

Area
  - Total: 0.618 km^{2} (0.239 sq mi)

Population (2021)
  - Total: 5,358
  - Density: 8,670/km^{2} (22,500/sq mi)

Seaton Village is a neighbourhood and former village located west of Downtown Toronto in Toronto, Ontario, Canada. It is named after John Colborne, 1st Baron Seaton, Lieutenant-Governor of Upper Canada from 1828 to 1836. Bloor Street borders Seaton Village to the south, the Canadian Pacific Railway tracks to the north, Christie Street to the west, and Bathurst Street to the east. Officially, it is an enclave within the Annex neighbourhood, as defined by the City of Toronto. It is sometimes referred to as the West Annex. While Seaton Village shares several characteristics with the Annex, it is often perceived as a quieter, family-oriented neighbourhood. The Koreatown shopping district is at its southern border.

== Character ==
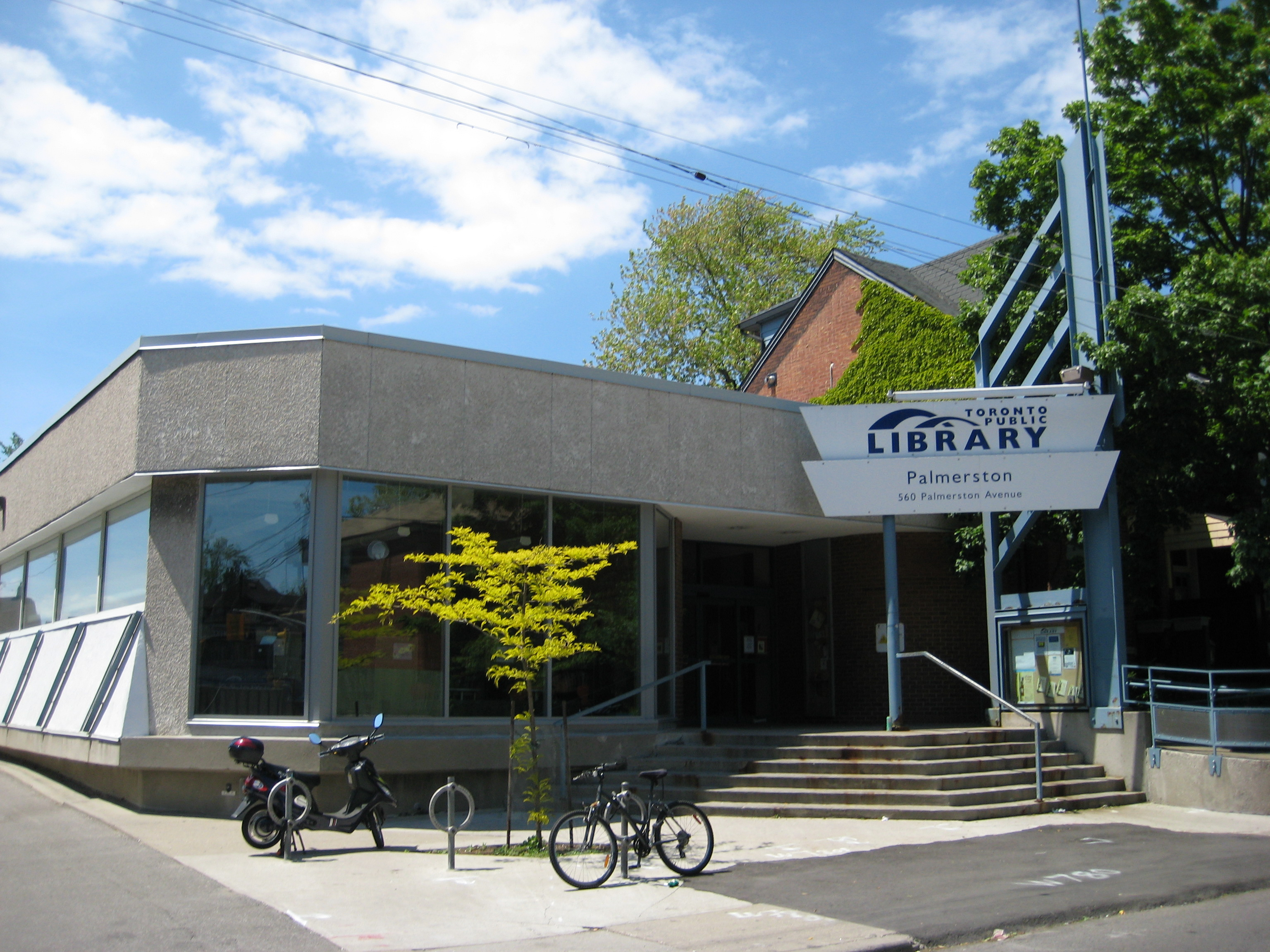
The Palmerston branch of the Toronto Public Library in Seaton Village

The area is primarily semi-detached single-family homes dating to the start of the 20th century. Most are either of solid brick construction, while some have a brick facade. Most of the trees planted at the same time as the houses were built are still standing. One unique home is located on Clinton Street. The house is almost completely covered with shells, marbles, and circular "woodcakes" cut from billiards cues.

Vermont Square Park is near the centre of Seaton Village. The park has a playground that was rebuilt in 2012, as well as off-leash dog park hours. St. Albans Boys and Girls club and the Bill Bolton hockey arena are also located in the park.

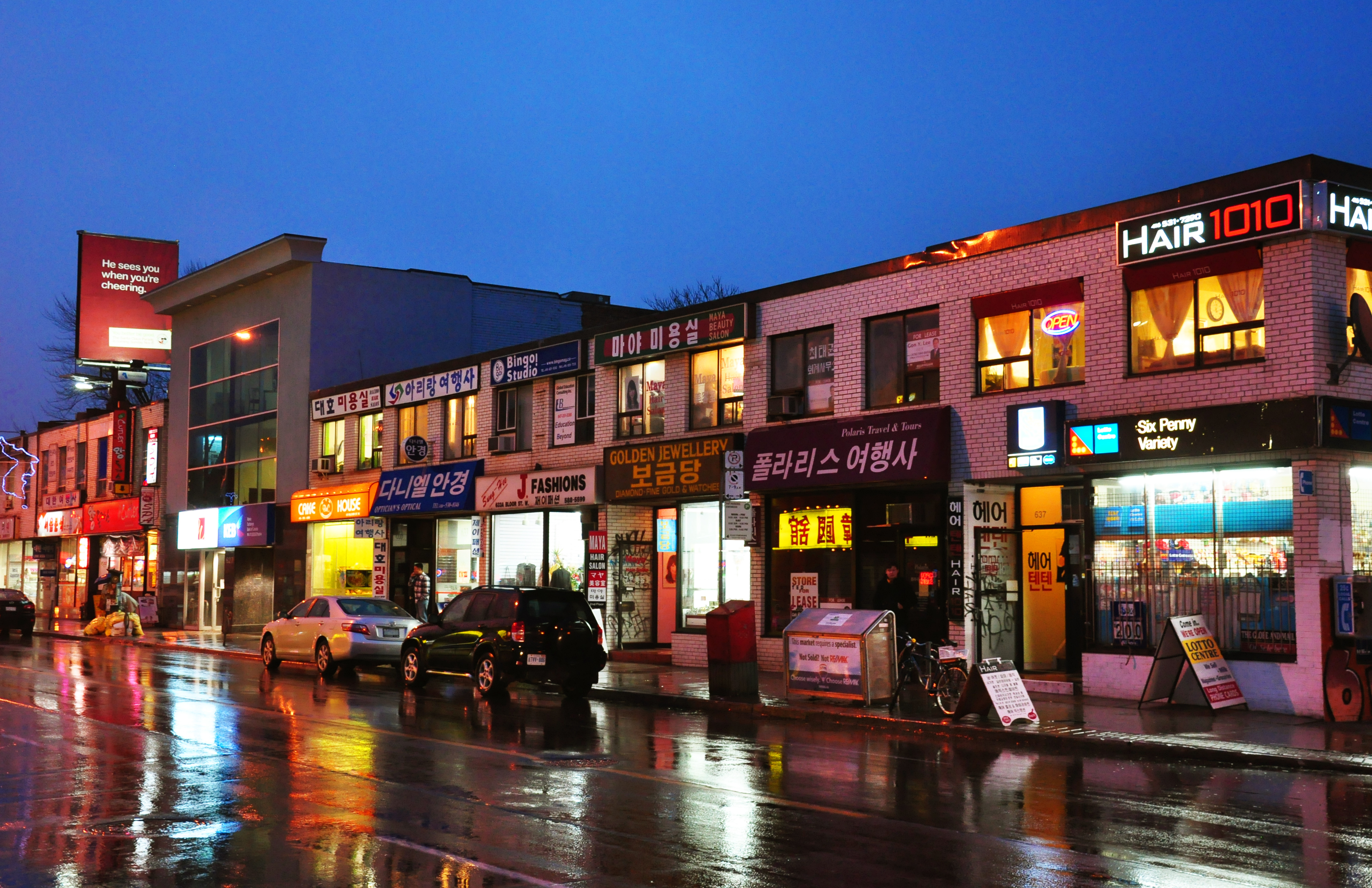
The ethnic enclave of Koreatown is located on Seaton Village's southern boundary, at Bloor Street.

There are also several small businesses located along Dupont Street. Karma Co-op, a co-operatively run health food store, is hidden down a laneway (officially named Karma Lane in 2014) and has operated in the area since 1972.

Seaton Village is represented in the House of Commons of Canada as part of the University—Rosedale electoral district. It is described in the Ontario Legislative Assembly as part of the Trinity—Spadina constituency.

It is served by two Toronto Transit Commission (TTC) subway stations: Bathurst and Christie. Buses run north from both stations, as well as along Dupont.

Seaton Village is bounded to the south by Bloor Street. Nearly the entirety of Seaton Village's portion of Bloor Street is occupied by a Korean ethnic enclave known as Koreatown. Before the influx of Korean immigrants in the 1980s, this section of Bloor Street was populated by people from Central and South America.

== Demographics ==
Historical population
Year	Pop.	±%
2006	5,259	—
2011	5,634	+7.1%
2016	5,652	+0.3%
2021	5,358	−5.2%

In the 2016 Canadian census, Seaton Village was covered by census tract 0093.00. According to that census, the neighbourhood has 5,652 residents. Average income is $167,014, close to the average for the Toronto CMA. The ten most common languages spoken at home, after English, are:

1. Portuguese - 5.0%
2. Italian - 3.5%
3. Korean - 2.0%
4. Cantonese - 1.6%
5. Unspecified Chinese - 1.5%
6. Greek - 1.4%
7. Spanish - 0.8%
8. French - 0.6%
9. Hungarian - 0.5%
10. Polish - 0.5%

== Notable persons ==
Seaton Village is the former home of Canadian poet and children's author Dennis Lee, Oscar-winning (for Chicago) sound engineer David Lee (no relation, now deceased), and sociologist Barry Wellman. It is the current home of musician Charles Spearin, professor and author Jordan Peterson once lived in neighbourhood, and songwriter/performer Nancy White.

Seaton Village was also where Meghan Markle, UK's Duchess of Sussex, lived in a rented house at 10 Yarmouth Gardens while filming the TV series Suits. She moved out in late November 2017 after work on the seventh season had been completed. Prince Harry, Duke of Sussex was a visitor to this house during the time Markle lived here.
