= Dennis Lee (author) =

Canadian poet, teacher, editor, and critic

Dennis Lee OC
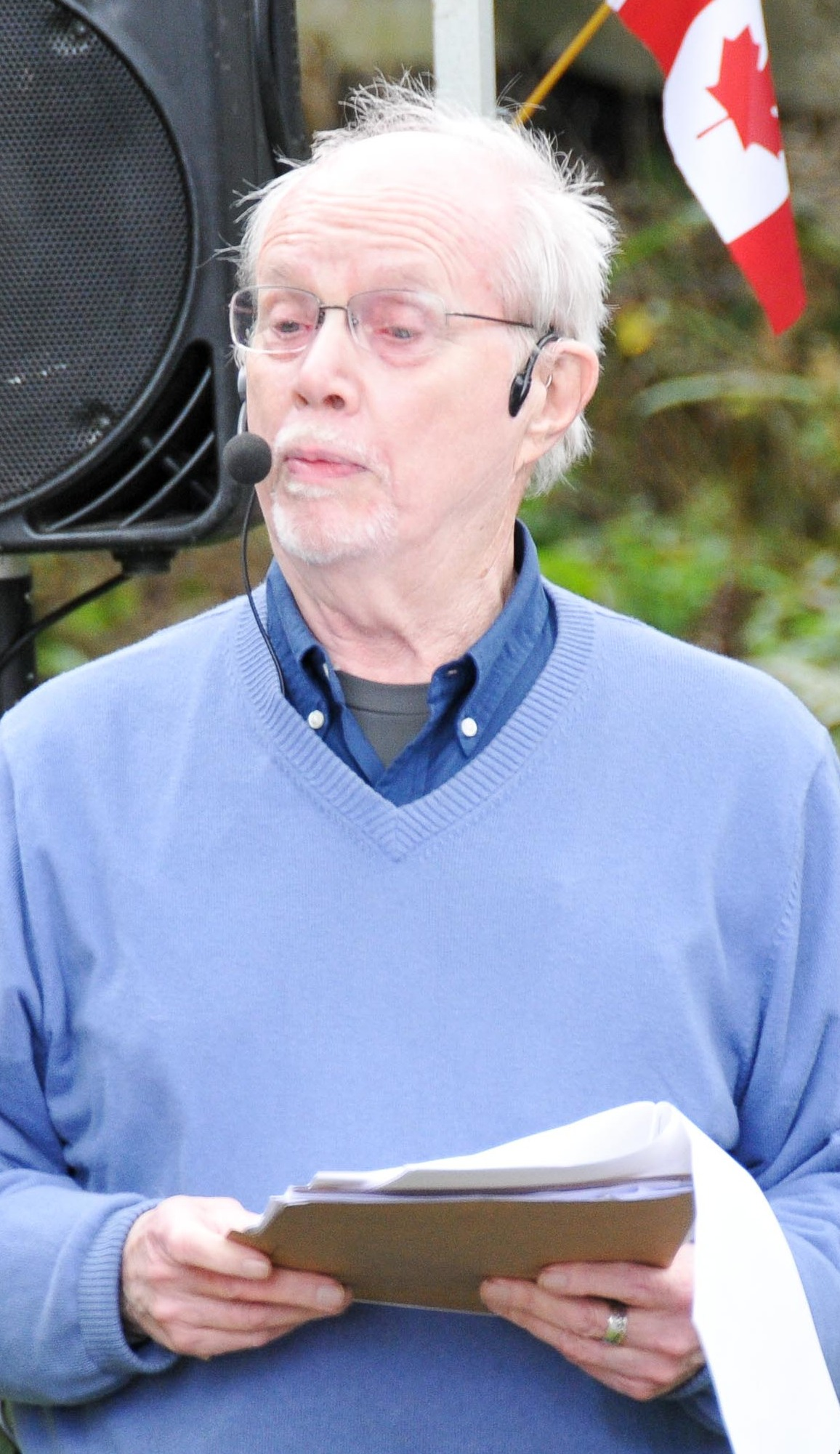
- Lee at the Eden Mills Writers' Festival in 2018
- Born: Dennis Beynon Lee; August 31, 1939 (age 87); Toronto, Ontario, Canada
- Education: Master of Arts, English
- Alma mater: University of Toronto
- Spouse: Susan Perly
- Writing career
- Genres: Poetry, essays
- Notable works: Civil Elegies, The Gods, The Ice Cream Store, Alligator Pie
- Notable awards: Governor General's Award, Order of Canada

Dennis Beynon Lee OC (born August 31, 1939) is a Canadian poet, teacher, editor, and critic born in Toronto, Ontario. He is also a children's writer, well known for his book of children's rhymes, Alligator Pie.

== Life ==
After attending high school at the University of Toronto Schools, Lee received bachelor's and master's degrees in English from the University of Toronto, where he coauthored articles in Acta Victoriana with Margaret Atwood. He taught English at the University's Victoria College from 1963 until 1967, at which time he became 'resource person' for Rochdale College.

Also in 1967, Lee co-founded House of Anansi Press with Dave Godfrey, and served as its editorial director until 1972. From 1974 to 1979 he was a consulting editor for Macmillan of Canada.

He was a writer in residence at Trent University in 1975, and at the University of Toronto in 1978-1979.

He is married to Susan Perly, a writer and former Canadian Broadcasting Corporation journalist.

== Writing ==
In 1967 House of Anansi published Lee's first book of poetry, Kingdom of Absence, "a sequence of 43 sonnet variations." Lee followed that up the next year with a long meditative poem, "Civil Elegies". (Civil Elegies and Other Poems, a revised version of that work collected with some newer poetry, won Lee the Governor General's Award in 1972.)

Lee began writing for children as part of his goal of "Reclaiming language and liberating imagination"; his poems are about the language and activities of the daily lives of children, expanded into the realm of imaginary play and fantasy. His best known work is the rhymed Alligator Pie (1974).

Lee wrote the lyrics to the theme song of the 1980s television show Fraggle Rock and, with composer Philip Balsam, many of the other songs for that show. A number of the songs were released on the albums Fraggle Rock: Music and Magic, in 1993, and Jim Henson's Muppets present Fraggle Rock, in 1984. The second album was nominated for a Grammy Award, which it won jointly with Shel Silverstein's Where the Sidewalk Ends. Balsam and Lee also wrote the songs for the television special The Tale of the Bunny Picnic. Lee is co-writer of the story for the film Labyrinth.

"On the adult level," says The Canadian Encyclopedia, "roots and play (including lovemaking) are further explored in Part I of The Gods (1979). Part 2, The Death of Harold Ladoo (1976), is an elegy for Lee's friend, a writer murdered in 1973.... The poem also meditates on the roles of mystical epiphanies and of artistic creation in its attempts to come to term with the problems of the contemporary world."

Lee is also the co-editor of The University Game (1968, with H. Edelman), "in which he calls for freedom from inhibiting educational institutions" a la Rochdale; and the author of Savage Fields: An Essay in Literature and Cosmology (1977), which "explores the interrelationship between 'earth' and 'world'—i.e. nature and civilization, or instinct and consciousness—all with particular application to a critical analysis of works by Michael Ondaatje and Leonard Cohen."

Alasdair Gray adapted a line from Lee's poem Civil Elegies into 'Work as if you live in the early days of a better nation' into a slogan Gray has become known by, inscribed on Scottish Parliament's Canongate Wall.

== Recognition ==
In addition to his 1972 Governor General's Award, Lee twice won the CACL Bronze Medal for a children's book: in 1974 for Alligator Pie, and in 1977 for Garbage Delight. He also won the Vicky Metcalf Award, for body of work for children, in 1986, and the Mr. Christie's Book Award (for The Ice Cream Store) in 1991.

In 1993, Lee was made an Officer of the Order of Canada. In 1995 he received an honorary doctorate from Trent University, and won a Toronto Arts Award for Lifetime Achievement.

In 2001 Lee became Toronto's first Poet Laureate, serving in that position until 2004.

In 2009, Lee received an honorary doctorate from Victoria College in the University of Toronto.

In 2011 the city of City of Toronto named a playground in Seaton Village to honour Lee, who lives in the neighbourhood.

== Publications ==
=== Poetry ===
- Kingdom of Absence. Toronto: House of Anansi Press, 1967.
- Civil Elegies. Toronto: Anansi, 1968.
- Civil Elegies and Other Poems. Toronto: Anansi, 1972.
- Not Abstract Harmonies But. Vancouver: Kanchenjunga Press, 1974. (Chapbook)
- The Death of Harold Ladoo. Vancouver: Kanchenjunga Press, 1976. (Chapbook)
- The Gods. Vancouver: Kanchenjunga Press, 1978. (Chapbook)
- The Gods. Toronto: McClelland and Stewart, 1979.
- The Difficulty of Living on Other Planets. Toronto: Macmillan, 1987. Illus. Alan Daniel.
- Riffs. London, Ont.: Brick Books, 1993.
- Nightwatch: New & Selected Poems 1968-1996. Toronto: McClelland and Stewart, 1996.
- Un. Toronto: Anansi, 2003.
- So cool. Dennis Lee; illustrations by Maryann Kovalski. Toronto : Key Porter, 2004.
- The Bard of the Universe. Kentville, NS: Gaspereau Press, 2007.
- YesNo. Toronto: Anansi, 2007.
- Testament. Toronto: Anansi, 2012.

=== Children's poetry ===
- Wiggle to the Laundromat. Toronto: New Press, 1970. Ill. Charles Pachter.
- Nicholas Knock and Other People. Toronto: Macmillan of Canada, 1974. Ill. Frank Newfeld.
- Alligator Pie. Toronto: Macmillan of Canada, 1974. Ill. Frank Newfeld.
- Garbage Delight. Toronto: Macmillan, 1977. Ill. Frank Newfeld
- The Ordinary Bath. Toronto: Magook, 1979. Ill. Jon McKee.
- Jelly Belly. Toronto: Macmillan, 1983. Ill. Juan Wijngaard.
- Lizzy's Lion. Toronto: Stoddart Kids, 1984. Ill. Marie-Louise Gay.
- The Dennis Lee Big Book. Toronto: Gage, 1985. Ill. Barbara Klunder.
- The Ice Cream Store. Toronto: HarperCollins, 1991. Ill. David McPhail.
- Dinosaur Dinner (with a Slice of Alligator Pie). New York: Random House, 1997. Selected by Jack Prelutsky. Ill. Debbie Tilley.
- Bubblegum Delicious - 2000
- The cat and the wizard. Dennis Lee; illustrations by Gillian Johnson. Toronto : Key Porter Books, 2001.
- Silverly/ Good Night, Good Night. Toronto: Key Porter Books, 2006. Ill. Nora Hilb.
- Skyscraper. Toronto: Key Porter Books, 2007. Ill. Nora Hilb.
- The Kitty Ran Up the Tree. Toronto: Key Porter Books, 2007. Ill. Nora Hilb.
- This Little Puppy. Toronto: Key Porter Books, 2008. Ill. Nora Hilb.
- Willoughby Wallaby Woo. Toronto: Key Porter Books, 2006. Ill. Nora Hilb.
- Alligator Stew: Favourite Poems. Toronto: Key Porter Books, 2005. Ill. Rege.
- Living and Learning with Children: Three Hundred One Activities for 3 to 8-Year Olds. New Jersey: New Horizons Publishers. 1981. Ill. Paula Jorde Bloom.
- Ping and Pong. New York: HarperCollins, 1994. Ill. David McPhail.
- Rocking Chair. Toronto: Key Porter Books, 2006. Ill. Nora Hilb.
- So Cool. Toronto: Key Porter Books, 2004. Ill. Maryann Kovalski.
- The Dreadful Doings of Jelly Belly. Toronto: Key Porter Books, 2006. Ill. Nora Hilb.
- Zoomberry. New York: HarperCollins, 2016. Ill. Dušan Petričić.

=== Prose ===
- Savage Fields: An Essay in Literature and Cosmology. Toronto: Anansi, 1977.
- Cadence, Country, Silence: Writing in Colonial Space, in Cencrastus No. 4, Winter 1980-81, pp. 1 - 6, ISSN 0264-0856
- Reading Adonis. Toronto: Coach House Press, 1987. (Chapbook)
- Body Music. Toronto: Anansi, 1998.

=== Edited ===
- An Anthology of Verse. Edited by Lee and Roberta Charlesworth. Toronto: Oxford, 1964.
- The University Game. Essays Edited by Howard Adelman & Dennis Lee. Toronto: Anansi, 1968.
- T.O. Now; the Young Toronto Poets. Toronto: Anansi, 1968.
- The New Canadian Poets, 1970-1985. Toronto: McClelland & Stewart, 1985.

Except where noted, bibliographic information courtesy Canadian Poetry Online.

== Recordings ==
- Dennis Lee [selections].[Sound recording]. Toronto: High Barnet, 1970.
- Alligator Pie and Other Poems. [sound recording]. New York: Caedmon, 1978.

Preceded by None	Toronto Poets Laureate; 2001-2004	Succeeded by Pier Giorgio Di Cicco
