= Ins Choi =

Canadian actor and playwright

- Born: 1974 (age 51–52); South Korea
- Education: York University (BFA); University of Toronto (MTS)
- Occupations: Playwright, Screenwriter, Actor

Insub "Ins" Choi (Korean: 최인섭; RR: Choe Inseob) is a Canadian actor and playwright best known for his Dora Mavor Moore Award-nominated 2011 play Kim's Convenience and its subsequent TV adaptation.

Choi was born in South Korea and raised in Toronto, Ontario. He is a graduate of the theatre program at York University.

== Early life and education ==
Born Insub Choi in South Korea in 1974, Choi moved to Canada at the age of one and grew up in Scarborough, Ontario, which is now part of Toronto. His father was born in North Korea and "walked south" with his family as a child. Choi's mother grew up in South Korea, where she met and married her husband before emigrating to Canada with Choi and his two older sisters in 1975. His father worked as a pastor of an immigrant church in downtown Toronto that he owned and founded.

An immigration officer misspelled his name as "Insurp" and in Grade 9 Choi began using the name "Danny", inspired by John Travolta's character in Grease. When he attended the acting program at York University, he met other struggling Asian immigrants and began going by Ins, as a shortened form of his birth name.

In high school, Choi played various sports and performed in a school play. After school he worked at convenience stores owned by friends of his parents.

Choi attended North Toronto Collegiate Institute in the early 1990s. He graduated from York University's theatre program in 1998. His first application to the fine arts program at York was rejected. He completed a Master of Theological Studies at Wycliffe College, University of Toronto, graduating in 2002. He credits his success to his studies at Wycliffe, which he believes made him a better writer.

== Career ==
Following his graduation from York University, Choi worked with fu-GEN, a Toronto-based Asian Canadian theatre company, which helped him figure out what he wanted to portray to an audience through his work. He stated that working with fu-GEN showed him "who [he] really was and what [he] really wanted to say mattered in the world of art," and it was there that he first envisioned Kim's Convenience, a play that eventually became a successful television series. He is credited as a co-creator, producer, and main screenwriter on the series, which ended after its fifth season.

In 2012, he collaborated with Gregory Prest, Raquel Duffy, Ken MacKenzie and Mike Ross on a theatrical adaptation of Dennis Lee's children's poetry book Alligator Pie, for which they received ensemble Dora nominations for Outstanding New Play and Outstanding Direction in the Theatre for Young Audiences division in 2013.

Choi's 2013 one-man show, The Subway Stations of the Cross, was inspired by the homeless and mentally ill men he met in parks and public spaces across Toronto. He has also created the show, The Beats and the Breaks, about hip-hop, as well as The KJV: The Bible Show. In 2018 and 2019 Choi toured with his stage show Ins Choi: Songs, Stories and Spoken Word.

== Works ==
- Kim's Convenience (2011)
- The KJV: The Bible Show (2011)
- Alligator Pie (2012)
- The Beats and the Breaks (2012)
- The Subway Stations of the Cross (2015)
- Ins Choi: Songs, Stories and Spoken Word (2018)
- Bad Parent (2022)
- Son of a Preacherman (2026)

== Personal life ==
Ins Choi married Mari in March 2005, and together they have two children and reside in Toronto. Like his father who was a preacher, he also follows the Christian faith.
