= Min Reyes =

Min Reyes is a Canadian political commentator, blogger and tweeter active since 2010. She assisted in organizing and being hailed as the de facto spokesperson by Canadian media for the Occupy movement protest known as Occupy Vancouver in Vancouver, British Columbia, Canada and holds a B.A. in Communications from Simon Fraser University.
