= Frank Newfeld =

Canadian artist and educator

Frank Newfeld CM RCA is a Czech born, Canadian book designer, illustrator, art director and educator.

He is known for designing over 700books, winning 160 plus international awards for his contributions.

He is a former Vice-President of Publishing at McClelland & Stewart, Head of the Illustration Program at Sheridan College and Co-founder/President of the Society of Typographic Designers of Canada (now Design Professionals of Canada).

He is a Fellow of Design Professionals of Canada and a Member of the Royal Canadian Academy of Arts. In 2015, Newfeld was appointed to the Order of Canada.

Newfeld has created three children’s books, two of them published by Oxford University Press and one by Groundwood Books (Douglas & McIntyre). In 2008 his book Drawing on Type was published by Porcupine's Quill. He is also known for illustrating the children's book Alligator Pie.
