= Kim's Convenience (play) =

2011 play by Ins Choi

- Written by: Ins Choi
- Characters: Appa; Umma; Janet; Jung; Rich; Mike; Alex; Mr. Lee
- Setting: Regent Park, Toronto

Premiere
- Date: July 6, 2011
- Place: Toronto Fringe Festival

Kim's Convenience by Ins Choi is a play about a family-run Korean-owned convenience store in Toronto's Regent Park neighbourhood. It debuted on July 6, 2011, at the Toronto Fringe Festival, having secured a slot by winning the Festival's New Play Contest. The play sold out its seven-show run at the 200-seat Bathurst Street Theatre and won the Patron's Pick award that granted them an additional eighth show, which sold out in three hours. As well as writing the show, Choi directed the run and played the role of Jung, the protagonist's son.

In 2012, Kim's Convenience was remounted by Soulpepper Theatre, under the direction of Weyni Mengesha, and became the most commercially successful production in the company's entire history. The production won two Toronto Theatre Critics awards in 2012: for Best Actor in a play, won by Paul Sun-Hyung Lee, and Best Canadian Play. It was also a nominee for the Dora Mavor Moore Award for Outstanding New Play in 2012.

The script was published by House of Anansi Press in 2012, and the play toured Canada from 2013 to 2016. In 2017, the show was performed Off-Broadway at the Pershing Square Signature Center as part of a month-long residency of Soulpepper productions.

In March 2015, CBC Television announced that a television series based on the play, also titled Kim's Convenience, was in development. Billed as the first Canadian TV show to feature an Asian cast of lead actors, Kim's Convenience was celebrated as an achievement in diversity in television. The first season of the series was filmed from June to August 2016, and produced by Thunderbird Films and Toronto's Soulpepper Theatre Company. It was broadcast in 13 half-hour episodes on CBC Television in fall 2016 and went on to run for five seasons, concluding in April 2021.

== Background ==
During the 1960s, there was a large amount of Korean immigration to Canada, with Koreans trying to create a better future for their families, a large percentage of whom settled in Toronto and opened convenience stores as a means of business. Ins Choi’s family were amongst the Korean natives who resided in Scarborough, Toronto; his father worked at his uncle’s convenience store called Kim’s Grocer, and Ins worked at his parents’ friends' convenience store after school.

The idea that became the play Kim’s Convenience was from a simple conversation Choi was having with a friend. As a member of Fu-GEN Asian Canadian Theatre Company’s play writing unit, he started writing the play partially based on the memories he had from Kim’s Grocer and on his experience working in other convenience stores. The Korean church assisted Choi by contributing $3,000 to help him complete the play. Kim’s Convenience was focused on the Korean natives who opened convenience stores in the 1980s in Toronto and the cultural differences between the parents and their Canadian-born children. Religion and family business are what guided Choi to write the play.

Choi says his main message in the play is for his audience to understand and respect the family-operated stores. He calls Kim’s Convenience his “love letter to [his] parents and to all first-generation immigrants who call Canada their home”. After five years, Choi completed the play and sent it to all the major theatre companies in Toronto but received multiple rejections. He later produced the play at the Toronto Fringe Festival, where it became recognized. Led by an all-Asian cast, the play was turned into the first Canadian TV show in 2016, that was led by an all-Asian cast as well.

== Synopsis ==
Mr. Kim (Appa) owns and runs his own business, Kim’s Convenience, in Toronto's Regent Park neighbourhood, with his wife Mrs. Kim (Umma). Mr. Kim hopes the store will provide a future for his daughter, Janet, who he hopes will take over the store from him when he retires; however, Janet has no interest in running the store and wishes to have a career as a photographer. Regent Park is being gentrified with new condos and developments and the potential that a Wal-Mart will open up and destroy Mr. Kim's business. Realtor Mr. Lee offers to purchase the store and property. The Kims' son, Jung, ran away from home when he was 16 after Appa had hit him and he was hospitalized for a few days. Everything seemed to go back to normal after Jung was released, until one day when Appa went to get money from the safe and found it—and Jung's room—empty. Since then, Appa hasn't spoken to Jung, though Umma maintains surreptitious contact with Jung by meeting him at church. It is not until the prodigal son returns and reconciles with his father that the future of Kim's Convenience is assured.

== Reception ==
The New York Times's Jesse Green's feelings towards Kim's Convenience were mixed. He mentioned that an audience was supposed to enjoy and like it, because it was relatable and the play was "likeable". Green said that the play was a bit sitcom but it felt real for him. He felt like the play was a little predictable but it was relatable in the end. As he was watching the play he realized that it was his story too.

Brad Wheeler said that the play has received several accolades for being authentic, funny and groundbreaking. He loves that it is the first of its kind featuring a Korean-Canadian family. Although trying their best to seem like a modern family, fully inducted to the new Canadian culture, this is not the truth in real sense. Even though the comedy took over most of the play, the play seeks to open a discussion on sensitive topics that are rarely discussed, centered on family.

== Original cast ==
=== Toronto Fringe Festival – July 2011 ===
Directed by Ins Choi. Performed at the Bathurst Street Theatre.

- Appa – Paul Sun-Hyung Lee
- Umma – Jean Yoon
- Janet – Esther Jun
- Jung – Ins Choi
- Rich, Mike, Alex, Mr. Lee – André Sills

=== Soulpepper Theatre production – January 2012 ===
Source: / National Tour - 2013

Directed by Weyni Mengesha. Soulpepper production performed at the Young Centre for the Performing Arts.

- Appa – Paul Sun-Hyung Lee
- Umma – Jean Yoon
- Janet – Esther Jun (Soulpepper, Calgary production of National Tour), Grace Lynn Kung (National Tour)
- Jung – Ins Choi
- Rich, Mike, Alex, Mr. Lee – Clé Bennett (Soulpepper), André Sills (National Tour)

=== Off-Broadway cast – July 2017 ===
Directed by Weyni Mengesha.

- Appa – Paul Sun-Hyung Lee
- Umma – Jean Yoon
- Janet – Rosie Simon
- Jung – Ins Choi
- Rich, Mike, Alex, Mr. Lee – Ronnie Rowe Jr.

=== London production – January 2024 ===
The play's European premiere, the London production is being performed at the Park Theatre with playwright Choi, who played Jung in the original production, returning as Appa. Esther Jun, who performed as Janet in the original production, is directing.

- Appa – Ins Choi
- Umma – Namju Go
- Janet – Jennifer Kim
- Jung – Brian Law
- Rich, Mike, Alex, Mr. Lee – Miles Mitchell

=== Soulpepper Theatre production – January 2025 ===
Directed by Weyni Mengesha.

- Appa – Ins Choi
- Umma – Esther Chung
- Janet – Kelly Seo
- Jung – Ryan Jinn
- Rich, Mike, Alex, Mr. Lee – Brandon McKnight

=== Olney Theatre Center – June 2025 ===
Directed by Aria Velz

- Appa – Stan Kang
- Umma – Tuyết Thị Phạm
- Janet – Justine "Icy" Moral
- Jung – Zion Jang
- Rich, Mike, Alex, Mr. Lee – Jonathan Del Palmer
