= Koreatown, Toronto =

Neighbourhood in Toronto, Ontario, Canada

- Neighbourhood
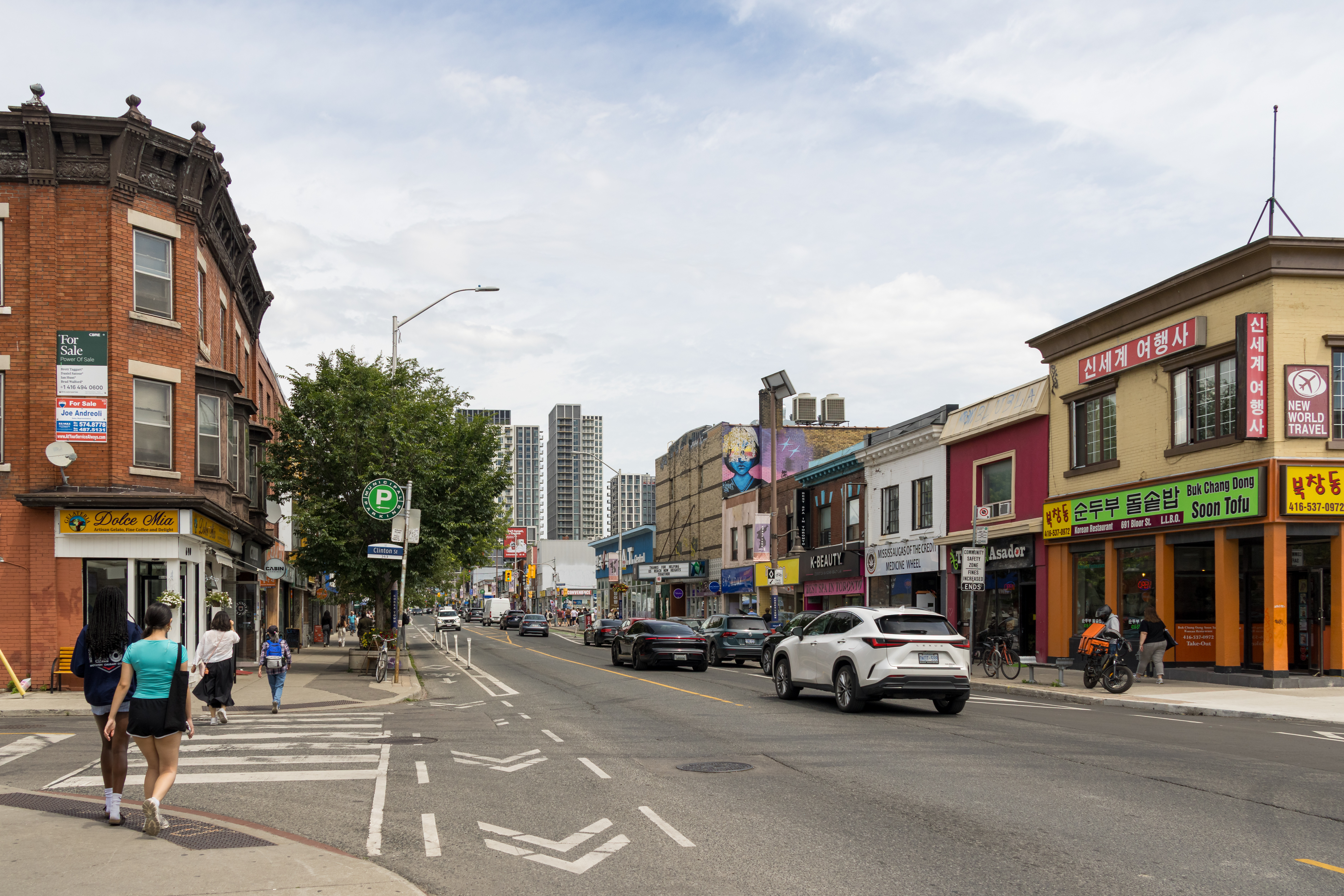
- Looking east along Bloor Street

- Location within Toronto
- Coordinates: 43°39′51″N 79°24′57″W
- Country: Canada
- Province: Ontario
- City: Toronto

Koreatown (Korean: 코리아타운) is an ethnic enclave within Seaton Village, and a neighbourhood of Toronto, Ontario, Canada. Located along Bloor Street between Christie and Bathurst Streets, the area is known for its Korean business and restaurants. The ethnic enclave developed during the 1970s, as the city experienced an influx of Korean immigrants settling in Toronto. Toronto has the largest single concentration of Koreans in Canada with 53,940 living in the city, according to the 2016 Canadian census.

In addition to the Koreatown in Seaton Village, the city also holds another cluster of Korean businesses and restaurants in the neighbourhood of Willowdale, informally referred to as Koreantown North, New Koreatown, and Uptown Koreatown. The cluster of Korean businesses in Willowdale is centred along Yonge Street, between Finch and Sheppard Avenue.

== History ==
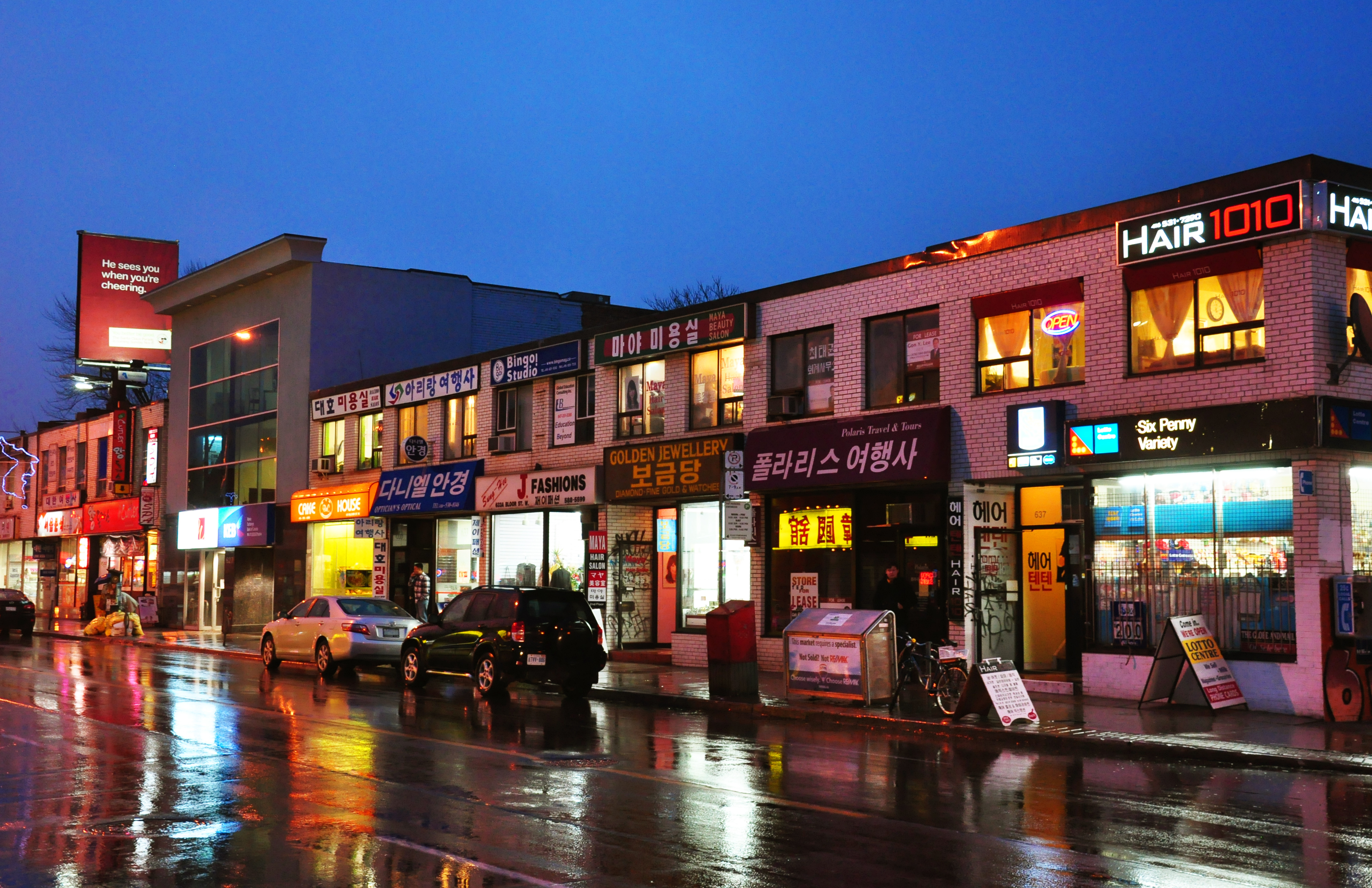
Korean businesses and restaurants along Bloor Street (2009)

The section of Bloor Street west of Bathurst Street was heavily populated by people from Central and South America prior to the influx of Korean immigrants in the late-1960s and 1970s. Prior to this influx, the Korean population in Toronto was approximately 100 in 1966. However, by the 1970s, the Korean population in the city grew to roughly 10,000, with most settling near Bloor Street.

The adoption of a more liberal immigration policy by the Canadian government in 1967 led to an influx of Korean immigrants, many of whom settled in the Toronto area. Many of them settled in the Bloor and Bathurst area, with a small Korean business neighbourhood developed along Bloor Street, centred on the intersection of Bloor and Manning Avenue. Restaurants, bakeries, gift shops, grocery stores, and travel agencies began to open up, most of which catered to the Korean-Canadian community. Today, although many Koreans work in the area, very few Koreans in fact live in Koreatown.

== Other Korean communities in Toronto ==
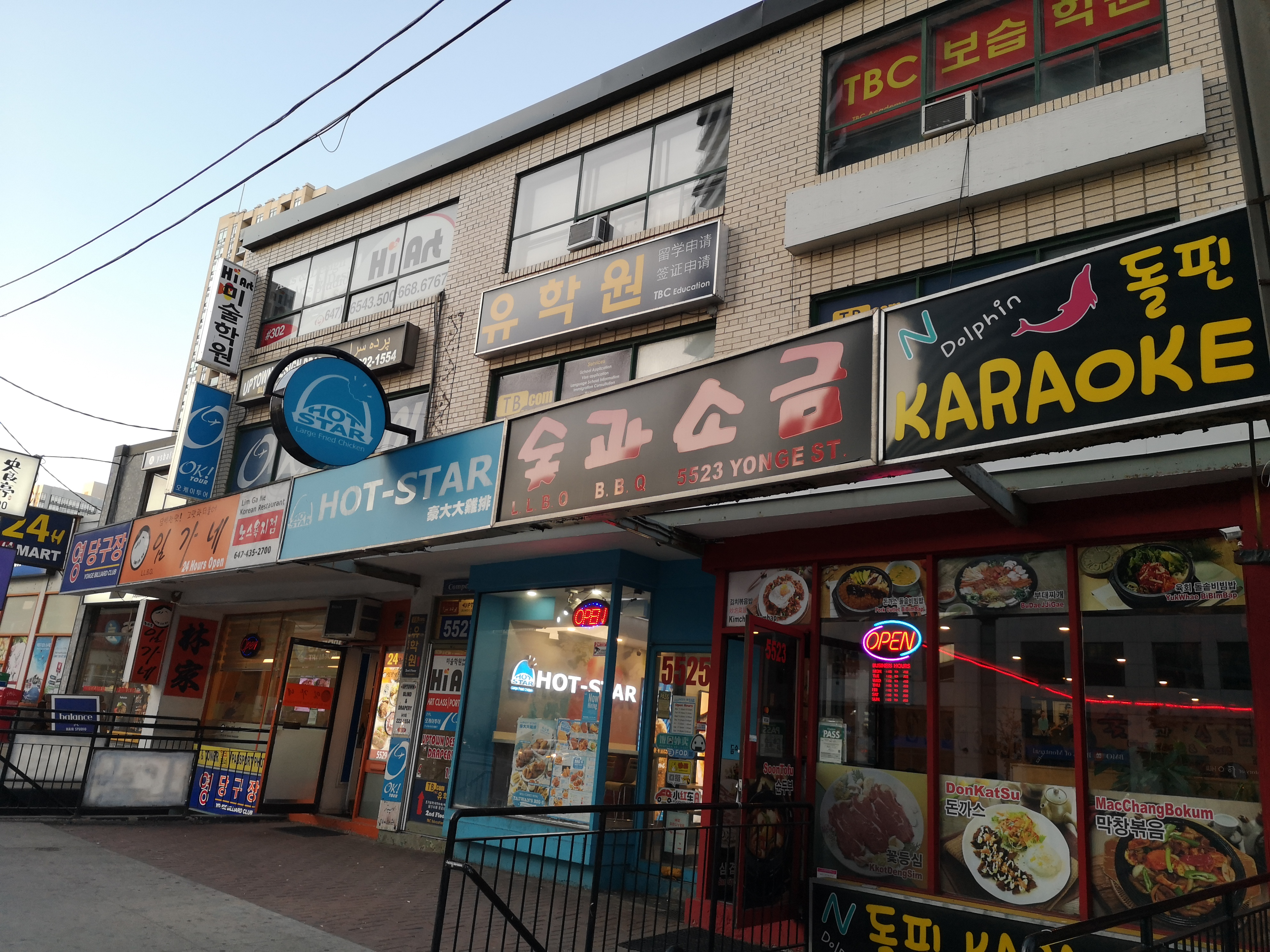
Korean businesses and restaurants along Yonge Street in Willowdale (2019)

A Korean community in the neighbourhood of Willowdale has also developed in recent decades, and has also been referred to as Koreantown North, new Koreatown, and uptown Koreatown. Of the 118,000 residents of Willowdale, more than 10,000 identified Korean as their first language in the Canada 2016 Census. Korean businesses and restaurants are centred around Yonge Street, stretching from Finch Avenue to Sheppard Avenue to the south. Koreans account for more than 13 per cent of the population in the strip of Yonge Street from Finch to Sheppard Avenue.

== See also ==
- Korean Canadians
