= List of Kim's Convenience episodes =

Kim's Convenience is a Canadian television sitcom that premiered on CBC Television in October 2016. The series depicts the Korean Canadian Kim family who run a convenience store in the Moss Park neighbourhood of Toronto: parents "Appa" (Paul Sun-Hyung Lee) and "Umma" (Jean Yoon) – Korean for "dad" and "mum" – along with their daughter Janet (Andrea Bang) and estranged son Jung (Simu Liu). Additional characters include Jung's friend and co-worker Kimchee (Andrew Phung) and his manager Shannon (Nicole Power). The series is based on Ins Choi's 2011 play of the same name.

Originally set to premiere on 4 October 2016, on CBC the series premiere was delayed to 11 October 2016, with back-to-back episodes, so it would not conflict with the Toronto Blue Jays' American League Wild Card Game. The first season consists of 13 half-hour episodes.

CBC announced on December 20, 2016, that it had renewed Kim's Convenience for a second season of 13 episodes. The second season premiered on 26 September 2017. On 12 March 2018, the cast of Kim's Convenience took to Facebook and Twitter to announce that there would be a third season. The third season began airing on 8 January 2019.

On 24 May 2018, just two months after announcing the third season renewal of the show, CBC announced that the show had also been renewed for a fourth season, which premiered on 7 January 2020. On 31 March 2020, it was announced that the show has been renewed for two more seasons, but on 8 March 2021, it was revealed that the show would end after the fifth season, due to the departure of the show's two co-creators.

== Series overview ==
Series	Episodes	Originally released	
Series	Episodes	First released	Last released
1	13	11 October 2016	27 December 2016
2	13	26 September 2017	19 December 2017
3	13	8 January 2019	2 April 2019
4	13	7 January 2020	31 March 2020
5	13	19 January 2021	13 April 2021

== Episodes ==
=== Season 1 (2016) ===
No. overall	No. in season	Title	Directed by	Written by	Original release date	CAN viewers (millions)
1	1	"Gay Discount"	Peter Wellington	Ins Choi & Kevin White	October 11, 2016	0.835
After being accused of homophobia, Appa creates a gay discount during Pride. Meanwhile, Umma tries to find a "cool Christian Korean boyfriend" for Janet.
2	2	"Janet's Photos"	Peter Wellington	Ins Choi & Kevin White	October 11, 2016	0.805
When Janet's photos start getting attention from admirers, Appa tries to prove he's a better photographer. Meanwhile, Jung decides to apply for a promotion at the car rental agency, to the dismay of Kimchee and Umma, though for different reasons. Jung ends up getting the promotion to be Assistant Manager.
3	3	"Ddong Chim"	Peter Wellington	Garry Campbell	October 18, 2016	0.749
Jung draws the wrong kind of attention from his boss when he gives Kimchee a ddong chim (Korean "wedgie") at work, which Kimchee takes exception to. Mr. Kim commissions Janet's friend, Gerald, to take his photo instead of asking Janet.
4	4	"Frank and Nayoung"	Dawn Wilkinson	Ins Choi & Kevin White	October 25, 2016	0.763
Mr. Kim is frustrated with Frank (Derek McGrath), a repairman who talks too much, while Janet's cousin Nayoung (Soo-Ram Kim) visits from Korea, challenging Janet's sense of what it means to be 'Korean.' Jung and Shannon get tickets to a Toronto Raptors game, but Jung starts to wonder if Shannon thinks it's a date.
5	5	"Wingman"	James Genn	Garry Campbell	November 1, 2016	N/A
Mr. Chin asks Mr. Kim to be his wingman on a date, which is fine until Mrs. Kim tags along. Janet asks Jung to help her fix a dripping pipe at the store, but the repair is interrupted by an intruder. After the intruder leaves, a police officer enters the store and mistakenly believes that Jung is the thief, and cuffs him. Her partner Alex (Michael Xavier) later arrives and vouches for Jung, as they were childhood friends. Alex becomes reacquainted with Janet, who both appear smitten with each other.
6	6	"Rude Kid"	James Genn	Sonja Bennett	November 15, 2016	N/A
Mr. Kim scolds Janet's professor's 5 year-old kid when he misbehaves in his store. Janet tries to stay in her teacher's good graces, but unintentionally upsets and offends her father. Jung discovers Kimchee is making extra money by moonlighting for a carsharing company, illicitly using Handy Car Rental cars. Shannon believes it is Terence who is responsible, and is thinking about firing him.
7	7	"Hapkido"	Dawn Wilkinson	Ins Choi	November 22, 2016	0.887
Janet takes a Hapkido class but Mr. Kim thinks he knows more than her teacher (Tommy Chang). Jung runs into Grace Lee (Eileen Li), an old flame; they both discover that their meeting was not accidental but part of a plan by their mothers to get them back together. Jung and Grace rekindle their high school romance.
8	8	"Service"	James Genn	Rebecca Kohler	November 29, 2016	0.878
Mr. and Mrs. Kim's relationship is tested when Mr. Kim offers the attractive new female pastor (Amanda Brugel) some free items from the store. Janet dates Jung's friend, Alex, and Jung pretends to be cool with it.
9	9	"Best Before"	James Genn	Story by : Kevin White and Ins Choi; Teleplay by : Anita Kapila	December 6, 2016	N/A
Mr. Kim tries to prove that "best before" dates mean nothing when Janet objects to his selling expired ravioli. Both Mr. Kim and Janet get sick from eating something. Mrs. Kim's serving up her homemade galbijjim at the church bazaar when a surprise visit by Jung forces her to admit that she's embarrassed by his troubled past.
10	10	"Janet's New Job"	Dawn Wilkinson	Anita Kapila	December 13, 2016	N/A
Janet is sick of working for free and finds a job at Handy Car Rental, putting Jung in a difficult position. While working there, she notices that Jung and Shannon are attracted to each other. Mr. Kim hires Gerald to work in the store, but makes Gerald nervous and clumsy whenever he is around. Mr. Kim ends up firing Gerald, and Janet agrees to come back as long as she is now paid and is allowed to take coffee breaks.
11	11	"Handyman"	Dawn Wilkinson	Kevin White	December 20, 2016	0.690
Mr. Kim fixes a broken toilet for Kimchee; Jung hides out with Shannon; when Edwin Carter (Kevin Bundy), an old acquaintance and dancing partner of Mrs. Kim's drops by, Janet believes there's more to their prior relationship. Edwin and Mrs. Kim demonstrate their dance moves to Janet, but Mr. Kim walks in, and they stop dancing and Edwin soon leaves.
12	12	"Appa's Lump"	Peter Wellington	Anita Kapila	December 27, 2016	0.805
Mr. Kim finds a lump on his back and goes in for a biopsy. Janet wins an award at school. Shannon brings Jung to a work event which may also be a date, when he learns of his dad's surgery and leaves to go to hospital. Because her mother and father are at the hospital, Janet decides to skip the awards celebration and keep the store open. Mr. Kim returns home and appears to be fine, but doesn't seem to remember Jung's hospital visit to see him.
13	13	"Family Singing Contest"	Peter Wellington	Ins Choi & Kevin White	December 27, 2016	0.938
Janet signs a lease with Gerald and Semira but doesn't know how to break the news to her parents. Mrs Kim really wants her family to beat the Parks at the church's family singing festival, but Jung is reluctant to join them while Janet hopes entering the contest will put Umma in a good mood to receive her news; Mr. Kim gets attention for his new SUV. Jung is surprised to learn that Shannon has a new boyfriend, Alejandro, (Marco Grazzini), whom she brings to the church festival, resulting in Jung realizing he may have feelings for her.

=== Season 2 (2017) ===
No. overall	No. in season	Title	Directed by	Written by	Original release date	CAN viewers (millions)
14	1	"Janet's Roommate"	Peter Wellington	Ins Choi & Kevin White	September 26, 2017	0.516
Appa and Umma encourage Janet to stay home when her plans to move in with Gerald and Semira hit a snag. Kimchee tells Jung to make a move on Shannon, but her relationship with Alejandro shows no sign of ending. Gerald temporarily moves in with the Kims, but eventually Janet and Gerald find an apartment without Semira.
15	2	"Business Award"	Peter Wellington	Matt Kippen	October 3, 2017	N/A
Mrs. Kim wins a local business award, much to the chagrin of her husband. Jung persuades Shannon to start biking to work, but she is not very enthusiastic about it. Janet and Gerald have their first argument as roommates.
16	3	"House Guest"	Peter Wellington	Ins Choi & Kevin White	October 10, 2017	N/A
Pastor Nina stays with the Kims while her apartment is being renovated. Jung invites himself over to Janet's apartment for Game Night with her college friends, and worries that he might not be that smart. He considers going back to obtain his GED. The Kims find condoms underneath Janet's bed in their house, and are concerned with whether she is sexually active.
17	4	"Cardboard Jung"	Dawn Wilkinson	Ins Choi & Kevin White	October 17, 2017	N/A
Appa is ambivalent when Umma brings home a lifesized cardboard cutout of Jung made by Handy Car Rental as a promotion. Janet's cousin Nayoung returns. Janet, Nayoung, Jung and Kimchee get together one evening, and Nayoung ends up spending the night with Kimchee.
18	5	"Date Night"	Aleysa Young	Ins Choi & Kat Sandler	October 24, 2017	N/A
Janet pressures her father to join Mrs. Kim when she goes dancing, rather than hitting golf balls at the driving range. Jung accidentally stains a pair of sneakers from Kimchee's collection, and gets Shannon's help to try to replace them.
19	6	"Resting Place"	Peter Wellington	Anita Kapila	October 31, 2017	N/A
Mrs. Kim discovers that Mr. Kim sold her burial plot 20 years ago when money was tight in their family. They approach the woman who has Mrs. Kim's plot to purchase it back from her, but she is interested in buying Mr. Kim's plot instead so her husband can be next to her. When Gerald hears Janet's moaning sounds when using an electrical appliance in her room, he doesn't realise that she's using a neck massager. Jung does damage control after losing a play wrestling match to Kimchee.
20	7	"Sneak Attack"	Gary Campbell	Anita Kapila	November 7, 2017	N/A
Mr. Kim finds out that his wife has been reselling small amounts of skin cream obtained by her friend when she returns from Korea, and wants to expand the amount of skin cream they can resell. He has a contact with the Korean choir coming over from Seoul, and arranges to have them each bring over a small amount of the cream. However, when he goes to the restaurant to make the exchange, Mr. Kim gets scared when he sees policemen having lunch there. Janet feigns a Korean accent in order to get into a film festival after-party. The security guard lets her in, but later sees her at the convenience store, where Janet feels she must maintain her ruse. When Mrs. Kim offers the store's old freezer to Jung and Kimchee, Jung is reluctant to accept it, while Kimchee and Janet fight over who will get the freezer for their respective apartment.
21	8	"Silent Auction"	Dawn Wilkinson	Anita Kapila	November 14, 2017	N/A
Mrs. Park donates a mink coat for the church's silent auction. Mrs. Kim wants to wear it the day before the auction, but accidentally ruins it. Janet wins $500 playing a scratch-off at her convenience store, but cannot collect because she works there. Jung accuses Shannon of acting unprofessional, which brings someone from corporate HR in to investigate.
22	9	"New TV"	Renuka Jeyapalan	Nadyia Chettiar & Kevin White	November 21, 2017	N/A
Mr. Kim buys a new TV, so Mrs. Kim donates their old one to a newly arrived refugee family. However, they need to get the TV back, as Mr. Kim hid some cash in it. After questioning a photographer who was giving a lecture to her class, the photographer invites Janet to one of his photoshoots. Kimchee worries about Jung stealing his girlfriend.
23	10	"Janet's Boyfriend"	Renuka Jeyapalan	Matt Kippen	November 28, 2017	N/A
Janet tries to keep her relationship with Raj Mehta from Appa and Umma. Jung and Kimchee decide to throw a house party, but when Jung finds out that Shannon and her boyfriend will attend, he worries what they will think.
24	11	"Good Neighbours"	Siobhan Devine	Nadyia Chettiar & Carly Stone	December 5, 2017	N/A
Appa and Umma meet their new neighbour who is a fitness instructor, and they can hear his music in their store. Jung asks Marlow out to lunch, but then breaks it off when Shannon asks to have lunch with him. Gerald's new girlfriend appears to be copying whatever Janet does.
25	12	"Appa's First Text"	Peter Wellington	Carly Stone & Kevin White	December 12, 2017	N/A
A stray dog keeps coming into the store, so Mrs. Kim gifts the dog to Shannon. Janet is upset that her classmate does not want to invite her to the afterparty of her first solo exhibition. Jung texts with who he thinks is a girl he met the night before. It's actually his father, who has inherited Janet's old smartphone. They meet at a club, and appear to reconcile.
26	13	"Handy Graduation"	Peter Wellington	Anita Kapila, Matt Kippen & Kevin White	December 19, 2017	0.722
Umma wants the family to celebrate Jung getting his GED; Shannon organises a party to celebrate Jung's achievement but is conflicted when their feelings for each other surface. Janet gets tired of being the good one and feels unappreciated when Umma and Appa celebrate Jung's achievement while ignoring hers. Jung struggles to tell Shannon that he's taking a job elsewhere.

=== Season 3 (2019) ===
No. overall	No. in season	Title	Directed by	Written by	Original release date	CAN viewers (millions)
27	1	"New Appa-liance"	Peter Wellington	Ins Choi & Kevin White	January 8, 2019	N/A
Umma finally convinces Appa to get a new dishwasher, but Appa tries to exploit a store's price matching policy. Janet changes her professional name to make it easier for people to find her photographic work online. Jung treads carefully with Shannon in trying to get his job back at the new, merged Handy.
28	2	"Cutie Pie"	Peter Wellington	Matt Kippen	January 15, 2019	N/A
Appa gets a glowing online review about the store, later found to be from a flirtatious customer, making Umma jealous; Gerald's girlfriend Chelsea (Gabriella Sundar Singh) starts making herself at home in the apartment as their third roommate, just as Gerald wants to break off the relationship; With Kimchee as his direct superior, Jung is having trouble finding his place at Handy, so much so that he pitches the creation of a new back manager position to Shannon.
29	3	"Open Kimunication"	Peter Wellington	Carly Stone & Kevin White	January 22, 2019	N/A
When Appa and Umma look to settle an argument, they unwittingly end up in Pastor Nina's couples' therapy session. When Jung helps Shannon's boyfriend move a hutch, Jung suspects that he may be cheating on her. Janet meets one of her photography idols and asks for her email address in hopes that she'll be her mentor. However, Gerald finds out about this and wants to contact her as well. Janet intentionally gives Gerald the wrong email address, only to soon find out the email that she received was also incorrect.
30	4	"Thy Neighbour's Wifi"	Renuka Jeyapalan	Ins Choi & Kevin White	January 29, 2019	N/A
When the Kim's Wi-Fi starts acting up, Appa schemes to steal the Wi-Fi password from the CrashFit next door; Jung shows interest in Shannon's friend Katie, making Shannon jealous; Janet is recruited by Umma and Pastor Nina to read some Bible passages in front of the congregation, but is caught in a dilemma when her passage is deemed misogynistic by Gerald's friends. Pastor Nina is a guest as the Kims host a viewing party for friends of various Korean TV shows.
31	5	"Army Spoon"	Peter Wellington	Ins Choi & Kevin White	February 5, 2019	0.865
Gerald is so moved by Appa's story about his Korean army spoon that he chooses to photograph him for an upcoming exhibition, including an embellished version of the story. Janet feels that she insulted a waitress at Chelsea's supper club but things go from bad to worse when she returns to apologise. Jung tries to persuade Kimchee and Shannon to join him for skydiving. Umma is surprised by Kimchee listing her as his emergency contact, but gets even more surprised when she finds out how many of her own family members have not chosen her as their emergency contact.
32	6	"The Kim Cup"	Siobhan Devine	Anita Kapila	February 12, 2019	N/A
While cleaning out the basement, Appa and Jung compete for the family ping-pong tournament, the "Kim Cup"; Umma feels ignored by Janet and bonds with Chelsea, bewildering Janet; a mix-up regarding a gift basket delivered to Handy causes trouble for Shannon.
33	7	"Appanoon Delight"	Renuka Jeyapalan	Matt Kippen	February 19, 2019	N/A
Appa and Umma are in Janet's apartment, discover Gerald's waterbed, and have sex on it. Janet later finds out about it after they have sex for a second time on the waterbed and puncture it. Kimchee struggles to prepare a presentation for work and resents Jung's offer to help. Jung thinks he accidentally runs over Kimchee's foot, but later suspects that Kimchee is faking the injury, so that he can avoid the presentation.
34	8	"To Him It May Concern"	Weyni Mengesha	Carly Stone	February 26, 2019	N/A
Umma takes over sign-making duties for the store after Appa's embarrassing spelling mistake. With Kimchee's mother coming for a visit, Kimchee tries to hide all evidence of his friendship with Jung, whom his mother despises. Janet gets Gerald an interview for a photography scholarship, which requires a character reference. Appa volunteers to write one—which is very critical of Gerald—but Janet intercedes, and Gerald is willing to join Appa and sacrifice his scholarship to prove her manipulative intent.
35	9	"Blabber Talker"	Renuka Jeyapalan	Anita Kapila	March 5, 2019	N/A
Mr. Kim and Mr. Mehta discuss using formal salutations in addressing each other. Mr. Kim joins Facebook. Mr. Mehta hires Janet to take his son Raj's engagement photos, not realizing that they have a past. Appa and Umma look forward to their Cuban vacation until they accidentally invite the Lees to join them. Appa and Umma hire Mrs. Ada to do housecleaning, then suspect her of gossiping about them. The Handy staff do impressions of one another but Jung goes too far when the regional manager comes to visit.
36	10	"Elephant in the Room"	Siobhan Devine	Kurt Smeaton	March 12, 2019	N/A
Kimchee has a crush on the courier, Gwen (Jenny Raven), and gets bombarded with conflicting advice from both Shannon and Jung about what to do, especially after seeing Terence confirming a date with her. Janet retaliates when Umma throws out her childhood keepsakes, while Mr. Kim takes Mr. Mehta's advice to use the situation to buy a new reclining chair.
37	11	"Appanticitis"	Renuka Jeyapalan	Ins Choi & Kevin White	March 19, 2019	N/A
Mr. Kim starts wearing a new type of pants that can be worn as either slacks or shorts. Appa tries to give Umma advice about her habit of loudly applying lotion to her arms, but soon regrets it. Janet takes Gerald to the emergency room when his appendix flares up, not expecting the ER doctor to be her ex, Raj. Jung auditions for the Astounding Trek reality show with Kimchee, but doesn't want him to know that he's also auditioning with Shannon. Umma gets a new haircut, and it is not well received by the family.
38	12	"Hit 'n' Fun"	Peter Wellington	Ins Choi & Kevin White	March 26, 2019	N/A
In the church parking lot, Umma backs into Pastor Nina's new car and tries to avoid taking responsibility. After Appa fails to object to Jimmy's sexist jokes, Umma and Appa argue over gender roles and Appa agrees to make the Nanaimo bars for the church's bake sale. Janet tries to turn the tables on Gerald after she finds out he and Chelsea have been making fun of her. She has wine and snacks with Chelsea at their apartment, and Chelsea ends up kissing Janet on the mouth. Jung tries to get Shannon's birthday card back when he realises he wrote "Love, Jung" on it, but ends up implicating Kimchee. Mr. Kim's Nanamio bars are a big hit at the bake sale. Mrs. Kim and Pastor Nina agree to split the cost of repairing the collision damage to Pastor Nina's car.
39	13	"Lord of the Ring"	Peter Wellington	Anita Kapila, Matt Kippen, and Kurt Smeaton	April 2, 2019	N/A
Umma loses her wedding ring; Appa holds off telling her he's found it, and then ends up losing it himself. Janet and Jung join a yoga class taught by her crush, Nathan. Kimchee and Shannon argue over who gets to keep a barbecue grill they won. While Nathan and Janet are leaving for a date, Raj arrives to tell Janet that he has broken up with his fiancée in hopes of reconciling with Janet.

=== Season 4 (2020) ===
No. overall	No. in season	Title	Directed by	Written by	Original release date
40	1	"The Trollop"	Peter Wellington	Ins Choi & Kevin White	January 7, 2020
Janet and Raj deal with the aftermath of Raj's broken engagement. Mr. Kim tries to return an expensive dress that was originally purchased for Raj's wedding. Mr. Mehta suspects Raj broke up with his fiancee because of another woman, which Janet later tells her mother was her. Shannon gets in trouble when she tries to imitate a Chinese accent at work.
41	2	"Couch Surfing"	Peter Wellington	Matt Kippen	January 14, 2020
When a water pipe bursts in their apartment, Jung goes to stay with Janet and Kimchee stays with the Kims. Janet gets defensive when Jung accuses her of being "emotionally unavailable", and her housemates agree. Kimchee becomes the fall guy for Appa's mistakes, to Umma's fury.
42	3	"The Help"	Renuka Jeyapalan	Clara Altimas & Matt Kippen	January 21, 2020
Janet is offended when a rich patron assumes Umma is a food server at her school's art show. When Janet complains to her supervisor about the incident, the patron comes to Kim's Convenience and apologises to Mrs. Kim in person. After the apology, Mrs. Kim makes a subtle suggestion to them that Janet should win the award that she is being considered for, and Janet is later announced to be the winner. Shannon finally breaks up with Alejandro but wants to avoid having a "rebound" relationship with Jung.
43	4	"Happy Ummaversary"	Renuka Jeyapalan	Ins Choi & Kevin White	January 28, 2020
Janet plans a surprise anniversary dinner for Umma to be held with Jung and Appa - their first full family dinner in fifteen years - but her coverups backfire when Umma goes elsewhere in disinterest. Mrs. Kim eventually makes it to Janet's surprise party, and is very touched when she realises it is for her. Shannon wants to keep her relationship with Jung a secret at work, but eventually they all find out about it.
44	5	"Thinkin' 'Bout Inkin'"	Peter Wellington	Matt Kippen	February 4, 2020
After seeing Nathan with a new tattoo, Janet decides to get a tattoo for herself. The Kims think that Pastor Nina may be having an affair. When Shannon gives Jung a modest "five-week-iversary gift," Jung panics and gives Shannon the expensive necklace that Kimchee was planning to give to his girlfriend.
45	6	"Soccer Dad"	Renuka Jeyapalan	Ins Choi & Kevin White	February 11, 2020
Appa takes it upon himself to coach Jung's beer league soccer team; Shannon plans a birthday party for Stacie, whether she wants one or not; Janet teaches herself how to cook when Umma refuses to make a dish for her housemates.
46	7	"Beacon of Truth"	Siobhan Devine	Kevin White	February 18, 2020
Appa's feelings are hurt when Janet tells him she lied about a high school trip. Umma is tasked with telling Mrs. Mehta she's been thrown out of the book club. Appa lets slip a secret about Janet in front of Mrs. Mehta, so Janet decides to tell Mrs. Mehta about her previous relationship with Raj. Shannon and Jung have difficulties establishing boundaries at work.
47	8	"Chammo!"	Renuka Jeyapalan	Ins Choi & Kevin White	February 25, 2020
Shannon tries to befriend Janet by hiring her to photograph her cats and paying for a spa trip, but Janet is a little more circumspect. Umma asks Jung to pick up Appa at the dentist, but Jung is a little late and Mr. Kim has already left. Kimchee feels threatened by Terence eating wasabi, and tries to prove which one of them can eat the spiciest food. However, the Indian food he bought is so spicy that he ends up passing out.
48	9	"Which Witch is Which"	Peter Wellington	Anita Kapila	March 3, 2020
Umma is upset when she learns Janet drew her as a witch when she was 6. Jung is turned off by Shannon's "sexy" dance. Mr. Kim finds a $100 bill on the pavement and tries to do a good deed by secretly putting it in the bag of one of his less fortunate customers. Unfortunately, the customer doesn't realise it and ends up throwing out the bag in a dumpster.
49	10	"In the Bedroom"	Renuka Jeyapalan	Anita Kapila	March 10, 2020
After Mrs. Kim is unable to sleep one night due to Mr. Kim's snoring, both Kims resort to sleeping in separate rooms. Jung thinks he might be able to be a model, and asks Janet to take head shots for him to submit to agents. Terence takes very seriously a jigsaw puzzle that he brought to Handy, much to the amusement of Shannon and Kimchee.
50	11	"Birds of a Feather"	Peter Wellington	Clara Altimas	March 17, 2020
Jung becomes emotionally attached to a bird he's trying to nurse back to health for Shannon. Janet is annoyed when Chelsea steals her holiday idea and wants to go to Korea with Gerald to teach English. Appa is invited to give a business lecture but becomes jealous when he's bumped in favour of Jimmy by Pastor Nina, who are now dating each other.
51	12	"Knife Strife"	Siobhan Devine	Kurt Smeaton	March 24, 2020
Umma finds a knife that may have been a murder weapon. Janet breaks up with Nathan after deciding that they are not compatible. Kimchee tries to fit in at a meeting of trash-talking Handy managers, and takes shots at Shannon.
52	13	"Bon Voyage"	Peter Wellington	Anita Kapila, Matt Kippen & Kurt Smeaton	March 31, 2020
Appa gets annoyed when he learns Umma has made plans for her life after his death. They decide to scuba dive together, but Mr. Kim faints before they go out, and ends up in the hospital. At the hospital, Mrs. Kim drops a pen in front of a doctor, who then wants to test her for possible neurological problems. Janet gets a short-term job in Tanzania, where she will be gone for four months. When she and Gerald realise that they won't be seeing each other for awhile, they unexpectedly kiss. Shannon needs a roommate and Jung thinks she wants him to move in. He tells Kimchee that he will be moving in with Shannon, so Kimchee asks his girlfriend to move in. Shannon tells Jung that she'd rather not move in with him yet, so there will now be three people living in Kimchee's apartment.

=== Season 5 (2021) ===
No. overall	No. in season	Title	Directed by	Written by	Original release date
53	1	"Parking Pass"	Peter Wellington	Matt Kippen	January 19, 2021
With her MS diagnosis, Mrs. Kim struggles to tell Janet about it. Mrs. Kim's physician gives her a document allowing her to have an accessible parking permit, much to the delight of Mr. Kim. Janet comes back from Tanzania wanting to do international humanitarian work, but exaggerates her resume and doesn't get the job. Instead, she settles for helping local, underprivileged children with photography at an organization where she was originally rude to the hiring manager. Janet and Gerald finally meet after their trips, and mutually agree to keep their friendship platonic. Jung is in California, so he and Shannon exchange racy videos with each other, but Shannon mistakenly sends her video to Handy staff instead.
54	2	"Channouncements"	Renuka Jeyapalan	Clara Altimas	January 26, 2021
Pastor Nina's friend, a local television personality, has been doing church announcements, much to the annoyance of Mrs. Kim, who had previously been doing them. Mr. Kim starts reading Janet's private journal, but is caught by Gerald. Due to the hot weather, Shannon allows her staff to wear shorts on the job, but Terence decides to wear extra short, extra tight shorts.
55	3	"Appa & Linus"	Peter Wellington	Ins Choi	February 2, 2021
Mr. Kim mistakenly rips apart Gerald's security blanket that was given to him by his mother. Mr. Kim teases Gerald about it, so Gerald pretends to break one of Mr. Kim's favourite record albums. Mrs. Kim misrepresents herself to her MS support group, saying it is Janet and not her who has MS. After Shannon forbids Kimchee from taking the weekend off due to important work that needs to be done, she calls out sick at the last minute so she can visit Jung in California.
56	4	"Tennis Anyone?"	Peter Wellington	Kevin White	February 9, 2021
The Kims play at a tennis court in an upscale neighborhood, and pretend to another couple that they live there. In order to help Omar in front of his family who are visiting, Shannon pretends to be Omar's girlfriend. Janet invites a friend from work over for wine, and then realises she's still in high school and underage.
57	5	"A Tangled Web"	Renuka Jeyapalan	Garry Campbell	February 16, 2021
Nayoung arrives for a visit with her pet spider, which terrifies the Kims, particularly Mr. Kim. Kimchee neglects a crying co-worker when trying to provide information during a conference call, much to the consternation of Handy's employees. Jung returns home and sets up a lunch with his mother and Shannon, but is very concerned that the two women will not be able to get along with each other.
58	6	"Cookie Monster"	Peter Wellington	Ins Choi & Kevin White	February 23, 2021
Mr. Kim yells at Janet for having marijuana in the house, but Janet tells her that she is buying marijuana for Mrs. Kim to help with some of the pain she is experiencing from her MS. At Mrs. Kim's MRI appointment, Mr. Kim learns that he accidentally ate one of her drug cookies, and begins showing signs of being stoned. Shannon organises a staff party at her apartment, but the party migrates over to Kimchee's apartment instead, where a serious game of Catan develops.
59	7	"Chance Encounter"	Sherren Lee	Matt Kippen	March 2, 2021
Mr. Kim and Kimchee enjoy an impromptu hangout together, but both are uncomfortable that their friendship may upset Jung. Janet finds an envelope of money in the store and wants to split it with her mother if no one comes to claim it. Jung is annoyed by Shannon constantly asking questions while he's watching a show that he likes, so he tries to do that to her when she is watching a favorite show.
60	8	"Slippery Slope"	Justin Wu	Anita Kapila	March 9, 2021
Mrs. Kim falls in the shower, and is helped out by Gerald. Mr. Kim buys a shower chair for her so this won't happen again, but he later ends up falling in the shower. Janet uses Jung's past scrapes with the law as a juvenile to boost her reputation with students. A high school reunion for Kimchee has him thinking about an old flame.
61	9	"Field of Schemes"	Sherren Lee	Clara Altimas & Kevin White	March 16, 2021
Mr. Kim makes a controversial call when umpiring Pastor Nina's baseball game that lets her team win. However, when seeing the play again on someone's phone, he realises he made the wrong call. Janet gives her mum a sweater that she later thinks might be haunted. When Kimchee babysits Gwen's niece, he and Jung argue about how strict Kimchee should be with her.
62	10	"Who's Pranking Who?"	Siobhan Devine	Anita Kapila	March 23, 2021
Mr. Kim tries to prank Janet after thinking that she tried to prank him. When he tries to hide under her bed to surprise her, he sees her kissing a girlfriend that she met in Tanzania, and Janet tries to deflect by saying that she was pranking him instead. Kimchee takes over for Shannon at Handy after she recovers from eye surgery, and makes the decision to test a kiosk that if successful, would reduce staff. Shannon tells Mrs. Kim that she didn't like the Korean dish that Jung made her, not knowing it was really Mrs. Kim who made it. She comes back to make the dish again, this time with all of her regular ingredients.
63	11	"Matchy Matchy"	Siobhan Devine	Shebli Zarghami	March 30, 2021
Mrs. Kim tries to set Janet up with Vince, their new mason. When Shannon has Jung give a gift to his parents, it unwittingly creates an awkward situation between Jung and his father. Kimchee and Shannon can't get on the same page for evaluating Stacie's job performance.
64	12	"Hugs & Prayers"	Peter Wellington	Matt Kippen & Kevin White	April 6, 2021
Mr. Kim and Janet take a first aid course which is taught by Enrique, one of their customers. During the course, Mr. Kim continually makes fun of Enrique, much to the embarrassment of both Janet and Enrique. Mrs. Kim worries that her prayers to help others may be backfiring. Shannon and Jung are finalists for a reality TV show based on The Amazing Race.
65	13	"Family Business"	Peter Wellington	Ins Choi & Matt Kippen	April 13, 2021
Jung gives his parents a business presentation for their store, which leads them to ask Jung if he would like to take over Kim's Convenience. Kimchee searches for his long-lost father. After Jung didn't take Shannon's proposal to marry seriously, she decides to break up with him. Janet considers starting her own photography business, and Gerald expresses an interest in being a part of that.
