= Strays (TV series) =

Canadian tv sitcom (2021–2022)

- Based on: A character created by Ins Choi and Kevin White
- Developed by: Clara Altimas; Anita Kapila; Kevin White
- Starring: Nicole Power; Frank Cox-O'Connell; Tina Jung; Nikki Duval; Kevin Vidal; Tony Nappo; Paula Boudreau; Emily Piggford
- Country of origin: Canada
- No. of seasons: 2
- No. of episodes: 20

Production
- Executive producers: Ivan Fecan; Alexandra Raffé; Kevin White
- Producers: Sandra Cunningham; Ivan Fecan
- Production locations: Hamilton, Ontario, Canada
- Editor: Aren Hansen
- Production company: Thunderbird Entertainment

Original release
- Network: CBC Television
- Release: September 14, 2021 – November 15, 2022

Related
- Kim's Convenience

Strays is a Canadian television sitcom that aired on CBC Television for two seasons from 2021 to 2022. A spin-off of Kim's Convenience, the series centres on Shannon Ross (Nicole Power) as she embarks on a new career in Hamilton as executive director of an animal shelter.

The cast also includes Frank Cox-O'Connell, Tina Jung, Nikki Duval, Kevin Vidal, Tony Nappo, Paula Boudreau, Emily Piggford and Leah Doz. The series is produced by Thunderbird Entertainment.

The series had been planned to start production in 2020, but was delayed until early 2021 due to the COVID-19 pandemic in Canada. It premiered on September 14, 2021. It was renewed for a second season, which premiered in September 2022. The CBC announced in April 2023 that the show would not be picked up for a third season.

== Production ==
The show initially faced some criticism for the implications of the fact that Shannon, the only white character in the core cast of Kim's Convenience, was being given her own spinoff over any of the show's Asian characters. John Doyle of The Globe and Mail noted the complexities of the situation, explaining that since all of the other major characters in Kim's Convenience were drawn from Ins Choi's original theatrical play, and Shannon was the only character who had been newly created specifically for the television series, she was the only character who was the intellectual property of the show's producers and thus the only one who could be spun off without Choi's participation.

== Cast ==
- Nicole Power as Shannon Ross
- Frank Cox-O'Connell as Kristian
- Tina Jung as Joy
- Nikki Duval as Nikki
- Kevin Vidal as Liam
- Tony Nappo as Paul
- Paula Boudreau as Aunt Peggy
- Emily Piggford as Lara
- Leah Doz as Tonya
- Dennis Andres as Travis

== Episodes ==
Season	Episodes	Originally released	
Season	Episodes	First released	Last released
1	10	September 14, 2021	November 16, 2021
2	10	September 13, 2022	November 15, 2022

=== Season 1 (2021) ===
No. overall	No. in season	Title	Directed by	Written by	Original release date
1	1	"Cat Condo"	Pat Mills	Clara Altimas and Kevin White	September 14, 2021
2	2	"The Snowball Effect"	Pat Mills	Anita Kapila and Zlatina Pacheva	September 21, 2021
3	3	"New Neighbours"	Renuka Jeyapalan	Anita Kapila and Kevin White	September 28, 2021
4	4	"Trivial Pursuits"	Pat Mills	Clara Altimas	October 5, 2021
5	5	"Girls Night"	Renuka Jeyapalan	Anita Kapila	October 12, 2021
6	6	"Hot for Pappa"	Pat Mills	Kevin White	October 19, 2021
7	7	"Empty Nesters"	Joyce Wong	Rosamund Small and Kevin White	October 26, 2021
8	8	"Speak Your Truth"	Joyce Wong	Clara Altimas and Allana Reoch	November 2, 2021
9	9	"Animal Passion"	Aleysa Young	Clara Altimas and Anita Kapila	November 9, 2021
10	10	"Eggs Anyone?"	Aleysa Young	Anita Kapila and Kevin White	November 16, 2021

=== Season 2 (2022) ===
No. overall	No. in season	Title	Directed by	Written by	Original release date
11	1	"Friends & Neighbours"	Jasmin Mozaffari	Anita Kapila & Kevin White	September 13, 2022
12	2	"Puppy Love"	Jasmin Mozaffari	Clara Altimas & Anita Kapila	September 20, 2022
13	3	"Mama Madness"	Pat Mills	Lief Ramsaran & Kevin White	September 27, 2022
14	4	"Kristian's Therapist"	Pat Mills	Clara Altimas & Allana Reoch	October 4, 2022
15	5	"Shannon's Reign"	Joyce Wong	Anita Kapila & Zlatina Pacheva	October 11, 2022
16	6	"Testimonials"	Joyce Wong	Matt Kippen & Kevin White	October 18, 2022
17	7	"Attractor"	Jasmin Mozaffari	Clara Altimas & Kevin White	October 25, 2022
18	8	"House Sitting"	Jasmin Mozaffari	Anita Kapila & Matt Kippen	November 1, 2022
19	9	"Promoting from Within"	Clara Altimas	Matt Kippen & Kevin White	November 8, 2022
20	10	"Work Is Its Own Award"	Clara Altimas	Anita Kapila & Kevin White	November 15, 2022

== Critical response ==
Doyle favourably reviewed the first episodes of the series, writing that "The sheer energy of Strays is admirable. It's gags galore and it can be fiendishly clever contrivance, often anchored in the style of that theatrical staple, the British bedroom farce. At the same time, it's a distinctly contemporary Canadian series, with a diverse cast, and if there's a tincture of subtext that subtext is tolerance. But you'd hardly notice with all the exuberance on display. Besides, there are cute animals almost everywhere."
