= Diana Capponi =

Canadian mental health activist, psychiatric survivor and community leader

- Diana Capponi, from a 2009 interview
- Born: Diana Michele Capponi; February 22, 1953; Montreal, Quebec, Canada
- Died: September 21, 2014 (aged 61); Toronto, Ontario, Canada
- Occupations: Activist, community leader
- Years active: 1980s-2010s

Diana Michele Capponi (February 22, 1953 – September 21, 2014) was a Canadian mental health activist, psychiatric survivor, and community leader.

== Early life ==
Capponi was born in Montreal, Quebec, the youngest sister of writer and activist Pat Capponi. Both sisters described an abusive home, which they left as young women. In 1984, she graduated from a police training program at Centennial College in Toronto. "Going to college was the most significant thing I could have done to change my life," she said later.

== Career ==
Diana Capponi dropped out of school, traveled to India, and became addicted to heroin. Back in Canada, she moved to Toronto, Ontario, where two of her sisters lived. Her sister Pat helped her find housing in Parkdale and rehabilitation. She worked at a women's shelter, and then at a cleaning service. She founded the Ontario Council of Alternative Businesses (OCAB), to create economic opportunities for psychiatric survivors. She served on the board of directors at the Gerstein Centre in Toronto.

In 2003, Capponi became coordinator of the new Employment Works program at the Centre for Addiction and Mental Health (CAMH). In this position she continued her earlier work, building businesses and careers with survivors of addiction and mental illness. She consulted on similar projects and on mental health policy across Canada, and internationally. "Current research indicates that there is absolutely no correlation between a person's mental health diagnosis and their ability to work. If you can do the job, then you can do the job, period," she explained.

Capponi appeared in a National Film Board of Canada documentary, Working Like Crazy (1999), and in a television program, Second Chance: Making It Work (2005). In 2009, she testified about employment and mental health before a committee of the Canadian Parliament.

== Personal life ==
Capponi identified herself as a psychiatric survivor. She married Brenda Needham in 2003; they stopped living together in 2009, but remained close. Capponi died in 2014, from metastatic breast cancer, at age 61, in Toronto. In 2015, there was a tribute night held to raise funds for the Diana Capponi Education Fund.
