= Tommy Chang (martial artist) =

Korean-Canadian taekwondo instructor, actor, stunt performer/coordinator, and producer

Tommy Chang is a South Korean martial artist, stunt performer and actor. Chang is a 8th dan black belt in Taekwondo and 8th dan in Hapkido. He is the founder of the ReelStunts Action Team and the president of the Black Belt World Canada Taekwondo school.

Chang has 51 years of training and experience in Taekwondo and Hapkido and is also trained in International Taekwondo Federation (ITF) and World Taekwondo Federation (WTF) Taekwondo, Moo Duk Kwan, and Judo. He is also an 8th Degree Black Belt in Hap Ki-Do, specializing in pressure points, take-downs and grappling. His martial arts expertise also encompasses mastery of several weapons. In addition, he is a WTF-certified Master Instructor of Taekwondo and a Canadian National Referee (1st Class).

== Career ==
=== Taekwondo ===
Chang's career is marked with several milestones including being elected Vice President Sport of Taekwondo Canada, having been the Canadian Taekwondo Team Manager for the 2nd Korean Open in 1999, as well as the Canadian National Team Manager and Coach for the 1999 Taekwondo World Championship in Turkey. He also held several offices such as vice-chairman of the World Tae Kwon Do Association of Canada (Tournament Committee), Pan-American Tae Kwon Do Union Tournament Vice-chairman (2004–2006), and Pan-American Tae Kwon Do Union Financial Committee Chairman (2004–2006). At the provincial level, he also served as the Ontario Taekwondo Association Chairman from 2007 to 2008. He is the past 1st vice-president of the Ontario Taekwondo Association.

=== Film and television career ===
Chang has worked in the film and television industry for over 35 years in several capacities as actor, stunt performer, stunt coordinator and producer. He is also the founder, manager and team leader of ReelStunts Film/Television Action Stunt Team. Additionally, he also personally trained several members of his stunt team which specializes in Martial Arts, High Falls, Stunt Driving, Fireburns, Gymnastics, Acrobatics, Breakdancing, Weapons Training, Motion Capture Acting, Wirework, and Acting. His stunt team includes the personalities of Simon Kim, James Kim, Joe Eigo, Emerson Wong, Allen Keng and Tonya Henry. Some of the noteworthy accomplishments of this team include having worked with Steven Seagal, Chow Yun-fat, David Carradine, Seth Rogen, James Franco, Charlie Hunnam, Vin Diesel, and Jackie Chan.

In his stunt execution for a television show called Side Factor, after performing multiple takes of propulsion into the air via an air ram, Chang wound up with a compound fracture.

He completed a major motion picture as fight choreographer in 2012 on a film called Pacific Rim directed by Guillermo Del Toro and produced by Warner Brothers and Legendary Pictures starring Charlie Hunnam, Charlie Day, Idris Elba and Rinko Kikuchi and Ron Perlman. In 2013, he produced a full feature movie as an associate producer called The Hacker with Sanzhar Sultanov. He also executive produced a short feature film called The Proposal starring Missy Peregyrm and Peter Mooney. He featured in the film Robocop and The Interview starring James Franco in 2014. He played Hapkido instructor Master Yang in Kim's Convenience.

== Ontario pit bull ban ==
In mid-October 2021, Chang's family dog, 12-week-old puppy Dwaeji, was seized by Vaughan Animal Services after it had run from his home through an open door. Animal Services staff suspected the dog of being part pit bull, a breed banned in Ontario since 2005 under the Dog Owners' Liability Act. The case attracted significant public and media attention. Chang contacted animal advocacy groups and his Member of Provincial Parliament (MPP) Michael Tibollo, who escalated his case. As a result, the premier of Ontario, Doug Ford, personally followed-up with Chang and on November 5, 2021, the Ontario Ministry of Agriculture, Food and Rural Affairs announced it would amend the regulations related to the province's pit bull ban, allowing seized dogs to be released during investigations.

The dog was released and four days later mauled 13-year old Muhammad Almutaz Alzghool, leaving the boy's face swollen and needing stitches.

== Black Belt World ==
Master Chang is retired and is the Technical Director of Taekwondo schools in Canada, Black Belt World, with branch locations in Burlington, Kitchener Vaughan, Waterloo, Woodbridge and Mississauga.
