= Pat Capponi =

Canadian writer (1949–2020)

- Pat Capponi, in a 1980 photograph for the Toronto Star by Keith Beaty
- Born: Patricia Ann Capponi; July 1, 1949; Montreal
- Died: April 6, 2020 (aged 70); Toronto
- Occupations: Advocate for psychiatric consumer-survivors, others living in poverty or precarity

Patricia Ann Capponi, OOnt CM (July 1, 1949 – April 6, 2020) was a Canadian writer and an advocate for mental health issues and poverty issues in Canada.

== Early life and education ==
Pat Capponi was born in Montreal. She attended Dawson College and Sir George Williams University.

== Career ==
=== Activism ===
Capponi served as a board member at the Centre for Addiction and Mental Health in Toronto, as a part time board member of the Consent and Capacity Board and as a member of the Advocacy Commission in Ontario. Capponi was the co-facilitator of the "From Surviving To Advising" initiative undertaken by the Centre for Addiction and Mental Health (CAMH). The effort brought together consumer-survivors with psychiatry residents to allow those with lived experience to work with residents to understand new perspectives of recovery. "We, those with lived experience, must challenge the status quo," explained Capponi. "We must be the change agents, we must dare to speak our truths even when gate-keepers and those who derive their status and employment from our communities deny us our right to speak, to engage, to point out the systemic failures that guarantee their jobs and our continued poverty."

For her decades of activism and leadership, Capponi was named a Member of the Order of Ontario in 1993, and a Member of the Order of Canada in 2015.

=== Writing ===
Capponi's published writing included several nonfiction titles and a mystery novel series. Her first five books, including Upstairs in the Crazy House (1992) and Beyond the Crazy House (2003), report on her experiences with psychiatric hospitalization and boarding house living, and contain her thoughts on improving provisions for consumer-survivors. Her last two books, Last Stop Sunnyside (2006) and The Corpse Will Keep (2008) are mysteries featuring a woman detective in Toronto's Parkdale neighborhood, where Capponi lived. She also wrote and published a newsletter, The Cuckoo's Nest, and hosted a local cable television program, Cuckoo's Nest Cable.

== Personal life ==
Capponi moved to Toronto at 18, to escape her abusive family home, and had several psychiatric hospitalizations there. Capponi was openly lesbian. Her sister Diana Capponi also moved to Toronto, and did similar work, with fellow survivors of abuse and addiction, before her death in 2014. Pat Capponi was diagnosed with lung cancer in 2019, and died with medical assistance at age 70 years, on April 6, 2020, in a Toronto hospital. In a farewell video, she encouraged her audience to "work on yourselves, work on the system, reach back, help people who are striving to be seen and need role models."

== Awards ==
- Order of Ontario (1993)
- Order of Canada (2015)
- Lifetime Achievement Award, CivicAction Leadership Foundation (2018)
- C. M. Hincks Award from the Canadian Mental Health Association

== Selected publications ==
- Upstairs in the Crazy House (1992) ISBN 0-670-83898-5
- Dispatches from the Poverty Line (1997) ISBN 0-14-026233-4
- The War at Home (1999) ISBN 0-670-88244-5
- Bound by duty : walking the beat with Canada's cops (2000) ISBN 0-670-88931-8
- Beyond the Crazy House: changing the future of madness (2003) ISBN 0-14-100510-6
- Last Stop Sunnyside (2006) ISBN 0-00-639412-4 ISBN 978-0-00-639412-9
- The Corpse Will Keep (2008) ISBN 978-1-55468-100-6
