= Kim's Convenience =

Canadian television sitcom (2016–2021)

- Based on: Kim's Convenience by Ins Choi
- Developed by: Ins Choi; Kevin White
- Starring: Paul Sun-Hyung Lee; Jean Yoon; Andrea Bang; Simu Liu; Andrew Phung; Nicole Power
- Country of origin: Canada
- Original language: English
- No. of seasons: 5
- No. of episodes: 65 (list of episodes)

Production
- Executive producers: Ivan Fecan; Alexandra Raffe; Ins Choi; Kevin White; Alan Dilworth; Tania Senewiratne
- Producer: Ivan Fecan
- Production locations: Toronto, Ontario, Canada
- Production companies: Strada Films; Soulpepper; Thunderbird Films; Canadian Broadcasting Corporation

Original release
- Network: CBC Television
- Release: October 11, 2016 – April 13, 2021

Related
- Strays

Kim's Convenience is a Canadian television sitcom that aired on CBC Television from October 2016 to April 2021. It depicts the Korean Canadian Kim family that runs a convenience store in the Moss Park neighbourhood of Toronto: parents "Appa" (Paul Sun-Hyung Lee) and "Umma" (Jean Yoon) – Korean for dad and mom, respectively – along with their daughter Janet (Andrea Bang) and estranged son Jung (Simu Liu). Other characters include Jung's friend and coworker Kimchee (Andrew Phung) and his manager Shannon (Nicole Power). The series is based on Ins Choi's 2011 play of the same name.

The first season was filmed from June to August 2016 at Showline Studios in Toronto. It is produced by Thunderbird Films in conjunction with Toronto's Soulpepper Theatre Company, with Lee and Yoon reprising their roles from the play. Scripts were created by Choi and Kevin White, who previously wrote for Corner Gas.

The second season premiered September 26, 2017. In July 2018, the series became available outside of Canada when it debuted internationally on Netflix. However, since January 2020, it is no longer available in all markets (e.g., the Netherlands), making the fourth season unavailable to a worldwide audience. The third season premiered January 8, 2019 and the fourth premiered January 7, 2020.

On March 31, 2020, it was initially announced that the show had been renewed for two more seasons, and on March 8, 2021, it was revealed that the show would end after the fifth season, due to the departure of the show's two co-creators. Since the show's cancellation, three of the show's lead actors have publicly discussed production issues, particularly criticising a lack of diversity among behind-the-scenes staff. This has been disputed by others, including a television critic who was not involved in the production of the show but pointed out that the writers included women. In an April 2026 interview on Q with Tom Power, Yoon confirmed problems with workplace culture and diversity on set. She said that, in hindsight, she wished she had seen the simmering problems more clearly and taken more active action against them.

A spin-off series, Strays, began production in February 2021 after a one-year delay caused by the COVID-19 pandemic.

== Cast and characters ==
=== Main ===
- Paul Sun-Hyung Lee as Mr. Sang-il Kim ("Appa"). The family patriarch, Kim Sang-il, studied to be a teacher in Korea before immigrating to Canada with his wife, where they now own and operate Kim's Convenience, a convenience store in Toronto's Moss Park neighbourhood. Mr. Kim is traditional, proud and stubborn, practical, opinionated and blunt. He is 56 years old at the start of the series and estranged from his son Jung, a frayed relationship he gradually attempts to mend beginning in Season 2.
- Jean Yoon as Mrs. Yong-mi Kim ("Umma"). The family matriarch, Kim Yong-mi, 54 at the start of the series, was also a teacher in Korea. She is hardworking and kind but also meddles in the lives of her family. Her life revolves around the store, family, and church, where she volunteers.
- Andrea Bang as Janet Kim, 20 at the start of the series, Mr. and Mrs. Kim's daughter and Jung's younger sister. She is the family member in most frequent contact with Jung. Attending OCAD University, where she studies photography, Janet is a talented artist but is frustrated by her parents' traditionalism, their lack of support for her art, and the fact that they overparent her due to Jung's estrangement from the household.
- Simu Liu as Jung Kim, 24 at the start of the series, Mr. and Mrs. Kim's son and Janet's brother. Jung works at Handy Car Rental, where he is promoted to assistant manager early in the series. After briefly leaving for another job, he returns when a negative background check costs him the new position. He was a rebellious teenager who had engaged in petty street crimes, earning him a brief stint in juvenile detention, but has since eschewed criminal mischief. He was kicked out of the family home by Mr. Kim after stealing from him and remains estranged from his father, though he is still in contact with the rest of the family, and gradually reconnects with his father over the course of the series.
- Andrew Phung as Arnold "Kimchee" Han, 25 at the start of the series. Jung's best friend since childhood, co-worker, roommate, and former partner in crime. He is promoted to assistant manager after Jung initially leaves Handy Car Rental at the end of Season 2, now serving as his superior.
- Nicole Power as Shannon Ross, 26. The manager of Handy Car Rental, and Jung and Kimchee's boss, she has a crush on Jung in season 1 and is often awkward in her attempts to appear cool and hip. Over multiple seasons with sexual tension between them, Shannon and Jung enter into a relationship after Shannon breaks up with Alejandro – who repeatedly cheated on her. Jung and Shannon's relationship is complicated due to Shannon being his manager at Handy. In the first episode of season 1 it is revealed that she is a diabetic.

=== Recurring ===
- Ben Beauchemin as Gerald Tremblay, Janet's classmate at OCAD. He is intimidated by Mr. Kim and has awkward interactions with him. He and Janet later become roommates after Janet moves away from her family's home in season 2. He starts dating Chelsea Chettiar in season 3, and returns to a job at Kim's Convenience in the 5th season, due to the low salary at his internship.
- John Ng as Mr. Chin, Mr. Kim's friend and a successful entrepreneur, owning several businesses. Fastidious, he does not like to do manual labour. He is single with a dog named Ginger. He often treats Ginger like one would treat a significant other.
- Michael Musi as Terence Pepler, a mild-mannered employee who frequently misses out on inside jokes at Handy Car Rental. He is promoted to back manager at Handy's in season 3 and formerly dated Gwen, Kimchee's girlfriend.
- Getenesh Berhe as Semira, one of Janet's OCAD photography classmates and friends.
- Derek McGrath as Frank, a repairman and friend of Mr. Kim's who tells pointless anecdotes while working, often reminiscing about his former wife Bernice. Mr. Kim is almost always annoyed by this.
- Soo-Ram Kim as Nayoung, Janet's cheery, pop culture enthusiast cousin from South Korea in season 1. In season 2 she moves to Canada to attend the University of Waterloo. She leaves Canada to return to South Korea in season 5.
- Michael Xavier as Alex Jackson, a police officer who was Jung's childhood friend and who is romantically interested in Janet in season 1.
- Sabrina Grdevich as Ms. Murray, one of Janet's professors at OCAD. She parents her five-year-old son, Oliver, with little discipline, once causing a disturbance in the Kim's store, and holds Janet's work in a low regard.
- Hiro Kanagawa as Pastor Choi, the pastor at the Kims' church in season 1.
- Amanda Brugel as Pastor Nina Gomez, associate pastor at the Kims' church. She becomes pastor from season 1 onward.
- Christina Song as Mrs. Lee, Grace Lee's mother and Mrs. Kim's friend and fellow parishioner at their church.
- Uni Park as Mrs. Park, a supercilious and well-to-do parishioner at Mrs. Kim's church who looks down on the Kims.
- Sugith Varughese as Mr. Mehta, a friend of Mr. Kim's who owns an Indian buffet restaurant nearby. Despite being friends, Mr. Mehta and Mr. Kim never use their first names, which are Sanjeev and Sang-il, respectively.
- Rodrigo Fernandez-Stoll as Enrique Moratonas, a registered nurse and regular customer. He considers Mr. Kim his friend, but this is unrequited. He alerts Mr. Kim to a potentially significant health issue.
- Gabriella Sundar Singh as Chelsea Chettiar, Gerald's girlfriend beginning in season 2. Due to a misunderstanding about household expenses, she moves in with Gerald and Janet in season 3.
- Benjamin Sutherland as Nathan, a yoga instructor and one of Janet's classmates at OCAD who later becomes her boyfriend in season 4.
- Tina Jung as Jeanie Park, Mrs. Park's introverted teenage daughter.
- Kris Hagen as Sketchy-looking dude, a regular customer who is also revealed to be a bike thief in Season 2.
- Gavin Williams as Cereal Customer, a regular customer who is frequently and inadvertently present in intense Kim family arguments.
- Marco Grazzini as Alejandro, Shannon's world-travelling philandering boyfriend from the end of season 1 until Shannon breaks up with him in season 4.
- Ishan Davé as Raj Mehta, an emergency room doctor who is the Mehtas' son and Janet's boyfriend in season 2 and her ex in season 3.
- Ellora Patnaik as Mrs. Anjali Mehta, Mr. Mehta's wife and a friend of Mrs. Kim. She was asked to leave Mrs. Kim's book club due to a failure to fit in with the others.
- Jenny Raven as delivery driver Gwen, Kimchee's girlfriend from season 3 onward. Terence gives her flute lessons, which Kimchee initially misinterprets as a romantic relationship.
- Akosua Amo-Adem as Stacie, one of Jung's co-workers after he returns to Handy in season 3. She is incredibly stoic and any degree of active friendliness from her is taken as strange.
- Ziad Ek as Omar, one of Jung's co-workers after he returns to Handy in season 3.
- Lara Arabian as Mrs. Ada, a regular customer, and the matriarch of a new immigrant family. She briefly works for the Kims as a cleaner in season 3.
- Kayla Lorette as Dree Davis, Janet's popular classmate at OCAD.
- Soma Chhaya as Divya, Raj's fiancé in season 3. Raj breaks off their engagement near the end of the season in the hopes of winning Janet back, whom he still has feelings for.
- Gia Sandhu as Marlow, an associate at Handy Car Rental. She has a brief flirtation with Jung, but rejects him when it becomes clear that he still has a crush on Shannon.
- James Yi as Jimmy Young, a sexist car dealership owner and parishioner at the Korean church who later becomes Pastor Nina's boyfriend in season 4.
- Daren A. Herbert as Kwami, a roommate of Shannon & Jung's in season 5. He is also the director at the Desmond Community Centre where Janet works.

== Production ==
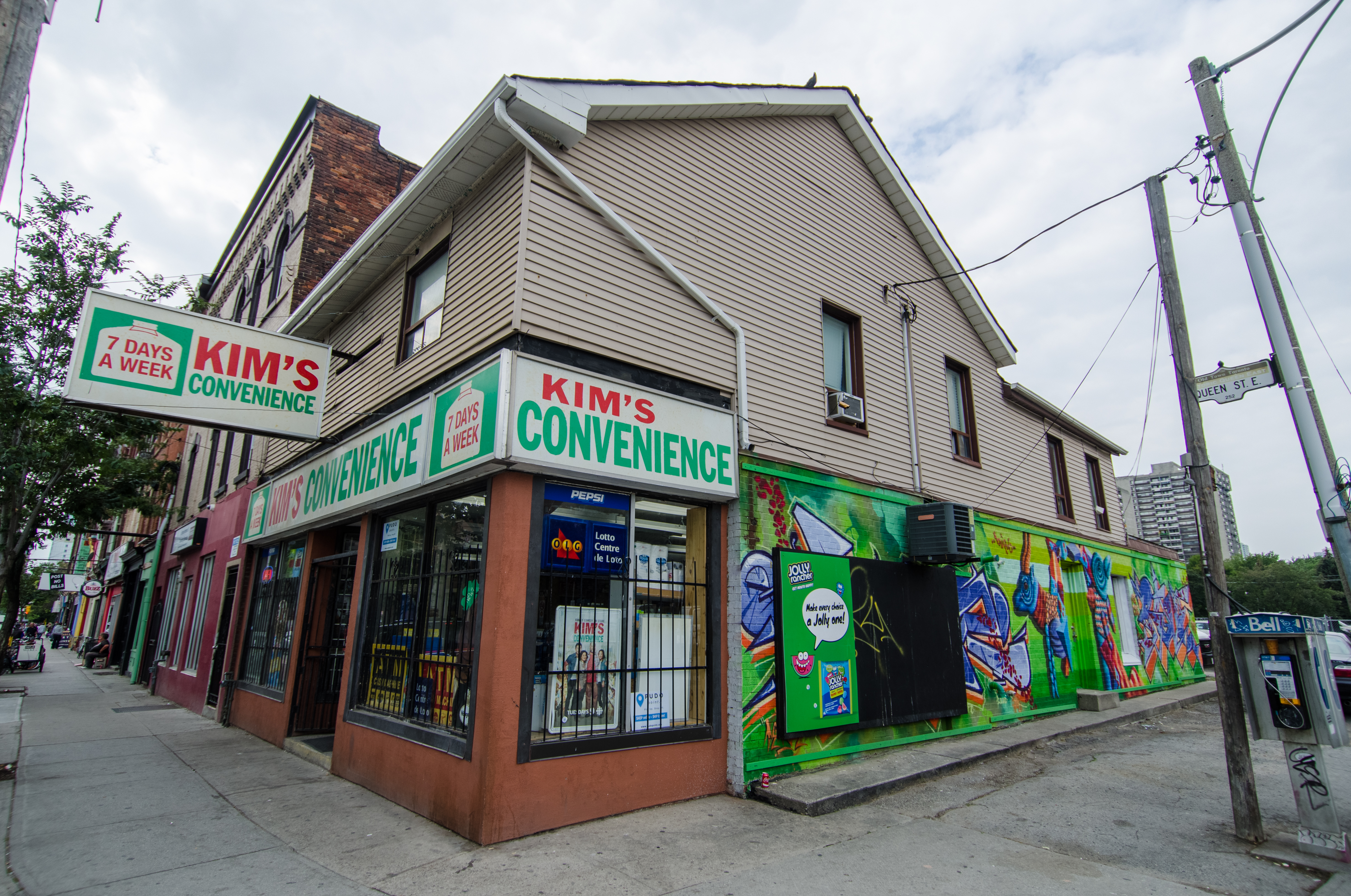
An existing convenience store in Toronto, Mimi Variety at 252 Queen Street East, was redesigned to stand in for exterior shots in the show.

Interior scenes at the store, Handy Car Rental and home are shot at Studio City Toronto (formerly Showline Studios) at 915 Lake Shore Boulevard East, where an exact replica of Mimi Variety, the model for the store, has been recreated. The studio is also used as the exterior of the car rental business. One episode was shot in Koreatown at Bloor and Christie Streets.

The long-established Mimi Variety store at 252 Queen Street East is used for exterior shots and as the model for the interior set built in the studio. While the signage has been adjusted, the "Kim's Convenience" sign uses the same red and green lettering as the original sign. All other sections, such as the "7 DAYS A WEEK" element, are the original signage of Mimi Variety. The owners of the Mimi Variety store have retained the new signage, even though the business has not officially changed its name. The producers also painted a mural on an exterior wall, mostly seen in the credit sequence and for stock transitional shots, as well as for promotional shots.

Episodes for season 5 were filmed in 2020 under strict protocols during the COVID-19 pandemic in Canada. Simu Liu had planned to return to Toronto for the start of production once he was finished shooting Shang-Chi and the Legend of the Ten Rings in Australia. Since filming for both projects overlapped due to delays caused by the pandemic, he was only able to return to Toronto toward the end of production, where he continued shooting for nine days until he had completed "all the stuff that he missed out on".

On March 8, 2021, it was announced that the series would be coming to an end after the fifth season, despite being renewed for a sixth season a year earlier, due to the departure of series creators Choi and White, who decided to move on to other projects after the production completion on the fifth season. The show's producers, Thunderbird Films, ultimately decided not to move forward with the sixth season, believing that they would not be able to deliver the "same heart and quality". One of the aforementioned projects was a spin-off of the show, Strays, which would center on character Shannon Ross, played by Nicole Power, and was developed by White with Kim's producer Ivan Fecan serving as executive producer. Fecan explained that Choi was unsure of how to continue with the show beyond the fifth season. The cast and crew attempted to persuade Choi to remain for the show's planned sixth and final season, but ultimately Choi decided to depart the show. Paul Sun-Hyung Lee, who played Appa in both the series and the original play, said that Choi stopped contacting Lee after speaking with him about staying on the show. He later said the series "died from within...No matter how good it can be, if you don't deal with issues from within and try to gloss it over because everything on the surface looks fantastic and idealistic, then you are just asking for trouble. I think that's the unfortunate lesson from this whole thing." Fecan decided to end the show as he believed the series could not continue without Choi.

On June 2, 2021, cast member Simu Liu claimed that the show suffered from a lack of diversity among writers and producers and that there was discord behind the scenes. He also claimed that actors were not allowed to offer creative input and that the cast was poorly paid. Shortly after, on June 6, 2021, actor Jean Yoon stated on social media that "[A]s an Asian Canadian woman, a Korean-Canadian woman w [sic] more experience and knowledge of the world of my characters, the lack of Asian female, especially Korean writers in the writers' room of Kim's [Convenience] made my life very difficult and the experience of working on the show painful." Liu stated he would not reprise his role in Strays, citing concerns that the spin-off focused on Shannon, the only white main character in Kim's Convenience. John Doyle of The Globe and Mail noted the complexities of the situation, explaining that since all of the other major characters in Kim's Convenience were drawn from Ins Choi's original theatrical play, and Shannon was the only character who had been newly created specifically for the television series, she was the only one the producers could legally spin off without Choi’s involvement.

== Episodes ==
Series	Episodes	Originally released	
Series	Episodes	First released	Last released
1	13	11 October 2016	27 December 2016
2	13	26 September 2017	19 December 2017
3	13	8 January 2019	2 April 2019
4	13	7 January 2020	31 March 2020
5	13	19 January 2021	13 April 2021

== Home releases ==
Entertainment One released the first two seasons of Kim's Convenience on Region 1 DVD on March 7, 2017.

Season	Episodes	Release date
Season	Episodes	Region 1
1	13	March 7, 2017
2	13	March 6, 2018

== Reception ==
The show was released to mostly positive reception from critics. On review aggregator website Rotten Tomatoes, the first season holds an approval rating of 100% based on 13 critics' reviews, with an average rating of 9/10. John Doyle of The Globe and Mail wrote that the show "stays away from the pseudo-seriousness that could easily plague a comedy about immigrants and family dynamics." In conclusion, Doyle called it "a clever, generally engaging screwball comedy with an eye on entertainment". The Toronto Star's Tony Wong wrote that "the show is good. Possibly even great. The dialogue is sharp, on point and borderline subversive. It has the potential to be a future classic. It has bite...It's funny and true, but not a reality we typically see reflected on television." Reviewing the series following its release for US audiences on Netflix, Bryan Washington of Vulture remarked on the series' treatment of political issues surrounding immigrants, noting the tensions are never truly in the background but also do not take precedence over the comedy, remarking "I haven't laughed as hard all year, with feeling, as I have alongside the series."

Despite the series being based on a play by Korean Canadian Ins Choi, and Choi writing over a third of the 65 episodes, Rick Salutin, also of the Star, was less enthusiastic of the show's portrayal of minorities on television, stating that "only accents are funny in Kim's Convenience" and that audiences are "laughing at the characters not with them". Salutin concluded by stating, "I don't see why supporting Canadian culture means you should be uncritical, as if someone will take it away if you weren't. You should be most critical about what you care most about like public education or the CBC, you want them to be good not just there". Although not directly a response to Salutin's review, actor Paul Sun-Hyung Lee (Appa) questioned critics' inclination to cite accents as offensive:

They won't say—but is it because you're seeing Asians on the screen? Oh, no? Well, then it must be because he sounds different. Well, guess what: Asian people have accents. The accent isn't about a joke, it's part of who that character is, but it doesn't make it intrinsically racist. If you're uncomfortable with that baggage, then you need to examine it yourself and see where it comes from.

Mark Breslin, founder of the Canadian comedy club chain Yuk Yuk's, was critical of the show's lack of strong humour:

As a sitcom, it's more sit than com. It's pleasant to watch but just not that funny. The characters aren't exaggerated enough. They lack big comic flaws. The conflicts are subtle and minor key. You want to give its creators kudos for finally putting Asians on TV in the right way, but the whole enterprise plays like a civics lesson. The characters all behave with dignity, and dignity may be the enemy of laughter.

=== Ratings ===
Midway through its first season, Kim's Convenience was estimated by Numeris to have an average audience of 933,000 per episode, with 39% of viewers between the ages of 25 and 54.

=== Awards ===
For the 5th Canadian Screen Awards in 2017, Kim's Convenience garnered 11 nominations, including Best Comedy Series, Best Actor in a Comedy Series (Lee), Best Actress in a Comedy Series (Yoon and Bang), and Best Supporting Actor in a Comedy Series (Phung). Lee won the award for best actor in a continuing leading comedic role for his portrayal of Appa, and Phung won Best Supporting Actor for his portrayal of Kimchee.

Kim's Convenience won two awards at the 2017 Toronto ACTRA Awards, Outstanding Performance - Female for actress Jean Yoon and the Members’ Choice Series Ensemble Award for Best Cast.

The first-season episodes "Ddong Chim" and "Janet's Photos" are 2017 Writers Guild of Canada's Canadian Screenwriting Awards finalists in the TV comedy category.

At the 6th Canadian Screen Awards in 2018, the series received 12 nominations. It won the awards for Best Comedy Series, Best Actor in a Comedy Series (Lee) and Best Supporting Actor in a Comedy Series (Phung).

As the show's third season aired in the winter of 2019 rather than the fall of 2018, it did not air inside the eligibility period for the 7th Canadian Screen Awards.

Year	Award	Category	Nominee	Result	Ref.
2017	ACTRA Awards	Outstanding Performance by a Female Actress	Jean Yoon ("Gay Discount")	Won	
2017	ACTRA Awards	Outstanding Performance by an Ensemble		Won	
2017	5th Canadian Screen Awards	Best Comedy Series		Nominated	
2017	5th Canadian Screen Awards	Best Direction in a Comedy Program or Series	Peter Wellington ("Gay Discount")	Nominated	
2017	5th Canadian Screen Awards	Best Writing in a Comedy Program or Series	Ins Choi, Kevin White ("Gay Discount")	Nominated	
2017	5th Canadian Screen Awards	Best Writing in a Comedy Program or Series	Garry Campbell ("Ddong Chim")	Nominated	
2017	5th Canadian Screen Awards	Best Actress in a Comedy Series	Jean Yoon	Nominated	
2017	5th Canadian Screen Awards	Best Actress in a Comedy Series	Andrea Bang	Nominated	
2017	5th Canadian Screen Awards	Best Actor in a Comedy Series	Paul Sun-Hyung Lee	Won	
2017	5th Canadian Screen Awards	Best Casting	Deirdre Bowen, Millie Tom ("Frank & Nayoung")	Won	
2017	5th Canadian Screen Awards	Best Supporting Actor in a Comedy Series	Andrew Phung ("Janet's Photos", "Ddong Chim")	Won	
2017	5th Canadian Screen Awards	Best Photography in a Comedy Program or Series	Fraser Brown ("Frank & Nayoung")	Nominated	
2017	5th Canadian Screen Awards	Best Picture Editing in a Comedy Program or Series	Kye Meechan ("Gay Discount")	Won	
2017	WGC Screenwriting Awards	TV Comedy	Garry Campbell ("Ddong Chim")	Nominated	
2017	WGC Screenwriting Awards	TV Comedy	Ins Choi, Kevin White ("Janet's Photos")	Nominated	
2018	ACTRA Awards	Outstanding Performance by a Male Actor	Paul Sun-Hyung Lee ("Hapkido")	Nominated	
2018	ACTRA Awards	Outstanding Performance by an Ensemble		Nominated	
2018	6th Canadian Screen Awards	Best Comedy Series		Won	
2018	6th Canadian Screen Awards	Best Direction, Comedy	Aleysa Young ("Date Night")	Nominated	
2018	6th Canadian Screen Awards	Best Photography, Comedy	Fraser Brown ("Cardboard Jung")	Nominated	
2018	6th Canadian Screen Awards	Best Picture Editing, Comedy	Aren Hansen ("Date Night")	Nominated	
2018	6th Canadian Screen Awards	Best Writing, Comedy	Anita Kapila ("Resting Place")	Nominated	
2018	6th Canadian Screen Awards	Best Writing, Comedy	Matt Kippen ("Business Award")	Nominated	
2018	6th Canadian Screen Awards	Best Achievement in Casting	Deirdre Bowen	Nominated	
2018	6th Canadian Screen Awards	Best Lead Actor, Comedy	Paul Sun-Hyung Lee	Won	
2018	6th Canadian Screen Awards	Best Supporting or Guest Actor, Comedy	Andrew Phung ("Cardboard Jung", "Resting Place")	Won	
2018	6th Canadian Screen Awards	Best Lead Actress, Comedy	Andrea Bang	Nominated	
2018	6th Canadian Screen Awards	Best Lead Actress, Comedy	Jean Yoon	Nominated	
2018	6th Canadian Screen Awards	Best Supporting or Guest Actress, Comedy	Nicole Power	Nominated	
2018	WGC Screenwriting Awards	TV Comedy	Anita Kapila ("Resting Place")	Nominated	
2018	WGC Screenwriting Awards	TV Comedy	Matt Kippen ("Business Award")	Nominated	
2019	Seoul International Drama Awards	Most Popular Foreign Drama of the Year		Won	
2020	8th Canadian Screen Awards	Best Comedy Series		Nominated	
2020	8th Canadian Screen Awards	Best Lead Actor, Comedy Series	Paul Sun-Hyung Lee	Nominated	
2020	8th Canadian Screen Awards	Best Lead Actress, Comedy Series	Jean Yoon	Nominated	
2020	8th Canadian Screen Awards	Best Supporting Actor, Comedy Series	Andrew Phung	Won	
2020	8th Canadian Screen Awards	Best Supporting Actress, Comedy Series	Nicole Power	Nominated	
2020	8th Canadian Screen Awards	Best Guest Performance, Comedy Series	Amanda Brugel	Won	
2020	8th Canadian Screen Awards	Best Costume Design	Ruth Secord, "Appanticitis"	Nominated	
2020	8th Canadian Screen Awards	Best Casting	Deirdre Bowen	Nominated	
2021	9th Canadian Screen Awards	Best Comedy Series		Nominated	
2021	9th Canadian Screen Awards	Best Lead Actor, Comedy Series	Paul Sun-Hyung Lee	Won	
2021	9th Canadian Screen Awards	Best Lead Actress, Comedy Series	Jean Yoon	Nominated	
2021	9th Canadian Screen Awards	Best Supporting Actor, Comedy Series	Andrew Phung	Won	
2021	9th Canadian Screen Awards	Best Guest Performance, Comedy Series	Amanda Brugel	Won	
2021	9th Canadian Screen Awards	Best Casting	Deirdre Bowen	Nominated	
2021	9th Canadian Screen Awards	Best Photography in a Comedy Series	James Klopko, "Couch Surfing"	Won	
2021	9th Canadian Screen Awards	Best Editing in a Comedy Series	Aren Hansen, "Couch Surfing"	Nominated	
2021	9th Canadian Screen Awards	Best Direction in a Comedy Series	Siobhan Devine, "Beacon of Truth"	Nominated	
2021	9th Canadian Screen Awards	Best Writing in a Comedy Series	Anita Kapila, "Which Witch is Which"	Nominated	
2021	9th Canadian Screen Awards	Best Writing in a Comedy Series	Kurt Smeaton, "Knife Strife"	Nominated	
2022	10th Canadian Screen Awards	Best Comedy Series		Nominated	
2022	10th Canadian Screen Awards	Best Lead Actor, Comedy Series	Paul Sun-Hyung Lee	Won	
2022	10th Canadian Screen Awards	Best Lead Actor, Comedy Series	Simu Liu	Nominated	
2022	10th Canadian Screen Awards	Best Lead Actress, Comedy Series	Jean Yoon	Won	
2022	10th Canadian Screen Awards	Best Lead Actress, Comedy Series	Andrea Bang	Nominated	
2022	10th Canadian Screen Awards	Best Supporting Actor, Comedy Series	Andrew Phung	Won	
2022	10th Canadian Screen Awards	Best Guest Performance, Comedy Series	Ben Beauchemin	Nominated	
2022	10th Canadian Screen Awards	Best Direction in a Comedy Series	Siobhan Devine, "Who's Pranking Who?"	Nominated	
2022	10th Canadian Screen Awards	Best Photography in a Comedy Series	James Klopko, "Cookie Monster"	Nominated	
2022	10th Canadian Screen Awards	Best Editing in a Comedy Series	Aren Hansen, "Appa & Linus"	Nominated	

== Scholarly reception ==
Kim's Convenience, in like manner as Degrassi Junior High decades earlier, has been analyzed and critiqued by a number of Canadian Studies scholars within CanLit. Unlike Degrassi, however, uptake was immediate. Prof. Christine Kim (UBC English Language & Literatures) offers a cultural reading of Korean-Canadian tropes in the show in a number of venues, including Canadian Literature. She depicts the show as a sophisticated, inclusive, diasporic presentation and negotiation of hyphenated Canadians at the examine of Korean-Canadians.
