= Fountaineer =

Fountaineer is a portmanteau of "Fountain" and "Engineer" – Hydraulic engineer.

Fountaineer describes one who designs, explores, or is passionate about fountains and their design, operation, and use. In addition, the Fontainiers made the water pipes from lead, the restoration of which, from the point of view of monument preservation, is the responsibility of today's fountain masters.

== Fountaineers ==
Notable fountaineers include:

- André Le Nôtre: Gardens of Versailles; others.
- Lawrence Halprin: Keller Fountain Park; Freeway Park; Franklin Delano Roosevelt Memorial; others.
- Dan Euser: Sankofa Square; proposed World Trade Center memorial fountains [world's largest human-made waterfall]
- Jeff Chapman: fountaineer-ing as subject.
- Jean Tinguely + Niki de Saint Phalle: Stravinsky Fountain; others..
- WET Design: Fountain of Nations; Salt Lake 2002 Olympic Cauldron Park; Fountains of Bellagio; others.

== See also ==
- Fountain (Duchamp)
- Fountains in Paris
- List of fountains in Rome
- Category: Fountains
- Category: Outdoor sculptures
