= You're My Hero (web series) =

Canadian comedy web series

- Genre: Comedy
- Created by: Sean Towgood
- Written by: Sean Towgood; Cassidy Civiero; Kevin Wallis
- Directed by: Kara Harun; Greg Jeffs
- Starring: Sean Towgood; Vas Saranga; Tina Jung; Tara Spencer-Nairn; Ali Hassan; George Alevizos
- Country of origin: Canada
- Original language: English
- No. of seasons: 2
- No. of episodes: 13

Production
- Executive producers: Lucy Stewart; Sean Towgood; Kevin Wallis; Cassidy Civiero
- Cinematography: Vanesa Millado
- Running time: 15–20 minutes
- Production company: Longhope Media Inc

Original release
- Network: CBC Gem
- Release: March 24, 2023 – March 14, 2025

You're My Hero is a Canadian comedy web series, which premiered in 2023 on CBC Gem. The series stars Sean Towgood as Ian, a young man with cerebral palsy navigating the pressures of establishing his adult life as a wheelchair user.

The cast also includes Tina Jung, Vas Saranga, Tara Spencer-Nairn, Christian Smith, George Alevizos, Joanne Latimer, Cassidy Civiero, Julie Nolke, Gwynne Phillips, Sharjil Rasool, Rob Baker, Jillian Rees-Brown, Jason Huska, Masini McDermott, Lenoxcia Sutherland, Maieko Sagara and Ali Hassan.

Jung and Spencer-Nairn both received Canadian Screen Award nominations for Best Supporting Performance in a Web Program or Series at the 12th Canadian Screen Awards in 2024.

On July 31, 2024, Canadian professional wrestler Chris Jericho confirmed a second season had been filmed and would premiere in 2025. Jericho will also make a guest appearance in the new season.

== Release ==
You're My Hero was first announced in February 2023, and released on CBC Gem the following month. In February 2025, it was announced that all six episodes of season 2 would premiere on March 14, in honor of National Cerebral Palsy Awareness Month. It was also announced that wrestler Chris Jericho and comedian Colin Mochrie would guest star.

== Awards and nominations ==
Award	Year	Category	Nominee(s)	Result	Ref.
Canadian Screen Awards	2024	Best Supporting Performance, Web Program or Series	Tina Jung	Nominated	
Canadian Screen Awards	2024	Best Supporting Performance, Web Program or Series	Tara Spencer-Nairn	Nominated	
Canadian Screen Awards	2026	Best Lead Performance, Web Program or Series	Sean Towgood	Pending	
Canadian Screen Awards	2026	Best Web Program or Series, Fiction	You're My Hero	Pending	
Golden Sheaf Awards	2025	Best Series	You're My Hero	Nominated	
