= Kamaj Silva =

Canadian entrepreneur and musician

Kamaj Silva කමාජ් සිල්වා
- Born: Maneksha Kamaj Silva; April 9, 1983 (age 43); Mount Lavinia, Sri Lanka
- Education: S. Thomas’ College
- Alma mater: Staffordshire University; Centennial College
- Occupations: Entrepreneur, businessman, musician
- Years active: 2011–present
- Spouse: Roshani Silva
- Parents: Kamal Silva (father); Manel Silva (mother)
- Musical career
- Genres: Pop; soul; rhythm and blues; Alternative rock
- Instruments: Vocals, Guitar
- Years active: 2009–present

Maneksha Kamaj Silva (born 9 April 1983 as කමාජ් සිල්වා [Sinhala]), is a Canadian entrepreneur and serial sneakerhead as well as a musician. He is the founder and CEO of Sneakertub, the world's first and only sneaker subscription service delivering a monthly package of several world-renowned commercial shoe brands.

== Personal life ==
Kamaj Silva was born on 9 April 1983 in Mount Lavinia, Sri Lanka as the only child of the family. His father Kamal Silva was a company director who died when he was a teenager. His mother Manel Silva was a housewife who also died. He completed his education at S. Thomas’ College, Mount Lavinia. During school times, he played basketball and volleyball.

He is married to his longtime partner, Roshani.

== Career ==
In 2003 he went England for higher studies and graduated with a bachelor's degree in computer science from Staffordshire University. After graduation in England, he arrived in Canada in 2007 and attended Centennial College to complete Masters' in Film in 2011. He began the Children's Media Program's internship component. First, he interned at Phase 4 Films along with university professors, where he soon became a full-time children's media marketing coordinator. Later, he was promoted as the promotions manager where he continued to work for 18 months. Then he joined with Entertainment One as marketing manager, where he worked for three years.

He is also a vocalist, and a composer, working as an independent musician specializing in alternative rock, soul blues and pop music. In 2010, he sang the popular song Wang Hung which made his mark in his music career. Then in 2015, he released the song Makaru.

His passion for shoes came when he saw Michael Jordan play in Nikes. After he appeared on the national show Dragons’ Den on the Canadian Broadcasting Corporation (CBC) in 2017, he explained the difficulties in establishing himself as an entrepreneur. In 2016, he first started with a job as a marketing manager in Toronto. After few years of working, he founded the business called Sneakertub, starting with just $700 and creating a website within just two days. He also owns a milk & cereal themed streetwear boutique called Milk, located in Toronto. The boutique is famous for selling and promoting major international brands as well as products from Canadian brands. In 2019, the boutique won the award for Best New Fashion Store at the Toronto Awards Festivals. Silva started a marketing agency Reeljoy.io in 2023 and scaled it to 6 figured in 6 months. His networth is assumed to be between $2 million and $5 Million

Apart from his businesses, Silva also works with a Sri Lankan tech company called Alavi. In the meantime, he is also popular as a YouTuber, where he hosts multiple shows such as the Daiya Show, Happy Hour, Api Nodanna Business and Kamaj Podcast.

In April 2022, Silva and fellow Sri Lankan-born Canadian entrepreneur Chanuka Wijesundara developed the website Lankan Square. This is the first website created for Sri Lankan citizens in Canada that supports information related to businesses, religious events, concerts, festivals, seminars and workshops in Canada.
