= Tina Jung =

Korean-Canadian actress

- Born: Christina Jung; South Korea
- Education: York University (BFA)
- Occupations: Actress, writer, producer
- Years active: 2009–present

Tina Jung (Hangul: 정유빈, Jung Yu-bin) is a Korean-Canadian actress. She is most known for her role as Sam in the web series You're My Hero (2023–2025), for which she was nominated for a Canadian Screen Award at the 12th Canadian Screen Awards in 2024.

She has also had a regular role in the television sitcom Strays (2021–2022) and the lead role in the drama film Queen of the Morning Calm, as well as guest appearances in the Nickelodeon series Make It Pop (2015–2016) and the Omni TV sitcom Second Jen (2021), among others.

== Early life and education ==
Jung was born in South Korea, but grew up in Burlington, Ontario and attended M. M. Robinson High School. Both her parents were actors in South Korea before immigrating to Canada. As a child, she starred in various plays at school and community theater, and danced for over ten years. She later graduated with a Bachelor of Fine Arts from the Acting Conservatory at York University, where she was the recipient of the Performing Arts Award and Award in Acting. She also received the Sandra Oh Acting Award from the Korean Canadian Scholarship Foundation. Shortly after graduation, she signed with her first agent and began her acting career.

== Career ==
In 2017, Jung and actor Simu Liu co-wrote and co-starred in the 2017 short film Meeting Mommy. She later starred in the drama film Queen of the Morning Calm, which premiered at the 2019 Whistler Film Festival. She was nominated for Best Actress at the 2021 BronzeLens Film Festival for her performance in the film.

In 2020, she appeared in the Hallmark Christmas movie Heart of the Holidays. The following year, she joined the third season of the Omni TV sitcom Second Jen. From 2021 to 2022, she starred in the CBC sitcom Strays, a spin-off of Kim's Convenience. She also appeared in the Lifetime thriller film Galentine's Day Nightmare. Jung later appeared in the sci-fi horror film Firestarter, a remake of the 1984 film of the same name.

From 2023 to 2025, she starred in the CBC Gem comedy series You're My Hero. She was nominated for Best Supporting Performance in a Web Program or Series at the 12th Canadian Screen Awards for her performance. As of December 2025, she was in talks to star in the film Get Over It, an adaptation of the supernatural comedy novel Getting Rid of Rosie by Lynda Simmons.

== Personal life ==
As of 2020, Jung lives in Downtown Toronto. She has a dog named Maple.

== Filmography ==
=== Film ===
Year	Title	Role	Notes
2009	Halcyons End	Laura	Short film
2013	Bad Therapy	Girl at Bar	Short film
2016	A Nutcracker Christmas	Coffee Shop Clerk	TV movie
2017	Meeting Mommy	Christine	Short film
2017	Jigsaw	Expecting Mother	
2018	No Sleep 'Til Christmas	Vivian	
2019	Queen of the Morning Calm	Debra	
2020	Heart of the Holidays	Marina	TV movie
2021	Galentine's Day Nightmare	Tiffany Adler	TV movie
2021	Love Upstream	Mallory	TV movie
2021	Mani Pedi	Emily	Short film
2022	Firestarter	Ms. Gardner	
2025	A Change in Heart	Kelsey Nguyen	TV movie
2025	A Firefighter's Christmas Calendar	Candice Lee	TV movie

=== Television ===
Year	Title	Role	Notes
2013	The Fifth Estate	Lucia Jang	Episode: "The Last Great Escape"
2015	Man Seeking Woman	Katie	Episode: "Dram"
2015	12 Monkeys	Hostess	Episode: "Shonin", uncredited
2015–2016	Make it Pop	Ko Hye Jung	8 episodes
2015	Saving Hope	Mika Chieng	Episode: "All Down the Line"
2015	The Expanse	Wasted Girl	Episode: "CQB"
2016	Beauty and the Beast	Student Jennifer	Episode: "Monsieur et Madame Bete"
2016	Kim's Convenience	Jeanie Park	Episodes: "Best Before" and "Family Singing Contest"
2018	Crawford	Jade	Episode: "The Quiet One"
2018	In Contempt	Diane Wong	Episode: "Welcome to Hell"
2018	Carter	Patty Lentl	Episode: "Pig, Man, Lion"
2018	Suits	Bridget	Episode: "Right-Hand Man"
2019	Good Witch	Olivia	Episode: "The Prince"
2020	Odd Squad	Symmetric Alice	Episode: "Odd Squad in the Shadows"
2021	Second Jen	Vicky Yang	Episode: "Sense & Sensuality" and "In Session"
2021	Nine Films About Technology	Young-Ae	Episode: "An Old Video Plays at a Wedding"
2021–2022	Strays	Joy	Main role
2022–2024	Shoresy	Carrie	3 episodes
2023	Transplant	Sepi	Episode: "The Luxury of Memory"
2023–2025	You're My Hero	Sam	13 episodes
2023	Hudson & Rex	Nina Tabilo	Episode: "Hour of the Dog"
2025	Saint-Pierre	Stephanie Jung	Episode: "Ghost From The Past"
2025	Murdoch Mysteries	Lara Kim	Episode: "He Ain't Heavy, He's My Brother"

=== Video games ===
Year	Title	Role
2015	Tom Clancy's Rainbow Six Siege	Cheon-Sa
2021	Riders Republic	Suki

== Awards and nominations ==
Award	Year	Category	Nominated work	Result	Ref.
ACTRA Award	2022	Outstanding Performance - Gender Non-Conforming or Female Voice	Riders Republic	Nominated	
BronzeLens Film Festival	2021	Best Actress	Queen of the Morning Calm	Nominated	
Canadian Screen Awards	2024	Best Supporting Performance, Web Program or Series	You're My Hero	Nominated	
