= Andes Yue =

Hong Kong radio and television presenter (born 1978)

- Traditional Chinese: 余宜發
- Simplified Chinese: 余宜发
Transcriptions
Standard Mandarin
- Hanyu Pinyin: Yú Yífā
Yue: Cantonese
- Jyutping: jyu4 ji4 faat3

Andes Yue Yi Fat (Chinese: 余宜發, born 6 February 1978) is a radio DJ and TV presenter in Hong Kong, nicknamed 發仔 (pronounced faat jai in Cantonese). He went to Centennial College in Toronto, Ontario, Canada to study architectural drafting and worked as a TV host for a Cantonese weekend show on multicultural station CFMT-TV (now OMNI2) in the early 1990s. Yue is currently a radio personality for the Hong Kong radio station CRHK (Commercial Radio Hong Kong). He has been at CRHK since the mid-1990s, and hosts their overnight program Begin With Music from Monday to Friday, but also has his own Sunday morning program on CR1 (881) called Fat's Breakfast (發式早餐). On television, he hosts a music show on TVB's Music Channel, "型人型樂館 (內容簡介)", which is only available on cable channels in Hong Kong.

== Interviews ==
He has interviewed many famous Cantopop and Mandopop singers including Dave Wong, Faye Wong, Leon Lai, Andy Lau, Sandy Lam, Eason Chan, Stephanie Cheng, Joey Yung, the late Leslie Cheung, Leehom Wang, Stephy Tang, Alex Fong, Janice Vidal, S.H.E, Twins, 2R, Vanness Wu and Kangta. His interviews are usually aired during CRHK's Begin With Music late on Monday night or early Tuesday morning.

== Begin With Music ==
Andes has been on the overnight program since December 2005. The program is aired from 2-6am in Hong Kong on CRHK's CR2 (903) and then 3-6am on CR1 (881). During "Begin With Music", Andes welcomes listeners from Hong Kong and overseas to become a part of his 'family', "Fat's Family" (發仔大家庭).

== Other media appearances ==
Yue sang a duet with Jade Kwan called "一起感動過".
