= Ninjalicious =

Canadian urban explorer (1973–2008)

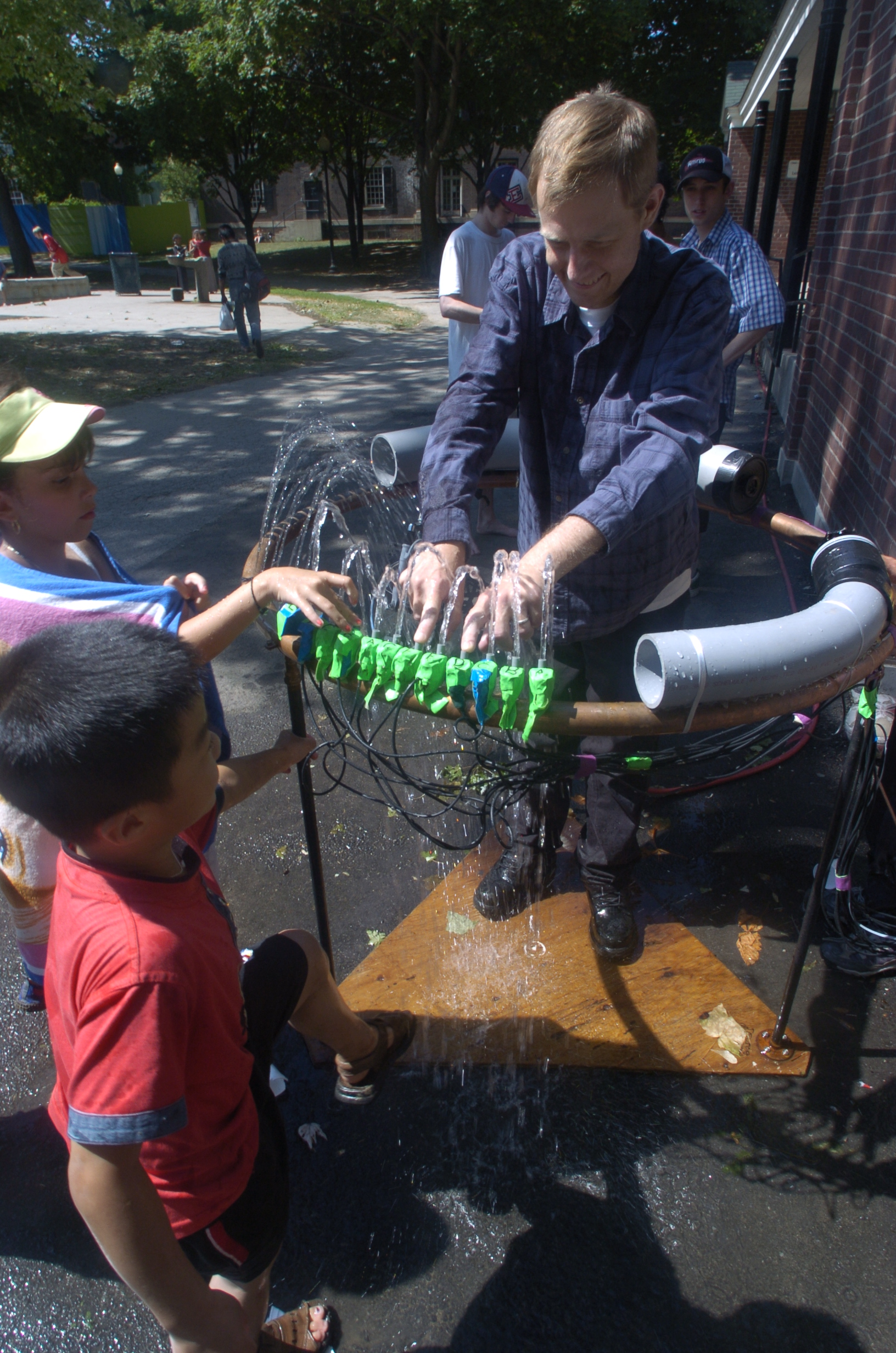
- Chapman playing in a fountain (hydraulophone having electrical amplification) on the afternoon of Sat. 2005 July 9th, in Grange Park
- Born: Jeff Chapman; September 19, 1973; Scarborough, Ontario, Canada
- Died: August 23, 2005 (aged 31); Toronto, Ontario, Canada
- Cause of death: Cholangiocarcinoma
- Education: Centennial College
- Occupation: Writer
- Years active: 1996-2005
- Known for: Urban exploration
- Spouse: Liz Chapman

Jeff Chapman (September 19, 1973 – August 23, 2005), better known by the pseudonym Ninjalicious, was a Toronto-based urban explorer, fountaineer, writer and founder of the urban exploration zine Infiltration: the zine about going places you're not supposed to go. He was also a prominent author and editor for YIP magazine, as well as its website, Yip.org.

Chapman died of cholangiocarcinoma on Tuesday, August 23, 2005 at the age of 31 — three years after a successful liver transplant at Toronto General Hospital (a location he loved to explore). Doctors claimed that Chapman's illness was caused by coming into contact with carcinogens during exploration, but his wife confirmed that Chapman had been diagnosed with auto-immune diseases well before he became an avid explorer. It was his extended stays at hospitals that got him hooked on exploring institutions. She expressed her belief that his exploration did not directly cause his death.

== Background ==
Chapman attended York University in the early 1990s and later studied book and magazine publishing at Centennial College. He went on to serve as Editor at History Magazine and as Director of the Toronto Architectural Conservancy board.

== Works ==
Access All Areas book authored by Ninjalicious.

Chapman first published Infiltration in 1996. In total, 25 issues were published — covering such urban exploration topics as the navigation of storm drains, evading hotel security and adventuring through abandoned military shelters. He also launched infiltration.org, an online version of the zine, in 1996.

His book, Access All Areas: a user's guide to the art of urban exploration, was published in July 2005, shortly before his death. The book serves as a how-to-guide to urban exploration — covering topics from basic stealth and concealment, to social engineering techniques to ethics. Chapman is credited with coining the term "credibility prop", which describes a device, piece of equipment or other appurtenances used solely to reduce suspicion if one is encountered in a normally restricted area. A specific example of "credibility prop" is simply being wet (wetness being a good credibility prop for infiltration of a hotel pool). He was also featured in CBC Newsworld's program BIG Life showing him exploring Toronto.

Jeff and his wife Liz were both interview subjects in the film BBS: The Documentary as participants in the Toronto BBS community and other early online communities. He is credited under the handle Milky, though he was also known as Milky Puppy online.
