= Centennial College (Canada) =

Public college in Toronto, Canada

Centennial College of Applied Arts and Technology
- Coat of arms of the college
- Other name: Centennial College
- Motto: Transforming lives and communities through learning
- Type: Public college
- Established: 1966; 60 years ago
- Academic affiliations: CBIE; CICan
- President: Craig Stephenson
- Students: 26,000 full-time; 19,000 part-time (2025: 11,608 FTEs)
- Location: Toronto, Ontario, Canada; 43°47′08″N 79°13′41″W
- Campus: Urban
- Colours: Green
- Nickname: Colts
- Sporting affiliations: CCAA – OCAA
- Mascot: Bolt the Colt
- Website: centennialcollege.ca
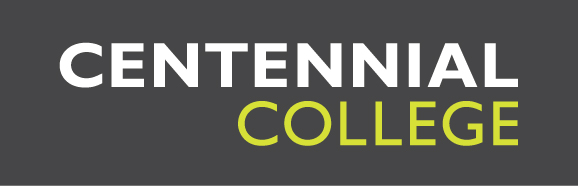

The Centennial College of Applied Arts and Technology, operating as Centennial College, is a public college in Toronto, Ontario, Canada. It is the oldest publicly funded college in Ontario. Its campuses are situated on the east side of the city, particularly in Scarborough, with an aerospace centre at Downsview Park in North York.

Centennial College has been recognized as a culturally diverse post-secondary institution; almost 100 ethno-cultural groups are represented and 80 languages are spoken on campus. Its main research facilities are its Wearable, Interactive and Mobile Technologies Access Centre in Healthcare, established in 2015 through a $1.75 million federal grant and its aerospace innovation hub, under construction at the former de Havilland plant in west-end Toronto.

== Programs ==
Centennial offers more than 260 programs, including bachelor's degrees, diplomas, certificates, post-graduate certificates and apprenticeship programs, across many fields of study.

Founded in 1966, the college offers programs in business, communication arts, community and consumer services, applied computing, engineering technology, health sciences, animation, music, theatre, film and design. Centennial College supports enrolments of 22,000 full-time students and 19,000 part-time students.

== History ==
Centennial College was the first community college to be opened in Ontario during the formation of the province's public college system in the 1960s. Ontario Colleges of Applied Arts and Technology was established on May 21, 1965, under the direction of the Hon. William Davis, Minister of Education. The system has grown to encompass 24 public colleges serving 200 provincial communities. As Centennial College's first site, Warden Woods Campus opened on October 17, 1966, with 514 students enrolled in 16 career-oriented programs, including journalism, secretarial science, and early childhood education. The campus used a decommissioned federal building that had been renovated to serve as a teaching institution. It evolved into health/nutrition, hospitality, child studies, and community service programs. In 1973, the Ontario government transferred responsibility for nursing education from the province's hospitals to its colleges. Locally, the Scarborough Regional and the Toronto East General nursing schools joined Centennial College to form the School of Health Sciences, based at Warden Woods Campus.

In 1992, the Scarborough Board of Education and the college established an adult education centre, the Scarborough Career Planning Centre, at the Centennial College. In 1994 the entities agreed to establish the centre there beginning in the fall of that year. Centennial College proliferated, necessitating the establishment of additional campuses in the east end of Toronto to accommodate new programs and students. Warden Woods Campus closed in autumn of 2004 and was demolished for a housing development. Most programs were relocated to the Centennial Science and Technology Centre (now Morningside Campus), which began operations the same year.

Centennial College opened a campus in China in 2016, the first approved institution teaching a Canadian curriculum in the country. In 2018 Centennial had the highest number of international student visas of any post-secondary institution in Canada. Ontario Auditor General Bonnie Lysyk identified the reliance on international student tuition as a "risky formula", in 2021, with Centennial College being the Toronto-area college most reliant.

== Campuses ==
Existing campuses are located at:

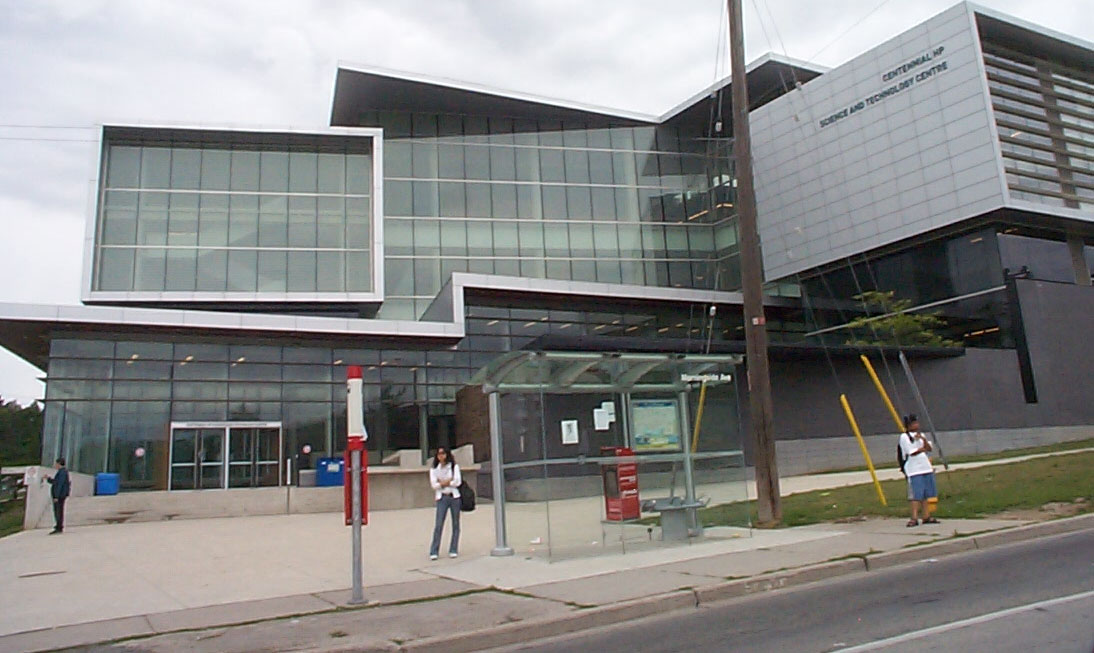
Morningside Campus

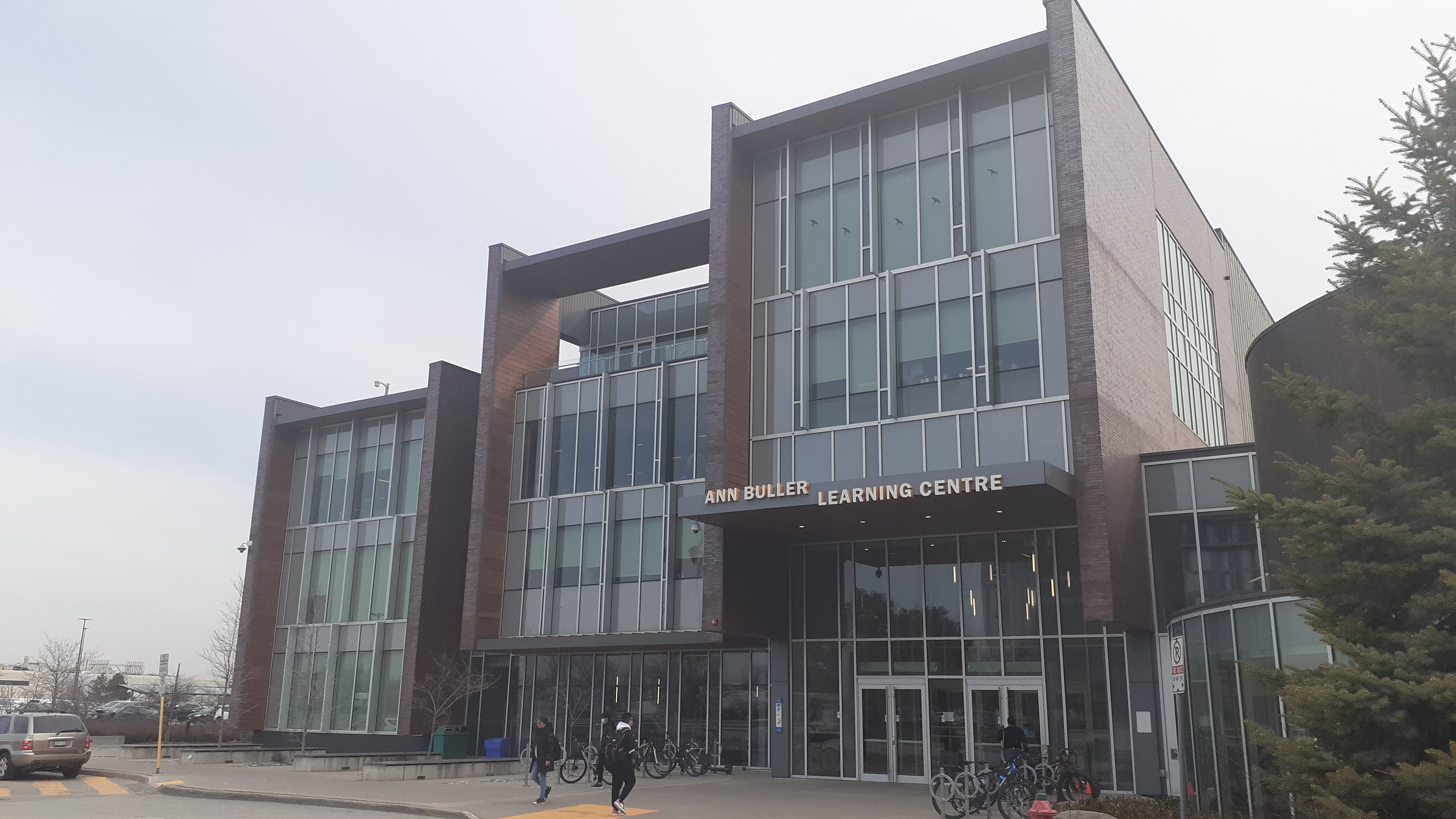
Progress Campus

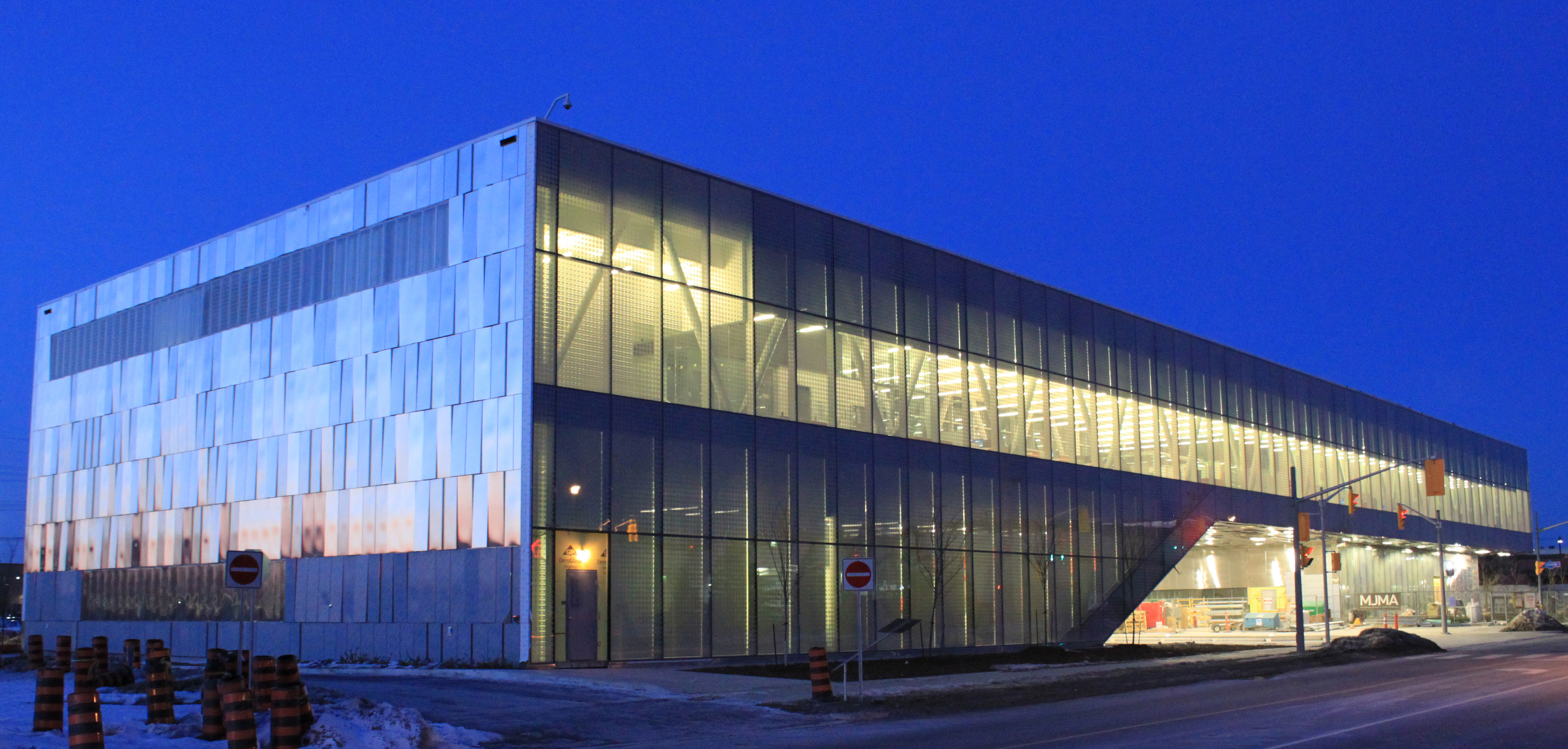
Ashtonbee Campus

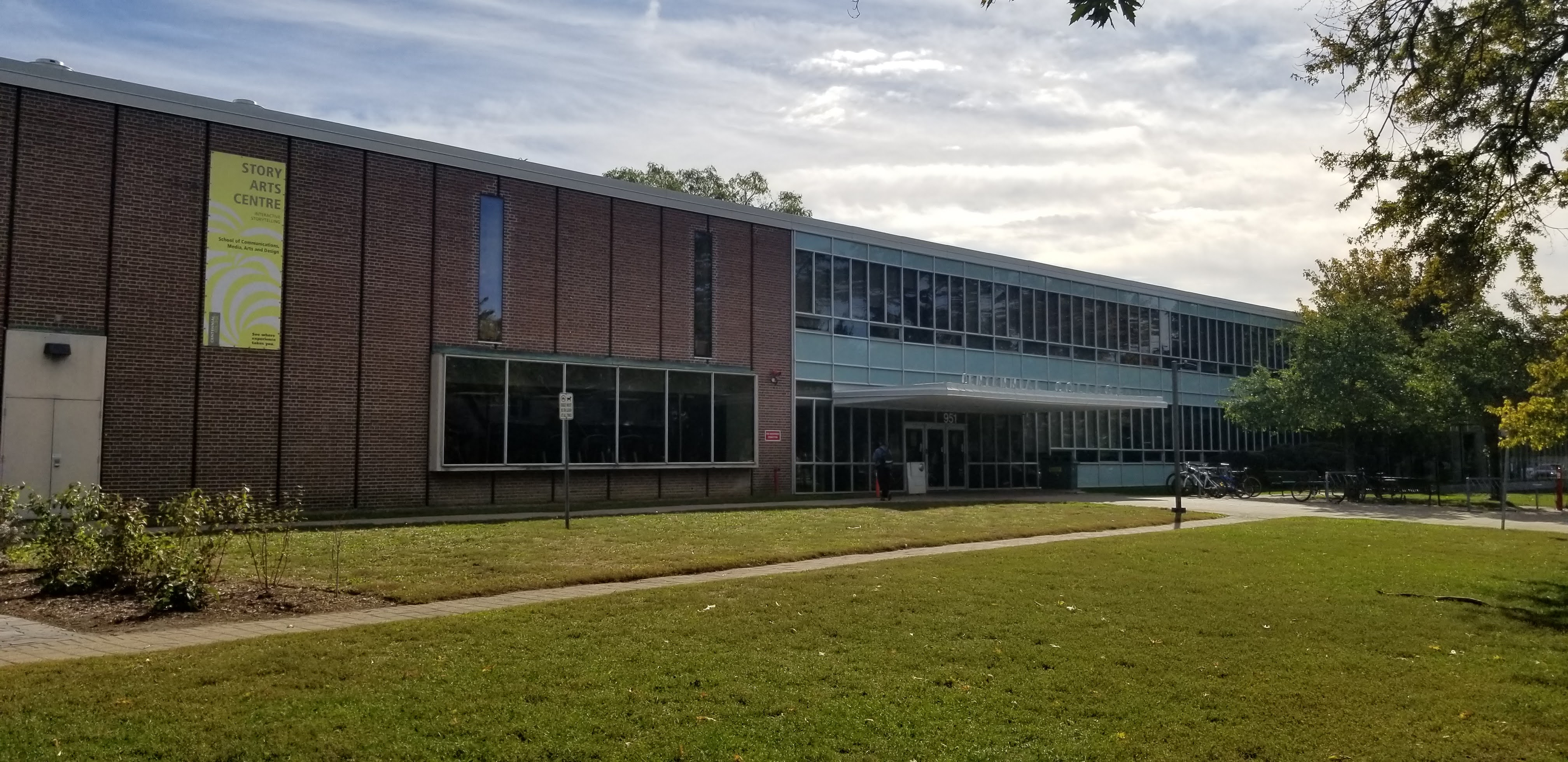
Story Arts Centre Campus

=== Morningside Campus ===
Located in Scarborough, Morningside Campus (previously Centennial College HP Science and Technology Centre) opened in the summer of 2004 to house joint programs with the nearby University of Toronto Scarborough. The campus operates health science and environmental science programs, architectural technology, biotechnology, personal support workers, paramedics, pharmacy technology, environmental technology, massage therapy, and others.

=== Progress Campus ===
Progress Campus in Scarborough is Centennial's largest campus. The programs offered there (located at 941 Progress Avenue, near Markham Road and Highway 401), are in computer science and technology, business, hospitality, and culinary arts. Students in the latter often work as hospitality staff/chefs in the student restaurant, The Local, or in the Student Centre kitchen run by the Centennial College Student Association Incorporated (CCSAI). Progress Campus is the site of a Library and Academic Facility and an expanded Athletic and Wellness Centre, both of which opened in September 2011.

It's also home to the Centennial Event Centre, a multi-use venue for special events, corporate meetings and social functions. It is located on the top floor of the new Centennial student residence, which opened in August 2016 and replaced an older facility. The "A Block" (located on 939 Progress Avenue) of the campus was built in 1994 by the Scarborough Board of Education to house the students from Scarborough Centre for Alternative Studies adult secondary school.

=== Ashtonbee Campus ===
Located at 75 Ashtonbee Road in Scarborough, this campus houses the automotive services technician, career and college transition, motive power technician, auto body repair technician, general arts and science, and other programs. Ashtonbee Campus is regarded as one of the largest transportation technology training centres in North America.

In 2017, Ashtonbee Campus' library renovation project was one of 10 winners in the 2017 Ontario Association of Architects Awards Design Excellence division.

=== Downsview Aerospace Hub ===
In November 2016, work on the $72 million Downsview Park Aerospace Campus officially got underway with a groundbreaking ceremony attended by Ontario Premier Kathleen Wynne and federal Hon. Minister of Science Kirsty Duncan. With joint funding from the provincial and the federal government, the aerospace campus is being built on the site of the former de Havilland Aircraft Company Ltd. assembly plant in Downsview Park, Toronto. Centennial College is a partner in the Downsview aerospace consortium, DAIR, along with the University of Toronto, York University, Toronto Metropolitan University (formerly Ryerson University), and eight companies including Pratt and Whitney Canada, FlightSafety, Canadensys, UTC Aerospace Systems, MDA, Safran Landing Systems, Honeywell and Bombardier Aerospace.

In May 2017, Centennial College received $2.3 million in funding from the Natural Sciences and Engineering Research Council of Canada (NSERC) to research electric landing gear for energy-efficient aircraft.

=== Suzhou Centennial College ===
In 2016, Suzhou Centennial College (SCC) officially launched. It is the first Canadian college approved by the Chinese government to deliver Canadian education in China. Suzhou Centennial College offers 18 programs, including four Centennial programs providing Canadian credentials in accounting, finance, software engineering, and business foundations.

=== Warden Woods (Closed) ===
Warden Woods Campus located at 651 Warden Avenue was formerly the Canadian Arsenals Limited plant, acquired in 1964. It closed in 2004 with site mostly demolished in 2005 and now a residential development. The historic Bell Estate c. 1830 has been preserved.

=== Story Arts Centre (Closed) ===
Located near the Danforth at 951 Carlaw Avenue in East York, this campus opened in 1996 to house Centennial's award-winning School of Communications, Media, Arts, and Design, a "premiere media and visual arts learning center" in the region according to the East York Foundation. Taught here were most of the creative communication programs such as advertising and public relations, as well as professionally oriented programs in the arts, such as digital animation and game design. The School of Communications, Media, Arts, and Design also offers performance programs, including Theatre Arts and Performance, Music Industry Arts and Performance, Dance Performance, and Performing Arts Fundamentals. The performance programs are housed in leased space at the Daniels Spectrum in downtown Toronto. The building housing the Story Arts Centre was built to house the Toronto Teachers' College in 1955 and television buffs may know it as the location of the Canadian TV teen drama Degrassi High in the early 1990s. Since the closure of Toronto's francophone Collège des Grands-Lacs in 2002, Collège Boréal, a francophone college based primarily in Sudbury, also offered some French-language college programs at this facility until moving to its new campus at One Yonge Street in 2012. Story Arts Centre has been closed as of the end of the summer, 2026. The creative programming portfolio has been moved to Progress Campus as of fall 2026.

== School of Hospitality, Tourism and Culinary Arts, Event Centre and Residence ==
Responding to a critical shortage of affordable rental accommodations in Toronto at the time, Centennial College purchased the Howard Johnson Plaza Hotel Toronto East in June 2001 across the street from the Progress Campus and converted the hotel building into a college residence in time for the fall semester. The amenities and level of finish in the hotel building were considerably higher than that of many purpose-built college residences. Amenities included an indoor pool, glass elevator, four-story atrium, and warmly decorated rooms. The Centennial College Residence and Conference Centre was originally configured to accommodate 380 student residents, based on two students sharing a room, though later configurations allowed the creation of some single-occupancy rooms.

Rapid enrolment growth, fuelled by international students, compelled the college to examine building a new residence on the Progress Campus property. The resulting eight-story quadrangle building was designed to house 740 students in two- and four-bed suites, complete with a bathroom and kitchen in every suite, with all residents having their private bedrooms. The new building is a hybrid: the ground floor is dedicated to Centennial's School of Hospitality, Tourism, and Culinary Arts, complete with seven kitchen labs, eight classrooms and a restaurant and cafe (The Local) open to the public. The conference and center located on the top floor can accommodate up to 450 guests. Construction broke ground in October 2014 and the residence began occupancy in August 2016. Knightstone Capital Management provided the planning, financing and management of the project; other key partners include Diamond Schmitt Architects, Canadian Campus Communities and FRAM Building Group.

== Academics ==
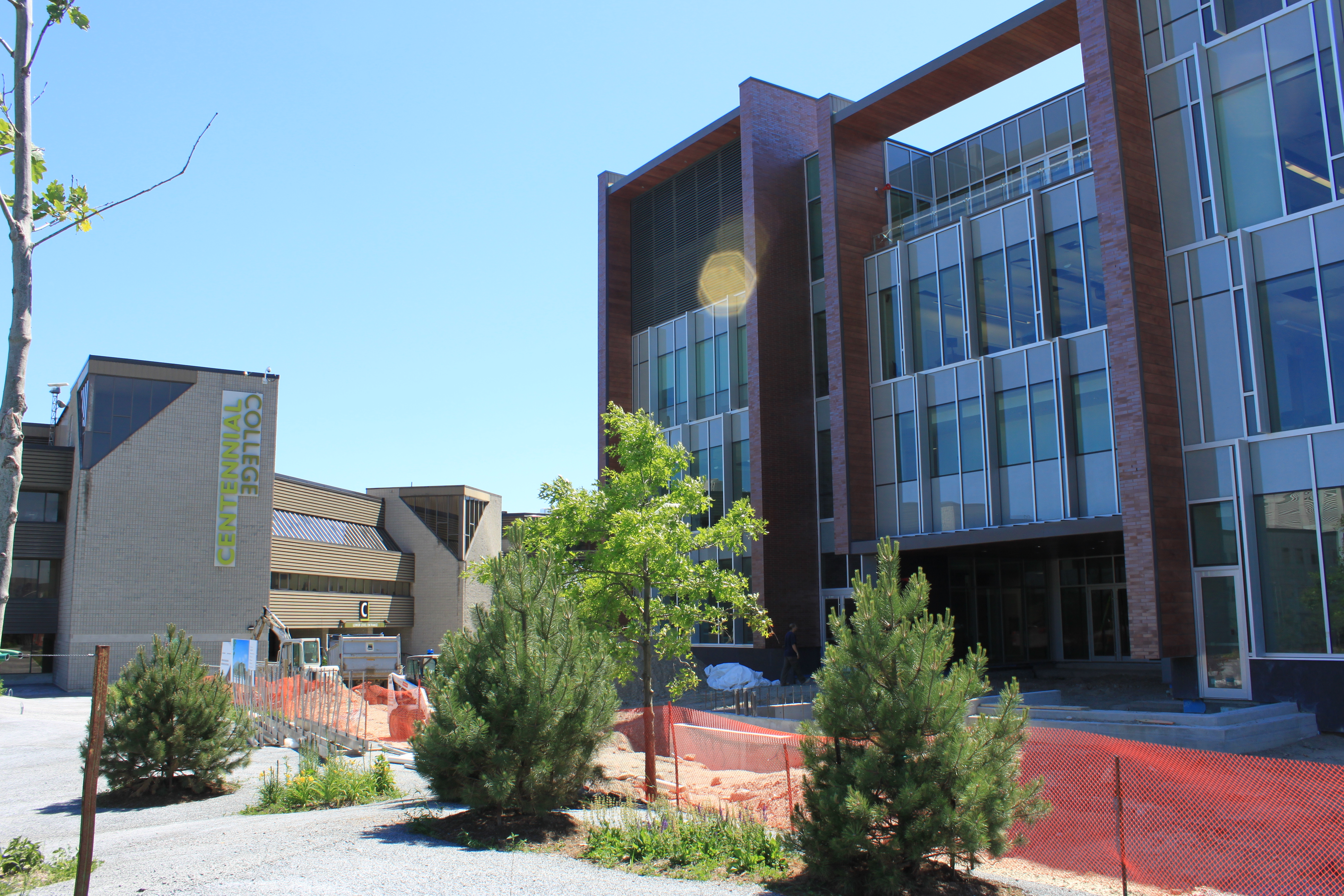
New Library and Academic Facility (now Ann Buller Learning Centre) at Progress Campus, Centennial College

Centennial College offers full-time programs in more than 100 fields of study. These programs emphasize experiential learning with laboratory instruction, paid cooperative education opportunities, and industry and agency field placements. All Centennial programs are developed and kept current with the assistance of program advisory committees (PACs), made up of faculty advisors and employer representatives. Their participation ensures the education and skills students receive at Centennial are up-to-date and relevant to the industry they are preparing to enter. Centennial offers a variety of innovative degree programs. Five joint-degree programs in paramedicine, journalism, new media studies, environmental science & technology, and applied microbiology are taught in conjunction with the University of Toronto Scarborough, and the Bachelor of Science Nursing program is delivered jointly with Toronto Metropolitan University. Centennial was among the first colleges in Ontario to receive approval for applied-degree programs in computer and communication networking, and software systems: design, development, and management.

=== Centennial College Faculties and Schools ===
- Faculty of Lifelong Learning and Industry Training (formerly School of English and Liberal Studies, and before that, School of Advancement))
- Faculty of Global Business and Creative Industries (formerly The Business School, the School of Communications, Media Arts and Design, & School of Hospitality, Tourism and Culinary Arts)
- Faculty of Integrated Health and Community Care (formerly the School of Community and Health Studies)
- Faculty of Applied Sciences, Engineering Technology, Trades and Transportation (formerly School of Engineering, Technology and Applied Science & School of Transportation)

== Community and special events ==
In July 2010, the students in the School of Hospitality, Tourism, and Culinary Arts participated and partnered for the first time with North America's Largest Cultural Festival – The student wearing the costume was interviewed by CP24 and various other television stations and media affiliates. In July 2011, the students made a return to the Scotiabank Caribbean Carnival Festival and participated in the King and Queen show.

In April 2017, Centennial College's "Paint the Town Green" celebration won the "Best Event Produced for a Corporation by an In-house Team" award at the Canadian Event Industry Awards Gala, held in Vaughan, Ontario. Thousands of volunteers went to 11 major cities of Toronto and planted trees, spread mulch, and removed trash from waterways and nature trails.

== Notable alumni and faculty ==
- Aaron Badgley – music journalist
- Eric Bauza, voice actor and comedian
- Diana Cabrera, sports shooter
- Diana Capponi, mental health activist
- Elinor Caplan, businesswoman and politician
- John Candy, comedy actor
- Jeff Chapman (Ninjalicious), urban explorer and writer
- John Child, Olympic athlete
- John Cooper, author and corporate communication specialist
- Joe Daniel, politician
- Jeffrey Dvorkin, journalist
- Tobias Enverga, Canadian senator
- Mario Ferri, municipal councillor of Vaughan
- Robert Fisher, journalist
- John Gray, politician
- Michaele Jordana, musician
- Arin King, footballer
- Ashley Diana Morris, model and actress
- Nailah Rowe, footballer
- Kamaj Silva, businessman
- Gabriella Sundar Singh, actress
- Fred Stone, music educator
- Jennifer Valentyne, television personality
- Andes Yue, television presenter

== See also ==
- Higher education in Ontario
- List of colleges in Ontario
