= Queen of the Morning Calm =

2019 film

- Official release poster
- Directed by: Gloria Ui Young Kim
- Written by: Gloria Ui Young Kim
- Produced by: Gloria Ui Young Kim; Josh Barsky
- Starring: Tina Jung; Eponine Lee; Jesse LaVercombe
- Cinematography: Dmitry Lopatin
- Edited by: Orlee Buium; Michelle Szemberg
- Music by: Stephen Krecklo
- Production companies: Gloryous Productions; Hawkeye Pictures
- Release date: December 7, 2019 (Whistler)
- Running time: 86 minutes
- Country: Canada
- Language: English

Queen of the Morning Calm is a 2019 Canadian drama film written and directed by Gloria Ui Young Kim in her feature directorial debut. The film stars Tina Jung as Deborah, a single mother in Toronto who is struggling to raise her daughter Mona (Eponine Lee) while the girl's father Sarge (Jesse LaVercombe) moves in and out of their lives unpredictably and unreliably.

The film was in development for several years. Kim won the Telefilm Canada New Voices Award at the Toronto Screenwriting Conference in 2013 for its screenplay, but struggled to secure sufficient funding to make the film until she won the $200,000 Feature Film Award from Women in the Director's Chair in 2016. The film finally went into production in November 2018.

Queen of the Morning Calm premiered at the Whistler Film Festival on December 7, 2019, and was subsequently screened at the Canadian Film Festival on May 29, 2020, where Kim won the awards for William F. White Reel Canadian Indie and Best Director, while Lee won for Best Breakout Performance.

== Critical response ==
For Exclaim!, Angela Morrison praised the film, writing that "The film is technically accomplished and meticulously shot, perfectly capturing the chilly streets, cozy shops and small apartment spaces of Toronto. Scenes of Mona and Debra dragging their belongings through the city streets evoke the alienation and sense of precarity that comes with being a single mother and a sex worker in a big city, experiences that are often excluded within the canon of Toronto-set indie rom-coms (i.e. The F Word, Take This Waltz), a fact that Kim recognizes and begins to rectify in telling this deeply personal, resonant story."

Chris Knight of the National Post rated the film 3.5 stars out of 5, writing that "Queen of the Morning Calm delivers a nuanced portrayal of inner-city Toronto – neither beautiful nor horrifying – and of a young woman trying to make her way in it."
