= Nicole Power =

Canadian actress

- Born: Nicole Penney Power; November 24, 1989 (age 36); St. John's, Newfoundland and Labrador, Canada
- Occupation: Actress
- Years active: 2013-present
- Known for: Kim's Convenience; Strays
- Children: 1

Nicole Penney Power (born November 24, 1989) is a Canadian actress, best known for her role as Shannon Ross in Kim's Convenience and its spin-off series Strays.

== Early life and education ==
Power was born in St. John's, Newfoundland and Labrador and grew up in Middle Cove. She attended Memorial University of Newfoundland for one year of general studies before moving to Ontario, where she graduated from Sheridan College's Musical Theatre program and Second City's conservatory. Power also became a member of Soulpepper Theatre Academy.

== Career ==
Power has appeared in Canadian stage productions of West Side Story, Bonnie and Clyde, Legally Blonde, La Cage aux Folles, Dog Sees God: Confessions of a Teenage Blockhead, Evangeline, and The Charlottetown Festival's production of Anne of Green Gables: The Musical.

She is a two-time Canadian Screen Award nominee for Best Supporting Actress for her role as Shannon in Kim's Convenience, receiving nominations at the 6th Canadian Screen Awards in 2018 and at the 8th Canadian Screen Awards in 2020.

In 2021 she was announced as the star of Strays, a spinoff of Kim's Convenience which will see Shannon Ross move to Hamilton, Ontario to embark on a new career. In 2023, she starred in the Netflix show Glamorous.

== Filmography ==
=== Film ===
Year	Title	Role	Notes
2020	Nocturne Falls	Jema	Short film
2020	The Toll	Clara	Uncredited
2022	Pattern	Sam	

=== Television ===
Year	Title	Role	Notes
2013	Splatalot!	Faetal	22 episodes
2016–2021	Kim's Convenience	Shannon Ross	65 episodes
2020	Christian & Nat		Episode: "We Got Divorced"
2020	Private Eyes	Melissa	Episode: "Gumbo for Hire"
2021–22	Strays	Shannon Ross	20 episodes
2021	Let's Get Married	CJ	Television film
2022	Designing Christmas	Zoe	Television film
2022–23	Something Undone	Officer Puddester	4 episodes
2023	The Drop	Lisa	Episode: "Monolith"
2023	Glamorous	Mykynnleigh	7 episodes
2024	Run the Burbs	Lisa	Episode: "Phirst Love"
