= Gabriella Sundar Singh =

Canadian actress

- Born: Toronto, Ontario, Canada
- Occupation: Actress

Gabriella Sundar Singh is a Canadian actress best known for her role as Chelsea Chettiar on the Canadian comedy show Kim's Convenience and her work at the Shaw Festival.

== Early life ==
Singh was born and raised in Toronto, Ontario. In addition to her acting career, she is also a trained Bharathanatyam dancer.

== Education ==
She attended the University of Guelph, and graduated from the School of English and Theatre Studies in 2011, majoring in Theatre Studies with an Honours degree. She then pursued post-graduate studies in Children's Entertainment at Centennial College. Later, she attended the National Theatre School of Canada from 2014 to 2017.

== Career ==
=== Television ===
She appears in episodes of Kim's Convenience, Taken, Frankie Drake Mysteries, Brothers in the Kitchen, and Designated Survivor.

=== Stage ===
She has performed in the Shaw Festival, in Prince Caspian, The Playboy of the Western World, The Russian Play, Brigadoon, and O’Flaherty V.C. She was also the director for Sisterhood (Secret Theatre, 2018).
