= Jean Yoon =

Canadian actress and poet (born 1962)

- 윤진희
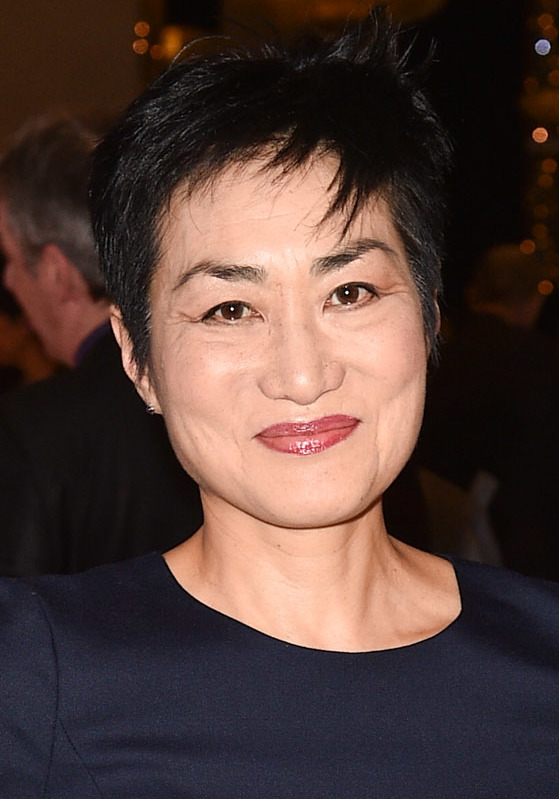
- Yoon in 2018
- Born: May 4, 1962 (age 64); Champaign, Illinois, U.S.
- Education: University of Toronto (BA)
- Occupations: Actress, writer
- Years active: 1998–present
- Children: 1

- Jean Yoon
- Hangul: 윤진희
- Hanja: 尹真姬
- RR: Yun Jinhui
- MR: Yun Chinhŭi

Jean Yoon (Korean: 윤진희; born May 4, 1962) is an American and Canadian actress and writer. An actress of Korean descent, Yoon is best known for originating the role of family matriarch Umma in the 2011 play Kim's Convenience and in the award-winning CBC Television series adapted from the play, for which she won an ACTRA Award and received two Canadian Screen Award nominations.

== Early life ==
Yoon was born in Champaign, Illinois to parents of Korean descent in 1962 and subsequently raised in Toronto, where she currently resides and works.

== Career ==
=== 1980s–1990s: Early career in theatre ===
Yoon started her career in theatre as an actress in the early 1980s, but soon quit in frustration after she struggled to find work and went on to complete her degree at the University of Toronto (BA Innis 1989). A decade later, in 1995, she returned to acting and started her own group called Loud Mouth Asian Babes, through which she has written and produced plays that focus on the Korean diaspora, mostly in Canada.

=== 2000s: Transition into television and film ===
Yoon's acting career began to flourish in the early 2000s, with small roles in several television series, including La Femme Nikita (1996–2001), Witchblade (TNT, 2000–2002) and Street Time (Showtime, 2001–2003). In 2006, Yoon achieved wider recognition after playing flight attendant Betty Ong in the controversial mini-series The Path to 9/11. Also in 2006, Yoon had a recurring role as June Kim in the legal drama series This Is Wonderland.

In 2007, Yoon received a Gemini Award nomination for her work in the CBC mini-series Dragon Boys. In 2009, she portrayed Dr. Montague in the hit romantic comedy film The Time Traveller's Wife, based on the novel of the same name.

=== 2010s–present: Further success in television ===
Throughout the 2010s, Yoon has played a wide array of characters in several television programs, most notably Imena Khumalo in the medical drama series Remedy (2014–2015), Connie in the animated series Peg+Cat (2013–2016), Captain Theresa Yao in the science fiction series The Expanse (2015), and Janis Beckwith in the hit BBC-Space series Orphan Black.

==== Kim's Convenience ====
From 2016 to 2021, Yoon portrayed Kim Yong-mi ("Umma"), the matriarch of the Kim family, in the CBC sitcom Kim's Convenience. She also portrayed the same role in the 2011 play, which she originated and performed over 240 times in six cities.

For her role in the television series, she has received considerable attention and has publicly discussed the importance of diversity in mainstream media, specifically for Asian Canadians and immigrants. In an interview with the CBC, Yoon said:

The generational conflict between first generation and second generation immigrants, it's rich territory, and if you've lived through it, I mean, it's laugh and cry, laugh and cry, laugh and cry. But we haven't seen those stories on television on a national level. We are starting to see those stories coming out in novels and in theatre ... We are starting to see an awareness that this is territory that hasn't been explored. There's comedy there, there's talent there, and there's a sudden pop of interest. But also it's a question of critical mass.

For her role on Kim's Convenience, Yoon won an ACTRA Award, and was a five-time Canadian Screen Award nominee for Best Actress in a Comedy Series, winning at the 10th Canadian Screen Awards in 2022. Yoon played the role for the show's entire five-season run.

=== Other work ===
Yoon is also a writer and playwright. She has written several plays, poems, and essays, including The Yoko Ono Project, a multi-media performance art comedy about Ono, her art, and her impact, which earned a Dora Mavor Moore Award nomination and a Jessie Richardson Award.

In December 2022, Yoon and retired South Korean competitive figure skater Yuna Kim were designated honorary ambassadors on the occasion of the 60th anniversary of the diplomatic relations between Canada and South Korea in 2023.

At the 14th Canadian Screen Awards in 2026, Yoon won the award for Best Supporting Performance in a Web Program or Series, for her role as Harriet in 18 to 35.

== Filmography ==
=== Film ===
Year	Title	Role	Notes
2006	Cow Belles	Corrinne	
2009	The Time Traveler's Wife	Dr. Montague	
2013	Empire of Dirt	Tess	
2013	Wedding Palace	Mi Sook	
2016	Rupture	Colette	
2020	Nocturne Falls	Whitney	Short film
2021	The Voyeurs	Dr. Sato	
2024	Code 8: Part II	Mina	
2024	Darkest Miriam	Irene Frenkle	
2025	Tuner	Dr. Madeline Richard	
2026	California Scenario	Nancy	

=== Television ===
Year	Title	Role	Notes
1998	La Femme Nikita	Ying Kam	Episode: "Not Was"
1999	Animorphs	Watch Customer (uncredited)	Episode: "The Front"
2001–2002	Witchblade	Coroner's Assistant	Episode: "Emergence" (2002), "Sacrifice" (2001)
2002	Street Time	Dr. Whitsell	Episode: "The Truth Hurts... Bad"
2002–2003	Odyssey 5	Dr. Lynn Chen	Episode: "Skin", "The Vanishing Point"
2005–2006	This Is Wonderland	June Kim	Recurring role
2006	The Path to 9/11	Betty Ong	
2007	Dragon Boys	Belinda Lok	
2008	Instant Star	Elizabeth	Episode: “She Walks on Me”
2009	Being Erica	Mrs. Li	Episode: “Cultural Revolution”
2010	Lost Girl	Commanding Officer	Episode: “Faetal Attraction”
2012	Little Mosque on the Prairie	Tenant	Episode: "The Worst of Times"
2014	Remedy	Imena Khumalo	Recurring role
2015	The Expanse	Captain Theresa Yao	Episode: "CQB", "Remember the Cant"
2013–2016	Orphan Black	Janis Beckwith	Recurring role
2013–2016	Peg + Cat	Connie	Main role
2017	Dark Matter	Dr. Hajek	Episode: "It Doesn't Have To Be Like This"
2018	In Contempt	Judge Pinkner	2 episodes
2019	Street Legal	Mercedes Orr	Episode: "Leap"
2016–2021	Kim's Convenience	Young-Mi Kim (Umma)	Main role
2021	Nurses	Willow Chen	Episode: "A Thousand Battles"
2023	The Horror of Dolores Roach	Joy	4 episodes
2024–present	Mistletoe Murders	Sue Shin	Main role
2025	Wylde Pak	Halmoni (voice)	Main role
2025	Your Friends and Neighbors	Sandra	Episode: "This Tourist Has Balls"
2025	18 to 35	Harriet	

== Personal life ==
Yoon has a son; in a 2017 interview with NOW Magazine, she described herself as a "mom who acts."
