= John Doyle (critic) =

Canadian writer

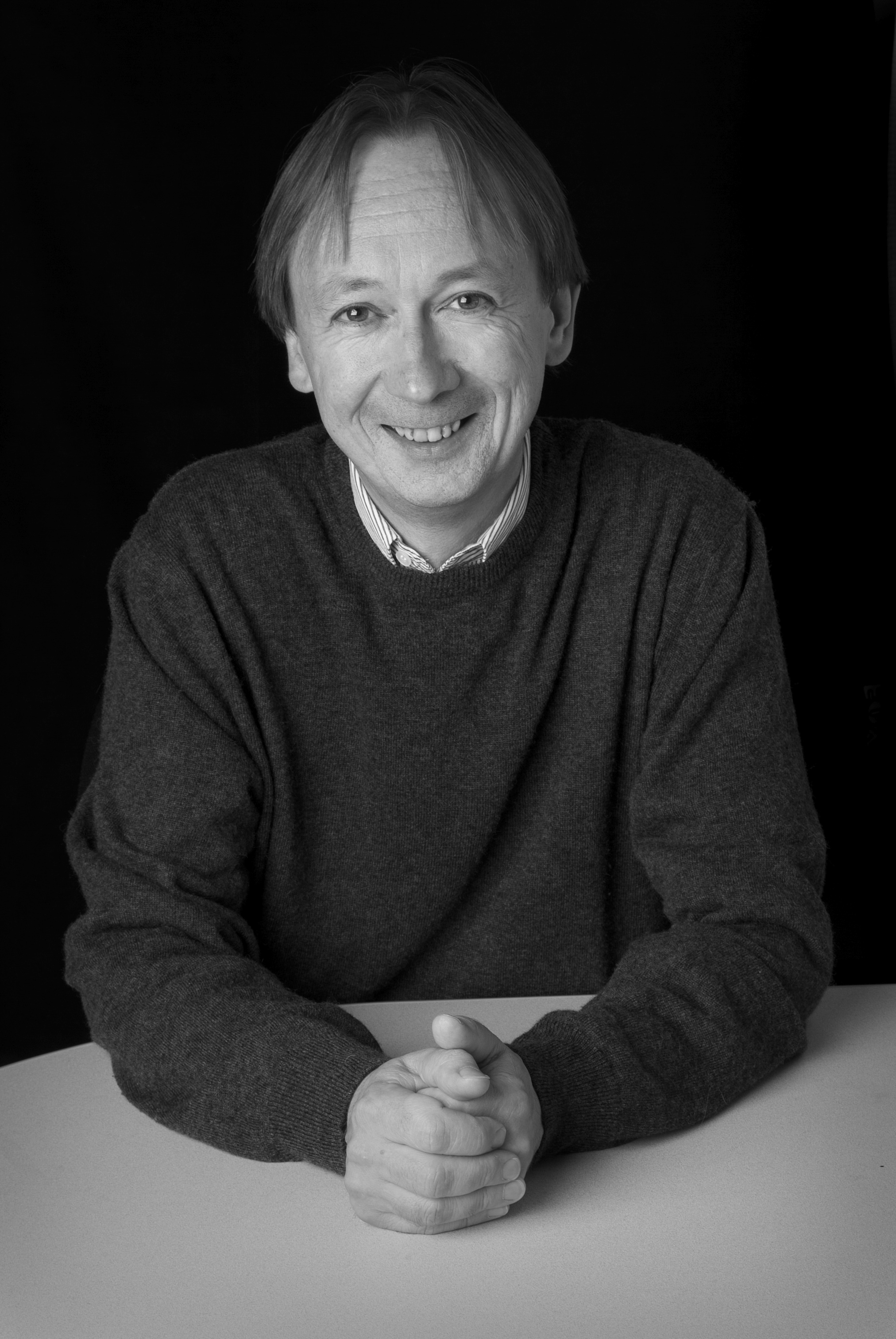
- Doyle in 2005
- Born: 1957 (age 68–69); Nenagh, County Tipperary, Ireland
- Occupations: Television critic, author

John Doyle (born 1957) is a Canadian writer who was a television critic at The Globe and Mail from 2000 until his retirement in 2022.

== Early life ==
John Doyle was born in 1957 in Nenagh, County Tipperary, Ireland, and came to Canada in 1980.

== Career ==
Doyle was first hired by The Globe and Mail in 1995 to write for Broadcast Week, the paper's weekly television listings, as a columnist. In 2000, he was appointed the newspaper's daily television critic. Doyle also covered soccer for the paper. His writing on soccer has appeared in The New York Times, The Guardian, the ECW Pressanthology Best Canadian Sports Writing, and the soccer magazine Eight by Eight.

In 2005, Doyle published his first book, the memoir A Great Feast of Light: Growing Up Irish in the Television Age about his early life in conservative rural Ireland, and the book The World is a Ball: The Joy, Madness, and Meaning of Soccer in 2010. Doyle has covered multiple FIFA World Cups, UEFA European Championships, and FIFA Women's World Cups.

In 2004 he was involved in a public disagreement with Bill O'Reilly, then of Fox News. O'Reilly complained about Doyle's writing on his TV show. An article Doyle published in 2010 argued that the Giller Prize and Gemini Awards were elitist. In a 2017 review of The Great Canadian Baking Show, Doyle called Dan Levy "fey". Levy and some critics argued that Doyle's use of the term was homophobic.

== Bibliography ==
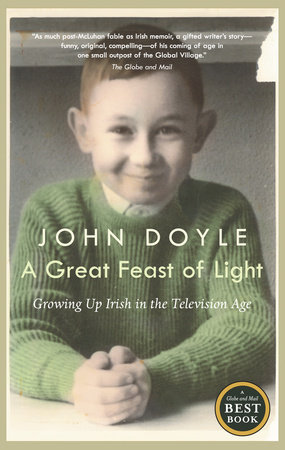
- Cover of the Canadian and US editions of A Great Feast of Light
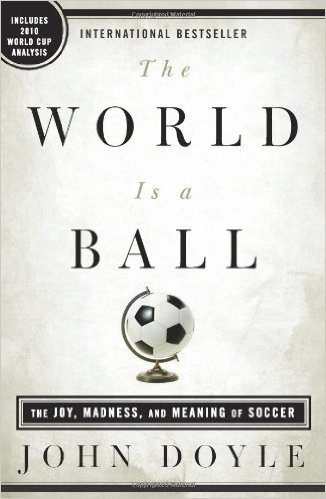
  Cover of the US edition of The World is a Ball
  Doyle, John (2005). A Great Feast of Light: Growing Up Irish in the Television Age. Random House of Canada. ISBN 978-0-385-66042-6.
- ——— (2010). The World Is a Ball: The Joy, Madness and Meaning of Soccer. Doubleday Canada. ISBN 978-0-385-66498-1.

== See also ==
- List of newspaper columnists
