= Workin' Moms season 2 =

Season of television series

Workin' Moms
- Season 2
- Starring: Catherine Reitman; Dani Kind; Juno Rinaldi
- No. of episodes: 13

Release
- Original network: CBC
- Original release: December 19, 2017 – April 10, 2018

Season chronology
- ← Previous; Season 1 Next → Season 3

The second season of Workin' Moms, the Canadian comedy television series, was renewed by CBC on April 4, 2017.

Workin' Moms is a Canadian television sitcom whose second season premiered on CBC Television on December 19, 2017. The show stars Catherine Reitman, Dani Kind, and Juno Rinaldi, with Jessalyn Wanlim being demoted to recurring status from season one. as a group of friends dealing with the challenges of being working mothers. The series is produced by Wolf + Rabbit Entertainment, the production company of Reitman and her husband, Philip Sternberg.

== Cast ==
=== Starring ===
- Catherine Reitman as Kate Foster
- Dani Kind as Anne Carlson
- Juno Rinaldi as Frankie Coyne
- Philip Sternberg as Nathan Foster
- Ryan Belleville as Lionel Carlson
- Sadie Munroe as Alice Carlson
- Dennis Andres as Ian Matthews

=== Recurring ===
- Jessalyn Wanlim as Jenny Matthews
- Sarah McVie as Valerie "Val" Szalinsky
- Katherine Barrell as Alicia Rutherford
- Peter Keleghan as Richard Greenwood
- Kevin Vidal as Mo Daniels
- Oluniké Adeliyi as Giselle Bois
- Jess Salgueiro as Mean Nanny/Renya
- Amanda Brugel as Sonia
- Aviva Mongillo as Juniper
- Cristopher Redman as Brad Heshington
- Jennifer Pudavick as Gena Morris

=== Guest ===
- Jann Arden as Jane Carlson
- Mary Ashton as Sarah Hoffman
- Alden Adair as Marvin Grimes
- Tennille Read as Bianca Thomas

== Episodes ==
No. overall	No. in season	Title	Directed by	Written by	Original release date
14	1	"2005"	Catherine Reitman	Catherine Reitman	December 19, 2017
In 2005, Anne plans to marry Brad Heshington, a psychiatrist and professor. Anne expresses reluctance to marry Brad and seeks advice from Kate, who admits that she thinks Brad is controlling. Anne has a complicated relationship with her estranged mother Jane, who seems to be disapproving of Anne and Brad's engagement. Eleanor reprimands Kate for bringing a married man to the wedding as her date. At the wedding reception, Kate meets Nathan for the first time, while Anne bonds with Lionel. Kate kisses Nathan, and the two frolic in the hall's outdoor water fountain in front of the wedding patrons.
15	2	"Good Mom"	Paul Fox	Catherine Reitman	January 9, 2018
Six months after leaving Victoria Stromanger's meeting in Montreal, Kate has been put on forced hiatus from Gaze and struggles as a stay-at-home mom. Desperate to return to work full-time, Kate returns to Gaze to confront Richard, who allows her to work as a part-time consultant; she is upset, but accepts his offer. Charlie's daycare teacher expresses concern to Kate about Charlie's walking development. Anne wants Lionel to get a vasectomy, only to discover that Lionel had already secretly gotten a vasectomy months prior. A newly single Frankie is offered a job at the ladies' wellness center she is attending, although she is also reprimanded for having sex with numerous patients. Kate receives a phone call from Eleanor and Sarah informing her that her father has died.
16	3	"The Sign"	Paul Fox	Catherine Reitman	January 16, 2018
As the Foster family deals with the recent death of Kate's father, Anne confronts Kate for neglecting to inform her about her father's death. Ian, now separated from Jenny, joins the mom group under the suggestion of Val. While working on his screenplay, Ian bonds with Sonia, a friendly coffee shop barista, and asks her on a date. Feeling unfulfilled in her new part-time position at Gaze, Kate applies for a new job at Baseline, a hipster marketing company, and lies about her background during the interview. Following the discovery of Lionel's vasectomy, Anne and Lionel have begun an intense sexual relationship. Frankie quits her job at the wellness center after a patient's suicide attempt. She later visits Giselle, only to discover that Giselle has moved on in a new relationship.
17	4	"The Holy Hole"	Paul Fox	Hannah Cheesman & Catherine Reitman	January 23, 2018
Anne begins therapy sessions at her new office building, but she is horrified to discover that her ex-husband Brad is performing hypnotherapy sessions in the same building; the two have an awkward reunion. Anne does not inform Lionel about her discovery, and is later seen reflecting on her old wedding pictures. Kate tries to balance "having it all" as she continues her part-time job at Gaze while starting her new job at Baseline; her critiques and suggestions regarding a client impresses her colleagues at Baseline. Frankie moves in with her brother and niece and jumps back into the dating pool, pursuing a relationship with two different women: the wealthy and possessive Dorothy, who gives Frankie a makeover, and the young and naive Juniper, who initiates a sexual encounter with Frankie at the local pool.
18	5	"Consent"	Molly McGlynn	Robby Hoffman & Rebecca Kohler	January 30, 2018
Anne agrees to do a hypnotherapy session with Brad and secretly records the session on her phone. While listening to the recording, Anne discovers that Brad had tried to hypnotize her with sexual thoughts. Alice finds Anne's old wedding pictures and discovers that Anne and Lionel are not legally married. Ian seeks advice from the mom group about his recent relationship with Sonia; Sonia later gives Ian permission to consummate their relationship. Kate gets intoxicated at Baseline and pitches a social media marketing campaign to her colleagues, who dismiss the idea. Kate then returns to Gaze and presents the same marketing campaign for Richard's clients. That night, Kate is stunned to discover that Baseline and Gaze have launched the exact same social media campaign at the same time.
19	6	"Shame Spiral"	Philip Sternberg	Jillian Locke	February 6, 2018
Richard places Gaze on lockdown, believing somebody in the office had leaked Kate's social media campaign. Kate remains silent during the investigation, and Rosie is mistakenly blamed and fired as a result. Frankie continues her sexual relationship with Dorothy, who offers to let her move in; Frankie later discovers that Dorothy is a dominatrix. Alice questions Anne and Lionel's relationship after discovering that they are not married, while Anne vengefully begins to shift things in Brad's office. Anne is furious when Kate misses a lunch date and fails to respond to her subsequent phone calls. She later sees Kate biking on the street and lambasts her for failing to prioritize their friendship. Kate returns home and runs into Anne's mean nanny, whom Nathan had hired to babysit Charlie. She offers to give Kate a tarot card reading, during which she warns Kate of an impending betrayal.
20	7	"Retreat"	Paul Fox	Karen Moore & Kathleen Phillips	February 27, 2018
The members of Val's Toddler Time group attend a mandatory weekend-long outdoors retreat; the retreat brings out surprising truths about love and friendship, and unexpected revelations between the members. Kate tries to reconcile her friendship with Anne, but Anne is hesitant to forgive her. While having lunch with the group, Alicia's daughter experiences a severe allergic reaction. Anne, who has had an openly hostile relationship with Alicia, comforts Alicia and reassures her that she is a great mother. Ian experiences a sexual issue and seeks advice from Anne and Frankie; Anne advises Ian to get tested for an STD, stating that he either caught it from Sonia or Jenny.
21	8	"Red Handed"	Catherine Reitman	Rebecca Kohler	March 6, 2018
When Gaze begins losing clients because of the social media campaign incident, Richard arranges a meeting with Baseline and discovers that Kate has secretly been working for their company. Upon this revelation, Kate gets fired from both Gaze and Baseline. Dorothy is upset to discover Frankie's sexual relationship with Juniper, leading Frankie to break up with Juniper. Ian tests positive for chlamydia and consults with Jenny, only to discover that he actually caught it from Sonia; the revelation unexpectedly brings Ian and Sonia closer. Ian discovers that his movie screenplay has been sold. Anne and Lionel become concerned when Alice has her first boyfriend, and Anne hides a camera in Alice's room to ensure that they are not having sex. Alice later discovers the camera and records a fake hostage video with her boyfriend intended to shock Anne.
22	9	"Spirit Animal"	Aleysa Young	Karen Moore	March 13, 2018
Fired by Gaze and Baseline, a depressed and unemployed Kate spends her day watching TV and taking care of Charlie. She ends up spending the day with Alice, and tries to assist her when Alice suddenly experiences her first period. Giselle agrees to help Frankie's financial troubles by buying out Frankie's half of the house, and expresses interest in officially divorcing. Realizing she needs to be self-sufficient for her daughter, Frankie moves out of Dorothy's house. Brad manipulates Anne into guest-lecturing for his students at the university, knowing Anne has a fear of public speaking. A hesitant Anne initially pulls the building's fire alarm, but she later successfully goes through with the lecture outside, surprising Brad. Anne thanks Kate for taking care of Alice; Kate finally opens up emotionally to Anne, and the two repair their friendship.
23	10	"Cuck"	Aleysa Young	Rebecca Kohler	March 20, 2018
Kate meets with Richard to explain her decision to work at Baseline. Richard acknowledges that Victoria's ultimatum was unfair and implies that Kate should reach a settlement for gender discrimination. Kate successfully acquires a lucrative pay settlement after threatening to expose Victoria's ultimatum to the press, and she works towards creating her own public relations business with Rosie. Anne grows annoyed by Carly, an obsessive fan inspired by her university lecture. Lionel visits Anne and is angered to discover that Anne had not informed him that Brad is working in the same building. While meeting with movie studio producers, Ian abruptly leaves when Jenny is arrested for leaving Zoe in a car. After getting released, Jenny expresses her mixed feelings about being a mother to Ian, and suggests he get full custody of their daughter.
24	11	"Trash Panda"	Aleysa Young	Karen Moore	March 27, 2018
Kate goes to her doctor for night sweats, during which the doctor uncovers a small lump in her armpit. Though she initially fears she has cancer, Kate discovers she is actually going through perimenopause. Frankie, who has temporarily moved in with Kate, returns to her job as a real estate agent. Anne takes Lionel on a hike and proposes to him; he gently declines, believing that she is compensating for not informing him about Brad. Upon discovering that Carly has begun taking Brad's hypnotherapy sessions, a concerned Anne reveals Brad's predatory behavior to Lionel, letting him listen to the recording of her hypnotherapy session. Lionel wants to report Brad's sexual assault to the police, but Anne instead decides to create a community event for women who were hypnotized by Brad, posting an advertisement on social media.
25	12	"If Women Had to Give Birth"	Aleysa Young	Catherine Reitman	April 3, 2018
Frankie moves into her new house and meets her lesbian neighbor Bianca. Kate and Rosie get their business up and running, and Kate receives her first one-off job. Kate reveals the news to Nathan, but he reprimands her for keeping her in the dark about her business and perimenopause. Ian finds out that Sonia, traumatized by her past miscarriages, feels uncomfortable around Zoe; Sonia ultimately decides to break up with him to ease the pain. Kate and Anne organize the community event for Brad's hypnotherapy victims. Anne initially fears that no one will show up, but is eventually approached by two of Brad's students, who emotionally reveal that they were sexually assaulted and manipulated by Brad during his hypnotherapy sessions. The three women then report Brad's behavior to the dean; Brad is subsequently fired from his job as a professor and reported to the Medical Council of Canada.
26	13	"Look Back"	Catherine Reitman	Catherine Reitman	April 10, 2018
Kate Foster Public Relations acquires their first official client. Lionel accepts Anne's proposal to organize a small commitment ceremony; Anne invite numerous family members and friends, including the mom group. Sonia visits Ian to reconcile, and Ian invites Sonia to Anne's ceremony as his date; Sonia shows a willingness to bond with Zoe, which pleases Ian. At the ceremony, Anne is pleased to see her mother Jane in attendance, and they reconcile. Kate tells Nathan of her desire to have a second child, and the two have sex in the bathroom. Later, Kate tries to find Nathan but sees him consoling and kissing Anne's nanny, revealing that Nathan has been having an affair. Returning from the ceremony, Kate discovers that her ovulation test is positive.

== Reception ==
On Rotten Tomatoes, season 2 has an approval rating of 91% based on reviews from 34 critics. Which was a 14% increase from season 1.
