= Workin' Moms season 4 =

Season of television series

Workin' Moms
- Season 4
- Starring: Catherine Reitman; Dani Kind; Juno Rinaldi; Jessalyn Wanlim; Sarah McVie
- No. of episodes: 8

Release
- Original network: CBC
- Original release: February 18 – April 7, 2020

Season chronology
- ← Previous; Season 3 Next → Season 5

The fourth season of Workin' Moms, the Canadian comedy television series, aired in 2020.

Workin' Moms is a Canadian television sitcom whose fourth season premiered on CBC Television on February 18, 2020. The show stars Catherine Reitman, Jessalyn Wanlim, Dani Kind, Enuka Okuma, and Juno Rinaldi as a group of friends dealing with the challenges of being working mothers. The series is produced by Wolf + Rabbit Entertainment, the production company of Reitman and her husband, Philip Sternberg.

== Cast ==
=== Starring ===
- Catherine Reitman as Kate Foster
- Dani Kind as Anne Carlson
- Juno Rinaldi as Frankie Coyne
- Jessalyn Wanlim as Jenny Matthews
- Sarah McVie as Valerie "Val" Szalinsky
- Philip Sternberg as Nathan Foster
- Ryan Belleville as Lionel Carlson
- Sadie Munroe as Alice Carlson
- Victor Webster as Mike Bolinksi

=== Recurring ===
- Peter Keleghan as Richard Greenwood
- Aviva Mongillo as Juniper
- Nikki Duval as Rosie Phillips
- Kevin Vidal as Mo Daniels
- Oluniké Adeliyi as Giselle Bois
- Tennille Read as Bianca
- Alex Mallari Jr. as Michael Cody Patrick
- Dennis Andres as Ian Matthews

=== Guest ===
- Jennifer Pudavick as Gena Morris
- Donald MacLean as Forrest Greenwood
- Katherine Barrell as Alicia Rutherford

== Episodes ==
No. overall	No. in season	Title	Directed by	Written by	Original release date
40	1	"Charade"	Catherine Reitman	Catherine Reitman	February 18, 2020
Kate declines Mike's offer to accompany him in Cabo, and instead decides to meet with Nathan. Seven months later, Kate and Mike have continued their business partnership, and Mike's new girlfriend is revealed to be pregnant. Anne forces Alice to participate in multiple extracurricular activities as punishment for her rebellious behavior, and she proposes a new parenting book for publishers. Charlie's teacher approaches Kate and Nathan with concerns about his development, and encourages them to let Charlie be more independent. Kate and Nathan host a housewarming party, inviting Anne, Frankie, Val and their respective partners. Anne is upset to learn that Kate and Nathan are back together, and is openly hostile towards Nathan throughout the party. While playing a game, Nathan breaks down in tears when Kate brings up his infidelity, causing the uncomfortable party guests to leave.
41	2	"Black Sheep"	Philip Sternberg	Jillian Locke	February 25, 2020
Alice, working as an intern at Kate Foster Public Relations, throws a wild party with her friends inside the building; Kate fires her for trashing the office and using up her client Aprés' cannabis beer supply. Lionel tries to teach Alice discipline by taking her to his office, only to learn that he has been laid off. Anne mulls over writing her parenting book when she realizes Alice's punishment is not working. Frankie contacts the donor father of Bianca's son Solomon, who has a disfigured face. Frankie and Bianca are pleased to discover that Sean is attractive, and Bianca bonds with him. Tru Air begins losing customers following an incident involving a mother changing her baby's diaper on the plane. Mike proposes making the flights less baby-friendly, impressing Tru Air but dismaying Kate. At the Aprés launch party, Kate sees the company CEO Craig talking to Mike.
42	3	"The Man in the Mexican Mask"	Philip Sternberg	Kathleen Phillips	March 3, 2020
Kate discovers that Craig and Mike used to be friends, and she is forced to invite Mike on the project when Craig approves of Mike's new proposal, which he had pitched without her permission. Frankie becomes suspicious of Sean and believes he is lying about his background. Jenny has a hostile conversation with Malcolm, another parent, at the local park. After finding out that Ian is making more money than her, Jenny investigates and discovers that her male colleagues are being paid more than her female colleagues. Mike uncovers footage from Alice's party on social media showing her underaged friends drinking Aprés. Kate hires back Alice at Lionel's behest; Alice agrees to get her friends to remove the videos, but claims that a masked man supplied her with the beers. Later, Kate views footage of the party and discovers that Mike was the man who handed out the beers.
43	4	"No One's Coming"	Philip Sternberg	Daniel Gold	March 10, 2020
Tru Air's new "tranquility flight" campaign receives backlash for baby discrimination. Kate lambasts Mike for approving the campaign without consulting her, and confronts him with the video from Alice's party, after which she releases him from the Aprés contract. Tru Air wants to fire Kate, but Mike convinces them otherwise by taking the blame for the campaign. Anne, pressured by her book publishers, tries to push through writer's block. After completing two chapters, Anne asks Kate to celebrate; Kate declines, but Anne later runs into Kate having lunch with her friend Maya. Jenny rallies her female co-workers to protest the gender pay gap. Jenny later meets with Marvin's boss, who is revealed to be Malcolm, and she accepts his offer of a pay raise. Kate and Nathan host a dinner for his parents; they reveal that their house is being foreclosed and ask to move in.
44	5	"To Lure a Squirrel"	Joyce Wong	Daniel Gold	March 17, 2020
Kate and Nathan try to adjust to his parents moving in. Seeking help for her Aprés campaign, Kate meets with Richard and offers him a job, agreeing to give him part of her salary. Richard is hesitant, but later calls Kate to accept the job. Suspecting that Sean is lying about being Solomon's father, Frankie decides to meet with Sean at the restaurant Juniper works at; Juniper cuts Sean's ponytail in order to collect his DNA. Bianca lambasts Frankie, who reveals her worries about being replaced in Solomon's life. After being mocked by her classmates for "running a train", Alice searches the term on Anne's computer and clicks on a pornographic link; the ensuing pop-up ads causes a virus, deleting Anne's files. While attempting to rewrite the chapters on Alice's laptop, Anne views Alice's social media page and discovers that she is being bullied and slut-shamed by her classmates.
45	6	"Lice"	Joyce Wong	Kathleen Phillips	March 24, 2020
A massive head lice outbreak spreads throughout the children at Val's camp. Anne forces Lionel to quarantine in the basement when he contracts the head lice from Jayme. Kate is selected for Future Magazine's 40 Under 40 list, but panics during the interview when she realizes she has contracted head lice from Charlie, thereby spreading it throughout the office. Kate asks Frankie to come to the office to help with lice treatment; Frankie agrees, in exchange for Kate and Nathan's help in staging a house. Anne discovers Alice's sexual reputation at school and tries to comfort her; Alice reveals that the rumors started after she kissed two classmates during the party at Kate's office. While helping Frankie at her open house, Kate reveals to Nathan that she has cancelled their trip to meet with Tru Air in New York; Nathan angrily confronts her for prioritizing her job over her family.
46	7	"Bad Reputation"	Joyce Wong	Jillian Locke	March 31, 2020
With Kate's help, Anne tries to help Alice defend herself against her bullies, after which Anne decides to change the direction of her parenting book to focus on empowerment. After discovering $10,000 has been withdrawn from Solomon's college fund, Frankie and Bianca visit the address of Sean's house, only to discover that Sean does not actually live there. Jenny is reprimanded by her colleagues when news of her raise spreads throughout the office. Realizing that her raise is hush money, Jenny angrily confronts Malcolm. Aprés receives backlash when a high school basketball player gets into a car accident after drinking six cans; Kate tries to salvage Aprés' image by offering a media tour of the company's facility and operations. Kate is forced to take Charlie to Aprés' factory when he misses the camp drop-off bus. Charlie ends up wandering off and takes an elevator to the building's fifth floor.
47	8	"Charlie and the Weed Factory"	Joyce Wong	Catherine Reitman	April 7, 2020
Kate calls Anne for help before discovering that Charlie has safely returned to the facility lobby. Anne arrives and recounts Alice's party in front of Craig and a reporter, causing the reporter to question the safety of Aprés product. At a local park, Frankie sees Sean doing yard work; she attacks him for being a con artist and calls the police. Jenny threatens to reveal the company's gender pay gap unless Malcolm provides an on-site workplace daycare. Malcolm agrees to Jenny's terms, and later praises her for her confidence; the two end up kissing. Anne's publisher is unhappy with the new direction of her book and drops out of the book deal. Lionel tells Anne that he has received a new job in Calgary. With Alice's bullying worsening at school, Anne and Lionel decide to move their family to Calgary, and Anne reveals the news to Kate.
