= Workin' Moms season 1 =

Season of television series

Workin' Moms
- Season 1
- Starring: Catherine Reitman; Dani Kind; Juno Rinaldi; Jessalyn Wanlim
- No. of episodes: 13

Release
- Original network: CBC
- Original release: January 10 – April 4, 2017

Season chronology
- Next → Season 2

The first season of Workin' Moms, a Canadian comedy television series created by Catherine Reitman, premiered on CBC Television on January 10, 2017. The first season features an ensemble cast that includes Catherine Reitman, Jessalyn Wanlim, Dani Kind and Juno Rinaldi as a group of friends from a mommy-and-me parenting group as they deal with the challenges of being working mothers. The series is produced by Wolf + Rabbit Entertainment, the production company of Reitman and her husband, Philip Sternberg.

== Cast ==
=== Starring ===
- Catherine Reitman as Kate Foster
- Dani Kind as Anne Carlson
- Juno Rinaldi as Frankie Coyne
- Jessalyn Wanlim as Jenny Matthews
- Philip Sternberg as Nathan Foster
- Ryan Belleville as Lionel Carlson
- Sadie Munroe as Alice Carlson
- Dennis Andres as Ian Matthews

=== Recurring ===
- Sarah McVie as Valerie "Val" Szalinsky
- Katherine Barrell as Alicia Rutherford
- Peter Keleghan as Richard Greenwood
- Nikki Duval as Rosie Phillips
- Kevin Vidal as Mo Daniels
- Jann Arden as Jane Carlson
- Oluniké Adeliyi as Giselle Bois
- Jess Salgueiro as Mean Nanny/Renya
- Novie Edwards as Sheila
- Jennifer Pudavick as Gena Morris
- Alden Adair as Marvin Grimes

=== Guest ===
- Mary Ashton as Sarah Hoffman

== Episodes ==
No. overall	No. in season	Title	Directed by	Written by	Original release date
1	1	"Bare"	Catherine Reitman	Catherine Reitman	January 10, 2017
Workin' Moms follows a group of working mothers from a prestigious mommy-and-me parenting group in Toronto: PR executive Kate Foster; Kate's longtime best friend and no-nonsense psychiatrist Anne Carlson; real estate agent Frankie Coyne; and IT specialist Jenny Matthews. Following a nine-month maternity leave, Kate returns to her job at high class PR firm "Gaze" and discovers two people having been hired in her absence. Kate excels on her first day, but is upset to find out through text that she missed an important milestone in her baby's life. Anne discovers she is pregnant despite having recently had a baby, and she reveals the news to her supportive husband Lionel. Frankie organizes her first open house following maternity leave, but struggles with postpartum depression, much to the concern of her wife Giselle.
2	2	"Rules"	Paul Fox	Catherine Reitman	January 17, 2017
Kate is told by her boss Richard that she is eligible for a three-month work gig in Montreal; Kate expresses interest in the promotion, despite the objections of her husband Nathan. Kate and Nathan fire their daytime nanny after discovering that she has been feeding Charlie baby formula without their permission, and Kate is finally successful at getting Charlie to latch. Anne is horrified to discover that her nine-year-old daughter Alice is expressing inappropriate behavior at school. Following her maternity leave, Jenny expresses reluctance about returning to work, but her stay-at-home husband Ian objects, as he wants more time at home to work on his screenplay. On her first day at work, Jenny masturbates in the break room and gets caught by a colleague.
3	3	"Fem Card"	Aleysa Young	Catherine Reitman	January 24, 2017
Alicia invites the mom group to her daughter's gender-neutral birthday party. Kate reluctantly hires her uptight mother, Eleanor, to babysit Charlie throughout the day. Although Eleanor is happy to take care of Charlie, she constantly complains about Olly, Kate and Nathan's aggressive house dog. Jenny flirts with her new boss, Marvin. After Frankie falls asleep with her baby in the bathtub, Giselle forces Frankie to attend therapy to address her postpartum. Frankie schedules a therapy session with Anne, and breaks down while imagining her child. At Alicia's birthday party, Frankie reels from the medication that Anne has prescribed and experiences a brief breakdown in front of the partygoers. Following the incident, Frankie apologizes to the mothers and they all share dinner together.
4	4	"Bad Help"	Paul Fox	Catherine Reitman	January 31, 2017
Anne reveals her pregnancy to the mom group, and hires an expert "mean nanny" to deal with Alice's rebellious behavior. Anne is content with the new nanny's authoritative tone towards Alice, but grows wary when the nanny aims to improve the family's lifestyle. Kate starts to rethink her decision to hire her mother as Charlie's babysitter; Eleanor does not keep the house tidy, does not take Charlie outside, and neglects to feed Olly. Eleanor again voices her disapproval of Olly after she is badly bitten by the dog. Jenny reveals to the mom group that she feels Ian is doing nothing as a stay-at-home dad, while Ian feels that Jenny does not trust him to be around their daughter. After fighting with Ian about staying late at work, Jenny follows Marvin on social media and stalks his profile.
5	5	"Sophie's Choice-ish"	Paul Fox	Diane Flacks	February 7, 2017
Charlie bites another child at the playground. Eleanor suggests Charlie is mimicking Olly and demands that Kate and Nathan euthanize the dog, upsetting Kate. When Nathan agrees that Olly is providing a hostile environment for Charlie, Kate contemplates euthanizing Olly, but ultimately decides to give him to her friendly dog-loving assistant Rosie. Under Anne's advice, Frankie takes up pottery as a new hobby, but she still feels disconnected in her relationship with Giselle. Anne becomes jealous when Alice forms a friendly bond with the new nanny. Anne expresses to Lionel that she does not have a maternal bond with Alice, but he reassures her that she has a great connection with their daughter.
6	6	"The Wolf & the Rabbit"	Aleysa Young	Rebecca Kohler	February 14, 2017
While discussing porn preferences with the mom group, Kate is mocked after revealing she likes to watch Hentai; Kate later complains to her colleagues, but is reprimanded in a work meeting. Richard informs Kate that her competitive male colleague Mo is competing with her for the Montreal promotion. Jenny wants to strike an affair with Marvin, and her colleague Gena sends an inappropriate text message to Marvin from Jenny's social media account. After Marvin receives the message, he initiates a brief sexual encounter with Jenny that she quickly breaks off. Struggling to connect with Giselle, Frankie visits an adult toy store and gets advice from a professional sex advisor. Later that night, Frankie confronts Giselle about the disconnect in their relationship, emphasizing her need for communication.
7	7	"Phoenix Rising"	Aleysa Young	Ingrid Haas	February 21, 2017
Frankie succeeds as a real estate agent and is praised by her boss. She tries to call Giselle to celebrate the news, but is abruptly shut down. While Lionel is away, Anne tries to bond with Alice, but struggles to connect with her daughter's interests. Jenny reluctantly helps Ian create a Kickstarter campaign about stay-at-home dads to help promote his new screenplay. While filming an interview, Jenny reveals that she feels disconnected from her child, while Ian gets to stay home and bond with their daughter. At Gaze, Kate hands the reins to a junior staffer for a pitch presentation, during which Mo makes hurtful comments towards another colleague; Kate later tries to comfort the colleague, who inadvertently reveals that Mo has been offered the Montreal promotion. At home, Kate has an intimate conversation with her father, who advises her to be truthful with Nathan.
8	8	"Popsicle and a Hoop Earring"	Aleysa Young	Karen Moore	February 28, 2017
After being asked by Kate to hire a replacement nanny for Charlie, Eleanor ends up hiring Kate's free-spirited sister Sarah, who is a voice actor for a famous children's cartoon show. Kate is surprised when Richard personally offers her the Montreal gig; she happily accepts the offer, but neglects to inform Nathan. Frankie and Giselle meet with Anne to discuss the disconnect in their relationship, and the two decide to revive their sex life. Jenny hosts an impromptu bachelorette party for a co-worker, to Ian's dismay, and invites the mom group. Frankie and Giselle attend the party and have a good time, while Anne and Kate vent their frustrations to party guests. In the bathroom, Jenny drunkenly gets Frankie to pierce her nipple with a lost hoop earring, and comes to the realization that she wants to divorce Ian.
9	9	"Tricky Nipple"	Paul Fox	Rebecca Kohler	March 7, 2017
Kate tells Nathan that she has already accepted the Montreal promotion; Nathan is angry at Kate's dishonesty, and expresses concern about Charlie being away from his mother for three months. Sarah supports her sister's decision and offers to help babysit Charlie in Kate's absence. Following her improvised nipple piercing, Jenny's nipple gets infected; Jenny later confides to Val, the kooky leader of the mom group, about stopping breastfeeding. Frankie begins showing signs of depression. Lionel and Anne face financial troubles, forcing Anne to take up extra clients. During a therapy session, Anne faints on her stomach due to a subchorionic bleed; she is advised by her doctor to stay on bed rest, as the bleeding could increase the risk of a miscarriage.
10	10	"The Coxswain"	Paul Fox	Karen Moore	March 14, 2017
As Alice's relationship with the nanny continues to flourish, Anne makes another attempt to bond with Alice by taking her for horseback riding. Against Lionel and the doctor's orders, Anne rides a horse and suddenly begins spotting; she is rushed back to the hospital and placed on mandatory bed rest from home. Frankie continues to struggle with her postpartum, and a breakdown in front of a client forces her to take time off work. Kate takes time off work to plan for Montreal; she spends the day with a group of Sarah's friends, and later tries to bribe Val in order to ensure that Charlie keeps his spot in the mommy-and-me group. Although Nathan is still not thrilled about the Montreal promotion, he accepts Kate's decision and the two make up.
11	11	"Bye Bye Kate"	Paul Fox	Rebecca Kohler	March 21, 2017
Giselle returns to her teaching job, leaving the temporarily unemployed Frankie to stay at home with Rhoda. Encouraged by a Marie Kondo book, Frankie attempts to achieve "domestic purity" by selling items online. Anne reveals to the mom group that she's considering an abortion, shocking the mothers. Skipping her bed rest, Anne asks Kate to drive her to an abortion clinic; however, Anne feels uncomfortable being present in the clinic without Lionel and quickly leaves. Lionel lambasts Anne for not consulting him. Jenny goes out for wild partying with Gena, and ends up getting intimate with another patron. After being reprimanded by Gena, Jenny returns home and tearfully reveals her nipple ring to a shocked Ian, who helps her remove the piercing.
12	12	"Merde"	Paul Fox	Catherine Reitman	March 28, 2017
Kate enjoys her first few days in Montreal, though she struggles to adjust to life without Nathan and Charlie. Kate later gives her first work presentation for Victoria Stromanger, the intimidating female client whom Kate idolizes. Ian, feeling betrayed by Jenny's actions, begins acting coldly towards her. A manic Frankie quickly becomes addicted to making sales online, and she winds up selling the family home. Giselle states that she feels she's "drowning" in their marriage, and threatens to leave if Frankie does not get their house back. Anne and Lionel reconcile and have an honest discussion about raising a third child. After creating a pros and cons list, Anne and Lionel ultimately agree to go through with the abortion.
13	13	"Having It All"	Paul Fox	Catherine Reitman	April 4, 2017
During her first sales meeting, Kate discovers that Charlie has been taken to the hospital. Shocked, Kate inadvertently tells the clients about Charlie's state; Victoria chastises Kate for "revealing negative truths" in front of the clients. Against Victoria's order to finish the meeting, Kate leaves and takes an immediate flight to Toronto to visit Charlie in the hospital. Alice asks Anne to participate in her school project, which ultimately brings the two closer together. Ian confronts Jenny for being dishonest, and asks if she is committed to their relationship; Jenny states that she does not know, causing Ian to break up with her. Frankie is able to reclaim her house from the new buyers, and she shares an intimate moment with Giselle, revealing that she wants to attend a therapy program to deal with her depression.

== Reception ==
On Rotten Tomatoes, season 1 has an approval rating of 77% based on reviews from 13 critics.
