= Workin' Moms season 3 =

Season of television series

Workin' Moms
- Season 3
- Starring: Catherine Reitman; Dani Kind; Juno Rinaldi; Jessalyn Wanlim; Sarah McVie
- No. of episodes: 13

Release
- Original network: CBC
- Original release: January 10 – March 21, 2019

Season chronology
- ← Previous; Season 2 Next → Season 4

The third season of Workin' Moms, the Canadian comedy television series, aired in 2019.

Workin' Moms is a Canadian television sitcom whose third season premiered on CBC Television on January 10, 2019. The show stars Catherine Reitman, Jessalyn Wanlim, Dani Kind, and Juno Rinaldi as a group of friends dealing with the challenges of being working mothers. The series is produced by Wolf + Rabbit Entertainment, the production company of Reitman and her husband, Philip Sternberg.

== Cast ==
=== Starring ===
- Catherine Reitman as Kate Foster
- Dani Kind as Anne Carlson
- Juno Rinaldi as Frankie Coyne
- Jessalyn Wanlim as Jenny Matthews
- Sarah McVie as Valerie "Val" Szalinsky
- Philip Sternberg as Nathan Foster
- Ryan Belleville as Lionel Carlson
- Sadie Munroe as Alice Carlson
- Dennis Andres as Ian Matthews
- Donald MacLean as Forrest Greenwood

=== Recurring ===
- Peter Keleghan as Richard Greenwood
- Nikki Duval as Rosie Phillips
- Kevin Vidal as Mo Daniels
- Victor Webster as Mike Bolinksi
- Oluniké Adeliyi as Giselle Bois
- Novie Edwards as Sheila

=== Guest ===
- Jess Salgueiro as Mean Nanny/Renya
- Jennifer Pudavick as Gena Morris

== Episodes ==
No. overall	No. in season	Title	Directed by	Written by	Original release date
27	1	"Birth Daze"	Catherine Reitman	Catherine Reitman	January 10, 2019
In a series of flashbacks, Kate confronts Nathan over his affair with Anne's nanny (whose name is revealed to be Renya) and moves out. Eight months later, a heavily pregnant Kate moves out of Anne's house and buys a brand-new apartment. At Kate Foster Public Relations, Kate hires Richard's naivé 21-year-old son Forrest as her assistant. Kate goes into labor while having lunch with her mother, and Nathan assists her with the delivery. She gives birth to a baby girl, but refuses to let Nathan hold her. Two months after giving birth, Kate refuses to let Nathan have a relationship with their baby daughter Ella. During a presentation with life insurance company Stenton Capital, Kate introduces a marketing campaign intended to appeal to single mothers, but they reject her idea. That night, Kate calls Forrest, and the two have sex.
28	2	"Of Rights And Men"	Philip Sternberg	Jillian Locke	January 10, 2019
Anne testifies against Brad in court, but she is unable to take the case to trial. Angered, Anne vandalizes Brad's car outside of the courthouse. Frankie excels with her new real estate company, and she helps Bianca find a new house. Frankie later receives a visit from Juniper, who has been cut off financially by her mother after coming out, and asks if Frankie can help pay for her tuition. Kate hesitantly meets with Stenton Capital and a group of wealthy misogynistic businessmen; she is dismayed when they hail her as a "woman for men's rights". In desperate need of money for her fledgling business, Kate bends her morals and decides to sign the businessmen on as clients. Kate and Nathan attend a meeting with Charlie's teacher, who recommends hiring a behavioral specialist for Charlie. Kate introduces Nathan to Ella, stating that he deserves to be her father.
29	3	"Daddy's Home"	Philip Sternberg	Kathleen Phillips	January 17, 2019
Rosie reprimands Kate for signing on the misogynistic clients and threatens to quit. After bonding with the mothers at her workplace, Jenny visits Ian and expresses a desire to reconnect with Zoe; Ian reluctantly allows her to take Zoe to a lemon-tasting party with her colleagues. At the party, Jenny tells the other mothers that Ian is controlling and abusive. Frankie agrees to loan money to Juniper for her school tuition. Anne speaks with the dean at the university Brad used to teach at and persuades him into offering her a job as an on-campus psychiatrist. Alice expresses interest in taking the subway to school, but Anne dismisses the idea. Kate continues her sexual fling with Forrest and shows up at his house; Richard unexpectedly arrives and discovers Kate standing naked on the porch. Kate and Richard are stunned when Forrest proclaims that he loves her.
30	4	"Training Day"	Philip Sternberg	Monica Heisey	January 24, 2019
Kate ends her sexual fling with Forrest after discovering that he wants to begin a relationship. Bianca reveals to Frankie that she is trying to have a baby through intrauterine insemination. While shopping for nursery items, Bianca grows overwhelmed and leaves; Frankie later visits Bianca and tries to assuage her doubts. Kate discovers that her new clients have hired Renya as a nanny, and falsely tells them that Renya is a thief. After discovering that the clients have fired Renya, Kate meets with Renya and confronts her for pursuing an affair with Nathan. Anne teaches Alice self-defense tactics to protect herself against predators on the subway. When a pizza delivery man arrives at the Carlson home, Alice mistakes him for a predator and kicks him in the crotch; Anne is pleased and allows Alice to take the subway alone.
31	5	"Stand for Something"	Philip Sternberg	Rob Baker, Adam Cawley	January 31, 2019
Jenny hosts a birthday party for Zoe and invites her colleagues; Ian arrives and is enraged to discover that Jenny had told her colleagues that he is abusive. While taking the subway home, Alice misses her stop and gets lost walking the streets; she is offered a ride home by a passerby. When Alice arrives home, Anne believes the driver is a predator and attacks him, only to discover that he is the father of Alice's friend Brenna. After Kate gets into an argument with a journalist mother from Charlie's school, the mother ends up publishing an article exposing Kate Foster Public Relations' association with Stenton Capital. As a result of the article, Kate's new clients decide to end their partnership with Kate's firm. Faced with the prospect of losing potential clients, Kate interrupts a dinner with Stenton Capital and ends up bonding with PR executive Mike Bolinski.
32	6	"Narls In Charge"	Philip Sternberg	Daniel Gold, Catherine Reitman	February 7, 2019
Charlie is suspended from school for aggressive and hyperactive behavior, and Kate is forced to have Narla, an early childhood development specialist, observe Charlie's behavior from home. Kate tries to offer her PR services for a women's clinic, only to discover that the clinic is closing down because a developer has bought the land; Mike encourages her to speak out publicly against the closure. Kate returns home and has sex with Nathan. Lionel tries to help Anne confront her trauma by taking her to a rage room. Anne later apologizes to Brenna's father who, in the process, confronts her about Alice's bad behavior. Bianca discovers that she is unable to get pregnant because of her poor egg quality, and laments her financial situation to Frankie. To make it up to Bianca, Frankie contacts Juniper, who has dropped out of school, and suggests that Juniper donate one of her frozen eggs to Bianca.
33	7	"Revenge Fantasy"	Yael Staav	Jillian Locke	February 14, 2019
With Mike's assistance, Kate organizes a group of women to publicly protest the developers' plans to close the women's clinic. After failing to get Rhoda registered for a city-run daycare, Frankie tries to get Rhoda enrolled in Val's spring break children's camp. Frankie also meets Val's unruly teenage sons, Jacob and Joseph, who have been acting out since their father left. Alice and Brenna retaliate against their uptight teacher by baking cookies tainted with laxatives. The plan goes wrong when the teacher offers their cookies to the other students; Anne, Lionel, and Brenna's parents are forced to meet with the principal to discuss the incident. Jenny gets promoted to a manager position at work and is asked to supervise her colleagues; Gena returns to work after maternity leave and breaks down, but Jenny coldly tells her to step up. Nathan arrives at Kate's apartment to visit her, but unexpectedly runs into Mike.
34	8	"Girl's Trip"	Yael Staav	Monica Heisey	February 21, 2019
Kate, Anne, Frankie and Val spend the weekend at a cabin to celebrate Frankie's birthday. Val uncovers a box of items that she has confiscated from her sons, and the four women decide to take LSD. Kate, Anne, Frankie and Val make unexpected revelations as they deal with the drug's psychedelic side effects: Anne reveals to Kate that she hired Renya to take care of the children for the weekend, resulting in a fight; Kate tells Anne that she had sex with Nathan, and she experiences a visual hallucination, imagining that a deer is her late father; Frankie tells Val about her romantic feelings for Bianca, who has successfully gotten pregnant. The four women wander outside and are detained by the police. After being released, Kate and Anne reconcile; Kate admits that she confronted Renya about the affair, but ultimately felt sorry for her.
35	9	"Guns 'n' Deception"	Yael Staav	Kathleen Phillips	February 28, 2019
Marvin asks Jenny to manage the office while he is away. Ian injures his leg in a car accident and is forced to take time off work; Jenny offers him a job at her firm. Val develops a crush on Kate's landlord Mel. Frankie confesses her romantic feelings to Bianca, who reciprocates with a kiss. After having sex, Bianca shows Frankie her newly-decorated nursery, which is filled with religious imagery. Inspired by her clinic protest, Kate fires Stenton Capital as a client and pursues a relationship with Mike. However, Kate then discovers that Forrest has filed a sexual harassment lawsuit against her. During a therapy session, Anne discovers that her client Georgia has stolen her violent boyfriend's gun. When Georgia's boyfriend confronts Anne in her office, Anne pulls the gun on him and orders him to leave the property. Instead of giving the gun to the police, Anne decides to hide the gun in an air conditioning vent at home.
36	10	"Creamed"	Renuka Jeyapalan	Daniel Gold, Catherine Reitman	March 7, 2019
Nathan agrees to help defend Kate in her sexual harassment lawsuit filed by Forrest. During the settlement conference, Forrest's lawyer claims that Kate emotionally manipulated and exploited him for her benefit. Nathan counters that Forrest filed the lawsuit because Kate did not reciprocate his feelings. Richard arrives at the conference and threatens Forrest into dropping the lawsuit. Anne and Lionel confront Alice after discovering a vape pen in her room; Alice tells them that the vape is actually Brenna's. Lionel schedules a dinner with Brenna's parents in order to discuss their daughters' respective behavior. Frankie questions Bianca about her faith, and Bianca reveals that she started praying again while trying to get pregnant. Later, Frankie and Bianca have dinner with Giselle and Juniper, but Giselle is uncomfortable with Bianca's faith and strongly voices her disapproval.
37	11	"Business Boyz"	Renuka Jeyapalan	Rob Baker, Adam Cawley	March 14, 2019
Kate and Nathan are forced to confront the future of their relationship in couples therapy. Ian starts a new job as a handyman at Jenny's firm and bonds with her colleagues, to Jenny's dismay. Val hires Mel to do work around the house, during which Mel confronts Jacob and Joseph for disrespecting Val. Anne and Lionel host a family dinner with Brenna's parents; Anne accuses Brenna of manipulating Alice, while Brenna's parents demand that Anne take Alice to a psychiatrist. Alice and Brenna discover Anne's gun and fire it, abruptly ending the dinner. Airline company Tru Air considers hiring Kate Foster Public Relations to initiate a Canadian marketing campaign. Kate is asked to travel to New York to make a pitch for the Tru Air CEO, and Nathan changes the date of his court case to watch the kids while Kate is away. While boarding the airplane, Kate reunites with Mike.
38	12	"Two Paths"	Renuka Jeyapalan	Catherine Reitman	March 21, 2019
In New York, Kate competes against Mike for the Tru Air campaign pitch; the two end up joining forces and share a pitch together. After giving their pitch to the CEO, Kate and Mike have sex. Anne discovers that Alice is missing, and that the gun is gone. While searching for Alice, Anne confesses that she kept the gun because "something awoke" inside of her when she held it. Giselle is unhappy when Frankie asks Bianca to babysit Rhoda, forcing Frankie to act as mediator between the two women. Bianca tells Giselle that she cannot change her faith, but promises to keep her beliefs to herself in front of Rhoda. Anne and Lionel ultimately discover that Alice had turned the weapon in to the police, claiming that she had found it outside. Although she is proud of Alice for making the right decision, Anne laments to Lionel about being a bad mother, as she had jeopardized her daughter's safety.
39	13	"What's It Gonna Be?"	Catherine Reitman	Catherine Reitman	March 21, 2019
Kate leaves New York to attend a Halloween costume contest at Charlie's school. She receives a call from Nathan and discovers that Ella has learned to sit upwards. Nathan also apologizes for his infidelity and breaking up the family; she forgives him, admitting that she isn't perfect either. While preparing Zoe for the Halloween contest, Jenny confides to Ian over how she has no friends; Ian encourages her to work on being nicer and more approachable. Frankie encourages Val to ask out Mel. Anne runs into Brenna, who hesitantly decides to show her Alice's finsta account; Anne briefly scrolls through the account, which consists of posts showing Alice engaging in harmful and illegal behavior. Kate receives a call from Mike, who reveals that Tru Air had chosen their pitch for the Canadian campaign. He also asks Kate to accompany him for a vacation in Cabo, leaving Kate to choose between Mike and Nathan.
