= List of Workin' Moms episodes =

Workin' Moms is a Canadian television sitcom that premiered on CBC Television on January 10, 2017. The show stars Catherine Reitman, Jessalyn Wanlim, Dani Kind, Enuka Okuma, and Juno Rinaldi as a group of friends dealing with the challenges of being working mothers. The series is produced by Wolf + Rabbit Entertainment, the production company of Reitman and her husband, Philip Sternberg.

In February 2019, in the middle of season 3, the series premiered globally on Netflix. On May 29, 2019, Workin' Moms was renewed for a fourth season, which premiered on February 18, 2020. In April 2020, the series was renewed for a fifth season, which premiered on February 16, 2021. In June 2021, the series was renewed for a sixth season, which premiered on January 4, 2022. On June 20, 2022, creator Catherine Reitman announced that pre-production had begun on a seventh and final season, which premiered on January 3, 2023.

== Episodes ==
Season	Episodes	Originally released	
Season	Episodes	First released	Last released
1	13	January 10, 2017	April 4, 2017
2	13	December 19, 2017	April 10, 2018
3	13	January 10, 2019	March 21, 2019
4	8	February 18, 2020	April 7, 2020
5	10	February 16, 2021	April 13, 2021
6	13	January 4, 2022	April 12, 2022
7	13	January 3, 2023	March 28, 2023

=== Season 1 (2017) ===
No. overall	No. in season	Title	Directed by	Written by	Original release date
1	1	"Bare"	Catherine Reitman	Catherine Reitman	January 10, 2017
2	2	"Rules"	Paul Fox	Catherine Reitman	January 17, 2017
3	3	"Fem Card"	Aleysa Young	Catherine Reitman	January 24, 2017
4	4	"Bad Help"	Paul Fox	Catherine Reitman	January 31, 2017
5	5	"Sophie's Choice-ish"	Paul Fox	Diane Flacks	February 7, 2017
6	6	"The Wolf & the Rabbit"	Aleysa Young	Rebecca Kohler	February 14, 2017
7	7	"Phoenix Rising"	Aleysa Young	Ingrid Haas	February 21, 2017
8	8	"Popsicle and a Hoop Earring"	Aleysa Young	Karen Moore	February 28, 2017
9	9	"Tricky Nipple"	Paul Fox	Rebecca Kohler	March 7, 2017
10	10	"The Coxswain"	Paul Fox	Karen Moore	March 14, 2017
11	11	"Bye Bye Kate"	Paul Fox	Rebecca Kohler	March 21, 2017
12	12	"Merde"	Paul Fox	Catherine Reitman	March 28, 2017
13	13	"Having It All"	Paul Fox	Catherine Reitman	April 4, 2017

=== Season 2 (2017–18) ===
No. overall	No. in season	Title	Directed by	Written by	Original release date
14	1	"2005"	Catherine Reitman	Catherine Reitman	December 19, 2017
15	2	"Good Mom"	Paul Fox	Catherine Reitman	January 9, 2018
16	3	"The Sign"	Paul Fox	Catherine Reitman	January 16, 2018
17	4	"The Holy Hole"	Paul Fox	Hannah Cheesman & Catherine Reitman	January 23, 2018
18	5	"Consent"	Molly McGlynn	Robby Hoffman & Rebecca Kohler	January 30, 2018
19	6	"Shame Spiral"	Philip Sternberg	Jillian Locke	February 6, 2018
20	7	"Retreat"	Paul Fox	Karen Moore & Kathleen Phillips	February 27, 2018
21	8	"Red Handed"	Catherine Reitman	Rebecca Kohler	March 6, 2018
22	9	"Spirit Animal"	Aleysa Young	Karen Moore	March 13, 2018
23	10	"Cuck"	Aleysa Young	Rebecca Kohler	March 20, 2018
24	11	"Trash Panda"	Aleysa Young	Karen Moore	March 27, 2018
25	12	"If Women Had to Give Birth"	Aleysa Young	Catherine Reitman	April 3, 2018
26	13	"Look Back"	Catherine Reitman	Catherine Reitman	April 10, 2018

=== Season 3 (2019) ===
No. overall	No. in season	Title	Directed by	Written by	Original release date
27	1	"Birth Daze"	Catherine Reitman	Catherine Reitman	January 10, 2019
28	2	"Of Rights And Men"	Philip Sternberg	Jillian Locke	January 10, 2019
29	3	"Daddy's Home"	Philip Sternberg	Kathleen Phillips	January 17, 2019
30	4	"Training Day"	Philip Sternberg	Monica Heisey	January 24, 2019
31	5	"Stand for Something"	Philip Sternberg	Rob Baker, Adam Cawley	January 31, 2019
32	6	"Narls In Charge"	Philip Sternberg	Daniel Gold, Catherine Reitman	February 7, 2019
33	7	"Revenge Fantasy"	Yael Staav	Jillian Locke	February 14, 2019
34	8	"Girl's Trip"	Yael Staav	Monica Heisey	February 21, 2019
35	9	"Guns 'n' Deception"	Yael Staav	Kathleen Phillips	February 28, 2019
36	10	"Creamed"	Renuka Jeyapalan	Daniel Gold, Catherine Reitman	March 7, 2019
37	11	"Business Boyz"	Renuka Jeyapalan	Rob Baker, Adam Cawley	March 14, 2019
38	12	"Two Paths"	Renuka Jeyapalan	Catherine Reitman	March 21, 2019
39	13	"What's It Gonna Be?"	Catherine Reitman	Catherine Reitman	March 21, 2019

=== Season 4 (2020) ===
No. overall	No. in season	Title	Directed by	Written by	Original release date
40	1	"Charade"	Catherine Reitman	Catherine Reitman	February 18, 2020
41	2	"Black Sheep"	Philip Sternberg	Jillian Locke	February 25, 2020
42	3	"The Man in the Mexican Mask"	Philip Sternberg	Kathleen Phillips	March 3, 2020
43	4	"No One's Coming"	Philip Sternberg	Daniel Gold	March 10, 2020
44	5	"To Lure a Squirrel"	Joyce Wong	Daniel Gold	March 17, 2020
45	6	"Lice"	Joyce Wong	Kathleen Phillips	March 24, 2020
46	7	"Bad Reputation"	Joyce Wong	Jillian Locke	March 31, 2020
47	8	"Charlie and the Weed Factory"	Joyce Wong	Catherine Reitman	April 7, 2020

=== Season 5 (2021) ===
No. overall	No. in season	Title	Directed by	Written by	Original release date
48	1	"The Carlsons Move to Calgary"	Mars Horodyski	Catherine Reitman	February 16, 2021
The Carlsons move to their new home in Cochrane, Alberta. Although Anne is reluctant, they are forced to stay because of the COVID-19 lockdowns. Five months later, Alice begins classes at her new school and befriends Bennett, who invites her to join the Cochrane Conservative Committee. After being encouraged by Lionel to make friends, Anne hesitantly goes out for drinks with Bennett's mother Cheryl and her friend Tomé. One month later, Kate, Frankie and Val visit Anne in Cochrane but are put off by her new friends, resulting in Val attacking Tomé. Kate advises Anne to find a new purpose in Cochrane. Anne begins taking anti-anxiety medication and considers taking up a psychiatrist job at Lionel's office.
49	2	"Mama Mia Meatboy"	Mars Horodyski	Daniel Gold	February 23, 2021
After losing a potential client to Mo, Kate feels pressure to land a major new client: the ambitious and ruthless Sloane Mitchell, a publishing executive for Wynston Publishing. During a meeting, Kate proposes multiple in-app purchases for one of Sloane's children's publications, impressing Sloane. The two women have dinner at an exclusive restaurant; Sloane expresses a disinterest in settling down and raising a family. Nathan tells Kate that his ex-girlfriend Marlene is in the hospital, inspiring him to begin a new exercise regime. While Bianca is out of town, Frankie decides to give a pet rat to Rhoda, to Giselle's dismay. Frankie is offered an exclusive agency agreement for a local apartment building. Anne continues to abuse her anti-anxiety medication as Lionel manages to schedule her interview at his office. Although Anne is intoxicated during the interview, she ultimately lands the job.
50	3	"Pleasure Yourself"	Aleysa Young	Karen Moore	March 2, 2021
Sloane decides to hire Kate and they attend a meeting with the app developers, during which Sloane decides to buy out their company. Kate convinces Sloane to set up a virtual meeting with Anne to discuss her parenting book, but Anne is reluctant. Alice begins to instill conservative values as she continues to bond with Bennett, and he convinces her to push back against their science teacher for teaching "propaganda". Jenny is pursuing a secret sexual relationship with Malcolm, but discovers that he believes they are non-exclusive. Jenny later follows Malcolm and sees him flirting with another man. Anne begins her new job as a corporate counsellor, but dismisses Cheryl and Tomé, who want a prescription for more pills without booking a session. After flushing her own medications down the toilet, Anne takes a flight to Toronto, telling Kate that she wants to meet with Sloane.
51	4	"A Rat, Girl"	Aleysa Young	Daniel Gold	March 9, 2021
Lionel lambasts Anne for returning to Toronto after her first day of work. While attending the storybook exhibit at Rhoda's school, Frankie and Giselle are impressed by Rhoda's artistic abilities after viewing her "Rat Girl" story. Kate and Sloane attend a children's event to meet an author signed to Wynston Publishing, only to discover that the author has not met her second book deadline. When the author abruptly leaves, Kate pitches Rhoda's "Rat Girl" story to the audience. Val abruptly decides to kick Jacob and Joseph out of her house. Frankie interviews potential hires for her real estate agency. Jenny struggles to accept Malcolm's bisexuality. After he accuses her of being close-minded, Jenny later interrupts Malcolm's date to reconcile. Sloane reads Anne's publishing book and offers her a publishing deal, but insists that Anne run a book press tour to stir up public interest.
52	5	"Mother Knows Breast"	Mars Horodyski	Jessie Gabe	March 16, 2021
Val discovers that her sons have set up camp in the front yard, leading her to seek advice from Anne, who meets with Jacob and Joseph and tries to connect with them by relating their father's departure. Frankie tries to give tips to her new hires in order to secure more clients; Brody, one of the hires, falls to his death after trying to prove the strength of the buildings' windows. Bennett and Alice vandalize their science teachers' classroom to protest the "global warming propaganda". After the two are suspended, Bennett breaks up with Alice, calling her complicated. Kate convinces Anne to do an interview on Alicia's parenting podcast, only for the interview to turn heated when they criticize each others' parenting styles. With the help of Sloane, Kate secures Anne an appearance on a live television show, but the women are stunned to discover that Alicia is appearing in the same segment as a guest.
53	6	"Finger in the Butt"	Mars Horodyski	Linsey Stewart	March 23, 2021
Anne slaps Alicia after she reveals her abortion in front of the audience. Anne rebukes Kate and Sloane and announces her intentions to self-publish, but Sloane reminds her of the agreements in her Wynston Publishing contract. Bennett begins to act hostile towards Alice, leading Lionel to punch him. Jenny realizes that she wants to be in a non-exclusive relationship with Malcolm; when he is uninterested, Jenny claims that she is pregnant. Nathan gets hit by a car while biking and experiences a testicular tear. Frankie, grappling over Brody's death, decides to visit Kate for financial advice. She instead discovers that Kate and Sloane are publishing "Rat Girl", and condemns Kate for stealing the idea from Rhoda. Kate confronts Sloane, asking her to drop "Rat Girl" and release Anne from her contract; Sloane instead advises Kate to choose between her friends and her job.
54	7	"Launch Pad to Trash Hole"	Mars Horodyski	Karen Moore	March 30, 2021
Kate visits Anne, who is living with Val, and convinces her to continue with her book press tour, revealing that the book's pre-sales have increased due to the interview with Alicia. Following Brody's death, Frankie is forced to fire her staff after the apartment building is shut down, and she considers consulting with Brody's family to avoid getting sued by the landlord. Mel helps Jacob and Joseph acquire jobs and a new apartment, pleasing Val. Lionel, Alice and Jayme return to Toronto and reunite with an emotional Anne. After being advised by Sloane to expand her workforce and take on more Wynston properties, Kate takes out a loan and meets with Mo, offering to buy out his company. Mo agrees, and Kate celebrates by sending an explicit nude to Nathan. That night, Kate is horrified to discover that she has accidentally sent the nude to a group chat with all the mothers from Charlie's school.
55	8	"Punch Dad"	Aleysa Young	Linsey Stewart	April 6, 2021
A video of Lionel punching Bennett begins to circulate online, and Anne is forced to discuss the incident in multiple interviews. Anne confronts Cheryl for posting the video on social media, and Cheryl vows to exact revenge against the Carlson family, blaming Alice for Bennett's suspension. Anne and Lionel agree to move back to Toronto. Nathan informs Kate that Marlene has died of a heart attack. Frankie meets with Brody's father to apologize for playing a role in his death. In the process, Brody's father gives Frankie parenting advice, helping Frankie to strengthen her bond with Solomon. Giselle acquires Rhoda for an interview at a prestigious art school, and Rhoda is accepted after the dean views Rhoda's "Rat Girl" story. Kate receives a call from a drunk Sloane, asking her to pick her up. Kate arrives at the address and is shocked when Sloane persuades a little girl into the back seat.
56	9	"Blue Angel"	Aleysa Young	Jessie Gabe	April 13, 2021
Kate forces Sloane to return the child to her mother, who is revealed to be Sloane's sister Ceecee. While driving away, Sloane reveals to Kate that she was a surrogate mother for Ceecee, who refused to let Sloane have a relationship with her biological daughter. Frankie quits her job and reconciles with Kate. Giselle and Frankie discover that Rhoda had stolen the "Rat Girl" story from the newspaper comic "Rat Rhonda"; they decide to hide this revelation from Rhoda's new art school. Malcolm begins to suspect that Jenny is lying about being pregnant. Anne enrolls Alice in a private all-girls school to protect her family's public image. Sloane wants to promote Anne's parenting book with an old social media picture of Alice holding a gun. Kate and Anne strongly object to the new book cover, but Nathan advises Kate to side with Sloane because of their financial situation.
57	10	"FACK"	Aleysa Young	Daniel Gold	April 13, 2021
Sloane discovers the "Rat Rhonda" newspaper comic and is forced to cancel the "Rat Girl" publishing deal. Anne receives a call from her old boss in Cochrane, who has received a tip from Cheryl that she was abusing prescription drugs at work. Faced with losing her medical license, Anne asks Lionel to reconcile with Cheryl. Lionel visits Cheryl but punches Bennett after being insulted, resulting in Lionel being arrested. During a pitch presentation for Anne's book, Kate proposes a new book cover of Alice and Anne and announces that 5,000 copies have been produced. Sloane lambasts Kate for going behind her back, but Kate is undeterred. Malcolm tries to prove Jenny is not pregnant by forcing her to attend a women's clinic, but they are both shocked to discover that she actually is pregnant. At the end of the episode, Kate receives a visit from Marlene's teenage son, who reveals that Nathan is his biological father.

=== Season 6 (2022) ===
No. overall	No. in season	Title	Directed by	Written by	Original release date
58	1	"Kate Fosters"	Yael Staav	Jessie Gabe	January 4, 2022
Kate and Nathan allow Marlene's son, Nathan Jr., to stay at their house per his mother's wishes. Sloane punishes Kate by forcing her to complete her tasks throughout the day, causing Kate to show up late to a meeting with Goldie's Goodness, a cleaning product company. Goldie is unimpressed and leaves, but Rosie convinces them to return for a second meeting, during which Goldie agrees to hire Kate's firm. Kate discovers that Nathan Jr. has taped up pictures of Marlene around the house and vents to Anne, who believes that Nathan Jr. is acting out of grief. After Kate accidentally kills Nathan Jr.'s pet frog, Nathan Jr. gives Kate his mother's old locket and asks her to wear it. Kate is disturbed and believes that Nathan Jr. is trying to push her and Nathan apart, but Nathan believes that his son is trying to keep Marlene's memory alive.
59	2	"Warm Lunch"	Yael Staav	Daniel Gold	January 11, 2022
Following Cheryl's anonymous tip, Anne is forced to meet with the medical board and is assigned a caseworker, Tina, which disrupts her regular sessions. Alice discovers that she can get the credit for her careers' course if she has a part-time job, and asks Anne for a secretary job in her office. Anne is impressed when Alice gives Kate advice about Nathan Jr., but dismisses Alice's wish to become a psychiatrist. Kate discovers a receipt for a locket in Nathan Jr.'s room and confronts him; Nathan Jr. admits to buying the locket, and confesses feeling uncomfortable with having a new stepmother. Kate approaches Sloane with a book proposal exposing multi-level marketing companies; Sloane is impressed and signs a contract with the author, Rebecca Anderson. Kate reads Rebecca's exposé and discovers Goldie's Goodness among the list of companies.
60	3	"Bye Bye Goldie"	Yael Staav	Linsey Stewart	January 18, 2022
Jenny and Malcolm are called into a meeting with HR to discuss their workplace relationship due to the power imbalance. Malcolm tries to convince Jenny to quit her job, but she refuses, instead telling HR that they are engaged so they can both keep their jobs. Sloane reveals her plan to have a baby through artificial insemination and tells Ceecee, who expresses doubts that Sloane is capable of being a mother. After allowing Sloane to babysit Olivia for the day, Ceecee lambasts Sloane for driving Olivia without a car seat. Lionel discovers that an anti-male judge may be overseeing his court case. Tomé offers to tell Lionel the name of the judge in exchange for sexual favors, but he refuses. Kate drops Goldie's Goodness as a client, but discovers that Rosie has gotten roped into selling Goldie's products. Goldie later visits Kate at her house and vows to find out what Kate is hiding.
61	4	"The Big One"	Yael Staav	Aidan O'Loughlin	January 25, 2022
At Val's behest, Kate and Anne reluctantly plan a birthday party for Val at an exclusive spa. Anne is dismayed to learn that Kate has invited Sloane, and the group ends up getting kicked out of the spa when Sloane and Anne get into an argument at the pool. While having lunch, Val laments that her life is not exciting anymore, leading the four women to get drunk and play truth or dare. After Sloane kisses a random stranger at a local park and vomits, Kate dares Sloane to take a pregnancy test. While waiting for the results, Anne assures Sloane that she will be a good mother, and Sloane is delighted to see that the pregnancy test is positive.
62	5	"Jazz Addict"	Mars Horodyski	Karen Moore	February 1, 2022
After discovering that she is pregnant, Sloane seeks parenting advice from Kate and asks to spend time with Ella for practice. After getting into an argument with Tina, Anne is ordered to attend anger management classes. Kate discovers that Nathan Jr. has a crush and encourages him to "loosen up"; she later discovers that Nathan Jr. is gay when his crush turns out to be male. Jenny convinces Malcolm to throw a lavish wedding in order to deflect suspicions from HR, and asks Gena to be her maid of honor. Goldie finds out about Rebecca's exposé, and she attempts to injure Rebecca by swerving her off the road. Rebecca threatens to end her contract with Wynston Publishing, but Kate and Sloane convince her otherwise. After finding a random phone number in Nathan's laundry, Kate calls the number and discovers it belongs to a woman named Cassandra.
63	6	"Oh. Ohh. Ohhh."	Mars Horodyski	Sasha Leigh Henry	February 22, 2022
Nathan explains that Cassandra is a colleague in the accounting department and reassures Kate she has nothing to worry about. Unconvinced, Kate visits Nathan's office to confront him, only to discover that Cassandra is actually Marlene's sister. Nathan privately explains to Kate that Cassandra wants custody of Nathan Jr.; Kate refuses, but Nathan is open to the idea, as he is having trouble connecting with his teenage son. Anne, who has begun attending her mandated anger management classes, fires Alice upon discovering that Alice is giving therapeutic advice to her regular clients. As HR continues to investigate their relationship, Malcolm tries to convince Jenny to get married sooner than later; Jenny agrees to hire a wedding planner. Sloane discovers that her ultrasound technician Paul is the man she kissed at the park, and she initiates a sexual encounter with him.
64	7	"Goin' Fishin'"	Mars Horodyski	Jessie Gabe & Masooma Hussain	March 1, 2022
Kate tries to help Nathan connect with Nathan Jr., who ultimately decides to come out to his father. Anne returns to Cochrane to support Lionel in his court case but gets kicked out of the courtroom; Lionel is ultimately given a fine and ordered to stay 500 kilometers away from Cochrane. After Goldie pays off Rebecca's testimonials, Kate tries to offer Rosie as an insider, but Rebecca insists that they need multiple testimonials. Sloane continues to bond with Paul. Alice receives an unsolicited visit from Anne's client Heather, who wishes to speak with Alice; Alice sends her away. Jenny asks Kate, Anne, Val and Sloane to be her bridesmaids, to which they hesitantly accept. At her ultrasound appointment, Jenny discovers that her pregnancy is high-risk and that she may experience a miscarriage; Jenny struggles to process the news, and is unable to bring herself to tell Malcolm.
65	8	"Poke the Bear"	Mars Horodyski	Linsey Stewart	March 8, 2022
Kate and Sloane organize multiple women to speak out against Goldie's Goodness, but receive a cease and desist order from Goldie and her daughter Ginnie, who threaten to sue Wynston Publishing and the women if they publish Rebecca's exposé. Kate and Sloane agree to drop the book, but Kate reconsiders after speaking with one of the MLM victims. Sloane begins to grow threatened by Nina, her female junior staffer. Cassandra picks up Nathan Jr. from school and invites herself over at the Foster home for dinner. Cassandra and Kate end up getting into an argument at the dinner table, during which Nathan Jr. learns that Cassandra wants to get custody of him; he storms out. Lionel is angry with Anne for getting kicked out of the courtroom in Cochrane. Anne is stunned by Lionel's anger and believes he is hiding something; Lionel later receives a visit from Tomé, who is intending to make amends.
66	9	"Buried"	Mars Horodyski	Enuka Okuma	March 15, 2022
Fearing that she may be replaced by her junior staffer, Sloane meets with Nina for lunch; the two end up connecting, and Sloane reveals her pregnancy. Later, Nina reveals Sloane's pregnancy without her permission to their other colleagues. Val finds out that her sons have impregnated their girlfriend Crystal. Kate continues to clash with Cassandra while dealing with Charlie's imaginary friend. Goldie gathers a group of protestors to protest Kate's firm. Jenny experiences a miscarriage at work after she suddenly begins spotting and cramping; she does not reveal the news to Malcolm, and privately breaks down when her colleagues throw her a surprise impromptu baby shower. Anne is angered to discover that Lionel and Tomé briefly kissed in Cochrane, and she shatters a glass. Lionel confesses to Anne that he is afraid of her, and accuses her of being "addicted" to rage.
67	10	"Bachelorette, But Make it Spooky"	Peter Huang	Karen Moore	March 22, 2022
Val books a haunted house for Jenny's bachelorette party, which the women are unenthusiastic about attending; Jenny later overhears Kate, Anne and Gena bad mouthing her. Sloane breaks up with Paul when he fails to understand her struggles at work. While playing a bachelorette game, Jenny is upset when none of the women are able to share a favorite memory about her, and she tearfully reveals her miscarriage. Val allows a stranger seeking help into the house, mistakenly believing he is part of the haunted house program. When the group receives an emergency alert about a suspect in the area, Anne pushes the man down the stairs, and Jenny strikes him in the head with a flashlight. Upon receiving a visit from the man's son, the group realizes he is not the suspect and lets him free. The women comfort Jenny over her miscarriage, and a remorseful Jenny acknowledges her own self-centered behavior.
68	11	"The Break"	Yael Staav	Jessie Gabe	March 29, 2022
Rebecca prepares for an interview with respected journalist Marion Davenport; to ensure there are no controversies, Kate asks her colleagues to dig up Rebecca's personal life, during which they discover that Rebecca pursued an affair with a married man. Kate and Mo disagree on how Rebecca should proceed in her interview when Goldie releases an interview condemning Rebecca's relationship. While dealing with the fallout, Kate fails to attend Nathan Jr.'s public speaking assembly, in which the students are asked to talk about somebody they admire. Upon realizing Kate is not present, Nathan Jr. changes his speech to talk about Cassandra. The next day, Kate decides to stay home to spend time with her children, only to discover that Mo is conducting Rebecca's interview. Distracted by the interview, Kate accidentally causes a fire and burns her arm. At the hospital, Kate is advised by her doctor to reduce her workload.
69	12	"The Scary Things"	Yael Staav	Daniel Gold	April 5, 2022
Nathan calls Anne for help when Kate goes missing; Anne locates Kate at the local aquarium, during which Kate admits that she has an addiction to work. Paul convinces Sloane to return to her appointments and confesses his feelings for her, but she rejects him. Sloane exacts revenge against Nina by transferring her to their Cleveland office, and she visits Ceecee to reconcile. Heather confronts Alice in public for ignoring her calls and forces her into her car; Anne violently attacks Heather and threatens to kill her if she contacts Alice again. Seeking to become a better person, Jenny confesses her miscarriage to Malcolm and quits her job. Kate returns home and discovers that Nathan Jr., thinking that Kate abandoned him, has spent the night with Cassandra. Realizing the codependent nature of her friendship with Kate, Anne informs Kate that she has decided to let go of their friendship in order to "figure out" herself as a person.
70	13	"Grow If You Want"	Yael Staav	Catherine Reitman	April 12, 2022
Anne decides to return to anger management classes but struggles to reconcile with Lionel. In her class, Anne has a breakthrough and admits that her anger issues have affected her relationship with her friends and family; Lionel arrives and is touched by her speech. Goldie confronts Kate at Rebecca's book launch, and is undeterred when Ginnie arrives to give a speech speaking out against her mother's business. Kate leaves the book launch early to watch Nathan Jr. leave with his date for the semi-formal dance. Kate confesses to Nathan that she needs to change her work routine in order to prioritize her children. Nathan Jr. ultimately decides to keep living with Kate and Nathan. Sloane reconciles with Paul and gives birth to a baby boy, while Kate offers to become business partners with Richard, Mo and Rosie. Kate calls Anne, and they both agree to rekindle their friendship; Anne is suddenly hit by Heather's car, abruptly ending the call.

=== Season 7 (2023) ===
No. overall	No. in season	Title	Directed by	Written by	Original release date
71	1	"Ohmygodohmygodohmygod"	Yael Staav	Jessie Gabe	January 3, 2023
Lionel and Kate visit a groggy Anne in the hospital, and are informed she has a concussion, broken ribs, and mild brain swelling. One week later, Anne is released from the hospital; Anne tells Kate that her near-death experience was "exhilarating", and decides to face her fears by impulsively buying a pet spider, Tula, much to Lionel's dismay. Sloane returns to work, although her colleagues are disconcerted when she brings her baby son Owen into the office. An unemployed Jenny asks Kate for a job at her firm, to which Kate reluctantly agrees. Richard arranges a meeting with Fronterra Pharmaceuticals, during which company CEO Ram pitches Seedless, the first male birth control pill. Kate later tells Nathan about Seedless, but he questions the safety of the pill and believes there will not be a market for it. Kate calls Rosie to schedule a follow-up meeting with Ram.
72	2	"A Hoot and a Scream"	Yael Staav	Daniel Gold	January 10, 2023
Anne continues to reflect on her near-death experience and expresses her thoughts in anger management; she bonds with Seamus, another member in the group who also had a near-death experience. Lionel hires a pet sitter to take care of Tula. Kate Foster Public Relations arranges a pitch presentation for Ram; Jenny interrupts the meeting and mocks the idea of a male birth control pill, leading Kate to fire Jenny. Kate discovers that a woman, Denise Richards, developed Seedless and decides to use that as an angle for their campaign. Sloane discovers that her colleagues are underestimating her because of her baby, and arranges a meeting to insist they treat her as an equal. Sloane later meets with a client, Maggie, who is unimpressed with Sloane's multitasking and leaves the meeting, warning Sloane that balancing work and a newborn baby is unsustainable.
73	3	"I Got This"	Jessie Gabe	Aidan O'Loughlin	January 17, 2023
Kate arranges an advertisement shoot for Seedless with Denise as the product's spokesperson, only to discover that Denise is a bad speaker on camera. Denise breaks down and proclaims she is not an actress, but a scientist; Kate asks the cameraman to resume recording when Denise begins to talk about the benefits of Seedless. Sloane arranges a second meeting with Maggie, who questions Sloane's decision to not take maternity leave and advises her to focus on one task at a time. Val offers to take care of her granddaughter Jackie after Crystal runs away; she is unable to feed her the bottle and breastfeeds her instead. Anne receives a visit from Seamus at her office and the two spend the day together, during which Seamus reveals that he recently entered a relationship. Kate tries to have sex with Nathan, who has begun taking Seedless; she is stunned when he suddenly becomes emotional, which is one of the side effects of the pill.
74	4	"Funny Business"	Jessie Gabe	Masooma Hussain	January 24, 2023
Jenny visits her wealthy narcissistic mother to ask for money, and is rebuked by her mother for failing to live up to her expectations. After storming out, Jenny discovers that Zoe has stolen her mother's valuable ring, and decides to get it appraised. Kate discovers that Nathan Jr. is pursuing an open relationship with his boyfriend Julian. Anne meets with Kate to discuss her new friendship with Seamus, and ultimately decides to stop meeting with Seamus outside of her office. Kate continues to bond with Ram, who informs her that the Seedless commercial is successful. Forrest and Juniper arrive at Kate's office to pitch "Just Head", a zombie face with a moving tongue reconstructed as a vibrator; Kate immediately shuts down the idea, but Rosie believes it could appeal to the sex toy market. That night, Kate decides to test the "Just Head" but is caught by a horrified Nathan and Nathan Jr.
75	5	"The Sterilizer"	Yael Staav	Linsey Stewart	January 31, 2023
A new article circulates online revealing that Seedless caused a group of men to become sterile during a clinical trial eighteen years ago, forcing Kate to salvage the situation. After discovering that Nathan is anticipating the next episode of popular dating show The Best Lay, Kate contacts The Best Lay producers and asks them to advertise Seedless in order to increase their female viewership. After Sloane reveals that she feels overwhelmed by motherhood, Val signs Sloane up for Bundle, a friendship app intended to connect with other mothers. Sloane matches with another user, Alyssa, and arranges a mom date at the park; she is instead approached by Alyssa's husband Oscar, and the two bond. Anne and Lionel are unconvinced when Alice announces that she is in the drama club. Anne visits Alice at school and is shocked to discover that Alice is dating Seamus.
76	6	"It's Five o'Clock Somewhere"	Yael Staav	Enuka Okuma	February 7, 2023
After getting her mother's ring appraised, Jenny is suddenly threatened and robbed by a stranger. Jenny later decides to attend a self-defense course and discovers that the instructor is her former colleague Gary; she is impressed by Gary's physique and kisses him. While scrolling through stock pictures for Maggie's book, Sloane recognizes one of the models as the woman in Alyssa's Bundle profile. She then rebukes Oscar, who reveals himself to be a writer. Kate meets with Ram outside of the office to brainstorm a new drug, and the two share an intimate conversation in the planetarium. Val begins to sell her breast milk to other mothers. Seamus attends another session with Anne and reveals that he and his girlfriend are planning to have sex that evening. Horrified, Anne leaves work early and returns home just after Alice and Seamus have had sex. Alice realizes that Seamus is Anne's client.
77	7	"It's All Gone"	Romeo Candido	Karen Kicak	February 14, 2023
Kate, Anne, Jenny, Val, Sloane and Alice wake up in Kate's trashed office and try to retrace what happened the previous night. Kate manages to recount that the women were celebrating, and a flashback to the previous night reveals that Anne tried to reconcile with Alice by throwing a coming of age party; Alice is humiliated, but the women convince her to stay. Jenny recounts that Ram was present for the party, and Kate worries that she may have had sex with him. Alice discovers her phone in Jenny's purse, and it is revealed that Jenny and Sloane sent Seamus a text from Alice's phone to reconnect. Alice confronts Anne for her emotional relationship with Seamus, and Anne is crushed to learn that Alice had already lost her virginity before dating him. Kate ultimately recounts that Ram arrived to give her Fronterra's new migraine pill Horamo, which all of the women proceeded to ingest.
78	8	"Fast and Soft"	Jessie Gabe	Linsey Stewart	February 21, 2023
Kate warns Ram that she and her friends blacked out after taking Horamo; Ram claims that he will return the pill to R&D. After discovering that she had ingested Horamo, Val worries that she may face legal repercussions for selling tainted breast milk. Denise warns Kate that Ram is lying and intends to release Horamo to the public whether or not it is safe. Richard pushes Kate to confront Ram directly. Sloane urges Paul to be spontaneous in their relationship; they later have sex in her office, but both do not enjoy it. Jenny continues to have sex with Gary, but he criticizes her selfish behavior when she refuses to pay for his classes, stating that their sexual relationship is compensation. Worried about Alice's sex life, Anne asks her mother Jane to lecture Alice. When Jane refuses, Anne confronts her for their estranged relationship. Alice ultimately decides to stay with her grandmother, upsetting Anne.
79	9	"Old Sloane"	Jessie Gabe	Enuka Okuma	February 28, 2023
Jenny and Kate are asked by Charlie's principal to organize the school fun fair; Jenny agrees to organize the entire fair in order to prove she is a good person. Sloane, overwhelmed with her home and work life, visits Anne for advice. Anne asserts that being a mother changes who you are as a person, and advises Sloane to rediscover her old self, after which Sloane takes Anne to spend time at a bar. Anne later returns home to discover that Alice has moved back in. Denise tells Kate that she has been fired, and that Ram is moving up the release date on Horamo. Kate confronts Ram, who insists that Horamo is safe for release, and reveals that Denise was fired for selling the Seedless formula to a foreign competitor. To ensure that Ram is not lying, Kate gives herself a migraine by consuming large amounts of sodium; she is delighted to discover that her migraine is gone after ingesting the Horamo pill.
80	10	"The Proposal"	Dani Kind	Jessie Gabe	March 7, 2023
Val believes Mel is having an affair because of his secretive behavior, but it is revealed that Mel is actually planning to propose. Kate takes Val to a bar before Mel plans to propose, but Val unexpectedly runs into her ex-husband; she steps outside to confront him, after which Kate is unable to locate Val. Sloane spends time with Paul and his female colleagues, but she argues with Paul after discovering that he had an ex-fiancé, lamenting that she does not know who he is as a person. Anne takes Alice to meet with a college representative, but Alice reveals that she is planning to take a gap year to Australia with Seamus. Kate catches Val and her ex-husband making out, and tells her that Mel is proposing. Val runs to the gazebo where Mel is planning to propose, but he dejectedly leaves after discovering that she kissed her ex-husband. Kate and Ram reunite at the gazebo; he kisses her, but she pulls away.
81	11	"Two Steve Jobs"	Yael Staav	Karen Kicak	March 14, 2023
Kate confesses to Nathan that Ram kissed her as she prepares to attend a pharma conference with Ram. Anne attends the conference and interrupts Ram's Horamo presentation to criticize the safety of the pill. Kate later confronts Anne for being unsupportive of her work. Paul moves in with Sloane, but accidentally breaks a bottle of her mother's perfume; Sloane tearfully reveals that she lost her mother to cancer as a child. Alice approaches Anne and Lionel with a permission form to travel to Australia. Anne initially refuses, but ultimately decides to sign the form, acknowledging that Alice is growing up. Jenny requests Gena's help in organizing the school fun fair; Gena agrees, in exchange for Jenny's help in getting her son an interview with the school. Following the pharma conference, Kate realizes that Ram has feelings for her and decides to drop Fronterra as a client.
82	12	"Fun Fair"	Romeo Candido	Daniel Gold	March 21, 2023
Kate and Nathan bring their kids to the school fun fair that Jenny and Gena have organized, but Kate is dismayed to learn that Anne is avoiding her. Kate Foster Public Relations receives a lucrative offer from Salubra Pharmacy to dissolve their firm; Richard, Rosie and Mo arrive at the fair to confront Kate when she does not give them a response. Sloane is reluctant to take a family photo with Paul and Owen, and reveals that she has unresolved trauma from her mother's death; he comforts her and promises to be patient in their relationship. Kate tries to comfort Nathan Jr. over his break-up with Julian. During the fair's three-legged race, Gena lambasts Jenny for neglecting to introduce her to the headmaster and calls her out for her selfish behavior. Anne calls Kate to apologize, and promises to support her in her career. Kate, contemplating Salubra's offer, reveals to Anne that she finally believes she has achieved her career goals.
83	13	"The End"	Yael Staav	Catherine Reitman	March 28, 2023
Kate and her team have accepted Salubra's offer, but Kate is unimpressed with the conventional nature of Salubra's headquarters. Seeking inspiration, Kate visits her father's grave and experiences a vision of her father, who advises her to "go with the magic." Finding the "magic" in running her own company, Kate decides to quit Salubra and reopens her own firm with Richard, Rosie and Mo. After breaking up with Seamus, Alice decides not to go to Australia; Anne convinces Alice to reconsider, wanting her daughter to embrace the world, unlike herself. Jenny decides to return her mother's ring and resolves to change her behavior for Zoe. Sloane decides to go on maternity leave in order to prioritize herself and her children. The episode closes with a montage of the characters' lives: Val reconciles with Mel and proposes to him; Jenny introduces Gena to the school's headmaster; Alice calls Anne and Lionel from Australia; Val, at her wedding, asks the mothers to discuss their positive attributes that they hope to pass on to their children; Kate leaves for work and gently declines Charlie and Ella's request to make breakfast.
