= Workin' Moms =

Canadian comedy television series

- Genre: Comedy drama; Sitcom
- Created by: Catherine Reitman
- Starring: Catherine Reitman; Jessalyn Wanlim; Dani Kind; Juno Rinaldi; Enuka Okuma; Sarah McVie
- Country of origin: Canada
- Original language: English
- No. of seasons: 7
- No. of episodes: 83 (list of episodes)

Production
- Production companies: Wolf & Rabbit Entertainment

Original release
- Network: CBC Television
- Release: January 10, 2017 – March 28, 2023

Workin' Moms is a Canadian television comedy-drama sitcom series that premiered on CBC Television on January 10, 2017. The show stars Catherine Reitman, Jessalyn Wanlim, Dani Kind, Enuka Okuma, and Juno Rinaldi as a group of friends dealing with the challenges of being working mothers. The series is produced by Wolf + Rabbit Entertainment, the production company of Reitman and her husband, Philip Sternberg.

In February 2019, in the middle of season 3, the series premiered globally on Netflix. On May 29, 2019, Workin' Moms was renewed for a fourth season, which premiered on February 18, 2020. In April 2020, the series was renewed for a fifth season, which premiered on February 16, 2021. In June 2021, the series was renewed for a sixth season. which premiered on January 4, 2022. On June 20, 2022, creator Catherine Reitman announced that pre-production had begun on a seventh and final season, which premiered on January 3, 2023.

== Premise ==
Set in modern-day Toronto, this dramedy series chronicles the lives of five moms who form unusual friendships through a very insightful, yet provocative "Mommy and Me" class, and on their difficult path of urban motherhood, which is packed with the turmoil of kids, highs and lows, careers, marriage and identity issues, all while attempting to reach the holy grail: a sense of self.

== Cast ==
=== Main ===
- Catherine Reitman as Kate Foster (née Hoffman), a PR executive and company director, and a mother of two
- Dani Kind as Anne Carlson, Kate's best friend and a mother of two; also, a therapist and aspiring author
- Juno Rinaldi as Frances "Frankie" Coyne, a realtor (seasons 1–5)
- Jessalyn Wanlim as Jennifer "Jenny" Matthews, an IT specialist (seasons 1 & 3–7; recurring season 2)
- Philip Sternberg as Nathan Foster, Kate's husband
- Ryan Belleville as Lionel Carlson, Anne's husband
- Sadie Munroe as Alice Carlson, the elder of Lionel and Anne's two daughters
- Dennis Andres as Ian Matthews, Jenny's screenwriting stay-at-home husband (seasons 1–3; recurring season 4)
- Sarah McVie as Valerie "Val" Szalinsky, the peppy administrator of Toddler Time, the "Mommy and Me" group that the main characters participate in (seasons 5–7; recurring seasons 1–4)
- Enuka Okuma as Sloane Mitchell, a publishing executive (seasons 6–7; recurring season 5)

=== Recurring ===
- Oluniké Adeliyi as Giselle Bois, Frankie's initial wife (seasons 1–3 & 5, guest season 4)
- Katherine Barrell as Alicia Rutherford (seasons 1 & 2; guest seasons 4 & 5)
- Nikki Duval as Rosie Phillips, Kate's assistant, later turned business partner
- Novie Edwards as Sheila (season 1)
- Peter Keleghan as Richard Greenwood, Kate's boss
- Mimi Kuzyk as Eleanor Galperin, Kate's mother (seasons 1–4, guest season 5)
- Jennifer Pudavick as Gena Morris, Jenny's co-worker
- Jess Salgueiro as Mean Nanny/Renya (seasons 1–3)
- Kevin Vidal as Maurice "Mo" Daniels
- Amanda Brugel as Sonia, Ian's girlfriend (season 2)
- Nelu Handa as Jade (seasons 2 & 3)
- Aviva Mongillo as Juniper, Frankie's very young and naive ex-girlfriend (seasons 2–5, guest season 6)
- Tennille Read as Bianca Thomas, Frankie's new wife (seasons 2–4, guest season 5)
- Donald MacLean Jr. as Forrest Greenwood, Richard's son (season 3, guest seasons 4–7)
- Victor Webster as Michael "Mike" Bolinksi, Kate's business partner (seasons 3 & 4)
- Alex Mallari Jr. as Malcolm Cody Patrick, Jenny's new love interest (seasons 4–6)
- Aiza Ntibarikure as Maya Bronte (seasons 4–6)
- Kyle Breitkopf as Nathan Jr., Nathan's biological son from an ex-girlfriend (seasons 6–7)
- Jayne Eastwood as Goldie, company CEO of Goldie's Goldness (season 6)
- Raymond Ablack as Ram, company CEO of Fronterra (season 7)
- Teresa Pavlinek as Denise, Seedless scientist (season 7)

=== Guest ===
- Alden Adair as Marvin Grimes, Jenny's boss (seasons 1, 2 & 4)
- Mary Ashton as Sarah Hoffman, Kate's sister (seasons 1 & 2)
- Dan Aykroyd as Wayne Hoffman, Kate's father (season 1 & 7)
- Zachary Bennett as Carl (seasons 1 & 2)
- Wendy Crewson as Victoria Stromanger, Kate's client in Montreal (seasons 1 & 3)
- Varun Saranga as Chad (seasons 1 & 2)
- Jann Arden as Jane Carlson (seasons 2 & 7)
- Angela Asher as Dorothy Cutwater (season 2)
- Nadine Djoury as Iris (season 3)
- LaRonn Marzett as Tom (season 3)
- Erika Swayze as Brenna (season 3)
- Lisa Berry as Natashia (seasons 4 & 5)
- Ann Pirvu as Trish, Mike's partner (season 4)

== Episodes ==
Season	Episodes	Originally released	
Season	Episodes	First released	Last released
1	13	January 10, 2017	April 4, 2017
2	13	December 19, 2017	April 10, 2018
3	13	January 10, 2019	March 21, 2019
4	8	February 18, 2020	April 7, 2020
5	10	February 16, 2021	April 13, 2021
6	13	January 4, 2022	April 12, 2022
7	13	January 3, 2023	March 28, 2023

== Availability ==
In Canada, the series aired on the CBC, and new episodes are released on CBC Gem the day after an episode was first broadcast during its run. All seasons are available to stream on Netflix worldwide, including the United States.

== Awards and recognition ==
In 2018 and 2019 the show was nominated for the International Emmy Award for Best Comedy Series.

In 2019, the show received 9 Canadian Screen Award nominations at the 7th Canadian Screen Awards, including Best Comedy Series and Best Actress for both show creator Catherine Reitman and Dani Kind. Reitman also received a nomination for Best Direction (for the episode “2005”), while Jann Arden, Amanda Brugel, and Peter Keleghan received recognition for Best Supporting or Guest Actor/Actress.

For the 9th Canadian Screen Awards in 2021, the show received a nomination for Best Comedy Series. Sarah McVie and Juno Rinaldi were both nominated for Best Supporting Actress, Comedy. Ryan Belleville and Peter Keleghan received Best Supporting Actor, Comedy nominations - while Colin Mochrie received a nomination for Best Guest Performance, Comedy. Catherine Reitman received a Best Direction, Comedy nomination, Kristin Fieldhouse a Best Photography, Comedy nomination and Marianna Khoury a Best Picture Editing, Comedy nomination. Both Dani Kind and Reitman were once again nominated for Best Lead Actress, Comedy.

== Reception ==
On Rotten Tomatoes, season 1 has an approval rating of 77% based on reviews from 13 critics.

John Doyle of The Globe and Mail, wrote that the show "reeks of entitlement and privilege." Doyle further expressed sympathy for working mothers but not the show saying "The moms represent only a very specific, urban-bourgeois type. Their troubles are tiny, they live in luxury and their only contact with anything approaching the reality of contemporary life is via their nannies."

Brad Oswald of the Winnipeg Free Press wrote that the show "demonstrates a deft ability to deliver punchlines while at the same time confronting the realities of 21st-century motherhood."

Regarding the show's fifth season, Cristina Iskander of Tell-Tale TV noted that "as a whole, Workin’ Moms Season 5 is a solid addition to the series... it maintains the general irreverence it’s become known for over the years while allowing for a more serious and somber tone than it’s traditionally had before."
