= It Feeds =

2025 film directed by Chad Archibald

- Film poster
- Directed by: Chad Archibald
- Written by: Chad Archibald
- Starring: Ashley Greene; Shawn Ashmore; Ellie O'Brien; Juno Rinaldi
- Production companies: Black Fawn Films; Productivity Media
- Distributed by: Falling Forward Films; Samuel Goldwyn Films
- Release date: March 28, 2025
- Running time: 102 minutes
- Country: Canada
- Language: English
- Box office: $1,097,103

It Feeds is a 2025 Canadian supernatural horror film written and directed by Chad Archibald, starring Ashley Greene, Shawn Ashmore, Ellie O'Brien, and Juno Rinaldi.

== Premise ==
Cynthia is a psychiatrist who has the power to see into her patients' minds. After a girl named Riley comes to Cynthia and her daughter Jordan and claims that a supernatural entity is feeding off of her, Jordan is determined to help Riley at all costs.

== Cast ==
- Ashley Greene as Cynthia
- Ellie O'Brien as Jordan
  - Eadie Murphy as Young Jordan
- Juno Rinaldi as Agatha
- Shawn Ashmore as Randall
- Brooklyn Marshall as the Creature
- Mark Taylor as Detective Otis
- Shayelin Martin as Riley
- Julian Richings as Dr. Ronald Whittaker

== Release ==
It Feeds was released in the United States on March 28, 2025 as part of Panic Fest.

== Reception ==
On the review aggregator website Rotten Tomatoes, 88% of 26 critics' reviews are positive. Metacritic, which uses a weighted average, assigned the film a score of 66 out of 100, based on 5 critics, indicating "generally favorable" reviews.

Catherine Bray of The Guardian gave the film 3 stars out of 5, saying that "it may not stick around in your memory [...] but it passes the time chillingly enough.". Simon Abrams, writing for RogerEbert.com, gave the film 2.5 stars out of 4, saying that it "ultimately looks like a handsome genre exercise that was confidently realized with clarity and exactitude", but commenting that he wished the filmmakers were "more ambitious."
