= In My Dreams (film) =

- Promotional poster with the tagline: "Close your eyes and fall in love."
- Genre: Television romance
- Screenplay by: Teena Booth; Suzette Couture
- Story by: Teena Booth
- Directed by: Kenny Leon
- Starring: Katharine McPhee; Mike Vogel; JoBeth Williams; Joe Massingill; Rachel Skarsten; Antonio Cupo; Jessalyn Wanlim
- Theme music composer: William Ross
- Countries of origin: Canada; United States
- Original language: English

Production
- Producers: Brent Shields; David A. Rosemont
- Cinematography: James Chressanthis
- Editor: Priscilla Nedd Friendly
- Production companies: Sony Pictures Television; Hallmark Hall of Fame

Original release
- Network: ABC
- Release: April 20, 2014

In My Dreams is a Hallmark Hall of Fame television film. It premiered on ABC on April 20, 2014, and stars Katharine McPhee, Mike Vogel and JoBeth Williams. It is directed by Kenny Leon from a story by Teena Booth and screenplay by Booth and Suzette Couture.

In My Dreams is the last Hallmark Hall of Fame presentation to be aired on a broadcast television network after 63 years. The anthology series has since moved to Hallmark Channel.

== Plot ==
Nick Smith and Natalie Russo are single, living in the same city. On opposite sides of a fountain, they are both encouraged to make a wish with a penny. Their coins touch underwater, and they both feel odd.

Natalie's best friend Sharla pushes her to make the restaurant she inherited from her mother her own. She brings Mario, a chef from Italy, to revamp the recipes. He is hot-headed and initially uncompromising so Natalie fears he'll intimidate her regulars.

Nick's mom Charlotte has been pushing him to get over Jessa, his cheating ex. Concerned he never has second dates, she regularly sets him up. The latest is Lori Beth, someone he dated when 12. Charlotte gets them tickets to a comedy performance. At work, although a trained architect, Nick is only a draftsman. Frustrated he's underappreciated, he quietly submits his own proposal for the Green Bridge Award.

Natalie and Nick fall asleep in their respective homes and dream about meeting at the Hayward Fountain. They introduce themselves and have instant chemistry, but when they touch they both awaken.

The next day at the restaurant, Natalie tells Sharla about the real-feeling dream. Although Sharla's cousin is interested, she doesn't care. Sharla is drawn to Mario, and Natalie isn't. He reminds her their mothers had been friends in Italy, and passes on his mother's condolences.

Nick's date with Lori Beth goes badly. She's over eager, sending hourly reminders, photos of potential outfits and ccing his mother. She continues trying too hard, reminiscing about moments they'd shared 15 years ago. Nick walks her to her car, clearly uninterested in seeing her again.

Again, Natalie and Nick dream together, this time on a rooftop. She wants to take risks and is tired of playing it safe. He tells her about the bridge he's designed for the contest and she shares an amaretto cookie. Balanced on the roof's edge, when they try to kiss they fall, and both wake on the floor.

Natalie tells Sharla about the second dream, that she can't stop thinking about him, and is anxious to go back to sleep to see him again. In their third dream they stroll all night, encouraging each other's careers. They both admit they are starting to have feelings for one another.

Before Nick can fall asleep the next night, Jessa calls him to kill a rodent, and seduces him, so Natalie doesn't find him. Upset, she decides to avoid sleeping the following night, so goes dancing with Mario. He kisses her at the end and says their moms always thought they'd be together. When Nick goes to find her, this time he is alone.

Nick dines at Natalie's restaurant but they don't see each other. Finding two little sketches on the floor, of his bridge and Hayward Fountain, she goes to the fountain. Natalie finds the florist she'd met there five days ago. She tells her, according to fountain mythology, they have exactly seven days to turn their dreams into a reality. When asked if it'd worked for her, the florist suggests she find a real man and forget the legend.

That night, Natalie meets Nick in their dreams and tells him she can't meet him again as he's obviously not real. She tells him that they only have one night left to fulfill the myth, but she fears it will break her heart, so she vows not to sleep the next night.

At Nick's parents' 40th anniversary, his dad mentions the Hayward fountain legend and his mother tells him to take a leap of faith. Nick finally quits at the architecture firm. At the restaurant, seeing a spark between Sharla and Mario, Natalie suddenly realises she must find Nick, although an important critic is there. He simultaneously decides he must find her, so leaves the award ceremony.

Nick arrives to the fountain first, accidentally dropping the invite. Natalie misses him, but finds it and heads to the ceremony. He seeks her by visiting every Italian restaurant in town. Nick finds Russos, but Sharla doesn't know where Natalie is. Joe at the ceremony can't help her either. Both go to the fountain, find each other and kiss.

The next day, Natalie introduces Nick to the florist.

== Cast ==
- Katharine McPhee as Natalie Russo, a woman who focuses all her time and energy into keeping her family's Italian restaurant open
- Mike Vogel as Nick Smith, a bridge designer and architect trying to cope with a disastrous relationship split and work frustrations
- JoBeth Williams as Charlotte Smith, Nick's well-meaning meddling mother determined to find him the perfect mate
- Rachel Skarsten as Jessa, Nick's former girlfriend, who returns to win him back
- Antonio Cupo as Mario, a chef in Natalie's restaurant, who is romantically interested in her
- Jessalyn Wanlim as Sharla, Natalie's best friend
- Joe Massingill as Joe Yablonski, Nick's best friend
- Giacomo Baessato as Damien, Natalie's waiter
- Erica Carroll as Karen Smith, Nick's sister

== Filming ==
The film was shot in and around Burnaby, British Columbia, Canada, from November 19 through December 20, 2013.

== Reception ==
=== Critical reception ===
Brian Lowry of Variety called the idea of the film "dreamy" and added, "Although the story is perhaps more naturally suited to Hallmark's traditional pre-Valentine's Day window, this is one of the more satisfying movies the storied franchise has delivered in some time." Jackie Cooper of The Huffington Post stated, "This movie strikes just the right tone of romantic entertainment. It is semi-lightweight fare for [Hallmark Hall of Fame] but it is a story that entertains."

=== Ratings ===
In its original airing, the film was seen by 4.79 million viewers, with an adult 18-49 rating of 1.0.

== See also ==
- Three Coins in the Fountain
