= Dennis Andres =

German-Canadian actor and stuntman (born 1987)

- Born: June 23, 1987 (age 39); West Berlin, West Germany
- Occupations: Actor, stuntman
- Years active: 2012–present

Dennis Andres (born 23 June 1987) is a German-Canadian actor and stuntman. He is best known for playing the roles of Ian Matthews on the CBC and Netflix series Workin' Moms (2017–2020) and Travis on Strays (2022).

== Early life ==
Andres was raised in Berlin, Germany; his family later immigrated to Canada, settling in Hamilton, Ontario. As a child, he earned a black belt in Wado Kai Karate and Kickboxing and went on to place 6th in all of Canada for The WKF (World Karate Federation) Nationals at the age of 18. He attended Cathedral High School where he was a captain of his football team, but withdrew after suffering a number of injuries. A co-op counsellor recommended he become a stuntman; she introduced him to the school drama teacher who became his mentor, setting him up with an apprenticeship at the Players Guild of Hamilton community theatre.

== Career ==
After working a few theatre productions backstage, Andres took on a role as an actor in a theatre production at the Players Guild, performing the role of Jacob in the play Salt Water Moon. Soon after, he sought out his first agent through a close friend, and began booking roles in TV and film. He was cast in his first leading film role in Lady Psycho Killer in 2015.

In 2016, Andres was cast as Ian Matthews, one of the fathers in Workin' Moms, a half-hour episodic written by the show's creator and lead actress, Catherine Reitman. He later reprised his role in seasons 2, 3, and 4.

In 2018, he booked a supporting role as Justin Hayes opposite Hannah Simone in the pilot episode of The Greatest American Hero. He has since appeared in a variety of television roles on shows including The Strain, Good Witch, Star Trek: Discovery and Diggstown.

In June 2020, Andres starred alongside Sofia Carson and Enrico Colantoni in the Elissa Down-directed Netflix Original Feel the Beat. He played the lead role in TV movies Blueprint to the Heart as Brooks (2020), and Hint of Love, as Will Fryer (2020).

He was in Colors of Love, where he plays the supportive big brother, Craig Harris, to Taylor, played by Jessica Lowndes. Also starring Chad Michael Murray, the film was released in 2021.

In 2023, he played Coach Mike in the film Fitting In, and starred in the television movie The Wedding Rule with Julie Nolke.

== Filmography ==
=== Film ===
Year	Title	Role	Notes
2014	X Wins	Bobby	
2015	Lady Psycho Killer	Daniel	
2016	Bed of the Dead	Ren	
2016	The Apostle Peter: Redemption	Captain of the Guard	
2017	Defective	Pierce Felton	
2019	A Wakefield Project	Reese	
2020	Feel the Beat	Coach Buzz	
2021	Colors of Love	Craig	
2023	Fitting In	Coach Mike	
2023	The Wedding Rule	Max	
2024	Christmas in the Spotlight	Rob 'Golden' Gonville	
2025	Juliet & Romeo	Lord Paris	
2025	Montana Mavericks	Cliff	Limited theatrical release

=== Television ===
Year	Title	Role	Notes
2012	Curious and Unusual Deaths	Grant Rice	Episode: "Death by Mechanical Breakdown"
2012	Cold Blood	Sgt. Maloney	Episode: "The Truth Hurts"
2014	The Strain	German Guard #2	Episode: "Runaways"
2014	Cold Blood	Frat Boy #2	Episode: "Where Murders Go Unsolved"
2016	Hollywood Homicide Uncovered	Det. R. De Anda	Episode: "Dorothy Stratten"
2017	Dark Matter	Turrence	Episode: "Welcome to the Revolution"
2017	Star Trek: Discovery	Engineer Rance	Episode: "The Butcher's Knife Cares Not for the Lamb's Cry"
2017	How to Buy a Baby	Greg	Episode: "Fertilifight"
2017–2020	Workin' Moms	Ian Matthews	Main role
2018	Killjoys	Harvost Mueller	Episode: "The Warrior Princess Bride"
2018	No Escape Room	Andrew	TV movie
2018	Murdoch Mysteries	Phelps	Episode: "Secrets and Lies"
2018	The Greatest American Hero	Justin Hayes	TV movie
2019	Good Witch	Connor Cleig	Episode: "The Honeymoon"
2020	The Detectives	Detective Ken Legge	Episode: "Mother and Son"
2020	Diggstown	Conner	Episode: "Cheryl Battiste"
2020	Blueprint to the Heart	Brooks	TV movie
2020	Hint of Love	Will	TV movie
2022	Transplant	Ian	Episode: "Locked"
2022	Strays	Travis	10 episodes
2023	The Wedding Rule	Max	TV movie
2023	The Changeling	Leif	Episode: "This Woman's Work"
2024	Hudson & Rex	Brandon Keillor	Episode: "Wag the Dog"
