= Sarah McVie =

Canadian actress

Sarah McVie (born March 21, 1978) is a Canadian actress and playwright. She is most noted for her regular role as Valerie Szalinsky in Workin' Moms, for which she received three Canadian Screen Award nominations, for Best Supporting Actress in a Comedy Series at the 9th Canadian Screen Awards in 2021, and Best Supporting Performance in a Comedy Series at both the 11th Canadian Screen Awards in 2023 and the 12th Canadian Screen Awards in 2024.

== Early career ==
Born and raised in Ottawa, Ontario, she attended Canterbury High School, later studying theatre at George Brown College in Toronto. She joined the Stratford Festival company in 2001, becoming noted for her performances as Cordelia in the 2002 production of King Lear, and Drina in its production of Peter Hinton's Swanne. She won Stratford's John Hirsch Award for emerging young actors in 2002. Her later roles at Stratford included the Bawd in Pericles, Prince of Tyre, Maria in Love's Labour's Lost, Lady Macduff in Macbeth, and Vee Talbott in Orpheus Descending.

Her later stage roles with other theatre companies included productions of Ann-Marie MacDonald's Goodnight Desdemona (Good Morning Juliet) in 2008, Willy Russell's Educating Rita in 2010. and Evelyne de la Chenelière's Strawberries in January in 2011. She received a Rideau Award nomination for Outstanding Performance, Female in 2011, for Educating Rita.

== The Public Servant ==
In 2015, McVie, Jennifer Brewin, Haley McGee and Amy Rutherford premiered The Public Servant, a comedic play about a young woman joining the Canadian civil service, at the Great Canadian Theatre Company. McVie appeared in the play as Lois, an officious and by-the-book middle manager.

The play later received a Toronto production at the Berkeley Street Theatre in 2016.

== Film and television ==
Through her career she also appeared in supporting and guest roles in film and television, until being cast as Val in Workin' Moms in 2017, appearing as a series regular until its conclusion in 2023.

During her time on Workin' Moms, she also had smaller supporting roles in Detention Adventure and The Handmaid's Tale.

In 2026 she returned to the stage in Coal Mine Theatre's production of Jonathan Spector's Eureka Day.

== Political activity ==
In 2021 McVie moved to Toronto's flood-prone Rockcliffe–Smythe neighbourhood, becoming known as an activist and organizer with the Black Creek Flood Coalition after her own home was repeatedly flooded.

In May 2026, she announced her candidacy in the 2026 Toronto mayoral election.
