= Kevin Vidal =

Canadian actor

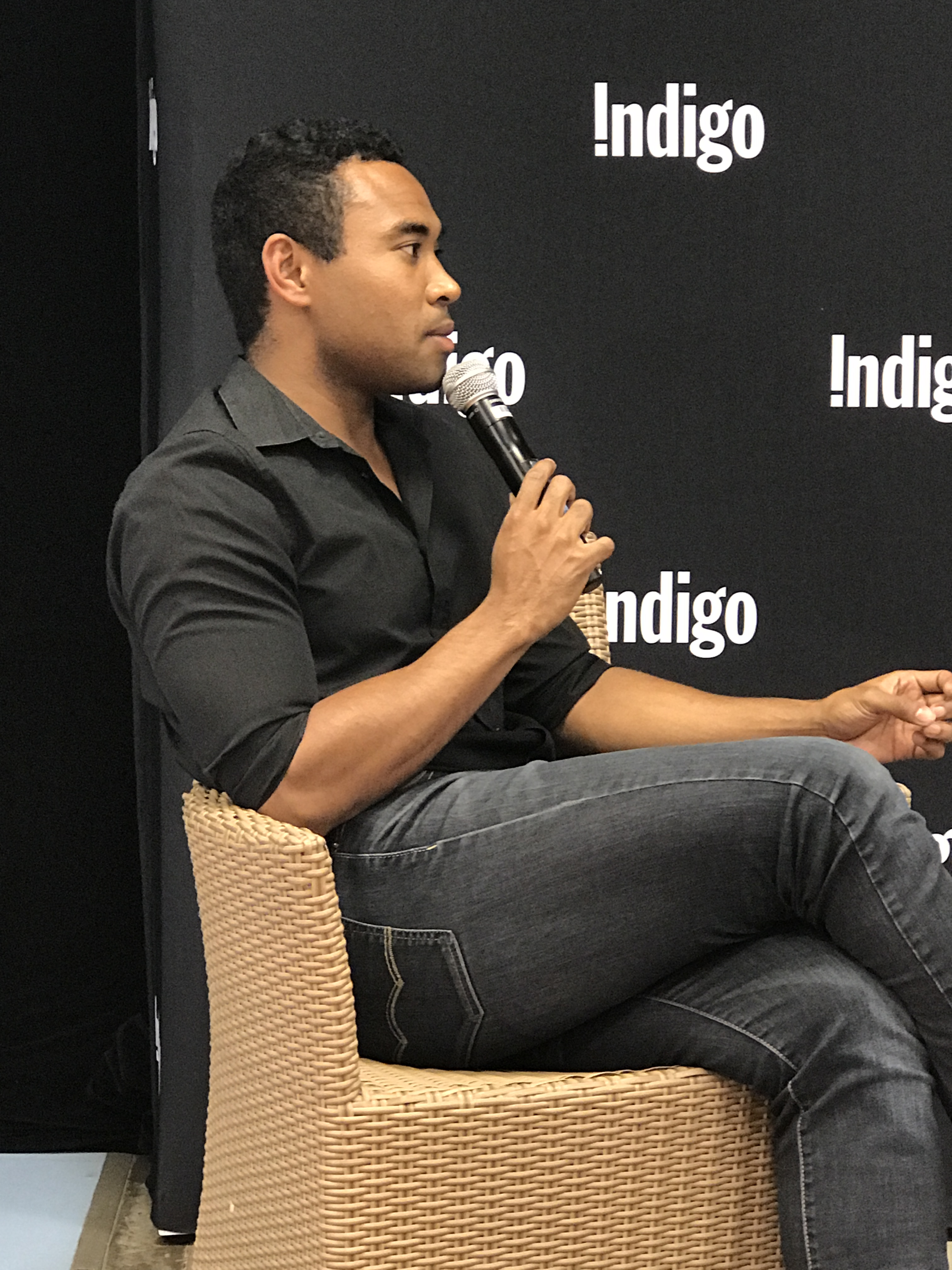
Vidal in Toronto in 2017

Kevin Vidal is a Canadian actor, comedian and improviser known for his television roles in Sunnyside, Workin' Moms, and in the limited series Culprits, as well as for his contributions to Canada's improv scene through Second City in Toronto and Blind Tiger Comedy in Vancouver.

== Early life ==
Kevin Vidal was born and raised in Toronto, Canada, where he developed an interest in comedy and acting from a young age. While specific details regarding his early education and personal background are limited in public records, Vidal's career began taking shape when he joined Toronto's Second City, a premier venue for Canadian improv and comedy training.

== Career ==
A graduate of the actor training program at the Toronto company of The Second City, he subsequently appeared in several shows for the company including We Can Be Heroes, The Second City Guide to the Symphony and the Canadian Comedy Award-winning Sixteen Scandals.

He is known for his starring role in the comedy television series Sunnyside, for which he and the other core cast collectively won the Canadian Screen Award for Best Performance in a Variety or Sketch Comedy Program or Series at the 4th Canadian Screen Awards in 2016.

He later joined the cast of the popular Canadian television show Workin' Moms, which further expanded his audience and solidified his presence in Canadian television.

He has also had roles in the television series Kim's Convenience, and Strays, the web series But I'm Chris Jericho!, Gary and His Demons and Soul Decision, the films The Parting Glass and The Bet, and on stage in a production of Come from Away.

Released in 2023, Vidal was cast in the limited Disney+ series Culprits, as Jules, the supportive fiancé of Joe Petrus (played by Nathan Stewart-Jarrett), a former criminal attempting to lead a quiet suburban life with Jules and their two children. Vidal's character contributes to a nuanced portrayal of a queer, Black relationship on screen, which is integrated into the narrative without focusing solely on their sexuality. The relationship between Jules and Joe is depicted as integral to the series, adding emotional depth as Joe confronts his criminal past to protect his family.

In addition to acting, Vidal has an active improvisation career dating back to his time with Second City. After moving to Vancouver in 2020 he joined the faculty of Blind Tiger Comedy, a comedy school co-founded by members of The Sunday Service and Hip.Bang!.

== Personal life ==
Vidal is of Guyanese and Filipino descent, and is bisexual. He lives in Vancouver with his husband. His personal experiences, including his ADHD diagnosis during the pandemic, have influenced his teaching philosophy at Blind Tiger Comedy.

== Filmography ==
=== Film ===
Year	Title	Role
2016	Odd Squad: The Movie	Weird Colin
2018	The Parting Glass	Phillipe
2020	The Bet	Marvin Smith

=== Television ===
Year	Title	Role	Notes
2015	Sunnyside	Various	13 episodes
2016	Kim's Convenience	Roger	2 episodes
2017–2023	Workin' Moms	Mo Daniels	25 episodes
2020	The Boys	Cyrus	1 episode
2021	American Gods	Greeter	1 episode
2021–2022	Strays	Liam	20 episodes
2023	Culprits	Jules	8 episodes
2025	Watson	Young John Watson	Episode: "Take a Family History"

== Awards and honors ==
Awards and nominations

Year	Award	Category	Work	Result	Ref(s)
2016	Canadian Screen Award	Best Performance in a Variety or Sketch Comedy Program or Series (Individual or Ensemble)	Sunnyside	Won	
2019	Canadian Screen Award	Best Web Series	Soul Decision	Nominated	
2023	Leo	Best Performance in a Music, Comedy or Variety Program or Series	Strays (Episode: Puppy Love)	Nominated	
