= Jessalyn Wanlim =

Canadian-American actress and model (born 1982)

- Born: Jessalyn Wanlim; September 3, 1982 (age 44); Calgary, Alberta, Canada
- Occupations: Actress, model
- Years active: 2003–present
- Known for: Workin' Moms
- Height: 5 ft 4 in (163 cm)

Jessalyn Wanlim (born September 3, 1982) is a Canadian-American actress and model. She played Evie Cho on the science fiction television series Orphan Black, as well as Jenny Matthews on the sitcom Workin' Moms. She had a recurring role in Scoundrels as Patty Hong in five episodes.

== Life and career ==
Wanlim was born and raised in Calgary, Alberta, Canada. She currently resides in Nashville, Tennessee.

She began acting and landed the recurring role of Rachael, the nanny to Kendall and Zach, in the television series All My Children, appearing in nearly fifty episodes of the series from 2006 to 2009. During her time on All My Children, Wanlim also appeared as Pauletta Cho in three episodes of Gossip Girl.

She began starring as Jenny Matthews on the CBC sitcom Workin' Moms as a main role in 2017, but was demoted to a recurring role for the second season. She returned as a starring character starting season three and remained until 2023, the seventh and final season.

== Filmography ==
=== Film ===
Year	Title	Role	Notes
2008	The New Twenty	Amy	
2009	The Good Guy	Jordan	
2011	A Cinderella Story: Once Upon a Song	Angela	Video
2012	Alex Cross	Paramita Megawati	
2014	In My Dreams	Sharla	
2020	Abby & Emily Go to Palm Springs	Liz	Short
2020	Pink Skies Ahead	Joanie	Completed

=== Television ===
Year	Title	Role	Notes
2006–2009	All My Children	Rachael	Recurring role
2007, 2009	Gossip Girl	Pauletta Cho	Episodes: "Victor, Victrola", "You've Got Yale!", "Carrnal Knowledge"
2008	The Border	Chow Li Zhen	Episode: "Physical Assets"
2008	Do Not Disturb	Penny	Episode: "Break Room"
2009	Life on Mars	Sweet Jane	Episode: "Let All the Children Boogie"
2009	Psych	Polexia Li	Episode: "Let's Get Hairy"
2009	CSI: NY	Portia Pryce	Episode: "It Happened to Me"
2009	Bones	Dierdre Ryan	Episode: "The Gamer in the Grease"
2010	Fake It Til You Make It	Reina Chu	Episode: "Talk to My Agent"
2010	Scoundrels	Patty Hong	Regular role
2011	The Chicago Code	Penny Ling	Episode: "Greylord & Gambat"
2011	Melissa & Joey	Lindsay Gates	Episode: "Don't Train on My Parade"
2011	The Closer	Sindy Showers	Episode: "Forgive Us Our Trespasses"
2011	Five	Summer	TV film
2012	Frenemies	Cherie St. Claire	TV film
2013	NCIS: Los Angeles	Daisy	Episode: "Red: Part One"
2013	Modern Family	Fiona	Episode: "The Late Show"
2014	In My Dreams	Sharla	TV film
2014	Instant Mom	Nikki	Episode: "48 Hours"
2014	Matador	Kilka Suratt	Episodes: "Mano a Mano", "Everything Old Is New Again"
2014	Kirby Buckets	Samantha Foxworthy	Episode: "Killer Puppies"
2015–2016	Lab Rats	Giselle Vickers	Episodes: "Bionic Action Heroes: Parts 1 & 2", "The Vanishing: Parts 1 & 2"
2016	Orphan Black	Evie Cho	Recurring role (season 4)
2017	Colony	Angelica	Episode: "Company Man"
2017–2023	Workin' Moms	Jenny Matthews	Main role (seasons 1, 3–7); recurring role (season 2)
2018	9-1-1	Sandra	Episode: "Heartbreaker"
2019	The Affair	Lizzie	Episode: "5.7"
2025	Running Point	Bituin	Recurring role (season 1)
