= Juno Rinaldi =

Canadian actress (born 1977)

- Born: May 14, 1977 (age 49); Salt Spring Island, British Columbia, Canada
- Occupation: Actress
- Years active: 1986–present

Juno Rinaldi (née Ruddell; born May 14, 1977) is a Canadian actress. She is most noted for her regular role as Frankie Coyne in Workin' Moms, for which she received a Canadian Screen Award nomination for Best Supporting Actress in a Comedy Series at the 9th Canadian Screen Awards in 2021.

== Filmography ==
=== Film ===
Year	Title	Role	Notes
1995	The War Between Us	Marg Parnum	
1999	Mr. Rice's Secret	Cindy	
2009	Jennifer's Body	Officer Warzak	
2010	Tooth Fairy	Sally	
2015	Life	Mother	
2019	Her Story (In Three Parts)	Elaine	
2019	Bring Out Your Dead	Kira	
2019	It Chapter Two	Gretta	
2023	Fingernails	Principal	
2024	The Invisibles	Franny	
2024	Please, After You	Aida	
2025	It Feeds	Agatha	

=== Television ===
Year	Title	Role	Notes
1996	Home Song	Teenage Girl	Television film
1999	Brotherhood of Murder	Waitress	Television film
2000	Out of Time	Carabelle	Television film
2000	The Linda McCartney Story	Wanda	Television film
2001	These Arms of Mine	Brooke	3 episodes
2001	Silicon Follies	Barista	Television film
2004	Five Days to Midnight	Toy store clerk	5 episodes
2007	Psych	Pat	Episode: "Meat Is Murder, But Murder Is Also Murder"
2007	Bionic Woman	Spa Therapist	Episode: "Do Not Disturb"
2008	Robson Arms	Norah	Episode: "Mean Girls"
2011	Fairly Legal	Girl in Store	Episode: "Priceless"
2012	Fringe	Mother	Episode: "Back to Where You've Never Been"
2012	The Killing	Emily	Episode: "Reflections"
2012	Supernatural	Future Prophet #3	Episode: "A Little Slice of Kevin"
2013	Arrow	Social Worker	Episode: "Home Invasion"
2015	Degrassi: The Next Generation	Nurse	Episode: "The Kids Aren't Alright: Part 1"
2017	How to Buy a Baby	Tess	2 episodes
2017–2021	Workin' Moms	Frankie Coyne	52 episodes
2018	Girl in the Bunker	Kath	Television film
2018	Holly Hobbie	Morgan	3 episodes
2019	Wayne	Deborah	Episode: "The Goddamned Beacon of Truth"
2020	Letters to Satan Claus	Aunt Becky	Television film
2021	My Special Guest	Juno	Episode: "Pilot"
2021	Y: The Last Man	April	3 episodes
2024	Murdoch Mysteries	Caroline Robinson	Episode: "Gimme Shelter"
