= Dani Kind =

Canadian actress (born 1980)

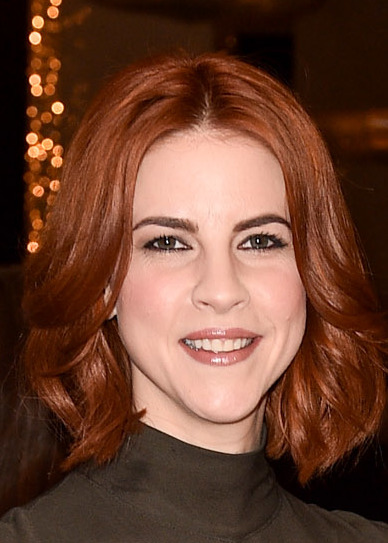
- Kind at Canadian Film Centre Annual Gala & Auction, 15 February 2018
- Born: Danielle Kind; Toronto, Ontario, Canada
- Occupation: Actress
- Years active: 2002–present
- Children: 2

Dani Kind is a Canadian actress, known for television work, including the role of Anne Carlson in Workin' Moms.

== Early life ==
Kind chose her career in grade nine after seeing an actress perform a monologue. She then joined her high school's improv team, and took theatre arts at college.

== Career ==
Kind is most noted for her role as Anne Carlson in the television series Workin' Moms, for which she received a Canadian Screen Award nomination for Best Actress in a Comedy Series at the 7th Canadian Screen Awards in 2019. Kind is repped by Patterson Talent Management.

She also has a recurring role as Mercedes Gardner in Wynonna Earp.

Kind often acts for the Hallmark Channel.

Capsule, a short film she directed, was funded by an Indiegogo campaign and closed at 109%.

== Personal life ==
Kind is the mother of two sons.

== Filmography ==
=== Stage ===
- 2015 Toronto, Ontario production of Jez Butterworth's The River (2012)

=== Film ===
Year	Title	Role	Notes
2002	Posers	Sadie	
2003	Outrage	TV Administrator	Uncredited
2006	Maid of Honor	Mollie Wynn	
2006	Black Widower	Stacy	TV film
2007	Like Mother, Like Daughter	Emily Wilkins	TV film
2007	Decoys 2: Alien Seduction	Goth Girl	Video; uncredited
2007	Christie's Revenge	Christie Colton	TV film
2007	Jack Brooks: Monster Slayer	Waitress	
2008	Dead at 17	Danni Harris	TV film
2008	Picture This	High School Girl	TV film
2009	Carny	Leopard Woman	TV film
2009	Summer's Moon	Amber	
2009	Sleep Buddy	Becky	Short film
2011	The Righteous Tithe	Lara	
2012	Daniel	Call Girl	Short film
2013	Finding Christmas	Courtney	TV film
2014	October Gale	Wait Staff	
2015	Dennis	Jenny	Short film
2015	On the Twelfth Day of Christmas	Grace	TV film
2016	The Night Before Halloween	Detective Reese	TV film
2017	Yellow Lines	Sophie	Short film
2018	The Lie	Trini	
2019	Dotage	Jackie	Short film
2019	Bradley Borgen - The Actor Who Could Not Cry	Angry Mom	TV film
2019	The Banana Splits Movie	Beth	
2019	Bear Trap	Jason Daley	Short film
2020	Two Deaths of Henry Baker	Lucille	
2023	I Used to Be Funny	Jill	
2024	Capsule	—N/a	Short film; director

=== Television ===
Year	Title	Role	Notes
2008	MVP: The Secret Lives of Hockey Wives	TV Reporter	Episode: "The Code"
2010	Pure Pwnage	Julie	Episodes: "Losing to a n00b", "Girls"
2012	The L.A. Complex	Meghan	Episode: "It's All About Who You Know"
2012	Murdoch Mysteries	Peggy	Episode: "War on Terror"
2013	Cracked	Kate Fincher	Episode: "Night Terrors"
2013	Played	Abi	Episode: "Fights"
2014	Saving Hope	Blake	Episode: "Nottingham 7"
2014	The Divide	Pauline McDaniel	Episodes: "And the Little Ones Get Caught", "I'm for Justice"
2015	Remedy	Renee Hudson	Episode: "When You Awake"
2016	Good Witch	Sarah	Episodes: "Driven", "Second Time Around"
2016	Flower Shop Mysteries	Jillian Knight Osbourne	Episode: "Flower Shop Mystery: Dearly Depotted"
2016	Four in the Morning	Dr. Little	Episode: "Blow"
2017–2023	Workin' Moms	Anne Carlson	Main role
2017–2021	Wynonna Earp	Mercedes Gardner	Recurring role (seasons 2–4): 18 episodes
2018	In Contempt	A.D.A. Miltown	Episodes: "Banned", "Necessary Force"
2019	Ransom	Donna Perez	Episode: "Stay of Execution"
