= Working parent =

A working parent is a father or a mother who engages in a work life, in contrast to a housewife or househusband. The variations of family structures include, but are not limited to, heterosexual couples where the father is the breadwinner and the mother keeps her duties focused within the home, homosexual parents who take on a range of work and home styles, single working mothers, and single working fathers. There are also married parents who are dual-earners, in which both parents provide income to support their family. Throughout the 20th century, family work structures experienced significant changes. This was shown by the range of work opportunities each parent was able to take and was expected to do, to fluctuations in wages, benefits, and time available to spend with children. These family structures sometimes raise much concern about gender inequalities. Within the institution of gender, there are defined gender roles that society expects of mothers and fathers that are reflected by events and expectations in the home and at work.

== Historic viewpoints ==
The concept of working parents has existed for centuries, especially during slavery in the United States. Female and male slaves were expected to bear children for white slave masters, yet were not always allowed to parent these children. In some ways, these mothers and fathers were providing income for the offspring they produced, but in the way society thinks of traditional family structures, slaves were only sometimes allowed to be true working parents, earning a modified sort of income to support their family.

For initially non-white immigrants who came to America during the 1700s through the 1900s, the traditional roles of many mothers and fathers were ignored, as both were required to take the role of working parents in order to survive. For Chinese immigrants, fathers and mothers ran laundry-houses, and Irish parents worked in hard-labor factories. This situation changed for mothers to take on the housewife role as immigrants from Europe and Asia earned whiteness.

Television in the 1950s and 1960s gave people a one track structure of how families should function. Men went to work to earn money to pay bills and support his family, and women were expected to stay home as housewives and child care givers. The gender inequalities that are reflective of this idealized family structure result from the beliefs that women are less capable of separating from the children they are predisposed to bear. Additionally, it is still believed by most people that parents who stay at home with no formal outside job are not doing any work, when in fact, these parents put in more hours of work than their counterparts, shown by statistics documenting the second shift.

The ideas about who should and can be a parent have also shifted over time, with a more inclusive range of family structures becoming recognized. During the 20th century, dual-earner families, single-mother and single-father families, adoptive families, grandparents as primary guardians, LGBTQ+ parent families, and more emerged. With the changing sphere of family makeup came a change in who society accepted as parents, an effort mostly directed at limiting black mothers from reproducing if they could not or would not work. These women were known as welfare queens, whom society believed to have children solely for the government to write them checks. Changing ideas about family and changes in the job economy brought new risks for mothers.

Through the latter half of the 20th century, women were discriminated against by employers who believed that women's fertility put them in danger to certain working environments, barring them from performing certain tasks or holding certain positions with pregnancy bans. If parents, particularly mothers, worked, especially in time-demanding jobs, the time they could spend with their child or children was limited, and received criticism. However, if a woman was a stay-at-home mom, they were seen as doing nothing, and therefore devalued. This belief is combated by the increasing amount of documentation that both men and women who stay at home perform more household work than their partners.

== Motherhood penalty and fatherhood bonus ==
Motherhood and fatherhood seem to exist in opposition to each other in regards to work lives. Men have the potential of earning high regards for being a working father. Hegemonic masculinity plays a role in determining a man's bonus. If he is white, middle class and has a stable home life with a wife and children, he is viewed as the most appropriately masculine man available to earn a raise. Traditional work for men surrounds employment in area that highlight a father as being able to provide as the sole earner in a family. The motherhood penalty or "mommy tax", is one that hurts women's financial opportunities, especially in making poverty a majorly feminine status whereas success is masculinised. Assumptions that women will or do have children carries discrimination that says mothers are the ones who will step away from their jobs to boost their children's development. Although women may be easier to employ than men due to the hold on their salary demands, women also face a challenge of defending their rights as mothers in a working environment. Gendered expectations can push women and men into different fields, which worsens the impact of the gender pay gap for pink collar professions. Such barriers can prevent a woman from succeeding professionally, a concept known as the glass ceiling.

== Working mothers ==
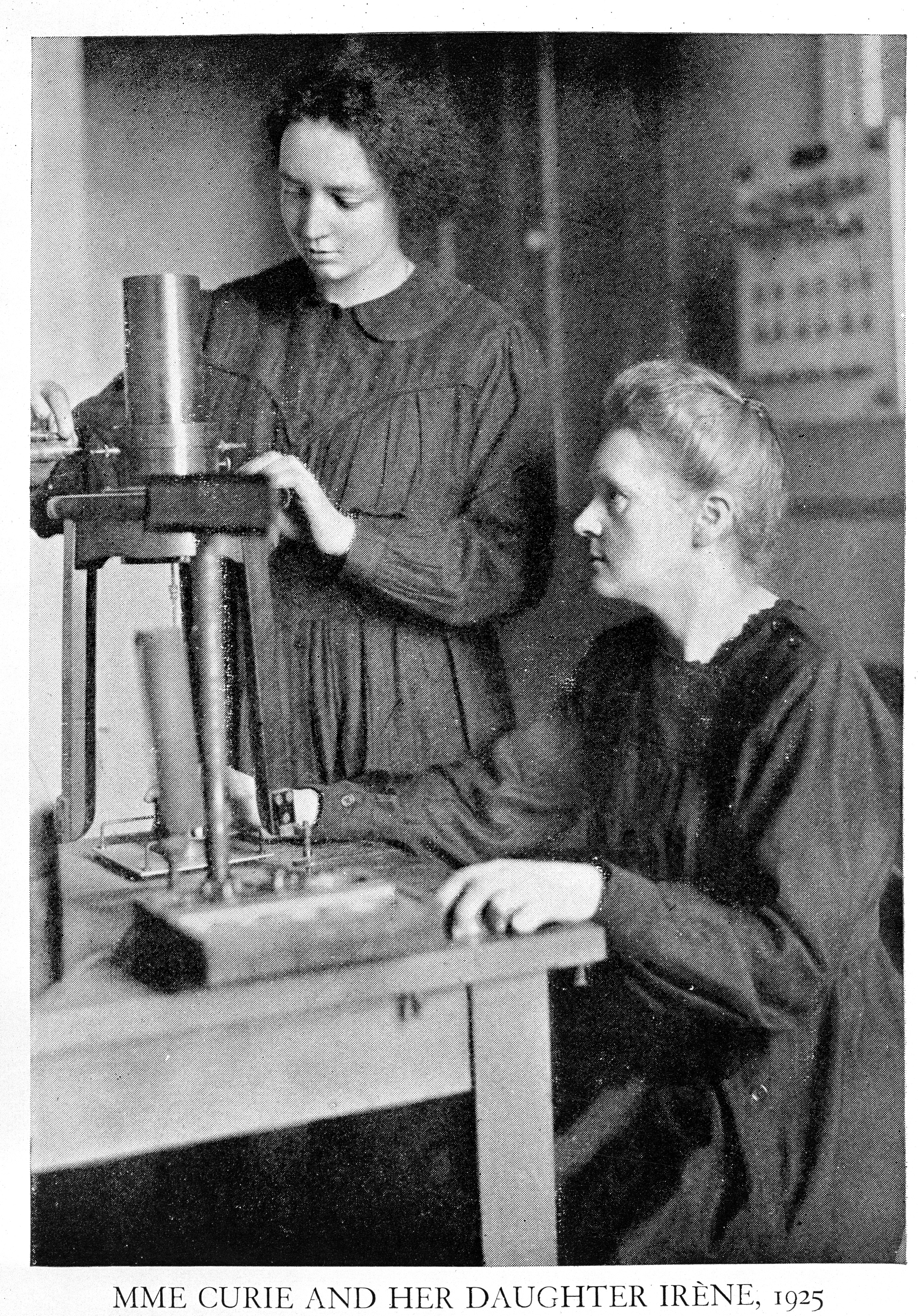
Nobel laureates and working mothers Marie Curie and her daughter Irène Joliot-Curie

The involvement of women in paid work varies and had varied by historical period, geographical region and social class. From the late 19th century to the 1970s, married women in some Western countries were restricted from working outside the home through marriage bars. For instance, in the Netherlands, the marriage bar was removed in 1957, and in Ireland it was removed in 1973. In some European countries, married women could not work without the consent of their husbands until just a few decades ago, for example, in France until 1965 and in Spain until 1975. After second wave of feminism made it possible for more women to be present in the work place, many mothers took advantage; according to the U.S. Department of Labor, the increase of mothers in the workforce, with children under the age of 18, has risen to 70.6% in 2011. Mothers with younger children are less likely to work than those with older children.

Although mothers have flourished in paid labor environments, they still face gender inequalities that affect their ability to maintain a healthy home-work life. The added pressures of working mothers rests on the stereotypical, gendered assumptions that women are the prime care takers of children. This is often reflected in disparities of privileges and advantages in the work place between men and women, where the disadvantages of the motherhood penalty, the wage gap, and the second shift come into play. When women are hired, they are assumed to have more home life responsibilities that can interfere with their ability to do well at work. Relating to their male counterparts, if women want to provide more for their family, they are to take on the masculine work ethic. That is, be more aggressive, and put work before your family. An increase in work demands may alleviate the burden of economic decreases; however, this takes away the time needed to raise a family. With 66% of married women in a dual-income family, that percentage illustrates that, although both parents are economic providers for their family, the women take on both work and family responsibilities due to society's gender roles. Research shows consistence with utility maximization theory, that women are not merely opting out of the workforce, but rather are accurately assessing the potential opportunity and direct labor market costs of their decision to withdraw based on measurable costs and benefits.

=== Working mothers in Europe ===
In Europe, Ireland and the Netherlands have some of the strongest housewife traditions. In the early 1980s, the Commission of the European Communities report Women in the European Community, found that the Netherlands and Ireland had the lowest labour participation of married women, and the most public disapproval of it. In the Netherlands, from the 1990s onwards, the number of women entering the workplace have increased, yet with most of the women only working part time. According to The Economist, in the Netherlands, fewer men had to fight in the World Wars of the 20th century, and so Dutch women did not experience working for pay at rates women in other countries did. The wealth of the country, coupled with the fact that "[Dutch] politics was dominated by Christian values until the 1980s" meant that Dutch women were slower to enter into the workforce. In contrast to the mid-20th century Western Europe, Communist countries such as USSR and Mainland China encouraged married women to keep working after they had given birth. In the US, after the feminist movement (accompanied by the civil rights movement against the racial discrimination and The Vietnam War), there were 50% of married women who kept working after they given birth in 1978 in the US; in 1997, the number was 61%. Increased numbers of housewives happened in the Bush era in the 2000s. After the 2008 financial crisis, because of a decrease in family income, women kept working to help their families, there were 69% Married women who kept working after they had given birth in 2009 in the US.

As more countries joined the European Union, and become subject to its directives, the policies regarding women's labour rights have improved throughout Europe. Noteworthy directives include the Employment Equality Framework Directive, the Pregnant Workers Directive, the Parental Leave Directive and the Directive 2002/73/EC – equal treatment of 23 September 2002 amending Council Directive 76/207/EEC on the implementation of the principle of equal treatment for men and women as regards access to employment, vocational training and promotion, and working conditions.

=== Working mothers in Japan ===
In Japan, according to data collected by the Ministry of Health, Labor, and Welfare, 70.8% of total employed women are mothers whose children under the age of 18. Benefiting from policies that encourage mothers to work, more companies are adopting child care leave and shorter working time to attract more mothers as workers.

However, according to Japan's Gender Equality Bureau, only 3.4% of executives at listed companies in Japan are women, while the percent is 17% in the United States and 30% in France.

== Mommy wars ==
The phrase "mommy wars" has been used since at least 1989 to describe conflicts between mothers who are full-time caregivers and mothers who are working professionals.

Arguments between these two types of mothers center around the most effective use of one's time when raising children. Leslie Morgan Steiner wrote that, as women struggle to come to terms with their own choices in parenting against society's standards, they engage in this warfare that does nothing to promote self-acceptance, acceptance of others, or balance within their individual lives."

== Research studies ==
The Harvard Business Review blog and Pew Research Center have both reported the results of a study, published in May 2013, that suggests that mothers are the "sole or primary source of income" in approximately 40 percent of U.S. households with children. The equivalent statistic in 1960 was 11 percent.

A 2026 Pew Research Center survey of 2,242 working parents in the United States found that 54% of full-time working parents said it was difficult to balance work and family responsibilities. The share was 62% among mothers and 47% among fathers.

== See also ==
- The Second Shift: Working Parents and the Revolution at Home
