= Catherine Reitman =

American-Canadian actress, producer and writer

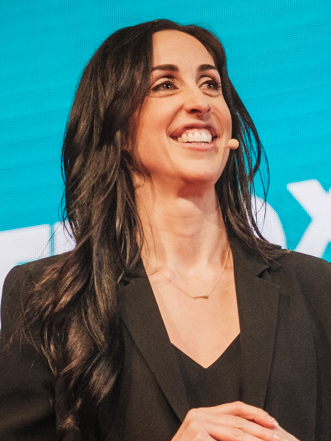
- Reitman in 2017
- Born: Catherine Marcelle Reitman
- Education: Cate School
- Occupations: Actress; producer; writer
- Years active: 1988–present
- Spouse: Philip Sternberg (m. 2009)
- Children: 2
- Father: Ivan Reitman

Catherine Marcelle Reitman ( /ˈraɪtmən/) is a Canadian actress, executive producer, and writer born in the United States. She is the creator, executive producer, writer, and star of the Netflix/CBC Television sitcom Workin' Moms (2017−2023).

== Early life ==
Reitman is the daughter of French-Canadian actress Geneviève Robert and Slovak-born Canadian film director Ivan Reitman. Her father was from a Jewish family and her mother converted to Judaism. She attended Cate School, graduating in 1999.

== Career ==
In January 2011, Reitman launched Breakin' It Down with Catherine Reitman, a film review web show on YouTube, which ended in July 2013. She occasionally filled in for Kevin Smith as a guest co-host with Ralph Garman on their podcast, Hollywood Babble-On.

Reitman starred in the television series The Real Wedding Crashers, based on the hit movie Wedding Crashers. She appeared in the films Beethoven's 2nd (1993), Knocked Up (2007), I Love You, Man (2009) and Friends with Benefits (2011). She has also had roles on the series Hollywood Residential, It's Always Sunny in Philadelphia, How I Met Your Mother, Weeds, and Blackish. In 2022, she appeared in the revival of the sketch comedy series The Kids in the Hall.

In 2016, Reitman formed Wolf & Rabbit Entertainment ULC. with her husband Philip Sternberg to produce the half-hour, single-camera comedy Workin' Moms for CBC and Netflix. She is the creator, executive producer, writer and star of the series, starring alongside Sternberg. In addition, Reitman has directed several episodes in each of the series' seasons. Workin' Moms received five Canadian Screen Award nominations in 2017, including Best Actress, Comedy, for Reitman, and Best Series, Comedy.

== Personal life ==
She is married to actor and producer Philip Sternberg, and they have two children.

== Filmography ==
=== Film ===
Year	Title	Role	Notes
1988	Twins	Granger Granddaughter	
1989	Ghostbusters II	Girl with Puppy	
1990	Kindergarten Cop	3rd Grader	
1993	Dave	Girl at Durenberger	
1993	Beethoven's 2nd	Janie	
1996	Space Jam	Bupkus (voice)	
1997	Father's Day	Victoria	
2003	Crushed	Sarah	Short film
2005	Thank You for Smoking	Reporter #1	
2006	Soup of the Day	Monique	
2006	My Super Ex-Girlfriend	TV News Reporter	
2007	Knocked Up	Alison's Friend	
2009	I Love You, Man	Zooey's Friend	
2009	Jesus People: The Movie	Shauna Mebane	
2009	Post Grad	Jessica Bard	
2010	Crazy/Sexy/Awkward	Liza	Direct-to-video
2010	How to Make Love to a Woman	Vani	
2010	Frank Advice		Short film
2010	The D-Monster	Claire Feinstein	Short film
2011	Friends with Benefits	Female Co-Worker	
2011	Let Go	Unbearable Industry Poser	
2012	The Kitchen	Pam	
2015	Slow Learners	Julia	
2016	Babble-On Begins: The Director's Cut	Reporter (voice)	Short film
